= Makoto Rei =

Japanese theatre actress

- 礼 真琴
- Pronunciation: れい まこと
- Born: 2 December; Edogawa ward, Tokyo Prefecture, Japan
- Education: Takarazuka Music School
- Occupation: Actress
- Years active: 2009–present
- Known for: Takarazuka Star Troupe Top Star (2019–2025)
- Predecessor: Yuzuru Kurenai
- Successor: Chisei Akatsuki
- Awards: 2021 Excellence of the Year (Takarazuka); 2021 Rookie Award (76th Japan Arts Festival Awards)

Makoto Rei (礼 真琴, born 2 December) is a Japanese actress and a former Takarazuka Revue otokoyaku (男役, "male role"). She was a leading actress of the Star Troupe (Top Star).

== Career ==
In 2007, she entered the Takarazuka Music School as part of the 95th class. In 2009 she debuted in the Cosmos Troupe's performance "Amour, it's something like..." and was later assaigned to the Star Troupe. She graduated at the top of her class.

In 2013, Rei was featured in the "rising star guidebook" NEW GENERATION III. Same year, had her first lead role in a newcomer performance (新人公演) (Note: Newcomer performance (新人公演, shinjin kouen) happens once during the main show run and is performed by underclassmen (less than 7 years in the revue). Young prominent actresses usually have a few newcomer lead roles over the years.) Roméo et Juliette as Romeo, after which had another two newcomer leads. In 2014, Rei had her first main stage lead in a Bow Hall performance The Seagull as Konstantin. She is the first in her class to have a lead role both in newcomer and main stage performance. Also in 2014 she had a female lead role in Gone with the Wind as Scarlett O'Hara.

In 2016, had another lead role in Le Muguet. In 2017, with the debut of the new leading actresses (Top combi) Yuzuru Kurenai and Airi Kisaki, became the second-ranking otokoyaku (二番手, nibante) (Note: "Nibante" is not directly announced by the revue. However, it's always clear based on a few factors: when actress (1) wears a smaller version of Top Star feathers for a final parade of the show, (2) continuously gets a central secondary role and is put above the line in the cast list, (3) has her own lead performances and (4) frequently appears on the posters, photos and Sky Stage programs.) of the Star Troupe. She had another two non-top lead roles: in 2017 Aterui and in 2019 The Man from Algiers / Estrellas.

Without transferring, she became a Top Star in October 2019, making her the first Top Star of the 95th class and the Reiwa era. She is the 14th Star Troupe Top Star and 5th otokoyaku to graduate first in class and become a "Top" later (after Natsuko Migiwa, Kei Aran, Hiromu Kiriya and Tomu Ranju). Her Top combi partner became musumeyaku (娘役, "young female role") Hitomi Maisora, who graduated in 2016 as part of the 102nd class also at the top. They debuted with Mozart, l'opéra rock.

Rei has played a large amount of roles. Notably, she took part in all Star Troupe Roméo et Juliette productions, and played Romeo both in newcomer and main stage performances; played four female roles (including Love in Roméo et Juliette); had a lead role in two productions of French rock operas (rock musicals) (Mozart, l'opéra rock and Le Rouge et le Noir); played Luce in 2012 A Second Fortuitous Meeting 2nd which became the lead role in 2022 A Second Fortuitous Meeting Next Generation. In 2021, she won the Rookie Award for her performance in The Yagyu Ninja Scrolls / More Dandyism! at the 76th Japan Arts Festival Awards in the Theater category.

In August 2023, she was absent from 1789: Les Amants de la Bastille run for four days (August 19 - 23), and her role of Ronan Mazurier was understudied by Chisei Akatsuki. She resumed on August 24th, but went on the hiatus during Star Troupe run of Me and My Girl and came back for RRR x TAKA"R"AZUKA in January 2024.

In April 2024, it was announced that Rei's partner Hitomi Maisora will retire on December 1st, 2024, after which Rei will not have an assigned musumeyaku partner. They performed together for 5 years.

In September 2024, it was announced that Makoto Rei will leave the revue on August 10th, 2025, 5 years and 10 months since Top debut. This made her a Top Star with the third longest official run (at the moment of her graduation), after Star Troup Top Star Reon Yuzuki (6 years), and Cosmos Troupe Top Star Yoka Wao (6 years, 2 months).

== Biography ==
Makoto Rei's father is Tetsuya Asano, a former member of the Japanese national soccer team. She graduated from Tokai University Urayasu School. Her nicknames include Koto or Coto, Kocchan, Makotsuan, and others like Rei-san and Makko-chan. She has a Shiba Inu named Saborou.

Her idol is Reon Yuzuki. The first performance that Rei saw was Star Troupe's The Dragon Star (2005) and she became her fan. The character "礼" (rei) in Makoto's stage name comes from her stage name (柚希礼音, Yuzuki Reon). Rei's first stage debut (初舞台, hatsubutai) happened to be the same year as Yuzuki's Top Star debut in The Legend Ver.II (2009). Four of Rei's newcomer roles were portrayed by Yuzuki in the main stage performances (her last lead newcomer performance was also a last show for Yuzuki). Like her, Rei remained in the Star Troupe, became a nibante after 8 years and a Top Star after 10 years in the revue. The musicals A Second Fortuitous Meeting, which were originally performed with Reon Yuzuki, got a sequel with Rei's original minor role of Luce becoming the lead one in A Second Fortuitous Meeting Next Generation. They both portrayed Romeo in Roméo et Juliette and Chauvelin in The Scarlet Pimpernel.

She and her classmate Rei Yuzuka had similar career paths. Both had their first Bow Hall lead roles in 2014 (back to back) and both were based on Russian literature (The Seagull and First Love). They also both became Top Stars in 2019 with one month difference and without transfers. They also both won the 2021 Takarazuka Excellence of the Year Award. In 2021, her classmate Kanato Tsukishiro also became a Top Star, and in 2024 Rei appeared on the closing Eternal Voice performance to give her retirement flowers.

Rei is a close friend of her classmate Yuria Seo. They both were assigned to Star Troupe following their debut; after Hikaru Aizuki's retirement in 2021, Seo became second-ranking otokoyaku, beginning from A Second Fortuitous Meeting and until her transfer to Senka (Superior members) in 2023. In the Sky Stage program "Gather! 95th Class", Rei said: "[Seo's] presence has always been central among my friends". Seo also appeared in Rei's 2024 photobook "Unlimited".

== Stage roles ==
=== Notable Takarazuka roles ===
As a Top Star

- 2024, "Big Fish" - Edward Bloom
- 2024, "RRR x TAKA"R"AZUKA" - Komaram Bheem
- 2023, "1789: The Lovers of Bastille" - Ronan Mazurier
- 2023, "The Red and the Black" - Julien Sorel
- 2022, "A Song for Kingdoms" - Radames
- 2021, "Roméo et Juliette" - Romeo
- 2020, "El Halcon" - Tyrian Persimmon
- 2019, "Mozart, the Rock Opera" - Wolfgang Amadeus Mozart

Star Troupe performances

- 2019, "The Man from Algiers" - Julien Clair
- 2017, "Aterui" - Aterui
- 2017, "The Scarlet Pimpernel" - Chauvelin
- 2016, "Le Muguet" - Lucian
- 2015, "Guys and Dolls" - Adelaide (female role)
- 2014, "Gone With the Wind" - Scarlett O'Hara (female role)
- 2014, "The Seagull" - Konstantin
- 2013, "Roméo et Juliette" - Benvolio, Love

Newcomer performances

- 2015, "Like a Black Panther" - Antonio de Odalys
- 2014, "Napoléon, the Man Who Never Sleeps" - Napoleon Bonaparte
- 2013, "Roméo et Juliette" - Romeo
- 2011-12, "Ocean's 11" - Linus Caldwell

Concerts / Shows

- 2021, "Verdad!!" (Concert)
- 2018, "Moment" (Dinner Show)
- 2016, "Princesa!!" (Fuu Hinami Music Salon)
- 2015, "N-Style" (Nene Yumesaki Musical Salon)
- 2013, "Reon!! II" (Reon Yuzuki Concert)
- 2012, "Reon!!" (Reon Yuzuki Concert)
