= Rei Yuzuka =

Japanese theatre actress

Rei (Ray) Yuzuka
- 柚香 光
- Pronunciation: ゆずか れい
- Born: 5 March 1992 (age 34); Suginami City, Tokyo Prefecture, Japan
- Education: Takarazuka Music School
- Occupation: Actress
- Years active: 2009-present
- Known for: Flower Troupe Top Star (2019–2024)
- Predecessor: Rio Asumi
- Successor: Sea Towaki
- Awards: 2021 Takarazuka Excellence

Ray Yuzuka (formerly Rei) (柚香 光, born 5 March 1992) is a Japanese actress and a former Takarazuka Revue otokoyaku (男役, "male role"). She was a leading actress ("Top Star") of the Flower Troupe.

== Career ==
In 2007, she passed the Takarazuka Music School entrance exam on the first try, and entered the school as part of the 95th class. In 2009, she debuted in the Cosmos Troupe's performance "Amour, it's something like..." and was later assigned to the Flower Troupe. She graduated 20th in her class.

In 2013, Yuzuka was featured in the "rising star" guidebook NEW GENERATION III. In 2014, she had her first lead role in a newcomer performance (新人公演) (Note: A newcomer performance (新人公演, shinjin kouen) happens once during the main show run and is performed by underclassmen (actresses with less than 7 years in the revue). Young prominent actresses usually have a few newcomer lead roles over the years.) "The Love of the Last Tycoon" as Monroe Stahr. Same year, she had her first main stage lead in a Bow Hall performance of "Nocturne" as Vladimir.

After Toa Serika's transfer in 2017, Yuzuka became the second-ranking otokoyaku (二番手, nibante) (Note: "Nibante" is not a role that is directly announced by the revue. However, it's always clear based on a few factors: when an actress (1) wears a smaller version of Top Star feathers for a final parade of the show, (2) continuously gets a central secondary role and is put above the line in the cast list, (3) has her own lead performances, and (4) frequently appears on the posters, photos, and Sky Stage programs.) of the Flower Troupe after then-Top Star Rio Asumi, starting with "The Poe Clan".

She became the Top Star of Flower Troupe in November 2019. She was the second actress in her class to do so after Makoto Rei. Her Grand Theater debut performance was delayed for four months due to COVID-19. Her first partner was musumeyaku (娘役, "young female role") Yuuki Hana, until Hana's retirement in 2021; Madoka Hoshikaze was then transferred to Flower Troupe and became her second partner.

Yuzuka was a Top Star at the time of 100th Anniversary of the Flower Troupe (2021).

During her 15 years in the revue, she played a large amount of roles. Notably, she played a lead role twice in "Haikara-san: Here Comes Miss Modern" (in 2017 and 2020); she has also portrayed the historical figure of Rudolf, Crown Prince of Austria twice (in "Elisabeth" and "Mayerling"). She portrayed Der Tod in the newcomer performance of "Elisabeth"; she is one of the five actresses who portrayed this role as newcomers and later became Top Stars.

Yuzuka retired from the Takarazuka Revue on May 26, 2024. She and Madoka Hoshikaze decided to graduate together ― first time in Flower Troupe since the co-graduation of Miki Maya and Hosachi Sen in 1998.

Yuzuka modeled for apparel brand Joseph Japan from 2017 until her retirement with the 2023 autumn-winter photoshoot; she also has modeled for stage makeup brand Chacott Cosmetics (2020–2022).

Following the revue retirement, the spelling "Yuzuka Ray" was made official, as only this version is shown on the posters and teasers. The Japanese spelling is the same.

She continues her stage career under the Stardust Promotion talent agency. In November 2024 the official fanclub "RAY COMPANY" was launched.

== Biography ==
She has two older and two younger brothers. As a child, she studied ballet and played the piano.

The first Takarazuka Revue show that she saw live was Moon Troupe's "Higher than the Sky of Paris / Fancy Dance" (2007).

While in Takarazuka Music School, students have to decide whether to become an otokoyaku or a musumeyaku; at the time, Yuzuka's height was in between that expected for male and female roles (around 167 cm). She made the decision on the spot and later commented: "I wonder what would have happened if I had chosen to be a musumeyaku instead [...] Choosing to be an otokoyaku was a big turning point in my life."

In 2016, she adopted a Pomeranian named Noir or Noah (ノア). She saw it at the pet shop during the Takarazuka Precious Star program with Makoto Rei. Before leaving for Tokyo the next day, she called her parents to ask about the dog and later took it home. Since then, Noah has frequently appeared in her photoshoots and various pet-themed Sky Stage programs.

She has named many of her Takarazuka roles as important to her. Among them was the role of Fred Astaire in "Forever Gershwin"; after the show, she stated that Astaire had become the otokoyaku image and dancing role model for her. Later, she played his role in "Top Hat", her favorite performance of Astaire. Other roles that she has identified as important are Rudolf, Crown Prince of Austria and Ijuuin Shinobu, as well as Alan Twilight, Doumyouji Tsukasa, and Franz Liszt. Some of her roles were based on the characters from shōjo manga, and later Yuzuka received illustrations from their original creators (Waki Yamato, Moto Hagio and Yoko Kamio).

Yuzuka has close relationships with her classmates. She is a longtime friend of Maito Minami. In the 2024 Sky Stage farewell program, she expressed that Minami is "more than family" to her. Minami also appeared in Rei's closing "Arc-en-ciel" performance to give her retirement flowers. Yuzuka and her classmate Makoto Rei had similar career paths: both had their first Bow Hall lead performances in 2014 (both were based on Russian literature), they both became Top Stars in 2019 (after ten years in the revue and without troupe transfers), and both won the Takarazuka's 2021 Excellence of The Year Award.

Yuzuka's younger brother used to attend the same high school as Madoka Hoshikaze, her second Top Combi partner, making them acquaintances since Takarazuka Music School. Hoshikaze has also appeared in Rei's Personal Book as a High School Girl in 2016, before becoming Cosmos Troupe Top musumeyaku in 2017.

== Takarazuka works ==
=== Stage roles ===
As a Top Star

- 2023, Singing Lovebirds - Asai Reisaburou
- 2023, Mayerling - Rudolf
- 2022, Years of Pilgrimage - Franz Liszt
- 2022, Top Hat - Jerry Travers
- 2021, Nice Work If You Can Get It - Jimmy Winter
- 2020, Haikara-san: Here Comes Miss Modern - Ijuuin Shinobu

Flower Troupe performances

- 2019, Boys Over Flowers - Doumyouji Tsukasa
- 2018, The Poe Clan - Alan Twilight
- 2016, Me and My Girl - Jacqueline Carlton (female role)
- 2015, The Rose of Versailles - Oscar
- 2014, Elisabeth - Rudolf
- 2014, Nocturne - Vladimir

Newcomer performances

- 2015, The New Tale of Genji - Prince Hikaru Genji
- 2014, Elisabeth - Der Tod
- 2011, Phantom - Sergio

=== Concerts, events, shows ===
- 2024, Expression!
- 2023, Be Shining!!
- 2019, Love Arena (Rio Asumi Concert)
- 2016, Prelude of Yū (Yuu Todoroki Dinner Show)

== Post-retirement activities ==
- 2025, Shinkasen Theater 45th Anniversary Inoue Kabuki [Tan] Retrospective "Tale of the Red Demon" (main role)
- 2025, Mathieu Ganio Special Gala New Year Concert
- 2024, Special Entertainment Stage "Runway"
- 2024, 1st Solo Concert "Tableau" (with guests Yuuki Hana and Madoka Hoshikaze)
