= Sea Towaki =

Japanese theater actress

- 永久輝 せあ
- Pronunciation: とわき せあ
- Born: August 8th Setagaya Ward, Tokyo Prefecture, Japan
- Education: Takarazuka Music School
- Occupation: Actress
- Years active: 2011-current
- Known for: Flower Troupe Top Star (2024–)
- Predecessor: Rei Yuzuka

Sea Towaki (永久輝 せあ, Towaki Sea; born 8 August) is a Japanese actress and a Takarazuka Revue otokoyaku (男役, "male role"). She is a current leading actress of the Flower Troupe ("Top Star").

== Career ==
In 2009, she entered Takarazuka Music School as part of the 97th class. In 2011, debuted in Star Troupe's performance "Nova Bossa Nova / A Second Fortuitous Meeting" and was later assigned to the Snow Troupe. She graduated 6th in her class.

In 2013, Towaki was featured in NEW GENERATION III. In 2015, had her first lead role in a newcomer performance (新人公演) "Lupin III" as Arsene Lupin. She was the first otokoyaku from 97th class to have a lead role. In 2019, had her first main stage lead in a Bow Hall performance "PR×PRince". Same year, she was transferred to Flower Troupe, and became the spokesperson and image model for VISA after Rio Asumi's retirement.

In 2022, had her first lead role in the Flower Troupe with the performance "Paris in the Winter Fog".

On May 27, 2024, she became a Flower Troupe Top Star with her Top Combi partner Top musumeyaku (娘役, "young female role") Misaki Hoshizora. She is the first Top Star from 97th class. Their first performance as leading actresses will be "Don Juan" in July 2024 (in 2016 production of Don Juan, she played Raphael).

== Biography ==
Towaki has an older brother. When she was a child, she was involved in a car accident after which didn't wake up for three days. At the age of four, Towaki started learning classical ballet and later joined a dance club in middle school.

She is a fan of the former Takarazuka Revue Top Stars Sei Matobu and Sumire Haruno; in 2023 she met with Sumire Haruno on Sky Stage program "Dream Concert". Towaki chose her stage name based on the former Top Stars Yuki Amami (they have the same birthday) and Hikaru Asami (first performance that she saw "The Rose of Versailles" with her as a lead). Both of their stage names use the character "海" (umi, meaning sea), and she made a word play on its English pronunciation: "せあ" (Se A). While an underclassman, she was influenced by Seina Sagiri, whose characters she portrayed five times in newcomer performances, four of which were lead roles. She also used to write down all the advice she received from her upperclassmen at that time.

She is a close friend of her classmate Hikari Ayaki. They appeared together in the first episode of the Sky Stage program "Yururi Funwari Futari" (ゆるりふんわりふたり).

== Stage roles ==
=== Notable Takarazuka roles ===
As a Top Star

- 2024, Don Juan - Don Juan

Flower Troupe performances

- 2023, Passion: Jose and Carmen - Don Jose Navarro
- 2023, Singing Lovebirds - Minezawa Tanba no Kami
- 2022, Years of Pilgrimage - George Sand (female role)
- 2022, Paris in the Winter Fog - Octave
- 2021, Nice Work If You Can Get It - Eileen Evergreen (female role)

Snow Troupe performances

- 2019, PR×PRince - Victor
- 2018, Phantom - Sergio, Young Carrière
- 2017, New Wave!
- 2016, Don Juan - Raphael

Newcomer performances

- 2017, Sun in the Last Days of the Shogunate - Saheiji
- 2016, The Wanderer Kenshin - Himura Kenshin
- 2015, Lupin III - Arsene Lupin
