= Junko Asahina =

Japanese actress and singer

- 越後 亜紀子
- Born: 10 August 1953; Shibuya, Tokyo, Japan
- Died: 30 March 2021 (aged 67); Tokyo, Japan
- Education: Takarazuka Music School
- Occupations: Actress; singer
- Years active: 1971–2000s

Akiko Echigo (Japanese: 越後 亜紀子, Hepburn: Echigo Akiko; 10 August 1953 – 30 March 2021), known by the stage names Junko Asahina (朝比奈 順子, Asahina Junko), Jun Kobayakawa (小早川 純, Kobayakawa Jun), and Yuki Kobayakawa (小早川 有希, Kobayakawa Yuki) was a Japanese actress and singer. Originally a musumeyaku at the Takarazuka Revue, she had a struggling career as a television actress and idol singer, and after spending a few years acting in Nikkatsu's Roman Porno pink films, became popular in supporting roles.

== Biography ==
Akiko Echigo was born on 10 August 1953 in Shibuya. Her father and mother were natives of Akita Prefecture and Chiba Prefecture (respectively), and her grandfather was Russian. She was educated at Takarazuka Music School, entering the school in 1969.

In 1971, she joined the Takarazuka Revue; her stage name at Takarazuka was Yuki Kobayakawa and she was a musumeyaku. At the time she joined the Revue, she was ranked 52nd out of 55 members of the 57th class. In 1972, she made her debut in the Flower Troupe production "Hana wa Chiruchiru/Joy!". On 30 October 1972, she left the Takarazuka Revue at the age of 19, and made her debut as an actress the same year under the alias Jun Kobayakawa. Although her career started struggling afterwards, she appeared in television series like Mirrorman, Playgirl, Ultraman Ace, Akai Kutsu, and Tokubetsu Kidō Sōsatai. Outside of acting, she spent time working at a lingerie store in Aoyama, Tokyo.

She also had a short-lived idol career where she released three singles under the name Junko Asahina, with her debut being "Ren'ai Gakkō" (1974), and made some appearances in Japanese music shows. Film critic Naofumi Higuchi said that the reason her career failed was because "pop music [was] lively [at the time] and there were tons of beautiful idols, so she didn't stand out at all". In 1986, she returned to music with another single from Polydor Records, "Futari no Ai/Hitorijime", performing with Takashi Shinjō and F.M.G.

From 1981 to 1984, she had a brief career in Nikkatsu's Roman Porno pink films, appearing in films like Female Teacher's Awakening, I Like It From Behind, Female New Employee: Five To Nine, and Pleasure In the Mirror, and having her own catchphrase "Porno Hatsudenjo" (ポルノ発電所; lt. "Porno Power Plant"); she also received praise for "her beauty and courage". She later returned to acting in television series, including Seibu Keisatsu, Tokusō Saizensen, Mito Kōmon, Edo o Kiru, Meibugyō: Tōyama no Kinsan, Kasuga no Tsubone, as well as in the films Kōshoku Ichidai Otoko (1982), Natsufuku no Eve (1984), and Nidaime no Christian (1985). Sports Hochi described her as a "unique supporting actress", with Higuchi saying that "while she mostly played supporting roles that added a touch of glamour, it is easy to understand why they wanted to invite such a bright, beautiful and dignified actress to the set. However, in the 2000s, her career became less frequent due to ill health.

Asahina was a close friend of fellow Roman Porno actress Yuki Kazamatsuri, remaining so until Asahina's death.

Asahina died of multiple organ failure at a hospital in Tokyo on 30 March 2021. She was 67 years old. She never married. Despite her relatively minor acting career, news about her death appeared on "a surprisingly large number of media outlets". Higuchi said in a 2021 retrospective that "looking back at her in later years, Asahina was a very beautiful girl and acted with bravery, but she left a rather plain impression", and that she "once had a vivid image of lively and sexy".

As of 2002, Asahina lived in Yotsuya, Shinjuku.

== Discography ==
=== Singles ===
Title	Year	Details	Peak chart positions	Sales	Ref.
Title	Year	Details	JPN	Sales	Ref.
"Ren'ai Gakkō/Yukidoke Michi" (恋愛学校/雪どけ道)	1974	Released: 1974; Label: Toho Records	—	—	
"Tabi no Ehagaki/Tokimeku Jiki" (旅の絵葉書/ときめく時期)	1974	Released: 1974; Label: Toho Records	—	—	
"Koibito no Gogo/Haru no Himegoto" ("恋人の午後/春のひめごと")	1975	Released: 1975; Label: Toho Records	—	—	
"Futari no Ai/Hitorijime" (ふたりの愛/ひとり占め) (as Junko Asahina, Takashi Shinjō & F.M.G.)	1986	Released: 1986; Label: Polydor Records	—	—	
