= Jun Shibuki =

Japanese actress

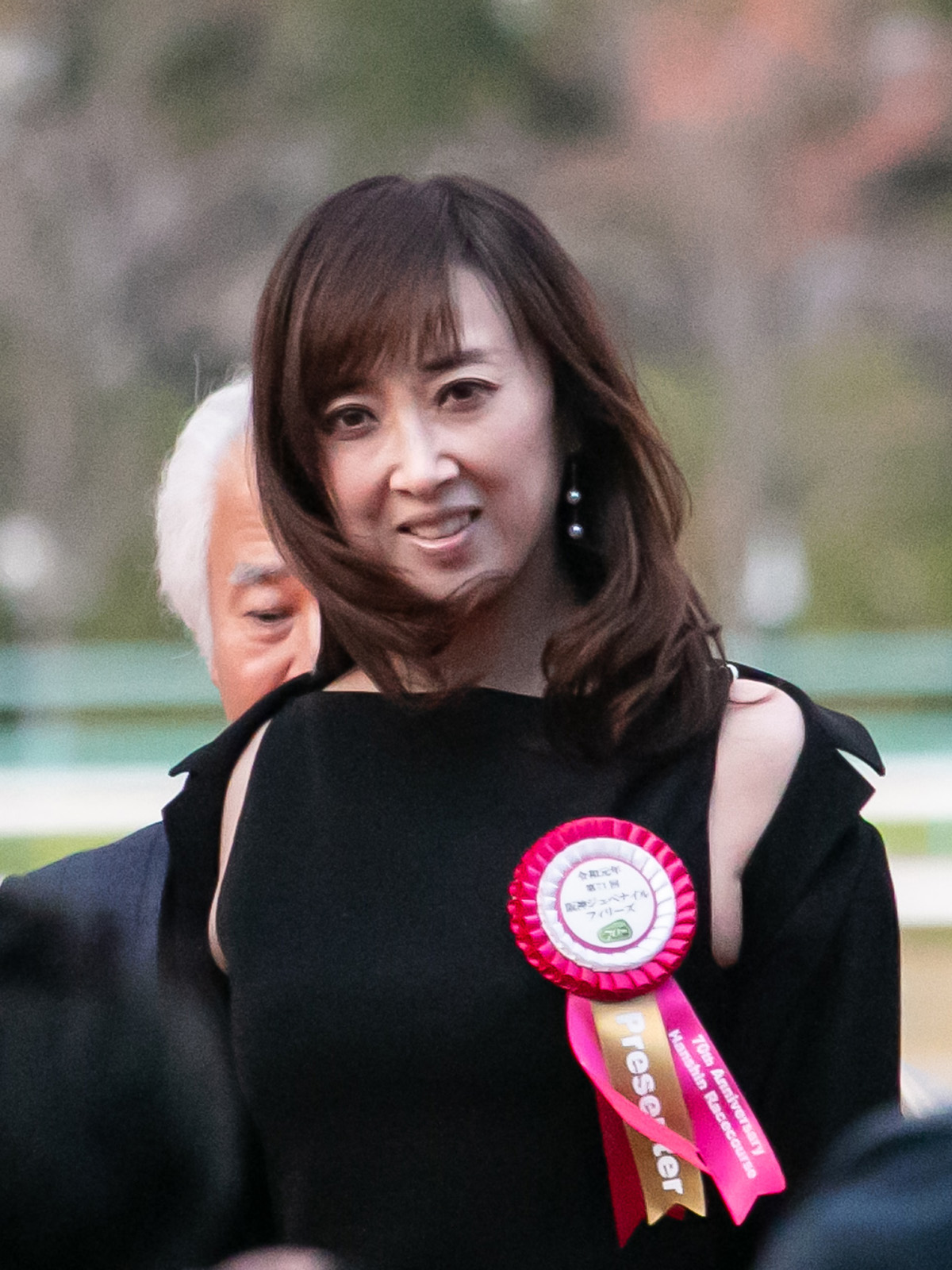
Jun Shibuki

Tanazawa Rika (born November 19, 1969 in Oizumi, Gunma), known by her stage name Jun Shibuki (紫吹 淳, Shibuki Jun), is a Japanese musical actress and stage performer.

Shibuki is a former member of Takarazuka Revue, where she played Otokoyaku. She joined the revue in 1986 and resigned in 2003.

In 2016 she organised a concert to celebrate 30 years in the business.

== Troupe history ==
- Flower Troupe: 1986–1996
- Star Troupe: 1996–1997
- Moon Troupe: 1997–2000
- Supreme Member: 2000–2001
- Moon Troupe: 2001–2004 (Top Star)

== Roles ==
1988: Forever!Takarazuka (shinjinkoen), "White Key Dancer A"
1989: Kaigi wa Odoru (Der Kongreß tanzt) (shinjinkoen), "Max" / The Game, "Demolition Man, Other"
1989: The Romanov Jewel (shinjinkoen), "Cesar"
1989: Takarazuka o Dorisanka'89/Forever! Takarazuka (New York Radio City Hall)
1990: El Amigo (Bow), "Gonzalez"
1990: Versailles no Bara (Rose of Versailles), "Count Waiyu's Wife" / (shinjinkoen) "Alain"
1991: Haru ni Kaze o Kimi ni... (In the Spring the Wind Blows to You...), "Panther Cub" (shinjinkoen) "Shiyuto"
1991: Venezia no Monsho (The Venetian Crest), "Orphan" / (shinjinkoen) "Kazim" / Junction 24, "Tommy, Other"
1991: Dean (Bow), "Big Damon"
1992: Spartacus, "Livius" / (shinjinkoen) "Spartacus"
1992: Keredo Yume no Naka de Mezameta toki ni (But in a Waking Dream) (Bow), "Jun, Naze"
1992: Kokoro no Tabishi (Random Harvest), "David" / (shinjinkoen) "Smith/Charles"
1992: Flower Drum Song (Bow), "Sammy Fong"
1993: Melancholic Gigolo (Tokyo), "Bart" / La Nova! (Tokyo), "Panther Man A, Little Devil, Other"
1993: Bay City Blues, "Falco" / It's a Love Story
1993: Apple Tree (Bow), "Snake, Flip"
1994: Sarang * Ai (Love), "Cho Ryuun"
1994: Black Jack * Abunai na Kake (Black Jack * Dangerous Gamble), "News Reporter" / Hi no Shima (Island of Fire), "Olga, Other"
1994: Kasensho (Brush of a Flower Fan) / Tobira no Kochira (The Door Over Here) / A Million Dreams (London)
1994: Ride On (Bow), "Shingo, Sidney, Other"
1994: Fuyu no Arashi, Petersburg ni Shisu (Winter Storm, Death in Petersburg), "Soolin" / Hyper Stage!, "Racer, Zebra, Other"
1995: Kanashimi no Cordoba (Grieving Cordoba), "Phillipe" / Mega Vision, "Gigolo A, Manbo Man A, Singer, Other"
1995: Eden no Higashi (East of Eden), "Joe" / Dandizm!, "Hardboiled Man S, Other"
1995: Beni wa Kobe (The Scarlet Pimpernel) (National Tour), "Andrew" / Mega Vision, "Gigolo A, White Swan, Other"
1996: Hana wa Hana yori (People Who Love Flowers), "Gyunosuke, Rat A, Fumaru Funojo, Other" / Hyperion, "Leonard, Topaz, Other"
1996: Futari dake ga Warui (Who is Bad?), "Carlos" / Passion Blue, "Lonely Guy, Charles, Other"
1996: The Portrait of Dorian Gray (Bow), "Dorian Gray"
1996: Elisabeth, "Lucheni"
1997: Sei no Gunzo (True Youths), "Katsu Kaishu" / Miwaku II (Captivation II), "Heart Breaker, Charles, Other"
1997: El Dorado (Tokyo), "Walpa"
1997: Alas (Theater Dramacity), "Mikado, Kojiro, Other"
1998: West Side Story, "Bernard"
1998: Buenos Aires no Kaze (Viento de Buenos Aires) (Theater Dramacity), "Nicolas"
1998: Kuroi no Hitomi (Dark Eyes) (based on Proshkin's The Captain's Daughter), "Pugachev" / El Boleo Rouge, "The Man, Orphee, Other"
1999: Rasen no Orphee (Orpheus in Spiral), "Arion" / Nova Bosa Nova, "Ouro"
1999: Mugen Hana Maki (Picture Scroll of Fantasy Flowers) / Bravo! Takarazuka (China, Beijing and Shanghai)
1999: Provence no Aoi Sora (The Blue Skies of Provence) (Theater Dramacity), "Andre"
2000: LUNA, "Brian" / BLUE MOON BLUE, "Naaga"
2000: Takarazuka: Snow, Moon, Flower / Sunrise Takarazuka (Berlin)
2001: Ima Sumirebana Saku (Now, the Violets Bloom) (Moon Troupe) (Tokyo), "Prince, Young Man of the Violets" / Ai no Sonata (Der Rosenkavalier) (Moon Troupe) (Tokyo), "Baron Ochs"
2001: Ai no Sonata (Der Rosenkavalier), "Baron Ochs" / ESP!!, "Coat Man A, Guy A, Tango Man A, Other"
2001: Provence no Aoi Sora (The Blue Skies of Provence) (Theater Dramacity), "Andre"
2001: Daikaizoku (Great Pirates), "Emelio" / Jazz Mania, "G.I. Joe, The Man, The Guest, Other"
2002: Guys & Dolls, "Sky Masterson"
2002: Sarang * Ai (Love) (National Tour), "Cho Ryuun"
2002: Nagai Haru no Hate ni (At the End of a Long Spring), "Stephan" / With a Song in My Heart, "Dick, China Doll, Other"
2003: Hana no Takarazuka Fudoki, "Student, Yamasan, Biased Man S, Other" / Señor Don Juan, "Don Juan"
2003: Bara no Fuin (Seal of Roses) ~Vampire Requiem~ / Francis

== Concerts / Dinner shows ==
- 1996: La Romance (Dinner Show)
- 1996: Mission (Dinner Show)
- 1997: Four Colors (video)
- 2000: ALL ABOUT RIKA (Cosmos Troupe) (Le Theatre Ginza), (Bow)
- 2003: Lica-Rika/L,R Concert (Tokyo Metropolitan Theatre), (Theater Dramacity)
- 2003: Rika (Dinner Show)
