= Reon Yuzuki =

Japanese actress (born 1979)

- 柚希 礼音
- Pronunciation: ゆずき れおん
- Born: Chie Kanayama (金山千恵); June 11, 1979; Osaka Prefecture, Japan
- Occupation: Actress
- Years active: 1999 - present
- Agent: Amuse, Inc.
- Known for: Star Troupe Top Star (2009-2015)
- Notable work: Takarazuka Revue; The Scarlet Pimpernel , Roméo et Juliette, de la Haine à l'Amour, An Officer and a Gentleman, Ocean's Eleven
- Website: reon-yuzuki.jp

Reon Yuzuki (柚希 礼音, Yuzuki Reon; born June 11, 1979) is a Japanese actress and former Takarazuka Revue otokoyaku (男役, "male role") and Star Troupe Top Star. She joined the revue in 1999 and became a Top Star in April 2009. She resigned in May 2015, making this the second longest Top Star run, after Yoka Wao. She signed with Amuse, Inc. and continued her career on stage.

== Biography ==
Yuzuki began learning ballet at the age of nine. She later was considered to be too tall for ballet, so she became interested in Takarazuka Revue with the advice of her father and her dance teacher. After training in singing, acting and dancing for two years, including tap and Japanese classical dance, she graduated from the Takarazuka Music School and made her debut in 1999 in Takarazuka Revue Moon Troupe's production Nova Bossa Nova.

Later in 1999, she joined the Star Troupe. In 2000, she was the youngest performer selected for the Berlin tour. In 2001, she was given the role of André in the New Actor Show of The Rose of Versailles. In 2003, she got her first Takarazuka Bow Hall lead performance Oi, Harukaze-san!. Afterwards, she took the leading role in the New Actor Performances for five consecutive times from 2003 to 2006.

She later progressed to supporting roles in the main troupe's productions. One of her notable roles was Chauvelin in the production of The Scarlet Pimpernel in Japan for the first time in 2008. The Matsuo Arts Foundation presented her with the 30th Rookie Art Award for her performance as Chauvelin. In 2009, after the retirement of former Top Star Kei Aran, she became the top star of Star Troupe.

In 2010, Sylvester Levay wrote the theme song "Candle In Your Mind" for her first original production, The Treasure Sword of Habsburg. Later in the year, Yuzuki received the Rookie Award for Theater from Agency for Cultural Affairs at the 65th ACA Arts Festival in 2010.

In 2011, she played Danny Ocean in the Star Troupe's production of Ocean's 11 and was awarded the Kikuta Katsuo Performance prize for her performance.

She led Takarazuka's first Taiwan tour performance in 2013. In 2014, she led the opening production of Takarazuka Revue's 100th anniversary production of Napoleon playing the lead role Napoleon. Later in the year, she held her first Budokan concert REON in Budokan in Nippon Budokan. She is the second otokoyaku in Takarazuka's history to hold a concert in Nippon Budokan.

She resigned from the Revue on May 10, 2015. Her last Tokyo Takarazuka Theatre performance and farewell show was live streamed at 45 cinemas in Japan and also Taiwan and attracted around 26,000 viewers. After her last performance, around 12,000 fans gathered outside the Tokyo Takarazuka Theatre to bid her farewell, which is the largest number seen in Takarazuka history.

After resigning from the Takarazuka Revue, she signed with Amuse, Inc. and continued her career on stage. In October to December 2015, she joined the cast of the musical production Prince of Broadway (musical) in Japan which celebrated the career of the 21-time Tony-winning director and producer Hal Prince.

In 2016, she played the leading role in "Biohazard: Voice of Gaia", a musical adaptation of the Resident Evil franchise. In 2017, it has been announced that she will join the Japanese production of "Billy Elliot the Musical" playing the role of Mrs. Wilkinson

== Notable roles in Takarazuka ==
=== Newcomer performances ===
- The Rose of Versailles 2001: Oscar and André (2001), André Grandier
- A Song for Kingdom (Aida:Takarazuka version) (2003), Radames (lead role)
- A Love Story in 1914 (2004), Aristide Bruant (lead role)
- Ch'ang-an, Full of Swirling Flowers (2004), Hsüan-tsung (Emperor Xuanzong of Tang) (lead role)
- Shigure Hill Road in Nagasaki (2005), Isaji (lead role)
- The Rose of Versailles: Fersen and Marie Antoinette (2006), Hans Axel Von Fersen (lead role)

=== Star Troupe performance ===
- A Song for Kingdom (Aida :Takarazuka version) (2003), Mereruka
- Hello, the Spring Wind (2003), Seita (first lead role at Takarazuka Bow Hall)
- Still the Ship Sails on (2005), Johny Case (lead role)
- The Dragon Star (2005), Li Muei
- The Rose of Versailles: Fersen and Marie Antoinette (2006), André Grandier / Bernard Châtelet / Alain de Soissons
- Young Bloods!! -Twinkle Twinkle Star- (2006) (lead role)
- Hallelujah Go! Go! (2007), Dennis Garcia (lead role)
- Sakura / Secret Hunter (2007), Sergio
- Kean (2007), Prince of Wales
- El Halcon / Revue Orchis (2007-2008), Luminous Red Benedict
- The Red and the Black 2008), Fouqe/Prince Korasoff
- The Scarlet Pimpernel (2008), Chauvelin
- Viento de Buenos Aires (2008), Nicolas (lead role)
- My Dear New Orleans / A Bientô (2008), Leonard Duan

=== Star Troupe Top Star ===
- The Legend Ver.II (2009), Damdeok (Top Star debut)
- Saikai (Meeting again) / The Soul of Shiva! (2009), Gerard (The National Tour)
- The Treasure Sword of Habsburg-Candle in Your Mind- / Bolero (2010), Eliyahu Rothschild / Eduard von Autheville
- Passion: Jose and Carmen / Bolero (2010), Jose (The National Tour)
- Roméo et Juliette, de la Haine à l'Amour (2010), Romeo
- Takarazuka Hana no Odori Emaki / An officer and a gentleman (2010), Zachary "Zack" Mayo
- Too Short a Time to Fall in Love / Le Poison - Love Potion II (2011), Fred Walbask (Chunichi Theatre)
- Nova Bossa Nova - Sol / A Second Fortuitous Meeting -My Only Shinin' Star- Based on The Game of Love and Chance - Le Jeu de l'amour et du hasard by Marivaux (2011), Dorante Vespert
- Ocean's 11 (2011-2012), Danny Ocean
- Reon!! (2012)
- Dança serenata / Celebrity (2012), Isaque
- In the Amber-hued Rain / Celebrity (2012), Claude de Bernard (The National Tour)
- Takarazuka Japonisme / A Second Fortuitous Meeting 2nd / Etoile de Takarazuka (2012-2013), Dorante Vespert
- The Rose of Versailles: Fersen (2013), Andre (Special performance in Snow Troupe)
- Roméo et Juliette, de la Haine à l'Amour (2013), Romeo
- Reon!!II (2013)
- Napoléon, the Man Who Never Sleeps (2014), Napoleon
- The Sun King: Le Roi Soleil (2014), Louis XIV
- The Lost Glory / Passionate Takarazuka! (2014), Ivano Ricci
- Reon in Budokan (2014)
- Like a Black Panther / Dear Diamond!! (2015), Antonio de Odalys (Last performance with Takarazuka)

=== Overseas performances ===
As a member of Takarazuka Revue:

- Takarazuka at Friedrichstadt-Palast in Berlin, Germany (2000)
- Die Lian (Butterfly Love) / Southern Cross Revue in China (2002)
- Takarazuka in Korea 2005: Soul of Shiva !! (2005)
- Takarazuka Japonisme: Modulations / The Bandit Chu Liuxiang Side Story: The Flower Thief / Etoile de Takarazuka in Taiwan (2013)

=== Film ===
- Takarazuka Revue Cinema The Legend Ver. II

== Post-Takarazuka era ==
=== Stage ===
- Prince of Broadway (Oct 23 - Nov 22 2015 Tokyu Theatre Orb; Nov 28 - Dec 10 2015 Umeda Arts Theater)
- Biohazard: Voice of Gaia (Sep 30 - Oct 12 2016 Akasaka ACT Theater; Nov 11 - Nov 16 2016 Umeda Arts Theater Main Hall)
- As You Like It (Jan 4 - Feb 4 2017 Theatre Creation)
- Billy Elliot the Musical (July 19 - Oct 1 2017 Akasaka ACT Theater; Oct 15 - Nov 4 2017 Umeda Arts Theater) - Mrs. Wilkinson
- Mata Hari (Jan 22 - 28 2018 Umeda Arts Theater; Feb 3 - 18 2018 Tokyo International Forum Hall C)
- Chikyu-Gorgeous Vol.15: ZEROTOPIA (Apr 9 - May 22 TBS Akasaka ACT Theater; May 29 - Jun 2 Kariya Cultural Center; Jun 9 - 10 2018 Niigata Terrsa; Jun 22 - 24 2018 Fukuoka Sunpalace Hall; Jun 30 - Jul 1 2018 Hiroshima Bunka Gakuen HBG Hall; Jul 6-15 2018 Nakanoshima Festival Tower)
- Kaze no Matasaburo （唐版 風の又三郎）(Feb 8 - Mar 3 Bunkamura Bunkamura Theatre Cocoon; Mar 8 - 13 Morinomiya Piloti Hall)
- REON YUZUKI one-man show: Musical LEMONADE (May 24 - Jun 9 CBGK; Jul 13 - 15 Umeda Arts Theater Drama City)
- Hyoen 2019 (Jul 26 - 28 2019 Yokohama Arena)
- A New Musical: FACTORY GIRLS (Sep 25 - Oct 9 2019 Akasaka ACT Theater; Oct 25 - 27 2019 Umeda Arts Theater Main Hall)
- The Bodyguard (2022) - Rachel Marron

=== Concerts ===
- Reon Jack (Mar 11 - 17 2016 Umeda Arts Theater Main Hall; Mar 26 - Apr 11 2016 Tokyo International Forum Hall C)
- Reon Jack 2 (Mar 23 - 26 2017 Umeda Arts Theater Main Hall; Mar 30 - 31 2017 National Convention Hall of Yokohama; Apr 19 - 20 2017 Fukuoka Civic Hall)
- Reon Jack 3 (Oct 19 - 21 2018 Tokyo International Forum Hall C; Nov 8 - 11 2018 Umeda Arts Theater Main Hall)
- REON YUZUKI 20th ANNIVERSARY DINNER SHOW 『REON/GO ON！』(Mar 23 - 24 2019 Prince Hotels & Resorts, Hiten; Mar 28 - 29 2019 Hotel Hankyu International, Shion)

=== Film ===
- Hold Your Hand (2023)
- Lumberjack the Monster (2023)

== Books ==
- 「夢をかなえるために、私がやってきた5つのこと」(The Five Things I Have Done To Make My Dreams Come True) (Kadokawa 2015)

== Discography ==
- Until I Sleep in the Night Sky (CD - Released on June 18, 2011)
- R+ (CD/DVD - Released on February 24, 2016)
- REONISM (CD/DVD - Released on March 1, 2017)
- R ing (CD/DVD - Released on September 26, 2018)

== Awards ==
- The 30th Rookie Art Award for her performance (2009, Matsuo Art Foundation) as Chauvelin in The Scarlet Pimpernel (2008); as Nicholas in ブエノスアイレスの風 (Winds in Buenos Aires)
- The 65th Rookie Award for Theater for her performance (2010, ACA Arts Festival) as Zachary "Zack" in An officer and a gentleman
- The 37th Performance Prize for her performance (2011, Kikuta Katsuo Performance prize) as Danny Ocean in Ocean's Eleven

Preceded by Kei Aran	Top Star (Otokoyaku) for Star Troupe; 2009-2015	Succeeded by Kairi Hokushou
