= Takarazuka Revue =

Japanese all-female theatre troupe

Coordinates: 34°48′26″N 135°20′47″E

- 宝塚歌劇団
- Read western style, left-to-right, then top-to-bottom

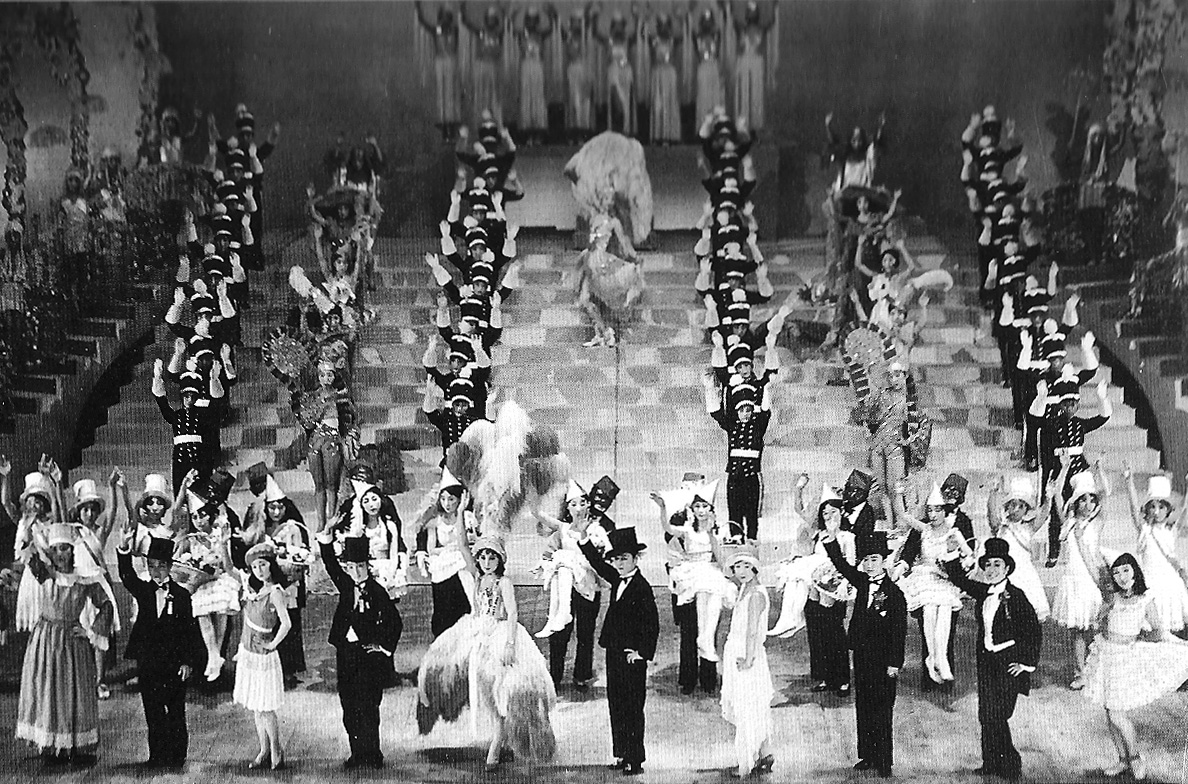
- Parisette, 1930
- Formation: 1913
- Type: Theatre group
- Purpose: Musical theatre
- Locations: Takarazuka; Hyōgo Prefecture; Japan
- Website: kageki.hankyu.co.jp

The Takarazuka Revue (Japanese: 宝塚歌劇団, Hepburn: Takarazuka Kagekidan) is a Japanese all-female musical theatre troupe based in Takarazuka, Hyōgo Prefecture, Japan that was formed in 1913. Women play all the roles in Broadway-style productions of musicals and stories adapted from films, novels, shōjo manga, and Japanese folktales. The Takarazuka Revue Company is a wholly owned subsidiary of the Hankyu Railway company.

== History ==
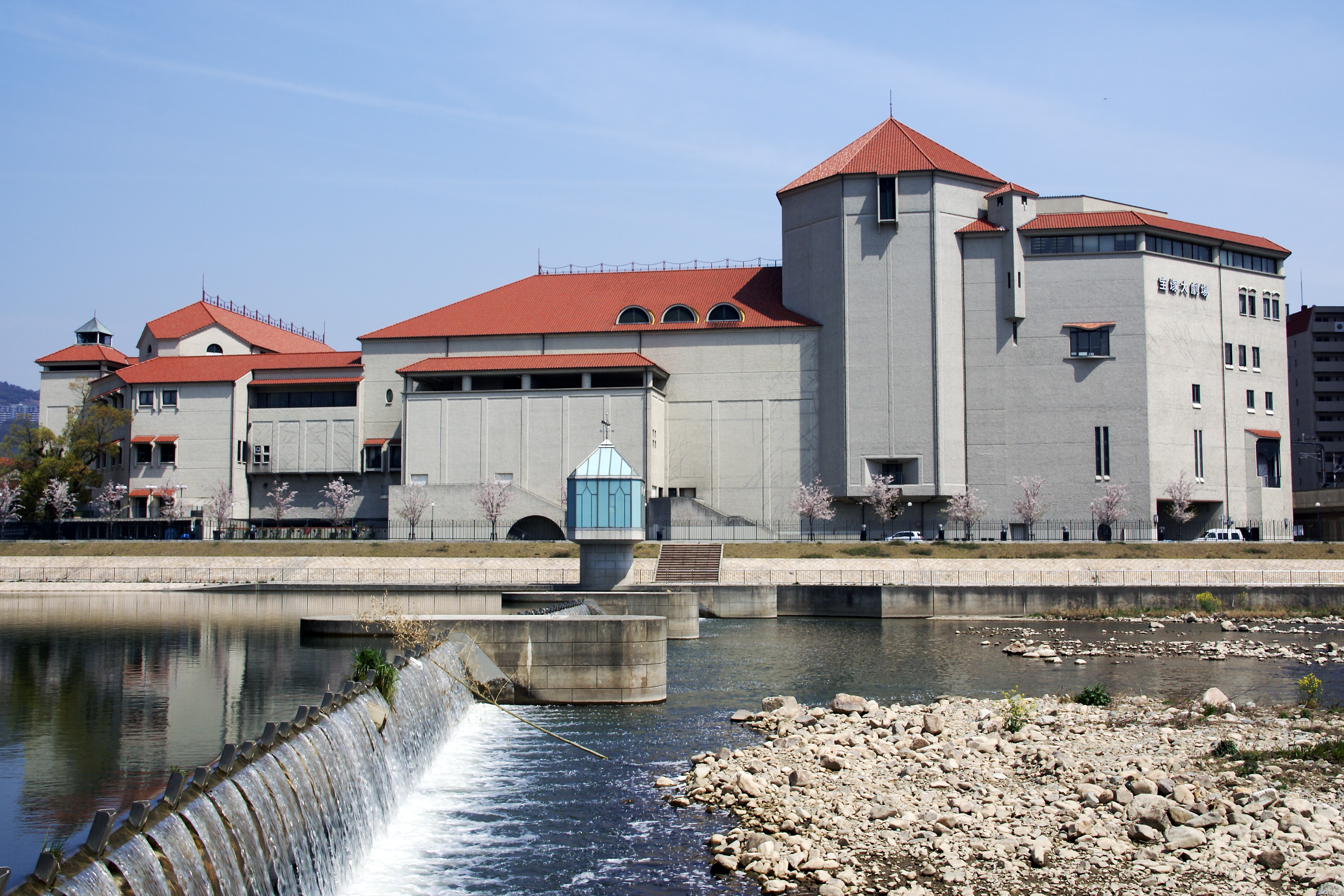
Takarazuka Grand Theater (Hyōgo Prefecture)

The Takarazuka Revue was founded by Ichizō Kobayashi, an industrialist-turned-politician and president of Hankyu Railways, in Takarazuka, Japan in 1913. The city was the terminus of a Hankyu line from Osaka and already a popular tourist destination because of its hot springs. Kobayashi believed that it was the ideal spot to open an attraction of some kind that would boost train ticket sales and draw more business to Takarazuka. Since Western song and dance shows were becoming more popular and Kobayashi considered kabuki theater to be old and elitist, he decided that an all-female theater group might be well received by the general public.

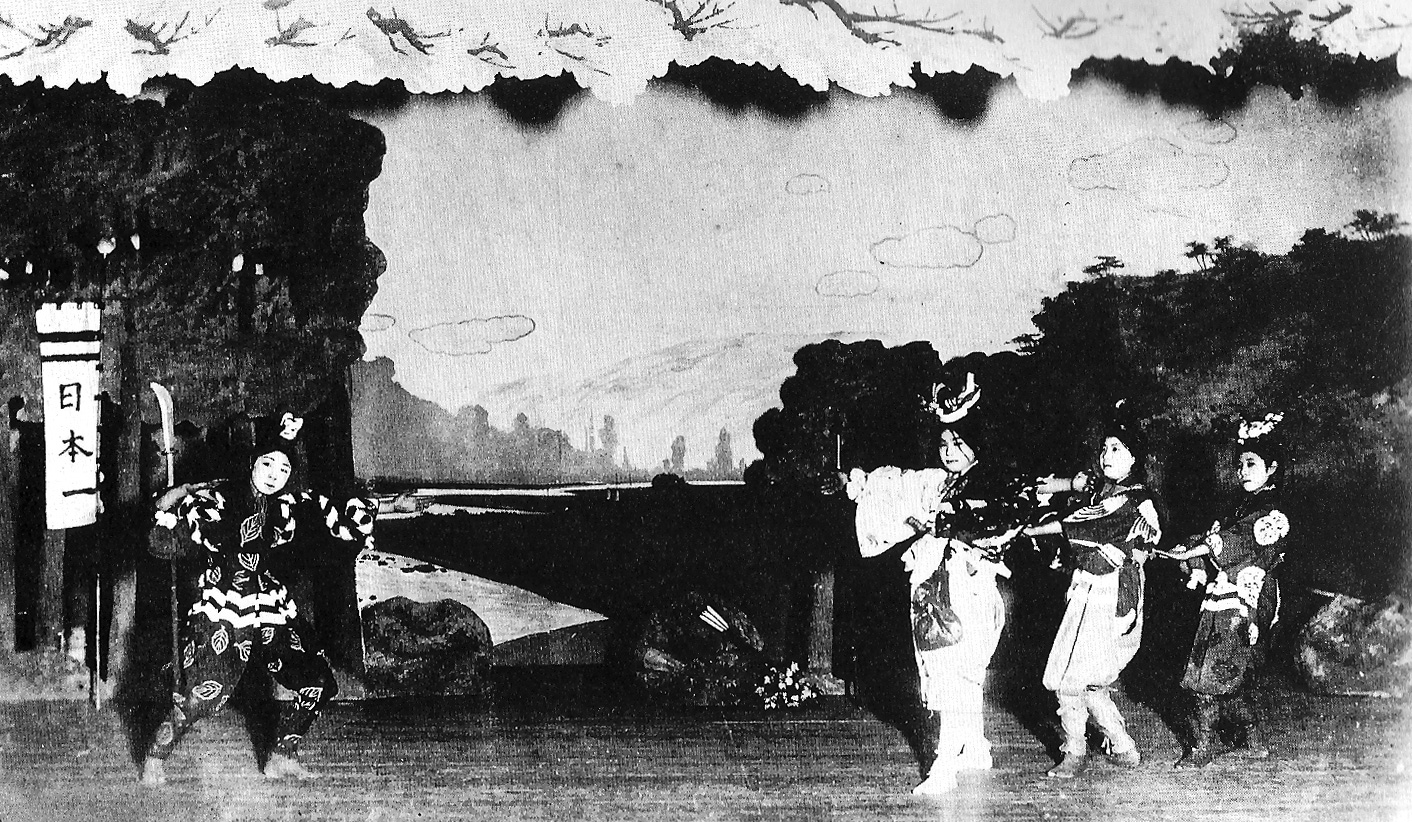
The first performance, Donburako, in 1914

The Revue had its first performance in 1914. Ten years later, the company had become popular enough to get its own theater in Takarazuka, the Dai Gekijō, meaning Grand Theater. In 1934, the company opened the Tokyo Takarazuka Theater, which then underwent a renewal in 2001. In 1978, the Bow Hall Theater was opened within the same complex as the Grand Theater. Seating 500, the Bow Hall features smaller shows that run for just over a week, and which often lack the grandiosity of Grand Theater shows. Currently, Takarazuka performs for 2 million people each year.

The company has five troupes: Flower (花, hana), Moon (月, tsuki), Snow (雪, yuki), Star (星, hoshi) and Cosmos (宙, sora), as well as Superior (専科, senka), an emeritus troupe for senior actresses no longer part of a regular troupe who still wish to maintain their association with the revue and perform from time to time. Flower and Moon are the original troupes, founded in 1921. The Snow Troupe was founded in 1924, followed by the Star Troupe in 1931 (it was disbanded in 1939 and was later reestablished in 1948). Cosmos, founded in 1998, is the newest troupe.

The Revue faced many challenges during World War II. They were only allowed to perform in the Japanese language, forced to perform militaristic shows, and their theater was requisitioned by the military late in the war. They could not reopen until 1946, after the war ended.

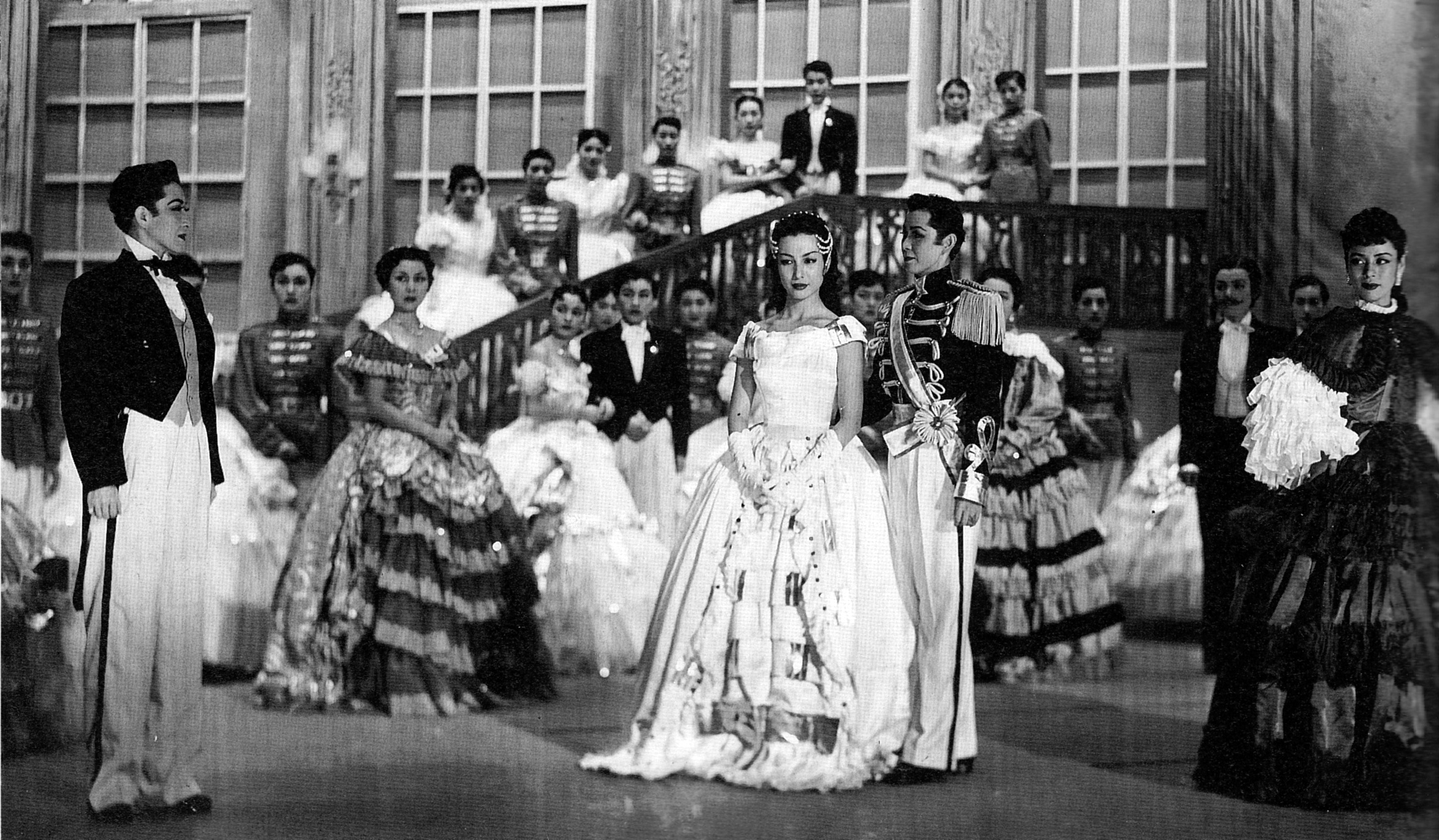
A historical photograph of a stage performance; all of the actors are women, some of whom are cross-dressing drag kings.

Although traditionally an all-female troupe, in 1946 Takarazuka employed male performers who were trained separately from the female members of the troupes. Ultimately, however, the female members opposed these new male counterparts, and the department was dissolved, the last male department closing in 1954. A 2007 Japanese musical, Takarazuka Boys, was based on this chapter of the company's history.

Each Grand Theater show will typically perform for one month in the Takarazuka Grand Theater before a three-week break, followed by a one-month run in the Tokyo Theater. Tickets are famously difficult to acquire, though are not considered to be incredibly expensive – the cheapest ticket available for a Grand Theater performance is 3500 yen, and the most expensive is 12,500 yen. All tickets for Bow Hall performances are 6500 yen, regardless of seat assignment.

The costumes, set designs, and lighting are lavish and the performances melodramatic. Side pathways extend the already-wide proscenium accommodating elaborate processions and choreography. Regardless of the era of the musical presented, period accuracy is relaxed for costumes during extravagant finales which include scores of glittering performers parading down an enormous stage-wide staircase, known as the ōkaidan, and a Rockette-style kick line. Lead performers portraying both male and female roles appear in the finale wearing huge, circular, feathered back-pieces reminiscent of Las Vegas or Paris costuming.

== Actors ==
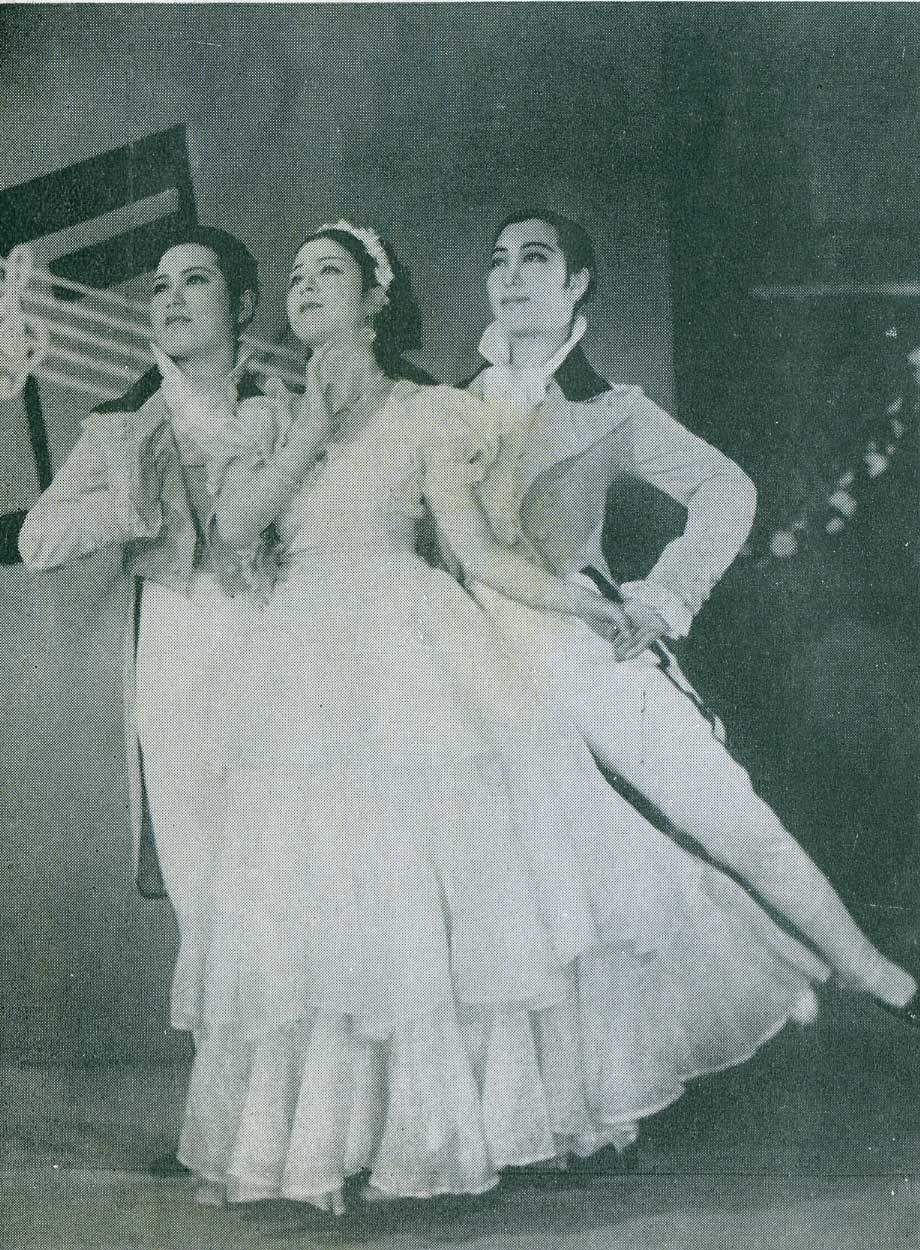
A musumeyaku is flanked by two otokoyaku, c. 1935.

The Takarazuka Revue is an all-female troupe and the performers are called "Takarasiennes". This name derives from the revue's fondness of the French revues and the word "Parisienne". The women who play male parts are referred to as otokoyaku (男 役, "male role") and those who play female parts are called musumeyaku (娘 役, "girl role").

Before becoming a member of the troupe, a young woman must train for two years in the Takarazuka Music School, one of the most competitive of its kind in the world. Each year, thousands from all over Japan audition. The 40 to 50 who are accepted are trained in music, dance, and acting, and are given seven-year contracts. The school is famous for its strict discipline and its custom of having first-year students clean the premises each morning.

All first-year women train together before being divided by the faculty and the current troupe members into otokoyaku and musumeyaku at the end of the year. Those playing otokoyaku cut their hair short, take on a more masculine role in the classroom, and speak in the masculine form.

The otokoyaku, however, is not bound to her assigned male role in the theater. Tsurugi Miyuki, top otokoyaku star of the Moon Troupe, said that she conceived male impersonation as just a "role" that she wore like the makeup and costume that helped create her otokoyaku image. She said she reverts to her nonperforming "feminine" self after performance. Other otokoyaku feel uncomfortable switching to female roles. Otokoyaku Matsu Akira, who retired in 1982, stated: "Even though I am a female, the thing called 'female' just won't emerge at all." Most actresses refer to otokoyaku as an "image", which they learn to create on stage.

While the casts are all-female, the staff (writers, directors, choreographers, designers, etc.) and orchestra musicians are predominantly male. It is not uncommon, however, in Takarazuka for a mostly male orchestra to be led by a female conductor.

=== Troupes ===
The actors are divided into five troupes (組, kumi) which each have their own style and material.

==== Flower Troupe (Hana-gumi) ====
The Flower Troupe is considered the "treasure chest" of otokoyaku. Many of the most popular former and current top stars of the company originated in the Flower Troupe; these include Miki Maya (who held the first Budokan solo concert in Takarazuka's history), Sumire Haruno and Tomu Ranju of Flower, Jun Shibuki, Jun Sena and Kiriya Hiromu of Moon, and Hikaru Asami of Snow. Their performances tend to have larger budgets, with lavish stage and costume designs, and are often derived from operatic material.

==== Moon Troupe (Tsuki-gumi) ====
While tending to be a home for young performers (with Yūki Amami in her sixth year reaching the status of top star in the 1990s), the members of the Moon Troupe are also strong singers. The term "Musical Research Department" is occasionally used in articles about the troupe, underscoring the troupe's focus on music. Their material tends toward drama, Western musicals, and modern settings, such as Guys and Dolls and Me and My Girl. During the era of Makoto Tsubasa as top star, they had at least two musicals adopted from classic western novels.

==== Snow Troupe (Yuki-gumi) ====
The Snow Troupe is considered the upholder of traditional dance and opera for the whole company, being the vanguard of traditional Japanese drama in a company that tends towards Western material. They were the first troupe to perform Elisabeth in Japan. The troupe has been moving towards the opera and drama style of the Moon and Flower troupes.

==== Star Troupe (Hoshi-gumi) ====
The Star Troupe tends to be the home of Takarazuka's stars. They, along with the Flower Troupe, have very strong otokoyaku players. In recent years, many of the company's prominent musumeyaku have also originated from the Star Troupe, such as Hana Hizuki, Shizuku Hazakura, and Yuki Aono.

==== Cosmos Troupe (Sora-gumi) ====
Cosmos, the newest troupe, is less traditional and more experimental. The Cosmos style is influenced by performers like Asato Shizuki, the founding otokoyaku top star; Yōka Wao and Mari Hanafusa, the "Golden Combi" who headed the troupe for six of its first eight years. Cosmos was the first troupe to perform Phantom and to have a Broadway composer (Frank Wildhorn) write their musical score. Most of the otokoyaku in this troupe are above 170 centimetres (5 ft 7 in) tall (the most notable is Hiro Yuumi, the tallest in the company since she joined in 1997 until her retirement in 2013). While it had a troupe-born actress become musumeyaku top back in 2006 with Asuka Toono, it was not until 2014 that an actress originating from this troupe became an otokoyaku top star: Seina Sagiri, the former top star of the Snow Troupe (2014–2017).

==== Superior Members (Senka) ====
While not necessarily being a troupe, members of the Takarazuka Revue who do not take part in any of the troupes mentioned above are called "Superior Members (Senka)". These members usually have one of a few roles in the troupe: playing a fukeyaku (role of old person), playing a supporting role, playing the role of elderly guys, etc. There can also be cases of playing the main role as an otokoyaku, in a play alongside other troupes such as former top stars Yachiyo Kusagano and Yu Todoroki as well as plays where all partaking members are superior members, such as Hanakuyō, in 1984.

== Performances ==
=== Adaptations of Western works ===
While the majority of Takarazuka works are written "in house" by members of the creative staff, they are often adapted from Western classic musicals, operas, plays, novels or films:

Novels:

- Anne Golon's Angélique series
- Alexander Pushkin's The Captain's Daughter (as Dark Brown Eyes) and Eugene Onegin
- Alexandre Dumas's The Count of Monte Cristo
- Anthony Hope's The Prisoner of Zenda
- Antoine François Prévost's Manon Lescaut
- Charles Dickens's A Tale of Two Cities and Great Expectations
- Edith Wharton's The Age of Innocence
- Emily Brontë's Wuthering Heights
- Erich Maria Remarque's Arch of Triumph
- Ernest Hemingway's For Whom the Bell Tolls
- F. Scott Fitzgerald's The Great Gatsby, The Last Tycoon and The Diamond as Big as the Ritz
- Fyodor Dostoyevsky's The Brothers Karamazov
- Henry Fielding's Tom Jones
- Jane Austen's Pride and Prejudice
- James Hilton's Random Harvest
- John Steinbeck's East of Eden
- Johnston McCulley's Zorro
- Leo Tolstoy's Anna Karenina and War and Peace
- Margaret Mitchell's Gone with the Wind
- Oscar Wilde's The Picture of Dorian Gray
- Pierre Choderlos de Laclos's Les Liaisons dangereuses (as Romanesque Mask)
- Prosper Mérimée's Carmen (as Passion: Jose and Carmen)
- Stendhal's The Red and the Black and The Charterhouse of Parma (as Passionate Barcelona)
- Vicente Blasco Ibáñez's Blood and Sand

Films:

- An Officer and a Gentleman
- Bonnie and Clyde
- Casablanca
- Dis-moi oui... (as At the End of a Long Spring)
- Farewell My Concubine/The Phantom Lover (as Singing in the Moonlight)
- JFK
- RRR
- Sabrina
- Somewhere in Time
- Ocean's 11
- Once Upon a Time in America

Operas:

- Aida (under the name Song of the Kingdom)
- Der Rosenkavalier (as Love Sonata)
- Il trovatore (as A Kiss To The Flames)
- The Tales of Hoffmann
- Tristan und Isolde (as Elegy)
- Turandot (as Legend of the Phoenix: Calaf & Turandot)
- Véronique
- Andrea Chénier (as The Poem of Love and Revolution ~Andrea Chénier~)
- Madame Butterfly (as Concise Chōchō-san, 1931)

Musicals:

- 1789: Les Amants de la Bastille
- The Apple Tree
- Anastasia (musical)
- Can-Can
- Carousel
- Chicago
- Catch Me If You Can
- Cinderella
- Copacabana
- Elisabeth
- Ernest in Love (an adaptation of The Importance of Being Earnest)
- Flower Drum Song
- Grand Hotel
- Guys and Dolls
- How to Succeed in Business Without Really Trying
- I Am from Austria
- Kean
- Kiss Me Kate
- La Légende du roi Arthur
- Le Roi Soleil
- Me and My Girl
- Mozart, l'opéra rock
- Oklahoma!
- On a Clear Day You Can See Forever
- One Touch of Venus
- Phantom
- Roméo et Juliette, de la Haine à l'Amour
- Singin' in the Rain
- The Scarlet Pimpernel
- The Sound of Music
- Top Hat
- West Side Story

Plays:

- Shakespeare's Romeo and Juliet, Twelfth Night, Julius Caesar (under the name Rome at Dawn), Much Ado About Nothing, The Winter's Tale and Hamlet
- John Fletcher and Shakespeare's The Two Noble Kinsmen
- Goethe's Faust

=== Adaptations of Japanese works ===
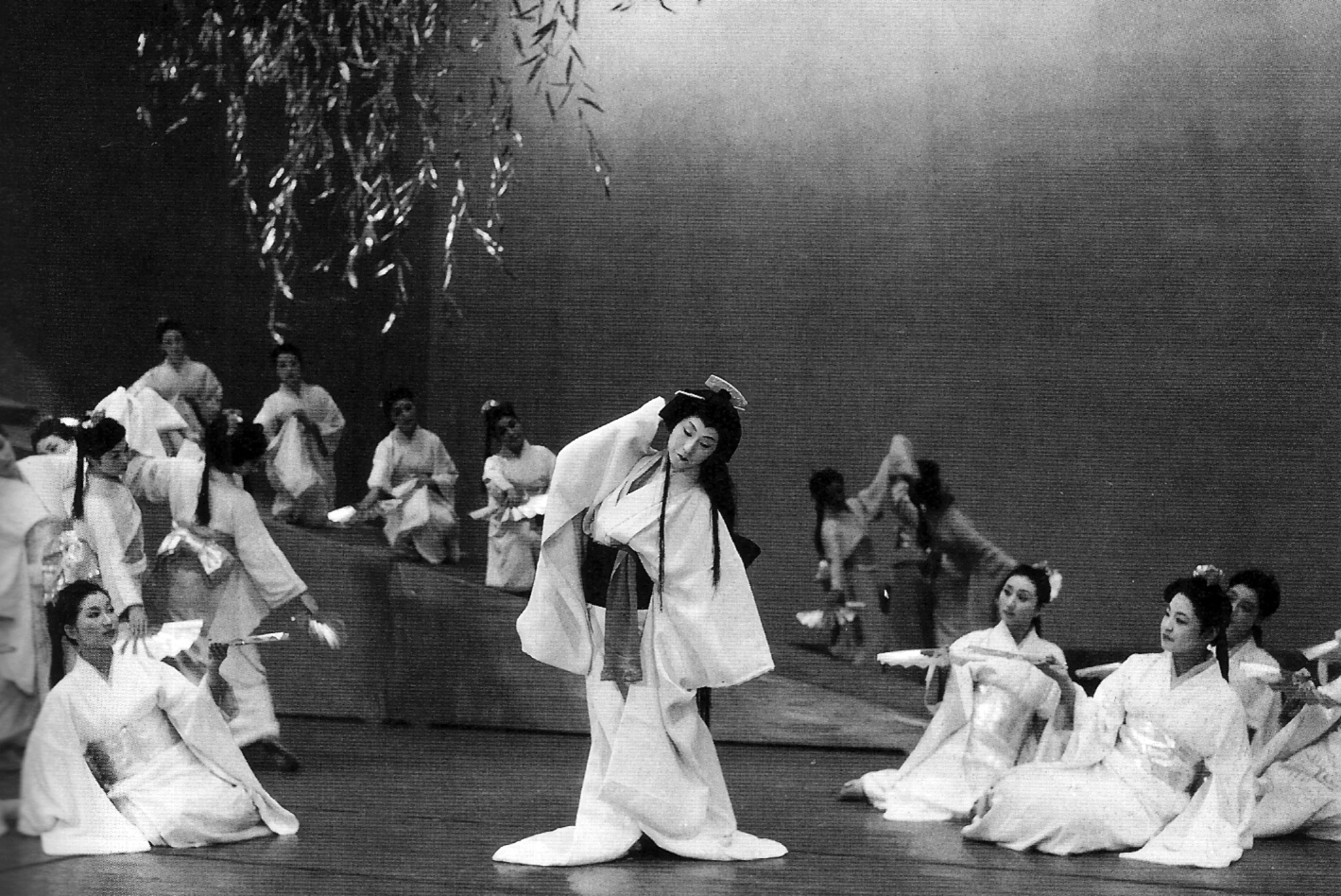
Four Fantasia, 1951

Stories based in Japan and modeled on historical accounts or traditional tales are often referred to as nihonmono (日本物) or, less frequently, wamono (和物). Among the most common of these adapted to the Takarazuka stage is The Tale of Genji.

Popular manga series have often shaped Takarazuka, such as in the case of Riyoko Ikeda's The Rose of Versailles or Moto Hagio's The Poe Clan. Other manga adaptations include The Window of Orpheus, also by Ikeda, Osamu Tezuka's Black Jack and Phoenix, and Yasuko Aoike's El Halcón.

Recent examples of works adapted from Japanese novels or short stories include Moon Troupe's Osaka Samurai (大阪侍), based upon the short story by Ryōtarō Shiba and Flower Troupe's Black Lizard (黒蜥蜴, Kurotokage), based upon the Kogoro Akechi story by Edogawa Rampo.

In 2009, Takarazuka Revue performed two shows based on an adaptation of Capcom's video game series Ace Attorney. They took the stage in January 2013 to represent the courtroom game again with the production titled Prosecutor Miles Edgeworth: Ace Attorney 3. In June 2013, the Revue would debut at Tokyo's Tokyu Theatre Orb an adaptation of another Capcom video game, Sengoku Basara, done by the Flower Troupe. This focused on character Yukimura Sanada, played by Tomu Ranju, the same actress who had taken the role of Phoenix Wright prior to becoming a top star.

In 2017, the Flower Troupe performed a stage adaptation of the shōjo (girls') manga series Haikara-San: Here Comes Miss Modern, and performed it again in 2020. In 2019, the Flower Troupe also performed a stage adaptation of the shōjo manga series Boys Over Flowers. In August 2022, the Cosmos Troupe performed a stage adaptation of the series High&Low in collaboration with LDH.

=== Adaptations of other Asian works ===
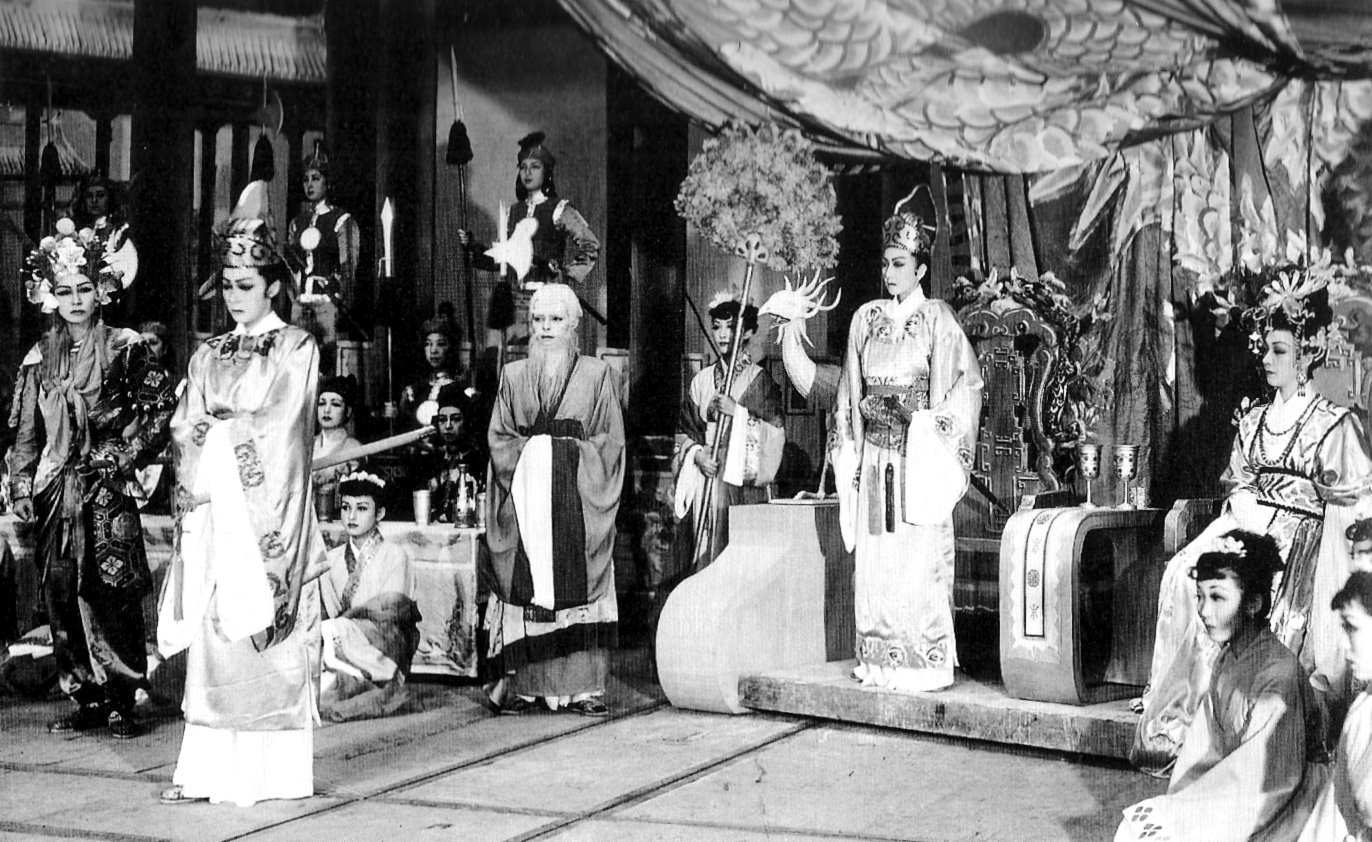
Gubijin (Xiang Yu and Liu Bang), 1951

Among works adapted from other Asian sources is the Beijing opera The Hegemon-King Bids His Lady Farewell, detailing the romance between General Xiang Yu and his lover, Madam Yu.

=== Original stories and historical adaptations ===
Takarazuka has also performed original musicals written "in house" based upon people and events in American, European, and Asian history. Among the more recognizable of these biographical adaptations are Last Party: S. Fitzgerald's Last Day, about F. Scott Fitzgerald; Valentino, about Rudolph Valentino; Dean, about James Dean; and Saint-Exupéry: The Pilot Who Became "The Little Prince", about Antoine de Saint-Exupéry. They created a piece Wind in the Dawn: The Challenge of Shirasu Jirō, Samurai Gentleman about U.S. Occupations of Japan focusing on the rivalry between Shirasu Jirō and General Douglas MacArthur, Supreme Commander for the Allied Powers.

Finally, other original stories round out Takarazuka fare, including musicals such as Boxman by the Cosmos Troupe, Too Short a Time to Fall in Love performed by the Star and Moon Troupes, and Silver Wolf by the Moon and Snow Troupes.

=== Collaborations ===
Takarazuka has occasionally worked with notable writers, composers, and choreographers to create original content for the revue. In 1993, the American Tommy Tune wrote, directed and choreographed the revue Broadway Boys to accompany the Moon Troupe's rendition of Grand Hotel. In 2006, Takarazuka worked with Frank Wildhorn, musical writer and composer of Jekyll & Hyde and The Scarlet Pimpernel, to create Never Say Goodbye for the Cosmos Troupe. In 2019, Takarazuka worked with Dove Attia, the Tunisian music producer of 1789: Les Amants de la Bastille and La Légende du roi Arthur, to compose Casanova for the Flower Troupe.

== Other types of performance ==
=== Dinner shows and music salons ===
High ranking otokoyaku often perform dinner shows towards the middle or end of their careers. Typically held as hotels like the Takarazuka Hotel, Hotel Hankyu International, or the Palace Hotel, dinner shows showcase an actress's popular songs, as well as covers of other non-Takarazuka songs. Attendees pay a premium for food and beverage, as well as a chance to see their star in closer quarters. When a Musumeyaku holds a similar event, it is referred to as a Music Salon. Many actresses continue to do dinner shows even after they have left the company.

=== Specials ===
Every year (with some exceptions) a Takarazuka Special is held, usually for one day only. Members from all five troupes come together for skits, dance and song numbers, as well as lengthy MC portions featuring current and former top-stars. From 1961 to 1982 this was referred to as "Takarazuka Festival". From 1984 to 1994 this was referred to as "Takarazuka Music Publication (TMP) Special". In 1995, TMP was renamed to "Takarazuka Creative Arts" (TCA), and thus specials from 1995 to 2007 were referred to as "TCA Specials". From 2008 to present, this has been simply referred to as "Takarazuka Special".

== Class culture ==
=== Class ===
Each actor is referred to as being part of a Takarazuka Musical School class year, or ki (期), which corresponds with the year in which they graduate the music school. For instance, those graduating the music school in 2024 will be referred to as the 110th class. Before performing for the first time on the Grand Theater stage, the graduating class will perform what they have learned in their time at the school in the Bow Hall, through something called bunkasai (文化祭). Then will then go on to perform with one of the regular troupes for one Grand Theater run before being receiving individual troupe assignments. Before performances featuring the newly graduated class, all class members will appear sitting seiza on stage, wearing hakama. Three of their classmates will then make introductory remarks, before the main show begins. The line dance portion of these shows will be comprised only members of the newly graduated class. Actresses are referred to as students (生徒, seito) from the moment they enter the music school to the moment of their graduation.

=== Seniority ===
The gender-neutral terms senpai (upperclassmen) and kōhai (lowerclassmen) are used to distinguish senior and junior members of Takarazuka. Lowerclassmen are the actresses who have been performers in Takarazuka for less than seven years. They are employees of the company, and usually work as background dancers and in shinjin kōen (performances exclusively for underclassmen). After the seventh year they become upperclassmen, and negotiate contracts with the company instead of being employed by it.

=== Graduation ===
When an actress decides to leave the company, it is often referred to as retirement (退団, taidan), or graduation (卒業, sotsugyō). Actresses will often choose to graduate at the end of a Grand Theater run, but can also announce immediate retirement and forgo any ceremony. In the case of those graduating at the end of a show, they will participate in two graduation ceremonies; one at the end of the final performance at the Grand Theater, and one at the end of the final performance at the Tokyo Takarazuka Theater. Towards the end of the second act of these performances, it is common to see graduating members with flowers pinned to their dress or lapel. Top stars or prominent second-in-line (二番手, nibante) will often get a goodbye performance (さよならショー, sayonara shō), where they are able to perform several numbers from their most cherished and memorable roles. This tradition began in 1963 with the graduation of Akashi Teruko.

Once the performances have concluded, the troupe leader (組長, kumi-cho), will read letters or remarks from the graduating actresses in front of the closed curtain, allowing the graduates to change into their graduation attire, usually hakama, but sometimes a tuxedo for the otokoyaku who favors it. When preparations have finished, the curtain will rise to reveal the entire troupe standing on stage. The troupe leader will then call each member to the stage, where they will descend the grand staircase, before being given flowers from a classmate (同期生, doukisei), as well as from the troupe. For those most senior, it is not uncommon for someone outside the troupe, or someone already graduated, to be called to the stage to give them their doukisei flowers. A song is then sung with troupe members holding each other arm in arm. What follows is a series of remarks from both the graduating actresses and the top star, interspersed with the opening and closing of the curtain as well as the calling of troupe members to and from the stage. Following the fourth iteration of the curtain closing, there is typically an announcement declaring the end of the performance. However, the standing ovation will often continue until the top star slips out in front of the curtain for one final goodbye. Upon the second announcement declaring the end of the performance, audience members begin to disperse.

It is customary for audience members wear white to final performances.

== Personnel ==
=== Star personnel ===
The current top stars of each group are:

Group	Otokoyaku	Musumeyaku
Flower	Sea Towaki	Misaki Hoshizora
Moon	An Houzuki	Juri Amashi
Snow	Jun Asami	Neiro Yui
Star	Chisei Akatsuki	Chizuru Uta
Cosmos	Minato Sakuragi	Sakura Haruno

=== Other main performers in the company ===
Group	Flower	Moon	Snow	Star	Cosmos
Otokoyaku	Asuka Seino, Koki Ichinose, Daiya Yuki, Raito Kinami, Shin Kawami	Yuno Kazama, Haru Reika, Sera Ayami	Yuria Seo, Saki Suwa, Sen Agata, Kei Sakishiro, Kyou Kase	Rukaze Hikaru, Kanon Amato, Kazuto Kishou	Maito Minami, Hikaru Rukaze, Chiaki Takato
Musumeyaku	Kotono Asanoha, Ai Mihane, Hazuki Nanairo	Riri Shirakawa, Manon Hanahime, Reia Nono	Sana Kasumi, Hana Shiraki	Hanaka Ruri, Hiyori Aiha	Mineri Amairo, Haryuu Kiyora, Hibari Yamabuki

== Former Takarasiennes ==
Takarazuka roster members who went on to work in stage, movies, and television include:

Otokoyaku	Musumeyaku
Yūki Amami; Kei Aran; Hikaru Asami; Rio Asumi; Sena Jun; Mao Daichi; Sumire Haruno; Sakiho Juri; Wataru Kozuki; Sei Matobu; Miki Maya; Hiroki Nanami; Tomu Ranju; Chihaya Saeki; Jun Shibuki; Mayo Suzukaze; Fubuki Takane; Yōka Wao; Natsuki Mizu; Yūga Yamato; Reon Yuzuki; Suzuho Makaze; Makoto Rei; Rei Yuzuka	Rei Dan; Shoko Haida; Risa Junna; Mahiru Konno; Rumiko Koyanagi; Hitomi Kuroki; Kaoru Yachigusa; Yukiko Todoroki; Reika Manaki; Ayase Senna; Yūki Hana; Hana Jun; Hana Ranno; Kiho Maaya; Mari Hanafusa; Yumeshiro Aya

== Audience ==
Women make up the primary audience of Takarazuka, with some estimates showing that the audience is 90 percent female. There exist two primary theories as to what draws these women to Takarazuka. These theories, put forward by Western scholars, complement each other, drawing on the traditional homoerotic elements of Japanese performing arts, and the ancient subversive nature of the feminine in Japan. One is that the women are drawn to its inherent lesbian overtones. One author states, "It was not masculine sexuality which attracted the Japanese girl audience but it was feminine eroticism". Another theory is that the girls are not drawn to the implicit sexuality of Takarazuka, but instead are fascinated by the otokoyaku (the women who play male roles) "getting away with a male performance of power and freedom".

Favoring the first theory, American Jennifer Robertson observes that lesbian themes occur in every Takarazuka performance, simply by virtue of the fact that women play every role. The audience clearly picks up on it and responds. Within the first ten years of Takarazuka's founding, the audience was vocally responding to the apparent lesbianism. Female fans wrote love letters to the otokoyaku. In 1921 these letters were published and several years later newspapers and the public rallied a cry against Takarazuka, claiming it was quickly becoming a "symbol of abnormal love". In order to combat this, the producers kept its actresses in strict living conditions; they were no longer allowed to associate with their fans. Robertson mentions a phenomenon of "S" or "Class S" love, a particular style of love wherein women who have been influenced by Takarazuka return to their daily lives feeling free to develop crushes on their female classmates or coworkers. This type of romance is typically fleeting and is seen in Japanese society as more of a phase in growing up rather than "true" homosexuality. Robertson sums up her theory thus: "Many [women] are attracted to the Takarazuka otokoyaku because she represents an exemplary female who can negotiate successfully both genders and their attendant roles and domains."

The other theory, supported by Canadian Erica Abbitt, is that the female audience of Takarazuka is drawn not exclusively by lesbian overtones, but rather by the subversion of stereotypical gender roles. Japan is a society notorious for its rigid conception of gender roles. While the original goal of the show may have been to create the ideal good wife and wise mother off stage, on-stage gender roles are, by necessity, subverted. The otokoyaku must act the way men are supposed to act. Abbitt insists that a large portion of the appeal of Takarazuka comes from something she calls "slippage", referring to the enjoyment derived from a character portraying something they are not, in this case a woman portraying a man. While not denying the presence of lesbian overtones within Takarazuka, Abbitt proposes the cause for the largely female audience has more to do with this subversion of societal norms than sexual ones. In essence, the role of otokoyaku presents a type of androgynous freedom that embraces slippage and a non-constrained continuum of gender. While the actual female otokoyaku performer's masculine persona or "secondary gender" was disapproved of outside of the theatrical purposes of Takarazuka, female fans were able to embrace the full gender-fluid continuum otokoyaku ku provided, as well as engage with Takarazuka in the context of a gender-sex political discourse.

=== Fan clubs ===
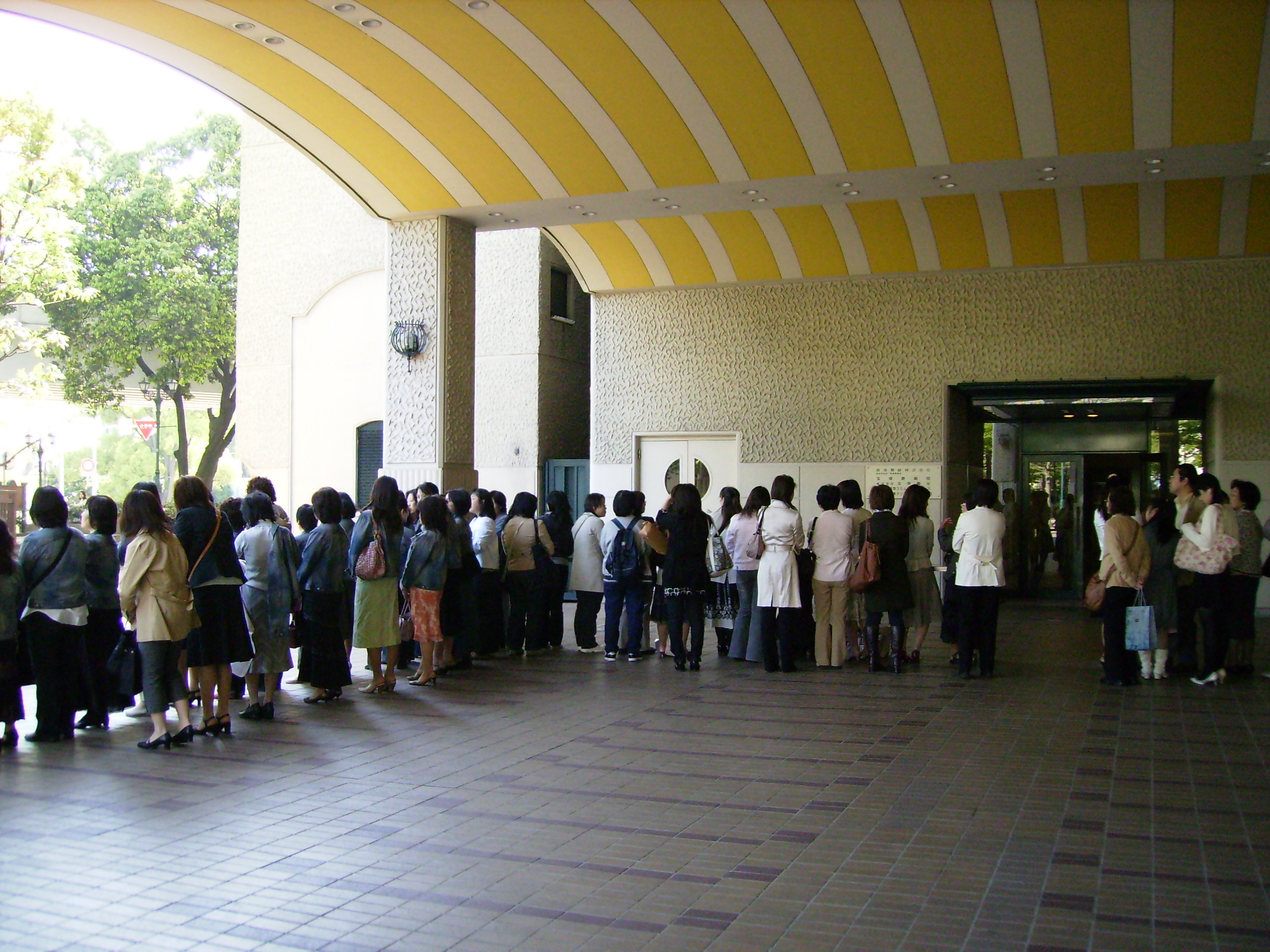
Fan club members

Some fans demonstrate their loyalty to a particular performer by joining her fan club. Club members can be identified by their colored scarves or jackets colorfully embroidered with the star's name. Both prior to and following performances at the Takarazuka Grand Theatre or Tokyo Takarazuka Theatre, as stars enter and exit the theatre, several hundred fans congregate in their various club groups and stand in ranks on either side of the street in front of the building. Fan club members are known as a star's "guard" while other fans present at the assemblies are known as the "gallery". Clubs are arranged by actress seniority within the troupe. Theatre officials set up barricades and oversee the assembly.

Whenever an actress exits the theatre, the frontmost group will sit and all the others follow suit (much like the "wave" seen in athletic arenas) with subsequent intervals of standing and sitting. The fans wait for their favorites to exit the theatre. As the stars come out of the building, they move along with their own fan clubs. Rather than requesting autographs, the fans proffer cards; these are gathered by each star, who may say a few words before moving on. Once the last stars have emerged and departed, the clubs disband.

== Influence and legacy ==
Takarazuka has had a profound influence on the history of anime and manga, especially shōjo manga. Osamu Tezuka, a highly influential manga artist, grew up in the town of Takarazuka. His mother knew many of the Takarazuka actresses, and as a child, he watched many of their performances. Based on their stories of princes played by female actresses, Tezuka created Princess Knight, the first manga aimed at a female audience, which tells the story of Princess Sapphire, a girl born with both a male and female heart who struggles between the desire to fight as a noble prince and to be a tender, gentle princess.

The success of Princess Knight began the tradition of manga written for a female audience, especially The Rose of Versailles and Revolutionary Girl Utena, both of which borrow directly from Princess Knight by including specific images, character designs and names. Women in masculine roles continue to be a central theme in shōjo manga and anime, as well as in some shōnen (boys') series, and Tezuka himself explored the theme in many of his later works.

Many other works of popular media, including films, television series, video games and books show specific influences:

- The Takarazuka Revue inspired the plot of the video game Sakura Wars, along with additional inspiration from Takarazuka's one-time competitor, the Shochiku Kagekidan (Shochiku Revue).
- The Zuka Club in Ouran High School Host Club is based on the Takarazuka Revue.
- The lesbian couple Haruka Tenou and Michiru Kaiou from Sailor Moon were loosely based on gender acting gimmicks of the Takarazuka Revue.
- The Virgin's Mask by Jūrō Kara, a significant work of post-war theater, features an aging "Zuka-girl" attempting to reclaim her youth through ritualistic bathing in a tub of virgins' tears.
- Revue Starlight has elements based on the troupe, including uniforms, the school seal, and theater style, and makes use of these elements to present a critique of Takarazuka practices, particularly the Top Star system.
- The Tokyo theater group Kegawa Zoku ("Fur Tribe") has produced homosexual parodies of classic Takarazuka shows, such as Gone with the Wind.
- Kageki Shojo!! follows two teenage girls enrolled in a fictional version of the Takarazuka Music School, where they train in singing, acting, and dancing, in the hopes of joining the infamous all-female theatre troupe. One of the girls, Sarasa, dreams of playing Oscar François de Jarjayes in the theatre's production of The Rose of Versailles, one of Takarazuka's best-known musicals.
- One episode of Stop!! Hibari-kun! features Wataru Otori, an eccentric drag king who takes on the role of Rhett Butler in Gone with the Wind.
- The 1957 film Sayonara, starring Marlon Brando, is set largely in neighboring Kobe. The all-female "Matsubayashi" theater troupe bears many similarities to the Takarazuka Revue.
- A 1996 black-and-white photograph of moon troupe top star Jun Shibuki, taken by Daido Moriyama, appeared on the October 1999 cover of Art in America.

=== Literature on the subject ===
Though Takarazuka Revue gives the appearance of having been created to grant Japanese women freedom from social oppression, it was created with the opposite intention, with Takarazuka scholar Lorie Brau stating that "The production office and corporate structure that control Takarazuka are overwhelmingly patriarchal." However, although Takarazuka embodies Shiraishi's idea that the actresses become "good wives and wise mothers" upon leaving the company, it also simultaneously represents progressive feminist points of view. Some believe that its appeal to the female audience is on account of the perceived link to freedom from traditional Japanese society's imposed ideas of gender and sexuality. Brau states that while the Takarazuka Revue "reinforces the status quo and sublimates women's desires through its dreamy narratives, there remains some possibility that certain spectators find it empowering simply to watch women play men."

Some Takarasienne shows, such as The Rose of Versailles and Elisabeth, feature androgynous characters. In Brau's view, the otokoyaku represents the woman's idealized man, free from the roughness or need to dominate found in real life. It is these male roles that offer an escape from the strict, gender-bound real roles lauded in Japanese society. In a sense, the otokoyaku provides the female audience with a "dream" of what they desire in reality.

In addition to their claim to "sell dreams", the actresses of the Takarazuka Revue take on another role, empowering themselves as women in a male-dominated culture. Kobayashi's desire to make his actresses into good wives and mothers has often been hindered by their own will to pursue careers in the entertainment business. It is becoming increasingly more common for women to stay in the company well into their thirties, beyond the perceived conventional limits of marriageable age. The actresses' role within the Takarazuka Revue thus overlaps into the culture surrounding it, adding to their appeal to the female-dominant audience. "In fact, it is the carrying over of this 'boyishness' into everyday life and the freedom that this implies that captures the attention of some fans."

=== Takarazuka and homosexuality in Japanese society ===
After the scandal of women writing love letters to the otokoyaku and the revelation of an actual lesbian relationship between a otokoyaku and a musumeyaku, the revue greatly limited itself in order to do away with the lesbian image. Women wore militaristic uniforms, heightening the attraction even more among some audience goers. There was another scandal in 1932 when, for the first time, one of the otokoyaku cut her hair short (previously all of the actresses had their hair long and the otokoyaku simply hid their hair under hats). In August 1940, the actresses were even forbidden to answer fan mail and socialize with their admirers. In the years since then, the regulations have relaxed, but not by much.

== Controversies ==
=== 1958 stage elevator incident ===
On 31 March 1958, during a Flower Troupe performance of Spring Dances: The Children in the Flowers, 21-year-old musumeyaku Hiromi Katsuki died after her dress caught in one of the rotating elevation shafts during her descent on one of the stage elevators. Though that day's performances were cancelled, they resumed the following day, modifying the performance to not include the use of any stage elevators.

Several factors are said to have led to the circumstances of the accident, including the rotation speed of the elevation shaft, the size of the actress’s dress, the way in which the metal frame of the dress was secured to the actresses waist, as well as the inattention of the elevator attendant. The head of Takarazuka City's police department, who was part of the incidents investigation team, suggested that the company should be held criminally liable for professional negligence resulting in death or injury. Beyond rumors of a 50,000 yen fine, it has not been officially reported if any civil action was taken or if any fines were levied following the incident.

Though this event is not officially acknowledged by the company, there remains a cenotaph dedicated to Hiromi in the Takarazuka Music School parking lot, along the Mukogawa river.

=== Cosmos Troupe member suicide ===
On 14 November 2023, Takarazuka executives held a press conference to release findings by an independent committee following the suicide of a 25-year-old Cosmos Troupe member on 30 September. The family of the deceased sought damages and an apology, alleging overwork and workplace harassment as contributors to their daughter's death. Records indicated that the troupe member logged 437 hours of work in August, well exceeding government standards for risk of occupation-related death. She had also told her family about being burned by a hair iron, only sleeping 3 hours a day, and being told "all the junior members' failures are your responsibility" by senior troupe members. Takarazuka Revue chairman Kenshi Koba announced at the press conference that he would step down from his role on 1 December, saying that the company did not sufficiently fulfill their duty of care for her safety. However they also stated instances of bullying or harassment could not be verified. On 23 February 2024 it was reported that Takarazuka Revue had admitted to evidence of power harassment to the deceased family's legal team. They are yet to come to a settlement.

Former Cosmos Troupe members reported a culture of harassment towards junior members including berating, forced apologies, physical abuse, and food, shower, and sleep deprivation. In February 2023 Shūkan Bunshun reported on the allegations of long-standing abusive practices and an allegation that the junior Cosmos Troupe member in question was intentionally burned on the forehead with a hair iron by a senior member. In response, Takarazuka executives had denied that any harassment took place and said that such allegations were hearsay.

== See also ==
- Films from Takarazuka Revue produced by Takarazuka Eiga
- Breeches role
- Cross-dressing
- Drag (clothing)
- Kabuki, a Japanese theatre tradition where male actors named Onnagata play female roles.

== Sources ==
- Robertson, Jennifer Ellen (1998). Takarazuka: Sexual Politics and Popular Culture in Modern Japan. Berkeley and Los Angeles, Calif.: University of California Press. p. 50. ISBN 0-520-21150-2.
- The Politics of Androgyny in Japan: Sexuality and Subversion in the Theater and Beyond Jennifer Robertson American Ethnologist, Vol. 19, No. 3 (Aug., 1992), pp. 419-442.
