= Rio Asumi =

Japanese actress (born 1985)

- 明日海 りお
- Born: 26 June 1985 (age 41); Shizuoka, Shizuoka, Japan
- Occupation: Actress
- Agent: Ken-On
- Height: 169 cm (5 ft 6 1/2 in)
- Website: https://www.ken-on.co.jp/asumi/

Rio Asumi (明日海 りお, Asumi Rio; born June 26, 1985) is a Japanese actress and former leading otokoyaku (男役, "male role") of Takarazuka Revue.

== Biography ==
Asumi Rio was born on June 26, 1985, in Shizuoka, Shizuoka, Japan. Asumi participated in many sports and arts growing up. She did swimming from the age of 1 until she was in elementary school, as well as ballet from the age of 3, and piano and calligraphy from the age of 4.

She entered a private middle school, where in her third year a ballet friend of hers lent her a video of a performance by the Moon Troupe of Takarazuka Revue. After watching it, she became obsessed with Takarazuka and begged her parents to let her take the entry exam for the Takarazuka Music School. Her parents initially wouldn't allow her to attempt the exam. She later locked herself in her room for 3 days and 3 nights, crying until she started running a fever. Eventually, her parents let her take the exam, and she passed on the first try.

== Career ==
Asumi joined Takarazuka Music School in 2001. She graduated and debuted in Takarazuka Revue in 2003 as part of the 89th class. She initially belonged to the Moon Troupe (Tsukigumi) as an otokoyaku (男役, male role), but she later transferred to Flower Troupe (Hanagumi), in 2013. She became the Top Star of Flower Troupe in 2014, where she stayed for 5 years up until her retirement from the company in 2019. Asumi Rio officially retired from Takarazuka on November 24, 2019, after being in the company for 16 years.

During her time with the revue, she performed in musicals including Elisabeth, in which she performed many times in many different roles, her most notable being that of the male lead, Death, which she performed in the 2009 shinko (newcomers performance), and again in 2014 as a Top Star. She also performed as the lead in other musicals such as Me and My Girl and the classic manga The Poe Clan in 2018.

Three months after her retirement from Takarazuka, it was revealed that she had signed with one of Japan's biggest talent agencies, Ken-On, and was opening a fan-club.

In May 2020, it was announced Asumi would be the voice actress for Mulan in the live-action movie. Towards the end of 2020, she appeared on the NHK morning drama Ochoyan for a period of time.

In January and February 2021, Asumi Rio reprised her role as Edgar Portsnell in a new staging of The Poe Clan. Asumi also was announced as the lead for the musical Mademoiselle Mozart in October 2021. She also made several TV appearances in 2021, including, Ao no SP, Konto ga Hajimaru, and was a Friday host for the month of June on the morning TV show ZIP!. In this same year, she also had an 8 episode hulu special called Asumi Rio's Atelier, where life-style topics such as cooking and interior decorating were explored by Asumi. In late November and early December 2021, Asumi hosted her first concert titled Asumic Lab.

In 2022, Asumi made a guest appearance on episodes 6 and 7 in the drama DCU. It was also announced that she would play Sarah Brown in the Toho production of the hit musical Guys & Dolls from June to July 2022. She also began a renewed season of her Hulu original show Asumi Rio's Atelier in November 2022, for 8 episodes.

== Filmography ==
=== TV drama ===
Year	Title	Role	Notes	Ref
2013	Take Five	Herself	Guest Role	
2020	Ochoyan	Takamine Ruriko	Support Role	
2021	Ao no SP	Ogawa Kaori	Support Role	
2021	Konto ga Hajimaru	Onda Mitsuyo	Support Role	
2022	DCU	Negishi Nayu	Guest Role	

=== Japanese dub ===
Year	Title	Role	Ref
2020	Mulan	Mulan	

== Musical works ==
=== Notable Takarazuka roles ===
==== Flower Troupe ====
- Sengoku Basara – Uesugi Kenshn
- The Love of the Last Tycoon – Pat Brady

===== As top star =====
- The Rose of Versailles – Fersen
- Elisabeth (2014) – Death
- Ernest in Love – Ernest (Jack Worthing)
- Me and My Girl (2016) – Bill Snibson
- Romanesque Mask – Victome de Valmont
- The Poe Clan – Edgar Portsnell

==== Moon Troupe ====
*= Switch casts

- Romeo & Juliette – Romeo, Tybalt*
- The Rose of Versailles – Oscar, Andre*
- Spring Snow – Matsugae Kiyokai
- The Scarlet Pimpernel – Chauvelin, Armand St. Just*
- Elisabeth (2009) – Stephan, Rudolf*
- Me and My Girl (2008) – Jaqueline Carstone

==== Newcomer performances ====
- Elisabeth (2009) – Death
- Me and My Girl (2009) – Bill Snibson

=== Post-Takarazuka roles ===
- The Poe Clan (2021) – Edgar Portsnell
- Mademoiselle Mozart (2021) – Wolfgang Amadeus Mozart (Eliza)
- Guys & Dolls (2022) – Sarah Brown
- War Paint (2023) – Elizabeth Arden
- 9 to 5 (2024) – Violet Newstead
- Musical Shōwa Genroku Rakugo Shinjū (2025) – Miyokichi
