= Takarazuka Grand Theater =

Theater in Takarazuka, Japan

- 宝塚大劇場
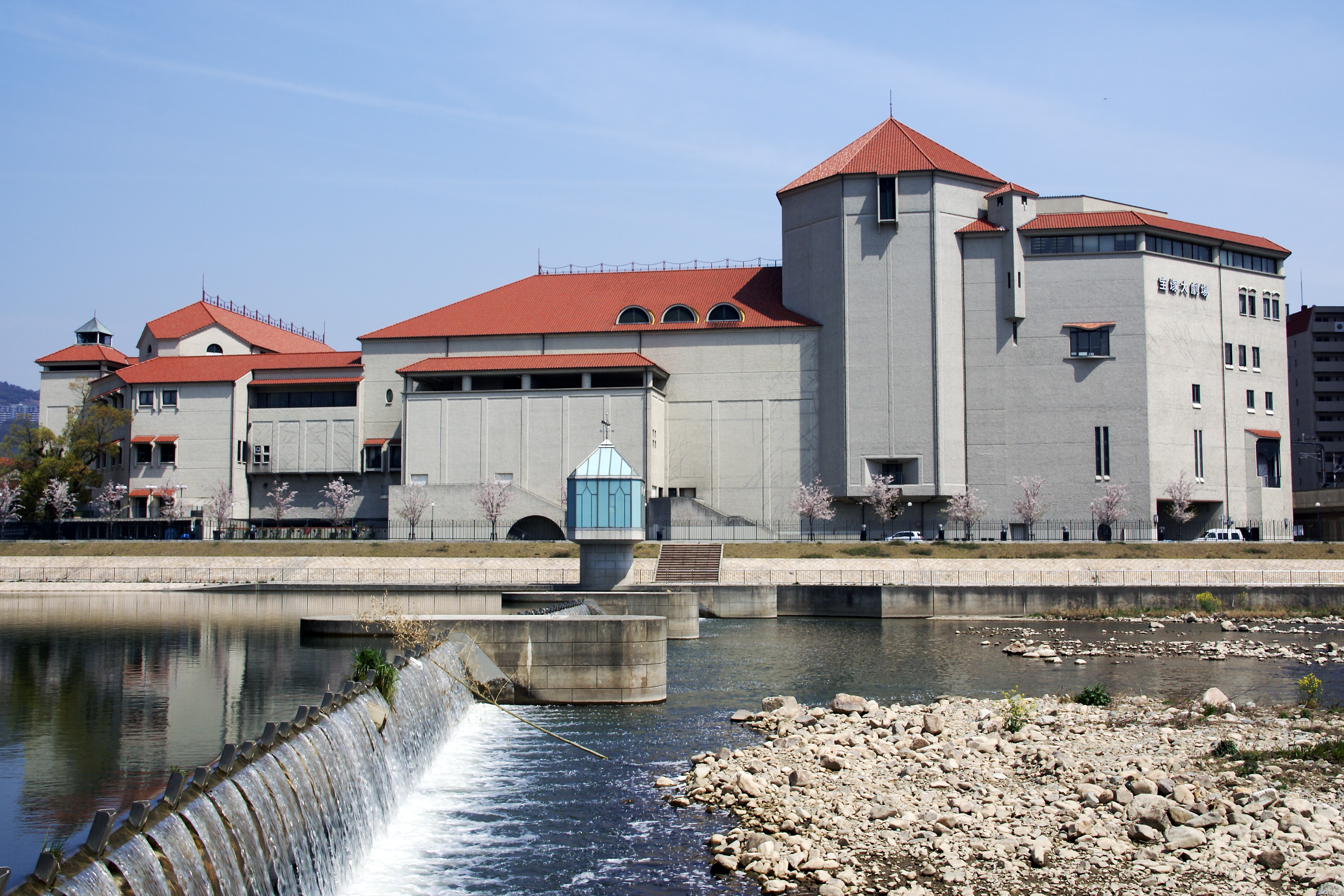
- The Takarazuka Grand Theater (right) and Bow Hall (left) on the banks of the Muko River
- Interactive map of Takarazuka Grand Theater
- Address: 1 Chome-1-57 Sakaemachi; Takarazuka, Hyōgo Prefecture; Japan
- Coordinates: 34°48′26″N 135°20′47″E
- Owner: Hankyu Corporation
- Operator: Takarazuka Stage Co., Ltd.
- Capacity: 2,550

Construction
- Opened: July 1924
- Rebuilt: January 1993

The Takarazuka Grand Theater (Japanese: 宝塚大劇場, Hepburn: Takarazuka Daigekijō) is a theater located in Takarazuka, Hyōgo, Japan. It is the home theater of the Takarazuka Revue, an all-female theater troupe established in 1913. The Grand Theater opened in 1924 and was rebuilt in 1993; the two iterations of the structure are occasionally distinguished as the "Old Takarazuka Grand Theater" (Kyū Takarazuka Daigekijō) and the "New Takarazuka Grand Theater" (Shin Takarazuka Daigekijō). The theater is adjacent to Takarazuka Bow Hall (宝塚バウホール, Takarazuka Bauhōru), a smaller theater also operated by the Takarazuka Revue.

== History ==
The Takarazuka Revue was founded by Ichizō Kobayashi in 1913 as an all-female troupe staging taishū engeki, a term for "popular" theater aimed at "ordinary people". Kobayashi was the founder of the railway company Hankyu, and chose the city of Takarazuka, Hyōgo to house the Revue and Grand Theater as it was located at the terminus of a Hankyu line to Osaka; the city was also already a popular tourist destination for its hot springs. Early Revue productions were staged at the Paradise Theater, a renovated indoor pool in Takarazuka that the Revue quickly outgrew. To accommodate a larger audience, Kobayashi conceived of the Grand Theater as an immense structure located in the suburbs that would contrast other theaters of the era, which were typically small, aimed at a discerning audience, and located in major cities.

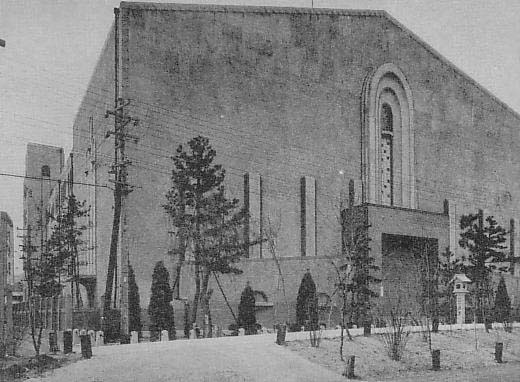
The Old Takarazuka Grand Theatre

The Takarazuka Grand Theater opened in July 1924. At the time of its establishment it was the largest theater in Asia; sources alternately report its audience capacity as between 3,000 and 4,200. The theater was designed by two architects from the Takenaka Corporation: Washio Kuro, who oversaw the design of the building (and who later designed the Tokyo Takarazuka Theater), and Fujii Yatarō, who oversaw the design of the stage and audience seating area. The theater featured modern amenities such as a revolving stage, hydraulic trap lifts, and lighting and sound systems, as well as restaurants, cafes, and souvenir stores. Its design, similar to that of a department store, has been cited as an example of Hanshinkan Modernism.

The Grand Theater was immediately popular, with its success leading to the establishment of the nearby Takarazuka Hotel in 1926, and the film production company Takarazuka Eiga in 1938. The majority of the theater's interior was destroyed by a fire on January 25, 1935, causing the theater to briefly close for renovations and re-open in March of that year. The technical equipment and interior design were regularly improved in the decades subsequent to the fire.

In 1944, the Grand Theater was forced to close amid the Second World War as a result of a government order that shuttered most leisure institutions. Tsubasa no Kessen, the final play staged at the Grand Theater prior to its closure, was performed for a standing-room only audience on March 4, 1944; in May of that year, the Imperial Japanese Navy took over the Grand Theater for use as a barracks. The Grand Theater was not significantly damaged during wartime air raids, as Allied forces instead targeted the area surrounding the theater with airborne leaflet propaganda reading "Do not worry, Takarazuka girls! We will not bomb you!" and "We will make Takarazuka flower again soon." The Grand Theater was occupied by American occupation forces upon the conclusion of the war in September 1945, and reopened to the public in April 1946.

By the 1980s the theater generally resembled its current incarnation, in terms of both its facilities and its European-style interior design defined by marble floors, red carpets, and crystal chandeliers. By the end of the decade, the growth of the Revue obligated the creation of a more modern and technically-efficient Grand Theater. The newly-constructed theater, which opened on January 1, 1993. incorporates multiple stages, dressing rooms, rehearsal rooms, offices, storage space, and the Takarazuka Music School. Its exterior white stucco and red tiled roof is inspired by Spanish Colonial architecture. On April 5, 2014, the centennial of the Takarazuka Revue was marked with a revue held at the Takarazuka Grand Theater. The Grand Theater closed in April 2020 as a result of the COVID-19 pandemic and re-opened in July of that year, at half capacity and with recorded music instead of a live orchestra.

== Venue information ==
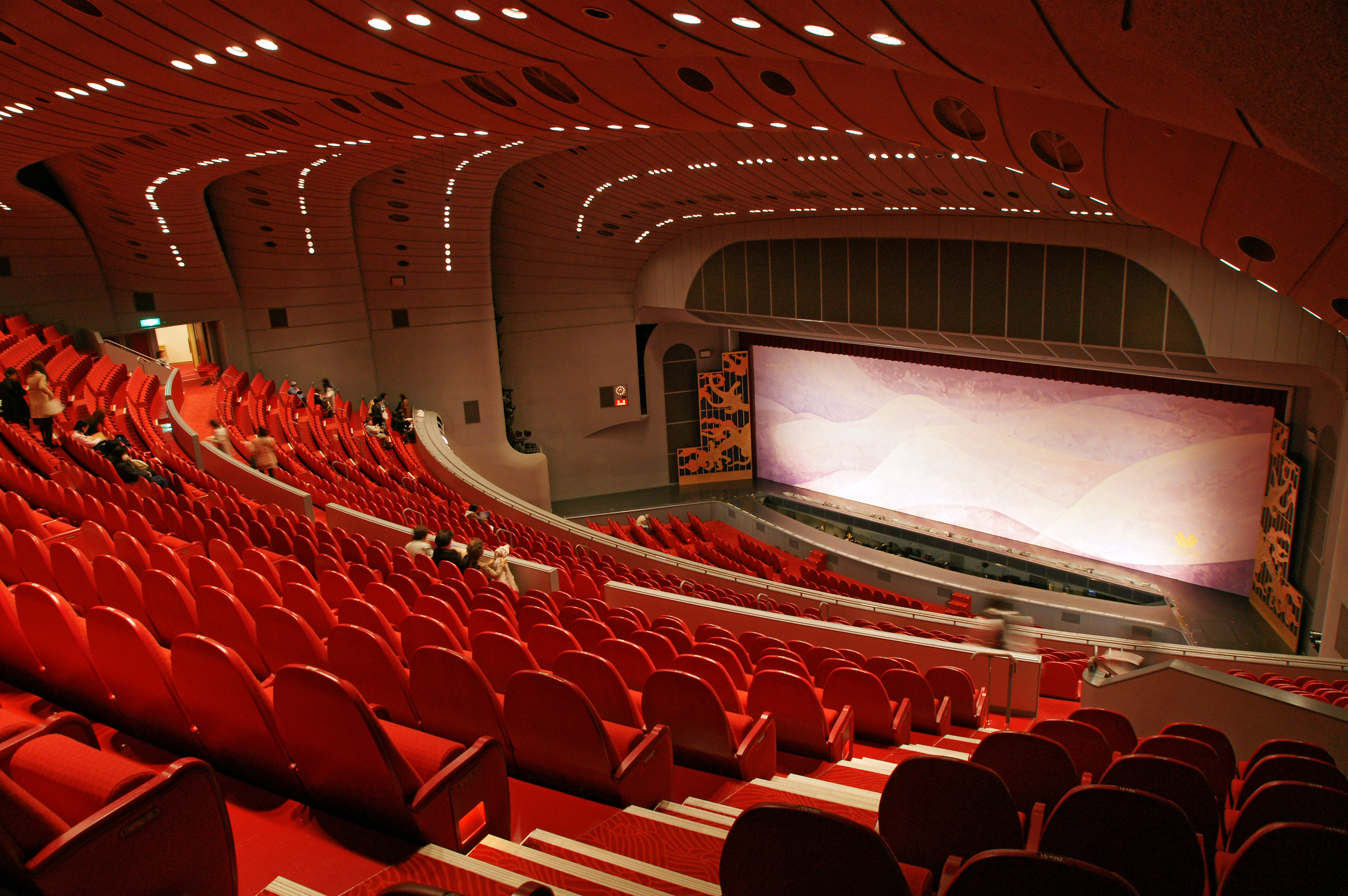
Interior of the Takarazuka Grand Theater

The New Takarazuka Grand Theater opened in 1993 as a two‐level, 2,527 seat venue. Twenty-three additional seats were added in 2005 following renovations to provide better stage visibility for the second level, bringing the total capacity of the theater to 2,550. The stage is 23.6 meters (77 ft) wide – 54 meters (177 ft) including the back stage – and 19 meters (62 ft) deep, and is equipped with eight trapdoors, 26 step stairs referred to as "The Great Stairs" (Ookaidan), three curtains, sixty decorative lights, seven floodlights, and a circular rotating stage that is 14.6 meters (48 ft) in diameter. The theater uses advanced acoustic technology, including a sound field control system that ensures equal acoustic quality for all seats in the venue, and a positional sound image control system that allows sound to be timed to the movement of the actresses. Acoustic tests performed by the Acoustical Society of America found the Grand Theater has a reverberation time of 1.1 seconds at 500 Hz, results deemed "very satisfactory".

In addition to its performance space, the Grand Theater houses multiple amenities. The second floor of the theater houses the Salon de Takarazuka, an exhibition space on the history of the Revue showcasing costumes, stage drawings, videos, and music. The Salon also houses the Revue's publicly-accessible multimedia archives, which house information on previous works, performers, and visual artifacts such as posters and advertisements. Located within the theater are five restaurants, which orient their menus to specific repertoires and include the favorite foods of Takarazuka performers. Several stores are also located within the Grand Theater, including the Revue Shop (which sells souvenirs) and Quatre Rêves (which sells Takarazuka memorabilia, such as photographs and catalogs).

Adjacent to the Grand Theater is Bow Hall, a smaller theater also operated by the Takarazuka Revue. Established in 1978, Bow Hall is a 500-seat theater that stages experimental works; the name references the bow of a ship, and was so named as to "lead the way" for the Revue's theatrical development. Bow Hall was conceived as a means to develop talent for directors, and stages several performances annually.

== Transportation access ==
The Takarazuka Grand Theater is served by Takarazuka Station, which connects to the Hankyu Takarazuka and Imazu lines, and the JR West Fukuchiyama Line.

== Gallery ==
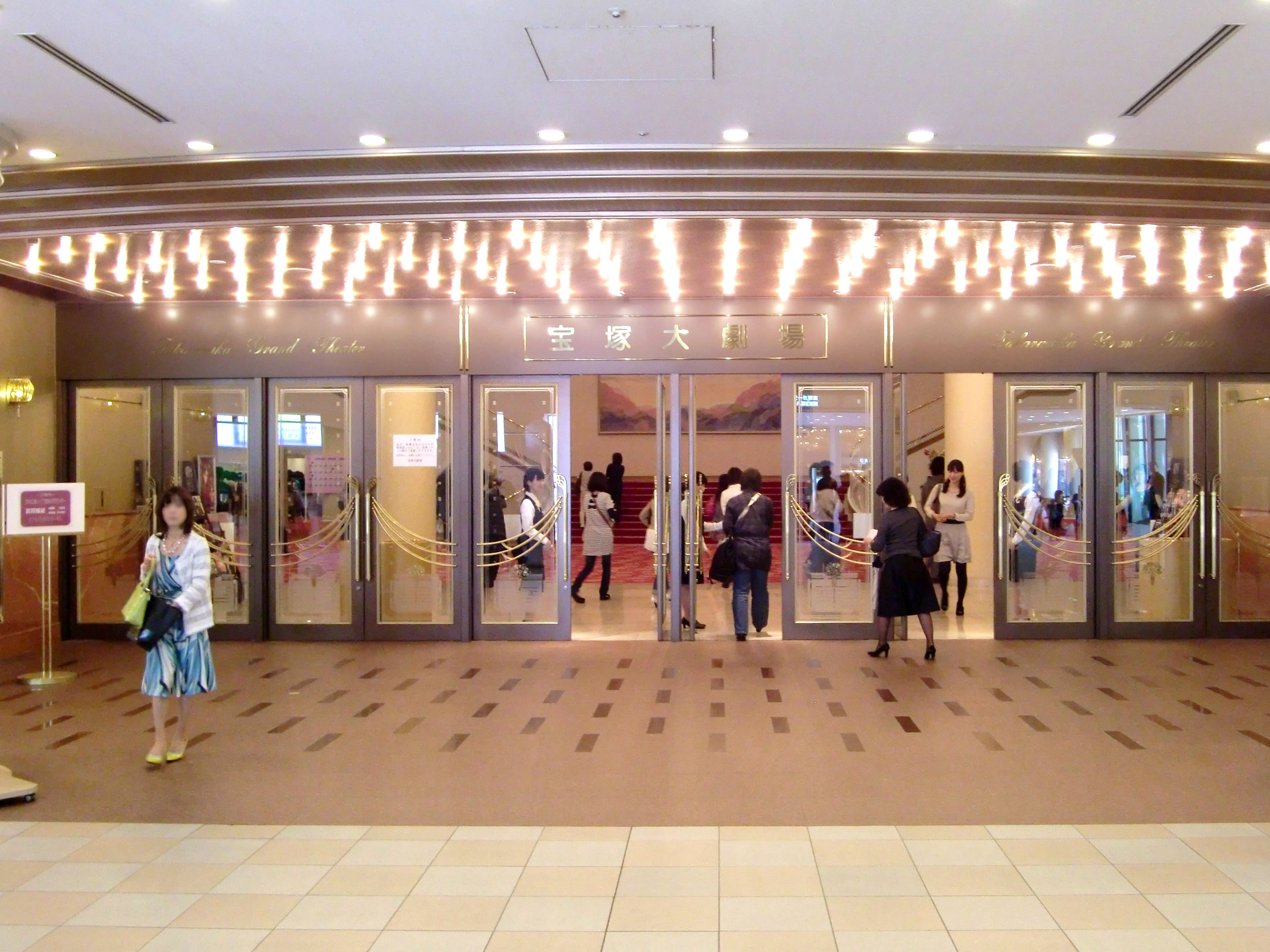
Entrance

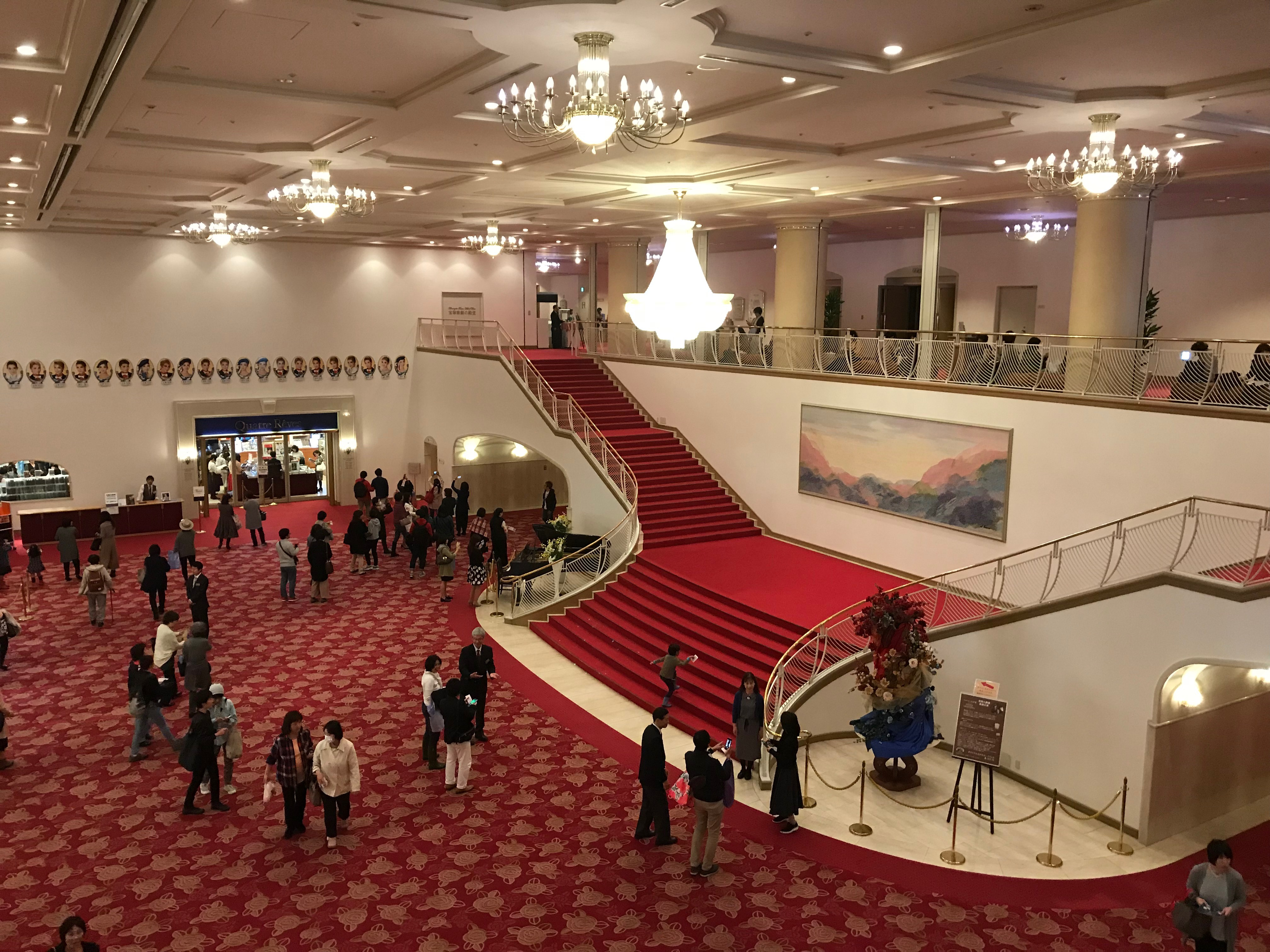
Lobby

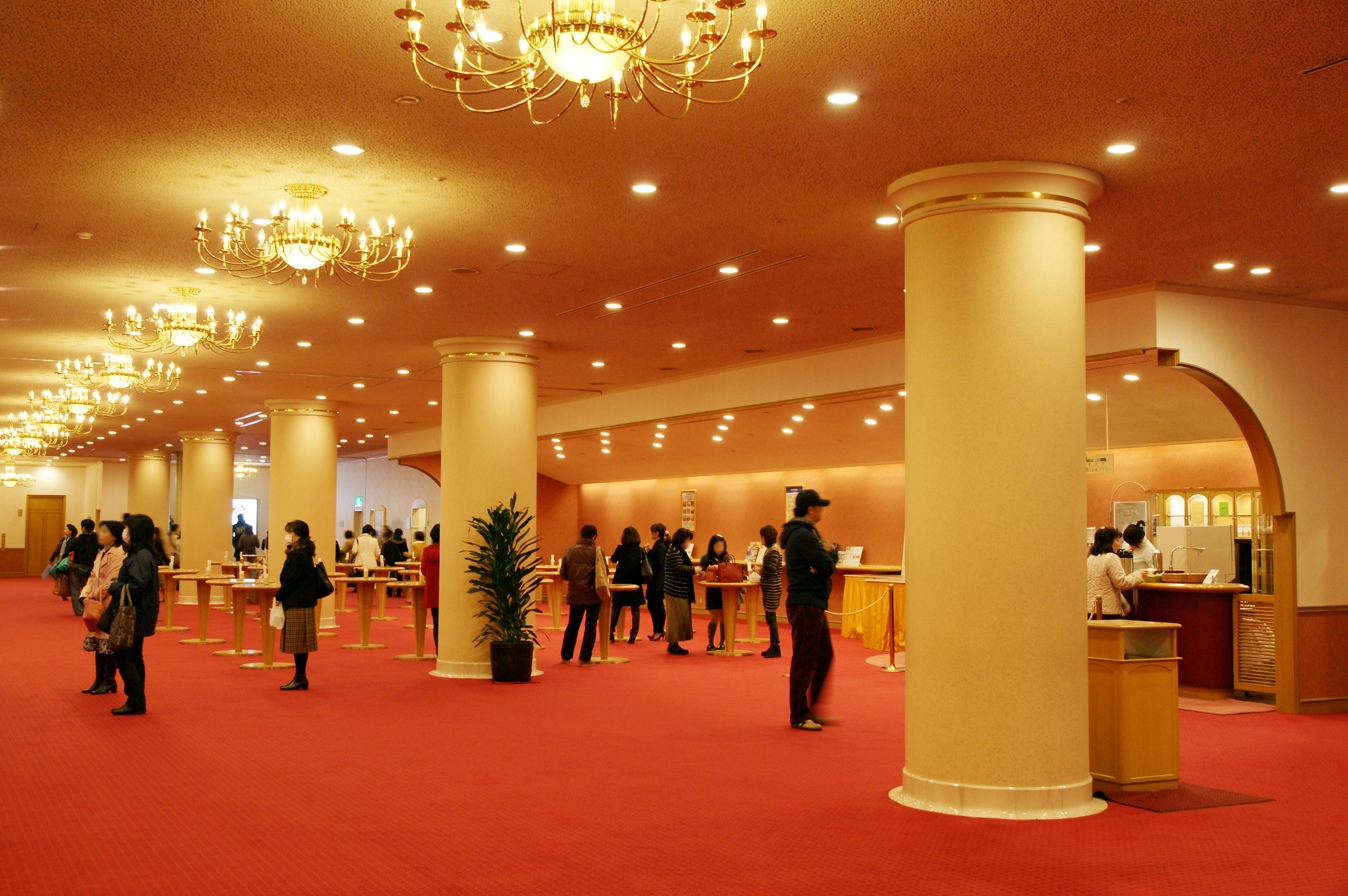
Lounge

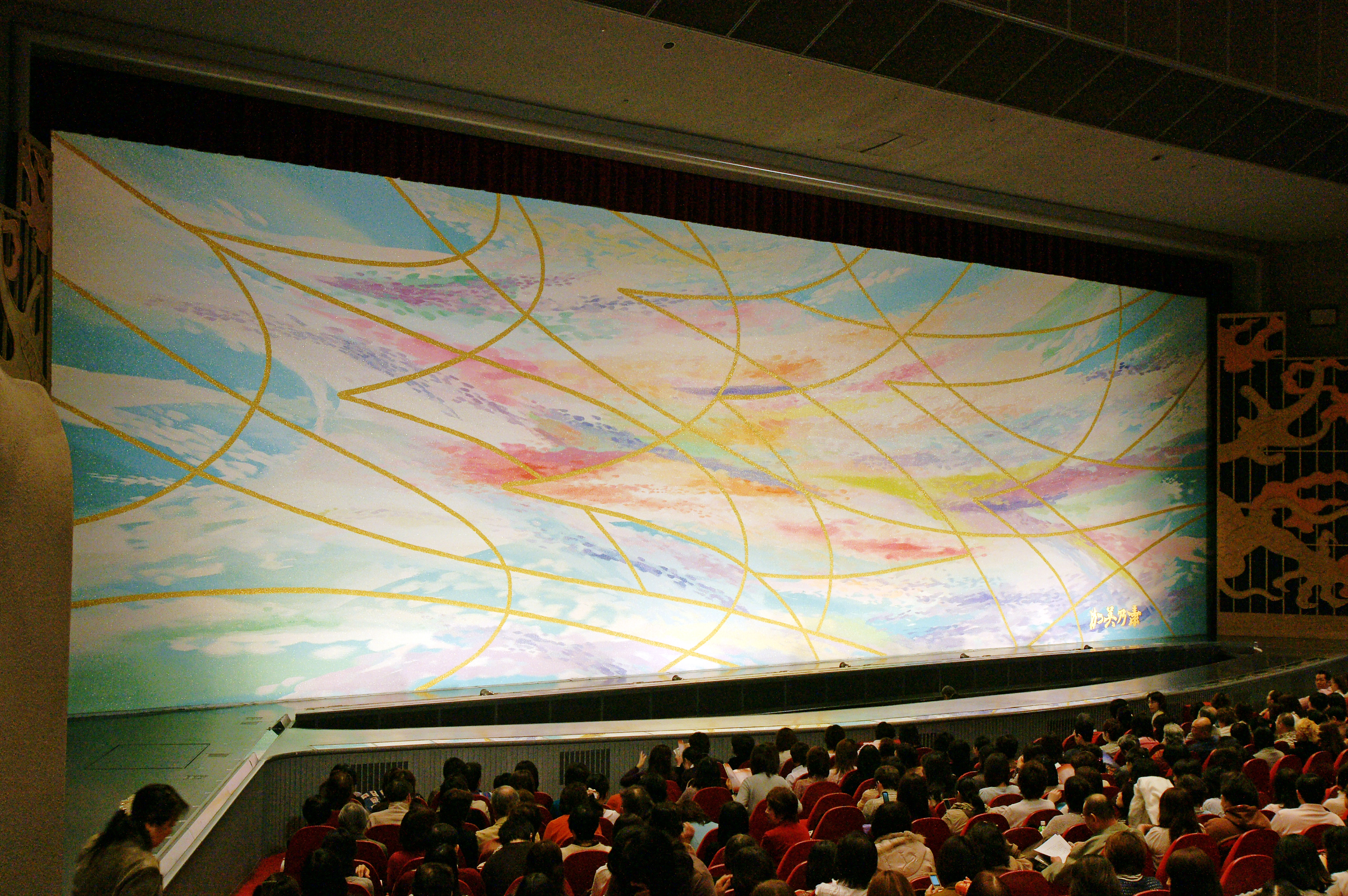
Stage
