= Takarazuka Music School =

- 宝塚音楽学校
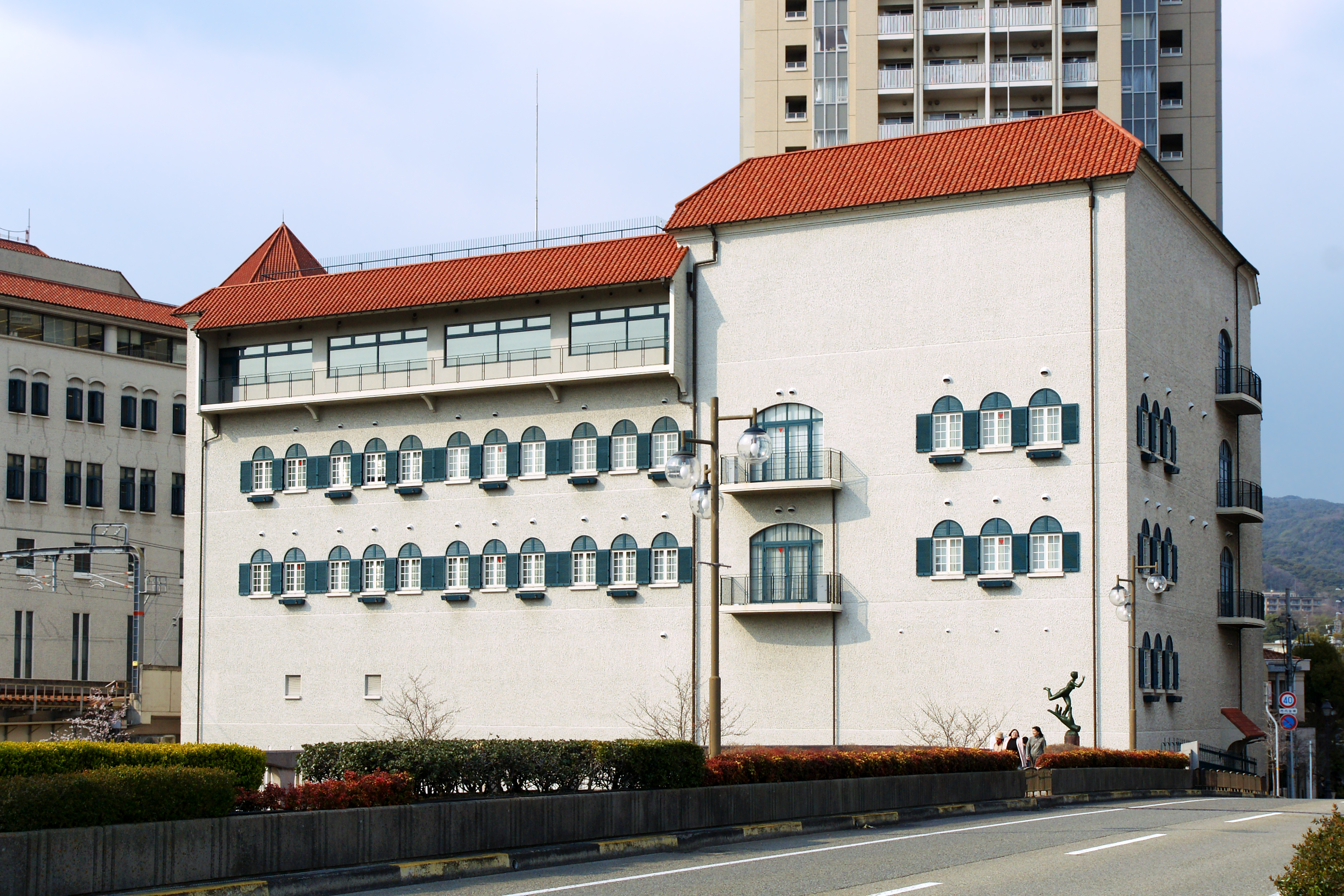
- Takarazuka Music School

Location
- Takarazuka, Hyōgo Prefecture, Japan
- Coordinates: 34.806583°N 135.347222°E

Information
- Type: Private
- Motto: Kiyoku, Tadashiku, Utsukushiku (Purely, Honestly and Gracefully)
- Established: 1913
- Founder: Ichizō Kobayashi
- Principal: Tatsuya Nakanishi
- Gender: Female only
- Age range: 15-18
- Enrollment: 40
- Website: http://www.tms.ac.jp/

Takarazuka Music School (宝塚音楽学校, Takarazuka Ongaku Gakkō) is a private girls' school in Takarazuka, Hyōgo Prefecture, Japan. It is a Takarazuka Revue training school that is a miscellaneous vocational school approved by Hyōgo Prefecture according to the School Education Law. The school was established in 1913 by Ichizō Kobayashi, the founder of the Hankyu Railway and the Takarazuka Revue.

The school is known for its strictness and unique set of rules that students must abide to both at school and during private life. During its over 100 years of history, it has produced over 4,500 performers for the Takarazuka stage.

== History ==
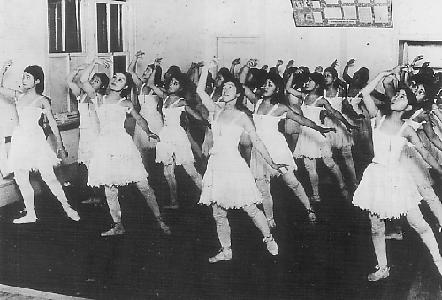
Dance lesson at Takarazuka Music School in 1919

Takarazuka Music School was established in July 1913 as Takarazuka Shōkatai (Takarazuka Chorus). In 1939, it was divided into the Takarazuka Revue and Takarazuka Music School. All Takarazuka Revue members have since been graduates of the Takarazuka Music School.

Since 1989, all students have received basic training at the Ground Self-Defense Force Camp Itami every year.

== Characteristics ==
=== Strictness ===
In the past, the strictness of the school was so famous that the school was called "Women's Military Academy". During the Shōwa period, a large number of students were enrolled compared to the present, but at the same time, a large number of failed students were issued. At the time, all students were sent home during the long summer vacation, and only the students who were notified at a later date proceeded to the second half of the school year. There are still some dropouts at the school, but some of them have returned to school or graduated after voluntarily dropping out.

=== Rules ===
The school has a two-year system, and the second graders are called "main course students" and the first graders are called "preparatory students", who must follow a unique set of rules when making contact with their seniors.

The preparatory students must:

- bow at all Hankyu trains and wait for the train to pass by, as their seniors could be on board
- commute to school in a two-row formation
- greet the distant seniors loudly
- answer only either "yes" or "no" to the seniors
- make a "preparatory face" in front of their seniors, that includes wrinkling between the eyebrows and lowering the corners of the mouth
- turn at a 90 degree angle when making a turn in the school hallways
- walk in a straight row along the wall in the school hallways
- stop the microwave oven before the bell rings in the school dormitory
- not make any sound while walking up the stairs
- board the backmost car of a Hankyu train and not take a seat
- all walk in rain without an umbrella if a single student forgets to bring an umbrella
- all voluntarily declare a violation made by another preparatory student and apologize together to the seniors.

All rules are created by students themselves, and students review and discuss the rules with the school every year. The rules reflect the school spirit based on the school motto "Purely, correctly, beautifully". Regarding the strict rules, the students have explained that, "As a student at Takarazuka Music School, one must take actions that are not embarrassing."

The mysterious tradition of rules unique to Takarazuka Music School has attracted a lot of attention. There are about 50 fanclubs dedicated to the school's tradition, and it is a common sight to see dozens of people waiting for students to pass by near the Takarazuka Theater.

However, since harassment has become a serious issue, in 2020, the school made a statement saying that outdated rules would be abolished over time.

=== School uniform ===
The school uniform is a gray uniform with a school emblem with the name "TMS" (abbreviation of Takarazuka Music School) on the chest, a red ribbon tie, and white tri-fold socks. The current design was created in 1956.

Preparatory students in the male role wear a pompadour hairstyle, and students in the female role wear braided pigtails that are tightly woven to the ends of the hair. The shoes are black loafers for preparatory students and black pumps for college students. The wristwatches have a black leather belt.

== Enrollment ==
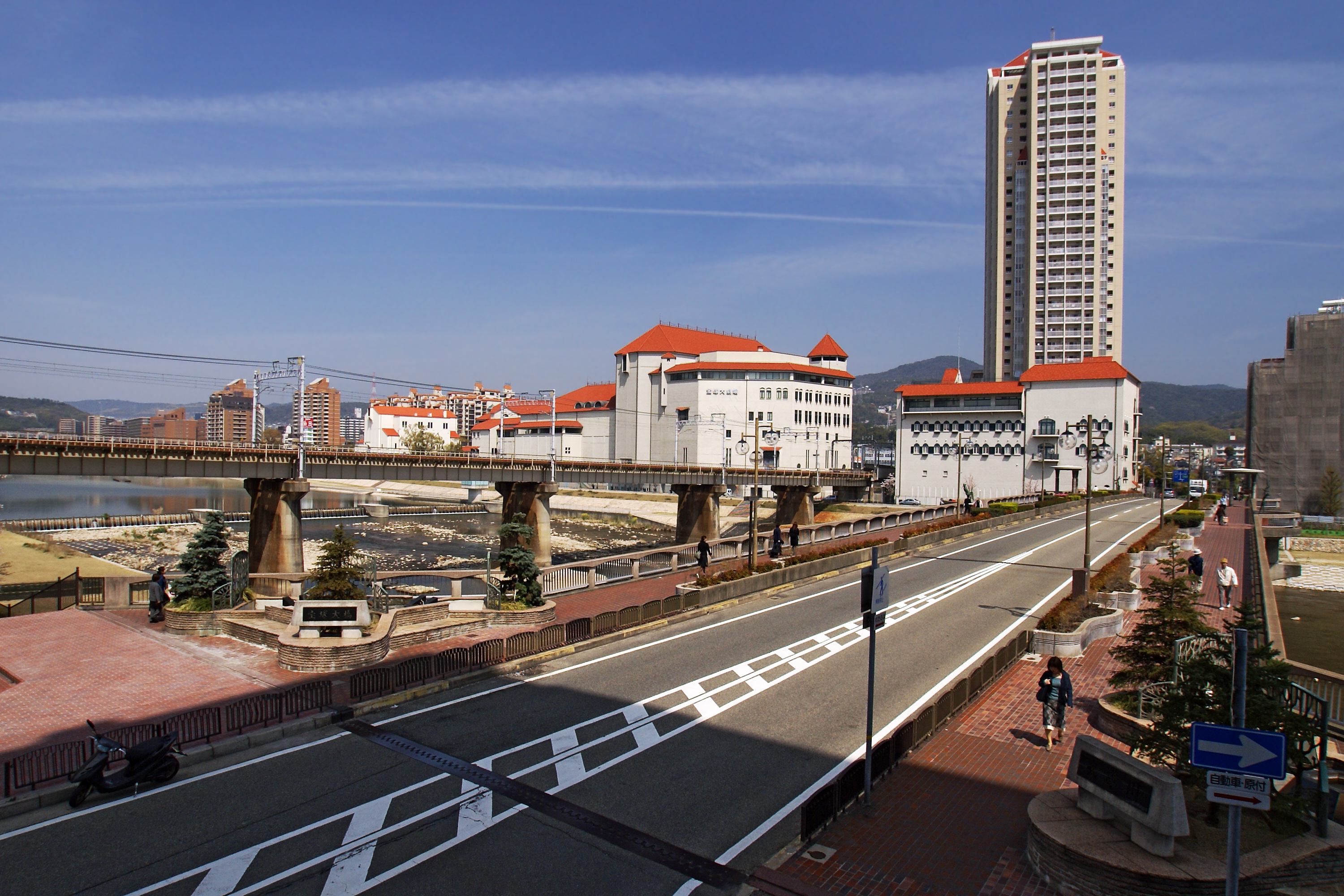
The school building by the Muko River. Next to the left is the Takarazuka Grand Theater.

Since 2000, the maximum number of students was 50, but the number of successful applicants since 2008 has been about 40. The entrance examination is held at the end of March every year.

The number of examinees in 2016 was 1,079, with 40 successful applicants. The competition was 27.0 times higher than that of other schools.

=== Qualification requirements ===
- Having a graceful appearance and being suitable for the stage of the Takarazuka Revue
- A girl aged between 15 and 18 years old
- A maximum of 4 chances to take the exam are allowed
