= The Rose of Versailles musicals =

Japanese manga dramatization

The Rose of Versailles has been dramatized for Takarazuka Revue by Shinji Ueda. The show's role in Takarazuka history is particularly notable as it established the "Top Star" system that remains in place to this day. Rose of Versailles also triggered a large surge in the revue's popularity, commonly referred to as the "BeruBara Boom" (ベルバラブーム, Berubara Buumu).

The musicals have either played up the importance of the Oscar-Andre relationship, or the Fersen-Marie Antoinette relationship. Shinji Ueda, a Takarazuka producer, asked Riyoko Ikeda to write new stories with scenes from the manga never before seen on stage and by placing a focus on minor characters. In 2008 and 2009, four new musicals were staged based on the minor characters Girodelle, Alain de Soissons, and Bernard Chatelet, as well as André Grandier.

== Takarazuka stage adaptations ==
- The Rose of Versailles - The plot of this original performance is said to be the closest to Ikeda's manga

1974, Moon Troupe, top bill: Yuri Haruna, Asou Kaoru

- The Rose of Versailles: Andre and Oscar - The plot focuses on the relationship between Oscar and Andre. The show went through several revisions over the course of the years. In later versions, Oscar is typically the lead role. However, in earlier versions, the show is often considered to have a double lead.

1975, Flower Troupe, top bill: Jun Anna, Yuri Haruna

1975, Snow Troupe, top bill: Natsuko Migiwa, Rei Asami

1976, Flower Troupe, National tour, top bill:

1979, Flower Troupe, National tour, top bill: Akira Matsu

1980, Snow Troupe, National tour, top bill: Natsuko Migiwa

- The Rose of Versailles III - The plot focuses on the relationship between Hans Axel Von Fersen and Marie Antoinette. The Takarazuka run featured guest stars from other troupes performing in the role of Oscar. The show underwent a quick partial rewrite for the Moon Troupe performance, placing more emphasis on Fersen.

1976, Star Troupe (Takarazuka version), top bill: Ran Ōtori

1976, Moon Troupe (Tokyo version), top bill: Ran Ōtori

- Fantasy The Rose of Versailles - A shortened version of the Takarazuka version of Andre and Oscar

1977, Flower Troupe, National Tour, top bill: Jun Anna

- Takarazuka Fantasy The Rose of Versailles - A shortened and revised version of Andre and Oscar

1978, Snow Troupe, National Tour, top bill: Natsuko Migiwa

- The Rose of Versailles: Andre and Oscar - The plot focuses on the relationship between Oscar and Andre. Andre is given the lead role.

1989, Snow Troupe, top bill: Keaki Mori, Ichiro Maki

- The Rose of Versailles: Fersen and Marie Antoinette - The plot focuses on the relationship between Fersen and Marie Antoinette. Fersen is given the lead role.

1989, Star Troupe, top bill: Kaoru Hyuuga

2001, Cosmos Troupe, top bill: Yōka Wao

2006, Star Troupe, top bill: Wataru Kozuki

- The Rose of Versailles: Fersen - A variation of Fersen and Marie Antoinette. Fersen is given the lead role.

1990, Flower Troupe, top bill: Mizuki Ōura

1991, Flower Troupe, Ueda, top bill: Mizuki Ōura

- The Rose of Versailles: Oscar, Andre

1991, Snow Troupe, National Tour, top bill: Keaki Mori

- The Rose of Versailles: Oscar - The plot focuses on Oscar, her love with Andre and her tragic end.

1991, Moon Troupe, top bill: Mayo Suzukaze

- The Rose of Versailles: Oscar and Andre - The plot focuses on the relationship between Oscar and Andre. Oscar is given the lead role.

2001, Star Troupe, top bill: Kō Minoru

- The Rose of Versailles - An abbreviated variation of Fersen and Marie Antoinette adapted specifically for the Takarazuka performances in Seoul, South Korea.

2005, Star Troupe, Korean Tour, top bill: Wataru Kozuki

2006, Snow Troupe, top bill: Hikaru Asami

2006, Snow Troupe, National Tour, top bill: Natsuki Mizu

- Gaiden - The Rose of Versailles: Girodelle - Focusing on Girodelle's love interest with Sophie, Fersen's younger sister.

2008, Snow Troupe, top bill: Natsuki Mizu

- Gaiden - The Rose of Versailles: Alain - Focusing on Alain, his unrequited love for Oscar and his relationship with his younger sister Dianne

2008, Flower Troupe, top bill: Sei Matobu

- Gaiden - The Rose of Versailles: Bernard - Focusing on Bernard and his love for Rosalie.

2008, Star Troupe, top bill: Kei Aran

- Gaiden - The Rose of Versailles: Andre - Focusing on Andre's childhood and a girl he knew before he fell in love with Oscar.

2009, Cosmos Troupe, top bill: Yūga Yamato

2009, Flower Troupe, top bill: Sei Matobu

- The Rose of Versailles: Oscar and Andre - The plot focuses on the relationship between Oscar and Andre. Oscar is given the lead role.

2013，Moon Troupe, top bill: Masaki Ryuu, Rio Asumi

- The Rose of Versailles: Fersen - A variation of Fersen and Marie Antoinette. Fersen is given the lead role.

2013, Snow Troupe, top bill: Kazuho Sou

- The Rose of Versailles: Oscar and Andre - The plot focuses on the relationship between Oscar and Andre. Oscar is given the lead role.

2014, Cosmos Troupe, top bill: Kaname Ouki

- The Rose of Versailles: Fersen - A variation of Fersen and Marie Antoinette. Fersen is given the lead role.

2014, Cosmos Troupe, National Tour, top bill: Manato Asaka

2014, Flower Troupe, top bill: Rio Asumi

2015, Flower Troupe, top bill: Rio Asumi

2024, Snow Troupe, top bill: Sakina Ayakaze

== Korean musical adaptation ==
Development for the musical in South Korea was announced in December 2022. The musical company, EMK, has experience creating a rococo stage in the past by producing a revised version of the musical Marie Antoinette. It was first presented as a preview gala concert on December 2–3, 2023, and then premiere at the Chungmu Arts Center Grand Theater in July 2024. In 2024, Riyoko Ikeda, the original author of The Rose of Versailles, visited South Korea ahead of that musical's premiere.

It received positive reviews from critics for its cast and visual spectacle of set design but was criticized for the score and especially the story was criticized for trying to cram 10 volumes of the manga into a two-and-a-half hour musical.

=== Casts ===
Role	Actors/Actresses
Oscar François de Jarjayes	Ock Joo-hyun, Kim Ji-woo, Jung Yoo-ji
André Grandier	Lee Hae-jun, Kim Sung-sik, Ko Eun-sung
Bernard Châtelet	Park Min-sung, Seo Yeong-taek, Noh Yun
Florian Victor Clement de Gerodelle	Song Jae-rim, Sung Yeon
Rosalie La morlière	Yoo So-ri, Jang Hye-rin
Duchesse de Polignac	Seo Ji-young, Lisa, Park Hye-mi
General de Jarjayes	Lee Woo-seung
Henry Salvatore de Gemene	Seo Seung-won
Nourricier	Lim Eun-yeong, Kim Myeong-hee
Charlotte de Polignac	Yoo Seung-yeon, Nam Seo-eun
Louis XVI	Jeong Won-sik
Marie Antoinette	Park Yu-jin → Park So-eun
Hans Axel von Fersen	Shin Dong-woo
Ensemble	Gong Min-seop, Jeong Won-il, Lee Eun-ju, Je Byeong-jin, Jeon Seon-jin, Kim Kang-heon, Jang Yeo-jin, Lee Seul-gi, Lee Geon-min, Kim Ri-an, Jeon Gi-su, Ahn Jun-hyeok, Jeong Won-sik, Hyun Seong-ho, Park Seong-jin, Baek Chan-hyeok, Seong Yoo-seung, Park Jun-byeong, Jeong Se-hoon, Choi Yoon-jae, Jang Jun-woo, Park So-eun, Shin Dong-woo, Jo Yu-jin, Park Yu-jin

* Note: Most, if not all, large scale South Korean Musicals are generally double or triple cast for a role. The actors share the role equally and alternate throughout the eight show week.
