= Tomu Ranju =

Japanese actress/singer

- 蘭寿 とむ
- Born: Mayu Sakamoto (阪本 真由); 12 August 1975 (age 51); Nishinomiya, Hyogo
- Years active: 1996–present
- Height: 5 ft 7 in (170 cm)
- Website: tomu-ranju.jp ameblo.jp/ranjunokai/

Mayu Sakamoto (Japanese: 阪本 真由, Hepburn: Sakamoto Mayu; born 12 August 1975), known professionally as Tomu Ranju (蘭寿 とむ, Ranju Tomu) is a Japanese singer, TV and musical actress most widely recognized as Takarazuka Revue Flower Troupe's otokoyaku (男役 Takarazuka actresses who play male roles) top star from 2011 to 2014. Ranju is considered one of the triple threat actresses the revue has had in recent years and was selected to record songs for many of Takazuka albums, both while she was with the revue and after she left.

After her "graduation" (Takarazuka actresses may not rejoin the revue after they leave), Ranju began to actively pursue a career on stage, focusing mainly on musicals. She could also be seen on television, playing supporting roles and as TV show hosts.

In 2016, Ranju got married and became inactive ever since.

== Early life ==
Tomu Ranju was born Mayu Sakamoto (阪本真由) in Nishinomiya, Hyogo, a city in the same prefecture as the city where the Takarazuka Revue is based and got its name from.

Sakamoto started to take ballet classes at the invitation of her friends while she was in elementary school, and has been dancing ever since. In eighth grade, she heard about the revue for the first time and became interested. On her off days, she would take morning trains to Takarazuka to line up for same-day tickets for shows. She was particularly fascinated by Mizuki Oura's performances - who was famous for her dance skills, and also a Flower Troupe otokoyaku top star.

Sakamoto continued to go to Takarazuka performances, but it was not until she was in high school that she decided to try out for the extremely competitive entrance exam of the Takarazuka Music School, known for low acceptance percentage.

In 1994, a year for record low acceptance percentage of only 2%, Sakamoto was admitted to the Takarazuka Music School with the highest score. Throughout her 2 years at the music school and first 7 years with the Takarazuka Revue, she maintained the status as No. 1 student (all Takarazuka actresses come from the musical school and are considered "students" until they leave the revue).

== Takarazuka Revue Career ==
In 1996 Sakamoto graduated at the top of her class, and successfully joined the revue. By tradition, Takarazuka students would have already decided on her stage name (subject to revue approval), and switch to be addressed by it now. Sakamoto began to be billed as Tomu Ranju. The stage name was suggested by her teacher and family. The first name "tomu" was going to be written in kanji as "人夢", which means giving people dreams; but the kanji was considered too complicated and changed to Hiragana form "とむ". The last name "蘭寿" is the kanji form of "l'ange", French for "angel". Following Takarazuka customs, she also has a couple of nicknames (given by fellow Takarazuka actresses and fans): Tomu (とむ), Mayu (まゆ), Rantomu (らんとむ).

Ranju debuted in Can-Can, and was then assigned to Flower Troupe. During the early years of her career, in addition to appearing in minor roles in regular revue productions, she was also cast for minor roles in novice productions and dinner shows.

In 2001 she began to be cast for lead roles in novice productions. In 2002, she won her first lead role in the revue's Bow Hall production of Tsuki no Hokage, sharing the lead role Jiroukichi with Ayabuki Mao. In the same year, Ranju won the Takarazuka Revue's Newcomer of the Year award.

In 2005 Ranju won the revue's Best Effort of the Year award. In 2006, she had her own first dinner show Sensation!, an indication that she now has enough fans to fill events with herself at top billing. In the same year, she was reassigned to Cosmos Troupe. In 2007, as Yūga Yamato was promoted to Cosmos top star, Ranju was promoted to the second lead.

In February 2009, Ranju was cast in the lead role for another Bow Hall production Gyakuten Saiban: Yomigaeru Shinjitsu (逆転裁判 -蘇る真実-), based on the Capcom legal thriller video game Ace Attorney. The production was very well-received, the revue presented a sequel, Gyakuten Saiban 2: Yomigaeru Shinjitsu, Futatabi... (逆転裁判2 -蘇る真実、再び…-) just six months later. These 2 productions greatly boosted and attested to Ranju's popularity, leading to her first Takarazuka concert "R"ising!! in 2010.

In 2011, as Sei Matobu left the revue, Ranju was re-assigned back to Flower Troupe as the next otokoyaku top star, her debut production was the Takarazuka version of Phantom.

During her 3 years as the top star, it was considered that Ranju did well to carry on the tradition of Flower Troupe as "treasury of otokoyaku" and "Flower Troupe of Dance". Her partnership with top musumeyaku Hana Ranno was popular too, earning them the nick name "orchid couple" (both of their stage names have the kanji orchid 蘭).

On October 8, 2013, Ranju announced in a press conference that she will be quitting the revue. Her farewell production was The Love of the Last Tycoon / Takarazuka Dazzling Dreams, a musical/show based on The Last Tycoon by F. Scott Fitzgerald. On May 11, 2014, after the last performance of The Love of the Last Tycoon / Takarazuka Dazzling Dreams, Tomu Ranju officially left the Takarazueka Revue and became an "OG" (old girls, referring to Takarazuka actress who's left the revue).

== Career After Takarazuka Revue ==
Like most graduated Takarazuka actresses, Ranju chose to continue on with her career using her Takarazuka stage name.

Ranju's post-Takarazuka activities are focused on musical, dinner shows and concerts, but there are also television drama supporting roles and variety show appearances . Her relationship with Takarazuka Revue remains close, and was chosen to participate in 2 of its centennial celebration events: recording Reijin, an album with other otokoyaku OGs; and singing in the celebration concert of the post-mortem 90th birthday of Fubuki Koshiji, a Takarazuka OG from the 1940s with legendary stature in Japanese entertainment history.

=== Theater ===
Ranju's first non-Takarazuka appearance is the musical "ifi", a show focuses on showcasing various dance styles. She had a busy 2015 - 2016, balancing 2 stage productions while participating in various Takarazuka 100th anniversary special performances, leading roles in "The Love Bugs" and "Sister Act".

=== TV ===
As one of the "Sentinel Tops" (the 5 troupe otokoyaku tops), Ranju made numerous TV talk show and variety show appearances. She also did some narrating jobs for Sky Stage (Takarazuka's own TV channel) programs.

Ranju's first TV drama appearance was a supporting role in Netflix's first Japanese production Atelier, playing an influential Vouge-ish magazine editor. She will next be seen in It's Not that I Can't Get Married, But I Don't Want To (this TV drama has no official English title), a TV drama about why successful and beautiful women prefer to stay single. Ranju plays one of the female lead character's friends, a successful financial adviser who's over 40, happily single, and has a younger boyfriend.

In March 2016, Ranju co-hosted a pilot for "Takarazuka Dream Tours" with veteran entertainment show host Shinsuke Kasai, a well-known avid Takarazuka fan. The pilot was picked up by Fuji Television, and in June it became a monthly show. The show is shot 100% on location, interviewing the special guest while doing activities she has always wanted to try but have not had the chance. All special guests are Takarazuka OGs, many top star OGs have appeared in the show, including Ranju's top musumeyaku (娘役, Takarazuka actresses who play female roles) Ranno Hana, former Moon Troupe top star Jun Sena, Ranju's predecessor Flower Troupe top star Sei Matobu, former Snow Troupe top stars Kazuho So and Natsuki Mizu.

In 2016, Ranju announced that she is getting married and will be taking a break from acting. Her public appearance slowly became few and does not involve performance anymore, such as attending the premiere of Ocean's 8 in Japan (as she played Danny Ocean in Takarazuka's musical version of Ocean's 11), as special guests for Takarzuka's TV channel Sky Stage talk shows, as special talk session guests when recordings of her Takarazuka performances are broadcast on TV channels such as WOWOW and Historical Drama Channel (a Japanese TV channel that specializes broadcasting in historical productions).

== Personal life ==
Ranju does not share much info about her private life and is not known to be social-media savvy like other Takarazuka OGs. Her blog on Ameba is the only official social media platform accessible by the public, and is maintained by only herself.

On September 28, 2016, Ranju posted a blog announcing that she has just submitted her marriage registration. Initially, no information was available on her husband. But in 2017, with the announcement that Shuzo Matsuoka's eldest daughter being accepted to enter Takarazuka Music School, it was revealed that Ranju's husband is a cousin-by-marriage to Shuzo Matsuoka - making her a member of the Kobayashi family that founded Takarazuka Revue (Shuzo Matsuoka is a direct decedent of Ichizō Kobayashi)

== Takarazuka Revue ==
Flower Troupe 1996 - 2006

- 1996: Can-Can/Nightless Castle in Manhattan
- 1996: How to Succeed
- 1996: How to Succeed, as Coffee Boy & Tackaberry (Novice Production)
- 1996-97: Hong Kong Nocturne (Bow Hall)
- 1997: Hollywood Babylon/Southern Cross Revue
- 1997: Hollywood Babylon, as Mike Taylor (Novice Production)
- 1997: The Labyrinth of Loving You! (Bow Hall)
- 1997: That's Revue
- 1997: That's Revue, Fukuoka (Novice Production)
- 1997: Blue Swan (Bow Hall and Nippon Seinenkan)
- 1997 - 98: Pale Dawn (Bow Hall and Nippon Seinenkan), as Ryuu
- 1998: That's Revue (Chunichi), as Shizuoka
- 1998: Speakeasy/Sniper
- 1998: Endless Love (Bow Hall), as Alif
- 1998: Speakeasy/Sniper, as Frederick
- 1998: Speakeasy, as Charles Randy (Novice Production)
- 1998: Miki in Budokan (Maya Miki Concert)
- 1999: Dawn Overture
- 1999: Dawn Overture, as Kushibiki Yumindo and Rickshaw Man (Novice Production)
- 1999: Endless Love (Nippon Seinenkan), as Alif
- 1999: Tango Argentino/The Revue '99, as Alan
- 1999: Tango Argentino, as Jean (Novice Production)
- 1999: LA GARE (Aika Mire Dinner Show)
- 1999: Third Takarazuka Kyougen Club
- 1999: TCA Special 1999 - Hello! Wonderful Time
- 2000: Tango Argentino/The Revue IV (Chunichi), as Otto
- 2000: Lived in a Dream/The Beauties!, as Koremitsu
- 2000: Lived in a Dream, as Time Spirit (Novice Production)
- 2000: Takarazuka: Snow, Moon, Flower/Sunrise Takarazuka (Berlin Tour)
- 2000: LOVE BEAT (Iori Naoka Dinner Show)
- 2000: TCA Special 2000 - King of Revue
- 2000 - 01: Ludwig II/Asian Sunrise, as Eckeert
- 2000 - 01: Ludwig II/Asian Sunrise, as Journalist
- 2000 - 01: Ludwig II, as Bernhard von Gudden (Novice Production)
- 2001: Michelangelo/Viva!, as Niccoro
- 2001: Michelangelo, as Michelangelo (Novice Production lead role)
- 2001: Manon (Bow Hall and Nippon Seinenkan), as Lescaut
- 2001: VIRTUAL GUY! (Sena Jun Dinner Show)
- 2001: Felicita Arcobaleno (Aika Mire Dinner Show)
- 2001: TCA Special 2001 - Takarazuka Dream Century
- 2001 - 02: Canary (Drama City), as Dijon
- 2002: In the Amber-Hued Rain/Cocktail, as Roland and Pierre
- 2002: In the Amber-Hued Rain, as Claude de Bernard (Novice Production lead role)
- 2002: Gone with the Wind (Nissay), as Rene Picard
- 2002: Tsuki no Hokage (Bow Hall and Nippon Seinenkan), as Jiroukichi (double lead with Ayabuki Mao)
- 2002 - 03: Elisabeth: The Rondo of Love and Death, as Elemer
- 2002 - 03: Elisabeth: The Rondo of Love and Death, as Der Tod (Novice Production lead role)
- 2003: Love Goblin (Bow Hall), as Yata (lead role)
- 2003: A Flute Named Wind/A Revue is Born, as Shiranui
- 2003: In the Amber-Hued Rain/Cocktail, as Louis Valentin (National Tour)
- 2003: TCA Special 2003 - Dear Grand Theater
- 2003: Paris Festival 2003
- 2004: Endless Flight/Season of Angels/Applause Takarazuka!, as George
- 2004: Javan Dancer, as Haji Tamran (National Tour)
- 2004: La Esperanza/Takarazuka's Dancing Dreams, as Tom
- 2004: TCA Special 2004 - Takarazuka 90
- 2004: The Rose of Versailles 30
- 2005: Kurawanka (Bow Hall), as Hachigorou (lead role)
- 2005: Marrakesh: A Crimson Tombstone/Enter the Revue, as Gunther
- 2005: Ernest in Love (Nissay), as Algernon Moncrieff
- 2005: R・Hatter
- 2005-06: Palermo Shines in the Setting Sun/Asian Winds!, as Nicola Gilotti
- 2005: TCA Special 2005 - Beautiful Melody, Beautiful Romance
- 2005: Hana no Michi ~ Yume no Michi ~ Towa no Michi
- 2006: Scout (Bow Hall), as Sean Finlay (lead role)

Cosmos Troupe 2006 - 2011

- 2006: Copacabana (Hakataza), as Sam Silver
- 2006 - 07: Sketches from the Life of Ryoma Sakamoto/The Classical Music ~I Love Chopin~, as Yoshinobu Tokugawa
- 2006: Sensation! Dinner Show
- 2006: TCA Special 2006 - Wonderful Dreamers
- 2006: Dream Memorandum
- 2007: Never Sleep (Bow Hall and Umeda Arts Theater), as Samuel Hart (lead role)
- 2007: Valencian Passion/Space Fantasista!, as Ramon and Rodrigo Granados (role-switch with Hokushou Kairi)
- 2007: Valencian Passion/Space Fantasista!, as Ramon (National Tour)
- 2007: TCA Special 2007 - 'Allo! Revue!
- 2007: Takarazuka Sky Stage 5th Anniversary Special
- 2007: 48th Takarazuka Buyoukai
- 2008: A Morning Breeze/Passion - A Journey of Love, as Tatsumi Eiji
- 2008: Singin' in the Rain (Umeda Arts Theater), as Cosmo Brown
- 2008: Paradise Prince/Dancing for You, as Anthony Black
- 2008: 49th Takarazuka Buyoukai
- 2009: Gyakuten Saiban: Yomigaeru Shinjitsu (Bow Hall and Nippon Seinenkan), as Phoenix Wright (lead role)
- 2009: Raindrops Fall on Roses/Amour, it's something like..., as Victor
- 2009: Gyakuten Saiban 2: Yomigaeru Shinjitsu, Futatabi... (Bow Hall and Akasaka ACT Theater), as Phoenix Wright (lead role)
- 2009: Takarazuka Special 2009 - Way to Glory
- 2009 - 10: Casablanca, as Victor Laszlo
- 2009: 50th Takarazuka Buyoukai
- 2010: Shangri-La (Drama City and Nippon Seinenkan), as Ran
- 2010: Trafalgar/Funky Sunshine, as Napoleon Bonaparte
- 2010: "R"ising!! Concert
- 2010: Takarazuka Special 2010 - Forever Takarazuka
- 2010 - 11: For Whom the Bell Tolls, as Agustin
- 2011: MUGEN! Dinner Show

Flower Troupe 2011 - 2014 as top star

- 2011: Phantom, as Phantom (Top Star debut)
- 2011: A Small Flower Has Bloomed/Love Potion II, as Shigeji (National Tour)
- 2011: 51st Takarazuka Buyoukai
- 2011: Melodies of Love~Dreams of Remembrance
- 2011: Takarazuka Special 2011 - Dreams Built on Tomorrow
- 2012: Resurrection/Canon ~Our Melody~, as Count Nekhlyudov
- 2012: At the End of A Long Spring/Canon ~Our Melody~, as Stephan (National Tour)
- 2012: Saint-Exupéry/CONGA!!, as Antoine de Saint-Exupéry
- 2012: Streak of Light Concert (Drama City)
- 2012: Takarazuka Special 2012 - The Stars ~ Pre - Pre - Centennial~
- 2013: The Rose of Versailles: Oscar and Andre, as Andre (Special Appearance)
- 2013: Ocean's 11, as Danny Ocean
- 2013: Sengoku BASARA (Tokyu Theater Orb), as Sanada Yukimura
- 2013: The Poem of Love and Revolution / Mr. Swing!, as Andrea Chénier
- 2013: T-ROAD Dinner Show
- 2014: Love of the Last Tycoon / Takarazuka Dazzling Dreams, asMonroe Stahr

== Stage ==
- 2014: ifi
- 2015: REIJIN Concert, Meil Parc Hall
- 2015: Showism VIII
- 2015: Take 5
- 2015: REIJIN SHOWA Era Concert
- 2015: Dinner and Talk Show
- 2016: Chikyu George's 14th production "The Love Bugs"
- 2016: Sister Act the Musical
- 2016: Olympic Concert 2016
- 2016: Takarazuka Dream Tours Special Concert

== TV ==
Drama

- Atelier (2015), as Chiga Nagai
- It's Not that I Can't Get Married, But I Don't Want To (2016), as Bokai Yamamoto
- Black Forceps (Season 2 episode 2) (2024), as Asami

Other Programs

- SMAP×SMAP All Star Sports Competition (2015)
- Takarazuka Dream Tours (2016)

== Albums ==
- 2015: REIJIN
- 2015: REIJIN ~ Showa Era~
- 2015: L'Ange
