= Osa =

Osa or OSA may refer to:

== Places ==
- Osa Peninsula, in Costa Rica
- Osa (canton), in the province of Puntarenas in Costa Rica
- Osa Conservation Area, an administrative area in Costa Rica
- Osa, India, a village in Allahabad, India
- Osa, Iran, a village in Mazandaran Province, Iran
- Osa, Warmian-Masurian Voivodeship, north Poland
- Osa, a minor tributary of the Vistula, Poland
- Osa, Norway, a village in Ulvik municipality, Vestland county, Norway
- Osa, Russia, the name of several inhabited localities in Russia
- Osa, Missouri, a community in the United States

== Military ==
- Osa-class missile boat
- 9K33 Osa (SA-8 Gecko), a Soviet surface-to-air missile launcher
- M79 Osa, a Serbian/Yugoslav rocket launcher
- Avia B.122 Osa, a Czech trainer aircraft
- Osa (handgun) a Russian non-lethal handgun
- Osa (drone), Ukrainian uncrewed aerial vehicle (UAV)

== Schools ==
- Oakland School for the Arts
- Old Scona Academic High School, a school in Edmonton, Canada

== Science and technology ==
- Optical spectrum analyzer
- Osa (plant), a monotypic genus of plant in the family Rubiaceae

=== Medicine ===
- Obstructive sleep apnea, a sleep-related breathing disorder in which upper airway obstruction leads to reduced breathing that interrupts normal sleep
- Osteosarcoma, a malignant neoplasm of bone

=== Computing ===
- Open Scripting Architecture, for AppleScript
- Open Services Access, a set of standards for mobile telecommunications
- Online Sexual Activity
- Open Systems Adapter, an IBM card for mainframes
- Open systems architecture, a telecommunication standard

== Businesses and organizations ==
- Oceania Swimming Association
- Ontario Soccer Association
- Ontario Society of Artists
- Open Solutions Alliance
- Optical Society of America, now Optica
- Optimization Systems Associates, a defunct American software company
- Order of Saint Anna, a Russian order of chivalry
- Order of Saint Augustine (Ordo Sancti Augustini), the Roman Catholic Augustinian order
- Oregon Student Association
- Organization of the Secret Army, French far-right nationalist group in Algeria
- OSA, a Czech Republic performance rights organisation
- Oriental Society of Australia, now the Australian Society for Asian Humanities
- OSA Group, a Constructivist architectural association of the 1920s based in the USSR
- The Odisha Society of the Americas
- Intelligence-Security Agency of Bosnia and Herzegovina (Obavještajno sigurnosna / bezbjednosna agencija, or OSA-OBA), an intelligence and security agency of Bosnia and Herzegovina
- Office of the Science Advisor, of the United States Environmental Protection Agency
- Office of Special Affairs, a controversial department of the Church of Scientology
- Operation Save America

== People ==
- Sumire Haruno, Japanese actress, nicknamed Osa
- Osa Johnson (1894-1953), American filmmaker
- Osa Maliki (1907–1969), Indonesian politician
- Osa Massen (1914–2006), Danish actress
- Osa Odighizuwa (born 1998), American football player
- Lars Osa (1860–1958), Norwegian artist

== Other uses ==
- Old Stone Age or Paleolithic
- Office of Secret Actions, a fictional government department in the video game Return to Castle Wolfenstein
- Official Secrets Act, legislation in several countries
- Online Safety Act (disambiguation), legislation in various countries (including Australia, Sri Lanka, United Kingdom, and United States)
- Online savings account
- Open skies agreement
- Osaka International Airport (former IATA code: OSA)

== See also ==
- Ossa (disambiguation)
