= Sei Matobu =

Japanese actress (born 1976)

- 真飛 聖
- Born: 13 October 1976 (age 50); Kawasaki, Kanagawa, Japan
- Occupation: Actress
- Years active: 1995–present
- Agent: Watanabe Entertainment
- Known for: 1995: joined Takarazuka Revue, assigned to Hoshigumi; 2005: transferred to Hanagumi; 2008: inaugurated as Hanagumi's Top Star; 2011: left Takarazuka Revue, started entertainment activities; 2012: first appeared on TV drama
- Notable work: Takarazuka Revue; Gubijin; Aibō; Films; Zakurozaka no Adauchi
- Television: AIBOU: Tokyo Detective Duo
- Awards: Osaka Cinema Festival New Actress Award (2015) Zakurozaka no Adauchi

Sei Matobu (Japanese: 真飛 聖, Hepburn: Matobu Sei; born October 13, 1976) is a Japanese actress who is a former Hanagumi Top Star of the Takarazuka Revue. In addition to her stage roles, she has acted for television, feature films, radio and advertisements. She is represented by Watanabe Entertainment.

Born in Kawasaki, Kanagawa, she is nicknamed "Yuu" (ゆう, Yū). Sometimes, she was called "Unta" in her early school days. She graduated from Nakanobu Gakuen High School (now Hōyū Gakuin High School).

== Biography timeline ==
=== Early life ===
She learned ballet since she was a child.

=== Career ===
According to an interview from the Sankei Shimbun, her encounter of Takarazuka Revue was recommended from her friends in her third year of junior high school. "It was from a friend who got me into Takarazuka after seeing The Rose of Versailles (Tsukigumi, starring Mayo Suzukaze), and I was shown Kageki (a monthly magazine) without receiving it. I did not know about Takarazuka at all, but I decided to enter with that," she answered. She herself was against her interest ballet that started at the age of three, "I got taller and my balance became worse for becoming a ballerina, maybe it was because I thought that I could keep going. It is a wonderful magical edge," she explained her feelings that she did not keep continuing her ballet.

In 1993, she made her second admission to the Takarazuka Music College.

In March 1995, she joined the Takarazuka Revue Complex as a student in its Stage 81. Her score at the time of her entry was 12th out of 41 people. She made her debut with Kokkyō no nai Chizu. Her colleague during her active duties was Rin Yuma, and the graduates were Yūga Yamato, Miyo Fuzuki, Rira Maikaze, Mizuka Hanase, and Rea Ranka.

On May 1, 1995, she was assigned to Hoshigumi.

In 1996, she was selected as the black angel in Elisabeth.

In 1999, she was starring for the first time in a rookie performance with Waga Ai wa Yama no Kanata ni.

In 2000, she was selected as a member of the Berlin performance.

In 2002, with Winter Garden, and a double starring role with Kei Asazumi, she made her first performance at the Bow Hall.

In 2003, at the Nissay Theatre performance of Singin' in the Rain, she challenged her first female role, in which she played the actress Lina Lamont.

In December 2003, she played the role of the Prince in her first external appearance of Cinderella.

In 2004, in the Bow Hall performance of Flower Stop, she made her first starring role at the Bow Hall.

In 2005, her first dinner show, Sky Blue, was held. In the same year, she was reclassified to Hanagumi on 15 August.

In November 2006, she starred for the first time on a Theatre Drama City performance with Mind Traveller.

On December of the same year, along with Mao Ayabuki, she was promoted to Hanagumi's 2nd Men's Star in the Great Theatre Performance, The Case of Kogoro Akechi -Black Lizard-/Tuxedo Jazz, the following year.

On December 25, 2007, she was inaugurated as the Top Star of the Hanagumi as a successor to Sumire Haruno. It was the first time in twenty years that the Hanagumi Top Star was from another group since Mizuki Ooura, who took its position in 1987. Matobu's partner was Ayane Sakurano.

In February 2008, the Chunichi Theatre performance of Melancholic Gigolo -Abdomen Heiress-/Love Symphony 2 became her first performance after taking position as the Top Star.

In May 2008, in Ai to Shino Arabia/Red Hot Sea, she became the Showcase performance at the Takarazuka Great Theatre.

On January 14, 2009, her first solo CD, Hanama, was released. She also challenged lyrics on her coupling song. One. In the same year, with stage plays such as Taiō Shijinki, Aibō, etc., she continues to play leading roles by appearing in television dramas.

In May 2010, with her concluding festivity, the Tokyo Takarazuka Theater performance Gubijin –Aratanaru Densetsu–, her partner, Sakurano, resigned.

In July 2010, from Uruwashi Sabrina/Exciter!!, Hana Ranno became her partner.

On April 24, 2011, she made her concluding festivities with the Tokyo Takarazuka Theater performance, Prelude of Love/Le Paradis!! -Seinaru Toki-, and left the Takarazuka Revue Company.

On July of the same year, her Talk & Live was held at the Tokyo Kaikan.

On September of the same year, she joined Watanabe Entertainment and start performing entertainment activities.

In April 2012, she made her first appearance in a television drama with 37-Sai de Isha ni natta Boku: Kenshui Junjō Monogatari (Kansai Telecasting Corporation).

With the film, Zakurozaka no Adauchi, published in 2014, she won the 10th Osaka Cinema Festival New Actress Award.

From 2015, "I want to become an actress who can perform conte," she desired. It is serious in terms of Aibō but it is a reputation, since the Takarazuka era, she also had many third roles, and had a reputation for comedy.

In October 2016, she appeared as Shushi Imaichi at IQ246: Kareinaru Jiken-bo (TBS Television).

== Major stage appearances of Takarazuka Revue years ==
=== Hoshigumi era ===
- Mar 1995, Kokkyō no nai Chizu*Debut
- May 1996, Futaridake ga Waru Newcomer Performance: Kicho (Played by: Wataru Kozuki)/Passion Blue
- Nov 1996, Elisabeth Black Angel, Newcomer Performance: Death (Played by: Nao Ayaki)
- May 1997, Makoto no Gunzō Newcomer Performance: Sozaburo Kuro (Played by: Nao Ayaki)/Attraction II
- Nov 1997, Dar Lake's Love Newcomer Performance: Jasville (Played by: Naoki Ema)
- Jun 1998, Emperor Newcomer Performance: Bustle (Played by: Yu Emao)/Hemingway Review
- Aug 1998, Temptation of Icon (Bow—Tokyo Special) Seryoja
- Feb 1999, West Side Story, Baby John, Newcomer Performance: Riff (Played by: Yu Emao)
- Aug 1999, Waga Ai wa Yama no Kanata ni Ryurin/Great Century -Memories & Melodies- (Hakata-za)
- Oct 1999, Waga Ai wa Yama no Kanata ni Newcomer Performance: (Played by: Ko Minoru)/Great Century -Memories & Melodies- *First starring as newcomer
- Dec 1999, Epiphany (Bow) Shingoro Ando
- Mar 2000, Love Insurance (Drama City—Tokyo Special) Jeff
- Jun 2000, Takarazuka Snow–Moon–Flower/Sunrise Takarazuka (Berlin performance)
- Aug 2000, Golden Pharaoh Paki, Newcomer Performance: Seita Hato (Played by: Yu Emao)/Birei Neko (Tokyo only)
- Oct 2000, Hanafubuki Koi Fubuki (Bow—Tokyo Special) Ishida Mitsunari
- Jan 2001, Flower of Narihira Akimune, Newcomer Performance: Ariwara no Narihira (Played by: Ko Minoru)/Yume wa Sekai o Kake meguru *Starring as newcomer
- Mar 2001, The Rose of Versailles -Oscar and André- Alan, Newcomer Performance: Oscar (Played by: Ko Minoru) *Starring as newcomer
- Jun 2001, Gone with the Wind (National Tour) Renee Picart
- Oct 2001, Hoshigumi Encore Concert (Bow)
- Nov 2001, Flower of Narihira Akimune, Newcomer Performance: Ariwara no Narihira (Played by: Tatsuki Koju)/Southern Cross Review II *Starring as newcomer
- Apr 2002, Prague no Haru Jaromir/Lucky Star
- Sep 2002, Winter Garden -Haru o Machi Wabibu Fuyu no Teien- (Bow—Tokyo Special) Klaus Augustaler*First starring in Bow Hall
- Nov 2002, Glass no Fūkei Leonardo/Babylon -Fuyū suru Matenrō-
- May 2003, Singin' in the Rain (Nissay) Lisa Lamont
- Jul 2003, Ōke ni Sasagu Uta Camante
- Dec 2003, Cinderella (Outdoor performance) Prince
- Feb 2004, 1914/Love (Maurice Yuriro)/Takarazuka Kenran
- Jul 2004, Hana no isogi (Bow—Tokyo Special) Ono no Takamura*Starring in Bow Hall
- Oct 2004, Hana Mau Nagayasu -Gensō to Yōkihi- Kōho Imei/
- Feb 2005, Ōke ni Sasagu Uta (Nissay) Ubaldo
- Mar 2005, Sei Matobu Dinner Show Sky Blue *First dinner show
- May 2005, Nagasaki Shigurezaka Sasori/Soul of Shiva!!

=== Hanagumi era ===
- Nov 2005, Palermo of Rakuyo Earl of Rodrigo Salvatore Fontini/Asian Winds!
- Mar 2006, Appartement Cinema (Drama City—Tokyo Special—Nagoya Special) Orlando
- Aug 2006, Phantom Earl of Philip de Chandon
- Nov 2006, Mind Traveller (Drama City—Tokyo Special) Max Plummer *First starring in Drama City
- Feb 2007, The Case of Kogoro Akechi -Black Lizard- Junichi Amamiya/Tuxedo Jazz
- Jul 2007, The Tale of Genji Asaki Yumemishi II (Umeda Arts Theater) Time Spirit
- Sep 2007, Adeu Marseille Simon Berard/Love Symphony

=== Hanagumi Top era ===
- Feb 2008, Melancholic Gigoro Daniel/Love Symphony II (Nissay)
- May 2008, Ai to Shi no Arabia/Red Hot Sea Thomas Keith
- Dec 2008, The Rose of Versailles Side Story —Alain Version— Alain de Soissons/Enter the Review (National Tour)
- Jan 2009, Taiō Shijinki –Tusin no Hoshi no moto ni– Tamudoku
- May 2009, Sorrow of Cordoba Elio Salvador/Red Hot SeaII (National Tour)
- Jul 2009, Me and My Girl (Umeda Arts Theater) William Snybunsen (Bill)
- Sep 2009, The Rose of Versailles Side Story –Andre Version– Andre Grandia/Exciter!!
- Dec 2009, Aibō (Drama City—Tokyo Special) Ukyo Sugishita
- Mar 2010, Gubijin —Aratanaru Densetsu— Xiang Yu
- Jul 2010, Uruwashi no Sabrina Linus Larrabie/Exciter!!
- Nov 2010, Melancholic Gigoro Daniel/Love Symphony (National Tour)
- Feb 2011, Prelude of Love Freddie Clark/Le Paradis!! -Seinaru Toki- *Leaving performance
- Mar 2011, Sei Matobu Dinner Show For You

== Discography ==
=== CD ===
- HanaMai (released Jan 14, 2009, Takarazuka Creative Arts)
1. HanaMai (Lyrics: Yoshiyasu Ichikawa—Takahiro Iida, Composition—Arrangement: Takahiro Iida)
2. One (Lyrics: Sei Matobu—Yoshiyasu Ichikawa, Composition: Yoshiyasu Ichikawa, Arrangement: Taichi Nakamura)
3. Mikazuki (Lyrics: Ayaka, Composition: Yoshihiko Nishio—Ayaka, Arrangement: Taichi Nakamura)
4. HanaMai (Instrumental)
5. One (Instrumental)
6. Mikazuki (Instrumental)

== Main appearances after leaving Takarazuka Revue ==
=== TV dramas ===
- 37-Sai de Isha ni natta Boku: Kenshui Junjō Monogatari (10 Apr – Jun 19, 2012, KTV) – as Naomi Aizawa
- Renai Kentei Episode 4 (Jun 24, 2012, NHK BS Premium) – as Kanori Sawada
- AIBOU: Tokyo Detective Duo season11 Episode 1 – season13 Final Episode (Oct 10, 2012 – Mar 18, 2015, EX) – as Etsuko Usui
- Kuro Neko, tokidoki Hanaya (1 Oct – Nov 19, 2013, NHK BS Premium) – as Atsuko Kinugawa
- Tenchū: Yami no Shioki Hito Episode 1 (Jan 24, 2014, CX) – as Mayumi Nagase
- Saikō no omotenashi (Feb 28, 2014, NTV) – as Chinatsu Suzuki
- Renzoku Drama W Tokusou (11 May – Jun 8, 2014, Wowow) – as Tomoko Sakurai
- Kayō Drama Masshiro Episode 2 (Jan 20, 2015, TBS) – as Reiko Tamagaki
- Suiyō Drama Dr. Rintarō (15 Apr – Jun 17, 2015, NTV) – as Machiko Yabe
- Renzoku Drama W Shingari: Yamaichi Shōken: Saigo no Seisen (Aug 2015 –, Wowow) – as Gamou
- Mokuyō Drama Isan Sōzoku (22 Oct – Dec 17, 2015) – as Riko Kanazawa
- Kinyō Drama Watashi wo Hanasanaide (15 Jan – Mar 18, 2016, TBS) – as Madam
- Saturday Night at the Mysteries Shūchakueki Series 30 "Satsujin no Saiken" (Jun 25, 2016, EX) – as Ayuko Muneiko
- Kinyō Drama Kami no Shita o Motsu Otoko Episode 4 (Jul 29, 2016, TBS) – as Eiko Akaike
- Drama Special Miyuki Miyabe Suspense Mobōhan (22, Sep 23, 2016, TX) – as Yuko Asai
- Nichiyō Gekijō IQ246: Kareinaru Jiken-bo (16 Oct – Dec 18, 2016, TBS) – as Shuko Imaichi
- Kanjō 8-gōsen Episodes 4–6 (5–19 Feb 2017, Fuji TV Two) – as Fumi Sakamoto
- PTA Grandpa! (2 Apr – May 21, 2017, NHK BS Premium) – as Miyako Muso
- Renzoku Drama W Ishi Tsubute: Gaimushō Kimitsu-hi o Abaita Sōsa Ni-ka no Otoko-tachi (5 Nov – Dec 24, 2017, Wowow) – as Suzaku Sugitani
- Mokuyō Gekijō Tonari no Kazoku wa Aoku Mieru (18 Jan – Mar 22, 2018, CX) – as Miyuki Komiyama
- Mikaiketsu no Onna Keishichō Bunsho Sōsa-kan Episode 4 (May 10, 2018, EX) – as Satomi Fujita
- Your Turn to Kill (2019, NTV)
- Fixer (2023, Wowow) – as Hiroko Yokomiya
- Sunset (2023, Wowow) – as Mari Hasebe
- Laughing Matryoshka (2024, NTV) - introduced in episode 4 as a mysterious woman who gazes at the back of Michiue as she leaves the hospital where Suzuki is, later revealed to be his wife

=== Films ===
- The Apology King (2013), Minowa's wife
- Partners: The Movie III (2014), Etsuko Usui
- Snow on the Blades (2014), Masa
- Yamikin Ushijima-kun (Part4) (2016), Mariko Imai
- Teiichi: Battle of Supreme High (2017)
- Call Boy (2018)
- The Forest of Love (2019)
- Midnight Swan (2020)
- Your Turn to Kill: The Movie (2021)
- Ginji the Speculator (2022)
- Matched (2024), Akane Nishiyama
- 52-Hertz Whales (2024), Yuki Mishima
- Stolen Identity: Final Hacking Game (2024), Itsuko Kubota
- Hakkenden: Fiction and Reality (2024)
- All of Tokyo! (2024), Kanae Igarashi
- Rental Family (2025), Masami
- Titanic Ocean (2026)
- Matched: True Love (2026), Akane Nishiyama
- The High School Family (2027), Maki Yashiki

=== Television ===
- Takarazuka Premiere (Wowow, Apr 2012 – Mar 2013) – Navigator
- TV de France-go (NHK-E, Apr–Sep 2013)

=== Radio ===
- Sei Matobu: Heartful Days (InterFM, Oct 2012 – Mar 2013, Saturdays 10:35-11:00) – Personality
- Words of Wisdom —Tokimeku, Kotoba— (JFN, Oct 2016 –, Weekdays 12:55 - 13:00) – Navigator

=== Advertisements ===
- Nestle Japan—Nescafé (2011)

=== Stage ===
- Koi to Ongaku (Dec 2012 – Jan 2013, Parco Theater, Morinomiya Piloti Hall, Izmiti 21 Large Hall) – as Mysterious lady (heroine) (co-starred with Goro Inagaki)
- Musical My Fair Lady (May 2013, Nissay Theatre) – as Eliza (heroine) (double cast with Hiromu Kiriya)
- Love and Music II: Me and She Manager (Jun–Jul 2014, Parco Theater) – as Kimiko
- On the Town (Sep–Oct 2014, Aoyama Theatre, Orix Theatre) – as Ivy Smith (Miss Subway)
- Stand By You: Katei-nai Saikon (Jan 2015, Theatre Creation) – as Aiko Sakaki
- Motono Mokuami (Aug–Sep 2015, Shinbashi Enbujō—Osaka Shochiku-za) – as Oshige
- Koi to Ongaku Final: Jikan Gekijō no Kiseki (Feb 2016, Parco Theater) – as Reiko Mine
- Musical My Fair Lady (Jul–Aug 2016, Tokyo Metropolitan Theatre Play House) – as Eliza (heroine) (double cast with Hiromu Kiriya)
- Player (Aug 2017, Bunkamura Theatre Cocoon) – as Director Azuma

== Award history ==
- 2003 Takarazuka Revue Fiscal Year Award "Effort Award"
- 2003 Hankyu Sumire Society—Pansy Prize "New Face Award"
- 2009 Hankyu Sumire Society—Pansy Prize "Male Performance Award"
- 2010 Takarazuka Revue Fiscal Year Award (2009) "Outstanding Performance Award"
- 2015 10th Osaka Cinema Festival "New Actress Award" – Zakurozaka no Adauchi
