= Yoon So-ho =

South Korean actor

- Born: Lee Jung-hoon; November 20, 1991 (age 34); Daegu, South Korea
- Education: Seoul Institute of the Arts – Department of Acting (dropped out)
- Occupation: Actor
- Years active: 2011–present
- Agent: S.M. C&C

Korean name
- Hangul: 이정훈
- RR: I Jeonghun
- MR: I Chŏnghun

Stage name
- Hangul: 윤소호
- RR: Yun Soho
- MR: Yun Soho

Lee Jung-hoon (born November 20, 1991), better known by his stage name Yoon So-ho, is a South Korean theatre and musical actor.

From November 2015 to March 2016, Yoon portrayed Marius Pontmercy in a South Korean adaptation from the musical Les Misérables, for which he won the Daegu International Musical Festival (DIMF) Award for Best New Actor.

== Theater ==
Year	English title	Korean title	Role	Ref.
2023	Beethoven	베토벤	Caspar van Beethoven	
2024	La Rose de Versailles	베르사유의 장미	Bernard Châtelet	

== Awards and nominations ==
Year	Award	Category	Nominated work	Result
2016	10th Daegu International Musical Festival Awards	Best New Actor	Les Misérables	Won
