= Kei Aran =

Zainichi Korean actress (born 1970)

Touko Yasuda (安田 瞳子, Yasuda Touko; 야스다 도우코; born October 9, 1970), known professionally as Kei Aran (安蘭 けい, Aran Kei), is a South Korean actress and former top star otokoyaku (an actress who plays male roles) of the Japanese Takarazuka Revue's Star Troupe. She joined the revue in 1991 and became the top star in 2007, five years after her classmates Sumire Haruno (the former top star of Flower Troupe) and Hikaru Asami (former top star of Snow Troupe) became top stars. She resigned from the company in April 2009 and is currently pursuing an acting career outside of the Revue.

She is original from Konan, Shiga, Japan, and her nickname is "Touko".

She is of Zainichi Korean descent and the first from such background to become the top star of the company. However, she is not the first non-Japanese actress to become a Takarazuka top star: Ran Ootori, who is of Chinese descent, was top star of Star Troupe from 1975 until 1979.

== Troupe history ==
- Snow Troupe: 1991–2000
- Star Troupe: 2000–2009

== Biography ==
Aran graduated at the top of her class from the Takarazuka Music School in 1991. She was the last member of her class to become top star, and also the last to retire from the Revue when she did so in April 2009.

She was promoted by the company in 1999 along with Haruno and Asami. Before she was promoted to top star status, she was considered as one of top-stars-in-waiting along with former top stars Kei Takashiro and Yūga Yamato (Cosmos Troupe), Jun Sena (Moon Troupe), Natsuki Mizu (Snow Troupe).

The last name of her stage name, Aran is from the protagonist of a Korean legend Legend of Ariran.

Starting her career in Snow Troupe, she developed her singing and acting alongside Takarazuka legends such as Yu Todoroki, Yoka Wao and Tatsuki Kouju. With the 1996 production of Elisabeth, she became the first to perform the lead role of Der Tod in the understudy performance. Later on, she participated in two Bow Hall performances starring Wao (Grand Shanghai and Wuthering Heights), in which she had prominent roles. In 1998, she had her first Bow Hall lead performance, Icarus.

In 1999, Aran formed The Wonder Three along with Hikaru Asami and Kouki Naruse. The trio had a Bow Hall performance under the same name. Although similar trios of younger actresses could also be found at that time in Flower Troupe (Haruno, Sena and Mizu) and Moon Troupe (Ōzora, Kiriya and Yamato), they were the only trio that was considered official. This trio also held the main roles in the special performance of Arch of Triumph; this is the first, and to date, only, instance of the Revue having three casts for one show (the main cast led by Todoroki, the new actor cast led by Rea Ranka, and the special cast led by Asami).

In 2000, she was transferred to Star Troupe and became the second man for Ko Minoru, Tatsuki Kouju and Wataru Kozuki. When Kozuki had the lead in A Song for Kingdoms (a variation of the opera Aida) as her top star debut in 2003, Aran was cast as Aida, a role which brought much applause. In the same year, she also held the lead roles in performances of Singin' in the Rain and Ganryuu.

Marking the 90th anniversary for the company in 2004, Aran had special appearances in two Cosmos Troupe productions. The first was Lightning in the Daytime, where she replaced Mizu in the Tokyo performance. This was followed by the role of Count Philippe de Chandon in Phantom, where she rejoined former Snow Troupe troupemates Wao and Mari Hanafusa.

In 2006, she had a special appearance in the Snow Troupe production of Rose of Versailles. This was both the first and last performance with classmate and former troupe mate Asami since Aran's troupe transfer.

== Notable roles and performance ==
=== Snow Troupe New Actor era ===
- Elisabeth – Der Tod
- Natasha of the Rainbow – Sanjou Kaoru

=== Snow Troupe era ===
- Grand Shanghai – Wong Jin-Shun (Bow Hall performance, starring Yoka Wao)
- Wuthering Heights – Edgar (Bow Hall performance, starring Yoka Wao)
- Frozen Tomorrow – Bonnie and Clyde – Jeremy Methvin (Bow Hall performance, starring Tatsuki Kouju and Hitomi Tsukikage)
- Icarus – Icarus (first leading performance at Takarazuka Bow Hall)
- Arch of Triumph – Hyrne Alvarez (regular cast)/Boris Morosow (special cast)
- Gone with the Wind – Ashley Wilkes
- Hanafubuki Koifubuki – Ishikawa Goemon (second leading performance at Takarazuka Bow Hall)

=== Star Troupe era ===
- Rose of Versailles: Oscar and Andre – Hans Axel Von Fersen
- Gone with the Wind – Ashley Wilkes
- The Prague Spring – Jan Palach
- A Song for Kingdoms – Aida
- Singin' in the Rain – Don Lockwood
- Ganryuu – Sasaki Kojiro
- Lightning in the Daytime – Edmond de Lambrouse (Special appearance, replacing Natsuki Mizu in the Tokyo run)
- Phantom – Count Philippe de Chandon (Special appearance for Cosmos Troupe)
- Ch'ang-an, Full of Swirling Flowers – An Lu-shan
- Shigure Hill Road in Nagasaki – Rasha
- The Dragon Star – Ryuusei (Last leading performance before being top star)
- Rose of Versailles: Fersen and Marie Antoinette – Andre (Takarazuka run)/Oscar François de Jarjayes (Tokyo run)
- Rose of Versailles: Oscar – Andre (Special appearance for Snow Troupe, shared with Wataru Kozuki, Sumire Haruno, Natsuki Mizu, Jun Sena and Kei Takashiro)
- Too Short a Time to Fall in Love – Anthony Randolph

=== Star Troupe Top Star era ===
- Hays Code – Raymond Woodrow (Top Star debut)
- Sakura / Secret Hunter – Dagobert (Top Star debut at Grand Theater)
- El Halcon – Tyrian Persimmon
- Red and Black – Julien Sorel
- The Scarlet Pimpernel – Percy Blakeney
- Side Story: The Rose of the Versailles – Bernard / NeoDandyism III – Bernard Châtelet
- My Dear New Orleans / A Bientôt – Joy Bee (last musical with Takarazuka)

=== After Takarazuka ===
- The Musical Aida – Aida
- Wonderful Town – Ruth Sherwood
- Edith Piaf – Piaf
- Musical MITSUKO – Mitsuko Coudenhove-Kalergi
- Antony and Cleopatra (Play directed by Yukio Ninagawa) – Cleopatra
- Chess in Concert – Florence
- Sunset Blvd. – Norma Desmond
- Alice in Wonderland – Alice
- Next to Normal – Diana
- Ghosts, Henril Ibsen (Play directed by Shintaro Mori) – Mrs. Helene Alving
- Lady Day directed by Tamiya Kuriyama – Billie Holiday
- Chess the Musical – Florence
- The Scarlet Pimpernel – Marguerite
- Termite Nest, Yukio Mishima (Play directed by Kenichi Tani) – Taeko
- Little Voice – Mari Hoff
- Billy Elliot – Mrs. Wilkinson

=== Personal concerts ===
As a member of Takarazuka:

- The Wonder Three
- Rough Time
- Late Show
- Sense

After Takarazuka:

- Uno, 2009 – Tokyo International Forum
- Aran Kei Live, Hakobune 2010 – The Galaxy Theatre
- Super Duets with Ryuichi Kawamura 2013 – TOKYU THEATRE Orb
- Dramatic Concert 2016 – Orchard Hall

== A note on Rose of Versailles ==
Like Mizu, Rose of Versailles has played an important part in Aran's Takarazuka career. She is one of the very few that has been in roles of Oscar, Andre and Hans Axel Von Fersen, the three prominent male roles in the production.

| Preceded by Wataru Kozuki | Top Star (Otokoyaku) for Star Troupe; 2007–2009 | Succeeded by Reon Yuzuki |
