= Lisa (South Korean singer) =

South Korean singer (born 1980)

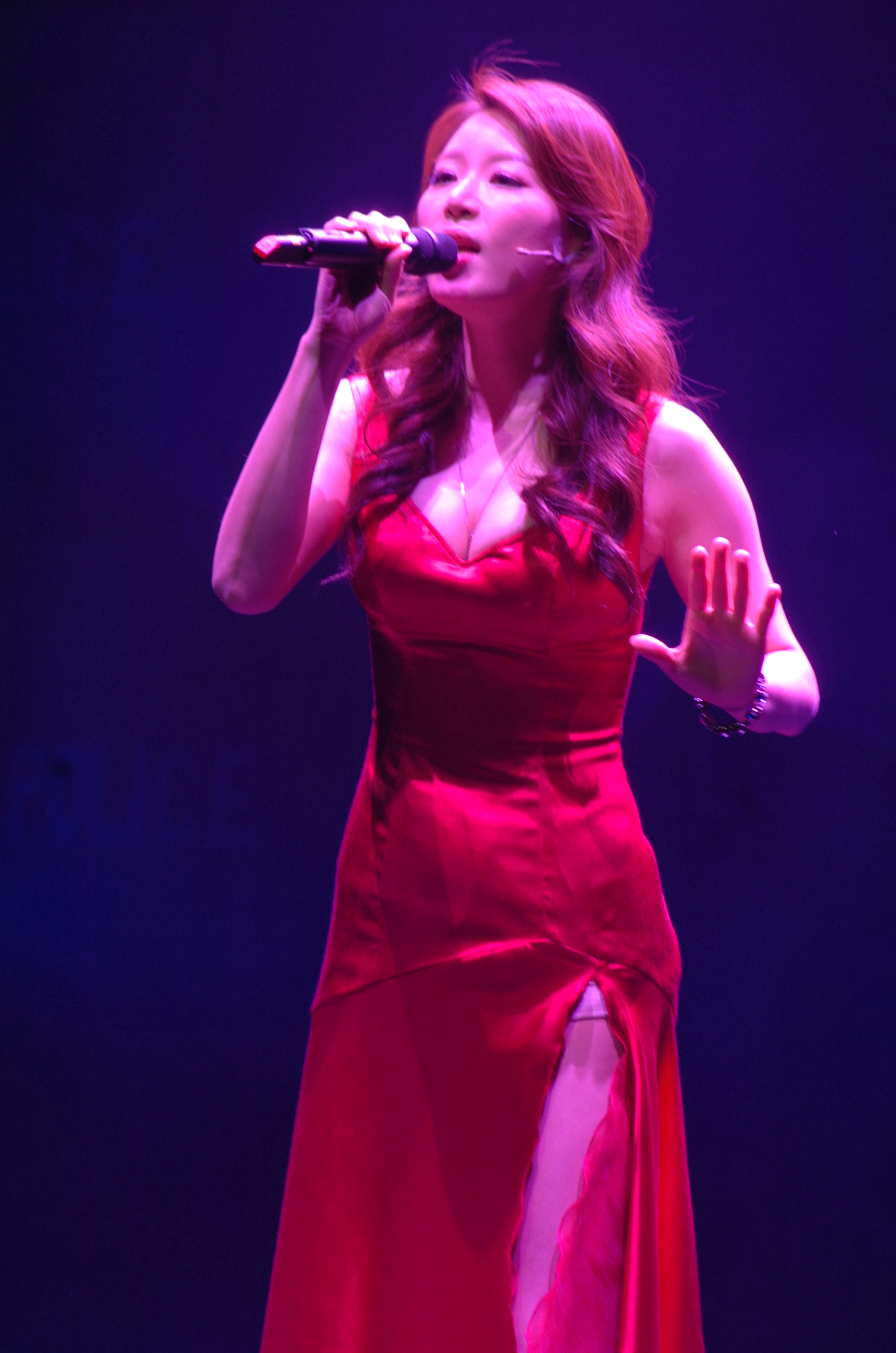
- Lisa in 2012

Background information
- Born: Jung Hee-seon; February 25, 1980 (age 46); South Korea
- Occupations: Singer; actress
- Years active: 2003–present
- Labels: R&D Work

Jung Hee-seon (Korean: 정희선; born February 25, 1980), known professionally as Lisa (리사), is a South Korean singer and musical theatre actress. She debuted as a singer in 2003 and made her musical theatre debut in 2008. She has starred in Korean productions of Hedwig and the Angry Inch, Jekyll & Hyde and Rebecca.

== Discography ==
=== Studio albums ===
Title	Album details	Peak chart positions	Sales
Title	Album details	KOR	Sales
Finally	Released: November 4, 2003; Label: Sony Music; Formats: CD, cassette	29	KOR: 6,580
Mind Blowin'	Released: May 24, 2006; Label: Stone Music Entertainment; Formats: CD, cassette	—	
Featherlight	Released: November 23, 2007; Label: Stone Music Entertainment; Formats: CD	40	KOR: 1,287
"—" denotes a recording that did not chart or was not released in that territory

=== Singles ===
Title	Year	Peak chart positions	Album
Title	Year	KOR	Album
"Wonder If You Loved Me" (사랑하긴 했었나요)	2003	No data	Finally
"Know Love After Separation" (헤어져야 사랑을 알죠)	2006	No data	Mind Blowin'
"Destiny" (인연) (feat. Bobby Kim)	2006	No data	Mind Blowin'
"Sijakboda kkeuchi areumdaun sarang" (시작보다 끝이 아름다운 사랑) (with Lee Seung-chul)	2007	No data	Featherlight
"Tonight (Tonight Is The Night)" (with Dynamic Duo)	2007	No data	Non-album single
"Geuryeo bomnida" (그려 봅니다)	2007	No data	Featherlight
"Again"	2008	No data	Non-album singles
"The Person Who I Will Meet" (내가 만날 사람) (feat. Eun Ji-won and Hareem)	2008	No data	Non-album singles
"Shall We Get Married?" (우리 결혼할까?) (with Miryo)	2010	11	Non-album singles
"We Can't Be Friends" (우린 친구가 될 수 없어) (with Brian Joo)	2010	60	Non-album singles
"Christmas Time" (with Sung Si-kyung, Park Hyo-shin, Seo In-guk, Brian Joo, Park Hak-ki, Kim Hyeong-jung and Kyun Woo)	2010	25	Jelly Christmas
"Always"	2012	—	Non-album singles
"Woman" (여자)	2012	52	Non-album singles
"Christmas Love"	2014	—	Non-album singles
"No Matter"	2015	—	Non-album singles
"We Are Champions" (우리는 챔피언)	2016	—	Non-album singles
"I'm Sorry"	2017	—	Non-album singles
"Empty" (空)	2019	—	Non-album singles
"Lazy Love"	2020	—	Non-album singles
"All I Ask" (부탁)	2023	—	Non-album singles
"Take My Hand"	2024	—	Non-album singles
"—" denotes a recording that did not chart.

== Filmography ==
=== Variety shows ===
Year	Title	Role	Notes
2017	King of Mask Singer	Contestant	as "Miss Korea 2017 Azalea" (Episodes 103-104)
2018	King of Mask Singer	Contestant	as "Magic Girl" (Episodes 183-184)
2021	My Teenage Girl	Vocal Teacher	

=== Film ===
Year	Title	Role	Notes
2017	Ordinary Person	Singer, Ji Yeong-mi	Special appearance

=== Theater ===
Year	English title	Korean title	Role	Ref.
2024	La Rose de Versailles	베르사유의 장미	Duchesse de Polignac	

* Note: Most, if not all, large scale South Korean musicals are generally double or triple cast for a role. The actors share the role equally and alternate throughout the eight show week.

== Awards and nominations ==
Year	Award	Category	Nominated work	Result	Ref.
2012	Daegu Musical Awards	Star of the Year Award		Won	
