= The Rose of Versailles (film) =

2025 film by Ai Yoshimura

- Theatrical release poster
- Kanji: ベルサイユのばら
- Revised Hepburn: Berusaiyu no Bara
- Directed by: Ai Yoshimura
- Screenplay by: Tomoko Konparu
- Based on: The Rose of Versailles by Riyoko Ikeda
- Starring: Miyuki Sawashiro; Aya Hirano; Toshiyuki Toyonaga; Kazuki Kato
- Cinematography: Takashi Yanagida
- Music by: Hiroyuki Sawano; Kohta Yamamoto
- Production company: MAPPA
- Distributed by: Toho Next; Avex Pictures
- Release date: January 31, 2025
- Running time: 113 minutes
- Country: Japan
- Language: Japanese

The Rose of Versailles (Note: Japanese: ベルサイユのばら, Hepburn: Berusaiyu no Bara) is a 2025 Japanese animated musical romance film produced by MAPPA and distributed by Toho Next and Avex Pictures, based on the 1972 manga by Riyoko Ikeda. Directed by Ai Yoshimura and written by Tomoko Konparu, the film stars the voices of Miyuki Sawashiro, Aya Hirano, Toshiyuki Toyonaga, and Kazuki Kato. It was released in Japan on January 31, 2025.

Netflix licensed the film, and began streaming it on its platform on April 30, 2025.

== Plot ==
In the late 18th century, four people: Oscar François de Jarjayes, a general who is a woman raised as a son, Marie Antoinette, the daughter of Austrian empress that is destined to become queen, André Grandier, Oscar's childhood friend, and Hans Axel von Fersen, a Swedish aristocrat, meet in Versailles, France and live their respective destinies while being tossed by the tides of the era.

== Voice cast ==
Character	Japanese voice cast (Note: Attributed to multiple references:)	English voice cast (Note: Attributed to multiple references:)
Oscar François de Jarjayes	Miyuki Sawashiro	Caitlin Glass
Marie Antoinette	Aya Hirano	Megan Shipman
André Grandier	Toshiyuki Toyonaga	Brandon McInnis
Hans Axel von Fersen	Kazuki Kato	Ryan Colt Levy; Andy Delos Santos (singing)
Alain de Soissons	Shunsuke Takeuchi	Talon Warburton; Greg Whipple (singing)
Florian de Gerodelle	Takuya Eguchi	Daman Mills
Bernard Châtelet	Miyu Irino	Alejandro Saab; Jon Hall (singing)
Louis XVI	Fukushi Ochiai	Damien Haas
General Jarjayes	Banjō Ginga	J. Michael Tatum
Maron Glaicé Mont Blan	Mayumi Tanaka	Barbara Goodson
Madame Noailles	Fumi Hirano	Shelby Young
Louis XV	Hōchū Ōtsuka	Kiff VandenHeuvel
Rosalie Lamorlière	Saori Hayami	
Colonel d'Agout	Jin Yamanoi	
General Bouillé	Akio Otsuka	
Madame Jarjayes	Sumi Shimamoto	Shelby Young
Maximilien Robespierre	Kensho Ono	
Louis Joseph	Sora Tokui	
Marie Thérèse	Minami Tanaka	
Laselle	Atsushi Tamaru	
Jean	Daiki Yamashita	
Francois	Yūto Suzuki	
Pierre	Junta Terashima	
Henri de Guéméné	Wataru Takagi	
de Launay	Hironori Kondo	
Narrator	Hitomi Kuroki	Karen Strassman

== Production ==
In September 2022, plans for an animated adaptation of The Rose of Versailles were announced in celebration of the series' 50th anniversary. In July 2024, it was announced that MAPPA would produce the film, with Ai Yoshimura directing and Tomoko Konparu serving as screenwriter. Additionally, Miyuki Sawashiro was confirmed to voice Oscar, with Aya Hirano, Toshiyuki Toyonaga, and Kazuki Kato cast as Marie Antoinette, André Grandier, and Hans Axel von Fersen, respectively. By October, Shunsuke Takeuchi, Takuya Eguchi, and Miyu Irino joined the cast as Alain de Soissons, Florian de Gerodelle and Bernard Châtelet. One month later, the casting of Fukushi Ochiai as Louis XVI, Banjō Ginga as General Jarjayes, and Mayumi Tanaka as Maron Glacé Mont Blan was announced. Additional casting was announced shortly before the film's release.

=== Music ===
The soundtrack was composed by Hiroyuki Sawano and Kohta Yamamoto, with Sawano also composing the songs performed by the voice cast in the film. The English dub was the only one to adapt the songs to its language, as the others kept the Japanese audio.

No	Original title	English title	Characters
1	The Rose of Versailles	"The Rose or Versailles" or "May Our Souls Bloom in Love"	Oscar, Marie Antoinette, André, Fersen
2	Ma Vie en Rose		Marie Antoinette
3	Enchanting Masquerade		Masked nobilities
4	Our King and Queen		Parisians
5	Soul to Soul		Fersen
6	Resonance of Love		Marie Antoinette & Fersen
7	心の在り処 (Kokoro no arika)	Nowhere Heart	Oscar
8	Believe in My Way		Oscar, Marie Antoinette, André, Fersen
9	Never surrender		Alain
10	Return to nothing		Oscar
11	Ravine		André
12	Child of Mars		Oscar
13	Anger and pain		Bernard, Parisians
14	夜をこめて (Yowokomete)	Before dawn comes	Oscar & André
15	Libération		-

"Libération" is performed by Japanese singer Tielle.

The film's theme song is "Versailles" performed by Ayaka.

== Release ==
The film was released in theaters in Japan on January 31, 2025. Netflix licensed the film, and released it on its platform on April 30, 2025.

== Reception ==
=== Box office ===
The film debuted at number 9 out of top 10 in the Japanese box office in its opening weekend.

=== Critical reception ===
Richard Eisenbeis of Anime News Network gave the film a B+ rating, and stated "Watching this new adaptation of The Rose of Versailles, it's easy to see why this story captivated audiences five decades ago, and still does even today."

=== Accolades ===
At the 10th Crunchyroll Anime Awards in 2026, The Rose of Versailles was nominated for Film of the Year.
