= Natsuki Mizu =

Natsuki Mizu (水夏希 Mizu Natsuki, born 1972) is the former top star (otokoyaku) for Snow Troupe of Takarazuka Revue from December 24, 2006 to September 12, 2010. She joined the company in 1993 and became the top star in December 2006 upon the resignation of Hikaru Asami.

She is from Chiba-shi, Chiba-ken and her birthday is August 16.

Her nickname is Mizu and Chika.

== Troupe history ==
- Moon Troupe: 1993–1997
- Flower Troupe: 1997–2001
- Cosmo Troupe: 2000–2005
- Snow Troupe: 2005–2010

== General information ==
Starting her career in the Moon Troupe, she is one of a few non-Senka members that have participated in the performances with all 5 troupes. She is one of several stars that were promoted in 1999 (along with Sumire Haruno, top star for Flower Troupe and Hikaru Asami, top star for Snow Troupe). Before she was promoted to top star, she was considered as one of top-stars-in-waiting along with Kei Takashiro, top star for Cosmos Troupe, Kei Aran, top star for Star Troupe, Jun Sena, top star for Moon Troupe, and Yūga Yamato, top star of Cosmos Troupe.

While she was in Moon Troupe, she took the title role of Me and My Girl of the first half of the New Actor Production in 1995. In 1996, she was in title role of CAN-CAN. Then she transferred to the Flower Troupe. Together with Sumire Haruno (class of 1991) and Jun Sena (class of 1992), they formed a trio among the younger performers in the Flower Troupe. During those years, she got praises for her performance on the leading role of Yoake no Jokyoku: her first leading role for New Actor production in Flower Troupe. Also she had her first leading show, Romeo and Juliet '99 at the Bow Hall (with Kanami Ayano, top musumeyaku) in 1999.

After participating the oversea performance at Berlin, Germany in 2000, she was transferred to Cosmos Troupe. With the establishment of the New Senka (in June 2000, the directors had made a change on the troupe structure by sending the second and third tier actresses of each troupe to the Senka, which served as the waiting list for top star of the troupes), she became the second man for Yoka Wao from 2002 to 2005. In her Cosmos years, she had memorable performance as both Oscar and Andre in Rose of Versailles, Robert in Pierre the Mercenary and villainous Count Edmond de Lambrouse in Lightning in the Daytime.

In 2004, she did the role of Tzeitel in the Japanese production of Fiddler on the Roof.

Marking the 90th anniverisery for the company, she had a special appearance for Snow production of Susano-o, where she was the antagonist Aosetona in 2004. Another noteworthy performance was her villainous role as Count Edmond. She also has a special appearance as Benito in Flower's La Esperanza with Hiromu Kiriya from Moon Troupe in the same year.

After performing Hotel Stella Maris for Cosmos Troupe in both Takarazuka Grand Theater and Tokyo Takarazuka Theater, she was suddenly transferred to Snow Troupe. With Kei Takashiro's promotion to top star for Cosmos Troupe, she became the second man for Hikaru Asami. In December 2006, she was finally promoted to be top star.

Her Grand Theater debut is Elisabeth in May 2007. This makes her the second top star to perform this musical of Takarazuka as her debut as a top star, after Sumire Haruno.

She was the leading member of the AQUA5, along with fellow troupe mates Mao Ayabuki, Kei Otozuki, Oto Ayana and Kaname Ouki. They had performed at the opening ceremony of 2007 World Championships in Athletics.

She has a twin sister, Yoko Masuda, who is an acupuncturist for Cirque Du Soleil.

== Notable performance and role ==
=== Moon New Actor era ===
- Me and My Girl - Bill (leading role shared with Kouki Naruse)
- CAN-CAN - Aristide Forestier (leading role)

=== Flower era ===
- Yoake no Jokyoku - Kawakami Otojirou (leading role in New Actor performance, her role in the formal performance is George)
- Asaki Yume Mishi - Genji Monogatari - Akashi No Onkata (female role)
- Romeo and Juliet '99 - Romeo (First leading performance at Takarazuka Bow Hall)

=== Cosmo era ===
- Rose of Versailles: Fersen and Marie Antoinette - Oscar François de Jarjayes
- Figaro! - Figaro / Antonio (Bow Hall performance)
- Calaf & Turandot - Barak
- Castel Mirage - Joe
- Pierre the Mercenary - Robert
- Legend of the Eight Dog Samurai - Inue Shinbei (Bow Hall performance)
- Lightning in the Daytime - Count Edmond de Lambrouse
- Romance de Paris - Rachid Salam (Special appearance for Snow Troupe, replacing Sakiho Juri at Nissan Theater)
- Susano-o - Aosetona (Special appearance for Snow Troupe)
- La Esperanza - Benito (Special appearance for Flower Troupe)
- Hotel Stella Maris - Allen Kendall

=== Snow era ===
- Milan Wrapped in Fog - Giambattista Salvatore
- Silver Wolf - Ray
- Rose of Versailles: Fersen and Marie Antoinette - Oscar François de Jarjayes (Special Appearance for Star Troupe, shared with Hiromu Kiriya, Yūhi Ōzora, Kei Takashiro and Hikaru Asami)
- Rose of Versailles: Oscar - Andre (shared with Wataru Kozuki, Sumire Haruno, Kei Aran, Jun Sena and Kei Takashiro)/Alain de Soissons/Oscar François de Jarjayes (National Tour)
- Lucifer's Tears - Jean-Paul Doret

=== Snow Top Star era ===
- Hoshikage no Hito - Souji Okita (Top Star debut)
- Elisabeth - Der Tod (Top Star debut at Grand Theatre)
- I love you －Je t'aime/Miroirs - George de Charette
- Side Story: The Rose of Versailles - Girodel/Miroirs - Victor-Clement de Girodelle
- Soromon no Yubiwa / Maripoosa no Hana - Nero
- Karamaazofu no Kyoudai - Dmitri "Mitya" Fyodorovich Karamazov
- Nishiki-e of the Wind / Zorro - The Masked Messiah - Don Diego de la Vega/ Zorro
- Russian Blue -Malleus Maleficarum- / Rio de Bravo!! - Albert Whistler
- Passionate Barcelona / Rio de Bravo!! - (National Tour) Marquis Francisco Laforet
- Daybreak at Solferino / Carnavale, A Sleeping Dream - Henri Dunant
- Roget / Rock On! - Roget Jardin

== A Note for Oscar ==
Rose of Versailles plays an important part for her Takarazuka career: because she is the very few that has been in both role of Oscar and Andre. The following list is her partners when she was in either role:

=== As Oscar ===
- Nao Ayaki as Andre in the 2001 Cosmo production
- Yoka Wao as Hans Axel Von Fersen in the same production as Ayaki
- Wataru Kozuki as Hans Axel Von Fersen in the 2006 Star production
- Kei Aran as Andre in the same production as Kozuki
- Kazuho Sou as Andre in the Snow National Tour

=== As Andre ===
- Nao Ayaki as Oscar in the 2001 Cosmo production
- Hikaru Asami as Oscar in 2006 Snow Production

Preceded by Hikaru Asami	Top Star (Otokoyaku) for Snow Troupe; 2007-2010	Succeeded by Kei Otozuki
