= Ayane Sakurano =

Japanese actress

- Born: Ayane Sakurano (桜乃 彩音); 11 July 1983 (age 41)
- Height: 1.63 m (5 ft 4 in)

Ayane Sakurano (桜乃 彩音, Sakurano Ayane) is a Japanese actress, formerly belonging on Takarazuka Revue's Flower Troupe, where she performed as a musumeyaku (actress specializing in female roles).

== Background ==
Sakurano is from Tsuyama. She made her debut in the revue in 2002, and, in 2006, became the first of her class to attain the status of top star. She was the third and the last top star partner of Sumire Haruno. She was the most senior among the five musumeyaku top stars.

== Troupe History ==
- Flower Troupe: 2002–present

== Notable Roles and Performances ==
=== Junior Cast ===
- Prague Spring (プラハの春, Puraha no Haru) (April, 2002) —
- Elisabeth (October, 2002) — Black Angel
- La Esperanza (August–November, 2004) — Tracy

=== Regular Cast ===
- Flute of the Meadow-wind (野風の笛, No-kaze no Fue) (May, 2003) — Sen-hime
- A Tale of Two Cities (October, 2003) — Lucie Manette (Bow Hall performance, starring Jun Sena)
- Season of Angels (2004) — Ambassador's Wife
- Dancer Child of Java (ジャワの踊り子, Jawa no odoriko) (May–June, 2004) — Amina
- Marrakesh: A Crimson Tombstone (マラケシュ・紅の墓標, Marakeshu: Beni no Bohyō) (March–July, 2005) — Olga O'Brien
- Kurawanka (2005) — Enyouhaku (Bow Hall performance, starring Ranju Tomu)
- Kurawanka (2005) — Ohatsu (Bow Hall performance, starring Aine Harei)
- Palermo Shines in the Setting Sun (落陽のパレルモ, Rakuyō no Parerumo) (November, 2005) — Henriette

=== Top Star ===
- Appartement Cinéma (March, 2006) — Anna; Top Star debut show
- Phantom (2006) — Christine Daae; Top Star debut show at the Grand Theater
- Passion of the Transient (うたかたの恋, Utakata no Koi) (2006) — Marie Vetsera
- Notebook of Kogorou Akechi — The Black Lizard - Madame Midorikawa (Black Lizard)
- Adieu Marseille (September–December, 1007) — Marienne
- Melancholic Gigolo - Felicia
- Love and Death in Arabia - Anoud
- Rose of Versailles Side Story: Alain - Diane
- The Legend - Kiha
- Sorrowful Cordoba - Eva Silvestre
- Me and My Girl - Sally Smith
- Rose of Versailles Side Story: Andre - Maryse
- Partners - Paris
