= Osse =

Osse may refer to:

- Osse, Doubs, a commune of the Doubs département, in France
- Ossé, a commune of the Ille-et-Vilaine département, in France
- Osse, Łódź Voivodeship (central Poland)
- Osse (river), a river in southwestern France
- Den Osse, a hamlet in the Netherlands
- Office of the State Superintendent of Education in the District of Columbia Public Schools system (Washington, DC)
- OSSE, Oriented Scintillation Spectrometer Experiment

== See also ==
- OS (disambiguation)
- Oss
- Ossa (disambiguation)
