= Aqua5 =

J-pop group

Aqua5 (often stylized as AQUA5) was a J-pop group affiliated with the Takarazuka Revue. When the group was formed, all five members were otokoyaku (performers of male roles) in the Revue's Snow Troupe. They made their debut on August 25, 2007, at the opening ceremony of the IAAF World Championships in Osaka, Japan.

The group has officially disbanded since April 2010 and their last appearance together was on the show Tokyo Friend Park 2 on 5 April 2010. It was noted on the show itself that it was to be their final appearance as a group. It was also mentioned in the Takarazuka Graph April 2010 issue in an interview with the five member that the article would be AQUA5's last job.

The group's name is based on part of Natsuki Mizu's name (水夏希), which translates to "water".

On June 9, 2009, the group had their first live concert, performing for 1300 fans in Akasaka, Tokyo. However, only four of the members participated, as Kaname Ouki had been recently injured in rehearsals.

== Members ==
- Natsuki Mizu (lead)
- Mao Ayabuki
- Kei Otozuki
- Oto Ayana
- Kaname Ouki

== Discography and releases ==
=== Singles ===
#	Title	Release date	Highest Oricon Ranking
1	Time to Love	November 21, 2007	40
2	Aqua Feel Aqua Soul	August 27, 2008	35
3	Shirayuki (シラユキ)	December 17, 2008	37

=== Albums ===
#	Title	Release date
1	Aqua5	March 18, 2009

=== DVDs ===
Title	Release date
Aqua5: Document Movie Since 2007	March 25, 2009
Aqua5 Concert	September 5, 2009

=== Television appearances ===
- NHK Kayo Concert - December 4, 2007
- Utaban - December 12, 2007; December 11, 2008
- Tokyo Friend Park 2 - February 23, 2009; April 5, 2010
