= Higanjima =

Japanese manga series

- First tankōbon volume cover

彼岸島
- Genre: Supernatural horror
- Manga
- Written by: Kōji Matsumoto
- Published by: Kodansha
- Magazine: Weekly Young Magazine
- Original run: November 2, 2002 – present
- Volumes: 101
- Series titles
- 1. Higanjima (2002–2010; 33 volumes); 2. Higanjima: Saigo no 47 Nichikan (2010–2014; 16 volumes); 3. Higanjima 48 Nichigo… (2014–present; 52 volumes)
Further information
Live-action film
Higanjima: Escape from Vampire Island
| Directed by | Kim Tae-kyun |
| Music by | Hiroyuki Sawano |
| Licensed by | NA: Funimation |
| Released | January 9, 2010 |
| Runtime | 122 minutes |
Television drama
| Directed by | Kenji Yokoi |
| Written by | Masaru Nakamura |
| Music by | Kōji Endō |
| Original network | MBS, TBS |
| Original run | October 24, 2013 – December 26, 2013 |
| Episodes | 10 |
Television drama
Higanjima Love Is Over
| Directed by | Akira Iwamoto |
| Produced by | Yasuyuki Fukasako; Toshihiro Satō |
| Written by | Kōji Matsumoto; Midori Satō |
| Music by | Kōji Endō |
| Original network | MBS, TBS |
| Original run | September 20, 2016 – October 11, 2016 |
| Episodes | 4 |
Live-action film
Higanjima: Deluxe
| Directed by | Takeshi Watanabe |
| Written by | Kōji Matsumoto; Sakichi Satō; Hidehiro Ito |
| Released | October 15, 2016 |
| Runtime | 117 minutes |
Manga
Kare, Kishijima
| Written by | Tarō Sasebo |
| Published by | Kodansha |
| Magazine | YanMaga Web; Comic Days |
| Original run | October 20, 2020 – present |
| Volumes | 4 |
- icon

Higanjima (Japanese: 彼岸島; lit. 'Island of Paramita') is a Japanese manga series written and illustrated by Kōji Matsumoto. It was serialized in Kodansha's seinen manga magazine Weekly Young Magazine from 2002 to 2010, with its chapters collected in 33 tankōbon volumes. A second series, Higanjima: Saigo no 47 Nichikan, was serialized in the same magazine from 2010 to 2014; a third series, Higanjima 48 Nichigo… started in 2014.

The series has spawned two live-action films; Higanjima: Escape from Vampire Island, premiered on January 9, 2010, and Higanjima: Deluxe, premiered on October 15, 2016. The first film was licensed for a home video release in North America by Funimation. Two television drama adaptations were broadcast in 2013 and 2016, respectively.

== Plot ==
When Akira Miyamoto learns that his older brother, Atsushi, is missing, his family begins to fall apart. The family business fails, and his father becomes an alcoholic. His two parents constantly compare Akira to Atsushi. Worse, Akira has a crush on a girl named Yuki, who already has a boyfriend, his friend Ken.

One day, Akira finds a girl unconscious in front of his house. The girl, Rei Aoyama, shows Akira Atsushi's ID card, claiming that Atsushi is alive. Rei explains that Atsushi is trapped on Higanjima Island, said to be inhabited by vampires. Akira invites his friends to help his brother, under the guise of a vacation to celebrate their graduation.

Upon arrival, vampires attack their boat and capture all of them except Rei. However, Akira escapes with his friends before vampires can drain their blood. On the island, he meets with Atsushi, who explains that the vampires are led by Miyabi, another vampire. Trained by Atsushi, Akira and his friends begin the battle against Miyabi and his vampire army in order to escape the island alive. Higanjima: Saigo no 47 Nichikan, set after the events of the original series, has Akira and his allies try to stop the invasion. Higanjima 48 Nichigo… showed the vampire invasion succeeded.

== Media ==
=== Manga ===
Written and illustrated by Kōji Matsumoto, Higanjima was serialized in Kodansha's seinen manga magazine Weekly Young Magazine from November 2, 2002, to July 12, 2010. Kodansha collected its chapters in 33 tankōbon volumes, released from April 4, 2003, to December 6, 2010.

A second series, titled Higanjima: Saigo no 47 Nichikan (彼岸島 最後の47日間), was serialized in Weekly Young Magazine from August 2, 2010, to July 28, 2014. Kodansha collected its chapters in 16 tankōbon volumes, released from January 6, 2011, and September 5, 2014.

A third series, Higanjima 48 Nichigo... (彼岸島 48日後…), started in Weekly Young Magazine on August 18, 2014. The first volume was published on December 5, 2014. As of January 6, 2026, 52 volumes have been released.

The first series was published in France by Soleil Manga. Taiwanese publisher Tohan translated all the three series into Chinese.

A gag comedy spin-off manga, titled Kare, Kishijima (彼、岸島), written and illustrated by Tarō Sasebo was serialized on the YanMaga Web website and the Comic Days app from October 19, 2020, to December 6, 2021.

=== Film ===
==== Cast ====
- Hideo Ishiguro – Akira
- Dai Watanabe – Atsushi
- Miori Takimoto – Yuki
- Tomohisa Yuge – Ken-chan
- Osamu Adachi – Nishiyama
- Asami Mizukawa – Rei
- Koji Yamamoto – Miyabi

=== Anime shorts ===
A short anime adaptation, titled Higanjima X, debuted on YouTube streaming service on October 15, 2016. On January 8, 2017, Multimedia Studio Tetra announced that Tomokazu Seki will voice all of the characters from episode seven through nine.

=== Television drama ===
A live-action television adaptation aired between October 24, and December 26, 2013, on MBS, and TBS. Starring Shunya Shiraishi as Akira, other cast members include Ryohei Suzuki, Rio Yamashita, Megumi Sato, Rui Kurihara, Yuya Endo, Shingo Tsurumi, and Yūga Yamato. The series was released on DVD on March 26, 2014. A sequel television series adapting Higanjima: Saigo no 47 Nichikan and featuring the same cast was announced in August 2014.

=== Video game ===
A video game adaptation of Higanjima was released in 2005 by Now Production for the PlayStation Portable.

== Reception ==
Mark Schilling of The Japan Times described the vampires as "not the sensitive heartthrobs of Twilight but vicious, ravenous types who revel in terror and torture." The film grossed $1,247,050 in Japan and $22,142 in Taiwan.
