= Ossa =

Ossa may refer to:

== Places ==
=== Greece ===
- Ossa, Larissa, a village in Larissa regional unit
- Ossa, Thessaloniki, a village in Thessaloniki regional unit
- Mount Ossa (Greece), also known as Kissavos
  - Ossa Cave

=== Poland ===
- Ossa, Opoczno County, a village in Łódź Voivodeship
- Ossa, Rawa County a village in Łódź Voivodeship
- Ossa, Masovian Voivodeship, a village

=== Elsewhere ===
- Lake Ossa, Littoral Province, Cameroon
- Mount Ossa (Tasmania), Tasmania, Australia
  - Mount Ossa National Park, Queensland, Australia

== People ==
- Albert Ondo Ossa (born 1954), a Gabonese politician
- Jorge Alberto Ossa Soto (born 1956), Colombian Roman Catholic archbishop

== Other uses ==
- Battle of Ossa, an 1863 battle near Ossa, Masovian Voivodeship
- Ossa (motorcycle), a Spanish motorcycle company
- Ossa (mythology)

== See also ==
- Osa (disambiguation)
- OSSA (disambiguation)
- Osse (disambiguation)
