= Oscar François de Jarjayes =

Fictional Japanese manga character created by Riyoko Ikeda

- Oscar in the anime adaptation of The Rose of Versailles
- First appearance: The Rose of Versailles vol. 1, "In the Waves of New Destiny" (1972)
- Created by: Riyoko Ikeda
- Voiced by: Japanese: Terumi Niki (Lupin the Third Part II); Reiko Tajima (1979 series); Miyuki Sawashiro (2025 film); English: Caitlin Glass (2025 film)
- Portrayed by: Catriona MacColl and Patsy Kensit in Lady Oscar; various actresses in live musicals (see below)

In-universe information
- Alias: Lady Oscar
- Gender: Female
- Title(s): Brigadier General; formerly Colonel, Commander
- Occupation: Commander of the Royal Guard, Commander of the Military Company B
- Spouse: André Grandier
- Relatives: François Augustin Regnier de Jarjayes (father); Hortense de la Lorancy (first older sister); Loulou de la Lorancy (niece)
- Nationality: Kingdom of France

Oscar François de Jarjayes (Japanese: オスカル・フランソワ・ド・ジャルジェ, Hepburn: Osukaru Furansowa do Jaruje) is a fictional character created by Japanese manga artist Riyoko Ikeda. She is the protagonist of the 1972 manga series The Rose of Versailles, and its various adaptations and spin-offs.

== Character history ==
Born 25 December 1755, the last of six daughters to the Commander of the Royal Guards, General François Augustin Regnier de Jarjayes (a real historical personage), she is raised by her father as if she were a boy in order to succeed him as the commander of the Royal Guard at the Palace of Versailles. Upon the completion of her military training at the age of fourteen, Oscar is tasked with protecting the Dauphine Marie Antoinette when she arrives at Versailles.

Despite being raised as if she were a boy and dressing in males' clothes, Oscar is open about being female. Even as she embraces her womanhood, she uses her male position to gain freedoms that she could never have as a lady of the court.

Her love interest is André Grandier, her servant at the Jarjayes mansion and afterwards a soldier in her regiment. She also earns the admiration and love of Rosalie Lamorlière, and in turn calls Rosalie her "spring breeze". Other women are infatuated with Oscar, even after she tells them she is female. She dislikes the court intrigues, but remains there out of loyalty to her father and her friend, Marie Antoinette. At one point, Oscar becomes infatuated with the Swedish aristocrat Hans Axel von Fersen, who has a forbidden love for Marie Antoinette.

Soon gaining the Dauphine and Queen-to-be's affection and trust, Oscar experiences life at Versailles and the pain caused by the contradictions of her being a woman whom everybody, including herself, considers a man.

Later in the story, Oscar learns of the political ideals of the French Revolution and that the royalist regime is corrupt. As violence erupts in Paris, Oscar renounces her status and her French Guards Regiment joins forces with the people marching to the Bastille. While leading an artillery bombardment of the fortress, Oscar is shot by the royal soldiers inside; she dies right before the Bastille falls.

== Development ==
Modeled after the revolutionary Pierre-Augustin Hulin, Oscar was originally a supporting character to Marie Antoinette and was created as a female because Ikeda was unsure if she could accurately portray a male soldier. However, Oscar eclipsed Marie Antoinette in popularity and due to reader feedback became the co-protagonist only until her death. Eri Izawa suggests that as Oscar is fictional, Ikeda could be freer in the portrayal of Oscar's life than Ikeda could be in the life of Marie-Antoinette, who had to die on the guillotine.

Oscar's androgynous persona is based on the actresses who play male roles in the Takarazuka Revue and Princess Sapphire, and she was named for Oscar Wilde, as Ikeda is a fan of his. The way Oscar is drawn has been regarded as a way of showing her androgyny: she is shorter than male characters, but taller than female characters, and her eyebrows are thicker than female characters but thinner than male characters – giving the effect of looking feminine when compared to male characters and masculine when compared to female characters.

== Actresses ==
Oscar portrayed by Catriona MacColl

In the Takarazuka Revue performances of The Rose of Versailles, Oscar has been played by several male-role actresses from 1974 to the present day. In the 1974 Moon Troupe performance, Yuri Haruna played Oscar. Mayo Suzukaze has played Oscar. Kei Aran and Hikaru Asami played Oscar in 2006.

In the 1979 anime adaptation of The Rose of Versailles, Oscar was voiced by Reiko Tajima.

In the 1979 film Lady Oscar, Oscar was played when a child by Patsy Kensit, and when adult by Catriona MacColl. MacColl's feminine and weak portrayal of Oscar was criticized, and it was felt that she was not androgynous enough to play Oscar.

In the South Korean musical of La Rose de Versailles, Oscar played by Ock Joo-hyun, Kim Ji-woo and Jung Yoo-ji (U.Ji) because most, if not all, large scale South Korean Musicals are generally double or triple cast for a role, the actresses share the role equally and alternate throughout the eight show week.

In the 2025 film, Oscar is voiced by Miyuki Sawashiro and Caitlin Glass.

== Reception ==
Oscar has been described as "iconic", as an archetype, "thrilling", and credited with the success of Rose of Versailles, as she illustrates the performative nature of gender. Ian Buruma and Deborah Shamoon consider that Oscar's politics are less important to the audience than her romances. Shamoon sees the Oscar-Andre relationship as very different from the Cinderella-Prince Charming stories which "dominated" shōjo manga in the 1960s, where the female protagonist would lose her identity to her boyfriend. Shamoon considers that the Oscar-Andre relationship follows the pattern of pre-war douseiai shōjo novels, which featured same-sex love between girls.

Kazuko Suzuki says that after RoV, "several works" were created with "nonsexual" female protagonists like Oscar, who realise their "womanness" upon falling in love. Suzuki sees her as being a transitional figure between the heterosexual romances of 1960s shōjo manga and those of shōnen-ai. Oscar's "gorgeous androgyny" has led to her being interpreted as belonging to the bishōnen – beautiful young men.

Oscar's relationship with Andre has been interpreted as being male-male, and Andre vows to die for Oscar if he needs to, like the Kabuki samurai. Oscar's conflict between her principles and her loyalty to Marie-Antoinette has also been compared with a "samurai who must be faithful to an unworthy master". Oscar has appeared in the Animage top 50 character list as recently as 1992.

Susan J. Napier described Oscar as a "truly complex and three-dimensional figure who offered young Japanese women a different kind of role model", citing her influence in Utena Tenjo of Revolutionary Girl Utena.

In 2007, a manga series called Shōjo Manga (series) was serialised in Chorus and was compiled into one volume. It told the story of an office lady who is inspired by the character of Oscar to defy her managers. It was adapted into a six episode TV series and renamed Haken no Oscar ~"Shōjo Manga" ni Ai o Komete, which aired starting from 28 August 2009. In the 1990s and 2000s, Oscar inspired Revolutionary Girl Utena and Le Chevalier D'Eon.

Anne Duggan describes Oscar as a "maiden warrior", a young woman who disguises herself as a man to take up arms and protect king and country, as in The Ballad of Mulan, Madame d'Aulnoy's Belle-Belle ou Le Chevalier Fortuné, or Marie-Jeanne L'Héritier's Marmoisan ou La Fille en garçon. At the close of the tale, the typical maiden warrior hangs up her sword. Duggan describes Oscar as a case where the maiden refuses to put away her sword, and fights against the order that she was supposed to defend. Oscar's masculinity is central to her character, unlike in the earlier maiden warrior tales, and Oscar also helps usher in a permanent change to French society by supporting the French Revolution.

== Crossover ==
Oscar makes a crossover appearance in the Lupin the Third Part II episode "Versailles Burned with Love", in which Oscar recruits Lupin in helping her steal the crown of Marie Antoinette. The series is mentioned as a frame of reference for the Rose Knights in the light novel series Gate: Jieitai Kano Chi nite, Kaku Tatakaeri.
