= OSSA =

OSSA as an acronym may refer to:

- Office of the Special Adviser on Africa, a United Nations initiative
- Organizational Systems Security Analyst, an information security certification
- Star of South Africa, Officer, a non-military class of the Order of the Star of South Africa

== See also ==
- Ossa (disambiguation)
