= Osa, Russia =

Osa (Russian: Оса) is the name of several inhabited localities in Russia.

== Urban localities ==
- Osa, Perm Krai, a town of district significance in Osinsky District of Perm Krai

== Rural localities ==
- Osa, Irkutsk Oblast, a selo in Osinsky District of Irkutsk Oblast
- Osa, Kirov Oblast, a village in Makaryevsky Rural Okrug of Kotelnichsky District of Kirov Oblast
