= Osa, India =

Village in Allahabad, Uttar Pradesh, India

Osa is a village in Prayagraj district, Uttar Pradesh, India. It falls under the Karchhana tehsil, & Post Office Kaundhiyara and is part of the Bara Vidhan Sabha constituency. According to the 2011 Census, the village code of Osa is 162063, and its PIN code is 212301. Osa is located approximately 20 km from the sub-district headquarters in Bara and 40 km from the district headquarters in Prayagraj. As of 2019, Osa is also a Gram Panchayat.

The village spans 334.92 hectares and has a population of 1,254 residents, comprising around 191 households. The nearest town, Kaundhiyara, is approximately 5 km away.

Osa has road connectivity to nearby areas; however, public transportation remains a challenge.
