= Sumire Haruno =

Japanese actress

- Born: Masako Osada; 15 December 1972 (age 53); Komae, Tokyo
- Other names: Osa, Masa-chan
- Citizenship: Japan
- Occupation: actress
- Organization: Takarazuka Revue

Sumire Haruno (春野寿美礼, Haruno Sumire) (born 15 December 1972) is a Japanese actress from Komae, Tokyo, a former member of Takarazuka Revue, specializing in otokoyaku. She joined the revue in 1991, became the top star of Flower Troupe in 2002 and resigned from the company in 2007. Her real name is Masako Osada (長田雅子 Osada Masako). Her nicknames are Osa and Masa-chan (as called by Jun Sena). She is the first otokoyaku of her class (77th) to reach the top star status (followed by classmate and former troupe-mate Hikaru Asami by 3 months). Her top star run is second longest in Flower Troupe history (66 months).

== Troupe History ==
- Flower Troupe: 1991–2007

== General information ==
Following the examples of Mira Anju, Miki Maya and Mire Aika she became the top star of the troupe she had always been with, without any troupe transfer (although Hibiki Takumi had almost all her Takarazuka career in the Flower troupe, she had been in Senka for 2 years before she became the top star of the Troupe.) Also, another uniqueness of her career is that her status of being the second man (ninbante) was a short-lived one, because Hibiki Takumi became severely ill with myelitis during the Grand Theater performance of "In the Amber-Hued Rain / Cocktail". Haruno took over the leading role for the Tokyo performance, and at that point she unofficially became the top star of the troupe. However, it is "Elisabeth" that is considered as her official top star début without top star overlap. With this production of "Elisabeth", she is the first top star to perform as Der Tod as her début.

Considered as the traditional type of otokoyaku, she is praised as one of the best singers along with other top stars, like Cosmos top star Asato Shizuki.

She was one of the promising young stars promoted by the company in 1999, along with Jun Sena, the top star for Moon Troupe; Hikaru Asami, the top star for Snow Troupe; Kei Takashiro, the top star for Cosmos Troupe; Kei Aran, the top star for Star Troupe, Natsuki Mizu, the top star for Snow Troupe and Yūga Yamato, the top star for Cosmos Troupe.

She had three top star partners - top musumeyakus Rei Ootori, Miyo Fuzuki and Ayane Sakurano, which is quite rare in an otokoyaku's case (Rio Asumi had four partners, although performed once with Hana Ranno and Yuuki Hana). She also had the second longest top star run, just after Rio Asumi.

She is formerly the face of the Mitsui Sumitomo Visa Card.

She maintains strong relationships with fellow stars and former troupe-mates, including Jun Sena, Hikaru Asami and Rira Maikaze. Fans frequently refer to Haruno and Sena as "Osa and Asa" (Japanese: オサあさ; lit. osa asa), nicknames derived from their real names.

In 2006, she had special appearance in the Snow production of Rose of Versailles, this was the first performance with classmate and former troupe mate Hikaru Asami since the troupe transfer for Asami in 1998, and was also the last given the resignation of latter.

She is the second star after Saki Asaji who has portrayed Der Tod from Elisabeth and Prince Rudolph from Mayerling, who was being attached to Der Tod in the previous musical. She also played both Der Tod and Elisabeth at some point.

She wanted to be a musumeyaku when she first entered Takarazuka. This story related to her classmate Mari Hanafusa: when Haruno went for the entrance exam of Takarazuka Music School, she saw another beautiful girl (Hanafusa) and thought about being a musumeyaku beside this beautiful girl.

== Notable Roles and Performances ==
=== New Actor Era ===
- Black Jack - Cain
- Kanashimi no Cordova - Vicente
- How to Succeed in Business Without Really Trying - J. Pierrepont Finch (leading role shared with Hiromu Kiriya)
- Hollywood Babylon - Arthur Cochran (her role in the formal performance is Peter Hunt)
- That's Revue - Harukaze Taihei (her role in the formal performance is Matsumoto)

=== Regular Cast Era ===
- Speakeasy - Bradley
- Ludwig II - Richard Hornig
- Asaki Yume Mishi - Genji Monogatari - Spirit of Time
- Michelangelo - Rafaello Sanzio
- Canary - Father Roblow
- In the Amber-Hued Rain - Louis Valentin

=== Top Star Era ===
- In the Amber-Hued Rain - Claude de Bernard (unofficial first leading role)
- Growing Purple Flower - Prince Naka no Ōe (official first leading role)
- Elisabeth - Der Tod (Grand Theater Top Star Debut)
- Immortal Thorns - Eri Makropoulos and Errol Maxwell
- A Flute Named Wind - Hanai Yoshio Mondonosho (with special appearance of Yū Todoroki)
- Season of Angels - Gustave and King Pescatore
- Java no Odoriko - Adinan
- La Esperanza - Carlos
- Hand Drum of Heaven, Nijihito
- Marrakech: The Crimson Gravestone - Ludwig
- Palermo Shines in the Setting Sun - Vittorio Rossi

Rose of Versailles: Maria Antonio and Fersen - Fersen

- Rose of Versailles (Special Appearance for Snow Performance) - Andre
- Apartment Cinema - Wolf
- Phantom - Phantom/Erik
- Mayerling - Rudolph
- Notebook of Kogorou Akechi - The Black Lizard - Kogorou Akechi
- Asaki Yume Mishi - Genji Monogatari - Hikaru Genji
- Adieu Marseille - Gerard (Last musical with Takarazuka)

=== Personal Concert ===
- Metamorphosis
- S (es)
- I Got Music
- Etude

=== After Takarazuka ===
2024: Cross Road ~The Devil's Violinist Paganini~ - Teresa Paganini
2012: Elisabeth - Elisabeth (2012 Toho production)
2011: DREAM TRAIL ~Takarazuka Legends~ (OG Performance)
2010: Funny Girl
2009: Solo Concert:「男と女 Un homme et une femme」
2009: Marguerite
2008: Christmas Dinner Show: Celebration
2008: First Concert: My Heart

Preceded by Hibiki Takumi	Top Star (Otokoyaku) for Flower Troupe; 2002-2007	Succeeded by Sei Matobu
