= Phantom (musical) =

Musical by Maury Yeston and Arthur Kopit

- Logo
- Music: Maury Yeston
- Lyrics: Maury Yeston
- Book: Arthur Kopit
- Basis: Gaston Leroux's novel The Phantom of the Opera
- Productions: 1991 Houston; Regional US productions International productions

Phantom is a musical with music and lyrics by Maury Yeston and a book by Arthur Kopit. Based on Gaston Leroux's 1910 novel The Phantom of the Opera, the musical was first presented in Houston, Texas in 1991.

Although it has never appeared on Broadway and has been overshadowed by the success of the 1986 Andrew Lloyd Webber musical, Yeston and Kopit's Phantom has received over 1,000 productions.

== Background ==
Yeston and Kopit had just finished the musical Nine, winner of the Tony Award for Best Musical in 1982, when in 1983 they were approached by actor/director Geoffrey Holder to write a musical based on Leroux's novel. Holder had obtained the rights to musicalize the novel in America from the Leroux estate, making Phantom the only Phantom of the Opera musical to do so. Holder planned to direct. Initially, Yeston was skeptical of the project. "I laughed and laughed.... That's the worst idea in the world! Why would you want to write a musical based on a horror story?.... And then it occurred to me that the story could be somewhat changed.... The Phantom would be a Quasimodo character, an Elephant Man. Don't all of us feel, despite outward imperfections, that deep inside we're good? And that is a character you cry for."

In 1984, British producer Ken Hill revived his 1976 musical Phantom of the Opera in England. This was not a big threat to Holder, Kopit and Yeston, since their musical was intended to play on Broadway. The real threat emerged when Andrew Lloyd Webber's The Phantom of the Opera became a smash hit in London in 1986. The novel was already in the public domain in Britain but would still be under copyright in United States for two more years, where Holder held the rights to it. Yeston had completed much of the score to Phantom, and Yeston, Kopit and Holder were in the process of raising money for a Broadway production when Lloyd Webber revealed plans to take his musical to Broadway. Subsequently, Yeston's Broadway investors backed out. Yeston, Kopit and Holder reluctantly shelved their plans for Phantom and went their separate ways for a time.

When Kopit saw the Lloyd Webber version of The Phantom of the Opera on Broadway, he realized that the approach he and Yeston had taken was fundamentally different and that it could still work on the musical stage. A few years later, Kopit wrote the NBC miniseries Hands of a Stranger, which was successful enough that NBC approached Kopit again. Kopit rewrote the script outline of his unproduced musical Phantom into a teleplay for a four-hour two-part miniseries entitled The Phantom of the Opera and sold it to NBC, with Yeston's blessing. It was filmed at the Opera Garnier, and the only music used was opera music. It starred Charles Dance, Teri Polo and Burt Lancaster and premiered on television in 1990. Kopit said, "I told Maury to hold on. Maybe someone would see the miniseries, think it would make a good musical we'd be ready."

The Yeston/Kopit musical was finally produced by Theatre Under The Stars (Houston) in 1991 under the official title Phantom. The piece has since received over 1,000 productions around the world. Yeston refers to Phantom as "the greatest hit never to be produced on Broadway." Yeston and Kopit's Phantom is more operetta-like in style than Lloyd Webber's, seeking to reflect the 1890s period in its score, and seeks to project a French atmosphere to reflect its Parisian setting. Its story offers a deeper exploration of the phantom's past and his relationship with Gérard Carrière, the head of the Opera House. The character Raoul does not feature at all in the story.

== Productions ==
Original production

In January 1991, Houston Texas's Theatre Under the Stars presented the premiere of the Yeston/Kopit musical, renamed simply Phantom to separate it further from Lloyd Webber's and other productions of Phantom of the Opera. Richard White starred in the title role. Members of the Houston cast recorded a cast album released by RCA records.

Early regional U.S. productions

That summer of 1991, Yeston and Kopit made a few cuts and changes to the musical. In the fall, the revised version was presented in Seattle and at the California Theatre of Performing Arts in San Bernardino California and was received warmly. In Chicago, Bill Pullinsi, Artistic Director of the Candlelight Playhouse staged the production, receiving rave reviews in publications including Variety and the Wall Street Journal. This led to other editions in other cities, including 1992 productions at Casa Mañana in Fort Worth, Texas, Seaside Music Theater in Daytona Beach, and at the Westchester Broadway Theatre in Elmsford, New York, starring Robert Cuccioli in the title role; and 1993 productions at Music Theater of Wichita (Kansas), Musical Theatre Southwest in Albuquerque, New Mexico and the Gateway Playhouse in Bellport, New York.

2007–2008 Westchester revivals

In October and November 2007, the show played at the Westchester Broadway Theater, in Elmsford, New York, and continued from December 2007 to February 2008, featuring Robert Cuccioli reprising the title role.

International productions

A 1993 Helsinki City Theatre (HKT), Helsinki, Finland, production was directed by Ritva Holmberg with choreography by Marjo Kuusela. The cast starred Sanna Saarijärvi as Christine, Oskari Katajisto as the Phantom, Kristiina Elstelä and Rea Mauranen alternately as Carlotta and Esko Nikkari as Gerard.

An Australian production ran in 1996 at Altona City Theatre in Victoria. A German-language version toured for three years in Germany.

A Japanese language run was produced by the Takarazuka Revue's Cosmos Troupe in 2004 (featuring Yoka Wao and Mari Hanafusa) and by its Flower Troupe in 2006 (featuring Sumire Haruno and Ayane Sakurano), 2011 (featuring Tomu Ranju and Hana Ranno) and in 2018 (featuring Fuuto Nozomi and Kiho Maaya). A Japanese production was staged in 2023 starring Kazuki Kato and Yu Shirota, double cast as the Phantom, and Kiho Maaya and sara double cast as Christine.

The musical was performed in Tallinn, Estonia in 2007.

A UK production of Phantom was staged at Ye Olde Rose and Crown Theatre Pub, Walthamstow, in 2013. It was directed by Dawn Kalani Cowle. The musical was staged in South Korea in Korean in 2015 at Chungmu Art Hall in Seoul, directed by Robert Johanson. The production was filmed at Seoul's Charlotte Theater in 2021 and released in select theaters with English subtitles in May 2022.

== Plot ==
The story begins at the time of the first meeting of Erik (the Phantom) and a street singer named Christine. Erik was born and raised in the catacombs under the Paris Opera House and needs beautiful music – he cannot exist without it. Complications arise when Gérard Carrière, the company manager, loses his position as head of the Opera house and therefore cannot protect Erik any longer. Furthermore, Carlotta, the new diva and wife of the new owner of the Opera, has such a terrible voice that the Phantom is in torment. His salvation must eventually come through Christine, whose voice is so beautiful that he falls in love with her. He accepts Christine as his pupil, training her for the opera, but forbids her to see his face. Erik's rival for Christine's affection is Count Philippe de Chandon, whose influence helps Christine get a minor job with the Paris Opera, but it is Erik's training that helps her earn a place as a member of the company. When Carlotta's jealous machinations ruin Christine's debut, Erik spirits Christine to his underground lair and later takes a terrible revenge by electrocuting Carlotta.

Carrière finds Christine and reveals an amazing secret: he is actually Erik's father. Emboldened by this revelation, Christine begs Erik to let her see his face, since his mother was able to look at him and smile. Reluctantly, he removes his mask (although the audience never sees his face), but Christine doesn't have the same fortitude and recoils in horror, causing Erik to go on a destructive rampage. Carrière helps the guilt-stricken Christine to escape, and later he returns to tell Erik the truth about their relationship. However, Erik has known all along that Carrière is his father and has only waited for Carrière to corroborate the fact. Erik fears that he will be captured and treated like a circus freak because of his horrendous face, but Carrière promises Erik that he will never be put on display. The police surround him, and Erik makes a failed attempt to swing to safety on a rope. With Erik dangling helplessly, the chief of police tells his men not to shoot because they "can take him alive!". Erik shouts out to his father for help. Carrière understands; he grabs a policeman's gun and aims at his son. Reluctantly, he fires, and the Phantom falls. Fatally wounded, Erik allows Christine to remove his mask. She now smiles and tells him "You are music, beautiful music, and you are light to me … you are life to me," and places the mask on him again as he dies.

== Principal roles and cast information ==
The Theatre Under the Stars cast is listed first:

- Erik, the Phantom: Richard White
- Christine Daaé: Glory Crampton
- Gérard Carrière: Jack Dabdoub
- Count Philippe de Chandon: Paul Schoeffler
- Alain Cholet (the new head of the Opera): Lyle Garrett
- Carlotta (his diva wife): Patti Allison (replaced by Meg Bussert on the recording)
- Joseph Buquet: Allen Kendall
- Inspector Ledoux: James Van Treuren

Other notable cast members in later productions:

- Erik, the Phantom: Robert Cuccioli
- Christine Daaé: Kristin Chenoweth

== Musical numbers ==
Act I

- Overture
- Melodie de Paris – Christine, Street Vendors and Prisienne
- Paris Is a Tomb – Erik and Acolytes
- Dressing for the Night – Open Company and First Nighters
- Where in the World – Erik
- This Place Is Mine – Carlotta
- Home – Christine and Erik
- The Music Lessons/Phantom Fugue – Erik, Christine, Carlotta, Cholet, Ledoux, Policemen and Opera Company
- You Are Music – Erik and Christine
- The Bistro: "Sing, Can You Sing!" – Waiters and Bistro Partygoers
- Melodie de Paris (Reprise) – Christine, Waiters, and Bistro Partygoers
- Who Could Ever Have Dreamed Up You? – Philippe and Christine
- This Place Is Mine (Reprise) – Carlotta
- Titania – Oberon, Christine, and Opera Company
- Where in the World (Reprise) – Erik

Act II

- Entr'acte
- Without Your Music – Erik
- Where In The World (Reprise) – Erik
- The Story of Erik – Carriere, Belladova, Young Carriere, Young Erik, and Company
- My True Love – Christine
- My Mother Bore Me – Erik
- You Are My Own – Erik and Carriere
- Finale: You Are Music (Reprise) – Christine

== Reception ==
The New York Times review opined: "Mr. Kopit's Phantom … is no less bravura than Lord Lloyd Webber's, but he is far more affecting. Mr. Yeston's sophisticated score is the model of how a loving assortment of classical forms can make popular theater music bloom. Mr. Yeston's music charms and effervesces, valuing melodiousness and variety more than the extended leitmotif and endless bloated reprises." The News-Times reviewer commented: "song for song and story for story, Yeston's score is richer and more varied, and Kopit's book provides a convincing, touching and resolved narrative that tops Webber's ambiguous ending."

The Los Angeles Times reviewer wrote: "There is a lot more understanding of Erik than of Lloyd Webber's more furtive phantom, but also less mystique. Kopit puts in details Leroux never imagined." Peter Scott-Pressland felt, in reviewing the London production, that "as a piece of writing, Yeston's Phantom is altogether more engaging than ALW's. It is tighter, more intimate and informed by more human sympathy. ... While it doesn’t produce the kind of melodic sweep and glamour of ALW, it rises … in the second act to genuine emotional fervour. … Erik is altogether more engaging and believable than the Lloyd-Webber skulker." He stated that this makes the Beauty and the Beast theme "credible and agonizing", and that the father-son theme is even more "moving in the agony of both loving and loathing the thing you have spawned."
