= Jun Sena =

Asako Doi (土井麻子, Doi Asako; born April 1, 1974), known professionally as Jun Sena (瀬奈じゅん, Sena Jun), is a Japanese actress and former top star of the Takarazuka Revue's Moon Troupe. During her time in the Revue, she was an otokoyaku, an actress who specializes in male roles. After two years of intensive training at the Takarazuka Music School, she joined the revue in 1992 and reached top star status in 2005. Her nicknames are Asa and Asako. The first otokoyaku from her class of 1992 to reach top star status, she resigned her position as top star and retired in 2009 after the run of Last Play / Heat on Beat and is now pursuing an acting career outside of the Revue.

== Troupe history ==
Sena entered the Takarazuka Music School in 1990 and graduated in 1992. Upon graduation, she was placed in the Revue's Flower Troupe. During her time in Flower Troupe, she had one shinjinkouen (performance for junior troupe members) lead, and also had the lead role in two performances at Takarazuka Bow Hall. In 2002, she had her first lead role as a female character when she performed as Scarlett O'Hara opposite Yu Todoroki's Rhett Butler in an adaptation of Gone with the Wind.

As part of the Revue's 90th anniversary celebration in 2004, Sena made a special appearance in a Moon Troupe performance. She was also selected to portray the title role in the 2005 Moon Troupe production of Elisabeth. Although Sena was never officially transferred into Moon Troupe for these two performances and appeared only as a special guest, she was named the next top star of the troupe in 2005. From that point on until her retirement from the Revue in 2009, Sena would remain a member of Moon Troupe.

== Biography ==
Sena was born and grew up in Suginami, Tokyo. As a three-year-old, she was in a car accident during which she tore her Achilles tendon. Her doctor suggested certain exercises were necessary for her recovery, so her mother enrolled her in ballet lessons.

Her stage name, Jun Sena, is a combination of ideas from her parents: Sena comes from Ayrton Senna, her father's favourite Formula One racing driver. "Jun" comes from Jun Ariake, a former vice troupe leader of Takarazuka's Moon Troupe, with whom her mother went to high school.

After attending Takarazuka Music School, she was promoted by the company in 1999, with Sumire Haruno, the former top star of Flower Troupe, and Hikaru Asami the former top star of Snow Troupe. Before she was promoted to top star status, she was considered as one of top-stars-in-waiting, with such other former Cosmos Troupe top stars Kei Takashiro and Yūga Yamato, former top star of Star Troupe Kei Aran, and former top star of Snow Troupe Natsuki Mizu.

In 2001, she had her first leading role in the Bow Hall production Manon. Her co-star in that production, Kanami Ayano, later became her top star partner. With the resignation of Mire Aika and Hibiki Takumi as top stars, Sena became a prominent figure in Flower Troupe. When Sumire Haruno became the top star of the troupe in 2003, Sena became the second man for Haruno.

Sena received much acclaim for two roles in 2003: Luigi Lucheni, from Flower Troupe's production of Elisabeth and Sydney Carton from A Tale of Two Cities.

In 2004, Sena and classmate Kei Takashiro, who was then a member of Snow Troupe, were invited into the cast of Moon Troupe's production of The Glow of Sunset in Asuka. The pair, with classmate Yūhi Ōzora, had prominent roles in the show. From that time on, Sena was unofficially transferred to Moon Troupe, though officially she was still a member of Flower Troupe. She is the third top star for Moon Troupe that is originally from Flower Troupe and one of two stars that portrayed a female role before becoming an otokoyaku top star.

With the resignation of Nao Ayaki in 2005, Sena became the top star of Moon Troupe with Kanami Ayano as her partner. Their debut performance was Ernest in Love, and their début at the Grand Theater was in Jazzy Fairies.

== Versatility ==
Sena is famous for her portrayal of a series of such strong male characters as Luigi Lucheni, Sydney Carton and Jack Worthing. However, she also received praise for her female roles, such as Scarlett O'Hara in the Flower Troupe production of Gone with the Wind in 2002 and Elisabeth of Bavaria in the Moon Troupe production of Elisabeth in 2005.

Although an otokoyaku usually has a deep voice, her voice is versatile enough to allow her to sing in both the male and the female ranges without any difficulties.

== Notable Performances and Roles ==
=== Flower Troupe appearances ===
- Speakeasy - Macheath (New Actor Show lead)
- Manon - Rodrigo (first leading performance at Takarazuka Bow Hall)
- Gone with the Wind - Scarlett O'Hara
- In the Amber-Hued Rain - Michel de Plaire (Grand Theater) / Louis Valentin (Tokyo)
- Elisabeth - Luigi Lucheni
- Immortal Thorns - Albert
- A Tale of Two Cities - Sydney Carton
- Akanesasu Murasakino Hana - Prince Ōama

=== Flower-Moon performances ===
- The Glow of Sunset in Asuka - Nakatomi no Kamatari/Prince Karu
- Elisabeth - Elisabeth

=== Moon Troupe Top Star performances ===
- Ernest in Love - Jack Worthing (Top Star debut)
- Jazzy Fairy - Patrick Gale (Top Star debut at Grand Theater)
- Rose of Versailles (special appearance in Snow Troupe performance) - Andre
- Rome at Dawn - Marcus Junius Brutus (with special guest star Yū Todoroki)
- Akanesasu Murasakino Hana - Prince Ōama
- Higher Than the Sky of Paris - Armand Jacquet
- Love at Dal Lake - Hachiman
- The Magician's Melancholy - Champsdor
- A-“R”ex - Alexander the Great
- Me and My Girl - Bill
- Elisabeth - Der Tod
- Last Play - Alistair

=== After Takarazuka ===
- Fun Home (2018), Allison
- Hairspray (2020), Velma Von Tussle

=== Film ===
- April Come She Will (2024), Takahashi

Preceded by Nao Ayaki	Top Star (Otokoyaku) for Moon Troupe; 2005–2009	Succeeded by Hiromu Kiriya
