= Yūga Yamato =

Japanese actress (born 1977)

Yūga Yamato (大和 悠河)
- Kaoru Tanioka (谷岡薫)
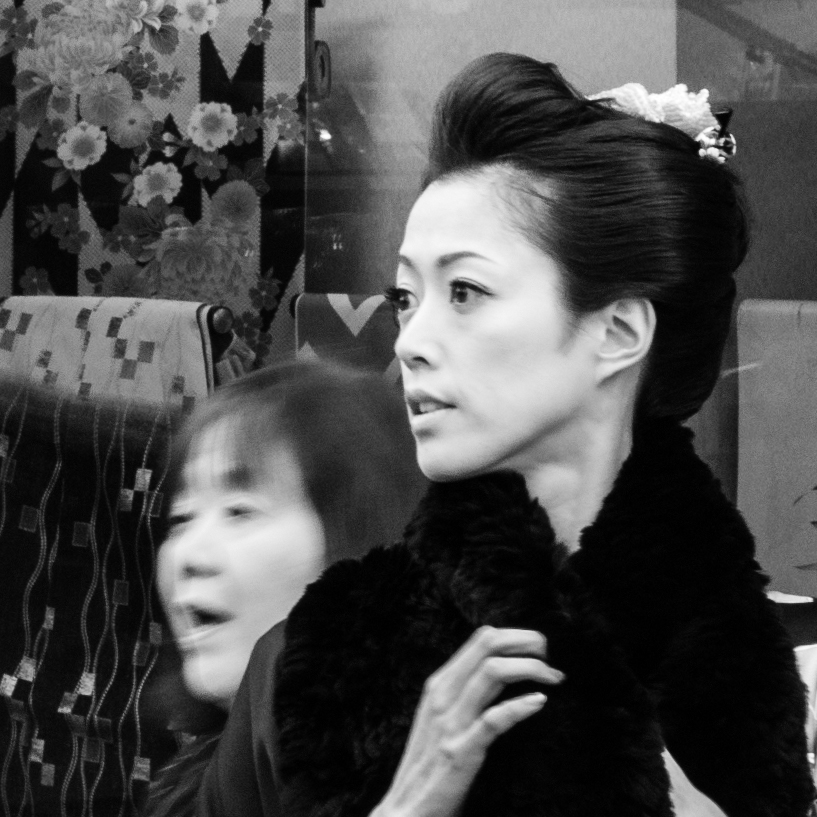
- 2015 Hagoita market, Asakusa
- Born: August 4, 1977 (age 49); Bunkyō, Tokyo, Japan
- Years active: 1995 – Current
- Height: 169 cm (5 ft 7 in)
- Website: http://www.yuga-yamato.jp/

Yūga Yamato (大和 悠河, Yamato Yūga) (born August 4, 1977) is a former otokoyaku (a female playing a male part) for Cosmos Troupe of Takarazuka Revue. She joined the company in 1995 and became the top star in February 2007 upon the resignation of Kei Takashiro, which made her the first otokoyaku to be top in her class. She resigned from the company in July, 2009, and is currently pursuing a stage career.

She is from Bunkyō, Tokyo.

== Troupe history ==
- Moon Troupe: 1996–2003
- Cosmos Troupe: 2003–2009

== Biography ==
Yūga Yamato began her career in Takarazuka in 1995. She was one of the young stars that were promoted by the company in 1999 (along with Sumire Haruno, the former top star for Flower Troupe and Hikaru Asami, the former top star for Snow Troupe). Before she was promoted to top star, she was considered as one of top-stars-in-waiting along with Kei Takashiro (the former Cosmos Troupe top star), Kei Aran (the former Star Troupe top star), Jun Sena (the former Moon Troupe top star), and Natsuki Mizu (the former Snow Troupe top star).

Even when she was in her underclassman years, she was already in some roles that were quite inside the nuclear cast of the regular cast production. Along with Yūhi Ōzora and Hiromu Kiriya, they were the major trio for the young batch in Moon Troupe. When the trio were still underclassmen, they were always cast in the title roles for the new actor production alternatively.

When Jun Shibuki became the top star for Moon Troupe, she became the second man (nibante) for Shibuki. In 2003, she was transferred to Cosmos Troupe, rejoining Natsuki Mizu, former troupe mate from Moon Troupe. It seemed that she had been downgraded for the role of Rolan Sabatier (considered a role for a third-tier actor) in Lightning in the Daytime. But it was proven wrong when she took on the role of Barak in Calaf & Turandot in the Hakataza Theater performance (replacing Natsuki Mizu who had a Bow Hall performance at the same time). In the same year, she went on stage with Kei Aran of Star Troupe for Singin' in the Rain.

Same as Natsuki Mizu, she had a special appearance in 2004 for the Star Troupe in A Love Story in 1914 and Ch'Ang-an: Full of Swirling Flowers (replacing Kei Aran in the Hakataza Theater performance). Also, got her solo lead performance The Last Party: S.Fitzgerald’s Last Day at Bow Hall.

In 2005, with the sudden troupe transfer for Natsuki Mizu, she became the solo second man for Yōka Wao. With the resignment of Yōka Wao and her successor Kei Takashiro, she became the fourth Cosmos top star (the youngest troupe in the company), and the youngest of the five.

In 2013, she starred in the Sera Myu revival as Tuxedo Mask, and made her TV drama debut in the series Higanjima.

== Notable performances and roles ==
- Me and My Girl - Gerald
- Descendant of Baron - Henry
- El Dorado - Ignacio (first lead role)
- West Side Story - Tony (lead role shared with Yūhi Ōzora, her role in regular cast is A-Rab)
- Dark Brown Eyes (An adaptation of The Captain's Daughter) - Nicolai (lead role)
- The Prisoner of Zenda - Count of Hentzau (her role in regular cast is Anthony)
- Great Pirates - Emilio (lead role; this is her final participation for new actor production)
- Fake Love - Michael (Bow Hall production starring Asato Shizuki)
- Twelfth Night - Duke Orsino (Bow Hall production)
- Practical Joke - David
- Great Pirates - Rockwell/Edgar (replacing Wataru Kozuki for the national tour)
- Guys and Dolls - Nathan Detroit
- At the End of a Long Spring - Brice
- Singin' in the Rain - Cosmo (Starring Kei Aran of Star Troupe, may consider as special appearance)
- Calaf & Turandot - Barak (replacing Natsuki Mizu in the Hakataza Theater performance)
- Lightning in the Daytime - Rolan Sabatier
- A Love Story in 1914 - Amedeo Modigliani (Special appearance for Star Troupe)
- Ch'ang-an, Full of Swirling Flowers - An Lu-shan (Special appearance; replacing Kei Aran in the Hakataza Theater performance)
- The Last Party: S.Fitzgerald’s Last Day - Scott Fitzgerald (Bow Hall Production)
- Hotel Stella Maris - Guy Prescott/Allen Kendall (National Tour)
- A Kiss to the Flame - Barria
- Never Says Goodbye - Vincent Romero
- Sketches from the Life of Ryoma Sakamoto - Shintaro Nakaoka
- A/L: The Youth of Phantom Thief Lupin - Arsène Lupin (Top Star Debut)
- Hot Flower of Valencia - Fernando Delvarez (Top Star Debut at Grand Theater)
- Dawn Wind - Douglas MacArthur
- Singin' in the Rain - Don Lockwood
- Paradise Prince - Stuart Green Menfield
- Gaiden - The Rose of Versailles: André - André Grandier
- Higanjima - Asuka
- Kaitō Queen wa Circus ga Osuki (Mirage Queen Aime Cirque) - Queen (voice role)

Preceded by Kei Takashiro	Top Star (Otokoyaku) for Cosmos Troupe; 2007-2009	Succeeded by Yūhi Ōzora

Preceded by Gyo Miyamoto	Mamoru Chiba/Tuxedo Mask in Sailor Moon Musicals; 2013-2017	Succeeded by Mikako Ishii
