= Hikaru Asami =

Japanese actress

- Born: January 24, 1972 (age 54); Sendai, Miyagi, Japan
- Occupation: actress
- Years active: 1991-Now
- Spouse: Masayuki Sakamoto (m. 2021)

Hikaru Asami (朝海 ひかる, born January 24, 1972) is a Japanese performing artist and a former member of the Takarazuka Revue, where she specialized in playing male characters (Otokoyaku). She joined the revue in 1991 and resigned in 2006. She is from Sendai-shi, Miyagi-ken.

Her real name is Noriko Komuro (小室 德子) and her nickname is Komu (comes from the last name Komuro).

== Troupe history ==
- Flower Troupe: 1991–1997
- Cosmos Troupe: 1998–1999
- Snow Troupe: 1999–2006

== General information ==
As one of the founding members of Cosmos Troupe, she had given a performance as Prince Rudolf in the 1999 Cosmos production of Elisabeth with Asato Shizuki as Der Tod. However, she was transferred to Snow Troupe right after the Takarazuka performance and the role was taken by Sakiho Juri in the Tokyo performance.

While she was in Snow Troupe, she teamed up with classmates Kei Aran and Kouki Naruse, and the three had a performance at the Bowhall as The Wonder Three. Even though such a trio within the younger group could be found among the Flower Troupe (Haruno, Sena and Mizu) and Moon Troupe (Ōzora, Kiriya and Yamato), they were the only trio that was considered official. This trio was also the major cast for the special performance of Arch of Triumph, which is the first case (and is the only one up to the date) for Takarazuka to have 3 versions of the cast (a major cast led by Yu Todoroki, a new actor cast and the special cast led by Asami herself) for one performance.

Other than male roles, she also had performed in two female roles during her Takarazuka career: Yan-Gai Fan from Singing in the Midnight and Scarlett O'Hara from Gone with the Wind.

Upon the resignation of her predecessor Yū Emao she became the top star of the Snow Troupe with Rira Maikaze, a former fellow troupe member from Flower Troupe, by the reprise of Meet Again (in which the title role was played by Yu Todoroki, one of the legends of the company, in the 1999 reprise).

In 2006, when the Star Troupe and Snow Troupe reprised Rose of Versailles (while Star performed the arc of Fersen and Marie Antoinette and Snow performed the arc of Oscar and Andre), she once again performed with a couple former troupe mates from Flower (Haruno and Sena), Cosmos (Wataru Kozuki) and Snow (Kei Aran) on the same stage.

After resignation from the company, she had her first concert (Primary Colors) at Tokyo and Hyōgo in May 2007.

On December 30, 2021, she announces her marriage with former V6 member, Masayuki Sakamoto.

== Notable Performance and Role ==
=== Takarazuka Era ===
==== Flower New Actor Era ====
- Black Jack - The shadow of Black Jack
- How to Succeed in Business Without Really Trying - Bud Frump (act two)
- Hollywood Babylon - Eliott Walker
- Blue Swan - Julian

==== Cosmos Era ====
- Excalibur - Paul
- Elisabeth - Rudolph

==== Snow Era ====
- Meet Again - Jan
- Lovers' Suicide - Hachiemon Tanbaya (starring Kou Shiokaze)
- Say It Again - Proteus (co-starring with Kouki Naruse)
- The Man Called Bacchus - Lazlo
- Arch of Triumph - Rosenfeld (regular cast)/Ravic (special cast)
- Singing in the Moonlight - Yan-Gai Fan (female lead, starring Wataru Kozuki)
- In Search of El Dorado - Yatarou Yajima
- Anna Karenina - Alexei Kirillovich Vronsky (Last leading performance before being top star)
- Flaming Love - Feng Wu
- Gone with the Wind - Scarlett O'Hara (female lead, starring Yu Todoroki)
- Memories of Barcelona - Roberto

==== Snow Top Star Era ====
- Meet Again - Gerard (repraise, top star debut)
- In the Tender Light of a Fine Spring - Yasusuke Fujiwara/Yasumasa Fujiwara (top star debut at Grand Theater, two roles)
- Romance de Paris - Vincent Chevalier
- Susano-o - Susano-o
- Ano Hi Mita Yume ni - Michael
- In Quest of the Blue Bird - Vincent McNorton (with special appearance of Yu Todoroki)
- Nemureru Tsuki - Hamamatsu Chunagon
- Milan Wrapped in a Fog - Lorenzo Croce
- Silver Wolf - Silver
- Rose of Versailles - Fersen and Marie-Antoinette - Oscar (shared with Natsuki Mizu, Kei Takashiro, Yūhi Ōzora and Hiromu Kiriya for Star special appearance)
- Rose of Versailles - Oscar and Andre - Oscar
- Lucifer's tears - Lucifer (last show with Takarazuka)

==== Personal Concert ====
- The Wonder Three
- Dancer in the Dark
- Mannish
- Albatross, Go South (Bow Hall Special)

=== Performance after Takarazuka ===
==== Concert ====
- Primary Colors

==== Stage ====
- Kiss of the Spider Woman - Aurora
- Dancin' Crazy
- Elisabeth - Elisabeth (shared role with Mayo Suzukaze) 2008–2009
- Cyrano - Roxane 2009
- Anastasia - Countess Lily (shared role with Marcia and Keiko Horiuchi) 2020

Preceded by Yu Emao	Top Star (Otokoyaku) for Snow Troupe; 2003-2006	Succeeded by Natsuki Mizu
