= List of The Rose of Versailles characters =

This is a list of characters from The Rose of Versailles, a shōjo manga created by Riyoko Ikeda which centers on the main character, Marie Antoinette, while the anime is about Oscar François de Jarjayes. Most of the characters are based on French historical personages.

== Main characters ==
=== Marie Antoinette ===
Marie Antoinette (マリー・アントワネット, Marī Antowanetto) is the main character in the manga, while in the anime is the third protagonist after Oscar and André. She married the Dauphin to seal the alliance between his grandfather Louis XV and her mother, Empress Maria Theresa of Austria, when she was 14. After her marriage, she realizes that Madame du Barry, King Louis XV's mistress, is against her. The princess, horrified by what she had heard about du Barry, decides to never speak to her. Meanwhile, she meets Count von Fersen, who becomes her lover.

Madame du Barry, always plotting against Marie Antoinette and Oscar, fulfills her desire to be greeted by her. After the death of Louis XV, Madame du Barry is forcibly removed from Versailles and sent to a convent.

Marie Antoinette, after several conflicts with her husband, starts feeling lonely. Fersen, who had left France on Oscar's advice, returns. Rumors swirl about the Queen and the Count, and Fersen leaves again. A depressed Marie Antoinette befriends the Duchess de Polignac. Polignac leads Marie Antoinette to her downfall.

Marie Antoinette is described as a "lively, silly girls of shoujo manga". She has been played by Yuri Shirahane in the Takarazuka Revue musicals.

=== Oscar François de Jarjayes ===
Illustration by Riyoko Ikeda, featuring Oscar and André.

Oscar François de Jarjayes (オスカル・フランソワ・ド・ジャルジェ, Osukaru Furansowa do Jaruje) is the main protagonist in the anime, while in the manga temporarily became the co-protagonist only until her death. She is a beautiful woman who was raised as a boy by her father. She is educated in such diverse arts as fencing. Eventually, she commands the Royal Guard of Marie Antoinette. She has no reason to pretend to be a man because most of those at Versailles know that she is a woman. Oscar falls in love with Hans Axel von Fersen, a Swedish count. But Fersen has eyes for Marie only, and treats Oscar like a friend without knowing her true feelings for him. When the revolution begins, André tells Oscar that he loves her, and she realizes that she loves him too. Oscar gets shot and dies. She is modeled after the revolutionary Pierre-Augustin Hulin.

=== André Grandier ===
André Grandier (アンドレ・グランディエ, Andore Gurandie) is the male protagonist in the anime, while in the manga temporarily became an important character only until his death. He is the friend of Oscar and the grandson of her nanny, André and Oscar learned the arts of fencing and horsemanship together when they were children. As they grew up, Oscar became the Dauphine's guard and the class gap between them widened. He has been described as a "true working-class hero" by Helen McCarthy.

André is secretly in love with Oscar, but he never tells her until both of them decide to help the insurgents when the French Revolution begins. Oscar initially refuses his extreme advances, but later realizes she does not want to marry any other men for fear of hurting him, before realizing she also loves him back, but did not understand the nature of her love at first.

Later in the series, André loses sight in his left eye to save Oscar who had been captured by the Black Knight; his condition slowly worsens until he is completely blind. André is a very sensitive and passionate man, suffering for his unrequited love for Oscar but being unable to quench his desire for her and vocally siding with the commoners in their plight.

Oscar confesses her love to André a couple of weeks before the Storming of the Bastille. They eventually become "husband and wife" during a night spent together. On July 13th, André dies protecting Oscar from a bullet, fulfilling his promise that he would one day give up his life for her. Oscar joins him in death one day later.

=== Hans Axel von Fersen ===
Hans Axel von Fersen (ハンス・アクセル・フォン・フェルゼン, Hansu Akuseru fon Feruzen) is a handsome Swedish aristocrat who comes to the court of Versailles and becomes involved in a forbidden romance with queen Marie Antoinette. It is revealed in the series that Oscar also has strong feelings for Fersen.

=== Rosalie Lamorlière ===
Rosalie Larmolière as a noble lady.

Rosalie Lamorlière (ロザリー・ラ・モリエール, Rozarī ra Moriēru) is the adoptive daughter of a commoner named Nicole Lamorlière. She is described as "a stereotypical good girl, sweet, obedient and timid". Her biological mother is the Duchess de Polignac, referred to as Martine Gabrielle. Rosalie meets Oscar at age 12 while attempting to prostitute herself out of desperation. Her foster mother Nicole tells Rosalie the truth about her birth mother when she is dying after being hit by a carriage. Rosalie swears that she will kill the person in the carriage that killed her mother. She tries to kill Oscar's mother, Lady Jarjayes, because she thought Lady Jarjayes was in the carriage, but Oscar stops Rosalie. Oscar decides to help her, and she teaches Rosalie the art of fencing, manners, history, and other courtly skills. Rosalie comes to admire and love Oscar greatly.

Rosalie tells Oscar about Martine Gabrielle. At a party, Rosalie recognizes the Duchess de Polignac and tries to kill her, but Oscar stops her and tells her that killing her won't bring her mother back, and if she killed her, she would be executed. Later Oscar and André discover the true identity of Martine Gabrielle and her relationship to Rosalie.

Rosalie ambushes Polignac's carriage in front of Polignac's daughter, Charlotte, but Oscar stops her. After an incident where Charlotte loses her mind and commits suicide, the Duchess de Polignac goes to Jarjayes's Mansion and tells Rosalie that if she didn't come with her, she would tell the authorities that Oscar was the protector of the sister of Jeanne of Valois-Saint-Rémy, the mastermind of the "Affair of the Diamond Necklace". Rosalie decides to go; soon, she realizes that the Duchess de Polignac intends to marry her to the Duke of Guiche, Charlotte's ex-fiancé and cause of her suicide. She escapes, and marries Oscar's friend, Bernard Chatelet, and meets Oscar again during the Storming of the Bastille.

After the storming of the Bastille, the people burst into Versailles and take Marie Antoinette prisoner. Marie Antoinette and her family are taken to a prison, where Rosalie serves the queen as a servant, telling her all she knew about Oscar. Marie Antoinette, before the day of her execution, gives Rosalie a rose she made out of cosmetic paper, and tells her to paint it with Oscar's favorite rose color.

After The Rose of Versailles ends, she appears in its sequel, Eikou no Napoleon - Eroica.

Rosalie was unpopular amongst readers and her role was decreased.

== Minor characters ==
=== Royalty and nobility ===
==== Louis XVI ====
Louis XVI (ルイ16世, Rui Jūrokusei) is the later King of France and the grandson of Louis XV. He becomes King after his grandfather death, but he loves Marie Antoinette so much, so he doesn't change anything for France. Later, the revolution begins, he has been captured with his family, but later is freed. Unfortunately, he tries to escape out from France, with the help from Hans Axel von Fersen, but fails. He has been jailed, and later his family, including him, are executed. Marie Antoinette and Louis XVI had four children: Marie Therese, Louis Joseph, Louis Charles, and Sophie. Louis Joseph is the heir to the French throne. Rather mature for his age, he admires Oscar and wants to be the King of France to make the country better. However, he dies at age 7.

==== Louis XV ====
Louis XV (ルイ15世, Rui Jūgosei) is the King of France and grandfather of the Dauphin. He has a lover, Madame du Barry. He dies of smallpox in the Palace of Versailles. After his death, his heir and grandson becomes the King of France. The people of all the cities celebrate the birth of a new kingdom.

==== Madame du Barry ====
Madame du Barry (デュ・バリー夫人, Dyu Barī-fujin) was not born noble. She used to be a prostitute, and thanks to that she manages to enter into the court by becoming the lover of King Louis XV. When Marie Antoinette becomes princess of France, they become enemies. Maria Theresa of Austria, queen of Austria and mother of Marie Antoinette, sends her advisor, Comte de Mercy, to France. Mercy advises the princess to stop fighting with Du Barry, but Marie Antoinette does not obey the warnings until King Louis XV shows his displeasure with her attitude towards the countess. Marie Antoinette finally speaks to Du Barry. Months later, King Louis XV gets smallpox. Before dying, the bishop, hearing Louis's confession, and orders the removal of the King's sin, that is to say, Madame Du Barry. King Louis XV dies and Du Barry is taken to a convent, where she remains until 1793, the year in which she is guillotined.

==== Duke of Orléans ====
The Duke of Orléans (オルレアン公, Orurean-kō) is cousin of Louis XVI, who secretly tried to usurp the throne. Second in row to the throne of France. He is the mastermind in the plot to kidnap Marie Antoinette before she could marry prince Louis XVI, but after it failed thanks to Lady Oscar's intervention, he tried to kill the Prince and make it seem like an accident by switching the rifle Prince Louis XVI used for hunting with a tampered one that would explode once triggered. Later in the story, Duke de Orleans, because of his liberal ideas, lets anti-monarchists like the Black Knight (a masked French Robin Hood) and his followers secretly gather in his Palais Royale. He, masked, helped Jeanne of Valois-Saint-Rémy, the mastermind of the Affair of the Diamond Necklace, to escape from Pitié-Salpêtrière Hospital's prison to a convent. Then, he covered the expenses of the publication of the Jeanne memories, in which Marie Antoinette's visits to clandestine casinos with the Duchesse de Polignac, the "complicity" between the Queen and Lady Oscar and other rumours are started.

==== Duchess of Polignac ====
Gabrielle de Polastron, duchesse de Polignac (ポリニャック伯夫人, Porinyakku-hakufujin) is a singer of the Palace of Versailles, but she does not live there. Marie Antoinette listens to her and quickly makes her best friend. She impelled Marie Antoinette to bet in clandestine casinos, without the permission of Marie Antoinette's husband, King Louis XVI. She manipulated the queen for her own benefit and made the queen believe that lies would fix her difficult situations. Following her advice, Marie Antoinette lied and announced that the heir of France was on way. To remedy the situation, Polignac blamed the death of the heir on Lady Oscar. During the Revolution, she manages to flee with her family.

The Duchess has a daughter, Charlotte, who is traumatized by her mother's plan to marry her to the Duke de Guiche. Charlotte, not knowing what will happen to her, loses all reason, and commits suicide, jumping from one of the towers of the Palace of Versailles (or from the stairs in the manga). She dies without knowing that she had a half-sister named Rosalie.

==== Henri de Guéméné ====
Henri de Guéméné is a cruel, cold nobleman who resorts to violence and kills a young boy for a petty crime, appalling Rosalie, Oscar, and André.

==== The Count of Girodelle ====
The Count of Girodelle is Oscar's arranged fiancé, who treats Oscar only as a woman. To retaliate against him, she dresses in her uniform and dances with women at her engagement party, and the engagement is called off. Devoted to the monarchy forever, he is later become an immortal of the Poe Clan.

==== General Bouillé ====
General Bouillé

==== Colonel d'Agoult ====
Colonel d'Agoult is the deputy commander of the Company B, the troops assigned to Lady Oscar's service in the National Guard. He has always followed his commander, but as one of the nobles most devoted to the monarchy, when she betrays to join the people in revolt, he abandons the regiment and returns to Versailles. Oscar lets him go.

==== Loulou de la Lorancy ====
Loulou de la Lorancy (ル・ルー・ド・ラ・ローランシー, Rurū do ra Rōranshī) is the main character of Gaiden series. She is the only daughter of Hortense, Oscar's first older sister, born in Lorancy, Vendée. As her parents, she doesn't mind the differences of class, but is a royalist noble, devoted to the royal family. As a child, she didn't seem to be proud of her very curly hair, but during the revolution became a pretty young lady, similar to Oscar, which André didn't think was possible. Quick on the uptake, she is very versatile. She is very fond of a doll, which has the same name as her, made by her mother for her. At the age of six, often punished by her mother, she was entrusted to her maternal grandparents, so that they could prepare her for her debut in society. Queen Marie Antoinette would have loved to meet her, but Oscar is against it because that plague, to whom is deeply attached, would bring chaos to the Versailles palace. She knows very well that André is secretly in love with Oscar and takes the opportunity to tease him. She become a very good friend with Rosalie. She helps Oscar and André in their royal investigations, but also causes problems. After her maternal aunt's death for high treason against the crown, she returned to her parents, in that royalist region. However, with popular revolts even here after the flight to Varennes, thanks to Alain sent by Rosalie just in time, she and her parents emigrated from their relatives in Belgium, where they'll support the foreign countries against the revolutionary France.

=== Revolutionaries ===
==== Maximilien Robespierre ====
Maximilien Robespierre is the political leader.

==== Louis Antoine de Saint-Just ====
Louis Antoine de Saint-Just is the assassin.

==== Bernard Châtelet ====
Bernard Châtelet is Robespierre's follower. He has disguised as the Black Knight, and later marries Rosalie, and the pair survive the execution of Robespierre and Saint-Just. He and Rosalie along with Alain are also featured in Eikou no Napoleon – Eroica.

=== Third Estate ===
==== Alain de Soissons ====
Alain de Soissons is a military. After his father's death, he helped his mother to raise his beloved little sister Diane as much as he could, enrolling in the military. Diane committed suicide after her fiancé married a rich woman just days before their marriage.

Alain was the sergeant of the Company B, the troops assigned to Lady Oscar's service in the National Guard. He accepted Oscar at first, and even befriended André and smuggled him in the troops, but after learning the truth about her he violently rejected her leadership. Oscar had to fight him to win Alain and the group's respect back, since they refused to be ordered around by a noble. After losing to Oscar and begging her to save the life of a companion who was about to be executed, which she did, Alain forgave Oscar and became fiercely devoted to her, even falling in love with her in the manga; still, he knew he couldn't fight against her feelings for André.

Ultimately, Alain survives the French Revolution and the Terror, becoming a major character in Eikou no Napoleon – Eroica.
