= Wataru Kozuki =

- Born: June 28, 1971 (age 55); Iruma, Japan
- Occupation: actress
- Years active: 1989–present

Wataru Kozuki (湖月わたる, Kozuki Wataru; born June 28, 1971) is a Japanese performing artist and a former member of the Takarazuka Revue, where she specialized in playing male characters (Otokoyaku). She joined the revue in 1989 and resigned in 2006. She is from Iruma, Saitama.

She is the only Otokoyaku and the only student in her class to reach top star status. Also, she is the first otokoyaku top star who joined the company during the Heisei era.

== Troupe history ==
- Star Troupe: 1989–1997
- Cosmos Troupe: 1998–1999
- Superior Members: 2000–2002
- Star Troupe: 2003–2006

== General information ==
Kozuki is 174 cm tall. When she gained the top star status of Star Troupe, where she started her Takarazuka career, she became the tallest of top stars of the five troupes in 2003. Because of her height, she provided a strong male image on the stage. She progressed gradually after graduating from the New Actor Show cast. One of her notable roles in the 1990s is Lord Henry Wotton of The Picture of Dorian Gray. In 1997, she got her first Takarazuka Bow Hall show (Angels at Dawn).

One of the characteristics of her Takarazuka career is that she had participated in the most overseas performances among her generation: New York City in 1992, London in 1994, Hong Kong in 1998 and Seoul in 2005 (performing Rose of Versailles as a part of the celebration of the establishment of Japan-Korea relationship).

Upon the founding the Cosmos Troupe, she participated in her second production of Elisabeth in 1998 and got great applause with her portrayal of Luigi Lucheni (she played Elmer Batthyany in the 1996-7 Star Troupe production). In the 1998 production of Wuthering Heights, she had the role of Edgar in the previous Snow production, who later succeeded her to be the top star of Star Troupe). During the founding era of Cosmos, she got her second Bow Hall lead (The Tempest, as a part of Bow Shakespeare Series) in 1999.

During her Senka era, she participated in the production of Cosmos, Star, Snow and Moon. Also, she got a lead of show at the Tokyo special performance Singing in the Midnight (a production of Snow Troupe). Joining her as female lead was Hikaru Asami, a former troupe mate of Cosmos. When she participated in the Senka-Flower and Senka-Snow production of Gone with the Wind in 2002, she became the first to be in all five troupe productions in the company.

In 2003, she performed in A Song for Kingdoms (Takarazuka's own version of Aida), and in 2005 Rose of Versailles and Soul of Sheba in Korea. Too Short a Time to Fall in Love and Neo Dandyism! followed the next year, when she resigned from Takarazuka. Her first performance after the resignation, in the same year, was the Japanese production of Damn Yankees as Lola.

== Notable performances and roles ==
=== Takarazuka era ===
==== Star New Actor era ====
- I Won't Forget the Young Day's Song – Maki Bunshirou (First leading role)
- Casanova, Memento of a Dream – Casanova
- A Map Without Borders – Herman (Her role in regular cast is John Miller)
- The Story of a Sword, Love, and a Rainbow – Edmond

==== Star era ====
- Elisabeth – Elmer
- The Picture of Dorian Gray – Lord Henry Wotton (Bow Hall)
- The Spirit of the Samurai – Ryousuke Kuroda
- Angels at Dawn – Alvar (first Bow Hall leading performance)

==== Cosmos era ====
- Excalibur – Andrew/Christopher
- Elisabeth – Luigi Lucheni
- Wuthering Heights – Edgar
- Passion: Jose and Carmen – Escamillio
- The Tempest – Ferdinand
- Black Rose of the Desert – Zelim
- Mayerling – Archduke Jan Salvador

==== Senka era ====
- Gone with the Wind (Senka-Snow & Senka-Flower) – Ashley Wilkes

===== With Cosmos Troupe =====
- Nostalgia Across the Sea – Akizuki Kuroudo
- Castel Mirage – Richard Taylor (only at Grand Theater)

===== With Moon Troupe =====
- Great Pirates – Edgar (only at Tokyo)
- At the End of a Long Spring – Claude

===== With Snow Troupe =====
- Singing in the Moonlight – Lui Man-fu (leading)
- In Search of El Dorado – Soujirou Gotou

===== With Star Troupe =====
- Rose of Versailles – Andre

==== Star Top Star Era ====
- A Song for Kingdoms (Takarazuka's own version of Aida) – Radames (Top Star Debut at Grand Theater)
- Eternal Prayer: The Revolution of the World of Louis XVII – Louis
- Butterfly Lovers/ Southern Cross III – Yukiwaka
- A Love Story in 1914 – Aristide Bruant
- Ch'ang-an, Full of Swirling Flowers – Hsan Tsung
- Shigure Hill Road in Nagasaki – Unosuke
- Rose of Versailles – Fersen and Marie-Antoinette – Hans Axel Von Fersen
- Rose of Versailles – Oscar and Andre – Andre (Special appearance for Snow Troupe)
- Copacabana – Stephen/Toni Forte
- Too Short a Time to Fall in Love – Fred Walbask(Michael Wayne) (Last musical with Takarazuka)

==== Personal Concert ====
- Next I
- Aqua – The Blue Sky
- Across

=== Selected performances after Takarazuka ===
==== Stage ====
- Damn Yankees – Lola
- All Shook Up – Miss Sandra
- Calamity Jane – Calamity Jane
- COCO(musical) – noel
- Silk Stockings(musical) – Ninotchka
- BLUES IN THE NIGHT (musical)
- ELECTRIC CITY – Co-starring The Movement
- DANCE LEGEND vol.1 BADGIRLS meets BADBOYS – Co-starring Rasta Thomas and Bad Boys Of Dance
- DANCE LEGEND vol.2 Argentango – produced by Gustavo Zajac
- TAKARAZUKA OG version CHICAGO – Velma
