= Cultural depictions of John F. Kennedy =

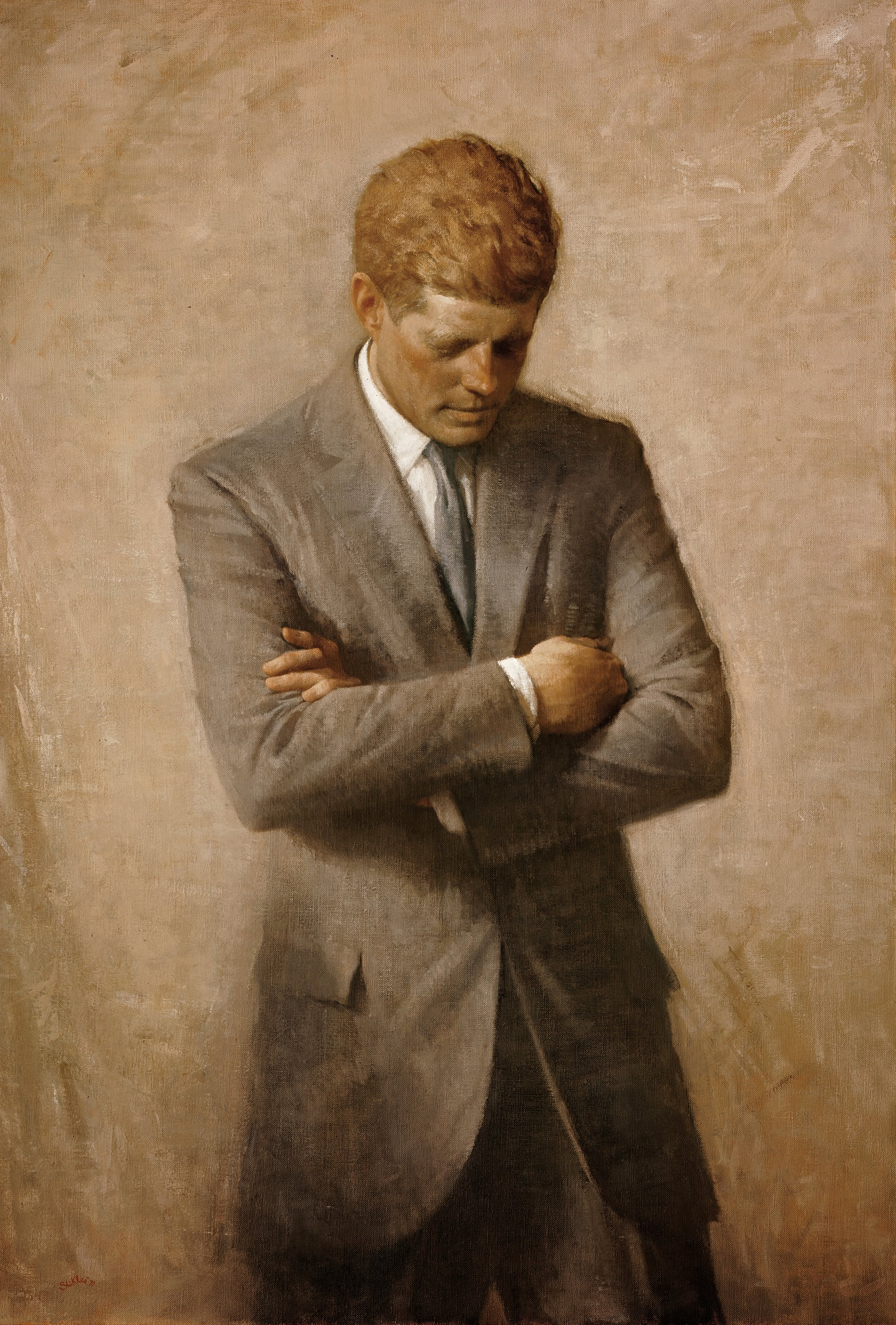
Official Presidential portrait of John F. Kennedy painted by Aaron Shikler

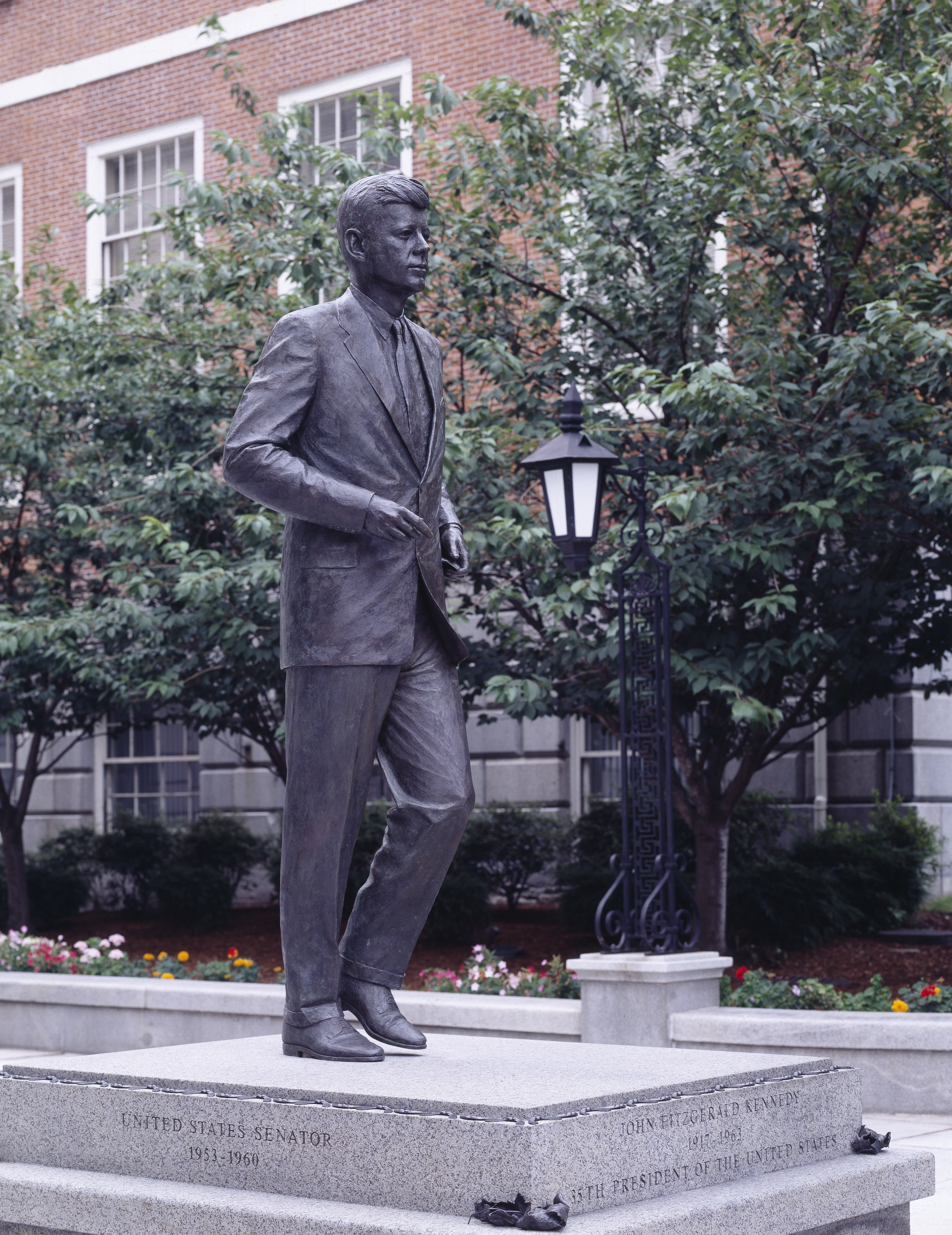
John F. Kennedy, a 1988 statue by Isabel McIlvain installed outside the Massachusetts State House in Boston

Cultural depictions of John F. Kennedy, the 35th American president, include films, songs, games, toys, stamps, coins, artwork, and other portrayals.

== Film and television ==
=== Fictionalized ===
- PT 109 (1963)
- The Missiles of October (1974; docudrama, made-for-TV play)
- Young Joe, the Forgotten Kennedy (1977)
- Kennedy (1983 miniseries)
- Robert Kennedy and His Times (1985 miniseries)
- Prince Jack (1985)
- Hoover vs. The Kennedys (1987)
- The Kennedys of Massachusetts (1990 miniseries)
- JFK (1991)
- A Woman Named Jackie (1991 miniseries)
- JFK: Reckless Youth (1993 miniseries)
- Red Dwarf (1997 series)
- The Rat Pack (1998 film)
- Thirteen Days (2000)
- Jackie Bouvier Kennedy Onassis (2000 miniseries)
- Power and Beauty (2002 television film)
- Clone High (2002–2003 animated series)
- Virtual JFK (2008 docudrama)
- The Kennedys (2011 miniseries)
- The Butler (2013)
- Killing Kennedy (2013 TV movie)
- LBJ (2016)
- 11/22/63 (2016 miniseries)
- Jackie (2016 film)
- The Crown (2017)
- Prey (2017 video game)
- "The Kennedy Curse" (2018, season 2, episode 5 of Timeless (Caspar Phillipson))
- Project Blue Book (2020 TV season)
- Blonde (2022)

=== Documentaries ===
- Primary (1960)
- Crisis: Behind a Presidential Commitment (1963)
- The Making of the President 1960 (1963; based on the book)
- John F. Kennedy: Years of Lightning, Day of Drums (1964)
- American Presidents: Life Portraits (1999 series)
- Roots of the Cuban Missile Crisis (2001)
- The Search for Kennedy's PT 109 (2002)
- Bobby Kennedy for President (2018 series)

=== Stylistic ===
- Forrest Gump (1994)
- Timequest (2002)
- Bubba Ho-Tep (2002)
- An American Affair (2008)
- X-Men: First Class (2011)

Brett Stimely

- My First Love (1988)
- Watchmen (2009)
- Transformers: Dark of the Moon (2011)
- Parkland (2013)
- The Terror of Hallow's Eve (2017)

== Stage production ==
- In 1995, Takarazuka Revues Snow troupe staged the biographical musical JFK. Written and directed by Shuichiro Koike, it starred Maki Ichiro as John F. Kennedy, Mari Hanafusa as Jackie Onassis, Yu Todoroki as Martin Luther King Jr., and Fubuki Takane as Robert Kennedy.
- JFK: A Musical Drama (1997)
- JFK (2016), a three-act opera by David T. Little with an English-language libretto by Royce Vavrek. Based on the final night of Kennedy's life at the Hotel Texas in Fort Worth.

== Music and spoken word ==
Over 200 musical works have been released about JFK, most of which were released following his assassination. Most notably "Bullet", written by Glenn Danzig, first recorded by Misfits (band) in January and February of 1978 and released as the band's second single in June of the same year. Some other various examples are:

- The First Family, a comedic impersonation album written and performed by Vaughn Meader (1962)
- "PT-109", written by Marijohn Wilkin and Fred Burch, sung by Jimmy Dean (1962)
- "In the Summer of His Years", lyrics by Herb Kretzmer and music by David Lee, first sung by Millicent Martin (1963)
- "Elegy for J.F.K." by Igor Stravinsky (1964)
- "That Was the President", written and sung by Phil Ochs (1965)
- "He Was a Friend of Mine", written by Jim McGuinn, sung by The Byrds (1965)
- The Kennedy Dream, an album by Oliver Nelson (1967)
- "Crucifixion", written and sung by Phil Ochs (1967)
- "Abraham, Martin and John", written by Dick Holler, sung by Dion (1968)
- ”Murder Most Foul”, written by Bob Dylan, alludes to the events around Kennedy’s assassination throughout the song (2020)

== Artwork ==
White House Curator William G. Allman discusses the inspiration behind Aaron Shikler's portrait of John F. Kennedy

- Presidential portrait, painted by Aaron Shikler (1970)
- John F. Kennedy Memorial, 1965, London, bust by Jacques Lipchitz
- John Fitzgerald Kennedy Memorial, 1965 bas-relief sculpture in Portland, Oregon, artist unknown
- John F. Kennedy Memorial, 1965 Brooklyn portrait bust (replacement dedicated in 2010) by Neil Estern
- J. F. Kennedy Memorial, 1968 original, 2013 recreation, mosaic by Kenneth Budd in Birmingham, England
- John F. Kennedy, 1988 Boston statue by Isabel McIlvain

== Toys and games ==
- PT-109 (model kit)
- PT-109 edition John F. Kennedy "G.I. Joe" action figure
- Battlestations: Midway, in which Kennedy appears, commanding Motor Torpedo Boat PT-109, in the single player campaign mission "Defense of the Philippines".
- Call of Duty: Black Ops, in which Kennedy appears as a non-playable character in the single player campaign mission "U.S.D.D." as well as a playable character in the "Zombies" game mode on the map "Five".
- Electoral Carnage, in which Kennedy appears as a playable character.

== Governmental images ==
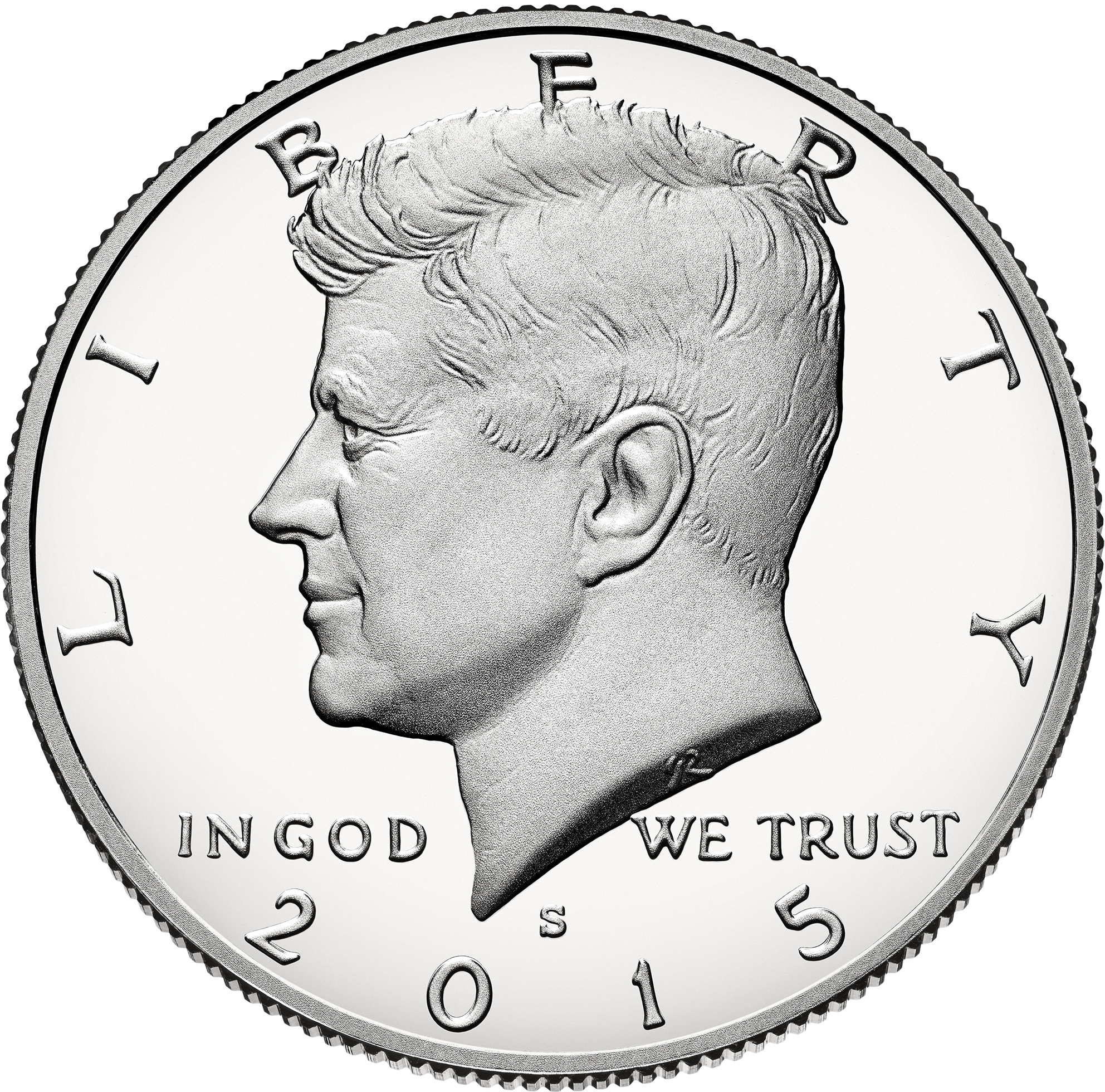
The Kennedy half dollar has been the official United States half dollar coin since 1964

- Presidents of the United States on U.S. postage stamps § John F. Kennedy
  - Five cents John Kennedy, 1964 stamp
- Kennedy half dollar, official U.S. half dollar from 1964 to the present

== See also ==
- Cultural depictions of Jacqueline Kennedy Onassis
- List of memorials to John F. Kennedy
- Robert F. Kennedy in media
