= Suzuho Makaze =

Japanese actress (born 1986)

- 真風 涼帆
- Pronunciation: まかぜ すずほ
- Born: July 18, 1986 (age 39); Kumamoto Prefecture, Kikuchi District
- Education: Takarazuka Music School
- Occupations: Actress, singer
- Years active: 2006–present
- Known for: Cosmos Troupe Top Star (2017–2023)
- Notable work: Ocean's 11, Flying Sapa, Never Say Goodbye, High&Low
- Height: 175 cm (5 ft 9 in)
- Spouse: Katsuya (m. 2024)
- Website: https://suzuho-makaze.com/

Suzuho Makaze (真風 涼帆, Makaze Suzuho, born July 18, 1986) is a Japanese actress and a former Takarazuka Revue otokoyaku (男役, "male role"), born in Kumamoto Prefecture, Kikuchi District. She was a leading actress of the Cosmos Troupe (Top Star).

== Career ==
In 2004, she entered the Takarazuka Music School and graduated in 2006 as part of the 92 class, ranked 15th. Her debut was with the Cosmos Troupe production of the musical "Never Say Goodbye", after which was officially assigned to the Star Troupe.

In 2009, in the "My dear New Orleans", final performance for leading actresses (top combi) Kei Aran and Asuka Tono, she played her first leading role in the newcomer performance (新人公演). After that, played lead role in newcomer performance again 4 times. In 2011, had the first main stage Bow Hall leading role for the musical Lancelot. At the Nippon Seinenkan in 2013, in the "Where the Sun Shines" musical, she plays the leading role in Tokyo for the first time.

In 2015, she was transferred to the Cosmos Troupe. Same year, when Manato Asaka and Rion Misaki debuted as the Cosmos Troupe top combi with "A Song for Kingdoms", Suzuho Makaze simultaneously became the second-ranking otokoyaku (二番手, nibante) of the troupe.

In 2017, she became the 8th top star of the Cosmos Troupe as Manato Asaka's successor. Her musumeyaku (娘役, "young female role") partner becomes Madoka Hoshikaze and they debuted the following year at the Tokyo International Forum, with the musical "West Side Story". In 2021, due to Madoka Hoshikaze's transfer to the Superior Members (Senka), Hana Jun became Makaze's new partner. The new top combi debuted at the Takarazuka Grand Theater, with the performance "Sherlock Holmes / Délicieux!".

Makaze graduated on June 11th 2023, with "Casino Royale" musical at the Takarazuka Grand Theater, along with her partner Hana Jun. She was a Top star for 5 years and 7 months in total, same as Rio Asumi, which is 3rd longest run after Yōka Wao and Reon Yuzuki.

After Takarazuka she expanded her activities to theatre and concert.

== Biography ==
Makaze was born in 1986 in the Kumamoto Prefecture, Kikuchi District. She has a younger brother. She showed interest in dancing from a young age due to her mother running dance classes. In primary school she learned piano, penmanship and abacus (practiced primarily by children in Japan and China). In middle school, being invited by a close friend, she joins the table tennis club.

In her third year of middle school, she attended a Takarazuka Moon Troupe's performance. In the theater, she found an application form for the Takarazuka Music School, and with the support of her mother she decides to take the entrance exam right after graduating middle school. Due to no prior preparation, she fails at the second stage of the entrance exam. She attends another show, this time from the Flower Troupe and is once more reminded of her desire to enter, saying to herself "I really do want to enter here after all". She learns ballet and vocals during her high school period. In her second year, she produced an original dance for Sports Day and was selected as the school's representative for the Kumamoto Prefecture Recital where she won first place for her performance. On her third try at the Takarazuka Music School exam, she passes.

In September 2024, she married with actor Katsuya.

== Notable Takarazuka works ==
First Stage

- 2006, "Never Say Goodbye"

Star Troupe performance

- 2008, "El Halcón" Rose
- 2008, "Anna Karenina" Serpukhovsky
- 2010, "Romeo and Juliet" Death
- 2011, "Lancelot" Lancelot
- 2011-2012, "Ocean's 11" Linus Caldwell
- 2013, "Romeo and Juliet" Death / Tybalt
- 2014, "Le Roi Soleil" François de Beaufort
- 2015, "Like a Black Panther" Rafael de Vistachio

Cosmos Troupe performance

- 2015, "A Song for Kingdoms" Ubaldo
- 2016, "Vampire Succession" Sidney Alucard
- 2016, "Elisabeth" Franz Joseph

As a Top star

- 2018, "West Side Story" Tony
- 2019, "Ocean's 11" Danny Ocean
- 2020, "Flying Sapa" Obak
- 2020-21, "Anastasia" Dmitry
- 2021, "Sherlock Holmes- The Game's Afoot!" Sherlock Holmes
- 2022, "Never Say Goodbye" Georges Malraux
- 2023, "High&Low THE PREQUEL" Cobra
- 2023, "Casino Royale" James Bond

Events

- 2012, "Reon!!" (Reon Yuzuki Concert)
- 2015, "The Reon!!" (Reon Yuzuki Dinner Show)
- 2017, "Paris Festival"
- 2022, "Fly with Me"
- 2023, "Makaze Izm"

== Commercials ==
- "BC Walker" for Asics (2011)
- "Iwatani Corporation" (2019–2023)

== Awards ==
- Takarazuka Revue "Rookie of The Year Award" (2010)
- Hankyu Sumire Society Pansy Award- "Rookie of the Year Award" (2011)
- Takarazuka Revue "Effort of The Year Award" (2013)
- Takarazuka Revue "Effort of The Year Award" (2015)
- Hankyu Sumire Society Pansy Award- "Otokoyaku Award" (2019)
- Takarazuka Revue "Outstanding Performance Award" (2020)

== Main Post-Takarazuka Activities ==
Stage

- 2023, REON MUST GO ON! (Reon Yuzuki OG Dinner Show)
- 2023-2023, "Lupin - Countess Cagliostro's Secret", Countess Cagliostro
- 2024, Concert "Unknown"
