= Yōka Wao =

Japanese performing artist (born 1968)

- Born: Takako Ōkawa; 15 February 1968 (age 58); Osaka, Japan
- Occupations: Actress, singer-songwriter
- Years active: 1988–present
- Height: 1.74 m (5 ft 8 1/2 in)
- Spouse: Frank Wildhorn (m. 2015)
- Website: yokawao.com

Yōka Wao (和央 ようか, Wao Yōka; born 15 February 1968) is a Japanese performing artist and a former member of the Takarazuka Revue, where she specialized in playing male characters (Otokoyaku). She joined the revue in 1988 and resigned in 2006.

Her nicknames are Takako (from her real name: Takako Ōkawa (大川 貴子 Ōkawa Takako) and Wao.

She is the only Otokoyaku to be top in her class as well as the last otokoyaku top star to have joined the company during the Shōwa era.

She was born and raised in Osaka (according to Takarazuka Graph 2003 April issue).

== Troupe history ==
- Snow Troupe: 1988–1997
- Cosmos Troupe: 1998–2006

== General information ==
Wao first attracted attention when she played the role of Oscar in the New Actor Show of 1989 Snow Production Rose of Versailles. Later on, she took the leading role in the New Actor Show of High and Low. After graduating from the New Actor Show cast, she progressed to playing solid supporting roles in the main troupe productions. One of her notable roles during the Maki Ichiro era is Elmer in the 1997 production of Elisabeth. When Kouju Tatsuki, who played Rudolf in the Grand Theater, changed troupes, Wao took the role for the Tokyo performance.

She got her first Takarazuka Bow Hall show (Grand Shanghai) in 1995 and the second one (Wuthering Heights) in 1997.

With the retirement of Maki Ichiro and her successor Fubuki Takane, Wao became the firm second man for Yū Todoroki in Snow Troupe before she was selected for the new Cosmos Troupe in 1998. She continued to be the second man in Cosmos Troupe until the resignation of Asato Shizuki. She became the top star of Cosmos Troupe in 2000 and when she retired in 2006, she had had the longest run ever as male-role top star of all time.

With a height of 174 cm, she was the tallest star among her peer top stars such as Mire Aika (Flower), Hibiki Takumi (Flower), Tsubasa Makoto (Moon), Jun Shibuki (Moon), Yū Todoroki (Snow), Yū Emao (Snow), Kō Minoru (Star) and Tatsuki Kōju (Star).

She is one of the three actresses to portray both Emperor Franz Joseph and Prince Rudolph in Elisabeth (the other are Sakiho Juri and Mao Ayabuki) and is one of two actresses to portray Rudolf in two different musicals (Elisabeth and Mayerling), the other being Ouki Kaname, the current top star of the Cosmos troupe.

In December 2005, she injured herself during the performance of W-Wing (her personal concert) but was able to come back for Never Say Goodbye, her last musical with Takarazuka.

In January 2007, she had her first personal concert since she left the company.

Right now, Wao is an independent artist with her and her top star partner Mari Hanafusa having founded their own private office Wao Enterprise with Hanafusa as her manager. This is notable due to it being uncommon that top star partners who have left the company would continue to work together in such close relationship.

While having her second concert (New Yoka ～Rockin' Broadway～) at Tokyo in August 2007, she was the guest star for Russell Watson's concert at Tokyo later on. She and Watson performed at Rokuonji Temple.

Her first movie was Chacha: Tengai no Onna, which she plays as the leading actress in the role of Lady Chacha. The movie premiered in Japan on 22 December 2007. She later received the award of Best Actress at the Osaka Cinema Festival for this role.

In 2008, it was announced that she will be Velma Kelly for the Japanese version of Chicago with Ryoko Yonekura as Roxie and Ryuichi Kawamura as Billy in October and November. This was marked as her first musical drama outside Takarazuka.

Wao is currently set to star in Dracula, the Musical, another Frank Wildhorn production, in August 2011. This is her first otokoyaku role outside of Takarazuka, and she is the first female to play the role. In April 2015 she married Frank Wildhorn in Maui, Hawaii.

== Notable performances and roles ==
=== Takarazuka Era ===
==== Snow New Actor Show Era ====
- Rose of Versailles – Oscar
- High and Low

==== Snow Era ====
- Elisabeth – Elmer/Rudolf (Replacing Tatsuji Kouju for Tokyo performance)
- Grand Shanghai – Chan (First leading performance at Takarazuka Bow Hall)
- An Invitation from Alice – Michael (Bow Hall Performance, starring Fubuki Takane)
- On a Clear Day You Can See Forever – Melinda's lover
- Wuthering Heights – Heathcliff (Leading performance at Takarazuka Bow Hall)

==== Cosmos Era ====
- Excalibur – Christopher (First show for Cosmos Troupe)
- Elisabeth – Franz-Joseph
- Crossroad – Alphonso (Last leading performance before being top star)
- Black Rose of the Desert – Yawan

==== Cosmos Top Star Era ====
- Mayerling (Top Star Debut) – Rudolph
- Nostalgia Across the Sea (Top Star Debut at Grand Theater)
- Rose of Versailles: Fersen and Marie Antoinette – Hans Axel Von Fersen
- Castel Mirage – Leonardo
- Calaf & Turandot – Calaf
- Pierre the Mercenary – Pierre
- Lightning in the Daytime – Albert de Clair
- Boxman – Kevin Randall
- Phantom – Phantom/Erik
- Gone with the Wind – Rhett Butler
- A Kiss to the Flames – Manrico
- Hotel Stella Maris – William Odenell
- Never Say Goodbye – Georges Malraux (Last musical with Takarazuka)

==== Personal Concert ====
- So in Love
- W-ing

=== Performance after Takarazuka ===
==== Concert ====
- Wao Yoka Concert
- New Yoka ~Rockin' Broadway~ (Also credited as the creator)
- JAL Kinkakuji Otobutai

==== Film ====
- Chacha: Tengai no Onna – Chacha

==== Stage ====
- Chicago (Japanese version) – Velma Kelly

== Awards ==
| Year | Award | Work | Note |
| 2007 | Best Actress – Osaka Cinema Festival | Chacha: Tengai no Onna |
| 2004 | Kazuo Kikuta Drama Award | Boxman | shared with Mari Hanafusa |

== Wao, Kozuki and Elisabeth ==
Wataru Kozuki, who is a year junior than Wao, shares some similarities of their career related to Elisabeth:

- Both are the veterans from the production of 1997 Snow and Star when they participated the Cosmos production.
- Wao portrayed Elmer in the Takarazuka run in the 1997 Snow production and Kozuki portrayed the same role in both locations.
- They became the top stars of the company later on (Cosmos and Star)
- During their junior years and before the founding of Cosmos Troupe, they had been in the same troupes with legend Mari Hanafusa, who is the only star that portrayed Elisabeth in both Snow and Cosmos Production.

| Preceded by Asato Shizuki | Top Star (Otokoyaku) for Cosmos Troupe; 2000–2006 | Succeeded by Kei Takashiro |
