= Asuka Tono =

Japanese actress (born 1978)

Asuka Tono is an actress who was a top star (musumyaku) for Star Troupe of Takarazuka Revue. She joined the revue company in 1998 and became the top star along with Kei Aran. She is from Chiba Prefecture, her birthday is November 28, 1978 and her nicknames are Asuka and Fukui.

She was the second pupil of her class to reach top star status, also the first musumeyaku (Takarazuka actresses who play female roles) from Cosmos Troup to reach top status.

== Troupe history ==
- Cosmo Troupe: 1997–2001
- Flower Troupe: 2001–2006
- Supreme Member: 2006
- Star Troupe: 2006–present

== General information ==
As one of the second group of new members (the class of 1997 is the first group) to be assigned to the newly found Cosmo Troupe, she has a quick start of her Takarazuka career: she starred with Yōka Wao and Sakiho Juri in Crossroad in her third year, and she partnered up with Juri in the latter's first Bow Hall starring, Freedom: Mr. Carmen as Josie, which both Juri and she received great applause.

However, her main development is when she was in Flower Troupe, where she participated a couple New Actor shows: Elisabeth are among those. Like Kanami Ayano, she steadily became the second tier musumyaku and join Mao Ayabuki in her first Bow Hall starring, Naked City. She got her applause portraying as Yvette d'Amboise in Marrakech: A Crimson Tombstone and later on, she rejoined with Juri in the latter's final Takarazuka performance, Ernest in Love as Gwendolen Fairfax.

When Miyo Fuzuki, the musumeyaku top star of Flower Troupe from 2003 to 2006, announced her resignation, the public expected that she would be the next top star. However, she was transferred to Senka and a more younger star, Ayane Sakurano was being promoted.

She just spent less than a year in Senka. During this period of time, she participated both Star's and Cosmo's production Copacabana as Conchita Alvares, another highlight of her career.

Following the resignation of Wataru Kozuki and the transfer of her then partner Yuri Shirahane (also the classmate of Tono) back to Snow Troupe to be paired up with Natsuki Mizu, she finally became the top musumeyaku top star of Star Troupe with Kei Aran.

== Notable Performance and Roles ==
=== Cosmo New Actor era ===
- Passion: Jose and Carmen - Micaela (her role in regular performance is Conchita)
- Crossroad - Helen (Starring Yōka Wao)
- Freedom: Mr. Carmen - Josie (Bow Hall performance, starring Sakiho Juri)
- Black Rose of the Desert - Marianna (first leading musumeyaku role)

=== Flower New Actor era ===
- In the Amber-Hued Rain - Sharon (her role in the regular performance is Francoise de Plaire)
- Elisabeth - Elisabeth ^{1}
- A Flute Named Wind - Princess Iroha (her role in the regular performance is Rindo)
- La Esperanza - Mirva (her role in the regular performance is Frasquita)

=== Flower era ===
- Naked City - Daisy (Bow Hall performance, starring Mao Ayabuki)
- Hand Drum of Heaven - Izu Ibuki
- Marrakech: A Crimson Tombstone - Yvette d'Amboise
- Ernest in Love - Gwendolen Fairfax
- Palermo Shines in the Setting Sun - Giuditta Ferri

=== Supreme Member era ===
==== With Star Troupe ====
- Copacabana - Conchita Alvares

==== With Cosmo Troupe ====
- Copacabana - Conchita Alvares (The top star debut of Kei Takashiro and Rui Shijō)

=== Star Top Star era ===
- Hays Code - Livy Fontaine (Top Star Debut)
- Secret Hunter - Jennifer (Top Star Debut at Grand Theater)
- El Halcon - Gilda

=== Performance outside Takarazuka ===
- Cinderella, Cinderella (with Sakiho Juri/Sei Matobu and former members of TCA)
- ^1 : During the regular performance, she also substituted for Rei Ootori when she was not available.

Preceded by Yuri Shirahane	Top Star (Musumeyaku) for Star Troupe; 2005-2009	Succeeded by Nene Yumesaki
