= Takeshis' =

2005 Japanese film by Takeshi Kitano

- Directed by: Takeshi Kitano
- Written by: Takeshi Kitano
- Produced by: Masayuki Mori
- Starring: Beat Takeshi; Susumu Terajima; Kotomi Kyono
- Cinematography: Katsumi Yanagishima
- Edited by: Takeshi Kitano; Yoshinori Ota
- Music by: NAGI. Yosuke Kakegawa; Shoko Fujikawa
- Production companies: Bandai Visual; Tokyo FM; Dentsu; TV Asahi
- Distributed by: Shochiku; Office Kitano
- Release date: 2005
- Running time: Japan
- Language: Japanese

Takeshis' is a 2005 Japanese film directed, written, edited by, and starring Takeshi Kitano. It is the first film in Kitano's surrealist autobiographical trilogy, being followed by Glory to the Filmmaker!, and Achilles and the Tortoise.

== Film structure ==
The original working title of Takeshis' was Fractal, suggesting the film's structure. The film has nested story-lines and depicts an 8½-like identity crisis theme in autobiographical style. It is also strongly characterised by a series of surrealistic motifs linked by chance encounters.

A prominent theme of the film is duality, as almost all the main characters appear in two forms or roles. Although it is hard to lay one's finger on the interpretation of this film, it can be said that self-actualization is at least a major underlying theme.

== Plot ==
Takeshis' progresses through the nested storyline of the dual protagonists, Beat Takeshi and Mr. Kitano (both played by Kitano himself). Beat Takeshi, a prominent actor, meets a look-alike named Mr. Kitano, who is a struggling actor. After the meeting, Mr. Kitano's dreams take a violent, surreal turn.

The film opens with a nightmare vision. American soldiers with carbines move down the fallen base filled up with bodies of Japanese combatants. One of dying combatants appears to be (Beat or Kitano) Takeshi. This opening scene is followed by the gun battle of a yakuza film where one of the protagonists, 'Beat' Takeshi, plays the principal role. Flashbacks of this gun battle are frequently used throughout the film.

'Beat' Takeshi is a showbiz star. He lives through business in film studio and TV stations where main casts appear in one of their dual roles (Takeshi's Girlfriend (Kotomi Kyono), Takeshi's Manager (Ren Osugi), and Takeshi's former partner of stand-up comedy (Susumu Terajima)).

The first appearance sequence of 'Beat' Takeshi also introduces some repetitive motives of Takeshis'. (The caterpillar in a bouquet, a female impersonator of taishū engeki (Taichi Saotome), tap dancers in a rehearsal set, Akihiro Miwa (a transvestite chanson singer), a pair of fat twins, and dialogs at a ramen restaurant repeated later in varied situations.)

Mr. Kitano, the other protagonist, appears in a clown costume among the guys in a wardrobe of TV station. Mr. Kitano is an everyman, obsessed with his appearance identical to 'Beat' Takeshi. When two Takeshis encounter for the first time, Mr. Kitano seeks his heartthrob charisma's autograph. 'Beat' Takeshi gives the autograph to him.

Kitano, earning a living as a convenience store clerk, never gets ahead as an actor. He begins to fantasize himself as 'Beat' Takeshi in daydreams. Fragments of surreal dream crosses over into his life. We see bizarre things accompanied by dead bodies on the road while he is moonlighting as a taxi driver.

Kitano then happens to pick up a gun at a yakuza quarrel. He shoots first his yakuza neighbor (Susumu Terajima), and begins to kill people around his world. The film implies it is some kind of a dream, showing deceased guys appear again in blood and yell alive normally. Kitano takes out his female neighbor (Kotomi Kyono) and commits a bank robbery. Accomplishing his fantasies of acting like a movie star 'Beat' Takeshi, Kitano takes a journey into the absolutely bizarre, surreal world (an underground nightclub, night gun battles, and the catastrophe at a Boiling Point-, or Sonatine-like tropical island).

Cut suddenly back to Kitano's real life where he is still confused himself and 'Beat' Takeshi. He finds the movie star's autograph greeting, "Hello Mr. Clown!". It triggers 'Beat' Takeshi's assassination by Mr. Kitano. Cut suddenly again back to a close-up of 'Beat' Takeshi, which implies all of the film might be a dream of 'Beat' Takeshi. The film ends with flashback images of an American Soldier and the gun battle of a yakuza film at the beginning.

== Cast ==
- Beat Takeshi as Beat Takeshi/Mr. Kitano
- Kotomi Kyono as Takeshi's Girlfriend/Kitano's female neighbor
- Kayoko Kishimoto as Mahjong parlor woman/audition producer/customer
- Ren Osugi as Takeshi's Manager/Taxi driver
- Susumu Terajima as Takeshi's friend/Kitano's yakuza neighbor
- Tetsu Watanabe as TV wardrobe master/noodle cook/audition actor
- Taichi Saotome as himself
- Akihiro Miwa as himself

== Reception ==
Takeshis' has an approval rating of 40% on review aggregator website Rotten Tomatoes, based on 5 reviews, and an average rating of 4.9/10. The plot's vague, often detached narrative is a considerable source of humour within the film. It has been lauded as both an achievement of surreal comedy and a work of considerable editorial complexity.

== Reviews ==
"Kitano's trilogy of parts aside, there's a bevy of other doppelgangers, mirror images and dead-ringers rife throughout this movie," reported the Daily Yomiuri in its review in 2005. "Kotomi Kyono, while a tad dull as the movie star Takeshi's girlfriend, bears more than just costume jewellery sparkle in her ulterior role as a glitzy, ditsy yakuza girlfriend who happens to be the deadbeat Takeshi's tormenting neighbor."
