= Mari Hanafusa =

Japanese actress (born 1973)

Hanafusa Mari 花總 まり
- Also known as: Hana, Fusa, Dai-chan
- Born: Daigo Mariko (醍醐まり子); February 28, 1973 (age 53)
- Origin: Tokyo, Japan
- Genres: Musical theatre
- Occupations: Singer; Actress
- Instruments: Violin; Piano
- Years active: 1991–present
- Website: www.blooming-net.com/blooming-agency/hanafusa-mari/

Mari Hanafusa (花總 まり, Hanafusa Mari) (born February 28, 1973) is a Japanese actress and former member of the Takarazuka Revue. She held the position of Top Musumeyaku (lead female-role) in both the Snow and Cosmos troupes, holding the longest tenure in Takarazuka history at 12 years and 3 months. She’s best known for playing Empress Elisabeth of Austria in the Japan premiere of the musical Elisabeth and is currently active under Blooming Agency.

== Troupe membership history ==
- Star Troupe: 1991–1993
- Snow Troupe: 1993–1998
- Cosmos Troupe: 1998–2006

== Personal information ==
Mari Hanafusa quickly gained audience attention during her early years with the Star Troupe. Only three years after her debut in 1991, she was appointed as the Top Musumeyaku (lead female-role) star of the Snow Troupe in 1994. During her career, Hanafusa partnered with five different Top Otokoyaku stars—Maki Ichiro, Fubuki Takane, Yū Todoroki, Asato Shizuki, and notably, Yōka Wao, her longest-running partner. Her tenure remains the longest in Takarazuka history for a musumeyaku, with 12-year and 3-month.

In 1994, she became the first musumeyaku ever to achieve Top billing during a newcomer performance as Scarlett O'Hara in Gone with the Wind. Traditionally, such billing had exclusively belonged to male-role actors (otokoyaku), marking her performance as a notable exception.

Hanafusa’s portrayal of Elisabeth in the Japanese premiere of the musical Elisabeth in 1996 became one of her signature performances. She subsequently continued to take on numerous significant roles, such as Carmen in Passion: José and Carmen, Marie Antoinette in The Rose of Versailles, and Christine in the Japanese premiere of Phantom.

In 1998, she transferred to the newly established Cosmos Troupe, becoming one of the few musumeyaku—alongside Hitomi Tsukikage (Star and Snow troupes), Rei Dan (Moon and Star troupes), Yuri Shirahane (Star and Snow troupes) and Madoka Hoshikaze (Cosmos and Flower troupes) — to serve as top star in two different troupes.

Hanafusa retired from Takarazuka in 2006 alongside Yōka Wao after the production Never Say Goodbye. She returned shortly afterward, co-founding Wao Enterprise with Wao in February 2007, serving as Wao's representative and frequent co-star until 2011.

After leaving Wao Enterprise, Hanafusa resumed her stage career with From First Production in 2012, later joining Blooming Agency. She continues performing in musicals, with notable main roles in The Count of Monte Cristo, Lady Bess (in its world premiere, she became the cover feature of a German magazine), Mozart!, Elisabeth, 1789: Les Amants de la Bastille, Romale, Marie Antoinette, The Odd Couple, Galaxy Express 999, Sunny, and Beethoven. In addition to her stage career, she has appeared in television dramas such as NHK's historical drama (Taiga) Onna Joshu Naotora, Berabou, and Moribito: Guardian of the Spirit.

Her distinguished career has earned numerous awards, including the Yomiuri Theater Award (2015), the Kazuo Kikuta Theater Award Grand Prize (2016), an Austrian national honor (2019), and the Matsuo Entertainment Theater Excellence Award (2021).

== Performances and roles ==
=== Takarazuka era ===
==== Debut ====
Year	Performance	Troupe	Theater	Role	Note
1991	Rose of Versailles ~Oscar~	Moon	Grand Theater		

==== Troupe rotation ====
Year	Performance	Troupe	Theater	Role	Note
1991	The Great Gatsby / Lovers' Concerto	Snow	Grand Theater		
1991	The Emblem of Venezia / Junction 24	Flower	Tokyo Theater		

==== Star Troupe era ====
Year	Performance	Theater	Role	New Actor Show Role	Note
1992	Sunset of the Forbidden City	Tokyo Theater			
1992	Legend of the Midnight Sun / One Night Mirage	Grand Theater	Mimir		
1992	Hello, George!	Bow Hall	Elizabeth		
1993	Houjushou / Parfum de Paris	Grand Theater		Dancing Lady S / Lover / Parisienne (HY: Shiraki Ayaka)	
1993	Hello, George!	Nippon Seinenkan	Elizabeth		
1993	Mayerling / Paparagi	Grand Theater	Millie Stübel	Marie Vetsera (HY: Shiraki Ayaka)	First New Actor Show Heroine

==== Snow Troupe era ====
Year	Performance	Theater	Role	New Actor Show Role	Note
1993–94	Seal of the Bourbons / La Cote d'Azur	Grand Theater	Mariel		
1994	A Battlefield for the Two of Us	Bow Hall / Nippon Seinenkan	Lyla		First Small Theater Heroine
1994	Gone with the Wind	Grand Theater	Carreen O'Hara	Scarlett O'Hara (HY: Ichiro Maki)	First New Actor Show Leading Role

==== Snow Troupe Top Musumeyaku era ====
Year	Performance	Theater	Role	Note
1994	A Battlefield for the Two of Us	Aichi Annuity Hall	Lyla	Pre-Top Musumeyaku Debut
1994–95	An Actor's Revenge / Sagittarius	Grand Theater	Namiji	Top Musumeyaku Debut
1995	JFK / 1001 Baroque Nights	Grand Theater	Jacqueline Kennedy	
1995	Aria Dream Song	Drama City	Mary	
1995	Love Blooms Out on the Murasakino / Ma Belle Etoile	Grand Theater	Nukata no Ookimi	
1996	Elisabeth	Grand Theater	Elisabeth	
1996	Love Blooms Out on the Murasakino / Ma Belle Etoile	National Tour	Nukata no Ookimi	
1996	Natasha of the Rainbow / La Jeunesse!	Grand Theater	Natasha	
1996	On a Clear Day You Can See Forever	Bow Hall	Daisy Gamble	
1997	Romanesque Mask / Golden Days!	Grand Theater	Marquise de Merteuil	
1997	On a Clear Day You Can See Forever	Nippon Seinenkan / Aichi	Daisy Gamble	
1997	Ghost at Midnight / Les Cherubim	Grand Theater	Marie	Final Performance as Snow Troupe Top Musumeyaku

==== Cosmos Troupe era ====
Year	Performance	Theater	Role	Note
1998	Mugen Houjushou / This is TAKARAZUKA!	Hong Kong Tour		Cosmos Troupe Pre-Top Musumeyaku Debut
1998	Excalibur / Citrus Breeze	Grand Theater	Rosaline	Cosmos Troupe Top Musumeyaku Debut
1998	Bow Voyage!	Bow Hall		
1998–99	Elisabeth	Grand Theater	Elisabeth	
1999	Excalibur / Citrus Breeze	National Tour	Rosaline	
1999	Passion: Jose and Carmen / The Revue '99	Grand Theater	Carmen	
2000	Black Rose of the Desert / Glorious	Grand Theater	Marianna	
2000	Mayerling / Glorious	National Tour	Marie Vetsera	
2000	Nostalgia Across the Sea / Millennium Challenger!	Grand Theater	Princess Yu, Catherine the Great	
2001	Nostalgia Across the Sea / Millennium Challenger!	National Tour	Princess Yu, Catherine the Great	
2001	Rose of Versailles: Fersen and Marie Antoinette	Grand Theater	Marie Antoinette	
2001–02	Castel Mirage / Dancing Spirit!	Grand Theater	Eva-Marie	
2002	Castel Mirage / Dancing Spirit!	National Tour	Eva-Marie	
2002	Legend of the Phoenix -Calaf & Turandot- / The Showstopper	Grand Theater	Turandot	
2002–03	Miracle of the Holy Star	Drama City / Akasaka ACT	Lydia	
2003	Pierre the Mercenary / The Star Dust Party	Grand Theater	Joan of Arc	
2003	Legend of the Phoenix -Calaf & Turandot- / The Showstopper	Drama City / Akasaka ACT	Turandot	
2003–04	Lightning in the Daytime / Temptation!	Grand Theater	Vivianne de Pauvert	
2004	BOXMAN	Nippon Seinenkan / Drama City	Dolly Page	
2004	Phantom	Grand Theater	Christine Daaé	
2004	Gone with the Wind	National Tour	Scarlett O'Hara	
2005	Hotel Stella Maris / The Legend of the Revue	Grand Theater	Stacy Lancaster	
2005	Hotel Stella Maris / The Legend of the Revue	National Tour	Stacy Lancaster	
2005	A Kiss to the Flames / Neo Voyage	Grand Theater	Leonora	
2005	W-WING-	Drama City		
2006	Never Say Goodbye	Grand Theater	Katherine McGregor / Peggy McGregor	Last Musical with Takarazuka

=== Performance after Takarazuka ===
- 2010: Dietrich – Edith Piaf
- 2011: Dracula, the Musical – Mina Murray – Heroine
- 2011: LOVE LETTERS 2011 21st Anniversary – Melissa
- 2011: MODEA Winter Live 2011 – Guest vocals
- 2012: Elisabeth Special Gala Concert
- 2013: No Words, No Time
- 2013: Eien Monogatari – Yoshioka Yoshiko – Heroine
- 2013: Broadway Musical Live
- 2013: The Count of Monte Cristo – Mercédès – Heroine
- 2014, 2017: Lady Bess – Elizabeth I – Lead role
- 2014: Mozart! – Nannerl
- 2015, 2016, 2019, 2023: Elisabeth – Elisabeth – Lead role
- 2016: 1789 – Marie Antoinette
- 2018: Romale – Carmen – Lead role
- 2018: The Secret Garden – Lily Craven – Heroine
- 2018, 2021: Marie Antoinette – Marie Antoinette – Lead role
- 2020, 2023: The Odd Couple – Florence Unger – Double Lead with Daichi Mao
- 2021: Closed today – Teruko – Lead role
- 2022: The Little Prince – The Rose
- 2022: Galaxy Express 999 THE MUSICAL – Maetel – Heroine
- 2023: SUNNY – Nami – Lead role (based on Korean movie SUNNY)
- 2023: Beethoven Secret – Antonie "Toni" Brentano – Heroine
- 2024: The Tiny Wife – Stacey – Lead role
- 2024: Ōten no Mon – Shouki – Special appearance
- 2025: Bagdad Cafe the Musical – Jasmine – Lead role (Based on movie Bagdad Cafe)
- 2026: Musical Pagwa – Chogak – Lead role (based on Korean novel The Old Woman with the Knife)
- 2026: Musical AGATHA – Agatha Christie – Lead role

==== Concert ====
- 2012, 1016: Elisabeth Special Gala Concert
- 2016: 25th Anniversary Hanafusa Mari First Concert ~ Especially For You ~
- 2020: Premium Symphonic Concert ~ Hanafusa Mari: Stories of the Queens
- 2020: Premium Symphonic Concert ~ Hanafusa Mari: Stories of the Queens ~ Xmas version
- 2022: Premium Symphonic Concert ~ Mari Hanafusa: Stories of the Queens Vol.2
- 2025: Imperial Theatre Concert - THE BEST New HISTORY COMING

==== Television drama ====
- 2017: Naotora: The Lady Warlord – Sana
- 2017: Moribito: Guardian of the Spirit – Yuuka
- 2021: Meiji Kaika: Shinjuro Tanteicho – Kanou Atsuko – Episode 1 (guest)
- 2024: Black Forceps Season 2 – Toshima Kazuko – Episode 4, 5 (guest)
- 2025: Unbound – Hōren-in
- 2025: News Anchor - Odonera Motoko

== Elisabeth trivia ==
Hanafusa was the first star to perform as Elisabeth of Bavaria in the musical Elisabeth and the only one to do so twice: first in a 1996 Snow production and then in a 1998 Cosmos production. Thus she was an Elisabeth who was haunted by two deaths (Maki Ichiro and Asato Shizuki), married to two Franz Josephs (Fubuki Takane and Yōka Wao), assassinated by two Luigi Luchenis (Yū Todoroki and Wataru Kozuki). She crowned four Prince Rudolfs (Tatsuki Kōju, Yōka Wao, Hikaru Asami and Sakiho Juri) because Kōju and Asami changed troupes before the Tokyo performance and were substituted by Wao and Juri.

Most of the actresses playing Franz Josephs, Rudolfs and Luigis became stars later on, except Juri, who was moved to Senka.

- Fubuki Takane (Franz Joseph [Snow])--> Snow Troupe
- Yū Todoroki (Luigi Lucheni [Snow])--> Snow Troupe
- Tatsuki Kōju (Rudolf [Snow])--> Star Troupe
- Yōka Wao (Rudolf [Snow] and Franz Joseph [Cosmos])--> Cosmos Troupe
- Wataru Kozuki (Luigi Lucheni [Cosmos])--> Star Troupe
- Hikaru Asami (Rudolf [Cosmos])--> Snow Troupe

Preceded by Tomo Murasaki	Top Star (Musumeyaku) for Snow Troupe; 1994-1998	Succeeded by Hitomi Tsukikage
Preceded by None (Troupe newly established)	Top Star (Musumeyaku) for Cosmos Troupe; 1998-2006	Succeeded by Rui Shijō
