= Daigoro Tachibana =

Japanese actor

Daigoro Tachibana 橘 大五郎
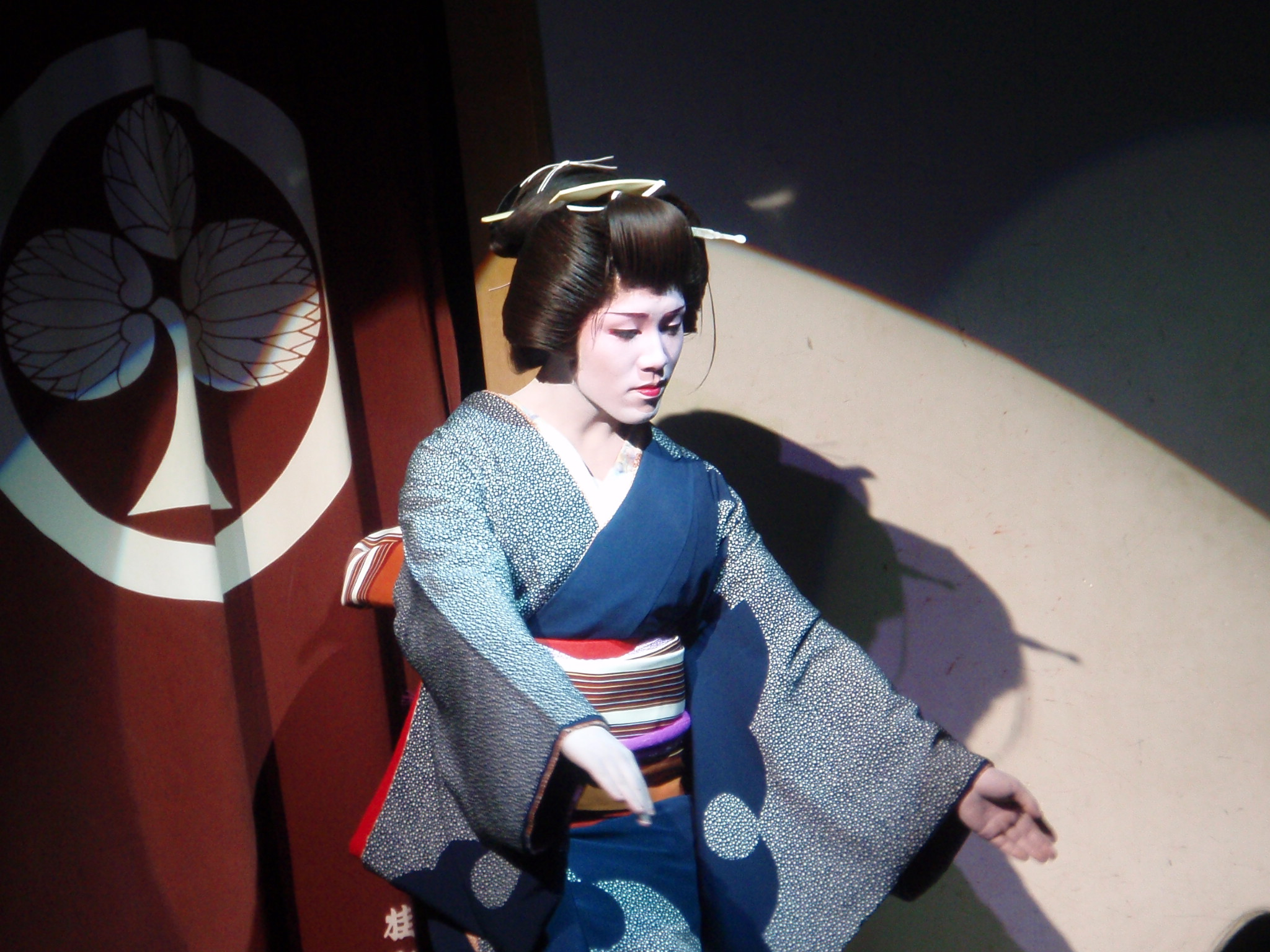
- Performing at Miyoshi-bashi Theatre, Yokohama
- Born: Daisuke Isayama; 27 January 1987 (age 39); Oita Prefecture, Japan
- Occupation: Taishū engeki actor
- Website: www.mandb.co.jp/...

Daigoro Tachibana (橘 大五郎 Tachibana Daigorō), birth name Daisuke Isayama (諌山 大輔 Isayama Daisuke, born 27 January 1987) is one of the Heisei era's celebrated onnagata and taishū engeki actor. He is branded as the Taishu Engeki-kai Purinsu (大衆演劇界プリンス, Taishu Engeki's Prince) with the alias "Taishū engeki-kai no Nyūhīrō Tensai Onnagata" (大衆演劇界のニューヒーロー 天才女形, Taishū engeki's New Hero Genius Onnagata) and best remembered as Osei in Takeshi Kitano’s Zatoichi: The Blind Swordsman (2003). He is one of the taishū engeki stars to have become a professional enka recording artist.

== Early life ==
Tachibana was born into a family of stage actors, particularly in taishū engeki which translates to "theater for the masses" or "working-class Kabuki" in Ōita Prefecture. His troupe, Tachibana Kikutarou Gekidan, was founded by his grandparents and it was inherited by his uncle. At the age of three, he debuted in his uncle's theater and toured around the country for performances ever since. At an early age, his talent and skillfulness as an onnagata (female impersonator) labeled him as one of Heisei era's genius onnagata (平成の天才女形, Heisei no tensai onnagata).

== Film ==
In 2003, he had his screen debut in Takeshi Kitano’s Zatoichi: the Blind Swordsman (2003) as Seitaro Naruto under the disguise of a Geisha named Osei. His performance as Osei earned him the 13th Tokyo Sports Film Awards - Japanese Arts and Entertainment Division Grand Prize (第13回 東京スポーツ映画大賞 エンターテイメント部門 日本芸能大賞, Dai 13-kai Tōkyō supōtsu eiga taishō entāteimento bumon Nippon geinō taishō). His performance in the movie alongside Taichi Saotome (played the younger Osei), gained media interest. Though they are from different troupes, Taichi Saotome and Daigoro Tachibana often practiced and performed together. They are also widely known for their friendship. One of their major collaborations was in 2007 when their troupes had a joint production, Sennen no Inori, in which they played as a tragic couple and was successful in Japan and Hawaii.

== Press ==
Tachibana was also featured in several newspapers, magazines and TV shows most notably in Gokigenyo Shougekidan, D no Gekijo and guest performances in NHK's annual Kohaku Uta Gassen. In the magazine Jin, he was the navigator or the spokesperson in the column "What is Taishu Engeki?" in which he explains and discusses taishū engeki to the readers.

== The arts ==
Tachibana also appeared in major theatrical plays. In 2008, he was cast in a controversial revival of the theatrical play titled, Bakumatsu Junjou-den. It is a play with gender bending themes set in the eve of the Meiji era where the Shinsengumi existed. He starred with Satomi Ishihara and Takarazuka star Tsubasa Makoto. In 2010, he was cast in another major theatrical play titled Samurai 7. The play was based on the anime television series Samurai 7 which was adapted from Akira Kurosawa's critically acclaimed movie, The Seven Samurai.
In 2009, he officially entered the music industry as a professional enka singer being signed into Teichiku Records. He released a Maxi Single, Toki Gusuri which was composed by Kei Ogura and released two music videos.
Tachibana is known for his signing of contract with his agency to have no public photos of him without make-up and to have no romantic relationships until he reaches the age of twenty. He also stated that he had interest in baseball when he was young and once dreamed to become a professional baseball player.
In March 2011, just two months after his 24th birthday, he officially succeeded his uncle as the chairman of the troupe. Tachibana gained the title "Third Generation Chairman" of the Gekidan Tachibana Kikutarou.
