= Zatōichi (2003 film) =

2003 Japanese film by Takeshi Kitano

Zatoichi
- Japanese theatrical release poster
- Directed by: Takeshi Kitano
- Screenplay by: Takeshi Kitano
- Based on: Zatoichi by Kan Shimozawa
- Produced by: Masayuki Mori; Tsunehisa Saitō
- Starring: Takeshi Kitano; Tadanobu Asano; Yui Natsukawa
- Cinematography: Katsumi Yanagishima
- Edited by: Takeshi Kitano; Yoshinori Ota
- Music by: Keiichi Suzuki
- Production companies: Bandai Visual; Tokyo FM; Dentsu; TV Asahi; Saitō Entertainment; Office Kitano
- Distributed by: Shochiku; Miramax Films (United States)
- Release dates: 2 September 2003 (Venice); 6 September 2003 (Japan)
- Running time: 116 minutes
- Country: Japan
- Language: Japanese
- Box office: $34.2 million

Zatoichi (Japanese: 座頭市, Hepburn: Zatōichi) (released in the US as The Blind Swordsman: Zatoichi) is a 2003 Japanese jidaigeki action film, directed, written, co-edited by and starring Takeshi Kitano ("Beat" Takeshi) in his eleventh directorial venture. Kitano plays the role of the blind swordsman, with Tadanobu Asano, Michiyo Okusu, Yui Natsukawa, Guadalcanal Taka, Daigoro Tachibana, Yuko Daike, Ittoku Kishibe, Saburo Ishikura, and Akira Emoto in supporting roles.

A revival of the classic Zatoichi series of samurai film and television dramas, the film premiered on 2 September 2003 at the Venice International Film Festival, where it won the prestigious Silver Lion for Best Director award, and went on to numerous other awards both at home and abroad.

== Plot ==
The film's plot follows a traditional theme, with Zatoichi (a blind swordsman) coming to the defense of townspeople caught up in a local yakuza gang war and being forced to pay excessive amounts of protection money. Meanwhile, Zatoichi befriends a local farmer and her gambler nephew and eventually offers his assistance to two geisha siblings (one of whom is actually a man) who are seeking revenge for the murder of their parents. The siblings are the only survivors of a robbery and massacre that was carried out on their family estate ten years ago. They soon discover the people responsible for the murders are the same yakuza wreaking havoc on the small town.

After slicing his way through an army of henchmen with his sword, Zatoichi defeats the yakuza's bodyguard, a powerful rōnin, in a duel. Zatoichi later wanders into town and confronts the yakuza bosses, killing the second-in-command after surprising him by opening his eyes and blinding the elderly yakuza boss (who had been masquerading as a bumbling old waiter up until this point). The film ends with a dance number led by noted Japanese tap dance troupe The Stripes, and Zatoichi walking down a trail and tripping over a rock, saying: "Even with my eyes wide open, I can't see anything."

== Cast ==
- Takeshi Kitano as Zatoichi
- Tadanobu Asano as the rōnin Hattori Gennosuke
- Michiyo Okusu as Aunt O-ume, the farmer
- Yui Natsukawa as O-shino, Hattori's wife
- Daigoro Tachibana as O-sei
- Taichi Saotome as young O-sei
- Yūko Daike as O-kinu, sister of Osei.
- Guadalcanal Taka as Shinkichi, gambler nephew of Oume.
- Ittoku Kishibe as Ginzo, gang leader
- Saburo Ishikura as Ogiya, gang leader
- Akira Emoto as "Pops", tavern owner

== Production ==
Kitano revealed that he was approached by others to create the film, and therefore differed from his own techniques, following the common filmmaking process in order to please them and make a pure-entertainment film.

This film marks Kitano's first collaboration with composer Keiichi Suzuki, ending an eleven-year streak with Joe Hisaishi. The director said he made the decision feeling that the film needed percussion-based music, and that Hisaishi is not a flexible composer, and also suggested that Hisaishi had become too expensive for him. Costumes were created by Kazuko Kurosawa.

Kitano used digital technology to increase the gore of the fights.

== Reception ==
=== Box office ===
The film grossed US$23.8 million in Japan.

=== Critical response ===
On review aggregation website Rotten Tomatoes, Zatoichi had a approval rating of 87% based on 127 reviews and an average rating of 7.2/10. The website's critical consensus states: "Colorful, rich with action and wonderfully choreographed, Takeshi Kitano takes on the classic samurai character with his own brand of cinematic flair". Metacritic assigned the film a weighted average score of 75 out of 100, based on 33 critics, indicating "generally favourable reviews".

Peter Bradshaw of The Guardian gave Zatoichi four out of five stars. Jasper Sharp of Midnight Eye praised the film as "pure cinematic magic". Allan Tong of Exclaim! said: "When Zatoichi is on screen, the film erupts with brilliant fury in unforgettable action sequences". The Washington Post praised the film, while comparing it to Yojimbo, Sanjuro and Lone Wolf and Cub: Sword of Vengeance.

== Awards ==
- 2003, September 6, Venice Film Festival, Silver Lion for Best Direction, Venice
- 2003, Audience Award Leone Del Pubblico, Venice
- 2003, September 14, 28th International Toronto International Film Festival, Audience Award AGF People's Choice Award, Toronto
- 2003, London Film Festival
- 2004, February 20, Japan Academy Prize, Outstanding Achievement in Film Editing, Outstanding Achievement in Music, Outstanding Achievement in Cinematography, Outstanding Achievement in Lighting Direction, Outstanding Achievement in Sound Recording, Tokyo
