= Virtual JFK =

- Theatrical release poster
- Directed by: Koji Masutani
- Written by: James G. Blight; Janet M. Lang; Koji Masutani; David A. Welch
- Produced by: Peter O. Almond; James G. Blight; Pamela Hogan; Janet M. Lang; Koji Masutani; Michael Paszt; David A. Welch
- Music by: Joshua Kern
- Distributed by: International Film Circuit
- Release dates: April 23, 2008 (Hotdocs Film Festival); September 17, 2008
- Running time: 80 minutes
- Country: United States
- Language: English

Virtual JFK: Vietnam if Kennedy Had Lived is a 2008 documentary film by Koji Masutani. It applies what Niall Ferguson of Harvard University has called 'virtual history' to consider what President John F. Kennedy might have done in Vietnam if he had not been assassinated in 1963. The film was unveiled at the 2008 HotDocs Canadian International Documentary Film Festival, and its theatrical premiere took place at New York City's Film Forum six weeks before the 2008 U.S. presidential election.

== Cast ==
- James G. Blight (Narrator)
- Hubert H. Humphrey as himself (U.S. Senator, Minnesota)
- Lyndon B. Johnson as himself (Vice President of the United States)
- John F. Kennedy as himself (President of the United States)
- Robert S. McNamara as himself (Secretary of Defense)

== Awards and reception ==
- The film was nominated for "'Special Jury Prize'" and "'Best International Feature Documentary'" Hot Docs Canadian International Documentary Festival 2008.
- The film won the "'Golden Palm Award'" at the 2009 Mexico International Film Festival.
- The film was nominated for "'Best Documentary 2009'" at the Norwich Film Festival.
- The film won the "'Aloha Accolade Award for Excellence in Filmmaking'" at the 2010 Honolulu International Film Festival.
- Official Selection at the 2008 Fort Lauderdale International Film Festival
- Official Selection at the 2008 Lone Star International Film Festival
- Official Selection at the 2008 Bergen International Film Festival
- Official Selection at the 2009 London International Documentary Festival
- Official Selection at the 2009 Gasparilla International Film Festival

== See also ==
- Cultural depictions of John F. Kennedy
