= Ōten no Mon =

Japanese manga series

- First tankōbon volume cover

応天の門
- Genre: Drama; Historical; Suspense
- Manga
- Written by: Yak Haibara
- Published by: Shinchosha
- Imprint: Bunch Comics
- Magazine: Monthly Comic Bunch (2013–2024); Comic Bunch Kai (2024–present)
- Original run: October 21, 2013 – present
- Volumes: 21

Ōten no Mon (応天の門; lit. 'The Southern Gate') is a Japanese manga series written and illustrated by Yak Haibara. It began serialization in Shinchosha's seinen manga magazine Monthly Comic Bunch in October 2013.

== Plot ==
During the era when the Fujiwara clan was gradually seizing real power in the imperial court, rumors were rampant among the nobles of Heian-kyō that maids were disappearing night after night from the Fujiwara clan's residence. The nobles whispered that this was the work of an Oni, and the rumors eventually reached the ears of the Emperor. Ariwara no Narihira, who was in charge of guarding the capital, received an imperial order and began searching for the culprit. However, when his friend Kino Haseo was arrested as the culprit in the maid abduction, Narihira, who wanted to prove his innocence, asked for the cooperation of Sugawara no Michizane, Haseo's classmate whom he encountered at the scene of Haseo's arrest. Together with Michizane, who reluctantly promised to cooperate, they continued the search for the culprit.

After finally solving the case of the missing maid at the end of their investigation, Narihira and Michizane continue to uncover the bizarre incidents occurring in Heiankyo one by one, but they gradually become entangled in the power struggle between the Fujiwara and Tomo clans, who are involved in the background of the cases.

== Media ==
=== Manga ===
Written and illustrated by Yak Haibara, Ōten no Mon began serialization in Shinchosha's seinen manga magazine Monthly Comic Bunch on October 21, 2013. The series' chapters have been compiled into twenty-one tankōbon volumes as of January 2026.

No.	Release date	ISBN
1	April 9, 2014	978-4-10-771742-9
2	October 9, 2014	978-4-10-771777-1
3	April 9, 2015	978-4-10-771810-5
4	October 9, 2015	978-4-10-771846-4
5	March 9, 2016	978-4-10-771883-9
6	November 9, 2016	978-4-10-771930-0
7	June 9, 2017	978-4-10-771987-4
8	December 9, 2017	978-4-10-772034-4
9	July 9, 2018	978-4-10-772101-3
10	December 7, 2018	978-4-10-772143-3
11	July 9, 2019	978-4-10-772203-4
12	February 7, 2020	978-4-10-772258-4
13	September 9, 2020	978-4-10-772320-8
14	March 9, 2021	978-4-10-772371-0
15	November 9, 2021	978-4-10-772445-8
16	November 9, 2022	978-4-10-772544-8
17	March 9, 2023	978-4-10-772584-4
18	November 9, 2023	978-4-10-772666-7
19	July 9, 2024	978-4-10-772732-9
20	April 9, 2025	978-4-10-772815-9; 978-4-10-772816-6 (SE)
21	January 9, 2026	978-4-10-772905-7

=== Stage play ===
A stage play adaptation featuring Takarazuka Revue performers Kanato Tsukishiro, Mitsuki Umino, and An Hōzuki was held at the Takarazuka Grand Theater from February 4 to March 6, 2023, and the Tokyo Takarazuka Theater from March 25 to April 30 that same year.

Another stage play adaptation featuring Ryuji Sato, Katsunori Takahashi, and Mari Hanafusa was held at Meiji-za in December 2024.

== Reception ==
The series was ranked 10th in the Nationwide Bookstore Employees' Recommended Comics in 2016. The series, alongside Jasmin and Tsuki ni Hoeran nee, also won the New Face Award at the 20th Japan Media Arts Festival in 2017.

By June 2022, the series had 1.5 million copies in circulation. By June 2024, the series had over 2.3 million copies in circulation.
