= Taichi Saotome =

Japanese actor and singer

- 早乙女太一
- Born: Taichi Nishimura (西村太一); 24 September 1991 (age 34); Dazaifu, Fukuoka, Japan
- Other name: The Sidelong Glance Prince
- Occupations: Actor, singer
- Years active: 1995–present
- Spouse: Maki Nishiyama (m. 2013; div. 2019)
- Website: taichisaotome.jp

Taichi Nishimura (西村太一, Nishimura Taichi; born 24 September 1991), also known as Taichi Saotome (早乙女太一, Saotome Taichi), is a Japanese actor and singer. He played young men and onnagata roles of women.

== Biography ==
His father is the head of the theatre troupe Gekidan Sujaku. Saotome performed in taishū engeki. A "female impersonator", he has performed onstage. In Zatoichi, he played the child disguising himself as a geisha (Daigoro Tachibana). Though in a different troupe from Tachibana, they frequently practiced and performed together. In Takeshis', Saotome played a young female impersonator and dancer. He played a bishōnen aesthetic, i.e. graceful, beautiful young men. He played Mori Ranmaru in a National Museum event called "Sengoku Fantasy", and played a young Horibe Yasubee in the NHK New Year's jidaigeki play. He created his official fan club in 2006. He said that he misunderstand his appeal, but is happy about his role. He appeared in the variety show D no Gekijō in January 2007. It was arranged he reprised a role, a dance in a flower-decorated kimono at the Taishōkan. The performance ended the next day. Saotome has expressed a desire to play men's roles and to perform in more mainstream or traditional theatre, saying he has less care for female roles. He starred in the stage production of the otome game, Hakuouki in October 2010. He played vice commander, Hijikata Toshizo of Shinsengumi.

== Filmography ==
=== Film ===
- Zatoichi (2003), Young O-Sei
- Takeshis' (2005), Unnamed young man
- Shabake (2007), Suzuhiko-hime
- Anmitsu Hime (2008), Sandayu Momoyama
- Crows Explode (2014), Ryohei Kagami
- Road To High&Low (2016), Ryu Tatsuhito
- High&Low The Movie (2016), Ryu Tatsuhito
- High&Low The Red Rain (2016), Ryu Tatsuhito
- Memoirs of a Murderer (2017), Toda
- Bleach (2018), Renji Abarai
- Shottan, The Miracle (2018), Daisuke Katō
- Iwane: Sword of Serenity (2019), Kuniemon
- Promare (2019), Lio Fotia (voice)
- Last of the Wolves (2021), Masaru Hanada
- Baian the Assassin, M.D. (2023), Ishikawa Tomogorō
- Dangerous Cops: Home Coming (2024), Takumi Kaidō
- Maru (2024), Tsuchiya
- Paris ni Saku Étoile (2026), Ruslan (voice)

=== Television ===
- Fūrin Kazan (2007) – Hōjō Ujimasa
- Shinzanmono (2010) – Kazuhiro Uesugi
- Miss Double Faced Teacher (2012) – Tatsuya Sudo
- Nobunaga Concerto (2014) – Danzo
- Futagashira (2015–2016) – Soji
- High&Low: The Story of S.W.O.R.D. (2015–2016) – Ryu Tatsuhito
- Nobunaga Moyu (2016) – Nobutada Oda
- Cold Case 2 (2018)
- Boukyaku no Sachiko: A Meal Makes Her Forget (2018) – Shungo
- Tokyo Bachelors (2019) – Ritsuki Itoi
- Come Come Everybody (2021–22) – Tommy
- Last Samurai Standing (2025) – Adashino Shikura
- Blood and Sweat (2026) – Hirofumi Tanaka
