= Saburo Ishikura =

Japanese actor (born 1946)

Saburo Ishikura (石倉 三郎 Ishikura Saburō, born December 16, 1946, in Kagawa, Japan) is a Japanese actor that has acted in several movies directed by Beat Takeshi. He has also appeared in a few of Takeshi's recent films which include Zatoichi (2003) as Boss Ogi and Asakusa Kid (2002).

He has also made guest appearances in Gaki No Tsukai Batsu Games. Specifically 2008's Newspaper Agency as a man in a oversize bag and 2009's Hotel in a golf bag.

== Filmography ==
=== Film ===
- The Catch (1983), Kishimoto
- Asakusa Kid (2002)
- Zatōichi (2003), Boss Ogi
- Go! Go! Sakura Club (2023), Kikuo Hanada
- The Scoop (2024), Yamamoto
- Unforgettable (2025)

=== Television ===
- Aoi (2000), Aoyama Tadatoshi
- Boogie Woogie (2023), Kazuichi Jirōmaru
