= Taishū engeki =

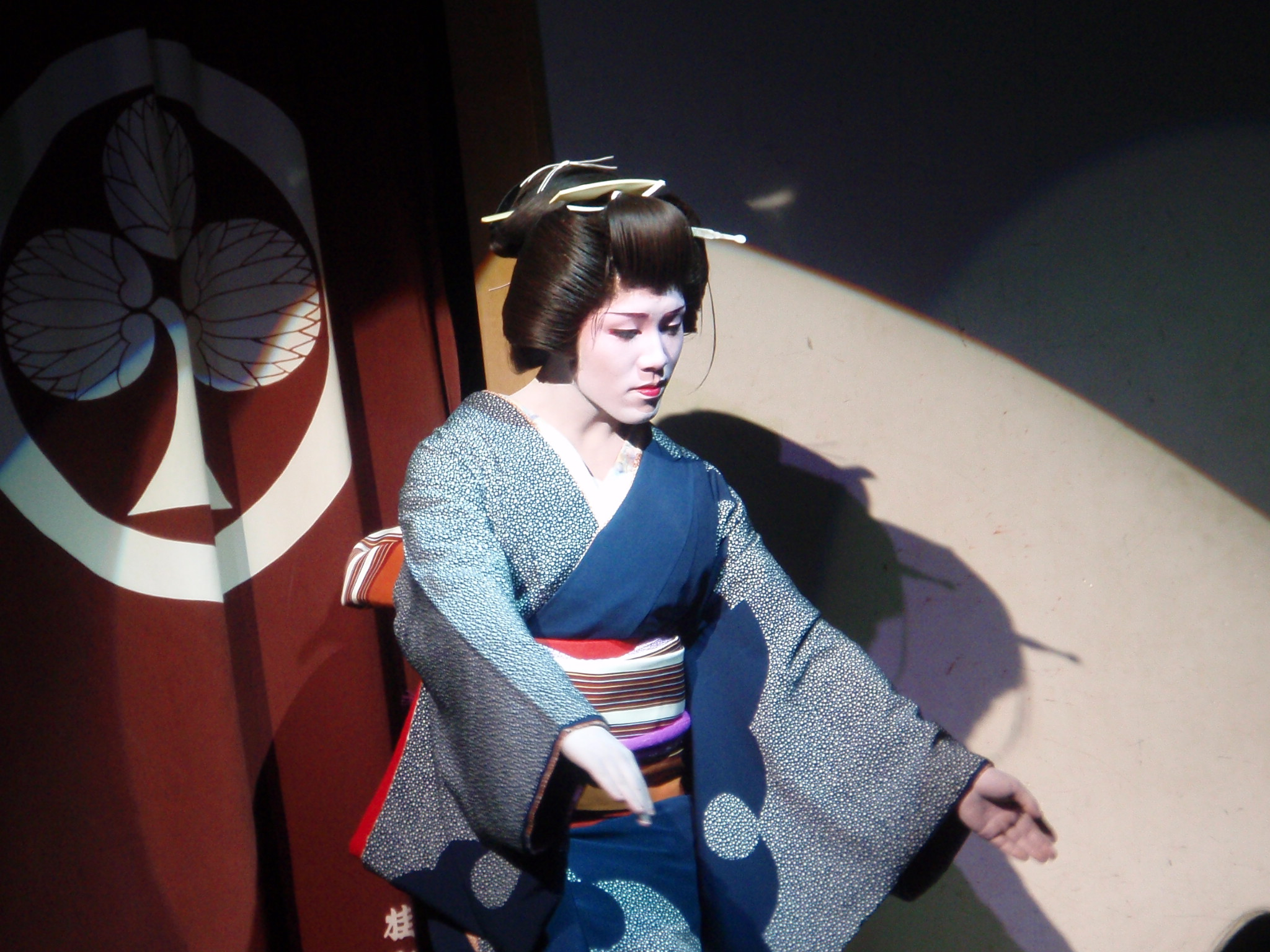
Popular onnagata (specialist in female roles) Tachibana Daigorō dancing in a performance at the Miyoshibashi Theatre in Yokohama, November 2007. His crest, or teimon, can be seen on the red curtain behind him.

Taishū engeki (大衆演劇, lit. "theatre of/for the masses") is a genre of popular theatre in Japan, frequently described as "light theatre", and compared to forms such as musical theatre and the revue.

Though different interpretations and definitions abound, the chief distinguishing feature of taishū engeki is the notion that it is intended as entertainment for regular people. The form does not purport itself to be high art, nor to contain deep or powerful philosophical or political themes or messages. Taishū engeki troupes tend not to be connected with a single theatre, but travel, performing at small local theatres, community centers and the like. Ticket prices are relatively low compared with the major forms of urban theatre, such as kabuki, opera, and Broadway musicals, and efforts are made to inspire a feeling of closeness between the audience and the performers.

== Terminology ==
The term taishū engeki, literally meaning "theatre of/for the masses," came to be applied to the genre to distinguish it from the more traditional of Japan's theatrical arts, such as kabuki, bunraku, and Noh. Though kabuki, bunraku, and many other pre-modern forms of Japanese performing arts were originally entertainment for the peasantry or commoner classes, they have since come to be seen as "traditional arts," and have come to bear an importance and air of high culture which the taishū engeki form is not granted.

As a result of its literal meaning, the term "taishū engeki" is both vague and controversial. The form is a more specific and singular one than the generic term of "mass theatre" might imply. Furthermore, there are those within the sphere of taishū engeki who object to the plebeian denotation of the word taishū (the masses).

Nevertheless, for lack of a better term, the moniker of taishū engeki continues to be widely used.

== Style ==
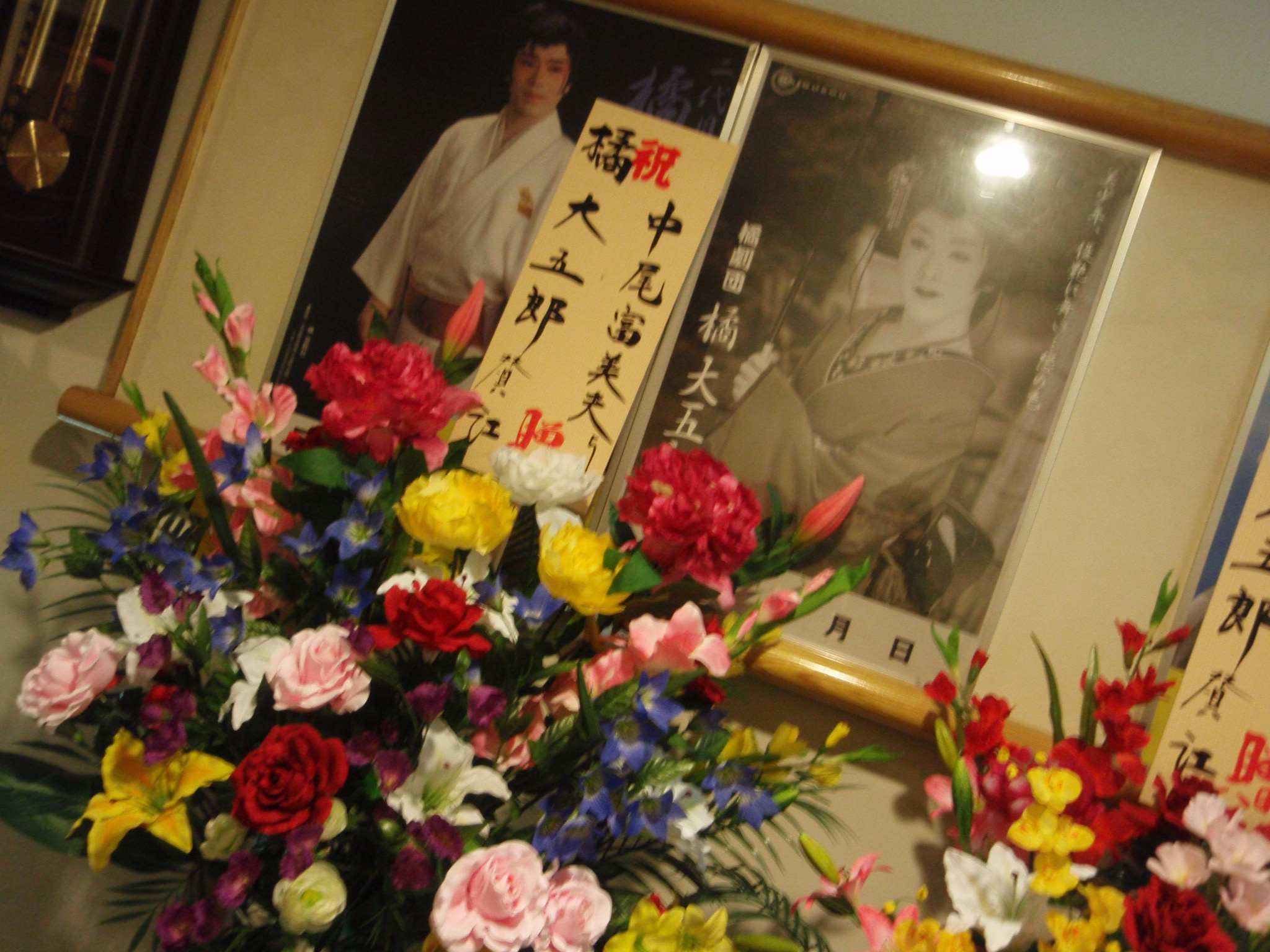
Bouquets of flowers given by fans to Tachibana Daigorō, for a performance at the Miyoshibashi Theatre in Yokohama in November 2007.

Taishū engeki performances are generally split into two sections. A short play or skit will feature most of the troupe in a brief story, often set in the Edo period (in which kabuki and bunraku are also set), and featuring human interest elements (see sewamono) as well as sword fights and historical or samurai themes (see jidaimono). This is followed by a series of dance numbers with no connection to the plot or characters of the previous skit, each performer appearing on stage alone, one at a time. The performers wear traditional-style kimono and over-the-top make-up, dancing to enka, a genre of melodramatic music akin to lounge music; fog machines and various lighting effects add to the flashiness of the dance numbers.

Taishū engeki shares much in common with the Takarazuka form, and with the more traditional kabuki, but unlike these forms which employ all-female and all-male troupes respectively, taishū engeki features performers of both sexes; young men frequently play female parts, though women rarely play men.

The style of costumes and make-up is closely related to that of kabuki, and uses porcelain white faces, bright red lips, and emphasized eyes and eyebrows to create an overall aesthetic of unreal, stylized beauty.

One of the primary distinguishing features of taishū engeki is the devotion and passion of its fans, and the relative lack of distance between performers and audience. Troupes sell various merchandise in the aisles during intermission, ranging from DVDs of their performances to calendars and photo books, and gather outside the venue following the show to sign autographs, and to exchange greetings and take photographs with fans. This is in contrast to many other forms of theatre in Japan and abroad where audience members have very little direct interaction with performers, who do not leave the stage for the aisles, and who slip out a rear door of the venue following the performance.

It is not uncommon for taishū engeki fans to present their favorite performers with personalized letters and gifts, most frequently large elaborate bouquets of flowers or simply cash, in a custom called go-shūgi (ご祝儀), meaning "congratulations". Fans approach the stage during the dance portion of the show, and slip a letter, envelope, or 10,000-yen bill into the performer's kimono or obi (belt), shaking hands or exchanging a quick word with the performer as he stops dancing to kneel down at the edge of the stage to receive the fan.

== Actors ==
There are currently estimated to be over 100 taishū engeki troupes in Japan, each made up of fewer than twenty performers. Leadership of a troupe, and rank within it, is passed down in a hereditary fashion, and members of a troupe generally share a family name, though performers are quite frequently adopted into a family troupe, and may not be related by blood. It is also not uncommon for the sons of troupe leaders to branch off and begin their own troupes. Troupes, and individual performers, as in kabuki, wield individual crests or teimon which are displayed on banners, theatre curtains, and sometimes on costumes.

Taichi Saotome and Daigorō Tachibana are two of the most popular current actors.
