= Roots of the Cuban Missile Crisis =

2001 film by Alita Holly

- Directed by: Alita Holly
- Production company: New Line Home Video
- Release date: 2001
- Running time: 48 minutes

Roots of the Cuban Missile Crisis is a 48-minute 2001 Cold War documentary by New Line Home Video with "film footage from the era [and] newly created interviews covering U.S./Soviet relations from post-WWII Europe through the end of the crisis". The documentary is a "Beyond the Movie feature" on the infinifilm DVD for the movie Thirteen Days and synthesizes archival footage and still photography, interviews, Trinity and Beyond documentary scenes, and Thirteen Days movie scenes and sequences (many with archival footage).

Topics regarding the crisis' roots covered by the film include the 1938 Munich Agreement, Yalta Conference, British withdrawal from Greece & Turkey, Berlin Airlift, Bomber Gap, Kennedy-Nixon Debate, Cuban Revolution, Missile Gap, Bay of Pigs Invasion, and Crateology. The last third of the film covers events of the crisis (e.g., Operation Ortsac, EXCOMM, Kennedy Presidential recordings) and includes film dramatized scenes from Thirteen Days.

== Production staff and interviewees ==
- Director: Alita Renee Holly
- Producers: Alita Renee Holly & Elizabeth Westwood
- Editor: Carol Oblath
- Dino Brugioni — CIA photographic interpreter
- Sam Donaldson — ABC News
- Raymond L. Garthoff — Brookings Institution
- Marvin Kalb — CBS News Moscow bureau chief
- Herbert Kaplow — NBC/ABC News correspondent
- Sergei Khrushchev — son of Nikita Khrushchev
- Prof. Ernest R. May — Harvard University
- Pierre Salinger — Kennedy Administration press secretary
- David Self --Thirteen Days screenwriter
- Tad Szulc — Fidel Castro biographer
- Helen Thomas — Hearst Newspapers columnist
- Helen Westwood — ABC News London bureau chief
- Prof. Philip Zelikow — director of The Miller Center, UVA

== See also ==
- Cultural depictions of John F. Kennedy
