= Kotomi Kyono =

Japanese actress

- 京野ことみ
- Born: October 18, 1978 (age 47); Fukuyama, Hiroshima, Japan
- Occupations: Actress, J-Pop singer
- Years active: 1992–present

Kotomi Kyono (京野ことみ, Kyōno Kotomi; born 18 October 1978) is a Japanese actress and occasional J-Pop singer (making her debut on 20 November 1992). She was born in Fukuyama, Hiroshima, Japan.

She has appeared in numerous TV series, including the 1999 drama Ring: The Final Chapter (Ring: Saishûshô).

== Filmography ==
=== Films ===
- Labyrinth of Dreams (1997)
- Leaving (1997)
- Messengers (1999)
- 9 Souls (2003)
- Takeshis' (2005)
- Maiko Haaaan!!! (2007)
- Ai no Komuragaeri (2023)

=== Television ===
- Hakusen Nagashi (1996), Madoka
- Hakusen Nagashi: Spring at Age 19 (1997), Madoka
- Shomuni (1998), Sawako Tsukahara
- Hakusen Nagashi: The Wind at Age 20 (1999), Madoka
- Shomuni Second Season (2000), Sawako Tsukahara
- Hakusen Nagashi: The Poem of Travels (2001), Madoka
- Hakusen Nagashi: Age 25 (2003), Madoka
- Shomuni Final Season (2003), Sawako Tsukahara
- Hakusen Nagashi: The Final: Even as the Times of Dreaming have Passed (2005), Madoka
- Shomuni 2013 (2013), Sawako Tsukahara

== Discography ==
Single:

- 20 November 1992 Now! (PCDA-00387) c/w Watashi no Everyday
