= Katsuya (actor) =

Japanese actor

- 勝矢
- Born: Hideto Katsuya; 8 May 1975 (age 51); Hyōgo Prefecture, Japan
- Occupations: Actor; voice actor
- Agent: LDH
- Known for: Ashita no Joe; Thermae Romae
- Spouse: Suzuho Makaze (m. 2024)
- Website: Official profile

Hideto Katsuya (勝矢 秀人, Katsuya Hideto; born 8 May 1975), professionally known as Katsuya (勝矢), is a Japanese actor and voice actor. He is represented by LDH.

== Biography ==
Katsuya is the youngest son in his family. He learned football when he was in elementary school. When he moved to Tokyo at the age of 22, he had a part-time job as a construction assistant.

He said that his great-grandfather came from the Netherlands to Japan during the Meiji period in order to sell jewelry.

On 27 September 2024, he announced through his agency that he married Suzuho Makaze, a former Takarazuka Revue actress.

== Filmography ==
=== TV series ===
Year	Title	Role	Notes	Ref.
2022	Short Program	Mr. Tanabe	Episode 9	
2024–27	Golden Kamuy: The Hunt of Prisoners in Hokkaido / Karafuto Pursuit Arc	Tatsuuma Ushiyama	2 seasons	
2025	Masked Ninja Akakage	Oninenbou		

=== Films ===
Year	Title	Role	Notes	Ref.
2011	Ashita no Joe	Hirokazu Nishi (Mammoth Nishi)		
2012	Thermae Romae	Markus Pietras		
2014	Thermae Romae II	Markus Pietras		
2016	Twisted Justice	Takuma Urushibara		
2018	The Blood of Wolves	Sekitori		
2022	The Y-Team	Hiroki Saito		
2023	Bad City	Kumamoto		
2024	Golden Kamuy	Tatsuuma Ushiyama		
2024	Sin and Evil			
2025	Salary Man Kintaro 2			
2025	Isolated	Hiroki Saito		
2026	Golden Kamuy: The Abashiri Prison Raid	Tatsuuma Ushiyama		
2026	Kingdom 5: The Clash of Souls	Han Ming		
2026	The Thorn of Sin	Kuniaki Todo		
2026	The Y-Team 2	Saito		

=== Video games ===
Year	Title	Role	Notes	Ref.
2023	Like a Dragon Gaiden: The Man Who Erased His Name	Agent Saigo		

=== Dubbing ===
Year	Title	Role	Notes	Ref.
2021	Encanto	Félix Madrigal		
