= Ernest in Love =

- Original Cast Recording
- Music: Lee Pockriss
- Lyrics: Anne Croswell
- Book: Anne Croswell
- Basis: Oscar Wilde's play The Importance of Being Earnest
- Productions: 1960 Off-Broadway; 2009 Off-Broadway

Ernest in Love is a musical with a book and lyrics by Anne Croswell and music by Lee Pockriss. It is based on The Importance of Being Earnest, Oscar Wilde's classic 1895 comedy of manners.

== Background ==
The two-act musical is an expanded version of the hour-long musical Who's Earnest? televised on The United States Steel Hour in 1957.

The 1959-1960 Off-Broadway season included a dozen musicals and revues including Little Mary Sunshine, The Fantasticks (based on an obscure 1894 work by Edmond Rostand, of Cyrano fame), and Ernest in Love, a musicalization of Oscar Wilde's 1895 hit. The production was directed by Harold Stone and choreographed by Frank Derbas. It opened on May 4, 1960, at the Gramercy Arts Theatre, where it was warmly received by the critics but ran for only 103 performances. The cast included Louis Edmonds as Algernon, John Irving as Jack, Leila Martin as Gwendolen, Gerrianne Raphael as Cecily, Sara Seegar as Lady Bracknell, Lucy Landau as Miss Prism, George Hall as Dr. Chausable, Christina Gillespie as Effie, and Alan Shayne as Lane. It was then revived thereafter in stock and amateur productions, at least into the early 1960s.

An original cast recording was released by Columbia Records. In 2003, a compact disc transfer was issued on the DRG label.

The Japanese all-female musical theatre troupe Takarazuka Revue staged the musical in 2005 in two productions, one by Moon Troupe (featuring the debut of Jun Sena and Kanami Ayano) the other one by Flower Troupe (the last production for Sakiho Juri for the company), and the other one by Flower Troupe (led by Rio Asumi and featuring the debut of Maria Kano).

In 2010, an Off Broadway revival of Earnest in Love was presented by the Irish Repertory Theatre.

== Synopsis ==
Act I

In Victorian era London, tradesmen and valets debate the upper class's failure to pay their bills on time, with the tradesmen accusing, and the valets fervently defending, their employers ("Come Raise Your Cup"). Lane, a valet, returns home to find his master, Ernest Worthing, rehearsing the proper words to say to Miss Gwendolen Fairfax, to whom he intends to propose that afternoon ("How Do You Find the Words?"). Gwendolen, meanwhile, with the help of her maid Alice, is searching for "The Hat" that will impress Mr. Worthing enough to elicit a proposal.

Ernest visits his friend Algernon Moncrieff, who accuses him of leading a double-life. While in the country, where he lives, Ernest goes by the name of Jack (which he believes to be his real name) and pretends that he has a wastrel brother named Ernest, who lives in London and requires his frequent attention. Jack must assume a serious attitude for the benefit of his young ward, Cecily, an 18-year-old heiress and granddaughter of Jack's late adoptive father. When in the city, he becomes the profligate Ernest. Algernon explains to Jack that he has an imaginary friend named Bunbury who lives in the country and is frequently in ill health: whenever Algernon wants to avoid an unwelcome social obligation, or just get away for the weekend, he "visits his sick friend". He calls this delightful practice "Bunburying" ("Mr. Bunbury").

Gwendolen and her mother Lady Bracknell come to call, and Jack proposes to Gwendolen ("Perfection"). She joyously accepts, but Jack is worried that Gwendolen seems to love him largely for his name, Ernest, which she thinks the most beautiful name in the world. In addition, Gwendolen's mother, the terrifying Lady Bracknell, does not approve of Ernest and is further horrified to learn that he was adopted as a baby after being discovered in a handbag at a railway station ("A Handbag is not a Proper Mother"). She advises him to find one or both parents before the season is out. Meanwhile, Jack's description of his pretty ward Cecily has so appealed to Algernon that he resolves to meet her, in spite of Jack's firm opposition.

Assuming the identity of Ernest, Algernon visits Jack's house in the country. Cecily has for some time imagined herself in love with the mysterious Ernest, whom Jack has told her is "A Wicked Man". Her governess, Miss Prism, is easily distracted by the attentions of the clergyman Dr. Chasuble ("Metaphorically Speaking"). Jack, meanwhile, has decided to put his life as Ernest behind him. He is forced to abandon his intention to declare that his brother Ernest has died in Paris by the presence of Algernon in the role of "Ernest", who threatens to expose Jack's double life if the latter doesn't play along.

Act II

Lane, the valet, and Cecily's maid Effie, lament the way the upper classes make love so difficult ("You Can't Make Love"); as servants, they find it much easier together. Cecily is swept off her feet by Algernon, and she accepts his proposal ("Lost"). Cecily admits to her "Ernest" that she loves him at least in part for his name. Algernon and Jack, unbeknownst to each other, each ask the local rector, Rev Canon Chasuble, to be baptised as "Ernest".

Gwendolen flees London and her mother to be with her love. When she and Cecily meet for the first time, she declares that she can always recognize a lady and knows immediately that she and Cecily will be great friends ("My Very First Impression"). Upon discussing their engagements, though, each indignantly insists that she is the one engaged to "Ernest". This results in verbal conflict until Jack and Algernon appear and their deceptions are exposed. Since neither is named Ernest, the girls renounce their engagements and walk away, their noses in the air. Jack deplores their situation, but Algernon calmly consumes his tea ("The Muffin Song").

The couples soon reconcile when the girls learn of Jack and Algernon's plans to be christened. They all swear "Eternal Devotion". Lady Bracknell arrives in pursuit of her daughter. She meets Cecily and finds her as a suitable wife for Algernon, especially when the amount in her trust fund is revealed. However, Lady Bracknell still refuses to countenance Jack's marriage to Gwendolen, while he, in retaliation, denies his consent to the marriage of his heiress ward Cecily to her penniless nephew Algernon ("The Muffin Song (reprise)").

The impasse is broken by the appearance of Cecily's governess, Miss Prism. As she and Lady Bracknell recognize each other with horror, it is revealed that, when working many years previously as a nursemaid for Lady Bracknell's late sister, Miss Prism had disappeared with the sister's child, a baby boy. Miss Prism reveals that, in a moment of distraction, she had placed the baby in a handbag and put the manuscript of a novel she had been writing in the perambulator. The handbag was left at Victoria station and, when she realised her mistake, Miss Prism had fled. When Jack produces the handbag in which he was found, it becomes clear that he is Lady Bracknell's nephew and Algernon's older brother.

Dr. Chasuble remembers that Jack was named after his father, Ernest John. Jack, now truly Ernest, receives Gwendolen's forgiveness for the fact that he has been telling the truth all along. The happy couples embrace, including Miss Prism and her clerical admirer, the Reverend Canon Chasuble ("Ernest in Love").

== Songs ==
Act I

- Come Raise Your Cup - Lane, Perkins, tradesmen
- How Do You Find the Words? - Jack
- The Hat - Gwendolyn, Alice
- Mr. Bunbury - Algernon, Jack
- Perfection - Jack, Gwendolyn
- A Handbag is Not a Proper Mother - Lady Bracknell, Jack
- Mr. Bunbury (Reprise) - Algernon
- A Wicked Man - Cecily
- Metaphorically Speaking - Miss Prism, Dr. Chasuble
- A Wicked Man (Reprise)

Act II

- You Can't Make Love - Lane, Effie
- Lost - Algernon, Cecily
- My Very First Impression - Gwendolyn, Cecily
- The Muffin Song - Jack, Algernon
- Eternal Devotion - Gwendolyn, Cecily
- A Handbag is Not a Proper Mother (Reprise)
- The Muffin Song (Reprise) - Jack, Algernon, Gwendolyn, Cecily
- Ernest In Love - Company

== Critical reception ==
In his review of the original 1960 production, Brooks Atkinson of The New York Times wrote that "Everything has been done in the most impeccable taste...Lee Pockriss's music is deft and droll. Ann Croswell's book and lyrics are clever...the whole performance radiates sly good nature." Richard Watts, Jr. of the New York Post pronounced Ernest in Love "charming...a fresh and likable musical show..excellently played." In the New York Herald Tribune, Judith Crist declared that "It has all the charm and pleasure of a spring bouquet."

In reviewing the 2010 revival, The Wall Street Journal theater critic Terry Teachout said Earnest in Love was "presented with bewitching finesse. ... The Irish Rep's revival, the first of any significance ever to be mounted in New York, is so endearing that I can't help wonder why so delightful a show disappeared for so long." Teachout stated that the writers "managed between them to put a fresh and personal spin on "Earnest": They shifted the emphasis from Wilde's epigrams to his pretty-young-things-in-love plot. ... No, it's not Wilde, but if you can keep from breaking out in a cheek-to-cheek grin when Jack Worthing ... launches into a neat little soft shoe in the first scene, you're just a sour old crock." He noted that, while "the music is craftsmanlike but not quite memorable", the show "works flawlessly on its own modest terms."
