= Yu Todoroki =

Yu Todoroki (轟 悠 Todoroki Yū) is a former member of Takarazuka Revue. As an otokoyaku (player of male roles), she joined the revue in 1985, became the top star of Snow Troupe in 1997, before transferring to Superior Members (Senka) in 2002. In 2003, she became the youngest member to serve on the company's board of directors. Todoroki stepped down from her position as member of the board of directors on July 18, 2020, and functions now as a special advisor. In 2021, she resigned from the company and retired from the entertainment world.

She is from Hitoyoshi, Kumamoto Prefecture. Her birthday is August 11.

Todoroki typically took on the roles of morally grey, charismatic men, who have a historic background or are actual historical figures. Notable roles include: Luigi Lucheni (Elisabeth), Ravic (Arch of Triumph), Rhett Butler(Gone with the Wind), Abraham Lincoln (For The People) and Ernesto "Che" Guevara (Che Guevara).

== Troupe history ==
- Moon Troupe: 1985–1988
- Snow Troupe: 1988–2002
- Superior Member: 2002–2021

== General information ==
Todoroki is often considered to be one of the most notable actresses in Takarazuka history, partially due to her 37 year history with the company.

Todoroki Yu's ability to portray men in a realistic fashion, as opposed to the "ideal man" approach otokoyaku usually take, has been the key to her success. This manliness is also the reason, why even off-stage Todoroki's gender has caused some confusion. Michael Kunze and his wife, the dog of a fellow actress, as well as some French men reportedly perceived Todoroki Yu as male.

Debuting in Moon Troupe in 1985, she gained popularity when she was transferred to Snow Troupe in 1988. Like her juniors who went on to become top stars, such as Yōka Wao and Jun Sena, she was a solid "second man" to Fubuki Takane, her top star superior. Upon the resignation of Takane in 1997, she became Snow Troupes top star.

During her time as Snow Troupes top star, she became the third top star to be partnered with legendary top musumeyaku Mari Hanafusa, but their time together was short due to the formation of the Cosmos Troupe in 1998, when both Hanafusa and Todoroki's "second man" Yōka Wao were transferred to the new troupe.

After a four year run as Snow Troupe top star, when Hitomi Tsukikage, her top partner, resigned from the company, she considered resigning as well. However, Yachiyo Kasugano, Todoroki's teacher (member of the theater since 1929; with the company until her death in 2012), persuaded her to stay. With this, she became the second top star in the company's history to resign from top star status but remain in the company by joining the Superior Members group (Yuri Haruna is the first case). Following this, she continued to make special appearances in both the Grand Theater performances and small-theatre productions of other troupes until her resignation in 2021. In 2003, also upon the invitation of Yachiyo Kasugano, she became a member of the Takarazuka Board of Directors. She is the youngest to serve on the board of directors in the company's history.

In 2008, she joined Cosmos Troupe for the musical A Morning Breeze, based on the life of Jiro Shirasu. This was the first time she had appeared in a Cosmos production since the troupe's establishment in 1998 and made her one of the few actresses who has participated the productions of all five troupes within the company.

The Cuban embassy commended her portrayal of Ernesto Guevara in the musical Che Guevara.

She enjoys painting and has held exhibitions for her works 6 times.

In addition to stage performances, she has held two concerts; Stylish! (Aoyama Theater) in 2002 and Lavender Monologue (Takarazuka Bow Hall, Nippon Seinenkan Hall) in 2007.

Todoroki was a special supporter of the 2019 World Women's Handball Championship and sang Japan's national anthem at the opening ceremony.

Her nicknames are "Tom" and "Ishi-san".

== Notable performances and roles ==
=== Moon new actor era ===
- Me and My Girl (1987-88) - Gerald Bolingbroke

=== Snow new actor era ===
- Rose of Versailles (1989) - Andre
- The Great Gatsby (1991-92) - Biloxi, Jay Gatsby (shinjinkoen performance)
- Myth of Lovers (1992) - (First leading performance at Takarazuka Bow Hall)

=== Snow era ===
- Gone with the Wind (1994) - Rhett Butler (Takarazuka Cast); Rhett Butler and Ashley Wilkes (Tokyo Cast)
- Akanesasu Murasaki no Hana (1995, 1996) - Prince Naka no Ōe
- JFK (1995) - Dr. Martin Luther King Jr.
- Elisabeth (1996) - Luigi Lucheni
- Natasha of the Rainbow (1996, 1997) - Takeshi Kurisaki
- Kamen no Romanesque (1997) - Chevelier de Danceney

=== Snow top star era ===
- Ghost at Midnight (Top Star Debut, 1997) - Charles
- Shun'ou Fu (1997-1998) - Jana Ryuuzan
- THE FICTION (1998) - One-Man Show based on the life of Giacomo Casanova
- Gone with the Wind (1998) - Rhett Butler
- The Man Called Bacchus (1999, 2000) - Julian Grandgeorges
- Arch of Triumph (2000) - Ravic
- In Search of El Dorado (2001) - Yataro Iwasaki
- Flaming Love - Fuchai, King of Wu (final performance as the top star of Snow Troupe, 2001-02)

=== Senka era ===
==== With Flower Troupe ====
- Gone with the Wind (Nissay Theater, 2002) - Rhett Butler
- A Flute Named Wind (2003) - Matsudaira Tadateru Kazusanosuke (first Takarazuka Grand Theater performance as a Senka member)
- The Odd Couple (2012) - Oscar Madison
- For The People (2016) - Abraham Lincoln

==== With Moon Troupe ====
- Rome at Dawn (Takarazuka Grand Theater, 2006) - Julius Caesar
- Oklahoma! (Nissay Theater, 2006) - Curly McLain
- Gone with the Wind (2014, 2015) - Rhett Butler
- Oedipus Rex (2015) - Oedipus
- Shigure Hill Road in Nagasaki (2017) - Isaji
- Che Guevara (2019) - Ernesto "Che" Guevara

==== With Snow Troupe ====
- Gone with the Wind (Nissay Theater, 2002) - Rhett Butler
- Hanakuyou - Commemoration of the Buddha's Birthday (Nissay Theater, 2004) - Emperor Go-Mizunoo
- Evgeni Onegin (2010) - Evgeni Onegin
- Arch of Triumph (Takarazuka Grand Theater, 2018) - Ravic

==== With Star Troupe ====
- Shigure Hill Road in Nagasaki (Takarazuka Grand Theater, 2005) - Isaji
- Kean (Nissay Theater, 2007) - Edmund Kean
- The Odd Couple (2011) - Oscar Madison
- Chapter Two (2013-14) - George Schneider
- South Pacific (2013) - Emile de Becque
- The Lost Glory (Grand Theater, 2014) - Otto Goldstein
- Doctor Zhivago (2018) - Yuri Zhivago
- Cyrano de Bergerac (2020) - Cyrano de Bergerac

==== With Cosmos Troupe ====
- A Morning Breeze: The Challenge of Jiro Shirasu, the Samurai Gentleman (Takarazuka Grand Theater, 2008) - Jiro Shirasu
- The Eagle with Two Heads (2016) - Stanislas

=== Dinner Shows and Concerts ===
- L'hortensia de Juin (Dinner Show, 1997)
- Les Jours d'Amour (Dinner Show, 1999)
- Stylish! (Concert, 2002)
- Alpha - 20ans FACE OF YU (20th Anniversary Dinner Show, 2005)
- Lavender Monologue (Concert, 2007)
- Eternal Way With Yu (30th Anniversary Dinner Show, 2015)
- Yu 35, A New World (35th Anniversary Dinner Show, 2019)

(Since 1997 Todoroki Yu has the tradition to hold a dinner show every year.)

== Awards ==
- 2000 - 55th ACA National Arts Festival, award of excellence (theater): Ravic (Arch of Triumph)
- 2002 - 28th Kikuta Kazuo Theater Awards: Rhett Butler (Gone with the Wind)
- 2002 - 12th Japanese Movie Critics Awards, (musical): Rhett Butler (Gone with the Wind)
- 2017 - 24th Yomiuri Theater Awards, award of excellence (actress): Abraham Lincoln (For the People)

Preceded by Fubuki Takane	Top Star (Otokoyaku) for Snow Troupe; 1997-2002	Succeeded by Yu Emao
