= Onnagata =

Male actors who impersonate women in Japanese kabuki theatre

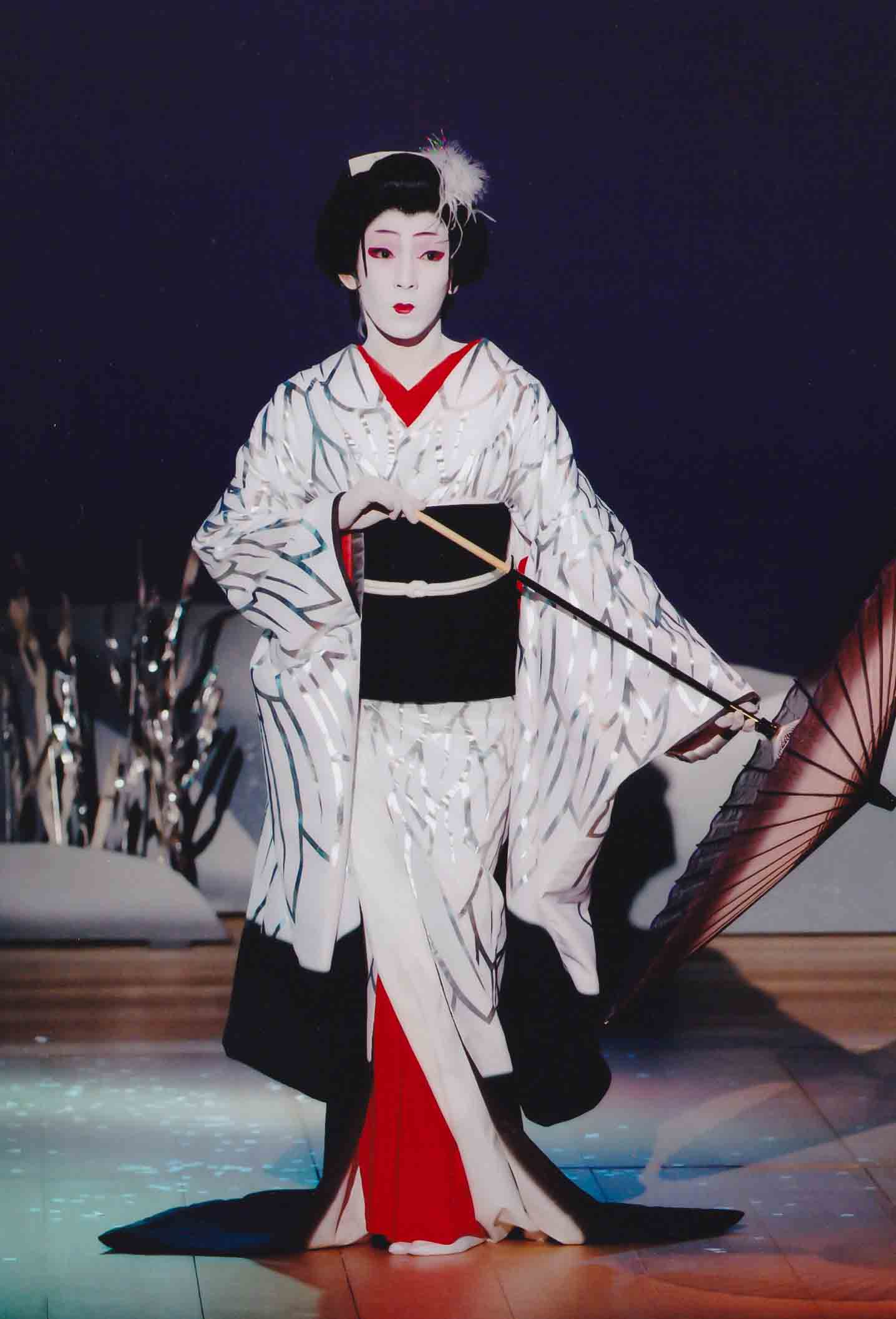
Sagimusume (Heron Maiden) dance performed by onnagata Akifusa Guraku in 2011

Onnagata (女形/女方, lit. 'female role'), also oyama (女形, lit. 'female form'), are male actors who play female roles in kabuki theatre. The practice originated in 1629 after women were banned from performing in kabuki performances. There are many specific techniques that actors must learn to master the role of onnagata.

== History ==
=== Edo Period ===
In the early 17th century, shortly after the emergence of the genre, many kabuki theaters had an all-female cast (onna kabuki, or kabukimono), with women playing men's roles as necessary. Wakashū kabuki ('adolescent-boy kabuki'), with a cast composed entirely of young men playing both male and female roles, and frequently dealing in erotic themes, originated circa 1612.

The role of the onnagata was shaped during the Edo period as an expression of femininity that was meant to align with the femininity of real women in Edo society. Both onnagata and wakashū (or wakashū-gata), actors specializing in adolescent female roles (and usually adolescents themselves), were the subject of much appreciation by both male and female patrons, and were often prostitutes. All-male casts became the norm after 1629, when women were banned from appearing in kabuki due to the prevalent prostitution of actresses and violent quarrels among patrons for the actresses' favors. This ban failed to stop the problems, since the young male (wakashū) actors were also fervently pursued by patrons. This more modern, all-male kabuki was originally known as yarō kabuki ('male kabuki') to distinguish it from earlier theatrical forms.

In 1642, onnagata roles were forbidden, resulting in plays that featured only male characters. These plays continued to have erotic content and generally featured many wakashū roles, often dealing in themes of nanshoku (male homosexuality); officials responded by banning wakashū roles as well. The ban on onnagata was lifted in 1644, and on wakashū in 1652, on the condition that all actors, regardless of role, adopted the adult male hairstyle with shaved pate. Onnagata and wakashū actors soon began wearing a small purple headscarf (murasaki bōshi) to cover the shaved portion, which became iconic signifiers of their roles and eventually became invested with erotic significance as a result. After authorities rescinded a ban on wig-wearing by onnagata and wakashū actors, the murasaki bōshi was replaced by a wig and now survives in a few older plays and as a ceremonial accessory.

=== Meiji era and beyond ===
During the Meiji era, the ban on women performing was lifted, and women began performing in kabuki performances where they played onnagata roles. This was more uncommon as it was standard for onnagata to be an artistically feminine performance played by a male actor who underwent training to learn the role. In contemporary kabuki performance, onnagata is a separate theatrical role with different training that is separate from actual women in society.

After film was introduced in Japan at the end of the 19th century, the oyama continued to portray females in movies until the early 1920s. At that time, however, using real female actresses was coming into fashion with the introduction of realist shingeki films. The oyama staged a protest at Nikkatsu in 1922 in backlash against the lack of work because of this.

== Onnagata performance techniques ==
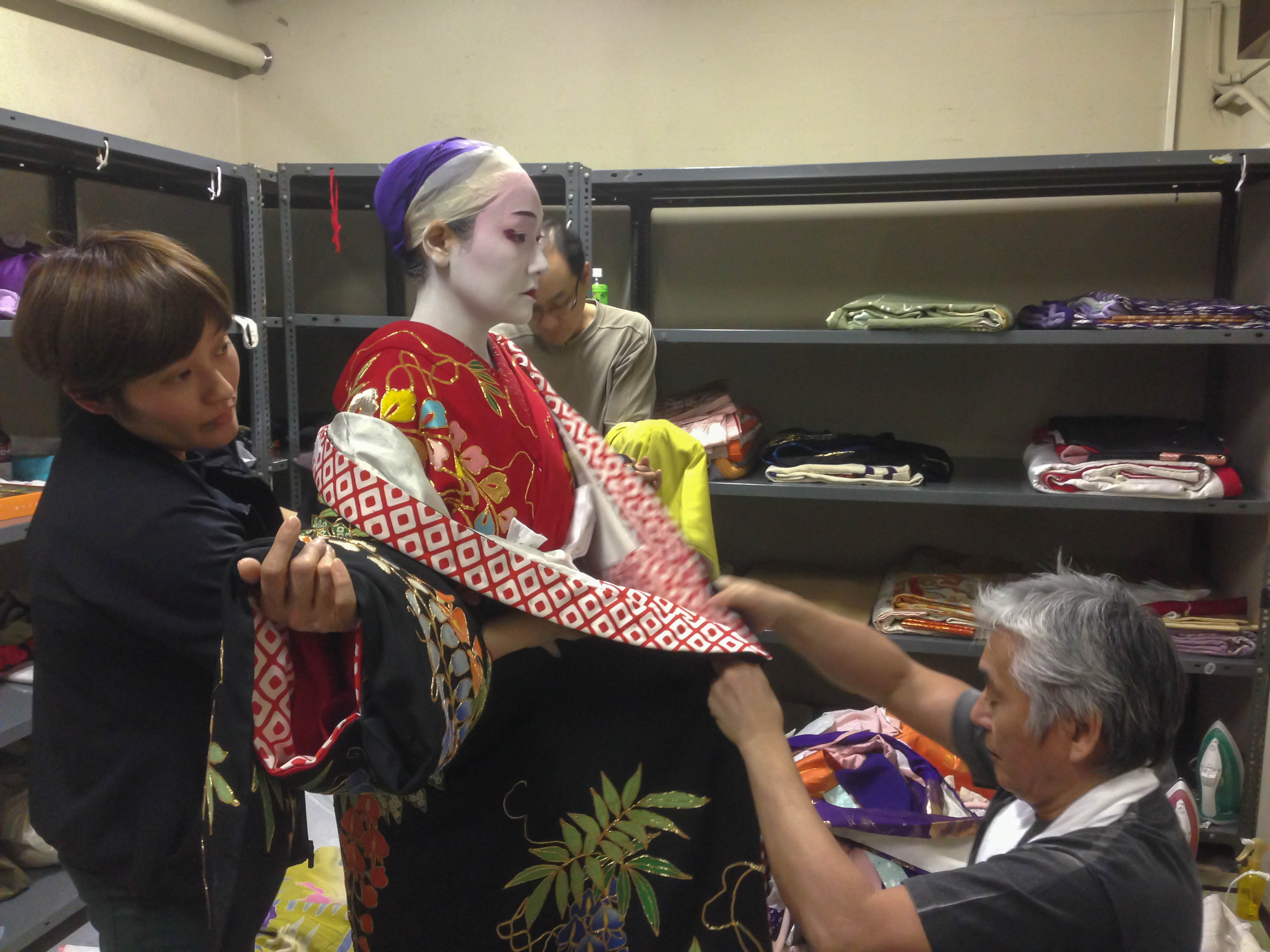
Onnagata performer being dressed before a performance

Every kabuki actor is expected to have facility with onnagata techniques. These include learning onnagata makeup, which is vastly different from that of a male character's, and adopting traditional feminine mannerisms specific to the role of the onnagata. Some of the techniques that onnagata actors have to master with years of training and research include being able to move gracefully across the stage when wearing geta, adopting a more feminine posture and physical mannerisms like slouched shoulders and bending knees, and speaking at a higher pitch (falsetto) throughout the entire performance. The falsetto used by the onnagata performers is not meant to be an exact imitation of the female voice. Instead, onnagata imitate typical vocal intonations associated with femininity. The type of falsetto varies depending on the specific role that the onnagata is performing. Many actors specialise in onnagata roles, such as Bandō Tamasaburō V.

"Two Actors Combing Hair"; handpainted ukiyo-e scroll attributed to Hishikawa Morofusa, circa 1700. An onnagata wearing a purple headscarf combs the hair of a wakashū-gata (identifiable by his forelocks and partially shaved head).

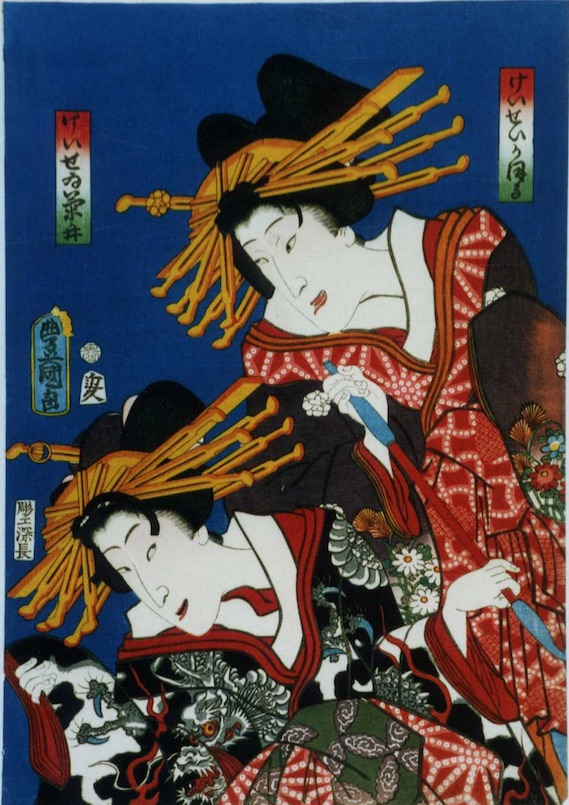
Nakamura Shikan IV and Sawamura Tanosuke III in courtesan roles. Print by Toyokuni in 1860, the year of Sawamura's debut under that name on the kabuki stage.

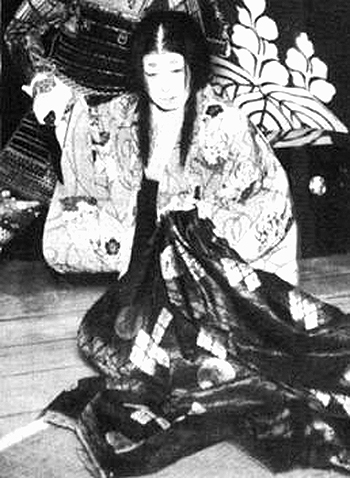
Nakamura Utaemon V (1866–1940) as Yodo-gimi in the kabuki play Hototogisu Kojō no Rakugetsu

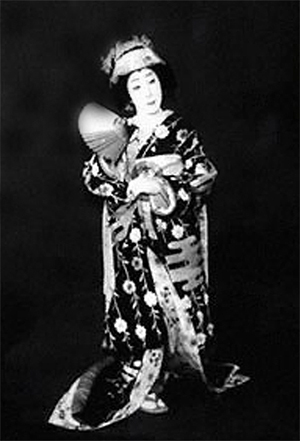
Nakamura Utaemon VI in costume for a female kabuki role in Musume Dōjōji, 1951.

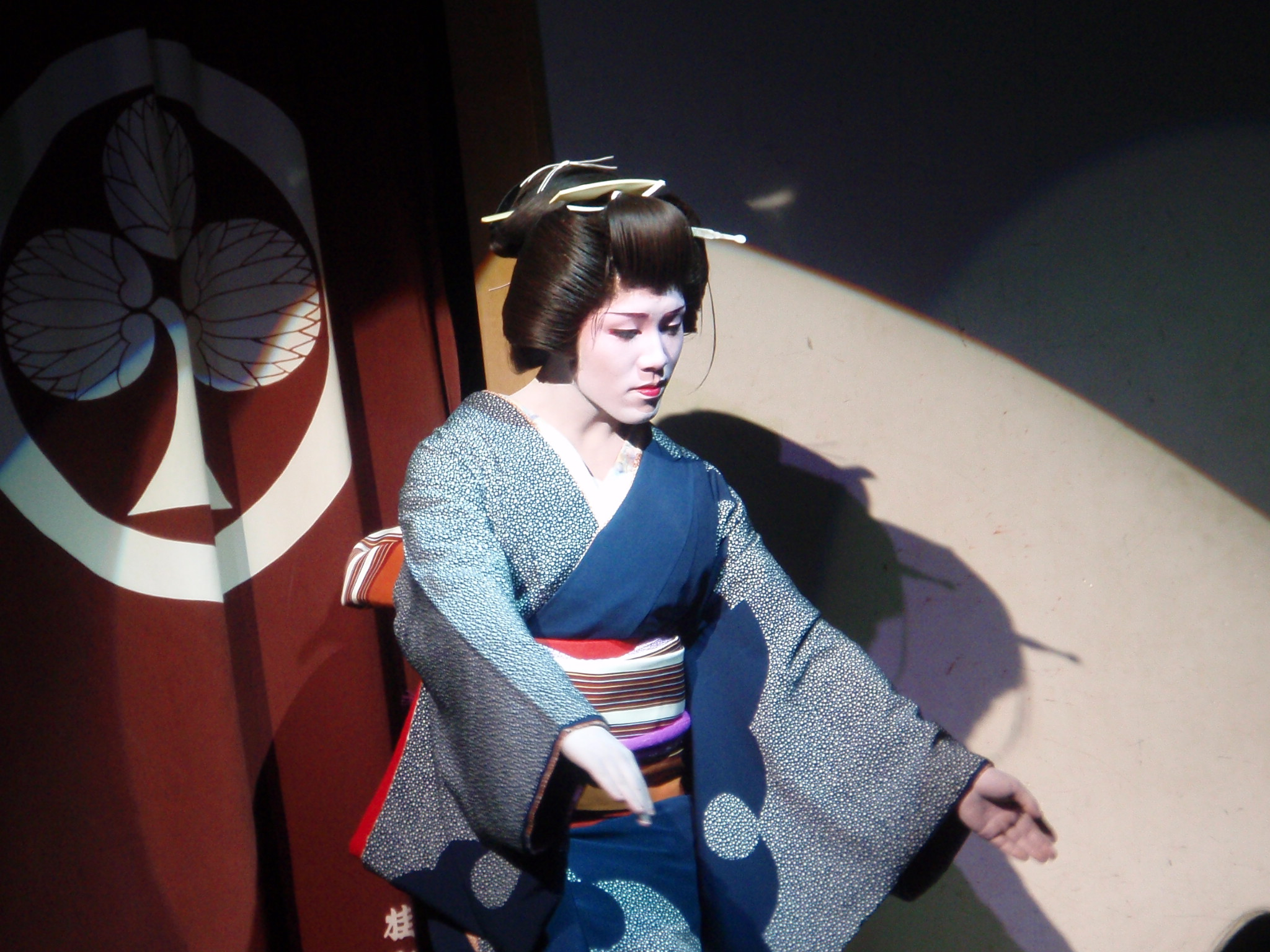
Popular onnagata Daigoro Tachibana dancing in a performance at the Miyoshibashi Theatre in Yokohama, November 2007. His crest can be seen on the red curtain behind him.

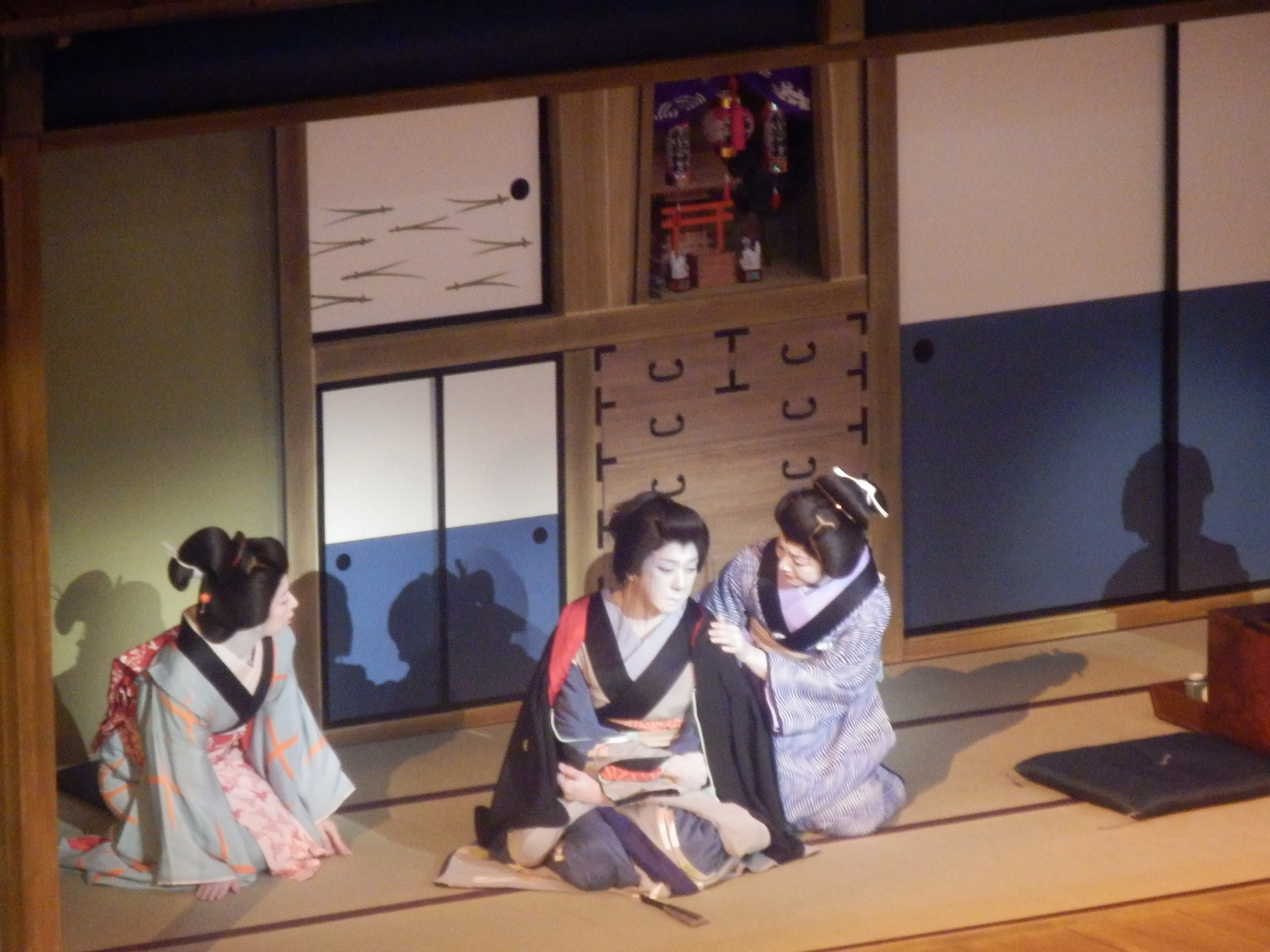
Bandō Tamasaburō V (center) in kabuki play Nihonbashi (December 2012)

== In popular culture ==
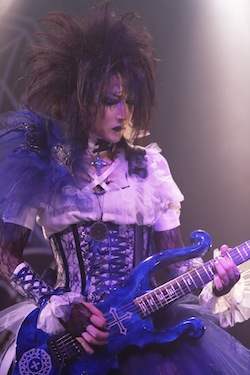
Mana, a self-identified onnagata musician

The influence of onnagata on Japanese culture has played an important part in the visual kei genre. The subculture emphasizes gender-nonconforming expression, and self-identified male performers who adopt female clothing within the genre are sometimes referred to as onnagata. Music journalist Showgun Fuyu cited X Japan drummer and co-founder Yoshiki as the pioneer of onnagata in visual kei. Music website Barks credited the increase in onnagata band members to Malice Mizer, due to the influence of their guitarist and co-founder Mana. Mana himself has said that he wanted to be the ultimate onnagata.

In the United States, one of the more well-known onnagata is Gia Gunn (real name Gia Ichikawa), a Japanese-American drag queen who began performing as an onnagata when she was five years old. She mentioned this experience during her tenure on the sixth season of RuPaul's Drag Race, crediting it as one of the inspirations for her drag. After the sixth season of Drag Race, she came out as a trans woman, crediting her first exposure to gender nonconformity back to her performances as a child: "I guess at the time, I didn't even realize that years later this would have resonated with me on a much more personal and deeper level". Later, during her return to Drag Race for the fourth season of All Stars, her entry to the first episode's talent competition was a short kabuki performance in drag that incorporated a blend of traditional and modern elements.

The 2025 Japanese film Kokuho, directed by Lee Sang-Il, is an adaptation of the 2018 novel of the same name. It is about the decades-long rivalry between two onnagata actors each striving to become a kokuho (lit. 'National Treasure'). The first major kabuki film to be released in more than 80 years, it became the all-time highest-grossing Japanese live-action film.

== Notable onnagata ==
- Bandō Tamasaburō V
- Daigoro Tachibana
- Kataoka Nizaemon XII
- Nakamura Jakuemon IV
- Nakamura Shichinosuke II
- Nakamura Utaemon VI
- Onoe Kikugorō V
- Sawamura Tanosuke III (1845–1878; 三代目 沢村田之助; only occasionally Sawamura written as 澤村).
- Sakata Tōjūrō IV
- Taichi Saotome
- Yoshizawa Ayame I

== See also ==
- Japanese theatre
- Otokonoko
- Kagema for male prostitutes generally
- Cross-gender acting
- Drag show
- Köçek
- Pantomime dame
- Travesti (theatre)
- Womanless wedding
