= Fubuki Takane =

Japanese actress (born 1965)

- Born: 4 December 1965 (age 59); Kyoto, Japan
- Occupation: actress
- Years active: 1983-Now

Yuki Asada (born 4 December 1965), better known by her stage name Fubuki Takane (高嶺 ふぶき, Takane Fubuki), is a Japanese actress and a former member of the Takarazuka Revue, where she specialized in playing male characters (Otokoyaku). She joined the revue in 1983 and resigned in 1997.

== General information ==
Takane was born in Kyoto, Japan. Having spent her entire Takarazuka career in Snow Troupe, she was the second regular star partner of legend Mari Hanafusa and is most remembered for two roles: Franz Joseph (the first of Takarazuka to be in this role) and Viscount Valmont of Kamen no Romanesque (The Takarazuka's adaptation of Dangerous Liaisons).

After she resigned from the company, she played Victoria Grant in Victor/Victoria in 1997. Her career is mostly focused on stage, but she also makes occasional TV appearances.

== Notable roles and performance ==
=== Takarazuka era ===
==== Regular cast era ====
- Valenteno - Natacha Rambova
- JFK - Robert F. Kennedy
- Elisabeth - Franz Joseph
- An Invitation from Alice - Jack/Ernest (Leading Performance at Bow Hall)

==== Top star era ====
- Natasha of the Rainbow - Kaoru Sanjo
- On a Clear Day You Can See Forever - Mark
- Kamen no Romanesque - Count Valmont

=== After Takarazuka ===
==== Stage ====
- Victor/Victoria - Victoria Grant
- I Do! I Do! - Agnes
- How to Succeed in Business Without Really Trying- Rosemary Pilkington
- Love Letters - Melissa Gardner

==== TV ====
- The Golden Wings - Kinuko Hozhina

Preceded by Maki Ichiro	Top Star (Otokoyaku) for Snow Troupe; 1996-1997	Succeeded by Yu Todoroki
