= Never Say Goodbye (musical) =

- Japanese production poster
- Music: Frank Wildhorn
- Lyrics: Shûichirô Koike
- Book: Shûichirô Koike
- Productions: 2006 Takarazuka, Japan; 2006 Tokyo, Japan

Never Say Goodbye is a musical with a book and lyrics by Shûichirô Koike and music by Frank Wildhorn. It was written specifically for Takarazuka Revue, the all-female Japanese theatre company. Wildhorn was the first non-Japanese to write an original musical for the company.

Set against the background of the Spanish Civil War, the plot centers on socialist playwright Katherine McGregor and renowned photographer Georges Malraux, a Polish Jew who fled his homeland for Paris. The two first meet in Hollywood at a party announcing the film adaptation of Katherine's play Tempest in Spain, based on the opera Carmen. The two are reunited in Barcelona, where they unexpectedly find themselves falling in love as they become embroiled in a battle against fascism.

Directed by Koike, the production was staged in 2006 at the Takarazuka Grand Theater in Takarazuka, Hyōgo from March 24 through May 8, and at the Tokyo Takarazuka Theater in Tokyo, Japan from May 26 through July 2. The cast included Mari Hanafusa as Katherine and Yōka Wao as Georges. Never Say Goodbye marked the final performance of both stars before their retirement from the troupe.

A full-length cast recording, a folio of sheet music, and a video and DVD of the show have been released.

== Song list ==
Act I

- Coconut Grove
- The Girl I Look For
- Fake City
- Je Suis Un Déraciné (I Am One Uprooted)
- Never Say Goodbye
- Olimpiada Popular
- People's Art
- The Outbreak of The Civil War
- Without Bullfight
- That's What I Can't Do
- No Pasaran!
- Centuria Olimpiada
- One Card
- No Pasaran! (Reprise)
- The Woman of My Life
- Meant for Each Other
- We Are "Camarada"
- One Heart

Act II

- San Giordi Fiesta
- Purge of the PSUC
- Conflict of Love
- The Woman of My Life (Reprise)
- Centuria Olimpiada (Reprise)
- Je Suis Un Déraciné (Reprise)
- Propaganda
- Charity
- Tragedy in Barcelona
- Battlefield
- One Heart
- The Truth of Love
