= Sakiho Juri =

Japanese actress

- Born: 28 October 1971 (age 54); Minoh, Osaka, Japan
- Occupation: actress
- Years active: 1990—present
- Website: http://www.juri-pyon.net

Sakiho Juri (樹里 咲穂, Juri Sakiho; born 28 October 1971) is a Japanese performing artist and a former member of the Takarazuka Revue, where she specialized in playing male characters (Otokoyaku). She joined the revue in 1990 and resigned in 2005. She is from Osaka.

== Troupe history ==
- Moon Troupe: 1990–1998
- Cosmo Troupe: 1998–2000
- Supreme Member: 2000–2005

== General information ==
Sakiho Juri started her Takarazuka career at Moon Troupe upon completion of her training. She played Jaqueline Carstone in the first act of Me and My Girl, Anita in the Moon's production of West Side Story, Ricardo in The Wind of Buenos Aires and a small-time crook called Duchain in Crossroad.

In 1998, she was being transferred to the newly found Cosmos Troupe in order to replace Hikaru Asami, who had been transferred to Snow Troupe, and her first role in Cosmo Troupe is Prince Rudolph in the Tokyo run of Cosmo's production of Elisabeth in 1998. With the future portray of Emperor Franz Joseph of Flower's production of Elisabeth in 2003, she became one of the three actresses that has portrayed both father and son in this musical (along with Yōka Wao, who is the Emperor in the 1998 production and Mao Ayabuki, who is the Prince in the 2003 production) among actresses from the company.

In June 2000, the directors of the company had made a radical change on the troupe structure by sending the second and third tier actresses of each troupe to the Senka, which served as the waiting list for top star of the troupes. Under this circumstance, she became one of the "Senka's Eleven" along with Wataru Kozuki. Therefore, when she had her first Bow Hall leading show, Freedom: Mr. Carmen (the retelling of the famous opera Carmen with Carmen is male and Jose [reversed with Josie] is female), which is under the production of Cosmo Troupe, she is billed as a member of Senka rather than as a member of Cosmo Troupe.

She made special appearance in the production of Flower, Snow, Star and Cosmo. Also, she hosted TV show for Takarazuka Sky Stage, the speciality channel of TCA. In 2005, she resigned from the Revue via Flower Troupe by having her top bill performance Ernest in Love, reunioned with Asuka Tono. This makes her the only one among the Eleven (that did not make to the top) to have her own top bill show while resigning from the company.

After the resignation from the company, she continues her career on stage. Currently, she is married and hosts JURI no dondake GOGO5!? for Takarauzuka Sky Stage as a part of the celebration of fifth anniversary of the channel.

She got married on March 3, 2007.

She is one of the cast in the first production of the Japanese stage version of The Wedding Singer

== Notable Performance and Roles ==
=== Takarazuka Era ===
==== Moon New Actor Era ====
- Me and My Girl – Jaqueline Carstone (Act 1)
- Can-Can – Boris
- Descendant of Baron – Richard

==== Moon Era ====
- West Side Story – Anita
- The Wind of Buenos Aires – Ricardo (Starring Jun Shibuki)
- Dark Brown Eyes – Sergeant Maximich

==== Cosmos Era ====
- Elisabeth – Rudolph (Replacing Hikaru Asami for Tokyo performance)
- Crossroad – Duchain
- Passion: Jose and Carmen – Remendad
- Black Rose of the Desert – Shayza

==== Senka Era ====
===== With Flower Troupe =====
- Michelangelo – Mendolini
- Elisabeth – Franz Joseph
- Marrakech: A Crimson Tombstone – Leon (Last performance at the Grand Theater)
- Ernest in Love – Jack Worthing (Last performance with Takarazuka)

===== With Snow Troupe =====
- Romance de Paris – Rachid Salam

===== With Star Troupe =====
- Rose of Versailles – Andre (Sharing with Tatsuki Kouju and Wataru Kozuki in the Takarazuka run)

===== With Cosmos Troupe =====
- Freedom: Mr. Carmen – Carmen (Bow Hall lead performance)
- Nostalgia Across the Sea – Genkuro Tokaiya
- Castel Mirage – Richard Taylor (Replacing Wataru Kozuki in the Tokyo performance)
- Phantom – Gerard Carriere

==== Personal Concert ====
- JUBILEE-S

==== Performance outside Takarazuka ====
- Cinderella, Prince (with Asuka Tono and former members of TCA)
- SHOCK

=== Performance after Takarazuka ===
- Elisabeth 10th Anniversary Gala Concert – Luigi Lucheni (2005)
- Sweet Charity as Nicky (2005)
- Thoroughly Modern Millie as Miss Dorothy Brown (2005)
- The Wedding Singer as Holly (2008–2011)
- Nine as Our Lady of the Spa (2009)
- Side Show as Daisy Hilton (2010–2011)
- Berlin to Broadway with Kurt Weill
- Christmas Fantasy (Christmans DS)
- Gelvestar Gala Concert
- Juri Sakiho LIVE SHOW I gotta JURI'SM!
- TANGO SUMMER FASHION
- Secret Bridesmaid's Business
- SUPER COLLABORATE SHOW "Mr. PINSTRIPE"
- MUSICAL GALA CONCERT Vol.2
- In the Heights as Camila Rosario (2014)
- Elisabeth 20th Anniversary Gala Concert – Franz, Luigi Lucheni, Rudolph (2015–2016)
- The Addams Family as Alice Beineke (2017)
- Legally Blonde as Paulette Bonafonté (2017–2019)
- Les Misérables as Madame Thénardier (2021, 2024 – present)
- Jane Eyre as Miss Scatcherd/Bessie (2023)
- Violet as Old Lady/Hotel Hooker (2024)
- Mary Poppins as Bird Woman and Miss Andrew (2026)
