= Tsubasa Makoto =

Japanese singer and actress (born 1964)

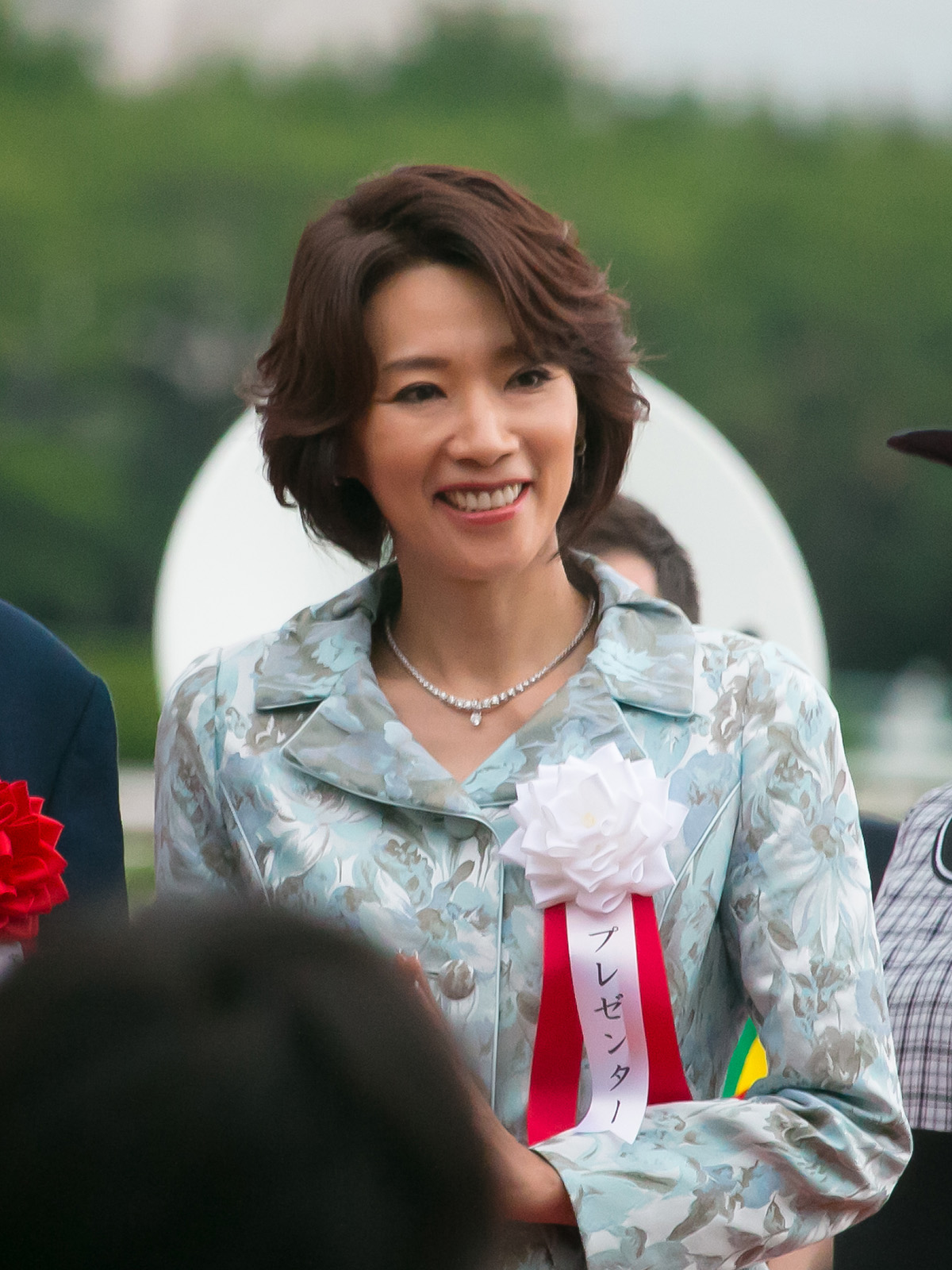
Tsubasa at the 58th Takarazuka Kinen Award Ceremony, June 25, 2017

Makoto Tsubasa (真琴 つばさ, Tsubasa Makoto; born November 25, 1964) is a Japanese singer and actress. She is a former top star of the Takarazuka Revue's Moon Troupe. Her nickname was Mami (マミ), derived from her first name.

Tsubasa is affiliated with F-Spirit, a subsidiary of Manase Productions.

== Education ==
In 1983, Makoto Tsubasa enrolled in the Takarazuka Music School as a member of the 71st class. She transferred to Jissen Women's University and attended the entrance ceremony, but when the Takarazuka admissions results were announced the next day, she dropped out after a day and enrolled. Tsubasa blogged that Asami Rei and Mao Daichi, an otokoyaku of the Takarazuka Revue's Moon Troupe in the 1950s, were influences at the school.

== Career ==
In 1985, Tsubasa joined the Takarazuka Revue, making her stage debut in the Flower Troupe's production of If Love Is, Life Is Forever. At the time, the Flower Troupe was packed with promising star candidates, including Tsubasa's close friend and classmate Aika Mire, Kasu Tatsuki, and Shibuki Jun, who were a year younger than her, and Takumi Hibiki and Asato Suzuki, who were two years younger. Tsubasa, however, later described it as a "dark age." In 1991, she was selected for her first leading role in the final newcomer performance of The Emblem of Venice, thanks to the good offices of Mizuki Ooura, who left the company after this performance.

After making her Takarazuka debut as the lead in Le Grand Meaulnes at the Takarazuka Bow Hall in 1993, Tsubasa was transferred to the Moon Troupe. There she established herself as a male star, an otoyaku. Of this time Tsubasa has said:

When I was able to move to Tsukigumi, part of me was glad because I thought I’d have a clean slate. I was optimistic about the thought of ascending from my life on the edge that I’d been living up until that point, but the edge of the cliff remained the edge of the cliff (haha). At first, getting used to a new troupe is really hard. You don’t fit in with that troupe, but you can’t go back to your old one, so it’s complicated.

For over a year, she also continued to play female roles (musumeyaku), including Scarlett O'Hara in Gone with the Wind and Jaquie in Me and My Girl.

In 1997, following the retirement of Kuze Seika, Tsubasa was appointed top star of the Moon Troupe in El Dorado. This was the first time in 24 years since Otakiko took the top star position in 1973 that someone from another troupe had become a top star.

When Fuka left the company in 1999, Tsubasa welcomed Rei Dan as her new partner. Tsubasa performed in China and improvised in Luna - Message of the Moon, and appeared on many TV shows such as THE Yoru mo Hippare. In 2001, she left the company after the Grand Theater performance of Sonata of Love/ESP! (due to scheduling conflicts, the Tokyo performance came first and the Grand Theater performance came later).

While with the troupe, Tsubasa performed in the opening performances of two theaters: the Takarazuka 1000days and the Tokyo Takarazuka Theaters.

She continues to appear on Japanese television programs, mainly variety shows, as a singer and actress.
