= Maki Ichiro =

Japanese actress

- Born: Izumi Ishikawa (石川いづみ） January 9, 1965 (age 60); Nagoya, Aichi, Japan
- Other names: Maki Ichiro (一路真輝）
- Occupation(s): Actress, Singer
- Years active: 1982-present
- Known for: Her Otokoyaku roles as a member of Takarazuka Revue
- Spouse: Seiyō Uchino (m. 2006; div. 2011)

Maki Ichiro (Japanese: 路真輝; born January 9, 1965) is a Japanese actress. She is a former member of the Takarazuka Revue, in which she specialized in playing male roles (Otokoyaku). She joined the revue in 1982 and retired in 1996, following a four-year run as Snow troupe top-star.

== Awards ==
In 2016, received an excellence award at the 37th Matsuo Entertainment Awards.
