= The Window of Orpheus =

Japanese manga series

- Cover of the volume 1 of the Aizō version 1988 (4 volumes) featuring Julius von Ahrensmeyer

オルフェウスの窓 (Orufeusu no Mado)
- Genre: Historical, Drama, Mystery, Gender Bender, Romance, Tragedy
- Manga
- Written by: Riyoko Ikeda
- Published by: Shueisha
- Magazine: Weekly Margaret, Monthly Seventeen
- Original run: January 1975 – August 1981
- Volumes: 18

The Window of Orpheus (オルフェウスの窓, Orufeusu no Mado), also known as Orpheus no Mado or Das Fenster von Orpheus, is a Japanese shōjo manga and historical romance series written and illustrated by Riyoko Ikeda. The Manga was partially adapted into Takarazuka Revue musical entitled The Window of Orpheus - Story of Isaak, however this does not include the story in its entirety. The manga series was published by Shueisha, first in weekly Margaret from 1975 to 1976, then in monthly Seventeen from 1977 to 1981.

The series was collected in 18 bound volumes. It takes place in Germany, Austria and Russia with the backdrop stories of the World War I and the Russian Revolution.

== Theme ==
Riyoko Ikeda published her first long story The Rose of Versailles in 1973. The story had two main themes. One is the life of Marie Antoinette, the Queen of France. And the other is the love and the life of Oscar François de Jarjayes. These two themes were in resonance, and The Rose of Versailles got great popularity and success.

On the other hand, The Window of Orpheus has the three themes. The one is the life and the love of another Oscar François, that is, Julius von Ahrensmeyer. The second is the story of music and the life of a musician (Isaak) which Ikeda truly wished to describe. And the third is the historical romance in the Russian Revolution. Ikeda wrote the French Revolution in the Rose of Versailles, but she did not satisfy it. She wanted to describe the deeper human drama in the background of another revolution.

== Origin and development ==
Riyoko Ikeda learned piano from a young age. She loved music and wished to become a professional musician, but became aware that she lacked the talent for it. She gave up, but her passion for music has vividly remained throughout her life. This would then be a persistent theme, represented through the life of Isaak the musician.

In October 1973, after she completed The Rose of Versailles, serialized in Margaret, she travelled to Europe with her friends, the manga artists Toshie Kihara and Yōko Tadatsu (JA) for around a month and a half. They happened to stay in Regensburg by chance. There, Ikeda was inspired to create the stories of the music and romance which she could not fully express in The Rose of Versailles.

There were two obstacles in writing the first long story La Rose de Verailles. One was the editors of Margaret who asked and forced her to make Oscar a strong, high pride female protagonist. The true protagonist, the true "Rose" was Marie Antoinette though. And the other was that the readers of Margaret were early teens girls. What Ikeda wished to depict was the adult human love and life, but the media Margaret did not allow it.

Julius is apparently a feminine and sensitive aspect of Oscar François. Ikeda did not want to weaken the themes of her manga arts. She calmly judged that Margaret was not proper media where she expressed and realized her true themes. She changed the media from Margaret to Seventeen. Ikeda firmly decided she would never compromise in her creation of the work. Her decision gave birth the story The Window of Orpheus.

== Story ==
The story consists of four Parts. It encompassed over 30 years, from 1893 to 1924. Through this four parts story, there are three major characters: Julius von Ahrensmeyer, a daughter of the aristocratic house Ahrensmeyer of the Kingdom of Bayern, Alexei Mikhailov (alias Klaus Sommerschmitt), a son of the Marquis House of the Russian Empire, and Isaak Gotthelf Weisheit, a prodigious pianist born in the common people.

=== Prologue ===
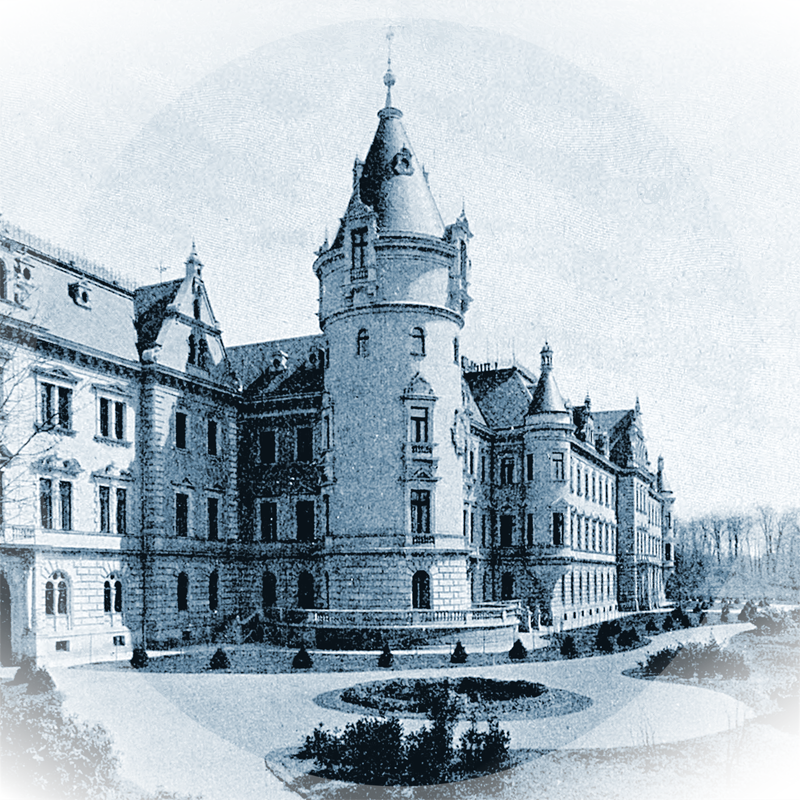
The model of the tower of the Window of Orpeus. The tower in the Castle of the Thurn and Taxis in Regensburg. The tower does not have window

In the Autumn of 1903, a boy comes to the Saint Sebastian music school as a transfer student in Regensburg, Bayern, Germany. His name is Isaak. Hearing of a certain legend, he goes up the tower and stands in front of the old window with curiosity. He looks down through the window, and sees a person walking by. It looks like a girl at a glance, but that person is another transfer student, called Julius.

The next day, Julius hears of the legend from Isaak. Saint Sebastian is an all boys school, but Julius is a cross-dressed girl, not a boy. Thinking over the legend, Julius looks up the window. There is a person, and he sees Julius through the window. It is Klaus, an upper grade student. Here, three people, Isaak, Julius and Klaus (Alexei) are combined through the legend. The window is called the Window of Orpheus.

==== The Legend ====
There is a legend dating back about 400 years ago in the Catholic Saint Sebastian school. It says if a man stands in front of the Window of Orpheus, and if he first sees a figure of a female through this window, he will fall in love with that female. But it will bring pain, for the love will end up like the tragic Greek myth of Orpheus and Eurydice.

Julius, Isaak, and Klaus are tied to the legend of the window. And there are other people who are tied to this legend as well. In the shadow of the legend of the window, the four parts long story opens.

=== Part 1 - The Secret of the House Ahrensmeyer ===
The stage of Part 1 is Regensburg in the Kingdom of Bayern, Germany, 1903 to 1905.

Julius is a girl. Her mother Renate was a concubine of Julius' aristocratic father Ahrensmeyer. Renate was abandoned by him when she had Julius. For revenge against the Ahrensmeyers, Renate gave her daughter a male name Julius and raised her as a boy.

After the death of Ahrensmeiyer's wife, Julius and her mother are accepted into the Ahrensmeyer house, and since there are no other male children, Julius becomes heir of the Ahrensmeyers. Julius learns piano from her earliest days, so she enters the Saint Sebastian school as a boy when she is 15.

Julius spends her school life with friends Isaak, Klaus and other students. But the legend of the Window casts a shadow on her mind since she is a girl, and she starts feeling a kind of love toward Klaus, a manlike, yet mysterious student.

There are conflicts between the rich and the poor, the noble and the common. The Ahrensmeyer is the old aristocratic house. The newly rising merchant house Kippenberg is a rich family, while the Ahrensmeyer's is declining. Moreover, strange and terrible events take place to the Ahrensmeyers in succession. There seems to be some secret with the Ahrensmeyers, something that may have ties to the German Empire and Russian Empire.

=== Part 2 - The Road of Isaak as a Pianist ===
More of the secrets of the Ahrensmeyers are unraveled, but in the course of the search, Klaus, real name Alexei Mikhailov, suddenly disappears, having returned to his homeland, Russia. Julius, now having fallen in love with Klaus, follows him to Russia. Isaak remains alone in Regensburg, but is later invited to the Vienna Music Academy, and becomes a student there. Thus Part 2 begins.

The stage of Part 2 is Vienna, the capital of Austria, 1907 to 1920. The protagonist is Isaak Weisheit.

In Vienna, Isaak meets various people. In the blessed environment, Isaak's talent begins to bloom. He befriends a mysterious student named Reinhard, and one day hears the strange music Reinhard plays. The piece turns out to have been composed by Reinhard, who is a musical prodigy. However, it seems to be impossible to play this music on piano, with Reinhard even damaging his fingers in the attempt, but Isaak is determined to try.

Isaak debuts as an outstanding new pianist, and Reinhard gives him advice and a warning: "You should know what is true art". Learning from Reinhard and Wilhelm Backhaus, Isaak opens up a new frontier of musical art. He later performs with a Russian violinist named Anastasia, who turns out to be a member of a Russian revolutionary group. She gives Isaak a message from Alexei (Klaus) before they go their separate ways.

Isaak later marries Roberta, an acquaintance of his from Regensburg, and is later called off to war.

He returns from World War I, but his fingers have been damaged, and he cannot play piano anymore. He later returns to Regensburg with his son Jubel, and when walking along an old, familiar street, Isaak meets a beautiful woman.

=== Part 3 - The Russian Revolution, Fate of Alexei ===
Part 3 is mainly set in Sankt Peterburg and Moskva in Russia, 1893 to 1917.

The story begins about 10 years before the three main characters, Isaak, Julius and Klaus (Alexei) meet in Regensburg, Germany in 1903. In the Spring of 1893, Alexei is accepted into the Marquis house Mikhailov after his mother's death. He meets his elder brother Dmitri, who is secretly a revolutionary, but also famous as a genius violinist. Alexei learns the spirit of brave men and a passion for music from Dmitri. But Marquis Dmitri Mikhailov is shot to death in an act of betrayal.

Alexei and Alraune, the fiancée of Dmitri, flee from Russia, but after the several years of joyous school life, his homeland and comrades call Alexei back to Russia in 1905. At the Sankt Peterburg station, he sees Julius has followed him, but he runs from her. Julius is searching for Alexei when she gets caught up in the riots and is shot. When she wakes up, she is in the gorgeous mansion of Marquis Yusupov, where she is declared his prisoner.

Alexei and his revolutionary comrades are working for the new Russia. They establish the Soviet (the Committee), but the revolutionaries are divided into Mensheviks and Bolsheviks. Yusupov realises that Rasputin is the enemy of Russia and the Royal House, and does not trust him at all. Yusupov encounters Alexei, but he does not kill or arrest him since Alexei saved his younger brother's life. Alexei is captured by other authorities, however, and sent to a jail in Siberia, where he is to be sentenced to death. Marquis Yusupov sends a petition to the authorities, sparing Alexei's life.

Anastasia is arrested in Vienna and sent to Russia where she is sentenced to a Siberian prison. Bolshevik revolutionaries try to rescue her, but their plan is foiled by Antonina's information. In the confusion, Julius is reunited with Alexei, but she briefly does not remember him due to a bout of amnesia.

The Russian Empire is now a melting pot of conspiracies and power struggles. Marquis Yusupov decides to assassinate Rasputin of behalf of the Tsar Nikolai II. Meanwhile, Julius and Alexei have rekindled their romance, and Julius has conceived Alexei's child. Now, Alexei and Yusupov face the fates that will bring them to ultimate destinies.

In the cold water of the Neva River, Alexei remembers the Window of Orpheus. He is suddenly riddled with bullets, collapsing with his final thoughts being of Julius. Marquis Yusupov finds him, and respectfully closes his eyes. He raises a pistol and says to himself: "I've made two mistakes in my life, but I never regret". His sister Vera Yusupova departs Russia for Regensburg with Julius, in order to keep the promise she made to her brother.

Kerenski seizes power, but he soon escapes from the Winter Palace, and the Bolsheviks win. Thus Vladimir Lenin declares their victory of the Revolution in November 1917.

=== Part 4 - Regensburg, Farewell Julius ===
The main stage of Part 4 is again Regensburg, Weimar Republic.

In 1920, Julius walks to the Orpheus Window tower in Regensburg. There she sees an unknown man, later revealed to be Isaak. As he makes eye contact with Julius, Part 4 officially begins.

Maria Barbara has been trying to nurse Julius back to health, but Julius still cannot remember anything. Isaak, who now works in the downtown tavern, and David try to help Maria in her attempts. Julius wants to recover her memories, but various trials all fail. One morning they read a newspaper article which says a certain unidentified woman insists she is a royal princess of Russia, the youngest daughter, Anastasia. Ultimately, Julius goes to Berlin to meet a woman in an attempt to recover her memories.

==== Epilogue ====
In Berlin, while Julius never meets the woman, she understands that the secret of her house is somehow related to the large fortune which the Russian Tsar deposited in the German Imperial bank in secret. Julius now knows the truth, and that is good enough for her.

== Characters ==
The Latin spellings of the names of each character are based on the Encyclopedia 2005 (Orufeusu no Mado Daijiten), Character Section. (However, spellings of several names are not shown in this section).

=== Protagonists ===
Julius Leonhard von Ahrensmeyer (ユリウス・レオンハルト・フォン・アーレンスマイヤ)
Heir of the Ahrensmeyers. Though she is a woman, but her mother Renate raised her as a man. A student of the St. Sebastian music school. Shining, beautiful blonde hairs. Sensitive woman. She kills a quack doctor Jahn by paper knife. But it gives her mental damage and makes her amnesia. Julius falls in love with Klaus (Alexei). She knows someone try to kill the related people of the Ahrensmeyers. Who is and what reasons. There are secrets in the Ahrensmeyers. Julius hears the story from her sister Annelotte. Then, Julius leaves the Ahrensmeyer mansion and goes to Russia to follow Alexei.
Alexei Mikhailov (アレクセイ・ミハイロフ) alias Klaus Friedrich Sommerschmitt (クラウス・フリードリヒ・ゾンマーシュミット)
Born as a second son of the Marquis house of Russia. Her mother was but a concubine of the former Marquis. He liked and longed for his elder brother Dmitri. Marquis Dimitri was a true genius violinist and a revolutionary activist. But He was betrayed and executed. Alexei and Alraune, the fiancée of Dmitri, fled from Russia to Bayern, Germany, and he entered the music school under the pseudonym Klaus.There he meets with Julius. But he has the mission to do in Russia. It is his fate. Love to Julius or devotion to the future of his homeland Russia.
Isaak Gotthelf Weisheit (イザーク・ゴットヒルフ・ヴァイスハイト)
Son of a violinist of a low class tavern. Thanks to his talent, he can enter the Saint Sebastian music school. Isaak loves Julius. But Julius sees him as a friend. Isaak and his sister are fallen into poverty by the malicious pressure of Moritz. Isaak works in a tavern, where she meets Roberta. After the death of Friederike, he gets invitation to Vienna. He gets success as a pianist there, and experiences love with Amalie and Clara, and the marriage with Roberta. But everything is lost in the World of War. Isaak returns to Regensburg.

=== Main characters ===
Maria Barbara von Ahrensmeyer (マリア・バルバラ・フォン・アーレンスマイヤ)
Elder sister of Julius and Annelotte. Simple and sincere woman. After the death of their father, she is a de facto mistress of the Ahrensmeyers. Maria has been embracing the secret love for Mr. Wirklich, a music teacher, but he has a loved woman whom he met through the window of Orpheus long years ago, but unknown even her real name. Maria is about to be killed. But she survives and maintains the house.
Annelotte von Ahrensmeyer (アネロッテ・フォン・アーレンスマイヤ)
Elder sister of Julius. Egoistic and conspiracy woman. She has the secret and seems to know the secret of the Aharensmeyers. She talks Julius the secret of their house, but is poisoned by Julius for what she has done.
David Lassen (ダーヴィト・ラッセン)
Senior student of the music school and a good friend and adviser of Julius and Isaak. David opposes the marriage of Isaak. He says you will lose everything if you marry Roberta. Later David helps Maria to heal Julius's heavy amnesia. His model is real David Bowie.
Friederike Weisheit (フリデリーケ・ヴァイスハイト)
She is a younger sister of Isaak. She loves her brother Isaak. Because she is a step daughter of the parents of Isaak. Isaak knows this fact after her death.
Moritz Kaspar von Kippenberg (モーリッツ・カスパール・フォン・キッペンベルク)
Youngest son of the Kippenberg house. He loves Friederike, but she rejects him. Moritz deprives livelihood means of Isaak and Friederike by the money power of the house Kippenberg to make her follow him and love him. Later, he gets aware that what he did was the worst. Several years later, when Moritz and Maria Barbara visit at Vienna for business purpose, Moritz meets Malwida who very looks like late Friederike. He loves her, though he has a wife and child in Regensburg.
Katharina von Brenner (カタリーナ・フォン・ブレンネル)
Daughter of the aristocratic house Brenner. A piano disciple of Isaak. Mild and brave woman. Katharina adores and loves Isaak. She tries to help Isaak and Friederike. Though she is a high class woman, she becomes a professional nurse.
Reinhard von Emmerich (ラインハルト・フォン・エンマーリッヒ)
Genius pianist. He composed a strange music when he dressed as a girl, played piano, and was called an infant genius. Isaak learns what is the true art from Reinhard. But he is shot to death by his younger step brother Wolfgang, a little boy, though Wolfie has adored Reinhard, but since Reinhard was in adultery with Wolfie's mother. The spin-off Collage is the story of Wolfgang and their descendants.
Roberta Braun (ロベルタ・ブラウン)
She is a poor, low class girl who works in tavern. Roberta loves Isaak in secret. Roberta is raped by a man who buys her from her alcoholic father. Later Roberta works in Vienna as a prostitute. Isaak marries her. The marriage of learned musician and former prostitute woman results in class difference tragedy. Isaak loses everything. However, Roberta leaves his child behind.
Alraune von Egenolf (アルラウネ・フォン・エーゲノルフ)
A German woman. Alraune is a fiancée of Marquis Dmitri. After execution of Dmitri, she flees from Russia with Alexei, a younger brother of Dmitri. And she trains Alexei as a revolutionary. They return to Russia. But their revolutionary group is divided into two sects. Alexei joins in the Bolsheviks, but Alraune doesn't.
Anastasia Kulikovskaya (アナスタシア・クリコフスカヤ)
A Russian woman.
Prince Leonid Yusupov (レオニード・ユスーポフ侯爵)
Calm and clearheaded career officer. Commander of the Imperial Guard Regiment. Nicknamed "Blade of Ice". True loyal subject of the Romanov. But he is also a warmhearted, sincere man. He captures Julius, but secretly loves her. Yusupov tries to maintain the Empire. He plans the military coup d'état with General Kornilov. But they are defeated. Historical Prince Yusupov who assassinated Rasputin is one of his model.
Vera Yusupova (ヴェーラ・ユスーポフ)
Younger sister of Leonid.

=== Minor characters ===
==== Part 1 ====
Renate von Ahrensmeyer (レナーテ・フォン・アーレンスマイヤ)
Mother of Julius. She planned the revenge against the Ahrensmeyers. She raised Julius as a boy. She is about to be killed by fire. Is it an arson by anyone. In the far past, she told a lie that her name was "Kriemhild" to a man whom she met in the window of Orpheus.
Gertrud Plank (ゲルトルート・プランク)
Maid of the Ahrensmeyers. Gertrud was an abandoned child. She is a freckle girl. She loves and adores a cross-dressed Julius. But she happens to know Julius is a girl. Gertrud is killed by dogs set by someone.
Jakob Schneberdingen (ヤーコプ・シュネーバーディンゲン)
Servant and cabman of the Ahrensmeyers. Jakob adores Annelotte. He has been working for Annelotte as a devoted follower. He is a shadowy man, who has the last key of the secret.
Gerhard Jahn (ゲルハルト・ヤーン)
Unidentified man. He works as a fake doctor, and helps Renate. But his target is the large fortune of the Ahrensmeyers. He has relation with the secret. Jahn is killed by Julius by accident.
Hermann Wirklich (ヘルマン・ヴィルクリヒ)
Excellent teacher of the Music school. Isaak learns many things from him. But Julius gets aware that Wirklich is about to kill her several times. Why. Has he any relations with the Ahrensmeyers' secret. In fact, Hermann has wanted to take vengeance upon the Ahrensmeyers, wishing to kill all the related persons. He has the serious and terrible reason. He dies with Renate by falling from the window of Orpheus. People think they are in shameful relation of adultery and commit suicide together. But the truth is different.
Heinz Frensdorf (ハインツ・フレンスドルフ)
School Principal of the Saint Sebastian school. A kind, old man. He talks everything which he knows to Julius before he commits a suicide. By his confession, Julius knows he was a real father of Countess Behringer.
Bettina Hansemann (ベッティーナ・ハンゼマン)
Fiancée of Moritz. Married with him. Frau von Kippenberg.
State police officer (国家警察の男)
Name is unknown. He has been searching the secrets of the Ahrensmeyers. When Jahn is killed, he appears. 20 years later, when Jahn's relics is discovered, he again appears. He suggests various things. He knows the murder affair in which the family of Count Behringer was all killed. The Count was suspected as a Russian spy, and the father of Julius and the imperial soldiers went to arrest them. But there was resistance, and they killed Count Behringer and all the people in the house. But this is not true.

==== Part 2 ====
Amalie Schönberg (アマーリエ・シェーンベルク)
Daughter of Professor Schönberg, who is a teacher of Isaak in the Vienna Music Academy. Beautiful but ambitious woman. Isaak once tries to love her and is disappointed. Amalie learns from Katharina how to live strong as a woman.
Ingrid von Seidelhofer (イングリット・フォン・ザイデルホーファー)
Eldest sister of Malwida and Clara. She has kept unmarried because she loves low class servant Anton. Anton says he hopes her marriage from his status as a servant. Anton but cannot forget her and he kidnaps a little son of Ingrid. The Gaiden is the story of Anton and this kidnapped boy Kith.
Malwida von Seidelhofer (マルヴィーダ・フォン・ザイデルホーファー)
Elder sister of Clara. Piano disciple of Isaak. She met a man in the Window of Orpheus. She falls love in. But this love brings her pain.
Clara von Seidelhofer (クララ・フォン・ザイデルホーファー)
Youngest sister among three daughters of the house. Very clever girl and good piano disciple of Isaak. She has trouble in foot. She has talent of music. She respects Isaak and has love to him. Isaak thinks she is possibly a music successor of him.
Wilhelm Backhaus (ヴィルヘルム・バックハウス)
Famous pianist. He gives Isaak very kind advice several times. He also raises the son of Isaak as a musician. The model is a real pianist Wilhelm Backhaus.

==== Part 3 ====
Dmitri Mikhailov (ドミートリィ・ミハイロフ)
Half-brother to Alexei.
Lyudmil Yusupov (リュドミール・ユスーポフ)
Sergei Rostovsky (セルゲイ・ロストフスキー)
Captain Rostovsky. A loyal follower of Prince Yusupov.
Adele (アデール)
Antonina Kulikovskaya (アントニーナ・クリコフスカヤ)
Alexander Strakhov (アレクサンドル・ストラーホフ)
Head of Russian Music academy. Count Strakhov is a husband of Anastasia. Assassinated by Mikhail Karnakov.
Ustinov (ウスチノフ)
Shura (シューラ)
Fyodor Zubovsky (フョードル・ズボフスキー)
Galina (ガリーナ)
Mikhail Karnakov (ミハイル・カルナコフ)
Yuri Pleshkov (ユーリィ・プレシコフ)

===== Historical characters =====
Rasputin (ラスプーチン)
Russian mystic monk who exerts influence in the court. In Ikeda's story, man of insatiable desire for power. The model is historical Grigori Rasputin.
Nikolai II (ニコライ2世) and Alexandra Fyodorovna (アレクサンドラ・フョードロヴナ)
Tsar (Emperor) and Tsarina (Empress) of the Russian Empire. Tsarina Alexandra deeply believes in Rasputin who heals her son Crown Prince Alexei. Nikolai II is the last Emperor of Russia. Prince Yusupov submits a cabinet to Imperial sanction in order to help the Empire. But Tsar Nikolai doesn't give in. It brings the end of the Romanov Russia. Their models are historical Nikolai II and Alexandra.
Kerensky (ケレンスキー)
Leader of the Socialist Revolutionary Party. Enemy of Prince Yusupov. He wins Yusupov and grasps the power, but is defeated by the Bolsheviks. The model is historical Alexander Kerensky.

== Structure of story ==
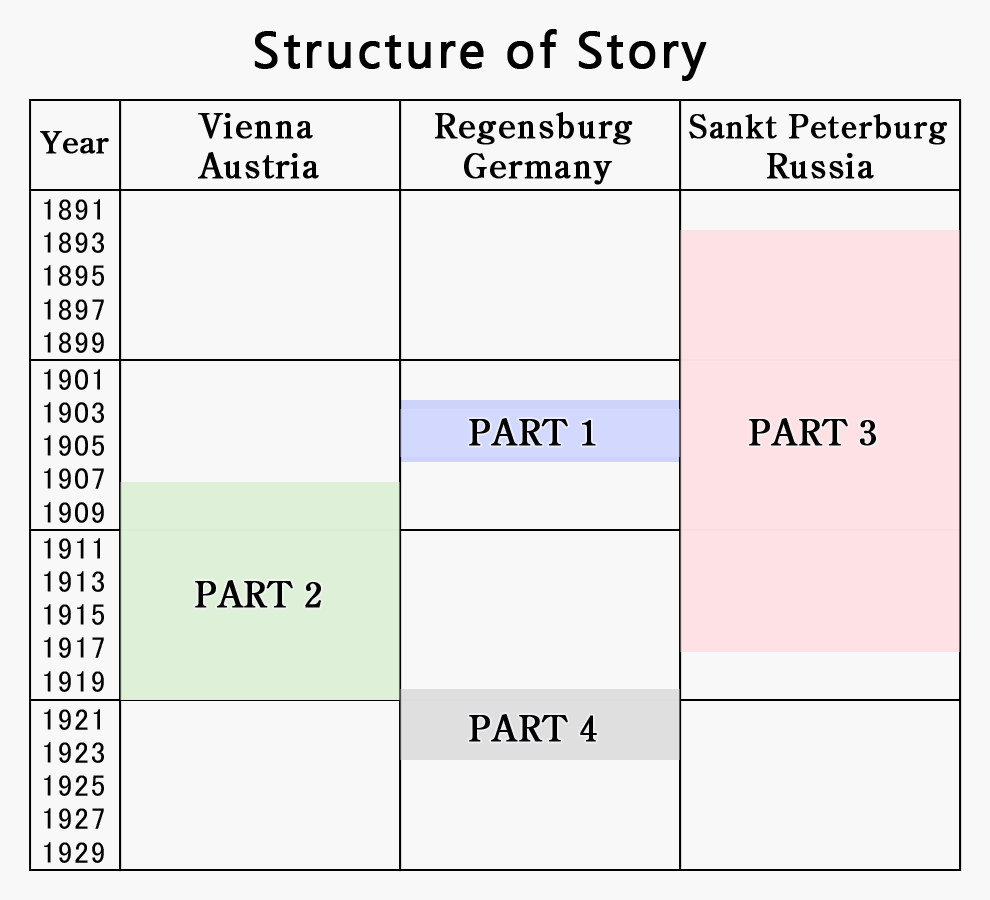

The Window of Orpheus has a bit complicated structure. The story consists of the four Parts. But from the contents of each part, it can be said that there are three independent stories. These stories are apparently assigned to each Part.

- Story 1: The Story of the Secret of the House Ahrensmeyer (Part 1, Part 4)
- Story 2: The Story of Isaak and the Music (Part1, Part 2, Part 4)
- Story 3: The Story of the Russian Revolution (Part 3)

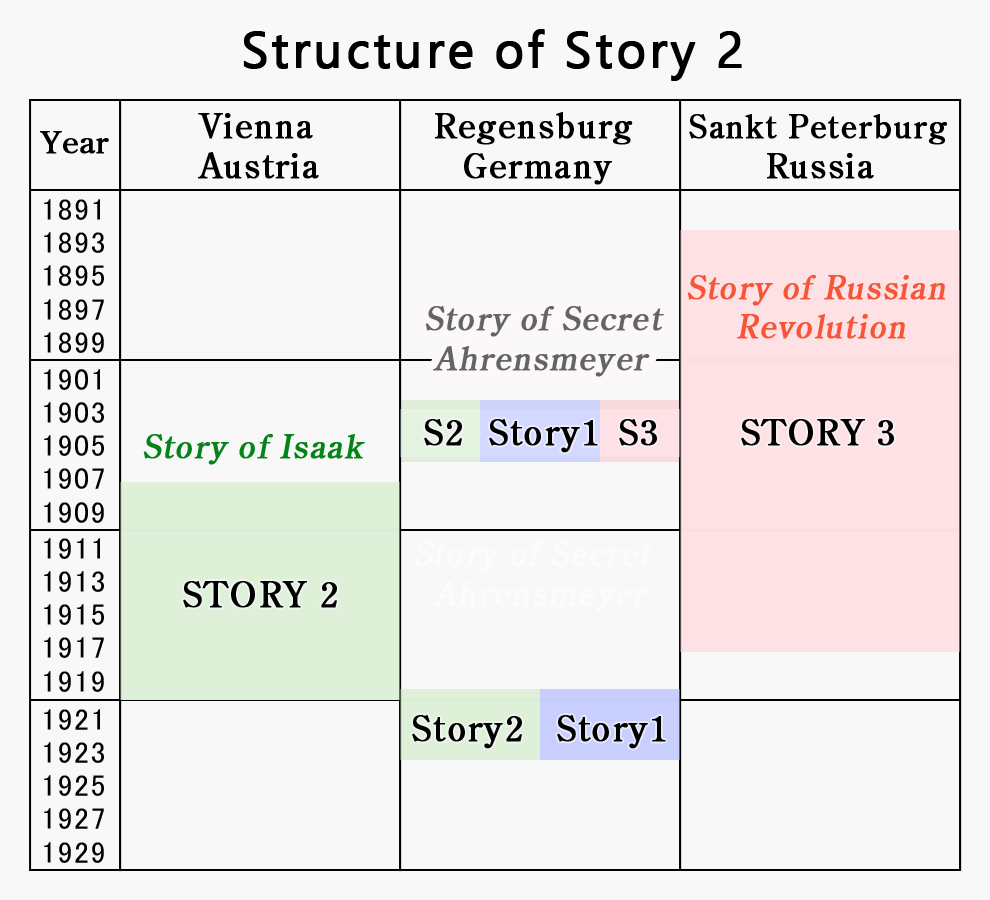

Part 1 contains the prologue of the Story 2, and it contains the interlogue of the Story 3. And Part 4 contains both the epilogue of the Story 1 and the Story 2. And the Story 2 isn't finished here in the original plan.

At the first vision of the author, it was the story of a pianist and the music. That is, the Story 2 - Isaak and the Music was "the Window of Orpheus". The Story of Isaak and the Story of Russian Revolution have no relation. Alexei was created to introduce the Russian Revolution. And Julius was formed to connect these situations.

In the plan of the author, the story was scheduled to continue after the death of Alexei and Julius. The son of Isaak, Jubel, would be a great pianist, and Isaak himself would be a grand master Composer in Vienna. But Ikeda could not write these stories, and therefore The Window of Orpheus is her "Life Work".

== Reception ==
The Window of Orpheus is one of the representative Japanese shōjo manga in 1970s. Another Ikeda's work The Rose of Versailles has had higher reputation and popularity. But according to one editor, Orpheus has a higher completeness than Versailles in the view point of the artistic achievement as manga story, including its picture quality.

The 1970s is the epoch for Japanese shōjo manga from the various view points in cultural and social phenomena. The fruits of the Year 24 Group were ripened in this period, and the Japanese manga and subcultural industries themselves had largely developed and diversified in this epoch.

Frederick Schodt introduced the Japanese manga culture in the 1970s in his book. In the section "Flowers and Dreams", there are about 20 these images selected and shown. One of them is the scene from the Window of Orpheus. The image presented is the last scene of Marquis Yusupov.

== Publication of Margaret comics ==
The manga series was published in 18 bound volumes in Margaret comics series of Shueisha.

Vol.	Subtitle	Subtitle (Japanese)	Pages	Release	N	ISBN	Ref	Part	Pb
01	Futari no Tennyūsei	ふたりの転入生の巻	185 +1	1976-0320	227	ISBN 4-08-850227-2	ref	Part 1	Mg
02	Klaus no Himitsu	クラウスの秘密の巻	183 +3	1976-0420	230	ISBN 4-08-850230-2	ref	Part 1	Mg
03	Kānibaru no Dekigoto	カーニバルの出来事の巻	180 +4	1976-0820	247	ISBN 4-08-850247-7	ref	Part 1	Mg
04	Izāku no Shōrai wa...	イザークの将来は…の巻	182 +2	1976-0920	251	ISBN 4-08-850251-5	ref	Part 1	Mg
05	Yuriusu no Himitsu	ユリウスの秘密の巻	188 +2	1976-1120	259	ISBN 4-08-850259-0	ref	Part 1	Mg
06	Furiderīke no Shi	フリデリーケの死の巻	199 +3	1976-1220	263	ISBN 4-08-850263-9	ref	Part 1	Mg
07	Kōchōsensei no Kokuhaku	校長先生の告白の巻	183 +3	1977-0120	266	ISBN 4-08-850266-3	ref	Part 1	Mg
08	Mi mo Kokoro mo Koi ni Moete...	身も心も恋に燃えて…の巻	177 +3	1978-0120	321	ISBN 4-08-850321-X	ref	Part 2	Sv
09	Nengan no Debut	念願のデビューの巻	177 +3	1978-0220	326	ISBN 4-08-850326-0	ref	Part 2	Sv
10	Yubi... ga Ugokanai!!	指…が動かない！の巻	177 +3	1978-0320	329	ISBN 4-08-850329-5	ref	Part 2	Sv
11	Gekidō no Arashi no Naka de...	激動の嵐の中で…の巻	193 +3	1979-0120	380	ISBN 4-08-850380-5	ref	Part 3	Sv
12	Yureugoku Ai to Nikushimi...	ゆれうごく愛と憎しみ…の巻	209 +1	1979-1225	448	ISBN 4-08-850448-8	ref	Part 3	Sv
13	Saikai wa Shitakeredo...	再会はしたけれど…の巻	205 +1	1980-0228	460	ISBN 4-08-850460-7	ref	Part 3	Sv
14	Datsugoku Kekkō!!	脱獄決行!!の巻	179 +1	1981-0130	543	ISBN 4-08-850543-3	ref	Part 3	Sv
15	Mō... Omae wo Hanasanai!!	もう…おまえを離さない!!の巻	177 +1	1981-0228	552	ISBN 4-08-850552-2	ref	Part 3	Sv
16	Yuriusu ga Haha ni...	ユリウスが母に…の巻	179 +1	1981-0830	600	ISBN 4-08-850600-6	ref	Part 3	Sv
17	Yusūpofu-kō no Saigo	ユスーポフ侯の最期の巻	177 +1	1981-0930	607	ISBN 4-08-850607-3	ref	Part 3	Sv
18	Sayōnara Yuriusu!!	さようならユリウス!!の巻	204 +2	1981-1030	614	ISBN 4-08-850614-6	ref	Part 4	Sv

"Mg" indicates stories are published in weekly Margaret. "Sv" indicate stories are published in monthly Seventeen.

== General publication ==
There are various versions of Japanese manga books of The Window of Orpheus. In Japanese, five real paper book series and one E-book series are known. The manga series is also published in the languages other than Japanese.

=== Japanese language ===
Title	Series	Form	Publisher	Release	Volume	Complete	ISBN	Ref	Remark
Orufeusu no Mado	Margaret comics	tankōbon	Shueisha	1981	18	Yes	ISBN 978-4088502274	ref	
Orufeusu no Mado	Aizōban	A5	Chuokoronsha	1988	4	Yes	ISBN 4-12-001640-4	ref	Paperback
Orufeusu no Mado	Comic bunko	bunko	Shueisha	1995	9	Yes	ISBN 978-4086170017	ref	
Orufeusu no Mado	Girls Remix	B6	Shueisha	2003	8	Yes	ISBN 978-4081064359	ref	(conveni-book)
Orufeusu no Mado	Fairbell comics	bunko	Fairbell	2005	13	Yes	ISBN 978-4902026481	ref	(conveni-book)
Orufeusu no Mado	Amazon Kindle	E-Book	Fairbell	2014	18	Yes	-	ref	E-Book

=== Other languages ===
Language	Title	Form	Publisher	Release	Volume	Complete	ISBN	Ref	Remark
English	The Window of Orpheus	(on-line)	(private translation)	-	-	(uncertain)	-	-	(uncertain)
Spanish	La ventana de Orfeo	Paperback	Ediciones Glénat España SL	2008	13	maybe	ISBN	ref, ref	ref:amazon.es
Italian	La finestra di Orfeo	Paperback	Planet Manga	2004	14	Yes	?	ref, ref	
Indonesian	Jendela Orpheus	Paperback	PT Elex Media	1996?	18	Yes	?	ref	
Korean	오르페우스의 창	Paperback	Crew	2012	18	maybe	ISBN	ref, ref	
Vietnamese	Của sổ Orpheus	(on-line)	(private translation)	?	?	?	-	ref	(uncertain)
French	La fenêtre d'Orphée	(on-line)	(private translation)	-	-	(uncertain)	-	-	(uncertain)

== Sources ==
=== Primary sources ===
- (ja) [Ikeda 1981] Ikeda, Riyoko Orufeusu no Mado, Magaret comics (manga tankōbon), 18 volumes, 1976 to 1981, Shueisha
- (ja) [Ikeda 1995] Ikeda, Riyoko Orufeusu no Mado, 9 volumes (bunkobon version, in Japanese), 1995, Shueisha

=== Secondary sources ===
- (ja) [Encyclopedia 2005] Orufeusu no Mado Daijiten - Sonderausgabe zum 30-jährigen Jubiläum, 2005, Shueisha ISBN 4-08-782095-5
- (ja) [Sekai 2012] Ikeda Riyoko no Sekai - ASAHI Original 389, 2012, Asahishinbun Shuppan, ISBN 978-4-02-272424-3
- (ja) [Konagi 2011] Konagai, Nobumasa Watashi no Shōjo manga Shi, 2011, Nishida Shoten ISBN 978-4-88866-544-5
- (ja) [Daijisen on-line] Digital Daijisen (大辞泉), on-line Japanese dictionary, 2020, Shougakukan
- (ja) [Takarazuka pamphlet] Takarazuka Revue pamphlet: Orufeusu no Mado - Issak-hen,
- (en) [Shodt 1983] Schodt, Frederick L. Manga! Manga! The World of Japanese Comics, 1983, 2012, Kodansha USA, ISBN 978-1-56836-476-6

=== Website ===
- (ja) Isaak fan Personal website (fansite)
- (ja) [Amazon-jp] amazon.co.jp - on-line book store
