= Ten no Hate Made – Poland Hishi =

Manga by Riyoko Ikeda

- Volume 1 cover art

天の涯まで ポーランド秘史
- Genre: Historical, drama
- Manga
- Written by: Riyoko Ikeda
- Published by: Asahi Shimbun; Asahi Bunko
- Original run: 1991 – 1993
- Volumes: 3

Ten no Hate Made – Poland Hishi (Japanese: 天の涯まで～ポーランド秘史; lit. 'Poland's Secret Story: To the Borders of Heaven') is a Japanese historical manga series written and illustrated by Riyoko Ikeda depicting the life of Polish Prince Józef Poniatowski in the turbulent last days of the Polish–Lithuanian Commonwealth and the dawn of the Napoleonic Wars.

First published in Japan in 1991, it was the first legally published manga in Poland (as Polish: Aż do nieba: tajemnicza historia Polski), released from 1996 to 1997 by Polish manga publisher Japonica Polonica Fantastica. Its publication is considered an important event in the development of manga and anime fandom in Poland, where it helped popularize manga.

Ten no Hate Made blends historical events with fictionalized and romanticized elements, often drawing from Polish romantic myths. The work has been praised for its depiction of Polish history and culture, including architecture and costumes, though it has also faced criticism for its historical inaccuracies and melodramatic portrayals. The manga shares thematic and stylistic similarities with Ikeda's other works, such as Eikou no Napoleon – Eroica and The Rose of Versailles, and is regarded as a rare example of Japanese manga exploring Polish history.

== Plot ==
The main character of the manga is Prince Józef Poniatowski. The manga is divided into three volumes; the first covers the childhood of the main character, the second covers his later years up to the Polish–Russian War of 1792 in defense of the Constitution of 3 May 1791, and the third continues the story of Prince Poniatowski until his death at the Battle of Leipzig in 1813.

== History ==
=== In Japan ===
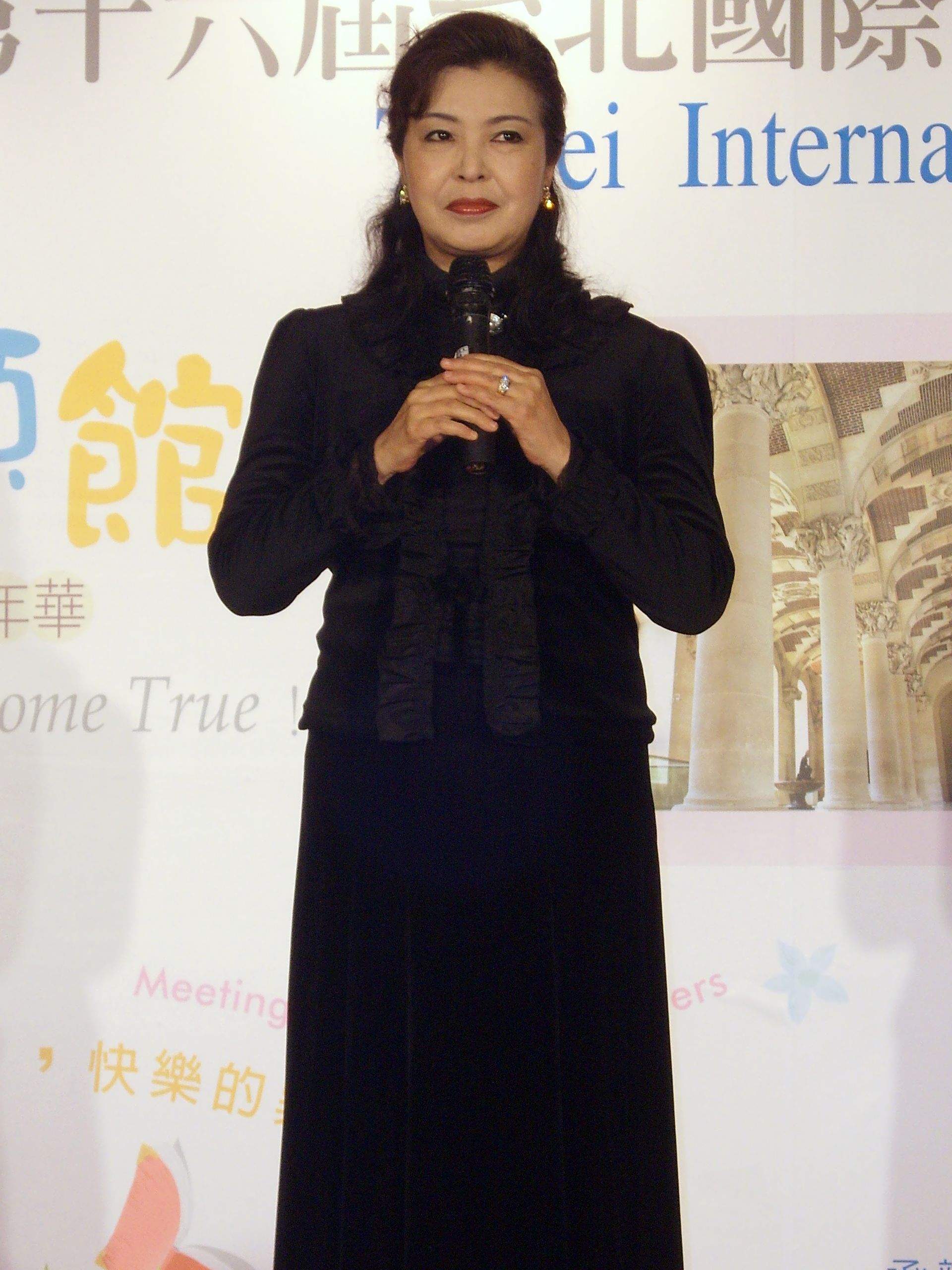
Riyoko Ikeda, author of Ten no Hate Made – Poland Hishi

The manga was created by Riyoko Ikeda, a popular Japanese author of historical manga. Ikeda became interested in Polish history after her sister visited Poland.

The manga was produced in the 1990s and was first published in Japan in 1991. In Japan, the manga has seen several editions: published by Asahi Bunko/Asahi Shimbun (1991–1993), Chuko Aizōban/Chuokoron-Shinsha (1994), Chuko Bunko/Chuokoron-Shinsha (1999), and, digitally, Fairbell (2013).

=== In Poland ===
The manga was published in Poland in three volumes from 1996 to 1997 by Japonica Polonica Fantastica; the first volume was released in July 1996 and the event has been described as the beginning of the manga and anime fandom in Poland. It was translated into Polish by Shin Yasuda, the founder of Japonica Polonica Fantastica, a Japanese resident in Poland. He translated the manga as part of his Polish language studies and decided to publish the translation after establishing the publishing house.

Ten no Hate Made was the first manga published in Poland, respecting copyright law. It is sometimes incorrectly described as the first manga published in Poland: that title belongs to Black Knight Batto (known in the West as Black Knight Bat) by Buichi Terasawa, which was published in 1986 in serialized form in the magazine SFera without the author's permission. In 2008, Ten no Hate Made was reissued in a single-volume edition.

== Analysis ==
Angieszka Włodarczyk described the manga is a classic example of josei manga (aimed at adult women); however another reviewer classified the work as shōjo manga (manga aimed at teenage girls).

Several scholars and critics commented on Ikeda's choice of Poland and Polish history as its primary setting. Małgorzata Rutkowska, in Załącznik Kulturoznawczy in 2014, believed that the choice of this manga as the first title published by Japonica Polonica Fantastica was deliberate, given its Polish theme. Anna Juozulinas in her article in the journal Argumenta Historica in 2022 described the manga as "bringing Polish history at the turn of the 18th and 19th centuries closer to readers", and Katarzyna Bikowska, writing in 2013 in Biuletyn EBIB (EBIB Bulletin) magazine, noted that due to its Polish setting, the manga is a valuable addition to Polish libraries. Similarly, Katarzyna Maciakiewicz, writing in 2018 in Annales Universitatis Paedagogicae Cracoviensis. Studia ad Didacticam Biologiae Pertinentia, found the manga intriguing for Polish readers. In her analysis, she stated that "the author does not depict real events in her manga and even embellishes history for the sake of the title", but at the same time "presents authentic costumes, architecture, and locations from the era". Wojciech Obremski, in his 2005 book Krótka historia sztuki komiksu w Polsce: 1945–2003 (Short History of Comic Art in Poland: 1945–2003), positively evaluated the comic, highlighting its educational value and praising, among other things, "the faithful depiction of buildings, such as the Royal Castle in Warsaw, the Palace on the Isle, and the tenements in Warsaw's Old Town".

Justyna Czaja offered a more critical analysis of the manga in a chapter dedicated to it in the book Wobec romantyzmu... (Facing Romantism...). According to Czaja, the manga offers a simplified history of Poniatowski, based on Polish romantic myths (such as legends of the Uhlans and Napoleon) and pop culture elements. Many characters are idealized. The depiction of Poniatowski's life is sanitized compared to historical accounts (the real Poniatowski was criticized for "moral excesses, numerous love affairs, sybaritism, [and...] a lavish lifestyle", and troublesome relation with his relative, King Stanisław August Poniatowski – none of which appear in the manga). His romance with Henriette de Vauban is described by Czaja as "a trivialized pop culture romance". Czaja also criticized the portrayal of Polish military leader Tadeusz Kościuszko, who is devoid of "individual traits and represents a conventional hero-patriot type", noting that Kościuszko is beautified in the manga ("fitting into the stereotypical portrayal of a 'leader's' appearance") and lacks his trademark peasant characteristics (such as peasant attire he was fond of wearing). Czaja concludes that "Ikeda shows how mythologized biographies of heroes and national history look when filtered through the pop culture lens" and describes the manga as "a melodrama with a patriotic character".

Examples of historical changes made in the manga to enrich familial and romantic themes include replacing the real sister of Poniatowski with a fictional brother and worsening the relationship between Poniatowski's mother and her son. Another ahistorical element is the author's joke – a scene where the prince draws manga. The very title of the manga (To the Borders of Heaven) is derived from a lofty monologue, supposedly delivered by Poniatowski shortly before his death that has since been proven by historians to be a fabrication by later chroniclers. The portrayal of Poniatowski and other characters in manga style was also considered "unusual" for this subject by several scholars and reviewers.

The manga is related to other titles by Ikeda (Eikou no Napoleon – Eroica, The Rose of Versailles), as they all share a similar setting (characters and time period related to the era of Napoleonic Wars). However, The Rose of Versailles was published in Poland only in 2016, despite having been announced as "forthcoming" in the first edition of Polish edition of Ten no Hate Made, which led to it being described as "the longest-awaited manga in Poland".

== Reception ==
In 1997, Michał Janowski reviewed the manga for the newspaper Rzeczpospolita. According to the reviewer, the dramatic events of Polish history often become amusing when translated into the comic medium. He particularly criticized the excessive use of manga onomatopoeia, which he found distracting or inappropriate at times. Janowski also deemed the historical narrative overly simplified due to the comic format's constraints on text length, and he criticized the inaccurate rendering of non-Polish character names, noting, "It is also unclear why Louis XV (Polish: Ludwik XV) is called Luis XV, and Frederick II (Polish: Fryderyk II) is Fridrich II".

In 1998, Tomasz Tekliński reviewed the manga for the magazine Machina, criticizing the medium and content for the "typical simplicity of spirit [found] in manga". He was also not impressed by the application of the manga art style to the Polish setting, stating that "the depiction of a young Kościuszko with a mongoloid appearance reminiscent of 'Sailor Moon' will astonish even the most resistant".

A 2006 review on the Polish portal Manga Tanuki noted that, in the context of their classification of the manga as aimed at female readership, that despite the manga's focus on a soldier's life, it is "psychologically refined, with interpersonal relationships being the main plot thread" and "emotionally charged". The review highlighted the significance of relationships between historical figures, such as "the lifelong romance of Józef with Henriette de Vauban, his friendship with Tadeusz Kościuszko, and the hostility between his brother and stepmother". The reviewer, who identified as a historian, also noted that while the manga has educational value and depicts Polish history relatively accurately, it includes some deliberate historical inaccuracies for narrative purposes. The quality of the publication was praised, but the translation was criticized as "sometimes stiff", and the "European-style publication" (changing from right-to-left reading order to left-to-right) was also noted.

In 2012, another reviewer on the same portal reviewed the 2008 reissue, writing: "The struggle for the homeland intertwines with romance, creating an engaging mix. Although Ikeda is not always completely faithful to the facts, her treatment of Polish history is still impressive". However, the review criticized the reissue for lacking improvements or corrections compared to the first edition. Both reviewers on Manga Tanuki also praised the author for noting most of the ahistorical changes in the manga's comments.

The authors of Takeda biography at Grodzisk Mazowiecki Library described the manga as successful in Poland and helping popularize manga in that country.

== See also ==
- The Rose of Versailles – a manga by the same author set before and during the French Revolution.
- Eikou no Napoleon – Eroica – a continuation of The Rose of Versailles; a manga by the same author set in the Napoleonic era, which also features Prince Poniatowski.

== Bibliography ==
- Reczulski, Łukasz (2023). Narodziny i rozkwit Polskiej Rzeczypospolitej Mangowej [The Birth and Flourishing of the Polish Manga Republic] (in Polish). Łódź: Instytut Archeologii Uniwersytetu Łódzkiego. ISBN 978-83-963463-7-7.
