= Lady Oscar (film) =

1979 French-Japanese film

- English theatrical poster
- Directed by: Jacques Demy
- Screenplay by: Patricia Louisianna Knop
- Story by: Jacques Demy; Patricia Louisianna Knop
- Based on: The Rose of Versailles by Riyoko Ikeda
- Produced by: Mataichirô Yamamoto
- Starring: Catriona MacColl; Barry Stokes; Christine Böhm; Jonas Bergström; Terence Budd
- Cinematography: Jean Penzer
- Edited by: Paul Davies
- Music by: Michel Legrand
- Production company: Kitty Music Corporation
- Distributed by: Toho (Japan); Ciné-Tamaris (France)
- Release dates: March 3, 1979 (Japan); April 26, 1980 (France)
- Running time: 124 minutes
- Country: Japan; France
- Language: English
- Box office: $220,000

Lady Oscar (Note: Released in Japan as Berusaiyu no Bara (ベルサイユのばら; "The Rose of Versailles")) is a 1979 English-Language French-Japanese romantic historical drama film, adapted from the 1972 Japanese manga The Rose of Versailles by Riyoko Ikeda. It was directed by Jacques Demy and written by Demy and Patricia Louisianna Knop, with music from Demy's frequent collaborator Michel Legrand. The film stars Catriona MacColl as Oscar François de Jarjayes, a woman who serves as commander of the Royal Guards at the Palace of Versailles under Marie Antoinette.

The film was a production of Kitty Music in association with Shiseido, Nippon Television and Toho, and was filmed on location in France. Lady Oscar was released in Japan on March 3, 1979, by Toho and in France on April 26, 1980, by Ciné-Tamaris. It performed poorly at the box office, and received mixed reviews from critics.

== Plot ==
General Jarjayes' wife dies while giving birth to a baby girl. Frustrated by this and refusing to believe his wife would die without giving him a male heir, the General names the girl Oscar François de Jarjayes and decides to raise her as a boy. He tells his housekeeper that her son, André, will grow up with Oscar and become her best friend, as the General believes the girl should be around men. As the years go by, the two children grow up to be inseparable friends, while Oscar learns to sword-fight and behaves like a boy. Despite belonging to a different social strata from Oscar, André starts developing romantic feelings for her. However, she sees their relationship as nothing more than a brotherly bond, a view shaped by her adherence to aristocratic values.

The Queen of France, Marie Antoinette, like many within the aristocracy, is fascinated by Oscar and eventually decides to give her an honored position as a personal guard. The Queen, a vain ruler who does not care about the terrible conditions in which the commoners of France live, is unsatisfied with her arranged marriage to the King and does not love him. She decides to have a lover, aristocrat Hans Axel Von Fersen. This secret eventually becomes public knowledge and becomes further proof of the Crown's hypocrisy. The people of France get angrier and their hunger for Revolution gets even stronger.

André, now a common stable boy in Paris, lives away from Versailles and the aristocracy and thus is more aware of the plight of the poor. He believes a revolution is needed for all citizens to live as equals and tries to show Oscar, who lives a more secluded and ostentatious life, his point of view. Despite recognizing the difficult situation outside of the castle's walls, Oscar remains loyal to the Crown and starts developing feelings for Fersen.

At a masked ball, André reveals to Oscar that he is in love with her and even tries to kiss her. Shocked by this, Oscar does not share his feelings. Despite this, the two remain friends.

In 1789, when the French Revolution begins, Oscar receives orders to shoot on the protestors outside Versailles. She and other guards refuse to do this and get sent to jail. Moved by this, André and other revolutionaries free them before their execution. Oscar declares her love for André, and the two begin a relationship. She tries to convince her father to join their side before things get worse for the upper class, but the General refuses and even tries to kill her. In the ensuing sword fight, André defends Oscar, and the two escape the house unscathed. During the taking of the Bastille, however, André dies, leaving Oscar to look for his body among all the commotion.

== Cast ==
- Catriona MacColl as Oscar François de Jarjayes
  - Patsy Kensit as young Oscar
- Barry Stokes as André Grandier
  - Andrew Bagley as young André
- Jonas Bergström as Hans Axel von Fersen
- Christine Böhm as Marie Antoinette
- Mark Kingston as General Jarjayes
- Georges Wilson as General Bouillé
- Martin Potter as Count de Girodelle
- Sue Lloyd as Duchess de Polignac
- Anouska Hempel as Jeanne Valois de la Motte
- Terence Budd as Louis XVI
- Mike Marshall as Nicolas de la Motte
- Christopher Ellison as Robespierre
- Constance Chapman as Nanny
- Gregory Floy as Cardinal de Rohan
- Shelagh McLeod as Rosalie Lamorlière
- Michael Osborne as Bernard Chatelet
- Angela Thorne as Mademoiselle Bertin
- Paul Spurrier as Prince Louis Joseph
- Rose Mary Dunham as Marquise de Boulainvilliers
- Michael Petrovitch as Charles Alexandre de Calonne
- Lambert Wilson as Cocky Soldier
- Vincent Grass as Insolent Soldier
- Caroline Loeb as Adele

== Production ==
The major sponsor of the film was Shiseido, a cosmetics company, and Catriona MacColl promoted a red lipstick for the spring cosmetic line that year. Frederik L. Schodt translated the entire manga series into English as a reference for the producers of this film, but gave the only copy of the translation to them and it was lost.

The production was based at Auditel Studios in Paris, with filming locations including Jossigny, Senlis, and the Palace of Versailles.

== Reception ==
The film was not a commercial success, and Catriona MacColl's portrayal of Oscar, in particular, was criticized. Conversely, Variety described the film as recalling early Hollywood epics, and praised MacColl's depiction of Oscar as a "woman waiting to burst out of a man's clothing".

Kevin Thomas, writing for the Los Angeles Times, described the film as a typical Jacques Demy film, noting its preoccupation with contrasting the lives of the aristocrats and the lives of the poor. Anne Duggan took a similar view when situating Lady Oscar within the context of Demy's other films. Duggan describes Ikeda's Oscar as having "more self-knowledge" in some respects than the Oscar of the film, who therefore has arguably less agency, whereas "Demy goes further than Ikeda in challenging the tradition of the maiden warrior by questioning the implicit class prejudices underlying the order that upholds forms of aristocratic heroism".

== Bibliography ==
- "Lady Oscar", Variety, vol. v297, Reed Business Information, Inc. (US), pp. 34(1), 1979-12-19, ISSN 0042-2738
