= Eikou no Napoleon – Eroica =

Japanese manga series

- Héroïque - The Glory of Napoleon
- Cover of the first book.

栄光のナポレオン - エロイカ (Eikou no Naporeon - Eroika)
- Genre: Historical, Drama
- Manga
- Written by: Riyoko Ikeda
- Published by: Chuoukouronsha
- Magazine: Fujin Kōron
- Original run: 1986 – 1995
- Volumes: 12

Héroïque - The Glory of Napoleon (栄光のナポレオン - エロイカ, Eikō no Naporeon - Eroika) is a manga by Riyoko Ikeda that is the official sequel to The Rose of Versailles.

It tells the story of Napoleon's empire, including the Thermidorian Reaction, the Italian Campaign, the Egyptian Campaign, the Battle of the Nile, the coup of 18 Brumaire, the French invasion of Russia, and the Battle of Waterloo.

It also includes some characters from the prequel manga, like Alain de Soissons, Bernard Chatelet, and Rosalie Lamorlière.

== Characters ==
=== Real characters ===
- Napoleon Bonaparte: the main protagonist of the story.
- Joséphine de Beauharnais: the female protagonist of the story.
- Marie Louise of Austria:
- Charles Maurice de Talleyrand-Périgord:
- Joseph Fouché:
- Désirée Clary:
- Eugène de Beauharnais:
- Hortense de Beauharnais:
- Joseph Bonaparte: one of Napoleon's older brothers.
- Pauline Bonaparte:
- Joachim Murat:
- François-Paul Brueys d'Aigalliers:
- Pierre-Charles Villeneuve:
- Alexander I of Russia: the main antagonist in the last part of the story.
- Prince Klemens Wenzel von Metternich:
- William Pitt the Younger:
- Marie Walewska:
- Horatio Nelson, 1st Viscount Nelson:
- Mikhail Illarionovich Kutuzov:
- Carl von Clausewitz:
- Arthur Wellesley, 1st Duke of Wellington:
- Józef Antoni Poniatowski: Riyoko Ikeda wrote his story as Ten no Hate Made in 1991. The later part of the story is written almost same as a part of Eroica, but from aspect of Poniatowski.
- Murad Bey:

=== Fictional characters ===
- Alain de Soissons (1760–1804): a character from the prequel, was the sergeant of the Company B, the troops assigned to Lady Oscar's service in the National Guard. Survived the French Revolution and the Terror, he also appears in the sequel and is the coprotagonist in the first part of this story.
- Bernard Chatelet (1760–1804): a returning character from the prequel.
- Rosalie Chatelet (née Lamorlière): a returning character from the prequel, was a real person, although her life and marriage were much fictionalized. Since then, she married Bernard Chatelet and had a son, Francois.
- François Chatelet: the only son of Bernard and Rosalie, born in 1789.
- Catherine Renaudin (Madame de Talleyrand): the main antagonist in the first part of the story. Catherine is the new love interest of Alain, but she is deeply royalist.
- Oscar François de Jarjayes (1755–1789): although she had died during the prequel, is often seen only in flashback in the first part of this story.

== See also ==
- The Rose of Versailles
- Ten no Hate Made – Poland Hishi
