= Stolen Heaven (1974 film) =

- Directed by: Theo Maria Werner
- Written by: Géza von Cziffra
- Produced by: Theo Maria Werner
- Starring: Siegfried Rauch; Hans Holt; Christine Böhm
- Cinematography: Hans Jura
- Edited by: Hans Zeiler
- Music by: Peter Kreuder
- Production companies: Monti Film; Regina-Film
- Distributed by: Gloria Film
- Release date: 1974
- Running time: 90 minutes
- Countries: Italy; West Germany
- Language: German

Stolen Heaven (German: Der gestohlene Himmel, Italian: Il cielo rubato) is a 1974 Italian-German drama film directed by Theo Maria Werner and starring Siegfried Rauch, Hans Holt, and Christine Böhm.

It was partly shot on location in the Zillertal in the Austrian state of Tyrol.

== Cast ==
- Siegfried Rauch as Jungpfarrer Franz Gruber
- Hans Holt as Altpfarrer Julius Bachmayer
- Christine Böhm as Barbara Brandner
- Maria Andergast as Mutter Brandner
- Michael Negri as Hannes Reyer
- Walter Sedlmayr as Franz Josef Reyer
- Maria Sigg as Walburga Reyer
- Wolf Goldan as Ernst Nortinger
- Rut Rex as Eva Siebert
- Johannes Wildauer as Korbinian Nortinger
- Susi Engel as Christl Siebert
- Michael Cramer as Lehrer Berger
- Andreas Bäuerl as Tankwart
- Franziska Stömmer as Frau Seidl
- Willy Harlander as Revierinspektor
- Michele Borelli as Kriminalkommissar Mario Raabe
- Franz Muxeneder as Wurzelsepp
- Gustl Gstettenbaur as Förster Auer

== Bibliography ==
- Bock, Hans-Michael & Bergfelder, Tim. The Concise Cinegraph: Encyclopaedia of German Cinema. Berghahn Books, 2009.
