= Anime and manga fandom in Poland =

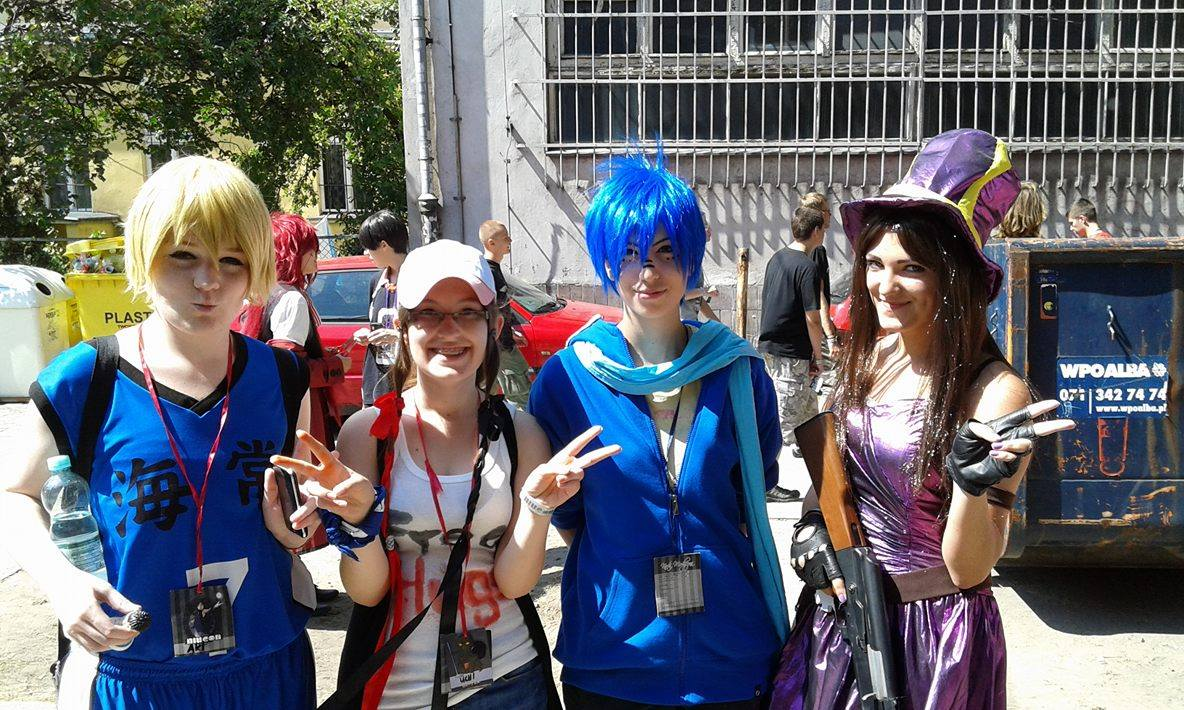
Cosplayers at the Niucon manga and anime fan convention in August 2014 in Wrocław

The anime and manga fandom has been developing in Poland since the 1990s, although certain elements could be observed in earlier decades. In the 1990s, significant influence on the popularity of anime came from broadcasts on television (Polonia 1 and Polsat) and articles describing the phenomenon of manga and anime published in video game magazines. In 1995, the first manga and anime club was established, and in 1997, the first fan convention took place. During this time, the first Polish magazines and websites dedicated to this topic were also created. The popularity of anime and manga increased with early broadcasts of series such as Sailor Moon and the activities of fansubbing groups. At the turn of the century, the fandom became more professional, organizing larger conventions, with the estimated number of fans rising to about 10,000 by the end of the 20th century.

In the 21st century, the manga and anime fandom in Poland continues to grow, attracting an increasing number of fans. The number of conventions and manga publishers has risen. By the mid-2010s, the number of fans had grown to 100,000, and the fandom had become a significant element of Polish youth culture, influencing the lifestyle and interests of young people.

== History ==
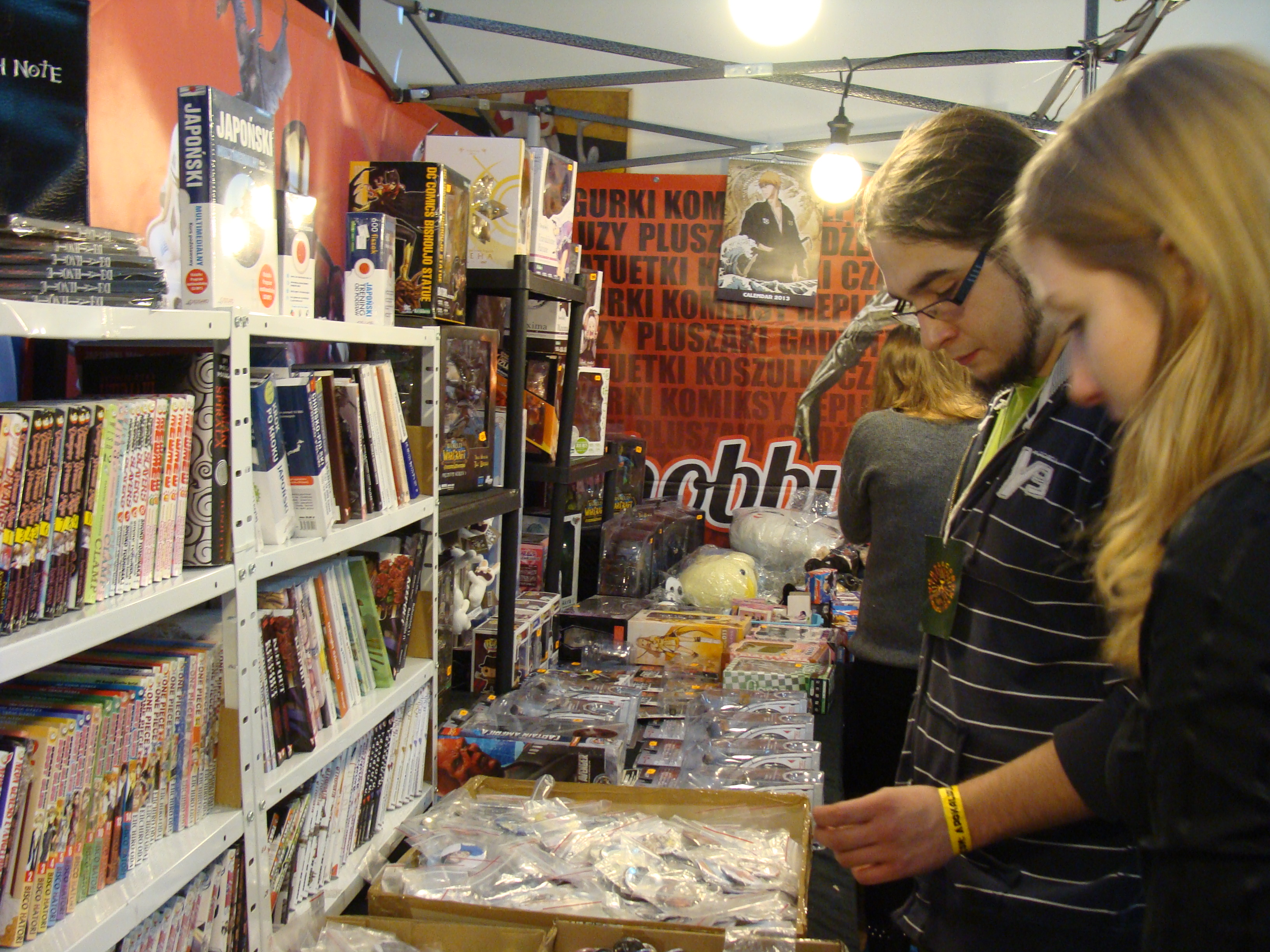
Anime and manga goods for sale in a booth at Hellcon in 2012 in Warsaw

The manga and anime fandom in Poland has been present since the mid-1990s, according to most researchers. However, the first unorganized fans of Japanese animation likely emerged in the 1970s when the Japanese animated film The Wonderful World of Puss 'n Boots was screened in Poland. By the end of the Polish People's Republic era, several titles of Japanese animation had been aired on Polish television, including early works like Vicky the Viking and Fables of the Green Forest from 1979. In the mid-1980s, the first unofficial Polish fan club for Japanese pop culture was established in Warsaw by Witold Nowakowski.

In the early 1990s, the Polonia 1 television station began airing anime, soon followed by Polsat. For many anime fans in Poland, this was the first opportunity to become acquainted with the medium, with significant contributions from VHS rental shops and the growing popularity of the Internet. Some of the earliest anime titles broadcast on these channels included Sailor Moon, Sally the Witch, and Yatterman. Robert "Mr. Root" Korzeniewski played a significant role in shaping the manga and anime fandom through his activities and publications. In 1995, he organized anime film screenings at several Polish demoscene events and wrote articles published in computer game magazines like Gambler and Secret Service, where the phenomenon of manga and anime was first overviewed in Polish media. Secret Service became the main magazine discussing Japanese pop culture in Poland for the next two years. That same year, the first manga and anime club in Poland, the Kraków club Kawaii, was established, publishing the first Polish zine on manga and anime with the same name. Over the next few years, the number of similar clubs increased significantly, although many existed for only a few years. An example of a still-existing Polish manga and anime club is the Section 9 of Śląski Klub Fantastyki, founded in 1998.

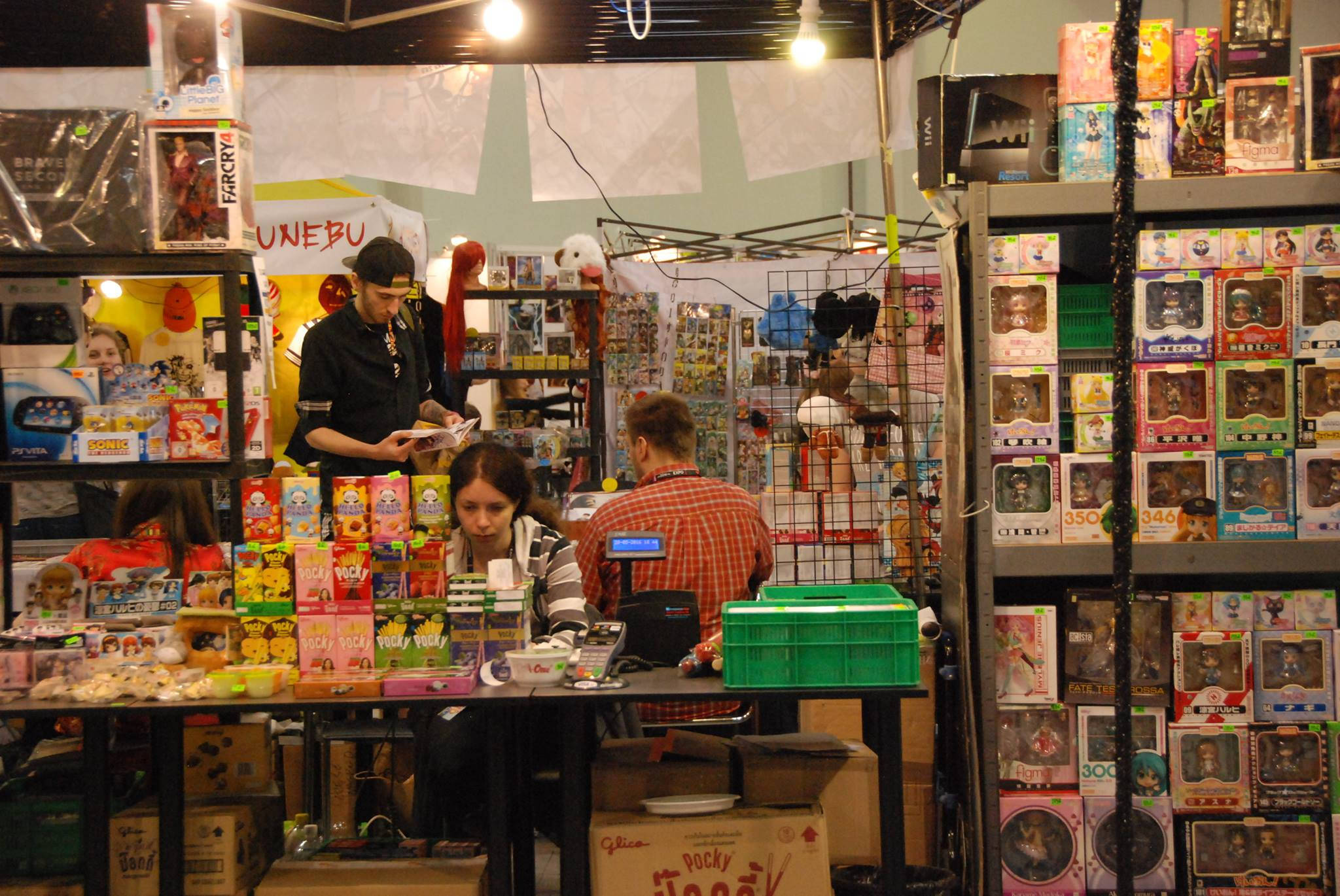
Japanese merchandise being sold at a booth at Magnificon Expo 2016 in Kraków

In 1996, the first Polish websites dedicated to manga and anime were created, along with the first Polish internet forum on this subject – the IRC channel #anime-pl. The following year saw the establishment of the Usenet group pl.rec.anime. In 1997, the first industry magazines on manga and anime were published in Poland (Kawaii and Animegaido), and the first fan convention dedicated to this topic (Manga no Sekai) was held in Gdynia in August, attracting around 50 attendees. The third edition of Manga no Sekai in 1998 marked the first cosplay event in the history of Polish manga and anime conventions, the first themed panels and lectures, and the first conference for publishers in this field. In 1997, members of the Gdynia fandom created the first Polish fansub of an anime (for the film Ranma ½: Nihao My Concubine); by the end of the decade, nearly a hundred fan groups were involved in creating fansubs, with a similar number of manga scanlation groups. The first Polish fan-made anime music video (AMV) was produced in 1998. Fan-created manga also emerged, with several dozen, and probably many more, published in the second half of the 1990s in zines, magazines, or amateur publications. Among the first was Silver Eye by Piotr Kowalski and Droga miecza (The Way of the Sword) by Krzysztof Leśniak, both from 1997.

In the late 1990s, several Polish companies began distributing anime, manga, and related products (e.g., the publishing house Japonica Polonica Fantastica, established in 1996, which released Ten no Hate Made – Poland Hishi, the first legally published and translated manga in Poland, (Note: The first manga published in Poland was released in an obscure magazine SFera in 1986, without permission from the author.) and Waneko, founded in 1999); the publication of Ten no Hate Made... has also been described as the beginning of the manga fandom in Poland. The turn of the century marked a period of professionalization for the manga and anime fandom, with the establishment of legally registered clubs (such as the Sakura no Ki Association) and well-organized conventions that attracted hundreds, sometimes close to a thousand attendees (notable examples include First Impakt, Asucon, and Dojicon; the 2008 edition of the BAKA convention set a record attendance of around 2,000 people). Attention was also drawn to copyright issues. With the increasing informatization of Polish society, the website anime.com.pl became an "unofficial center for the Polish fandom" at the beginning of the decade. Specialized groups emerged from the main anime and manga fandom, including fans of J-rock and stories about gay (yaoi) and lesbian (yuri) relationships.

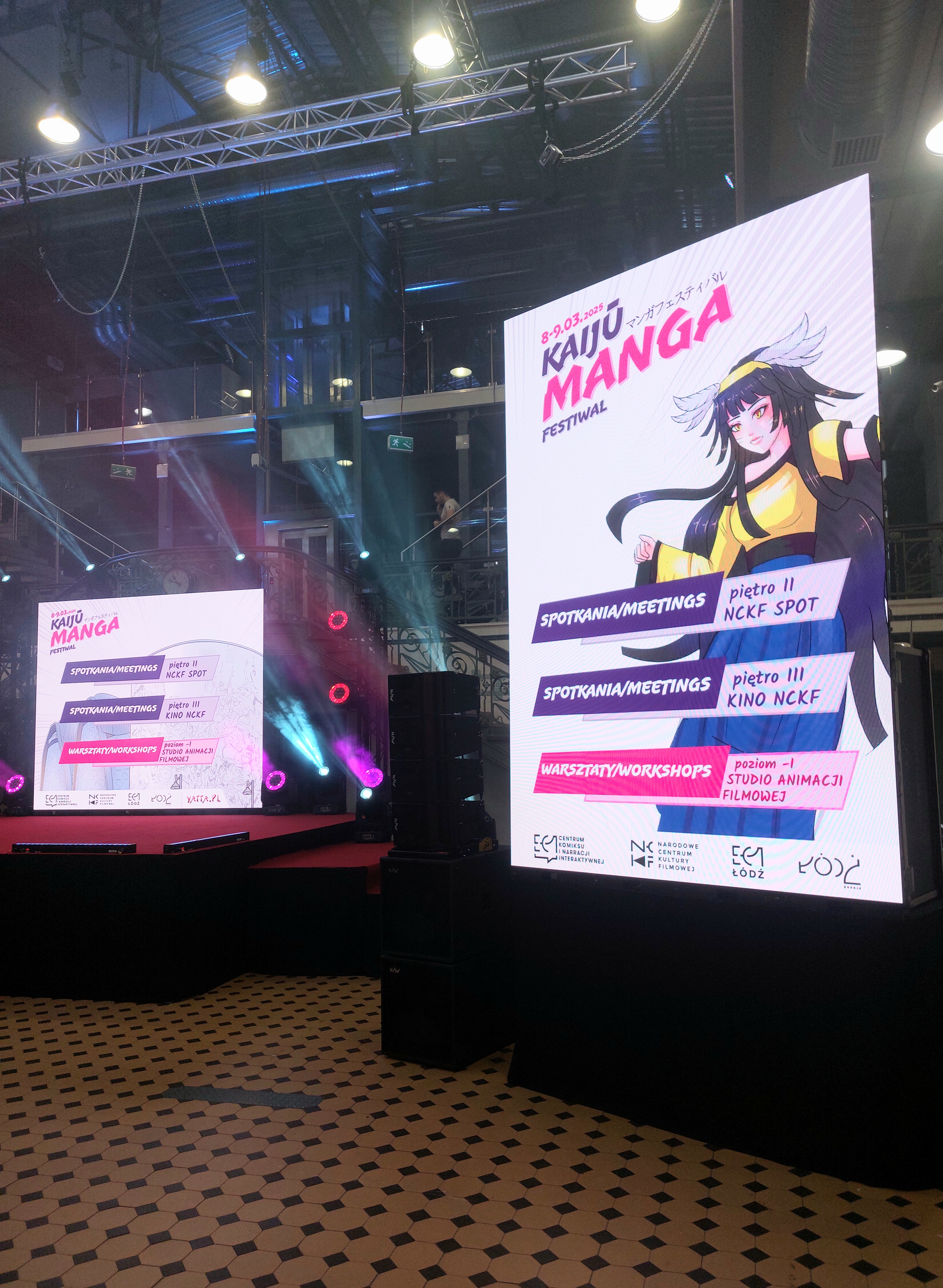
The 2025 Kaiju Manga Festiwal in Łódź

At the same time, at the turn of the millennium, the manga and anime fandom faced criticism in the media regarding violence and sexualization in manga and anime, as well as the alleged promotion of Satanism. This largely stemmed from a cultural shock experienced by older generations upon encountering Japanese "cartoons" and a lack of understanding that comics and animated films could be aimed at older audiences. As noted by Łukasz Reczulski in 2023, during this period, "some journalists and educators, alarmed by the popularity of Japanese pop culture among children and youth, painted apocalyptic visions of the inevitable demoralization of Polish society and wrote extensively about a lost generation". However, this did not come to pass, and the individuals he studied in recent years, many of whom still consider themselves part of the fandom, represent "a cross-section of a normal, healthy society".

With the development of the manga and anime fandom community in Poland, the number and size of Polish conventions increased; by the beginning of the 2000s, there was typically one convention held per month, and within a few years, the annual number reached around 30. Major Polish manga and anime conventions active in recent years include BAKA and Magnificon Expo.

According to Łukasz Reczulski, the popularization of anime and manga in Poland occurred earlier than in many other European countries, especially in Central and Eastern Europe. Reczulski attributes this to the early broadcast of Sailor Moon (Polsat, 1995) and Korzeniowski's popularizing articles from the same period.

By the end of the 1990s, the Polish manga and anime community was estimated to consist of around 10,000 to 15,000 individuals. By the mid-2010s, this number had grown to 100,000. The number of manga publishing houses also increased (in 2019, there were seven, with over 400 titles published that year). The availability of anime titles has also improved, although many fans still consider the current situation in the Polish market unsatisfactory. In 2023, Reczulski noted that the manga and anime fandom "is currently a normal and common phenomenon in Poland and is one of the leading elements of Polish youth culture, exerting a huge influence on the language, interests, and fashion of Polish teenagers".

== Bibliography ==
- Reczulski, Łukasz (2023). Narodziny i rozkwit Polskiej Rzeczypospolitej Mangowej [The Birth and Flourishing of the Polish Manga Republic] (in Polish). Łódź: Instytut Archeologii Uniwersytetu Łódzkiego. ISBN 978-83-963463-7-7.
