= Christine Böhm =

Austrian actress

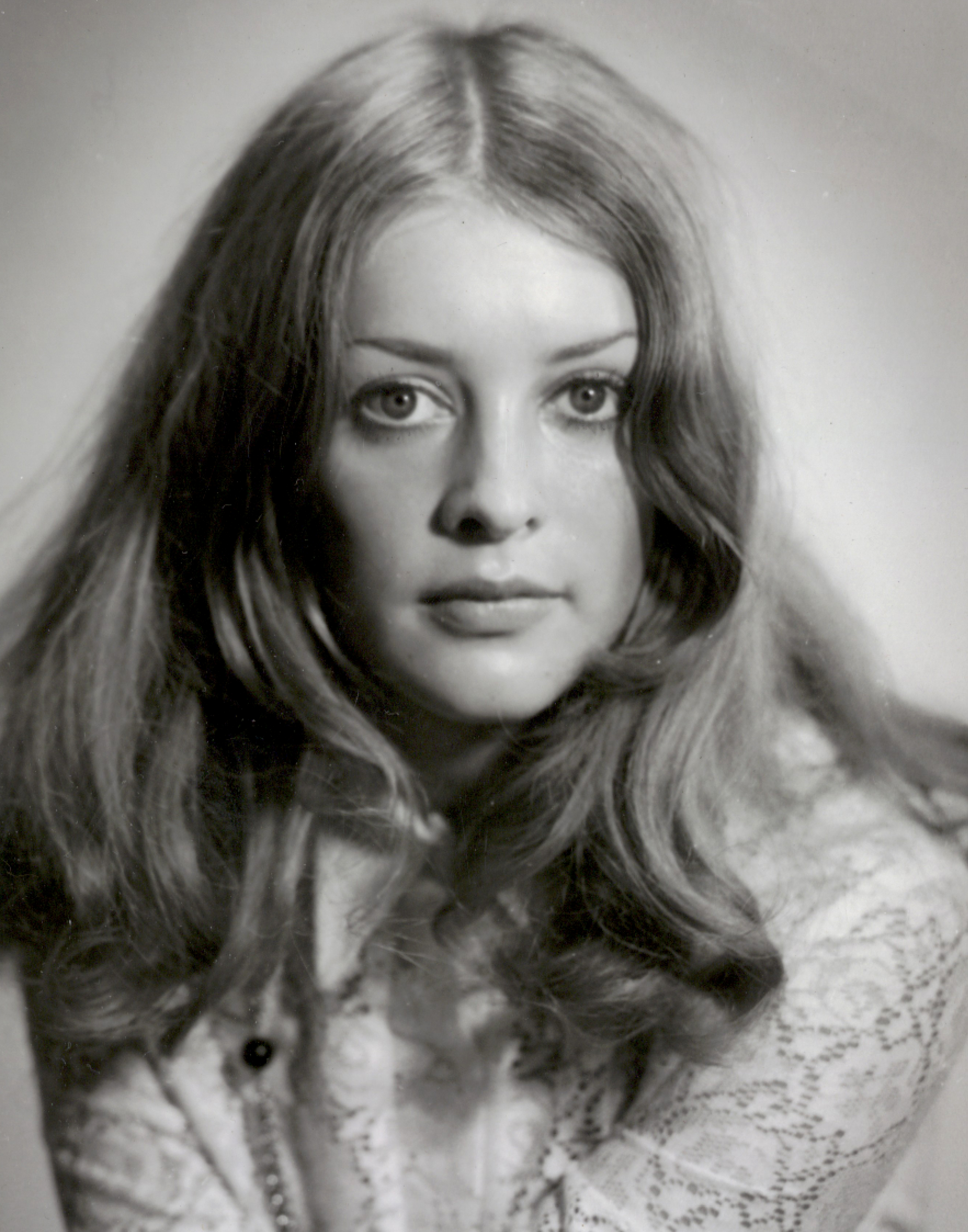
- Born: 19 February 1954; Vienna, Austria
- Died: 5 August 1979 (aged 25); Cerro di Laveno, Italy
- Occupation: actor
- Notable work: Arsène Lupin

Christine Böhm (February 19, 1954 – August 5, 1979) was an Austrian actress. She performed in many comedies and appeared on Arsen Lupin, a 1970s television series. She died in an accident at age 25.

== Biography ==
Böhm was born on February 19, 1954, in Vienna, Austria. Her father was Maxi Böhm, an Austrian performer.

She performed in comedies which were broadcast by the Austrian Television ORF and appeared on the Arsen Lupin show (primarily known as Arsène Lupin in its home French market).

On August 5, 1979, Böhm died in an accident in Cerro di Laveno, Lake Maggiore, Italy.

== Selected filmography ==
- Bloody Friday (1972)
- Stolen Heaven (1974)
- Bait (1976)
- Death or Freedom (1977)
- Lady Oscar (1979)
