= Claudine (manga) =

1978 Japanese manga series by Riyoko Ikeda

- Cover of the Japanese tankōbon release

クローディーヌ...! (Kurōdīnu...!)
- Genre: Drama, romance
- Manga
- Written by: Riyoko Ikeda
- Published by: Shueisha
- English publisher: NA: Seven Seas Entertainment
- Imprint: Margaret Comics
- Magazine: Weekly Margaret
- Original run: January 15, 1978 – January 29, 1978
- Volumes: 1

Claudine (Japanese: クローディーヌ...!, Hepburn: Kurōdīnu...!) is a Japanese shōjo manga series written and illustrated by Riyoko Ikeda. It was serialized in two issues of Shueisha's Weekly Margaret magazine in January 1978 and later published in a single tankōbon volume under the Margaret Comics imprint on May 20, 1978. Seven Seas Entertainment licensed the series for an English-language release in North America, published on June 26, 2018. Claudine is notable for being one of the earliest manga to feature a transgender protagonist.

== Plot ==
The story is narrated by an unnamed psychiatrist as he reflects on the life and loves of Claude, the child of an aristocratic French family in the early 20th century. Assigned female at birth, Claude (born and often referred to throughout the story as Claudine) has identified as a boy since the age of eight; Claude's parents take him to the psychiatrist, who befriends Claude after confirming that he is in good health.

As a teenager, Claude falls in love with Maura, a servant in his family's house. Though Maura loves him in turn, she goes back to her home after the death of her father. As a high school student, Claude falls in love with Cecilia, a librarian at his school. Cecilia does not reciprocate his feelings, and is, in fact, secretly having an affair with Claude's father, Auguste; Louis, Cecilia's brother who himself had an affair with Auguste in his youth, kills Cecilia and Auguste out of jealousy.

Later, as he works towards his master's degree, Claude falls in love with a ballet dancer name Sirène. The two begin a relationship, though Sirène eventually falls in love with and becomes engaged to one of Claude's brothers. Believing that his female body makes him an "imperfect man", and with a final appeal to Sirène having been ignored, Claude falls into despair and commits suicide. In a closing narration, the psychiatrist confides to the audience that he has "no hesitation" in his belief that Claude is transgender.

== Characters ==
Claude
The youngest child of a French aristocratic family. Beautiful, captivating, and exceptionally intelligent, Claude (born and often referred to throughout the story as Claudine) was assigned female at birth, but has lived and identified as a man since his childhood. Though his gender identity is generally accepted by his family, he faces hardship and tragedy in his romantic life.
The Doctor
The unnamed narrator of the story. A psychiatrist, he befriends Claude after his mother sends him to his office after showing signs that nowadays seem like gender dysphoria with Claude essentially coming out to her. He concludes at the end of the story that Claude is a trans man.
Auguste de Montesse
Claude's father. The patriarch of a wealthy land-owning family, he seemed to be supportive of Claude the moment he came out. He ends up raising Claude as his son, spending hours hunting and horseback riding with him.
Madame de Montesse
Claude's mother, who married Auguste in an arranged marriage. She is hesitant to accept Claude's situation, more out of naivete and lack of preparation than anything else. She is the one who contacts the Doctor to help him out.
Andrew, Edward, and Thomas
Claude's older brothers. They deeply love their younger sibling, and, except for Andrew, all support his gender identity.
Rosemarie
A childhood friend of Claude's. Though she has been in love with Claude since they were children, he does not reciprocate her feelings despite greatly caring for her otherwise. After suffering burns to her face in the fire caused by Louis, she moves to Paris to open a shop. Of all of Claude's paramours, Rosemarie is the first woman who fully understands and accepts Claude's gender identity.
Louis Laques
Rosemarie's tutor, the brother of Cecilia, and the former lover of Auguste. After Claude falls in love with Cecilia, and once Rosemarie accidentally blurts this fact out, a jealous Louis snaps and sets a massive fire that kills Auguste and Cecilia and badly burns Rosemarie. He disappears afterward.
Maura
Claude's first love interest. The daughter of former retainers of the Montesse clan, Maura was actually born on the family estate and it's said that a very young Claude held her as a newborn. Years later, she lives with her family in a nearby village and later starts working in the mansion. She has to return home after the death of her father.
Cecilia Laques
Claude's second love interest, and the sister of Louis plus the mistress of Claude's father Auguste. A librarian working at Claude's school, he pursues her romantically, though she does not return his feelings and, in her shock after Claude's confession, she rejects him and blurts out that she cannot see him as a man. A few moments later, she dies in the fire caused by Louis.
Sirène Beige
Claude's third and final love interest. After crossing paths as teenagers, they meet again as adults at a party and fall deeply in love with each other. While she does more-or-less accept Claude's gender identity, she ends up falling in love with and gets engaged to Claude's brother Andrew.

== Publication ==
Written and illustrated by Riyoko Ikeda, Claudine was serialized in Shueisha's shōjo manga magazine Weekly Margaret in 1978, with the first part published in the No. 4–5 (January 15–22) combined issue, and the second part published in the No. 6 (January 29) issue.

Shueisha collected and published the chapters in a single tankōbon volume under the Margaret Comics imprint on May 20, 1978. Fairbell Comics reprinted the volume in 2006 and released a digital version in 2013. Goma Books released a new digital version of the manga, along with ten other works by Ikeda, in 2018.

On November 15, 2017, Seven Seas Entertainment announced they licensed Claudine for an English-language release in North America. It was published in a single volume (based on the Fairbell Comics edition) on June 26, 2018. The manga is also licensed in Italy by RW Edizioni under the Goen imprint. It was published in a single volume on May 17, 2014.

No.	Original release date	Original ISBN	North American release date	North American ISBN
1	May 20, 1978	4-08-850340-6	June 26, 2018	978-1-626928-91-6

== Reception ==
Claudine received mixed reviews from English-language publications. Austin Price of Otaku USA praised Ikeda's artwork as gorgeous and baroque, singling out her "expressive character designs and cinematic panel arrangements." Amy McNulty of Anime News Network (ANN) similarly commended Ikeda's iconic style of "large, beautiful eyes and fanciful attire", as well as "the finely detailed background art ... similar to architectural drawings." The story itself was described by Amanda Pagan of the New York Public Library as a "powerful tale about identity, culture, and self-acceptance." Publishers Weekly believed the manga might be able to teach its teenage demographic "something important about believing in oneself".

Critics also praised the fact that Claudine "stars an undeniably trans character" without it being relegated to subtext or ambiguous writing. Lynzee Loveridge of ANN felt that this "forthrightness is unique for a genre that likes to stay in the 'will they or won't they' category so often." Rebecca Silverman of ANN agreed, stating that "for a manga in 1978 to tackle this subject is impressive in and of itself, because there's not a lot of authors in 2018 who are trying, much less in a thoughtful way." Echoing these sentiments, Erica Friedman, the founder of Yuricon, called the manga "an extraordinary portrayal." She added that "it reads a bit old fashioned now, as society moves towards greater awareness and understanding of transgender people, but it's not stale in the least."

However, Publishers Weekly and Silverman of ANN both cautioned that there are "some outdated terms and unfortunate attitudes" portrayed throughout the story. Most notably, characters often misgender Claude by referring to him with feminine pronouns. McNulty of ANN acknowledged that this "can be difficult to view ... through a modern lens", but argued that the misgendering "makes the manga feel more realistic, especially considering the historical setting", and that, as a result, the rejected love interest Rosemarie's casual and determined references to Claude as a man feel more powerful. Conversely, Price of Otaku USA thought the manga didn't go far enough in depicting the prejudices of the era. He noted that Claude's family and friends are exceptionally understanding of his gender identity for members of the aristocracy in the early 20th century and that Claude himself is largely undaunted by the bigotry he does encounter, "freeing the story from either external or internal conflict." Price opined that Claude's unique circumstances often "seem entirely beside the point."

The ending—in which Claude takes his own life after his relationship with Sirène falls apart—has also been criticized as "too wantonly dark." Loveridge of ANN complained that "Claudine indulges in many of the same tragic gay-panic tropes as yuri manga from that time period" where "the only possible ending to a queer romance is one of utmost tragedy." In her review for Okazu, a website dedicated to news and reviews of yuri manga and anime, Friedman similarly acknowledged a "Well of Loneliness feel about the conclusion". However, she noted that "the end of [Claude's] life is presented not as an inevitability, but a crime committed upon [Claude] by society."

Additionally, McNulty and Silverman of ANN thought the story "feels rushed confined to a single volume" and that "it doesn't have the impact of Ikeda's longer works." Price of Otaku USA agreed, stating that "there's no time for Ikeda to delve into the premise" or to "develop the historical setting and the ways it might affect the characters", given the manga's short page count. He added that "the book reads like the Cliff Notes to a more fully fleshed graphic novel that was never made."

Other critics said that the manga, which follows Claude as he "comes to terms with his gender identity and falls in love with multiple women throughout his life," is positive in that most of his family supports his identity and his demise is a "fault of society," but negative because "the title of the manga is Claude's dead name."
