= Rosalie Lamorlière =

Last servant of Marie Antoinette

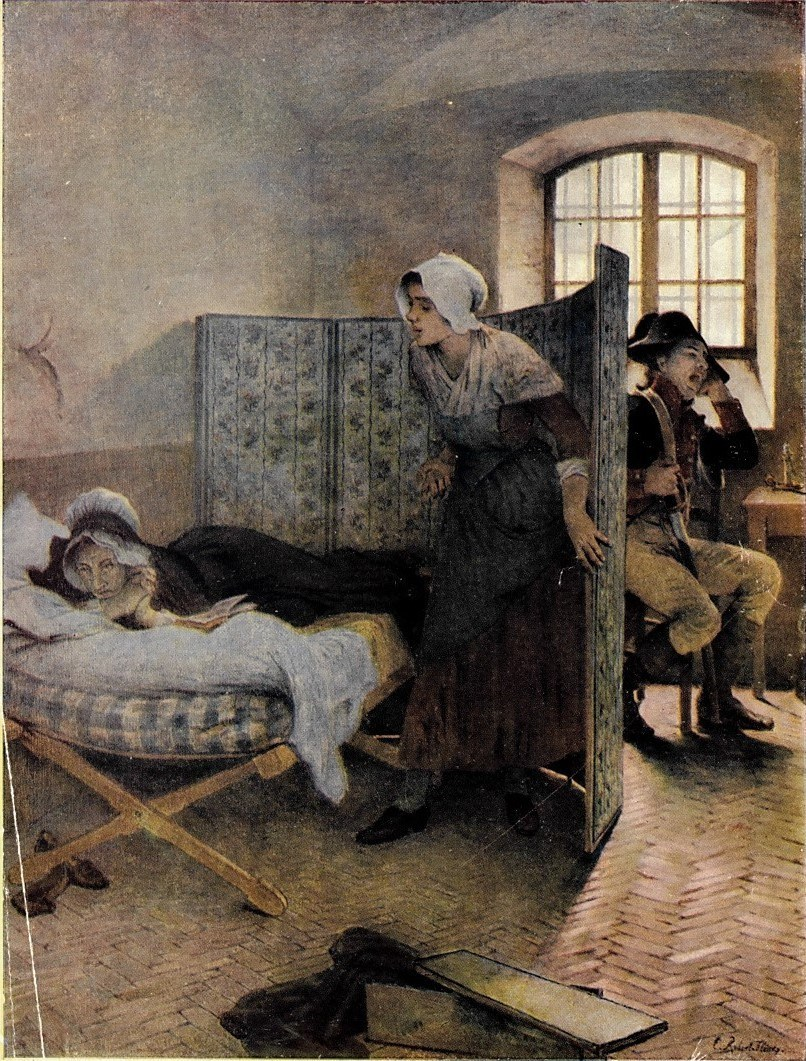
- Lamorlière depicted in Marie-Antoinette, le matin de son exécution
- Born: Marie-Rosalie Delamorlière; 19 March 1768; Breteuil, Picardie, France
- Died: 2 February 1848 (aged 79); Paris, France
- Resting place: Père Lachaise Cemetery
- Occupations: Servant at the Conciergerie; Servant to Marie Antoinette; Author
- Years active: 1792–1799

Rosalie Lamorlière (née Marie-Rosalie Delamorlière; 19 March 1768 – 2 February 1848) was a French domestic servant. She was the last servant to Marie Antoinette, while the former queen was imprisoned in the Conciergerie—awaiting her trial and execution. Rosalie had one daughter.

== Life ==
Born Marie-Rosalie Delamorlière on 19 March 1768 in Breteuil, France, to the cobbler François de Lamorlière (1738–1812) and his wife Marguerite Charlotte Vaconsin, who died when Rosalie was 12. Rosalie lived most of her life in rue de Sèvres, in Paris, with her six siblings.

In 1792, at the age of 24, Rosalie was employed as a servant at the Conciergerie. While working there, Rosalie adopted the name Rosalie Lamorlière, so as not to confuse the nobility. Shortly after her employment, Rosalie was chosen to be the main servant of Marie Antoinette, who was Queen of France until 1792. She would remain in this post until Marie Antoinette’s ultimate death on 16 October 1793. In 1799, Rosalie would retire from her job as servant.

Rosalie was still somewhat close to Marie Antoinette’s family after the former queen’s death, and in 1824, she was given an allowance by Marie Antoinette’s surviving daughter, Marie-Thérèse Charlotte.

During the 1830s, she was interviewed by a certain Lafont d'Aussonne, for whom she described the imprisonment and final days of Marie Antoinette. On the day in which Marie Antoinette was transferred to the Conciergerie, Rosalie claims:

On 2 August, during the night, when the queen arrived from the Temple, I noticed that no kind of herds or clothes had been brought with her. The next day, and every day after, this unfortunate princess asked for linen, and Madame Richard, fearing to compromise herself, did not dare to lend her or provide her with any. Finally, the municipal Michonis, who in heart was an honest man, transported himself to the Temple, and on the tenth day a package was brought from the dungeon, which the queen promptly opened. They were beautiful batiste shirts, handkerchiefs, fichus, black silk or filoselle stockings, a white underdress for the morning, a few nightcaps, and several pieces of white ribbon, of unequal widths.

It is unknown what Rosalie looked like, as the only portrait known to be painted of her has been lost. Apart from that, the only other existing painting of her is Marie-Antoinette, le matin de son exécution, painted by Tony Robert-Fleury in 1906; he had never seen Rosalie.

=== Death ===
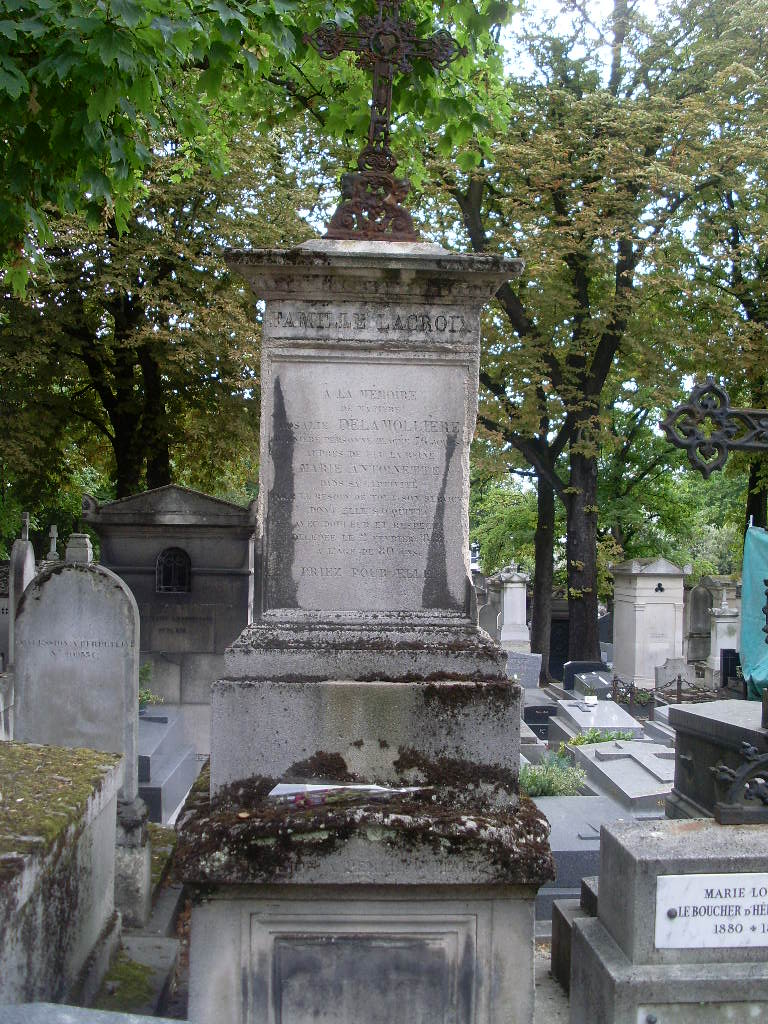
Lamorliere's family tomb in the Père Lachaise Cemetery

Rosalie died on 2 February 1848, at the age of 79. Her tomb was erected by her daughter at the Père Lachaise Cemetery in Paris.

Although she never married, she had a child named Marie Rosalie de Lamorlière (1801-1895), whose father is unknown.

== Representation in media ==
Rosalie Lamorlière, dernière servants de Marie-Antoinette was published in 2010 by Ludovic Miserole. The book details the life of Lamorlière and her correspondence with Marie Antoinette. It is only available in French.

=== Popular media ===
Riyoko Ikeda's manga Rose of Versailles features a heavily fictionalised Rosalie as one of the central viewpoint characters. She also appears in Riyoko Ikeda’s sequel to the Rose of Versailles, Eikou no Napoleon – Eroica.

Rosalie is the main character in the 2019 BBC radio play My Friend, Marie Antoinette, written by Carine Adler and starring Lily Loveless.
