= Riyoko Ikeda =

Japanese manga artist and singer (born in 1947)

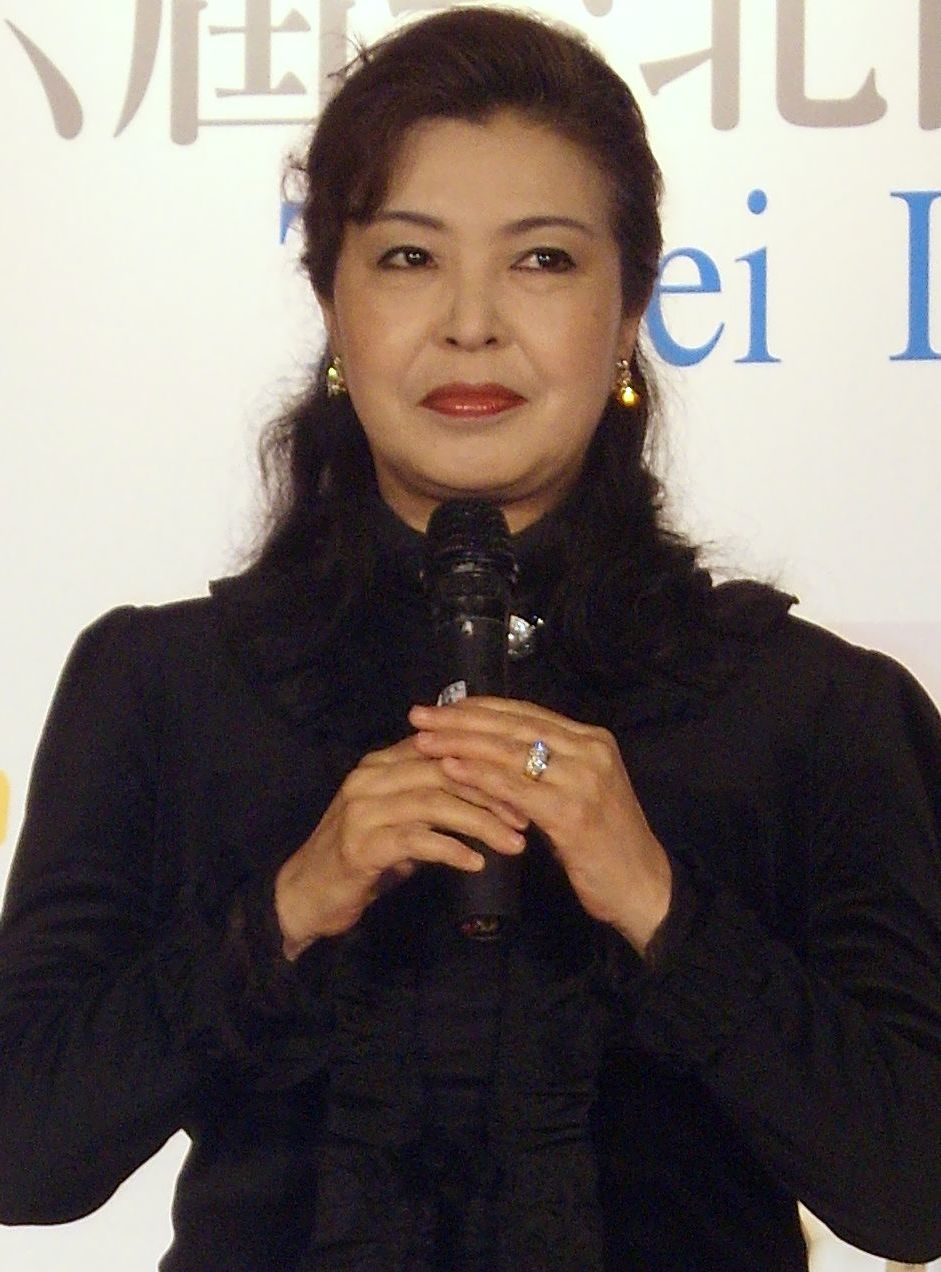
- Ikeda at 2008 Taipei International Book Exhibition
- Born: December 18, 1947 (age 78) Osaka, Japan
- Areas: Writer, Penciller, Inker
- Notable works: The Rose of Versailles; Dear Brother

Riyoko Ikeda (池田 理代子, Ikeda Riyoko; born December 18, 1947) is a Japanese manga artist and singer. She was one of the most popular manga artists in the 1970s, being best known for The Rose of Versailles.

== Early life ==
Riyoko Ikeda was born on December 18, 1947, in Osaka, Japan. She was the eldest of two brothers and one sister. Her mother was a full-time housewife, while her father worked as a manager at a bicycle factory. Prior to her birth, her father was taken as a prisoner of war during the Second World War, but survived and returned home.

As a young child, Ikeda recalled being ostracized and excluded by her peers, which she stated made her more withdrawn and intrigued with books and manga. Shortly before entering junior high, her family moved to Kashiwa following her father's job transfer. From there, she attended Tokyo Metropolitan Hakuoh High School, during which she became enamoured with Russian literature, citing a fondness for Dostoyevsky, Tolstoy and Maxim Gorky. It was also throughout this time she became deeply moved by Stefan Zweig's 1932 biography of Marie Antoinette. She recalled vowing to herself at the time to turn Antoinette's story into a work of art, and had already decided on the title The Rose of Versailles.

In a 2016 interview about the making of Dear Brother, Ikeda remarked on her school days, saying:

"I was really bad at sports, but for some reason, I was quite popular with the girls during my middle and high school years. In middle school, which was co-ed, I had good grades, had a very tanned skin, was tall, and completely lacked femininity, maybe that's why (laughs). Even in high school, younger students would write me letters. After graduating, I found out that knowing someone like 'Ikeda-san' was really a source of pride for them"

== Education ==
Ikeda was a student at the Tokyo University of Education (now known as Tsukuba University) as a philosophy major. Influenced by the Japanese New Left and student protest movements in the late 1960s, she became a member of the Democratic Youth League of Japan, the youth wing of the Japanese Communist Party. In her sixth year of college, she started serializing her most famous manga, The Rose of Versailles, and subsequently dropped out after seven years of college due to work demands from serialization.

== Career ==
Ikeda began publishing manga in the magazine Kashihonya while studying philosophy. She debuted in 1967 with Bara Yashiki no Shōjo.

Ikeda has written and illustrated many shōjo manga, many of which are based on historical events, such as the French Revolution or the Russian Revolution. Her use of foreign settings and androgynous themes made The Rose of Versailles and Orpheus no Mado enormous successes.

Her most famous manga is The Rose of Versailles, also known as Lady Oscar in Europe. This manga, loosely based on the French Revolution, has been made into several Takarazuka musicals, an anime series, and a live-action film. After Rose of Versailles concluded, Ikeda wrote articles for Asahi Shimbun. In 1985 Ikeda began studying at Tokyo College of Music at which she graduated from in 1999 and began performing as an opera singer. Her voice is in the soprano range. She made a comeback to the comic industry as a script writer in 1999. Her recent manga includes Der Ring des Nibelungen. It is a manga version of the opera written by Richard Wagner. Her series The Rose of Versailles received a movie adaptation by studio MAPPA which released in Japan in late January 2025.

In 2008, she was awarded France's National Order of the Legion of Honour for her contributions to Japan's cultural awareness of France and received the medal of Chevalier from the French ambassador to Japan. She was awarded the Japan Cartoonists Association Award of Excellence work Orpheus no Mado in 1980.

She was also a guest at the 2011 Angoulême International Comics Festival. In 2010 she attended Romics in Rome and performed with Yoshitaka Murata and Giacomo Rocchetti. Ikeda also worked as the lyricist on a three part opera by the title of Nemuru Otoko which was composed in 2021 and performed in Finland.

She is included in the Year 24 Group by some critics, journalists, and academics, although her inclusion has been debated due to a focus more on epic stories than the internal psychology of those manga artists.

== Works ==
- Bara Yashiki no Shōjo (1967) – short story
- Soyo Kaze no Mary – short story
- Francesca no Shouzou (1969)
- Sokoku ni Ai o (1969)
- Freesia no Asa (1970)
- Futari Pocchi (1971)
- Ikite te Yokatta! (1971)
- Jinchouge (1971)
- Mariko (1971)
- Sakura Kyou (1972)
- The Rose of Versailles (1972)
- Shiroi Egmont (1973)
- Yureru Soushun (1973)
- Shōko no Etude (1974)
- Dear Brother (1974)
- Orpheus no Mado (1975)
- Claudine (1978)
- Ayako (1979)
- Epitaram: A Wedding Song (1981)
- Aoi Zakuro (1982)
- Jotei Ecatherina (1982)
- Versailles no Bara Gaiden (1984) – extra chapters for The Rose of Versailles
- Eikou no Napoleon – Eroica (1986)
- Glass no Yami (1987)
- Mijo Monogatari (1988)
- Kasuganotsubon – Kefuzo Kataku o (1989)
- Ten no Hate Made – Poland Hishi (1991) – Poland's Secret Story: To the Borders of Heaven
- Shoutoku Taishi (1991)
- Fuyu no Shukusai (1997)
- Elizabeth (1999) – text only; art by Erika Miyamoto
- Niberunku no Yubiwa (2000) – Der Ring des Nibelungen
- Ikeda Riyoko the Best: Ai to Tatakau Onnatachi (2001)
- Falcon no Meikishu (2004)
- Ai wa Waltz ni Nosete (2005)
- BeruBara Kids (2006) – The Rose of Versailles Kids (parody)
- Haru no Yuki (2006) – Spring Snow
- The Legend (Taiōshijinki) (2007)
- Taketori Monogatari (2014)
