= The Rose of Versailles =

Japanese manga series by Riyoko Ikeda

- Second tankōbon volume cover, featuring Marie Antoinette (background) and Oscar François de Jarjayes (foreground)

ベルサイユのばら (Berusaiyu no Bara)
- Genre: Historical; Romance
- Manga
- Written by: Riyoko Ikeda
- Published by: Shueisha
- English publisher: NA: Udon Entertainment
- Imprint: Margaret Comics
- Magazine: Margaret
- Volumes: 14
- Series titles
- The Rose of Versailles; (May 21, 1972 – December 23, 1973, 10 volumes); The Rose of Versailles: Episodes; (April 20, 2013 – February 5, 2018, 4 volumes)
- Anime television series
- Directed by: Tadao Nagahama (1–13); Osamu Dezaki (19–40)
- Music by: Kōji Makaino
- Studio: Tokyo Movie Shinsha
- Licensed by: NA: Discotek Media (current); Nozomi Entertainment (former)
- Original network: NNS (NTV)
- Original run: October 10, 1979 – September 3, 1980
- Episodes: 40
- Other notable adaptations
- Various stage musicals (since 1974); Lady Oscar (live-action film, 1979); The Rose of Versailles: I'll Love You As Long As I Live (animated film, 1987); The Rose of Versailles (animated film, 2025)
- Sequels & spin-offs
- The Rose of Versailles: Gaiden (1984–85); Eikou no Napoleon – Eroica (1986–95); Beru Bara Kids (2005–13)

The Rose of Versailles, (Note: Japanese: ベルサイユのばら, Hepburn: Berusaiyu no Bara) also known as Lady Oscar and La Rose de Versailles, is a Japanese manga series written and illustrated by Riyoko Ikeda. It was originally serialized in Shueisha's shōjo manga magazine Margaret from 1972 to 1973, while a revival of the series was published in the magazine from 2013 to 2018. The series is a historical drama set in 18th century France before and during the French Revolution. Using a combination of historical personages and original characters, The Rose of Versailles focuses primarily on the lives of two women: the Queen of France Marie Antoinette, and Oscar François de Jarjayes, who serves as commander of the Royal Guard.

The creation of The Rose of Versailles as a story about revolution and populist uprising arose from Ikeda's involvement in the Democratic Youth League of Japan – the youth wing of the Japanese Communist Party – and from an interest in the French Revolution she developed after reading Stefan Zweig's biography of Marie Antoinette in high school. The series was developed during a significant transitional period for shōjo manga as a medium, characterized by the emergence of stories with complex narratives focused on politics and sexuality. The Rose of Versailles was a significant critical and commercial success, and by 2022 had sold over 23 million copies worldwide. The series contributed significantly to the development of shōjo manga, and was one of the primary works responsible for its shift from a genre aimed at children to a genre aimed at adolescents and young adults.

The Rose of Versailles spawned a media franchise, having been adapted into an anime television series produced by TMS Entertainment and broadcast on Nippon Television during the 1979–80 season, a 1979 live-action film directed by Jacques Demy, a series of musicals staged by the Takarazuka Revue, and a 2025 anime film produced by MAPPA. Several sequels and spin-offs have also been produced, notably Eikou no Napoleon – Eroica. The manga series was licensed for an English language release in North America by Udon Entertainment, while the anime adaptation is currently licensed in North America by Discotek Media.

== Synopsis ==
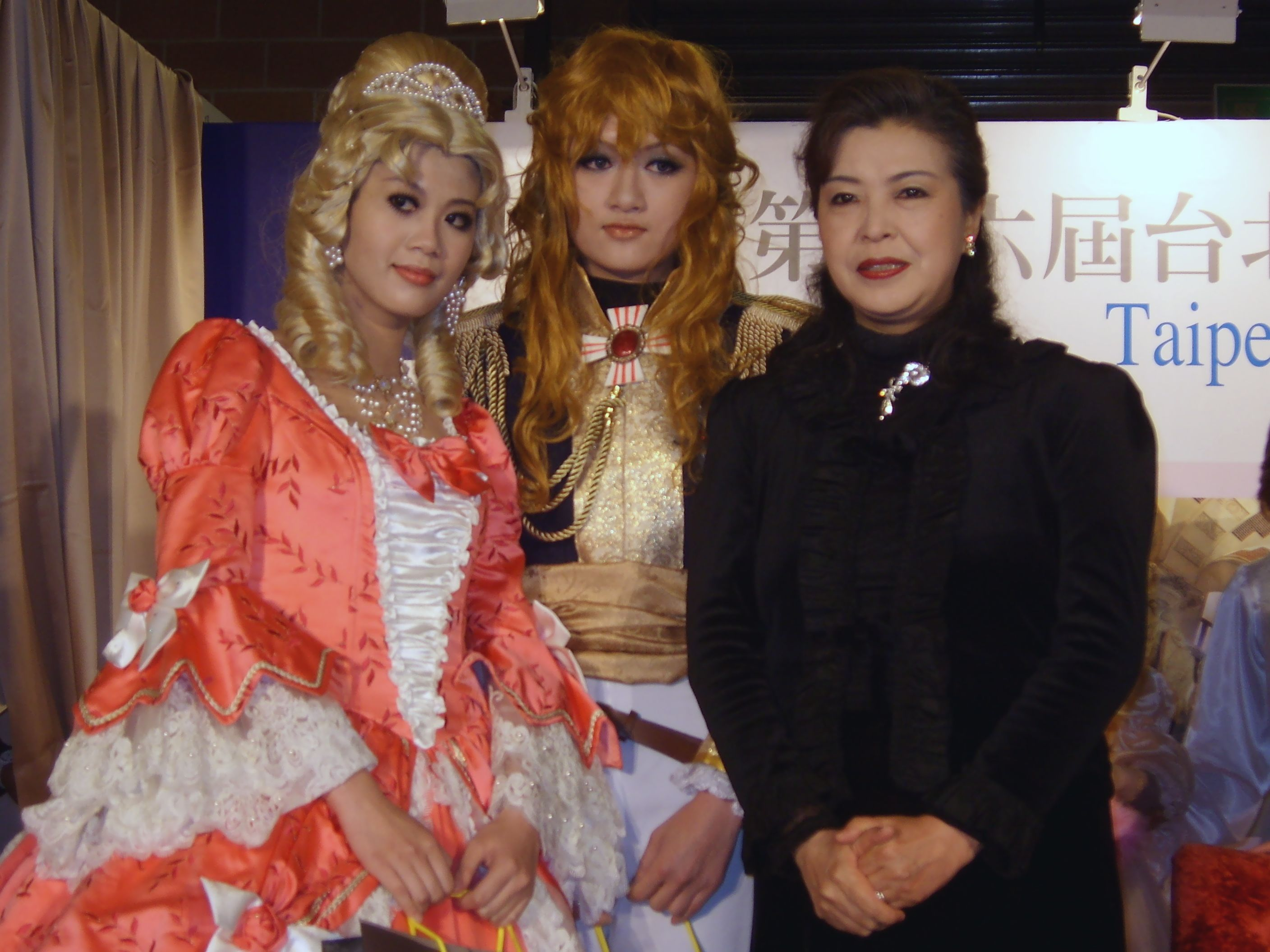
Author Riyoko Ikeda (right) with cosplayers dressed as Marie Antoinette (left) and Oscar (center) in 2008

The Rose of Versailles follows the reign of Queen of France Marie Antoinette, though the series later refocuses to Oscar François de Jarjayes, the commander of the Royal Guards at the Palace of Versailles. As the youngest of six daughters, Oscar was raised like a man from birth by her military general father to succeed him as Royal Guard commander. Oscar's commoner friend (and later lover) André Grandier, the grandson of her nanny, serves as her attendant.

In 1770, Antoinette begins an affair with the Swedish count Axel von Fersen, which becomes the subject of gossip and scandal throughout the country and damages Antoinette's reputation. After von Fersen leaves Europe to fight in the American Revolutionary War ten years later, a distraught Antoinette begins spending lavishly on jewelry and clothing to distract herself from his absence. Her spending mires the country in debt, while the 1784 Affair of the Diamond Necklace and the machinations of the scheming Duchess of Polignac further aggravate public sentiment toward the monarchy.

Oscar, meanwhile, begins to realize how France is governed and sympathizes with those living in poverty. With the impending outbreak of the French Revolution, Oscar leaves the Royal Guard to join the French Guards Regiment. André dies fighting alongside Oscar with the revolutionaries and the regiment during a skirmish with the military; Oscar herself dies the following day, leading the revolutionaries during the Storming of the Bastille. Three years later, the revolutionaries capture Antoinette and the royal family. After being tried by the Revolutionary Tribunal, Antoinette is sentenced to death by guillotine.

== Characters ==
The Rose of Versailles juxtaposes a combination of real-life historical personages and original characters created by Ikeda. The action of the story is primarily focused on Marie Antoinette and Oscar François de Jarjayes, who alternately serve as the primary character of the series, while Axel von Fersen serves as the object of affection for both women. Two additional characters, André Grandier and Rosalie Lamorliere, function within the story as audience surrogates.

== Development ==
=== Context ===
Riyoko Ikeda came of age in the 1960s, a decade that saw the rise of the New Left in Japan. This political movement, inspired in part by the ideals of the French Revolution, galvanized Japanese youth and led to the formation of student protest movements. Upon entering university in 1966, Ikeda became a part of this movement after joining the Democratic Youth League of Japan, the youth branch of the Japanese Communist Party. Ikeda made her debut as a manga artist in 1967, with her early works generally falling into one of two categories: romantic stories typical of shōjo manga of the era, and socially and politically motivated stories that addressed themes such as poverty, diseases caused by nuclear weapons, and discrimination against Japan's burakumin population.

Shōjo manga (girls' manga) of the 1960s largely consisted of simple stories marketed towards elementary school-aged girls, with discussions of topics such as politics and sexuality considered taboo. These attitudes began to shift in the 1970s, as new authors began to move shōjo manga away from an audience of children towards an audience of adolescents and young women. This shift came to be embodied by a new generation of shōjo manga artists collectively referred to as the Year 24 Group, of which Ikeda has been associated; the group was so named because its members were born in or around year 24 of the Shōwa era (or 1949 in the Gregorian calendar). The group contributed significantly to the development of shōjo manga by expanding the genre to incorporate elements of science fiction, historical fiction, adventure fiction, and same-sex romance: both male-male (yaoi) and female-female (yuri).

=== Production and release ===
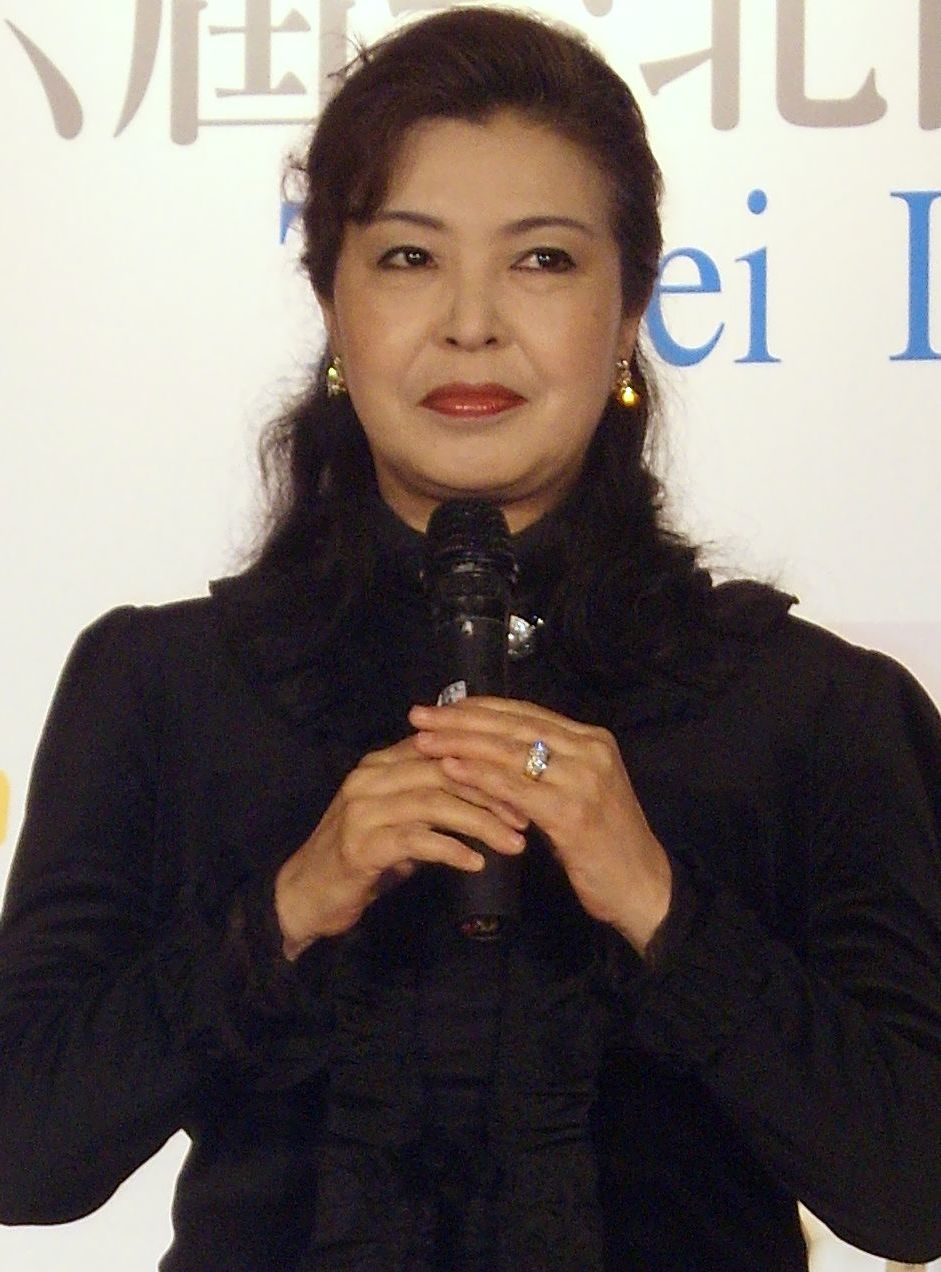
Ikeda in 2008

As the New Left declined in the early 1970s, Ikeda decided to create a manga focused on themes of revolution and populist uprising. After researching the French Revolution for two years, Ikeda proposed a manga series that would be a biography of Marie Antoinette to her editors at the Japanese publishing company Shueisha. Though Ikeda's editors were reticent about the concept, the first chapter of The Rose of Versailles was published on May 21, 1972, in the weekly shōjo manga magazine Margaret. As a result of this lack of support from her editors, Ikeda was dependent on fan feedback to ensure the continued publication of her story; for example, Rosalie was initially conceived by Ikeda as an audience surrogate character, she was unpopular with some readers and Ikeda tried to incorporate those fan's feelings into the character Caroline, who appears in the spin off.

Ikeda modeled her depiction of Antoinette on typical shōjo heroines of the era: lively, sentimental, and seeking love, with her rivalry with Madame du Barry mirroring shōjo stories that focus on rivalries between schoolgirls. The exotic Western setting marked by a rococo style was also similarly aligned with typical shōjo manga settings of the 1970s. Oscar is initially introduced as a supporting character, with Ikeda's decision to make the commander of the Royal Guard a woman rooted in her belief that she could not convincingly write a character who was a male soldier. Ikeda based the character's appearance on Swedish actor Björn Andrésen, who became immensely popular in Japan in the early 1970s after starring in the film Death in Venice. Oscar became immediately popular, with her characterization as a strong and charismatic woman resonating with the shōjo audience; in response to positive feedback from readers, Oscar shifted to become the primary protagonist of the series as it progresses.

As the series shifted to focus on Oscar, Ikeda pursued a more serious tone relative to early chapters of The Rose of Versailles in terms of her depiction of politics, social issues, and sexuality; the art style also shifts, both to reflect this tonal change and to depict how the characters have aged. Following Oscar and André's deaths, readership of The Rose of Versailles declined precipitously; the November 4, 1973, issue of Margaret, published two weeks after Oscar's death, contains a note from the editors indicating that they had been inundated with letters from readers asking for Oscar and André be brought back to life. Though Ikeda wished to continue the series and depict the entirety of the French Revolution, her editors convinced her to conclude the series shortly thereafter. The final chapters of the series shift back to Antoinette as the primary character, and depict the events of the revolution from the fall of the Bastille to Antoinette's death.

=== Revival ===
In 2013, Shueisha invited Ikeda to write a column in Margaret to mark the 50th anniversary of the magazine. Ikeda asked if she could instead write additional chapters of The Rose of Versailles that she was unable to publish due to the series' shortened serialization; her request was accepted, and additional chapters of The Rose of Versailles began serialization in Margaret on April 20, 2013. The first chapter, which focuses on André's childhood, adapts a story that Ikeda had written for a musical adaptation of The Rose of Versailles staged by the Takarazuka Revue. The final chapter of the revival was published on February 5, 2018, and connects the story of The Rose of Versailles to the manga series The Poe Clan by Moto Hagio; Ikeda is a friend of Hagio's and a fan of The Poe Clan, and received Hagio's permission to connect the two stories.

=== English-language release ===
Writer and translator Frederik L. Schodt translated The Rose of Versailles into English for use as reference by the producers of the manga's 1979 live-action film adaptation Lady Oscar; only one copy of the translation was produced, which was lost. In 1981, Schodt again translated the first two volumes of The Rose of Versailles into English for the Japanese publishing house Sanyusha, which were published as instructional materials for Japanese readers seeking to learn English. An excerpt from Schodt's translation was included in his 1983 book Manga! Manga! The World of Japanese Comics.

In July 2015, Udon Entertainment announced that it had acquired English-language publishing rights for The Rose of Versailles. Originally scheduled for release in 2016, the first volume in the five-volume hardcover series was released in January 2020, while the final volume was released in April 2021.

== Themes and analysis ==
=== Sexuality ===
Shōjo manga of the 1960s and earlier generally depicted one of two kinds of love stories: heterosexual romances between a passive girl and a Prince Charming-like male, and Class S stories that depicted intense but fleeting homoerotic romantic friendships between girls. Rosalie is reminiscent of Class S dynamics: the young and naïve Rosalie pines for the older and mature Oscar, though Oscar rebuffs her advances on the grounds that they are both women. Her subsequent romantic interests are two Prince Charming figures: von Fersen, who rejects Oscar because he perceives her only as a man, and The Count of Girodelle, Oscar's arranged fiancé whom she rejects because he treats her only as a woman.

Oscar ultimately enters a relationship with André, who Ikeda did not initially conceive as a potential romantic partner for Oscar; his status as Oscar's true and final love was incorporated into the story on the basis of reader feedback. Manga scholar Deborah Shamoon notes that while Oscar and André's relationship is "in a biological sense heterosexual, it is still configured within the story as homogender": Oscar is a masculine woman, while André is an emasculated man. Shamoon notes that André is of lower social status relative to Oscar, that it is André and not Oscar who experiences "the stereotypically female pain of unrequited love", and that the close physical resemblance between Oscar and André echoes the aesthetics of the then-emerging boys' love (male-male romance) genre.

=== Historicity ===
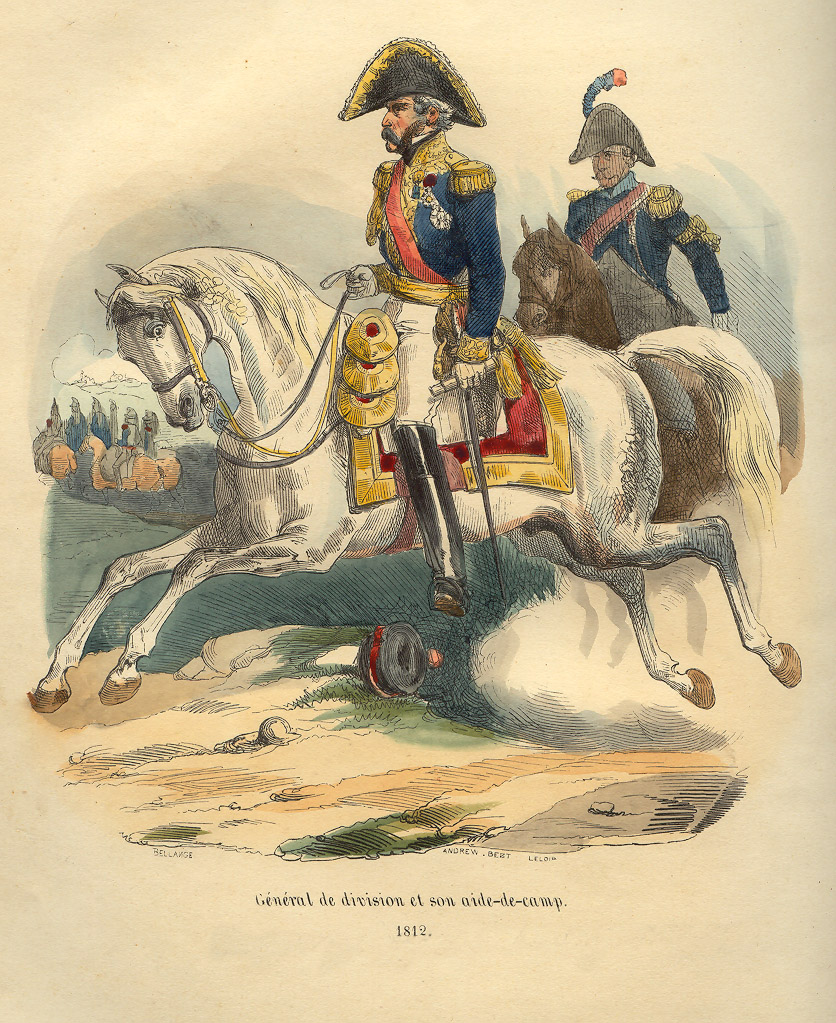
The uniform worn by the Royal Guard during the Napoleonic era as depicted in an 1843 painting by Hippolyte Bellangé is similar to the uniform worn by Oscar.

Ikeda derived the historical elements of The Rose of Versailles from the 1932 biography Marie Antoinette: The Portrait of an Average Woman by Stefan Zweig. The depiction of Marie Antoinette in The Rose of Versailles is largely rendered as it is narrated in the biography: her close relationship with her mother Maria Theresa, her loveless marriage with Louis XVI, her rivalry with Madame du Barry, her friendship with the Duchess of Polignac, the Affair of the Diamond Necklace, and her love for Axel von Fersen. Both Zweig and Ikeda portray Antoinette as a relatively unremarkable person who had an "accidental encounter with fate", contrasting both the villainous portrayals of Antoinette by the sans-culottes and the saintly depictions of Antoinette by pre-revolutionary Bourbons.

The largest deviations from historical events come in the form of Ikeda's original characters: Oscar, André, and the Jarjayes family are original creations of the author, though Oscar's father is loosely based on the real-life historical figure François Augustin Regnier de Jarjayes. The familial connection between Rosalie, Jeanne de Valois-Saint-Rémy, and the Duchess of Polignac is similarly an invention of the author, as are several supporting characters, such as Alain de Soissons. The chronology of certain historical events are also slightly altered for dramatic purposes (for example, von Fersen is not present during the Affair of the Diamond Necklace in the manga), and the manga contains some visual inaccuracies (for example, Oscar's French Guard uniform is actually the uniform worn by the Royal Guard during the Napoleonic era in the early 19th century).

Ikeda's depiction of the events of the French Revolution are informed by both her feminist and communist political leanings, and are personified in the story by Oscar. The narrative of The Rose of Versailles dramatizes the social realist doctrine advocated by the Japanese communist movement, addressing issues such as class consciousness, inequality between economic classes, the subordinate status of women, the duties of citizens, the material conditions of labor, and the manner in which rights for citizens arise from a mass and spontaneous revolt.

=== Feminism and gender ===
The feminist movement of post-war Japan was divided between consumerism, which advocated for the individualist pursuit of personal pleasure, and socialism (as embodied by the New Left), which rejected consumerism and sought a collectivist response to the subordinate status of women. Following the Asama-Sansō incident of February 1972, in which fourteen members of the United Red Army were killed in a purge, an increasing proportion of Japanese feminists rejected socialism in favor of consumerism. According to Nobuko Anan, a scholar of Japanese visual arts and gender, The Rose of Versailles embodies the tension between consumerism and socialism as a work of mass consumerist culture that nonetheless depicts what Ikeda describes as "the inner revolution of the Japanese women".

Ikeda has stated that she saw Marie Antoinette as a compelling figure in the way that she symbolized insubordination against the patriarchy, specifically her reluctance to accept the social impositions of Versailles, her loveless marriage, and the hatred that she aroused from both the court and public. However, Antoinette is limited in her ability to resist patriarchal forces by the imposition of motherhood; indeed, the abolition of the social obligation to become a mother was one of the main demands of the Japanese feminist movement at the time.

Deborah Shamoon argues that Oscar's popularity relative to Antoinette can be owed to her more complex characterization: first, that she is torn between her affection for Antoinette and the realization that she perpetuates a corrupt system; and second, that she "questions the assumptions of heterosexual romance and gender roles" through her androgyny and her search for an equal romantic partner who respects both her femininity and her masculinity. In this regard, the sex scene between Oscar and André is particularly notable: their relationship is egalitarian, both possess an androgynous appearance, and Oscar's breasts are not visible. Academic Yukari Fujimoto argues that the scene's depiction of a highly aestheticized version of sex "determined the image of sex in the minds of middle and high school female students around the time [...] not as a daily activity but as the ultimate way to convey once-in-lifetime love."

== Adaptations ==
=== Anime ===
==== Animated series ====
An anime television adaptation of The Rose of Versailles, produced by TMS Entertainment, aired on Nippon Television from October 10, 1979, to September 3, 1980. The first 12 were directed by Tadao Nagahama, while the rest of the series was directed by Osamu Dezaki. Other members of the production team included Shingo Araki as animation director and character designer, Michi Himeno as character designer, and Kōji Makaino as music composer. The series' theme song "Bara Wa Utsukushiku Chiru" ("Roses Scatter Beautifully") was composed by Makaino, written by Michio Yamagami, and performed by Hiroko Suzuki. A single episode summarizing the events of the 1979 series, The Rose and Women of Versailles (ベルサイユのばらと女たち, Berusaiyu no Bara to On'na-tachi), was also produced.

In North America, distribution rights for the anime adaptation of The Rose of Versailles were acquired by Right Stuf in 2012; the company released the series under its Nozomi Entertainment brand on DVD and on the streaming platform Viki in 2013. Rights for the series were later acquired by Discotek Media, which released the series on Blu-ray in 2021. In April 2025, TMS Entertainment began streaming the series on their official YouTube channel, with both English and Spanish subtitles.

==== Animated films ====
The Rose of Versailles: I'll Love You As Long As I Live (ベルサイユのばら 生命あるかぎり愛して, Berusaiyu no Bara: Inochi aru kagiri Aishite), an anime film adaptation of the 1979 series, was released on as an original video animation on May 21, 1987. In 2007, Toei Animation announced that it would produce a new Rose of Versailles animated film, but no film was ever produced.

A new anime film adaptation of The Rose of Versailles was announced to mark the 50th anniversary of the release of the manga series on September 6, 2022, and was released in theaters in Japan on January 31, 2025. The film is produced by MAPPA and directed by Ai Yoshimura, with Tomoko Konparu writing the script, Mariko Oka designing the characters, and Hiroyuki Sawano and Kohta Yamamoto composing the music. It stars Miyuki Sawashiro as Oscar, Aya Hirano as Marie Antoinette, Toshiyuki Toyonaga as André, and Kazuki Kato as von Fersen. The theme song for the film, "Versailles", is performed by Ayaka. Netflix released the film on April 30, 2025.

=== Musicals ===
The all-female theater revue the Takarazuka Revue has dramatized The Rose of Versailles multiple times since 1974. The show's role in Takarazuka history is particularly notable, as it triggered a significant surge in the revue's popularity and established its "Top Star" system of assigning lead roles. From 1974 to 1976, all four Takarazuka troupes staged The Rose of Versailles, drawing a total audience of 1.6 million; the revue's 1986 production alone drew an audience of 2.1 million. In 2024, a Korean adaption debuted at the Chungmu Art Center, Seoul.

=== Live-action film ===
Lady Oscar, a live-action film adaptation of The Rose of Versailles, was released in Japan on March 3, 1979. The film was directed by Jacques Demy, and stars Catriona MacColl as Oscar and Barry Stokes as André.

=== Other ===
The cosmetics brand Creer Beaute (a subsidiary of Bandai) produces a line of Rose of Versailles-branded cosmetic products. In 2014, an official Flash animation parody of The Rose of Versailles produced by the artist Frogman was released. In 2017, video game developer Otomate announced Berubara Private Academy: Rose of Versailles Re*imagination, a visual novel inspired by The Rose of Versailles, which was released in 2019.

== Reception and legacy ==
=== Critical reception ===
Manga critic Jason Thompson has praised The Rose of Versailles as "a classic" of the medium, describing Ikeda's creation of Oscar as a "stroke of genius" and foundational to manga archetype of "a woman who plays the role of a man, sometimes struggling with the burden, but mostly surpassing men at their own game". Thompson notes that while this archetype was established in Osamu Tezuka's manga series Princess Knight, he favorably compares the "elegant and tragic" Oscar to Tezuka's "childlike and cute" series. Reviewing the first two English-language volumes of The Rose of Versailles for Otaku USA, Danica Davidson similarly praises The Rose of Versailles as a series that "helped revolutionize shōjo manga", drawing specific attention its "elegant, detailed and Rococo-infused" artwork.

Reviewing the anime adaptation of The Rose of Versailles for IndieWire, Charles Solomon noted that while the series "makes American daytime soap operas feel restrained", he cites it as "an intriguing example of cross-cultural cross-pollination". He notes that while that the "Versailles of the story is no more French than the town of Titipu in Gilbert and Sullivan's The Mikado is Japanese", he praises the manner in which an "occidental setting [is] treated as an exotic backdrop for a Japanese romantic fantasy, paralleling the way Western works of fiction have treated Japan". Jennifer Berman of THEM Anime gave the adaptation five out of five stars, praising its historical fiction elements but noting that its 1970s-style animation defined by "pointy chins" and "big sparkly eyes" may be unappealing to contemporary viewers.

=== Impact ===
The Rose of Versailles was a significant commercial success upon its release. The social phenomenon of its popularity among Japanese audiences in the early 1970s is referred to as the "beru bara boom" (ベルバラブーム, berubara būmu; as derived from the original Japanese title Berusaiyu no Bara). By 2022, collected volumes of The Rose of Versailles had sold over 23 million copies worldwide. Manga artist Moto Hagio notes that the commercial success of The Rose of Versailles influenced Japanese manga publishers to routinely publish serialized manga in the tankōbon format. The series is credited with contributing to Japanese interest in French culture and popularizing the Palace of Versailles as a destination for Japanese tourists; its impact in promoting French history and culture was such that Ikeda was awarded the Legion of Honour by the French government in 2009.

The series contributed significantly to the development of shōjo manga as a medium. Susan J. Napier notes that Oscar's characterization as a "complex and three-dimensional" female character who contrasted the "traditional demure and subdued idea of Japanese womanhood" heavily influenced how female characters were portrayed in shōjo media subsequent to The Rose of Versailles' release. Oscar inspired multiple other "feisty cross-dressing heroines" in manga and anime, in series such as Hayate × Blade and Revolutionary Girl Utena. The series was additionally one of the primary works responsible for shōjo manga's shift from a genre aimed at children to a genre aimed at adolescents. This shift is reflected directly in the plot of the story itself, which progresses from a frivolous and light-hearted tone to a serious tone focused on political and social issues. Notably, the often brutal and violent deaths of the series' characters are permanent; this was a new paradigm in shōjo manga at the time, where it was common to bring deceased characters back to life using plot contrivances.

The success and notability of The Rose of Versailles has been sustained in the decades subsequent to the release of the manga through its various adaptations, notably the Takarazuka Revue musical adaptations. The musicals have been credited with popularizing Ikeda and The Rose of Versailles in Japan among the general public; by 2014, Takarazuka musical adaptations of The Rose of Versailles have been performed roughly 2,100 times to an estimated audience of over 5 million.

=== Sequels and spin-offs ===
Following the conclusion of The Rose of Versailles, Ikeda produced the following works:

- The spin-off manga series The Rose of Versailles: Gaiden (ベルサイユのばら 外伝, Berusaiyu no Bara Gaiden). It focuses on characters from the original series in stories unrelated to the events of the French Revolution, and introduces Oscar's niece Loulou de la Laurencie. It was serialized in Margaret from 1984 to 1985.
- The sequel manga series Eikou no Napoleon – Eroica. The series focuses on the First French Empire under the reign of Napoleon Bonaparte and features several characters from The Rose of Versailles in supporting roles, notably Rosalie, Bernard and Alain de Soissons. It was serialized in Margaret from 1986 to 1995.
- The parody manga series Beru Bara Kids (ベルばらKids). It was serialized as a series of four-panel yonkoma comics in the newspaper The Asahi Shimbun from 2005 to 2013.
