= List of musicals by composer: M to Z =

This is a general list of composers who have written music for the musical theatre along with their works organized by first production date. This list primarily contains musicals, but also includes links to film adaptations.

For composers whose names fall into the A-L alphabetic range, see List of musicals by composer: A to L.

== M ==
- Tony Macaulay (born 1944)

Windy City (1982)

- Galt MacDermot (1928–2018)

My Fur Lady (1957)
Hair (1967); also a 1979 film
Isabel's a Jezebel (1970)
Two Gentlemen of Verona (1971)
Dude (1972)
Via Galactica (1972)
The Karl Marx Play (1973)
It's Me Sylvia (1981)
The Human Comedy (1983)
The Legend of Joan of Arc (1997)

- Gunnar Madsen

The Shaggs: Philosophy of the World (2011)

- Rusty Magee (1955–2003)

Scapin (1993)
The Czar of Rock and Roll
The Green Heart (1997)

- Eaton "Bob" Magoon, Jr. (1922–2018)

13 Daughters (1961)
Heathen! (1972); also known as Aloha
A Little Life Like This (1992)

- Dave Malloy (born 1976)

Natasha, Pierre & The Great Comet of 1812 (2012)

- Chuck Malone

Bucket of Blood (2009)

- The Mamas & the Papas

Dream a Little Dream: The Mamas and Papas Musical (2003)

- Melissa Manchester (born 1951)

I Sent a Letter to My Love (1995)

- Henry Mancini (1924–1994)

Victor/Victoria (1995); music also by Frank Wildhorn; also a 1982 film

- Julie Mandel

Two (1978)

- Mel Mandel

My Old Friends (1979); music also by Norman Sachs

- Charles Mandracchia

Valentino: The Musical (1998)

- Harry Manfredini (born 1943)

Play Me a Country Song (1982); music also by John R. Briggs

- Barry Manilow (born 1943)

Copacabana (1985)

- Samuel L. Manning (1899–1960)

Caribbean Carnival (1947); music also by Adolph Thenstead

- Marcus Manske

Pascal – Ein Musikalisches Märchen, music also by Ulrich Hinterberg

- Steven Margoshes

Fame: The Musical (1989)

- Zane Mark

Bring in 'Da Noise, Bring in 'Da Funk (1995); music also by Ann Duquesnay, Daryl Waters
Harlem Song (2002); music also by Daryl Waters
Imagine Tap! (2006)

- Denis Markell

A Backer's Audition (1992); music also by Douglas Bernstein

- Gerald Jay Markoe (1941–2009)

Charlotte Sweet (1982)

- Gerald Marks (1900–1997)

Hold It! (1948)

- Walter Marks (born 1934)

Bajour (1964)
Go Fly a Kite (1966)
Golden Rainbow (1968)
Broadway Follies (1981)
Body Shop (1994)

- Stephen Markwick

The Secret Garden (1987)

- Bob Marley (1945–1981)

One Love: The Bob Marley Musical (2015)

- Howard Marren

Love (1984)
What About Luv? (1991)

- Queen Esther Marrow (born 1941)

Truly Blessed (1990)

- Sergio García Marruz

The English Only Restaurant (1990); music also by Saul Spangenberg

- Henry Marsh (born 1948)

Casper (1999); music also by Phil Pickett

- Tom Martel

Hard Job Being God (1972)

- Dan Martin

Breathe (1999)

- David Martin

Simply Heavenly (1957)

- Hugh Martin (1914–2011)

Best Foot Forward (1941); music also by Ralph Blane; also a 1943 film
Look, Ma, I'm Dancin'! (1948)
Make a Wish (1951)
Love from Judy (1952)
High Spirits (1964); music also by Timothy Gray
Meet Me in St. Louis (1989); music also by Ralph Blane; also a 1944 film

- Margaret Martin

Gone with the Wind (2008)

- Norman Martin

From A to Z (1960); music also by others
Put It in Writing (1963); music also by others

- Steve Martin (born 1945)

Bright Star (2014); music also by Edie Brickell

- Vinnie Martucci

Clue: The Musical (1997); music also by Galen Blum, Wayne Barker

- Mel Marvin (born 1941)

Green Pond (1977)
A History of the American Film (1978)
Constance and the Musician (1981)
The Portable Pioneer and Prairie Show (1997)
Dr. Seuss' How the Grinch Stole Christmas! (1998); music also by Albert Hague
True History and Real Adventures (1999)

- Jeff Marx (born 1970)

Avenue Q (2003); music also by Robert Lopez

- Hugh Masekela (1939–2018)

Sarafina! (1987); additional songs by Mbongeni Ngema

- William Mathieu (born 1937)

From the Second City (1961)

- Todd Matshikiza (1921–1968)

King Kong (1959)

- Griffin Matthews (born 1981)

Witness Uganda (2014); music also by Matt Gould

- Simon May (born 1944)

Smike (1973); music also by Roger Holman

- William May

Always (1997); music also by Jason Sprague

- Shane McAnally (born 1974)

Shucked (2022); music also by Brandy Clark

- Amanda McBroom (born 1947)

Heartbeats (1989); music by Gerald Sternbach, Michele Brourman, Tom Snow

- Paul McCartney (born 1942)

Beatlemania (1977); music also by John Lennon
Norwegian Wood (1988); music also by John Lennon

- Ian McCluskey

Tony! The Blair Musical (2007)

- Rob McCulloch

Attorney for the Damned (2008)

- Hugh McDonald

Cambridge Circus (1963); music also by Bill Oddie, David Palmer

- James McDonald

Something's Afoot (1976); music also by David Vos, Robert Gerlach

- James McDowell

The Wind and the Willows (1997)

- Jack McElwaine

Der Ring Gott Farblonjet (1977)

- Ian McFarlane

Betwixt! (2008)

- Ronnie McGhee

Monkey Business (2009)

- Christopher McGovern

Lizzie Borden (1998)

- Jimmy McHugh (1894–1969)

Blackbirds of 1928 (1928)
Hello, Daddy (1928)
International Revue (1930)
The Vanderbilt Revue (1930); music also by others
The Streets of Paris (1939)
Keep Off the Grass (1940)
As the Girls Go (1948)
Sugar Babies (1979); music also by others
Lucky in the Rain (1997)

- Branice McKenzie

Shades of Harlem (1983); music also by Frank Owens, Ty Stephens, Jeree Wade

- Paul McKibbin

The It Girl (2001)

- Barri McPherson

Brooklyn (2004); music also by Mark Schoenfeld

- Mitch McVicker

Canticle of the Plains (1997); music also by Rich Mullins, Beaker

- Adam Meggido (born 1970)

Saucy Jack and the Space Vixens (1998); music also by Robin Forrest, Jonathan Croose

- James J. Mellon

An Unfinished Song (1991)

- Peter Melnick (born 1958)

Adrift in Macao (2005)
The Last Smoker in America (2010)

- Ronald Melrose

Fourtune (1980)

- Alan Menken (born 1949)

God Bless You, Mr. Rosewater (1979)
Little Shop of Horrors (1982)
Weird Romance (1992)
Beauty and the Beast (1993)
A Christmas Carol (1994); also a 2004 television film
Hundreds of Hats (1995); music also by Marvin Hamlisch, Jonathan Sheffer
King David (1997)
Der Glöckner von Notre Dame (1999); German musical based on the 1996 Disney film The Hunchback of Notre Dame
Sister Act (2006)
The Little Mermaid (2007)
Leap of Faith (2010)
Aladdin (2011); also a 1992 animated film
Newsies (2011); also a 1992 film
The Apprenticeship of Duddy Kravitz (2015)
A Bronx Tale (2016)
Hercules (2019); also a 1997 animated film

- Gian Carlo Menotti (1911–2007)

Maria Golovin (1958)

- Dale Menten

The House of Leather (1970)

- Johnny Mercer (1909–1976)

Top Banana (1951)

- Sandi Merle

3 From Brooklyn (1992); music also by Steve Michaels

- Bob Merrill (1921–1998)

New Girl in Town (1957)
Take Me Along (1959)
Carnival! (1961)
Breakfast at Tiffany's (1966)
Henry, Sweet Henry (1967)
Hannah... 1939 (1990)

- Stephin Merritt (born 1966)

Coraline (2009)

- Daniel Messé (born 1968)

Amélie (2015)

- Dede Meyer

She Shall Have Music (1959)

- Joseph Meyer (1894–1987)

Big Boy (1925); music also by James F. Hanley
Sweetheart Time (1926); music also by Walter Donaldson
Just Fancy (1927); music also by Philip Charig
Here's Howe (1928); music also by Roger Wolfe Kahn
That's a Good Girl (1928); music also by Philip Charig
Lady Fingers (1929)
Jonica (1930)
Shuffle Along of 1952 (1952); music also by Eubie Blake

- Jan Meyerowitz (1913–1998)

The Barrier (1950)

- Richard Meyers

Americana (1932); music also by Jay Gorney, Harold Arlen, Herman Hupfeld

- Sylvain Meyniac

La belle et la bête (1999)

- Chip Meyreilles

Stars in Your Eyes (1999)

- Steve Michaels

3 From Brooklyn (1992); music also by Sandi Merle

- Brendan Milburn

Striking 12 (2006); music also by Gene Lewin, Valerie Vigoda

- Charles Miller

When Midnight Strikes (2007)

- Chris Miller

The Burnt Part Boys (2009)
Tuck Everlasting (2015)

- Helen Miller (1925–2006)

Inner City (1971)

- Roger Miller (1936–1992)

Big River (1985)

- Peter Mills

The Pursuit of Persephone (2005)
Golden Boy of the Blue Ridge (2009)

- Mark Milner

Tinseltown (1981)

- Tim Minchin (born 1975)

Matilda (2010)
Groundhog Day (2015)

- Lin-Manuel Miranda (born 1980)

In the Heights (2007)
Bring It On (2011); music also by Tom Kitt
Hamilton (2015)

- Cass Morgan

Pump Boys and Dinettes (1981); music also by others

- Lionel Monckton (1861–1924)

A Greek Slave (1898); music also by Sidney Jones
A Runaway Girl (1898); music also by Ivan Caryll
San Toy (1899); music also by Sidney Jones
A Country Girl (1902); music also by Paul Rubens
The Cingalee (1904); music also by Paul Rubens
The Arcadians (1909); music also by Howard Talbot
Our Miss Gibbs (1909); music also by Ivan Caryll
The Quaker Girl (1910)
The Mousmé (1911); music also by Howard Talbot
The Boy (1917); music also by Howard Talbot

- Debra Monk (born 1949)

Pump Boys and Dinettes (1981); music also by others
Oil City Symphony (1986); music also by Mike Craver, Mark Hardwick, Mary Murfitt

- Marguerite Monnot (1903–1961)

Irma La Douce (1956)

- Andy Monroe

The Kid (2010)

- Bruce Montgomery (1927–2008)

The Amorous Flea (1964)

- Dudley Moore (1935–2002)

Beyond the Fringe (1960)
Behind the Fridge (1972)

- Jerome Moross (1913–1983)

Parade (1935)
Ballet Ballades (1948)
The Golden Apple (1954)

- John Morris (1926–2018)

A Time for Singing (1966)

- Melissa Morris

Evil Dead: The Musical (2006); music also by Christopher Bond, Frank Cipolla, George Reinblatt

- Robert Morris

White Noise: A Cautionary Musical (2011); music also by Steven Morris, Joe Shane

- Steven Morris

White Noise: A Cautionary Musical (2011); music also by Robert Morris, Joe Shane

- Greg Morrison (born 1965)

The Drowsy Chaperone (2006); music also by Lisa Lambert

- Woolson Morse (1858–1897)

School, or The Charity Pupil (1880)
Cinderella at School (1881)
Madame Piper (1884)
The Merry Monarch (1890)
Wang (1891)
Panjandrum (1893)
Dr. Syntax (1894); revision of Cinderella at School
Lost, Strayed or Stolen (1896)

- Jelly Roll Morton (1890–1941)

Jelly's Last Jam (1992); music also by Luther Henderson
Jelly Roll! (1994)

- Al Moss

Tis of Thee (1940); music also by Alex North

- Jeffery Moss (1942–1998)

Double Feature (1981)

- Otto Motzan (1880–1937)

The Show of Wonders (1916); music also by Sigmund Romberg, Herman Timberg
The Passing Show of 1916 (1916); music also by Sigmund Romberg
The Passing Show of 1917 (1917); music also by Sigmund Romberg

- Mark Mulcahy

The Slug Bearers of Kayrol Island (or the Friends of Dr. Rushower) (2004)

- Lance Mulcahy (1931–1995)

One over the Eight (1961)
Park (1970)
The Duenna (1980)
Shakespeare's Cabaret (1980)
Keystone (1981)
Sweet Will (1984)

- Ernst Muller

Professionally Speaking (1986); music also by Frederic Block, Peter Winkler

- Timothy Muller

Blair on Broadway (2007)

- Rich Mullins (1955–1997)

Canticle of the Plains (1997); music also by Mitch McVicker, Beaker

- James Mundy (1907–1983)

The Vamp (1955)

- John Mundy (1886–1971)

The Liar (1950)

- James "Jim" Murdock

Sparkles (1981)

- Mary Murfitt

Oil City Symphony (1986); music also by Mike Craver, Mark Hardwick, Debra Monk
Cowgirls (1996)

- Kevin Murphy (born 1967)

Heathers (2010); music also by Laurence O'Keefe

- Owen Murphy (1893–1965)

Rain or Shine (1929); music also by Milton Ager

- Ted Murray

Take a Bow (1944); music also by Benny Davis

- Romano Musumarro

Cindy – Cendrillo 2002 (2002)

- Richard Myers (1901–1977)

Mr. Cinders (1929); music also by Vivian Ellis

== N ==
- Paul Nassau (1930–2013)

A Joyful Noise (1966); music also by Oscar Brand
The Education of H*Y*M*A*N K*A*P*L*A*N (1968); music also by Oscar Brand

- Robert Lindsey Nassif

Honky-Tonk Highway (1994)
Opal (1992)
3hree – The Flight of the Lawnchair Man (2000); musicals also by Laurence O'Keefe, John Bucchino

- Wesley Naylor

Mama, I Want to Sing! Part 2 (1990)
Born to Sing (1996)

- David Nehls (b. 1964)

The Great American Trailer Park Musical (2005)

- Portia Nelson (1920–2001)

Almost Crazy (1955); music also by James Shelton, Raymond Taylor

- Anthony Newley (1931–1999)

Stop the World – I Want to Get Off (1961); music also by Leslie Bricusse
The Roar of the Greasepaint – The Smell of the Crowd (1965); music also by Leslie Bricusse
The Good Old Bad Old Days (1972); music also by Leslie Bricusse

- Randy Newman (born 1943)

Maybe I'm Doing It Wrong (1982)
Faust (1993)
The Education of Randy Newman (2000)

- Mbongeni Ngema (1955–2023)

Sarafina! (1987); additional songs by Hugh Masekela

- David Nield (born 1941)

Tin Pan Ali (1979)
The Ragged Child (1988)

- Harry Nilsson (1942–1994)

The Point! (1976)

- Monty Norman (1928–2022)

Expresso Bongo (1958); music also by David Heneker
Make Me an Offer (1959); music also by David Heneker
The Art of Living (1960); music also by David Heneker
Belle, or the Ballade of Dr. Crippen (1961)
Songbook (1979); Broadway title: The Moony Shapiro Songbook (1981)
Poppy (1982)

- Alex North (1910–1991)

Tis of Thee (1940); music also by Al Moss

- Frederic Norton (1869–1946)

Chu Chin Chow (1916)

- Vaclav Novák

Bůh anebo Ďábel

- Ivor Novello (1893–1951)

Theodore & Co (1917); music also by Jerome Kern
Glamorous Night (1935)
Careless Rapture (1936)
Crest of the Wave (1937)
The Dancing Years (1939)
Perchance to Dream (1945)
King's Rhapsody (1949)
Gay's the Word (1950)

- Mark Nutter

Wild Men! (1993)
The Bicycle Men (2007)

== O ==
- Ben Oakland (1907–1979)

Hold Your Horses (1933)

- John Thomas Oaks

Star Queen (1995)

- Richard Oberacker

Ace (2006)
Bandstand (2015)

- Pascal Obispo (born 1965)

Les Dix Commandements (2000)

- Richard O'Brien (born 1942)

The Rocky Horror Show (1973)
The Rocky Horror Picture Show (1975 film)

- Desmond O'Connor (born 1972)

Failed States (2006)

- Bill Oddie (born 1941)

Cambridge Circus (1963); music also by Hugh McDonald, David Palmer

- Jacques Offenbach (1819–1880)

The Happiest Girl in the World (1961)

- Michael James Ogborn

Box Office of the Damned (1994)

- Tom O'Horgan (1924–2009)

Senator Joe (1989)

- Laurence O'Keefe (born 1969)

Bat Boy (1997)
La Cava (2000); music also by Stephen Keeling
3hree – The Mice (2000); musicals also by John Bucchino, Robert Lindsey Nassif
Sarah, Plain and Tall (2002)
Cam Jansen (2004); music also by Nell Benjamin
Legally Blonde (2007); music also by Nell Benjamin
Heathers (2010); music also by Kevin Murphy

- Stephen Oliver (1950–1992)

The Life and Adventures of Nicholas Nickleby (1980)
Peter Pan (1982)
Blondel (1983)

- James Olm

The Magdalene (2011)

- Yoko Ono (born 1933)

New York Rock (1994)

- The Open Window (Robert Dennis, Peter Schickele, Stanley Walden)

Oh! Calcutta! (1969)

- Giuseppe Operti (1824?–1886)

The Black Crook (1866); music also by George Bickwell, Thomas Baker

- Roy Orbison (1936–1988)

Only the Lonely: The Roy Orbison Story (1993); music also by others

- Harold Orlob (1883–1982)

Hairpin Harmony (1943)

- Cyril Ornadel (1924–2011)

Pickwick (1963)
Ann Veronica (1969)
Treasure Island (1973)
Great Expectations (1975)

- Will Ortman

Holka Polka (1925)
Cherry Blossoms (1927); music also by Sigmund Romberg

- Mike Oster

Disappearing Act (1996)

- Frank Owens

Shades of Harlem (1983); music also by Ty Stephens, Jeree Wade, Branice McKenzie

== P ==
- Herbert Pagani (1944–1988)

Megalopolis (1972)

- Morty Palitz (1909–1962)

Clues to a Life (1981); music also by Alec Wilder

- David Palmer

Cambridge Circus (1963); music also by Bill Oddie, Hugh McDonald

- Jim Parker (1934–2023)

Follow the Star (1975)

- Trey Parker (born 1969)

The Book of Mormon (2011); music also by Matt Stone and Robert Lopez

- Harry Parr-Davies (1914–1955)

The Lisbon Story (1943)

- Leon Parris (born 1981)

Wolfboy (2009)

- Dolly Parton (1946–2026)

9 to 5 (2008)

- Milton Pascal (1908–1976)

Artists and Models of 1943 (1943); music also by Philip Charig, Dan Shapiro
Follow the Girls (1944); music also by Dan Shapiro, Philip Charig

- Benj Pasek (born 1985)

Edges (2005); music also by Justin Paul
A Christmas Story (2010); music also by Justin Paul
James and the Giant Peach (2010); music also by Justin Paul
Dogfight (2012); music also by Justin Paul
Dear Evan Hansen (2015); music also by Justin Paul

- Václav Patejdl (1954–2023)

Jozef a jeho zázračný farebný plášť (1994)
Grand Pierrot (1995)
Adam Šangala (2003)
Jack Rozparovač (2006)

- Bobby Paul (born 1959)

The Rise of David Levinsky (1987)

- Justin Paul (born 1985)

Edges (2005); music also by Benj Pasek
A Christmas Story (2010); music also by Benj Pasek
James and the Giant Peach (2010); music also by Benj Pasek
Dogfight (2012); music also by Benj Pasek
Dear Evan Hansen (2015); music also by Benj Pasek

- Michal Pavlíček (born 1956)

Excalibur (2003)

- Glenn Paxton

First Impressions (1959); music also by Robert Goldman, George David Weiss

- Richard Peaslee (1930–2016)

Marat/Sade (1965)
US (1966)
Boccaccio (1975)
Miracolo D'Amore (1988)

- Ron Pember (1934–2022)

Jack the Ripper (1974)

- Polly Pen (born 1954)

Goblin Market (1985)
Christina Alberta's Father (1994)
Bed and Sofa (1996)

- Hugo Peretti (1916–1986)

Maggie Flynn (1968); music also by Luigi Creatore, George David Weiss

- Claudia Perry

Queen of Hearts

- William P. Perry (born 1930)

On the Double (1946)
Xanadu: The Marco Polo Musical (1953)
Happily Ever After (1967)
Wind in the Willows (1985)
Mark Twain (1987)

- Benj Pasek

Edges (2005); music also by Justin Paul
A Christmas Story (2010); music also by Justin Paul
James and the Giant Peach (2010); music also by Justin Paul
Dogfight (2012); music also by Justin Paul

- William Frederick Peters

The Passing Show of 1915 (1915); music also by Leo Edwards, J. Leubrie Hill

- Taliep Petersen (1950–2006)

District Six (1987)
Fairyland (1991)
Kat and the Kings (1997)

- Angela Peterson

The Dragonslayers (1980)

- Eric Peterson (born 1946)

Billy Bishop Goes to War (1978); music also by John MacLachlan Gray

- Pet Shop Boys – Neil Tennant (born 1954), Chris Lowe (born 1959)

Closer to Heaven (2001)

- Carl Pflueger (1850–1901)

1492 Up to Date (1892)

- Adolf Philipp (1864–1936)

Alma, Where Do You Live? (1910)
Teresa, Be Mine (1910)
Auction Pinochle (1912)
Adele (1913)
The Midnight Girl (1914)
The Girl Who Smiles (1915)
Two Is Company (1915)

- John Phillips (1935–2001) of The Mamas & the Papas

Man on the Moon (1975)

- Paul Phillips

Jayson (1998); music also by Ron Romanovsky

- Ástor Piazzolla (1921–1992)

Dangerous Games (1989)

- Phil Pickett (born 1946)

Casper (1999); music also by Henry Marsh

- Peter Pinne (born 1937)

Caroline (1971)
A Bunch of Ratbags (2005)

- Don Pippin (1926–2022)

Fashion (1974)

- Robert Planquette (1848–1903)

Les cloches de Corneville (1877); English title The Chimes of Normandy

- Leon Pober (1920–1971)

Beg, Borrow or Steal (1960)

- Lee Pockriss (1924–2011)

Ernest in Love (1960)
Tovarich (1963)

- Ray Pohlman (1930–1990)

Catch My Soul (1968); music also by Emil Dean Zoghby

- Dave Pollecutt

African Footprint (2000)

- Tom Polum

Pilgrim Souls (1997)

- David Pomeranz (born 1951)

Time (1986); music also by Jeff Daniels
Little Tramp (1992)
A Tale of Two Cities (1998)
Scandalous: The Life and Trials of Aimee Semple McPherson (2005); also known as Saving Aimee; music also by David Friedman

- Pooh

Pinocchio: Il Grande Musical (2003)

- Brian Portelli

Hillbrow (2004)

- Cole Porter (1891–1964)

See America First (1916)
Hitchy-Koo of 1919 (1919)
The Greenwich Village Follies of 1924 (1924)
Paris (1928); music also by Walter Kollo, Harry Warren, Louis Alter, Fred E. Ahlert
Fifty Million Frenchmen (1929)
Wake Up and Dream! (1929); music also by others
The New Yorkers (1930)
Gay Divorce (1932)
Nymph Errant (1933)
Anything Goes (1934)
Jubilee (1935)
Red, Hot and Blue! (1936)
Rosalie (1937 film)
You Never Know (1938); music also by Robert Katscher
Leave It to Me! (1938)
DuBarry Was a Lady (1939); also a 1943 film
Panama Hattie (1940); also a 1942 film
Let's Face It! (1941)
Something for the Boys (1943)
Mexican Hayride (1944); also a 1948 film
Seven Lively Arts (1944)
Around the World (1946)
Kiss Me, Kate (1948); also a 1953 film
Out of This World (1950)
Can-Can (1953); also a 1960 film
Silk Stockings (1955)
Les Girls (1957 film)
Aladdin (1958); television musical
The Decline and Fall of the Entire World as Seen through the Eyes of Cole Porter (1965)
Cole (1974)
Unsung Cole (1977)
Happy New Year (1980)
Wodka Cola (1986); German version of 1938 musical Leave It to Me!
High Society (1987); also a 1956 film
A Swell Party (1991)
Let's Do It! (1994); music also by Noël Coward
You're the Top (1995)
Porterphiles (2002)
Love, Linda: The Life of Mrs. Cole Porter (2009)

- Garth Porter (born 1948)

The Man from Snowy River (2002); music also by Bruce Rowland, Lee Kernaghan

- Rachel Portman (born 1960)

Little House on the Prairie (2008)

- Mischa Portnoff (1901–1979)

Happy As Larry (1950); music also by Wesley Portnoff

- Wesley Portnoff (1900–1969)

Happy As Larry (1950); music also by Mischa Portnoff

- Gary Portnoy (born 1956)

Preppies (1983); music also by Judy Hart Angelo

- George Posford (1906–1976)

Goodnight, Vienna (1931)
Balalaika (1936); music also by Bernard Grün
Evangeline (1946); music also by Harry Jacobson
Her Excellency (1949); co-composed with Manning Sherwin
Zip Goes a Million (1951)
Happy Holiday (1954)

- Matthew Potger

The Last Laugh (1995)

- Nick Powell

The Wolves in the Walls (2006)

- Will Power

The Seven (2006); additional music by Justin Ellington and Will Hammond

- Gérard Presgurvic (born 1953)

Roméo et Juliette, de la Haine à l'Amour (2001)
Autant en emport le vent (2003)

- André Previn (1929–2019)

A Party with Betty Comden and Adolph Green (1958); music also by Leonard Bernstein, Jule Styne, Saul Chaplin, Roger Edens
Coco (1969)
The Good Companions (1974)

- Alan Price (born 1942)

Andy Capp (1982)

- Jonathan Price

Escape from Eldorado (1990)
Rumpelstiltskin (1990)
Dead Poets (1990)
Who Killed Cock Robin (1991)
Lao Jiu (老九) (2005)

- Matthew Pritchard

Ripper The Musical (2007); music also by Gerry Ware

- Bradford Proctor

Bunked! (2010)

== Q ==
- Queen

We Will Rock You (2002)

- James Quinn (1936–2025)

Do Black Patent Leather Shoes Really Reflect Up? (1982); music also by Alaric Jans

== R ==
- Sergei Rachmaninov (1873–1943)

Anya, "Anastasia" (1965); music adapted by Robert Wright, George Forrest
Anastasia (revision of Anya) (1991); music adapted by Robert Wright, George Forrest

- Peter Rafelson (born 1960)

Voyeurz (1996); music also by Michael J. Lewis

- Alexander Rahbari (born 1948)

Exta$y: The Musical to Die For (1996)

- A. R. Rahman (born 1966)

Bombay Dreams (2002)
The Lord of the Rings (2006); music also by Värttinä

- David Raksin (1912–2004)

If the Shoe Fits (1946)

- Ramiro Ramirez

Sancocho (1979); music also by Jimmy Justice

- Joe Raposo (1937–1989)

Sing Muse! (1961)
Raggedy Ann (1986)
A Wonderful Life (1991)

- Michael Rapp

Quasimodo, Prince of Fools (1996)

- Mark Razovsky

Strider: The Story of a Horse (1979); music also by S. Vetkin, Norman L. Berman

- Mike Read (born 1947)

Young Apollo
Oscar
Great Expectations (1993)
A Christmas Carol (2000)
Cliff (2003)
Ricky Nelson...Teenage Idol
Betjeman

- Robert Reale (born 1956)

The Dinosaur Musical
Quark Victory
Once around the City (2001)
A Year with Frog and Toad (2002)
Johnny Baseball: The New Red Sox Musical (2010)

- Zachary Redler

Perez Hilton Saves the Universe (or at Least the Greater Los Angeles Area) (2008)

- Skip Redwine (1926–1987)

Frank Merriwell: Honor Challenged (1971); music also by Larry Frank

- Les Reed (1935–2019)

Beautiful and Damned (2004); music also by Roger Cook

- David Reeves

Cyrano (1996)
Seven Little Australians (1988)

- Marcus Reeves (born 1979)

Postcards from God (2007)

- Ilene Reid

Bingo (2005); music also by Michael Heitzman, David Holcenberg

- Mike Reid (born 1947)

Different Fields (1996)

- George Reinblatt (born 1977)

Evil Dead: The Musical (2006); music also by Christopher Bond, Frank Cipolla, Melissa Morris

- Aladár Rényi (1885–1944)

Suzi (1914)

- Harry Revel (1905–1958)

Are You with It? (1945)

- Rudi Revil (1916–1983)

Crazy with the Heat (1941); music also by Irvin Graham, Dana Suesse

- Edward E. Rice (1849–1924)

Evangeline (1874)
Adonis (1884); music also by John Eller

- Claibe Richardson (1929–2003)

The Grass Harp (1971)
Lola (1982)
The Night of the Hunter (1998)
Saturday Night at Grossinger's (2003)

- Jeff Richmond (born 1961)

Mean Girls (2017)

- Lynne Riley

Drake's Dream (1977); music also by Richard Riley

- Richard Riley

Drake's Dream (1977); music also by Lynne Riley

- Allan Roberts (1905–1966)

All for Love (1949); music also by Lester Lee

- Andy Roberts (born 1946)

Censored Scenes from King Kong (1980)

- Bob Roberts

Tom Jones (1964)

- Jimmy Roberts

I Love You, You're Perfect, Now Change (1996)
The Thing About Men (2003)

- Michael Roberts

Golf: The Musical (2003)
The Fartiste (2006)
My American Family (2008)

- John Robinson

Behind the Iron Mask (2005)
Too Close to the Sun (2009)

- Phylliss K. Robinson

Angel Levine (1995)

- Alfred G. Robyn (1860–1935)

The Yankee Consul (1903); also a 1924 film
The Yankee Tourist (1907)
Princess Beggar (1907)
All for the Ladies (1913)
Pretty Mrs. Smith (1914)

- Eric Rockwell

The Musical of Musicals (The Musical!) (2005)

- Heidi Rodewald

Passing Strange (2008); music also by Stew

- Mary Rodgers (1931–2014)

Once Upon a Mattress (1959)
From A to Z (1960); music also by others
Hot Spot (1963); music also by Stephen Sondheim
The Mad Show (1966)
Working (1978); music also by Stephen Schwartz, James Taylor, Craig Carnelia, Micki Grant
Davy Jones' Locker (1987)
Hey, Love (1996)

- Richard Rodgers (1902–1979)

One Minute Please
Fly With Me (1920)
Poor Little Ritz Girl (1920); music also by Sigmund Romberg
The Melody Man (1924)
The Garrick Gaieties (1925)
Dearest Enemy (1925)
The Girl Friend (1926)
The Garrick Gaieties (1926)
Peggy-Ann (1926)
Betsy (1926)
A Connecticut Yankee (1927)
She's My Baby (1928)
Present Arms (1928)
Chee-Chee (1928)
Spring Is Here (1929)
Heads Up! (1929)
Ever Green (1930)
Simple Simon (1930)
America's Sweetheart (1931)
Jumbo (1935)
On Your Toes (1936)
Babes in Arms (1937)
I'd Rather Be Right (1937)
I Married an Angel (1938); also a 1942 film
The Boys from Syracuse (1938); also a 1940 film
Too Many Girls (1939)
Higher and Higher (1940)
Pal Joey (1940); also a 1957 film
By Jupiter (1942)
Oklahoma! (1943); also a 1955 film
Carousel (1945); also a 1956 film
Allegro (1947)
South Pacific (1949); also a 1958 film
The King and I (1951); also a 1956 film
Me and Juliet (1953)
Pipe Dream (1955)
Cinderella (1957); television musical
Flower Drum Song (1958); also a 1961 film
The Sound of Music (1959); also a 1965 film
No Strings (1962)
Do I Hear a Waltz? (1965)
Two by Two (1970)
Rodgers & Hart (1975)
Rex (1976)
I Remember Mama (1979)
A Grand Night for Singing (1993)
State Fair (1996); also 1945 and 1962 films
Beguiled Again (1997)

- Andrew Rohn

Walmartopia (2007)

- Ron Romanovsky

Jayson (1998); music also by Paul Phillips

- Sigmund Romberg (1887–1951)

The Whirl of the Wind (1914)
The Passing Show of 1914 (1914); music also by Harry Carroll
Dancing Around (1914); music also by Harry Carroll
Maid in America (1915); music also by Harry Carroll
Hands Up (1915); music also by E. Ray Goetz
The Blue Paradise (1915); music also by Edmund Eysler
A World of Pleasure (1915)
Robinson Crusoe, Jr. (1916); music also by James F. Hanley
The Passing Show of 1916 (1916); music also by Otto Motzan
The Girl from Brazil (1916); music also by Robert Winterberg
The Show of Wonders (1916); music also by Otto Motzan, Herman Timberg
Follow Me (1916); additional music by others
Her Soldier Boy (1916); music also by Emmerich Kálmán
The Passing Show of 1917 (1917); music also by Otto Motzan
My Lady's Glove (1917); music also by Oscar Straus
Maytime (1917)
Doing Our Bit (1917); music also by Herman Timberg
Over the Top (1917)
Sinbad (1918); music also by George Gershwin and others
The Passing Show of 1918 (1918); music also by Jean Schwartz
The Melting of Molly (1918)
Monte Cristo, Jr. (1919); music also by Jean Schwartz
The Passing Show of 1919 (1919)
The Magic Melody (1919)
Poor Little Ritz Girl (1920); music also by Richard Rodgers
Love Birds (1921)
Blossom Time (1921); music adapted from themes of Franz Schubert
Bombo (1921); music also by others
The Blushing Bride (1922)
The Rose of Stamboul (1922); music also by Leo Fall
Springtime of Youth (1922); music also by Walter Kollo
The Dancing Girl (1923)
The Passing Show of 1923 (1923); music also by Jean Schwartz
Innocent Eyes (1924); music also by Jean Schwartz
Marjorie (1924); music also by Herbert Stothart, Philip Culkin, Stephen Jones
The Passing Show of 1924 (1924); music also by Jean Schwartz
Artists and Models of 1924 (1924); music also by J. Fred Coots
The Student Prince (1924)
Louie the 14th (1925)
Artists and Models of 1925 (1925); music also by Alfred Goodman, J. Fred Coots, Maurice Rubens
Princess Flavia (1925)
The Desert Song (1926)
Cherry Blossoms (1927); music also by Will Ortman
My Maryland (1927)
My Princess (1927)
The Love Call (1927)
Rosalie (1928); music also by George Gershwin
The New Moon (1928)
Nina Rosa (1930)
East Wind (1931)
Melody (1933)
May Wine (1935)
Forbidden Melody (1936)
Sunny River (1941)
Up in Central Park (1945)
My Romance (1948)
The Girl in Pink Tights (1954)

- Harold J. Rome (1908–1993)

Pins and Needles (1937)
Sing Out the News (1938)
Let Freedom Sing (1942)
Call Me Mister (1946)
Bless You All (1950)
Wish You Were Here (1952)
Fanny (1954)
Destry Rides Again (1959)
I Can Get It for You Wholesale (1962)
Harold Rome's Gallery (1964)
The Zulu and the Zayda (1965)
Scarlett (1970); 1972 London Title: Gone with the Wind

- Ann Ronell (1906–1993)

Count Me In (1942)

- Patrick Rose

Jubalay (1974)
A Bistro Car on the CNR (1978)

- Joshua Rosenblum (born 1963)

Fermat's Last Tango (2000)
Bush Is Bad (2005)

- Milton Rosenstock (1917–1992)

Nash at Nine (1973)

- Laurence Rosenthal (born 1926)

Sherry! (1967)

- Charles Rosoff (1895–1988)

Earl Carroll's Vanities of 1940 (1940); music also by Peter DeRose

- Brad Ross

Little by Little (1999)

- Jerry Ross (1926–1955)

John Murray Anderson's Almanac (1953); music also by Richard Adler and others
The Pajama Game (1954); music also by Richard Adler; also a 1975 film
Damn Yankees (1955); music also by Richard Adler; also a 1958 film

- Robbie Roth

Flashdance (2008)

- Dana P. Rowe (born 1957)

Zombie Prom (1996)
The Fix (1997)
The Witches of Eastwick (2000)
The Ballad of Bonnie and Clyde (2005)
Brother Russia (2012)

- Bruce Rowland (born 1942)

The Man from Snowy River (2002); music also by Lee Kernaghan, Garth Porter

- William Roy (1928–2003)

Maggie (1953)
The Penny Friend (1966)

- Maurice "Maurie" Rubens (1893–1948)

Artists and Models of 1925 (1925); music also by J. Fred Coots, Alfred Goodman, Sigmund Romberg
A Night in Paris (1926); music also by J. Fred Coots
Artists and Models of 1927 (1927); music also by Harry Akst

- Paul Rubens (1875–1917)

Florodora (1899); music also by Leslie Stuart
A Country Girl (1902); music also by Lionel Monckton
Three Little Maids (1903); music also by others
The Cingalee (1904); music also by Lionel Monckton
A Parisian Model (1906)
The Dairymaids (1907); music also by Frank E. Tours and others
The Balkan Princess (1910)
Betty (1914); music also by others
The Girl from Utah (1914); music also by Sidney Jones, Jerome Kern and others
To-Night's the Night (1914)
The Happy Day (1916); music also by Sidney Jones
Naughty Cinderella (1925)

- Eli Rubinstein (1929–2003)

Light, Lively and Yiddish (1970)

- Harry Ruby (1895–1974)

Helen of Troy, New York (1923)
No Other Girl (1924)
The Ramblers (1926)
Lucky (1927); additional music by Jerome Kern
The Five O'Clock Girl (1927)
Animal Crackers (1928)
Top Speed (1929)
High Kickers (1941)

- Gary Ruffin

The Survival of St. Joan (1970); music also by Hank Ruffin

- Hank Ruffin

The Survival of St. Joan (1970); music also by Gary Ruffin

- Joseph Rumshinsky (1881–1956)

The Singing Rabbi (1931); music also by Harry Lubin
Oy Is Dus a Leben (1942)

- Murray Rumshinsky

The President's Daughter (1970)

- Todd Rundgren (born 1948)

Up Against It (1989)

- Michael Rupert (born 1951)

3 Guys Naked from the Waist Down (1985)
Mail (1988)

- Adryan Russ

Inside Out (1994)

- Anna Russell (1911–2006)

Anna Russell's Little Show (1953)

- Brenda Russell (born 1949)

The Color Purple (2005); music also by Allee Willis, Stephen Bray

- Willy Russell (born 1947)

The Match Girls (1966)
Blood Brothers (1983)

- Graham Russell (born 1950)

All Out of Love (2018)

- Peter Rutherford

The Hatpin (2008)

== S ==
- Norman Sachs

My Old Friends (1979); music also by Mel Mandel

- Stormy Sacks

Lamb Chop on Broadway (1994)

- Joshua Salzman

I Love You Because (2006)

- Ralph Samantha

Alladin de Musical (2002); music also by Jan Verheyen

- Arthur Samuels (1888–1938)

Poppy (1923); music also by Stephen Jones

- Edmond Samuels (1895–1973)

The Highwayman (1950)

- Jerry Sanders

Radical Radio (1995); music also by Karmo Sanders, Steve Underwood

- Karmo Sanders

Radical Radio (1995); music also by Jerry Sanders, Steve Underwood

- Mark Sandrich, Jr. (1928–1995)

Ben Franklin in Paris (1964); music also by Jerry Herman

- Tom Sankey

The Golden Screw (1966)

- Irene Sankoff

Come from Away (2013); music also by David Hein

- Jill Santoriello (born 1965)

A Tale of Two Cities (1996)

- Leslie Sarony (1897–1985)

Three Cheers (1928); music also by John Raymond Hubbell, Ray Henderson
Love Lies (1929)

- Stan Satlin (born 1938)

Children of Adam (1977)

- Mark Savage

The Ballade of Little Mikey: The Birth of an Activist (1994)

- Tom Savage

Musical Chairs (1980)

- Matt Sax

Venice (2010)

- Ray Scantlin

Joseph McCarthy Is Alive and Living in Dade County (1977)

- Milton Schafer (1920–2020)

Bravo Giovanni (1962)
Drat! The Cat! (1965)

- Steve Schalchlin (born 1953)

The Last Session (1997)
The Big Voice: God or Merman? (2002)

- Nitra Scharfman

The Lieutenant (1975); music also by Gene Curty, Chuck Strand

- Ben Schatz

Dragapella! (2001)

- Ton Scherpenzeel (born 1952)

Kruimeltje (2000)

- Peter Schickele (1935–2024) (member of The Open Window)

Oh! Calcutta! (1969); music also by Robert Dennis, Stanley Walden

- Paul Schierhorn (1951–2012)

The News (1985)

- John Schimmel

Pump Boys and Dinettes (1981); music also by others

- Irving Schlein (1905–1986)

Love Life (1948); ballet music only, music by Kurt Weill

- Adam Schlesinger (1967–2020)

Cry-Baby (2007)

- Don Schlitz (born 1952)

The Adventures of Tom Sawyer (2001)

- Harvey Schmidt (1929–2018)

The Fantasticks (1960)
110 in the Shade (1963)
I Do! I Do! (1966)
Celebration (1969)
Colette (1970)
Philemon (1975)
Colette Collage (1983)
Mirette (1996)
The Show Goes On (1997)
Roadside (2001)

- Joshua Schmidt

Adding Machine (2007)
A Minister's Wife (2009)
Midwestern Gothic (2017)

- Moritz Schneider (born 1976)

Dällebach Kari (2010)
Der Besuch der alten Dame (2014)

- Gary Schocker (born 1959)

The Awakening (1999)
Far from the Madding Crowd (2000)

- Mark Schoenfeld

Brooklyn (2004); music also by Barri McPherson

- Claude-Michel Schönberg (born 1944)

La Révolution Française (1973); music also by Raymond Jeannot
Les Misérables (1980)
Miss Saigon (1989)
Martin Guerre (1995)
The Pirate Queen (2006)

- Eric Schorr

Young Tom Edison (1997)

- Barbara Schottenfeld

I Can't Keep Running in Place (1981)
Catch Me if I Fall (1990)

- John Schroeder (1935–2017)

Pull Both Ends (1972); music also by Anthony King

- Franz Schubert (1797–1828)

Blossom Time (1921); music adapted by Sigmund Romberg

- Norbert Schultze (1911–2002)

Käpt'n Bay-Bay (1959); also a 1953 film

- Mort Schuman (1936–1991)

Budgie (1988)

- Walter Schumann (1913–1958)

3 for Tonight (1955)

- Arthur Schwartz (1900–1984)

The Grand Street Follies of 1926 (1926)
The New Yorkers (1927); music also by Edgar Fairchild, Charles Schwab
The Little Show (1929); music also by others
The Grand Street Follies of 1929 (1929); music also by Max Ewing, Max and Nathaniel Lief
Here Comes the Bride (1930)
The Co-Optimists (1930); music also by others
The Second Little Show (1930); music also by others
Princess Charming (1930); music also by Albert Sirmay
Three's a Crowd (1930); music also by others
The Band Wagon (1931)
Flying Colors (1932)
Nice Goings On (1933)
Revenge with Music (1934)
At Home Abroad (1935)
Follow the Sun (1936)
Virginia (1937)
Between the Devil (1937)
Stars in Your Eyes (1939)
Park Avenue (1946)
Inside U.S.A. (1948)
A Tree Grows in Brooklyn (1951)
By the Beautiful Sea (1954)
The Gay Life (1961)
Jennie (1963)
That's Entertainment (1972)

- Jean Schwartz (1878–1956)

A Yankee Circus on Mars (1905), music also by Manuel Klein
Vera Violetta (1911); music also by Edmund Eysler, George M. Cohan, Louis A. Hirsch
The Passing Show of 1913 (1913); music also by Al W. Brown
The Passing Show of 1918 (1918); music also by Sigmund Romberg
Monte Cristo, Jr. (1919); music also by Sigmund Romberg
The Passing Show of 1921 (1921)
The Passing Show of 1923 (1923); music also by Sigmund Romberg
Innocent Eyes (1924); music also by Sigmund Romberg
The Passing Show of 1924 (1924); music also by Sigmund Romberg
Sunny Days (1928)

- Stephen Schwartz (born 1948)

Godspell (1971)
Pippin (1972)
The Magic Show (1974)
The Baker's Wife (1976)
Working (1978); music also by Mary Rodgers, James Taylor, Craig Carnelia, Micki Grant
Children of Eden (1991)
Wicked (2003)
Captain Louie (2005)
Snapshots (2021)

- Milton Schwartzwald (1891–1950)

Flora Bella (1916); music also by Charles Cuvillier
Be Yourself! (1924); music also by Lewis E. Gensler

- Ernest G. Schweikert

Rumple (1957)

- Matthew Scott

Mother Clap's Molly House (2001)

- Raymond Scott (1908–1944)

Lute Song (1946)

- Don Sebesky (1937–2023)

Prince of Central Park (1989)

- Sholom Secunda (1894–1974)

Bagels and Yox (1951); music also by Hy Jacobson
Bei Mir Bist Du Schoen (1961)

- Albert Selden

Small Wonder (1948); music also by Baldwin Bergersen

- Harold Seletsky

Hot Klezmer (1998); music also by Mary Feinsinger

- Matty Selman

Young Rube (1989)

- Dov Seltzer (born 1932)

The Megilla of Itzik Manger (1968)
To Live Another Summer, to Pass Another Winter (1971)

- Will Severin

A Tale of Cinderella (1994); music also by George David Weiss

- The Shadows

Babes in the Wood (1965)

- Michael Shaieb

Go-Go Beach (2006); music also by Brent Lord
Through a Glass, Darkly (2008)

- Marc Shaiman (born 1959)

Hairspray (2002)
Martin Short: Fame Becomes Me (2006)
Catch Me If You Can (2009)
Charlie and the Chocolate Factory (2013)

- Joe Shane

White Noise: A Cautionary Musical (2011); music also by Robert Morris, Steven Morris

- Julie Shannon

The Christmas Schooner (1996)

- Dan Shapiro

Artists and Models of 1943 (1943); music also by Philip Charig, Milton Pascal
Follow the Girls (1944); music also by Milton Pascal, Philip Charig

- Allen Shawn (born 1948)

Luck, Pluck, and Virtue (1995)

- Nancy Shayne

Marcy in the Galaxy (2008)

- Toni Shearer

Mother Earth (1972)

- Jonathan Sheffer

Hundreds of Hats (1995); music also by Marvin Hamlisch, Alan Menken

- Buddy Sheffield

Cleavage (1982)

- Duncan Sheik (born 1969)

Spring Awakening (2006)
American Psycho (2013)

- James Shelton

Dance Me a Song (1950)
Mrs. Patterson (1954)
Almost Crazy (1955); music also by Portia Nelson, Raymond Taylor

- Tom Shelton (born 1955)

Caddie Woodlawn (2011)

- Ted Shen (born 1945)

A Second Chance (2011)

- Andrew Sherman

Debbie Does Dallas: The Musical (2002)

- Garry Sherman (b. 1933)

Comin' Uptown (1979)
Amen Corner (1983)

- Kim D. Sherman

O Pioneers! (2001)

- Richard M. Sherman (1928–2024)

Victory Canteen (1971); music also by Robert B. Sherman
Over Here! (1974); music also by Robert B. Sherman
Dawgs! (1983); music also by Robert B. Sherman
Charlie Sent Me! (1984)
Busker Alley (1994); music also by Robert B. Sherman
Chitty Chitty Bang Bang (2002); music also by Robert B. Sherman
Mary Poppins (2005); music also by Robert B. Sherman and George Stiles

- Robert B. Sherman (1925–2012)

Victory Canteen (1971); music also by Richard M. Sherman
Over Here! (1974); music also by Richard M. Sherman
Dawgs! (1983); music also by Richard M. Sherman
Busker Alley (1994); music also by Richard M. Sherman
Chitty Chitty Bang Bang (2002); music also by Richard M. Sherman
Mary Poppins (2005); music also by Richard M. Sherman and George Stiles

- Robert J. Sherman (born 1968)

Love Birds (2015)
Bumblescratch (2016)
A Spoonful of Sherman (2014, 2018)

- Ned Sherrin (1931–2007)

Cindy-Ella or I Gotta Shoe (1962); music also by Caryl Brahms

- Manning Sherwin (1902–1974)

Under the Counter (1947)
Her Excellency (1949); music also by George Posford

- Harvey Shield (born 1946)

Hamelin: A Musical Tale from Rags to Riches (1985); music also by Richard Jarboe

- David Shire (born 1937)

Cyrano (1958)
The Grand Tour (1959)
Starting Here, Starting Now (1977)
Baby (1983)
Urban Blight (1988)
Closer Than Ever (1989)
big: the musical (1996)
Take Flight (2007)

- Max Showalter (1917–2000)

My Square Laddie (1957)
Harrigan 'n Hart (1985); music also by Edward Harrigan, David Braham
Touch of the Child

- Michael Shubert

Shabbatai (1995); music also by Michael Edwin

- Pierce Siebers

A Very Potter Senior Year (2012); music also by Clark Baxtresser, A.J. Holmes, Darren Criss

- Arthur Siegel (1923–1994)

Mask and Gown (1957); music also by Dorothea Freitag, Ronny Graham
Corkscrews! (1982)
Tallulah (1983)

- Carl Sigman (1909–2000)

Angel in the Wings (1947)

- Doug Silver

Sidd (2006)

- Fred Silver

In Gay Company (1974)
Sterling Silver (1979)

- Jeffrey Silverman

Broadway Scandals of 1928 (1982)
Options (1985)

- Stanley Silverman (born 1938)

Dr. Selavy's Magic Theatre or Swinging at the Stock Exchange (1972)
Up from Paradise (1973)

- Martin Silvestri

The Fields of Ambrosia (1996)
Johnny Guitar (2004); music also by Joel Higgins

- Lucy Simon (1940–2022)

The Secret Garden (1991)
Zhivago (2006)
Doctor Zhivago (2011)

- Paul Simon (born 1941)

The Capeman (1998)

- Nana Simonpoulos

American Dreams: Lost and Found (2003)

- Ted Simons

Potholes (1979)

- Allen Simpson

Fellowship! (2005)

- Bland Simpson

Hot Grog (1977); music also by Jim Wann

- Gerald Singer

Frère Jacques (1968)

- Peter Sipos

Jeanne la pucelle (1997)

- Noble Sissle (1889–1975)

Shuffle Along, or, the Making of the Musical Sensation of 1921 and All That Followed (2016); music also by Eubie Blake

- Peter Skellern (1947–2017)

Who Plays Wins (1985); music also by Richard Stilgoe

- Matthew Sklar (born 1973)

The Rhythm Club
Wicked City
The Wedding Singer (2006)
Elf (2010)

- Julian Slade (1930–2006)

Salad Days (1954)
Free as Air (1957)
Follow That Girl (1960)
Hooray for Daisy! (1960)
Wildest Dreams (1961)
Vanity Fair (1962)
Trelawney (1972)

- Walter Slaughter (1860–1908)

Alice in Wonderland (1886)

- A. Baldwin Sloane (1872–1925)

The Wizard of Oz (1902); music also by Paul Tietjens and others
The Greenwich Village Follies of 1919 (1919); music also by others

- Charlie Smalls (1944–1987)

The Wiz (1975)

- Christopher Smith

Amazing Grace (2012)

- Walt Smith

Ari (1971)

- Tom Snow (born 1947)

Heartbeats (1989); music also by Amanda McBroom, Gerald Sternbach, Michele Brourman
Footloose (1998)

- Ted Sod (born 1951)

27 Rue de Fleurus (2008)

- Bill Solly

Boy Meets Boy (1975)
The Great American Backstage Musical: an Intimate Epic (1976)

- Stephen Sondheim (1930–2021)

Saturday Night (1954)
A Funny Thing Happened on the Way to the Forum (1962); also a 1966 film
Hot Spot (1963); music also by Mary Rodgers
Anyone Can Whistle (1964)
Evening Primrose (1967)
Company (1970)
Follies (1971)
A Little Night Music (1973); also a 1977 film
Sondheim Evening: A Musical Tribute (1973); additional music by Leonard Bernstein, Richard Rodgers, Jule Styne
The Frogs (1974)
Pacific Overtures (1976)
Side by Side by Sondheim (1976); additional music by Leonard Bernstein, Mary Rodgers, Richard Rodgers, Jule Styne
Sweeney Todd, the Demon Barber of Fleet Street (1979); also a 2007 film
Marry Me a Little (1980)
Merrily We Roll Along (1981)
A Stephen Sondheim Evening (1983)
You're Gonna Love Tomorrow (1983)
Sunday in the Park with George (1984)
Into the Woods (1987); also a 2014 film
Assassins (1990)
Sondheim: A Celebration at Carnegie Hall (1992)
Putting It Together (1992)
Passion (1994)
Sondheim Tonight (1998)
Moving On: A 70th Birthday Celebration (2000)
Bounce (2003)
Road Show (2008); revision of Bounce
Sondheim on Sondheim (2010)
Here We Are (2023 - produced posthumously)

- Kim Sorensen

Egtved Pigen

- Ondřej Soukup (born 1951)

Johanka z Arku (2000)
Elixír života (2005)

- John Philip Sousa (1854–1932)

Désirée (1884)
Teddy & Alice (1987); music also by Richard Kapp

- Henry Souvaine

Merry-Go-Round (1927); music also by Jay Gorney

- Saul Spangenberg

The English Only Restaurant (1990); music also by Sergio García Marruz

- Mira J. Spektor (1928–2021)

The Housewives' Cantata (1980)

- David Spencer

Phantom of the Opera (1997)

- Fred Spielman (1906–1997)

A Lady Says Yes (1945); music also by Arthur Gershwin

- Jason Sprague

Always (1997); music also by William May

- Philip Springer (b. 1926)

The Chosen (1988)
A Song Floating (1994)

- Fred Stamer

Buttrio Square (1952); music also by Arthur Jones

- Dave Stamper (1883–1963)

Ziegfeld Follies of 1916 (1916); music also by Jerome Kern, Louis Hirsch
Ziegfeld Follies of 1922 (1922); music also by Louis Hirsch

- Peter Stannard

Lola Montez (1958)

- Keith Statham

Share My Lettuce (1957); music also by Patrick Gowers

- Miloš Štědroň (born 1942)

Nana (2005)

- Jim Steinman (1947–2021)

More Than You Deserve (1973)
Tanz der Vampire (1997); 2002 Broadway title: Dance of the Vampires

- Geoff Stephens (1934–2020)

Dear Anyone (1983)
Off the Wall: A Revuesical (1991)

- Ty Stephens

Shades of Harlem (1983); music also by Frank Owens, Jeree Wade, Branice McKenzie

- Walt Stepp

Mark Twain's Blues (2008)

- Sam H. Stept (1897–1964)

Shady Lady (1933); music also by Jesse Greer
Yokel Boy (1939); music also by Lew Brown, Charles Tobias

- Harold Stern

Artists and Models of 1930 (1930); music also by Ernie Golden

- Gerald Sternbach

Heartbeats (1989); music also by Amanda McBroom, Michele Brourman, Tom Snow

- Ann Sternberg

Gertrude Stein's First Reader (1969)

- Steve Sterner

Lovers (1975)

- Monty Stevens

Jane Eyre (1961)

- Stew (born 1961)

Passing Strange (2008); music also by Heidi Rodewald

- Dave Stewart (born 1952)

Barbarella (2004)
Ghost (2011); music also by Glen Ballard

- Robb Stewart

Chrysanthemum (1956)

- Rod Stewart (born 1945)

Tonight's the Night (2003)

- Dan Sticco

A Change in the Heir (1990)

- George Stiles (born 1961)

Just So (1985)
Moll Flanders (1993)
Peter Pan: A Musical Adventure (1996)
Honk! The Ugly Duckling (1997)
The 3 Musketeers (2001)
Tom Jones (2004)
Mary Poppins (2005); music also by Richard M. Sherman and Robert B. Sherman
Betty Blue Eyes (2011)
Soho Cinders (2011)
Travels With My Aunt (2016)
Half a Sixpence (2016); music also by David Heneker
The Wind in the Willows (2016)

- Richard Stilgoe (born 1943)

Who Plays Wins (1985); music also by Peter Skellern
Body Work (1987)
Brilliant the Dinosaur (1992)

- Nick Stimson

NHS – The Musical (2006); music also by Jimmy Jewell

- Sting (born 1951)

The Last Ship (2014)

- Louis St. Louis

Truckload (1975)

- Jeffrey Stock

Triumph of Love (1997)

- Michael Stockler

Quilt

- Joop Stokkermans (1937–2012)

De Engel van Amsterdam (1975)
Nijntje (2001)
Kunt u mij de weg naar Hamelen vertellen, mijnheer? (2003)

- Janusz Stoklosa

Metro (1991)

- Mike Stoller (born 1933)

Smokey Joe's Cafe (1995); music also by Jerry Leiber
The People in the Picture (2011); music also by Artie Butler

- Robert Stolz (1880–1975)

Night of Love (1941)
Mr. Strauss Goes to Boston (1945)

- Harry Stone

Chase a Rainbow (1980)

- Matt Stone (born 1971)

The Book of Mormon (2011); music also by Trey Parker and Robert Lopez

- Herbert Stothart (1885–1949)

Always You (1920)
Tickle Me (1920)
Jimmie (1920)
Daffy Dill (1922)
Wildflower (1923); music also by Vincent Youmans
Mary Jane McKane (1923); music also by Vincent Youmans
Vogues of 1924 (1924)
Marjorie (1924); music also by Sigmund Romberg, Philip Culkin, Stephen Jones
Rose-Marie (1924); music also by Rudolf Friml
Song of the Flame (1925); music also by George Gershwin; also a 1930 film
Golden Dawn (1927); music also by Emmerich Kálmán
Good Boy (1928)
Polly (1929); music also by Philip Charig

- Adrian Stout

Shockheaded Peter (1998); music also by Martyn Jacques, Adrian Huge

- Matthew Strachan (born 1970)

Next Door's Baby (2008)

- Jack Strachley

Spread It Abroad (1936)

- Willard Straight

The Athenian Touch (1964)

- Chuck Strand

The Lieutenant (1975); music also by Gene Curty, Nitra Scharfman

- Oscar Straus (1870–1954)

The Chocolate Soldier (1909)
My Lady's Glove (1917); music also by Sigmund Romberg

- Johann Strauss II (1825–1899)

The Great Waltz (1930); music adapted by Robert Wright, George Forrest
Paradise Found (2010)

- Charles Strouse (1928–2025)

Bye Bye Birdie (1960)
All American (1962)
Golden Boy (1964)
It's a Bird...It's a Plane...It's Superman (1966)
Applause (1970)
Six (1971)
I and Albert (1972)
Annie (1977)
A Broadway Musical (1978)
Charlie and Algernon (1979); London title: Flowers for Algernon
Bring Back Birdie (1981)
Nightingale (1982, children's opera)
Dance a Little Closer (1983)
Mayor (1985)
Rags (1986)
Annie 2: Miss Hannigan's Revenge (1989)
Nick & Nora (1991)
Annie Warbucks (1993)
Real Men (2005)
Studio (2006)
Minsky's (2009)

- Leslie Stuart (1863–1928)

Florodora (1899); music also by Paul Rubens
The Silver Slipper (1901)
The School Girl (1903)
The Belle of Mayfair (1906)
Havana (1908)
Captain Kidd (1910)
The Slim Princess (1911)
Peggy (1911)

- Dan Studney

Reefer Madness! (1998)

- Grant Sturiale

Olympus on My Mind (1986)

- Jule Styne (1905–1994)

High Button Shoes (1947)
Gentlemen Prefer Blonds (1949); also a 1953 film
Two on the Aisle (1951)
Hazel Flagg (1953)
Peter Pan (1954); music mostly by Mark Charlap
Bells Are Ringing (1956)
Ruggles of Red Gap (1957); television musical
A Party with Betty Comden and Adolph Green (1958); music also by Leonard Bernstein, André Previn, Saul Chaplin, Roger Edens
Say, Darling (1958)
Gypsy (1959); also a 1962 film
Do Re Mi (1960)
Subways Are For Sleeping (1961)
Mister Magoo's Christmas Carol (1962); television musical
Funny Girl (1964); also a 1968 film
Wonderworld (1964)
Fade Out - Fade In (1964)
The Dangerous Christmas of Red Riding Hood (1965); television musical
Hallelujah, Baby! (1967)
Darling of the Day (1968)
Look to the Lilies (1970)
Prettybelle (1971)
Sugar (1972)
Lorelei (1974)
Bar Mitzvah Boy (1978)
One Night Stand (1980)
Pieces of Eight (1985)
Some Like It Hot (1992)
The Red Shoes (1993)

- Marshall Such

Radio! the Musical (2002); music also by Stephen Taylor

- Dana Suesse (1909–1987)

Crazy with the Heat (1941); music also by Irvin Graham, Rudi Revil

- Arthur Sullivan (1842–1900)

The Hot Mikado (1939)
Hollywood Pinafore (1945)
The Black Mikado (1975)
Hot Mikado (1995); music adapted by Rob Bowman
Pinafore! (2001)

- Henry Sullivan (1895–1975)

Murray Anderson's Almanac (1929); music also by Milton Ager
Thumbs Up! (1934); music also by James F. Hanley

- Sam Sutherland

Giant Killer Shark: The Musical (2006); music also by Graham Losee, Aaron Zorgel

- Eric Svejcar

Caligula (2004)

- Karel Svoboda (1938–2007)

Dracula (1995)
Monte Cristo (2000)
Golem (2006)

- Milan Svoboda (born 1951)

Pěna dní (1994)

- Elizabeth Swados (1951–2016)

Nightclub Cantata (1977)
Runaways (1978)
Dispatches (1979)
Alice in Concert (1980)
The Haggadah, a Passover Cantata (1980)
Lullabye and Goodnight (1982)
Doonesbury (1983)
Rap Master Ronnie (1984)
The Red Sneaks (1989)
Jonah (1990)
Groundhog (1992)

- Donald Swann (1923–1994)

At the Drop of a Hat (1956)
At the Drop of Another Hat (1963)

- Phillip Swann (born 1960)

Play It Cool (2011); music also by others

- Kay Swift (1897–1994)

Fine and Dandy (1930)

== T ==
- Howard Talbot (1865–1928)

Wapping Old Stairs (1894)
Monte Carlo (1896)
A Chinese Honeymoon (1899)
Miss Wingrove (1905)
The White Chrysanthemum (1905)
The Girl Behind the Counter (1906)
The Three Kisses (1907)
The Belle of Brittany (1908)
The Arcadians (1909); music also by Lionel Monckton
The Mousmé (1911); music also by Lionel Monckton
The Pearl Girl (1913)
A Milled Grill (1914)
My Lady Frayle (1916)
Mr. Manhattan (1916)
The Light Blues (1916)
The Boy (1917); music also by Lionel Monckton
Who's Hooper? (1919)
My Nieces (1921)

- Shoichi Tama

Bleach (2005)

- Albert M. Tapper

Imperfect Chemistry (2000)
Sessions (2009)

- Douglas Tappin

I Dream (2010)

- Paul Taranto

Evangeline (1998)

- Alan C. Taylor, MD

Emergency Room (1994)

- Bernard J. Taylor (born 1944)

Neighbors and Lovers (1987)
Wuthering Heights (1991)
Success! (1993)
Pride and Prejudice (1994)
Nosferatu the Vampire (1994)
Much Ado (1996)
Liberty! The Siege of the Alamo (2000)

- James Taylor (born 1948)

Working (1978); music also by Stephen Schwartz, Mary Rodgers, Craig Carnelia, Micki Grant

- Jeremy Taylor (born 1937)

Wait a Minim! (1962)

- John Taylor

Charlie Girl (1965); music also by David Heneker
The Biograph Girl (1980); music also by David Heneker

- Raymond Taylor

Almost Crazy (1955); music also by James Shelton, Portia Nelson

- Stephen Taylor

Radio! The Musical (2002); music also by Marshall Such

- Pyotr Ilyich Tchaikovsky (1840–1893)

Music in My Heart (1947)

- Diane Tell (born 1958)

Marilyn Montreuil (1991)

- Bob Telson (born 1949)

The Gospel at Colonus (1983)
Chronicle of a Death Foretold (1995)

- Neil Tennant (born 1954) (member of Pet Shop Boys)

Closer to Heaven (2001); music also by Chris Lowe

- Jeanine Tesori (born 1961)

Violet (1997)
Thoroughly Modern Millie (2000); music also by others
Caroline, or Change (2003)
Shrek (2008)
Fun Home (2013)

- Adolph Thenstead

Caribbean Carnival (1947); music also by Samuel L. Manning

- Cathy Thomas

I Don<3 U Ne Mor (2010); music also by Frank Grullon

- Edward Thomas (born 1924)

Mata Hari (1967)
Ballad for a Firing Squad (1968)
Six Wives (1992)

- Hugh Thomas

Hard Times (2000); music also by Christopher Tookey

- Keith Thomas

Alice through the Looking Glass (1994)

- Richard Thomas (born 1964)

Jerry Springer: The Opera (2003); music also by Stewart Lee

- Keith Thompson

Kooky Tunes (1998)

- Eric Thoroman

Love Lemmings (1991)

- Þorvaldur Þorvaldsson

Ávaxtakafan (1998)

- Penelope Thwaites (born 1944)

Ride! Ride! (1976)

- Harry Tierney (1890–1965)

Keep Smiling (1913)
Irene (1919); music also by others, 1973 revival with music also by Charles Gaynor
The Broadway Whirl (1921)
Up she Goes (1922)
Glory (1922)
Kid Boots (1923)
Rio Rita (1927)
Cross My Heart (1928)

- Thomas Tierney (born 1942)

Eleanor – an American Love Story (1987)

- Paul Tietjens (1877–1943)

The Wizard of Oz (1902); music also by A. Baldwin Sloane and others

- Herman Timberg (1892–1952)

The Show of Wonders (1916); music also by Sigmund Romberg, Otto Motzan
Doing Our Bit (1917); music also by Sigmund Romberg
Tick-tack-toe (1920)

- Charles Tobias (1898–1970)

Hellzapoppin' (1938); music also by Sammy Fain
Yokel Boy (1939); music also by Lew Brown, Sam H. Stept

- Shunichi Tokura (born 1948)

Out of the Blue (1994)

- Christopher Tookey (born 1950)

Hard Times (2000); music also by Hugh Thomas

- Frank E. Tours (1877–1963)

The Dairymaids (1907); music also by Paul Rubens and others
La Belle Paree (1911); music also by Jerome Kern
Nuts and Wine (1914); music also by Melville Gideon

- Allen Toussaint (1938–2015)

Staggerlee (1987)

- Pete Townshend (born 1945)

The Who's Tommy (1979)
The Boy Who Heard Music (2007); music also by Rachel Fuller

- Peter Tranchell (1922–1993)

Zuleika (1954)

- Stephen Trask (born 1967)

Hedwig and the Angry Inch (1998); also a 2001 film

- Armando Trovaioli (1917–2013)

Rugantino (1962)
Ciao, Rudy (1966)
Aggiungi un posto a tavola (1974)
Accendiamo la lampada (1979)
Bravo! (1981)

- Tony Troy

The Flute Player's Song (1999)

- Joseph Tunbridge (1886–1961)

For the Love of Mike (1931); music also by Jack Waller

== U ==
- Georges Ulmer (1919–1989)

Folies Bergère of 1964 (1964); music also by Henri Betti

- Björn Ulvaeus (born 1945)

Abbacadabra (1983); music also by Benny Andersson
Chess (1984); music also by Benny Andersson
Kristina från Duvemåla (1995); music also by Benny Andersson
Mamma Mia! (1999); music also by Benny Andersson; also a 2008 film

- Franklin Underwood

Lovely Ladies, Kind Gentlemen (1970); music also by Stan Freeman

- Steve Underwood

Radical Radio (1995); music also by Jerry Sanders, Karmo Sanders

- Boris Urbánek (born 1961)

Mrazík: Pohádkový Muzikál na Ledě (1998); music also by Nikolai Budaškin

- Jacques Urbont

All in Love (1961)
Rumpelstiltskin (1965)

== V ==
- James Valcq (born 1963)

Zombies from The Beyond (1995)
The Spitfire Grill (2001)

- Carlos Valdes

Me and My Dick (2009); music also by A.J. Holmes, Darren Criss

- Michael Valenti (born 1942)

Snow White and the Seven Dwarfs (1965)
Blood Red Roses (1970)
Beauty and the Beast (1972)
Lovesong (1976)
Honky Tonk Nights (1980)
Oh, Brother! (1981)
In Search of a Musical (1993)

- Frederico Valério (1913–1982)

Hit the Trail (1954)

- François Valéry (born 1954)

L'ombre d'un géant (2001)

- Darren Vallier

A Ring of Roses (1996)

- Johan van den Ende

Sneeuwwitje (1998)

- Ad van Dijk (born 1959)

Tam Tam (1982)
Verdraaid (1990)
Cyrano de Musical (1992)
Joe de Musical (1997)
Rex (2001)
De Vliegende Hollander (2004)

- Jimmy Van Heusen (1913–1990)

Swingin' the Dream (1939)
Nellie Bly (1946)
Carnival in Flanders (1953)
Les Poupées de Paris (1964)
Skyscraper (1965)
Walking Happy (1966)
Thoroughly Modern Millie (1967 film); music also by Elmer Bernstein and others; title song used in the 2002 Broadway musical

- Melvin Van Peebles (1932–2021)

Ain't Supposed to Die a Natural Death (1971)
Don't Play Us Cheap (1972)

- Värttinä

The Lord of the Rings (2006); music also by A. R. Rahman

- Georgii Vasilyev (born 1957)

Nord-Ost (2001); music also by Aleksei Ivaschenko

- Giuseppe Verdi (1813–1901)

My Darlin' Aida (1952)

- Jan Verheyen

Alladin de Musical (2002); music also by Ralph Samantha

- S. Vetkin

Strider: The Story of a Horse (1979); music also by Mark Razovsky, Norman L. Berman

- Valerie Vigoda

Striking 12 (2006); music also by Gene Lewin, Brendan Milburn

- Heitor Villa-Lobos (1887–1959)

Magdalena (1948); music adapted by Robert Wright, George Forrest

- Albert T. Viola

Head over Heels (1981)

- Hans Vollarth

Holmes! (2000)

- Rob Volpintesta

America the Beautiful (1994)

- David Vos

Something's Afoot (1976); music also by James McDonald, Robert Gerlach

== W ==
- Jeree Wade

Shades of Harlem (1983); music also by Frank Owens, Ty Stephens, Branice McKenzie

- Lee Wainer (1904–1979)

Sing for Your Supper (1939); music also by Ned Lehac
New Faces of 1943 (1942)

- Tom Waits (born 1949)

The Black Rider (1990)
Alice (1992)

- Stanley Walden (born 1932); member of The Open Window

Oh! Calcutta! (1969); music also by Peter Schickele, Robert Dennis

- Robert Waldman (born 1936)

Here's Where I Belong (1968)
The Robber Bridegroom (1975)

- Don Walker (1907–1989)

Allah Be Praised! (1944); music also by Baldwin Bergersen
Memphis Bound! (1945); music also by Clay Warnick
Courtin' Time (1951); music also by Jack Lawrence

- Michael Patrick Walker (born 1971)

Altar Boyz (2005); music also by Gary Adler

- Steven Luke Walker

Blaze (2007)

- John Trent Wallace (born 1966)

The Hunchback of Notre Dame (1996)

- Jack Waller (1885–1957)

For the Love of Mike (1931); music also by Joseph Tunbridge

- Fats Waller (1904–1943)

Early to Bed (1943)
Ain't Misbehavin' (1978)

- Ruth Wallis (1920–2007)

Boobs! The Musical: The World According to Ruth Wallis (2003)

- Kevin Walsh

Clarinda (2008)

- Nathan Wang (born 1956)

Imelda (2009)

- Jim Wann (born 1948)

Hot Grog (1977); music also by Bland Simpson
Pump Boys and Dinettes (1981); music also by others
King Mackerel (1996)

- Stephen Warbeck (born 1953)

The Villains' Opera (2000); after John Gay's The Beggar's Opera
The Grave White Way (2001)
Judy's Scary Little Christmas (2002)

- Matthew Ward

After the Fair (1999)

- Michael Ward

Personals (1980)
Genesis: Music and Miracles (1988)

- Trisha Ward (born 1972)

Street of Dreams (2012)

- Gerry Ware

Ripper The Musical (2007); music also by Matthew Pritchard

- Russell Warner

People in Show Business Make Long Goodbyes (1979)

- Clay Warnick (1915–1995)

Dream with Music (1944)
Memphis Bound! (1945); music also by Don Walker
The Adventures of Marco Polo (1956); original television play

- Harry Warren (1893–1981)

Paris (1928); music also by Cole Porter, Walter Kollo, Louis Alter, Fred E. Ahlert
Crazy Quilt (1931)
The Laugh Parade (1931)
Shangri-La (1956)
42nd Street (1980)

- Kerry Michael Warren

Dracul (1995)

- Rod Warren

Below the Belt (1966)

- Scott Warrender

Das Barbecü (1991)

- Daryl Waters

Bring in 'Da Noise, Bring in 'Da Funk (1995); music also by Ann Duquesnay, Zane Mark
Harlem Song (2002); music also by Zane Mark

- Jeff Wayne (born 1943)

Two Cities (1969)
The War of the Worlds (1975)
Spatacus (1992)

- Bill Weeden (born 1940)

Hurry, Harry (1972)

- Kurt Weill (1900–1950)

The Threepenny Opera (1928)
Happy End (1929)
The Silver Lake: a Winter's Fairy Tale (1933)
A Kingdom for a Cow (Der Kuhhandel) (1935)
Johnny Johnson (1936)
Knickerbocker Holiday (1938)
Lady in the Dark (1941)
One Touch of Venus (1943)
The Firebrand of Florence (1945)
Street Scene (1946)
Love Life (1948); ballet music by Irving Schlein
Lost in the Stars (1949)
A Kurt Weill Cabaret (1963)
Berlin to Broadway with Kurt Weill (1972)
Nashville, New York (1979); music also by Vernon Duke
Three Weill Men (2001)
LoveMusik (2007)

- Tom Wilson Weinberg (born 1945)

Ten Percent Revue (1985)
Get Used to It! (1992)
Sixty Years With Bruhs and Gean (1995)
Eleanor & Hick (1997)
The Teachings of Chairman Rick (2005)
Sunrise at Hyde Park (2013)

- Michael Weiner (b. 1975)

First Date (2012); music also by Alan Zachary
Secondhand Lions (2013); music also by Alan Zachary

- Stephen Weiner

Newyorkers (2001)
Iron Curtain (2006)

- George David Weiss (1921–2010)

Mr. Wonderful (1956); music also by Jerry Bock, Larry Holofcener
First Impressions (1959); music also by Robert Goldman, Glenn Paxton
Maggie Flynn (1968); music also by Luigi Creatore, Hugo Peretti
A Tale of Cinderella (1994); music also by Will Severin

- David Welch

Salon: an Intoxicating New Musical (1998)
Studio (1998)

- Percy Wenrich (1880–1952)

The Crinoline Girl (1914)
The Right Girl (1921)
Castles in the Air (1926)
Who Cares? (1930)

- Glenn Wescott

The Golden Knight (1962)

- Martin Wesley-Smith (1945–2019)

Boojum! (1986)

- Dennis West

Dracula: A Rock Opera (1997); music also by John R. Briggs

- Mike Westbrook (born 1936)

Tyger (1971)

- Harris Wheeler

Blue Plate Special (1983)

- Bill Whelan (born 1950)

Riverdance (1995)

- Ian Whitcomb (1941–2020)

Lotus Land (1992)

- Dan White

Ziegfeld Follies of 1943 (1943); music also by Ray Henderson

- George White (1892–1968)

George White's Scandals of 1929 (1929); music also by Cliff Friend, Ray Henderson

- Maurice White (1941–2016), member of Earth, Wind and Fire

Hot Feet (2006)

- Nancy White

Anne & Gilbert (2005); music also by Jeff Hochhauser, Bob Johnston

- Richard A. Whiting (1891–1938)

Free for All (1931)
Take a Chance (1932); music also by Nacio Herb Brown, Vincent Youmans

- Michael Wild (1931–2018)

Pardon My Prejudice (1957)
Earnestly Yours (1960)
Maggie (1977)
The Six Wives of Henry VIII (1988)
Masquerade
Josephine

- Alec Wilder (1907–1980)

Kittiwake Island (1960)
Clues to a Life (1982); music also by Morty Palitz

- Frank Wildhorn (born 1958)

Jekyll & Hyde (1990)
Svengali (1991)
Victor/Victoria (1995); music also by Henry Mancini
The Scarlet Pimpernel (1997)
The Civil War (1998)
Camille Claudel (2003)
Dracula (2004)
Waiting for the Moon (2005)
Rudolf (2006)
Never Say Goodbye (2006)
Carmen (2008)
Bonnie & Clyde (2009)
The Count of Monte Cristo (2009)
Cyrano de Bergerac (2009)
Wonderland (2009)
Tears of Heaven (2010)
Mitsuko (2011)
Excalibur (2014)
Death Note (2015)
Mata Hari (2016)
The Passage to the Light - The Revolutionary Maximilien Robespierre (2017)
The Man Who Laughs (2018)

- Andrew Wilkie

Tap Dogs (1995)

- Dudley Wilkinson (1897–1991)

Queen o' Hearts (1922); music also by Lewis E. Gensler

- Jill Williams

Rainbow Jones (1974)

- John Williams (born 1932)

Thomas and the King (1975)

- Paul Williams (born 1940)

Phantom of the Paradise (1974); also a 1974 film
The Muppet Christmas Carol (1992)
Bugsy Malone (1997)
Happy Days (2006)

- Timothy Williams (born 1966)

Napoleon (1994)

- Allee Willis (1947–2019)

The Color Purple (2005); music also by Brenda Russell, Stephen Bray

- Phil Willmott (born 1968)

Once Upon a Time at the Adelphi (2008)

- Meredith Willson (1902–1984)

The Music Man (1957); also a 1962 film
The Unsinkable Molly Brown (1960); also a 1964 film
Here's Love (1963)
1491 (1969)

- Brian Wilson (born 1942)

Good Vibrations (2005); music also by The Beach Boys

- Earl Wilson, Jr.

Let My People Come (1974)

- Randal Wilson

Pageant in Exile: "Duel" (1979)

- Sandy Wilson (1924–2014)

The Boy Friend (1953); also a 1971 film
Buccaneer (1953)
Valmouth (1958)
Call It Love (1960)
Divorce Me, Darling! (1964)
His Monkey Wife (1971)
The Clapham Wonder (1978)
Aladdin (1979)

- Marvin Winans (born 1958)

Don't Get God Started (1987)

- Peter Winkler (b. 1943)

Professionally Speaking (1986); music also by Frederic Block, Ernst Muller

- Robert Winterberg (1884–1930)

The Girl from Brazil (1916); music also by Sigmund Romberg
The Lady in Red (1919)

- Jim Wise (1919–2000)

Dames at Sea (1968)

- Judd Woldin (1925–2011)

Railway with a Heart of Gold (1962)
Raisin (1973)
Pettycoat Lane (1978)
Lorenzo (1982)
Tatterdemalion (1985)
Little Ham (1987)
Jonah (1992)
The Prince and the Pauper (1993)

- Tommy Wolf (1925–1979)

The Nervous Set (1959)

- Jacques Wolfe (1896–1973)

John Henry (1940)

- Gary Wong

In Your Dreams (2000)

- David Wood

The Old Man of Lochnager (1986)

- G. Wood

F. Jasmine Addams (1971)

- Victoria Wood (1953–2016)

Acorn Antiques (2005)

- Paul Woodfull (born 1958)

I, Keano (2005)

- Benjamin Wooley

Lumberjacks (2009)

- Guy Woolfenden (1937–2016)

The Comedy of Errors (1976)

- Bill Wray

EFX (1995); music also by others

- Robert Wright (1914–2005)

Song of Norway (1944); music also by George Forrest, adapted from themes of Edvard Grieg; also a 1970 film
Gypsy Lady (1946); music also by George Forrest, adapted from themes of Victor Herbert
Magdalena (1948); music also by George Forrest, adapted from themes of Heitor Villa-Lobos
Kismet (1953); music also by George Forrest, adapted from themes of Alexander Borodin; also a 1955 film
The Love Doctor (1959); music also by George Forrest
Kean (1961); music also by George Forrest
Anya, "Anastasia" (1965); music also by George Forrest, adapted from themes of Sergei Rachmaninov
The Great Waltz (1930); music also by George Forrest, adapted from Johann Strauss II
Timbuktu! (1978); music also by George Forrest
Grand Hotel (1989); music also by George Forrest, Maury Yeston
Anastasia (revision of Anya) (1991); music also by George Forrest, adapted from themes of Sergei Rachmaninov

- Wilfred Wylam (1927–1997)

Houdini: Man of Magic (1966)

- Barry Wyner

Calvin Berger (2006)

- Laurence Mark Wythe (born 1974)

Tomorrow Morning (2006)
Through the Door (2008)

== Y ==
- David Yazbek (born 1960)

The Full Monty (2000)
Dirty Rotten Scoundrels (2004)
Women on the Verge of a Nervous Breakdown (2010)
The Band's Visit (2016)
Tootsie (2019)
Dead Outlaw (2025)

- Gleb Yellin (1898–1983)

Chauve-Souris of 1943 (1943)

- Maury Yeston (born 1945)

Nine (1982); also a 2009 film
One Two Three Four Five (1987)
Goya: A Life In Song (1988)
Grand Hotel (1989); music mostly by Robert Wright, George Forrest
Phantom (1991)
Titanic (1997)
Death Takes a Holiday (2011)

- Douglas Yetter

A Christmas Carol (1992)

- Lam Ming Yeung

Snow.Wolf.Lake (1997); music also by Guo Sai Cheung, Dick Lee, Iskanada Ismail

- Vincent Youmans (1898–1946)

Two Little Girls in Blue (1921); music also by Paul Lannin
Wildflower (1923); music also by Herbert Stothart
Mary Jane McKane (1923); music also by Herbert Stothart
Lollipop (1924)
No, No, Nanette (1925)
Oh, Please! (1926)
Hit the Deck (1927)
Rainbow (1928)
Great Day! (1929)
Smiles (1930)
Through the Years (1931)
Take a Chance (1932); music also by Richard A. Whiting, Nacio Herb Brown

- Victor Young (1899–1956)

Pardon Our French (1950)
Seventh Heaven (1955)

- Virgil Young

Corn (1997)

- Willie Fong Young

American Passion (1983)

== Z ==
- Alan Zachary

First Date (2012); music also by Michael Weiner

- Thomas Zaufke (born 1966)

Schwestern im Geiste (2014)

- William Zeffiro

The Road to Ruin

- Joseph Zellnik

Trust Me (1990)
Silken Cords (1993)
The Uncrowned Queen of Ireland (1993)
City of Dreams (1997)
Yank! A WWII Love Story (2005)

- Victor Ziskin

The Young Abe Lincoln (1961)

- Milan Zítka

Mistr jazzu (2012)

- Emil Dean Zoghby (born 1942)

Catch My Soul (1968); music also by Ray Pohlman

- Aaron Zorgel

Giant Killer Shark: The Musical (2006); music also by Sam Sutherland, Graham Losee

- Charles Zwar (1911–1989)

Blue Mountain Melody (1934)
Swinging the Gate (1940)
Sky High (1942)
Sweetest and Lowest (1946); music also by others
A La Carte (1947)
Bet Your Life (1952); music also by Kenneth Leslie-Smith
At the Lyric (1953)
Marigold (1959)
From A to Z (1960); music also by others
All Square (1963)

== See also ==
- List of musical theatre composers
- Lists of musicals
