= Peter Mills (composer) =

American musical theatre composer and lyricist

- Born: Peter Mills
- Genre: Musical theatre
- Occupations: Composer, songwriter,
- Website: www.petemillsmusic.com

Peter Mills is an American musical theatre composer and lyricist. He won the third Fred Ebb award in 2007.

== Career ==
After graduating from Princeton University with a degree in english/dramatic literature, he then acquired his MFA in musical theatre writing at the New York University's Tisch School of the Arts. He is one of the founding members of Prospect Theater Company, which frequently produces his work.

== Productions ==
---(music, lyrics, & book by Mills unless otherwise noted)---

- Marco Polo, 2000, lyrics & book (music by Deborah Abramson)
- The Flood, 2001, music, lyrics, & book by Mills & Cara Reichel
- Illyria, 2002
- The Alchemists, 2003, book by Mills & Reichel
- Lonely Rhymes, 2004
- The Pursuit of Persephone, 2005, book by Mills & Reichel (reopened as The Underclassman in 2014)
- Iron Curtain 2006, lyrics (music by Stephen Weiner, book by Susan DiLallo)
- The Rockae, 2007, rock musical based on The Bacchae, book by Mills & Reichel
- Honor, 2008, based on As You Like It, music, lyrics, & book by Mills & Cara Reichel
- Golden Boy of the Blue Ridge, 2009, book by Mills & Reichel
- Evergreen, 2009, book by Mills & Reichel
- Death For Five Voices, 2013, book by Mills & Reichel
- The Honeymooners, 2017, based on the television show, lyrics (music by Stephen Weiner, book by Dusty Kay and Bill Nuss)
- The Hello Girls, 2018, book by Mills & Reichel

== Personal life ==
Mills is married to Cara Reichel, whom he met while at Princeton. They started the Prospect Theater Company soon after, and she is his frequent collaborator.

== Awards and nominations ==
- 2002 -- Jonathan Larson Performing Arts Foundation grant
- 2003 -- ASCAP Foundation Richard Rodgers New Horizons Award
- 2006 -- Drama Desk Award nomination -- The Pursuit of Persephone (Music & orchestrations)
- 2007—Fred Ebb Award
- 2010—Kleban Prize for Musical Theatre lyrics
- 2014—Donna Perret Rosen Award
