= White Noise: A Cautionary Musical =

2006 American stage musical

- Logo from the Chicago Production
- Music: Robert Morris; Steven Morris; Joe Shane
- Lyrics: Robert Morris; Steven Morris; Joe Shane

White Noise: A Cautionary Musical is a musical about a white supremacist rock duo. Created by Ryan J. Davis, the show was directed by Sergio Trujillo and produced by Whoopi Goldberg. The music and lyrics were written by Robert Morris, Steven Morris, and Joe Shane, based upon the book White Noise by Matte O'Brien.

This musical is a satire that was inspired by the true story of Prussian Blue, a Neo-Nazi folk duo that gained a following singing songs with undertones of their racist ideology. It seeks to draw attention to the lyrical content found in the contemporary music industry and the individual's responsibility to critically listen to and evaluate musical selections.

== History ==
The production first played in 2006 at the New York Musical Theatre Festival with music by Joe Drymala and directed by Ryan J. Davis. The show underwent a considerable change after Davis conceived and presented it at the 2006 New York Musical Theatre Festival. The 2006 show featured music by Joe Drymala and songs by seven other writers.

It was then presented in 2009 as a full-scale musical with the ultimate creative team onstage at the Le Petit Theatre on Jackson Square in the French Quarter of New Orleans.

Trujillo, who previously worked as the choreographer of Memphis, Jersey Boys, and The Addams Family, was not involved in the show prior to 2009. He stated that he did not expect such a "risky" project to be his first show as a director. At the show's inception, the musical's creators began receiving hate mail from White Supremacy groups.

Goldberg joined the production as a producer after its critical success in New Orleans. "After hearing from a variety of different folks who had seen the production in New Orleans, I read the script and listened to the music. I knew this was a show I needed to be a part of. White Noise smacks you in a challenging, emotional and entertaining way and explores social issues in a way I don't remember ever seeing before on a stage."

On April 8, 2011, the musical was retooled and remounted as a shortened version that became a 100-minute one act production at the Royal George Theatre in Chicago, Illinois, where it played until May 15, 2011.

== Synopsis ==
White Noise follows a top-selling music producer controversy by turning talented, white supremacist artists into big stars. Steadily baited by fame and power, two diametrically opposed groups – a pop band that churns out catchy tunes of coded rhetoric and a hip-hop-turned-gangster rap duo – meet at the top of the charts and collide with consequence.

== Musical numbers ==
- "Welcome to Eden" – Eva, Ensemble
- "Life, Liberty & Happiness" – Dion, Tyler
- "Big Bang" – Eva, Eden, Duke
- "Mexican Vacation" – Eva, Eden, Duke
- "Welcome to Eden Reprise" – Eva, Eden, Duke, Ensemble
- "N.G.S" – Dion, Tyler
- "Live for the Kill" – Max, Jake
- "W.T.F." – Eden, Eva, Duke, Jake, Ensemble
- "Love Stories" – Eva, Eden, Ensemble
- "Mondays Suck" – Eva, Eden, Duke, Jake, Ensemble
- "Not Your Enemy" – Laurel, Eva, Eden
- "Showtime"- Dion, Tyler, Ensemble
- "Hip-Hop Country" – Dion, Tyler, Ensemble
- "City on a Hill" – Eva, Eden, Dion, Tyler, Duke, Ensemble
- "Life Around" – Jake, Eden
- "Mondays Suck Reprise" – Eva, Eden, Duke, Ensemble
- "Master Race" – Duke, Dion
- "Fine" – Tyler, Laurel, Jake, Eva, Ensemble
- "I am America" – Eva, Company

== Principal characters ==
- Max
- Eva
- Eden
- Jake
- Dion
- Tyler
- Duke
- Laurel

== Productions ==
- 2011 Chicago Royal George Theatre
- 2009 New Orleans
- 2006 New York Musical Theatre Festival
