= The Golden Screw =

Tom Sankey sings the songs from The Golden Screw

Cast recording by Tom Sankey
- Released: 1967
- Recorded: 1967
- Genre: Folk
- Label: Atco

The Golden Screw was an Off-Off-Broadway folk rock musical written and performed by Tom Sankey which premiered at the Theatre Genesis in September 1966. It ran again from January 30, 1967 to March 5, 1967 at the Provincetown Playhouse in Greenwich Village. The show's cast album was the first rock theatrical recording of its kind. The play follows a Bob Dylanesque singer figure from folk music roots to commercialization. A subsequent production was mounted at Toronto's Global Village Theatre in 1972. Directed by Sankey, the cast included Elan Ross Gibson, Francois Regis-Klanfer and Yank Azman with music by Larry Wells (piano) and Fergus Hambleton, (guitar.)

== Play ==
The play was directed by David Eliscu, produced by Paul Stoudt, and the cast included: Tom Sankey, Janet Day, Patrick Sullivan and Murray Paskin. The musicians were Tom Sankey (autoharp), Jack Hopper (guitar) and members of The Inner Sanctum: Kevin Michael (lead guitar), Gerry Michael (drums), Vince Taggart (rhythm guitar). The script was published as The Golden Screw, Or That's Your Thing, Baby (1968).

== Track listing ==
1. Bad Girl
2. New Evaline
3. You Won't Say No
4. The Beautiful People
5. I Heard My Mother Crying
6. I Can't Make It Anymore
7. Jesus Come Down
8. 2000 Miles
9. Trip Tick Talking Blues
10. Can I Touch You
11. That's Your Thing, Baby
12. I Can't Remember
13. Bottom End of Bleecher Street
14. Flippin' Out - Little White Dog

== See also ==
- Hair (musical) The Golden Screw opened nine months before Hair.
