= Otto Motzan =

Otto Motzan (12 April 1880 – 15 January 1937 (Note: Early 20th century source such as this refers to Otto Motzan's death as 14 January 1937.)) was an American composer from Austria-Hungary. He was best known as one of the composers for The Passing Show of 1916. He became a popular composer and eventually published his own works through Joseph W. Stern & Co., as well as becoming a chartered member of the American Society of Composers, Authors and Publishers since 1914, the year of its inception. A possible pseudonym of Otto Motzan is Josie De Guzman.
