= Iron Curtain (musical) =

Iron Curtain is a comedy musical about the Soviet Union, with music by Stephen Weiner, lyrics by Peter Mills, and a book by Susan DiLallo.

== Story ==
The musical follows Murray and Howard, an unsuccessful musical writing team, as they attempt to write a great musical. However, all of their ideas are taken. Meanwhile, Nikita Khrushchev, the Russian Premier, is becoming tired of the horrible musicals being produced by writers in the Soviet Union. He assigns Yevgenyi Onanov to create a propaganda musical, promoting Communism and working for the glory of Russia. However, the musical that Onanov creates, a bad rip-off of Oklahoma!, is terrible. Khrushchev tells Onanov to fix it, or his demise may be imminent. He also assigns Shmearnov to the problem, with the same consequences for failure. The pair kidnaps Murray and Howard to fix the musical. They are brought behind the Iron Curtain, and they begin work on the musical with the help of a crazy cast of characters.

Other characters include:

- Shirley Dooley - Howard's not-quite girlfriend, who literally follows him to the ends of the earth.
- Sergei Shmearnov - A overbearing KGB agent with an agenda of his own.
- Yevgenyi Onanov - A Soviet producer working for the ministry of musical persuasion.
- Hildret Heintz - An East German director with a sadistic bend to her.
- Masha Petrovna Haylukmikova - A Russian chorus girl with an eye for Murray.

The Ensemble portrays the remainder of the small characters, which manages to be a large part of the show.

== Production ==
The musical's off-Broadway premiere featured Marcus Neville as Howard, Jeff Edgerton as Murray, and Jessica Grové as Masha. The rest of the cast included Bethe B. Austin, Larry Brustofski, Maria Couch, Amber Dow, Dominic Roberts (replaced David Miller), Dara Seitzman, Doug Shapiro, Robby Sharpe, Rich Silverstein, Gordon Stanley, Brad York.
