= Ryan J. Davis =

American theatre director

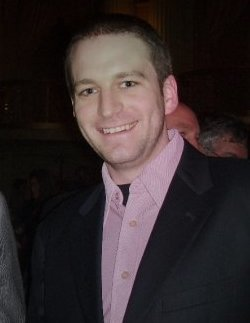
- Born: April 4, 1982 (age 44); Salisbury, Maryland, U.S.
- Occupations: Theatre director, writer, activist

Ryan J. Davis (born April 4, 1982, in Salisbury, Maryland) is an American theater director, writer, political consultant, and progressive activist. In 2006, a musical he conceived, White Noise received positive reviews and was featured on Good Morning America and ABC Primetime Live. In 2007 Davis' satirical attack ad against Rudy Giuliani, "Gays For Giuliani," received media attention from CNN, MSNBC, and a feature in The Washington Post. He is a contributing writer for The Huffington Post and The Hill, and writes for his blog, Ryan J. Davis Blogs.

== Early life ==
As a teenager Davis was a young conservative and at fifteen founded a conservative youth website called "The Conservative Teen E-Zine." The site attracted local media attention and helped him become the Student Council President at Salisbury Christian High School. At sixteen he was given an award for his years of service to the Catholic Church as an Altar Server by Bishop Saltarelli. In 1999, at seventeen, he was John McCain's Maryland State Youth Coordinator, working largely on the Internet organizing voters.

== Theatre ==
Ryan moved to New York in 2000 and began working in the theater. His first New York credit was as Assistant Stage Manager on The Storm Theatre's production of Gillette starring NFL Hall Of Famer John Riggins. He continued to work in indie theatre with The Storm Theatre and companies like NativeAliens, The Chip Deffaa Festival, and co-founding his own Conspiracy Theatre Company.

In 2004, returning to the theatre after sixteen months in politics, Davis directed a "sensational production" of Hedwig and the Angry Inch in Rochester, New York.

=== Big Tent: The Tammy Faye Musical ===
In May 2007 Davis directed a concert version of Big Tent: The Tammy Faye Bakker, at Off-Broadway's New World Stages, in New York City. The show features music and lyrics by Ben Cohn, Sean McDaniel, and a book by Jeffery Self. A star-studded concert of songs from the show is scheduled for February 2008 at New York's Metropolitan Room.

=== My Life on the Craigslist ===
In November 2007, Davis directed Jeffery Self in My Life on the Craigslist at Off-Broadway's New World Stages. The show focuses on a young gay man's sexual experiences on Craigslist.

=== White Noise: A Cautionary Musical ===
In May 2006, Davis and Joe Drymala premiered their new musical White Noise at a pair of sold-out readings in Midtown Manhattan. The musical, inspired by the Nazi-Pop Duo Prussian Blue, was a media hit and was featured on Good Morning America and ABC Primetime Live.

White Noise was invited to participate in the 2006 New York Musical Theatre Festival. The show played to packed houses and was given a NYMF Award Of Excellence Honorable Mention for its score and named one of Talkin' Broadway's Best Shows of 2006.

Davis talked of threats the creative team received during the production in interviews with Radar magazine and Broadway World. In the interview on Broadway World, Davis said; "We get hate mail. We get talked about on the hate message boards. I feel like I’m doing something right in life if white supremacists hate me; I'd be doing something wrong if they were fans."

=== Mr. Broadway Beauty of 2008 ===
The original Rent star Anthony Rapp has been announced as the host of the 2nd Annual Broadway Beauty Pageant set for Monday evening, April 28, 2008, 8 p.m. at New World Stages (340 West 50th St.). The event will mark the annual fundraising benefit for the Ali Forney Center (AFC).

Formerly titled "Mr. Broadway"—the name of the charitable event was changed due to potential trademark infringement (a point that is not conceded)—the evening will feature male cast members representing their respective Broadway shows. Contestants include Tommy Berklund, Mr. A Chorus Line; Austin Eyer, Mr. Curtains; Joe Komara, Mr. Grease; Daniel Robinson, Mr. Hairspray; and Marty Thomas, Mr. Xanadu. Contestants will compete for the title crown through talent, interview and swimsuit competitions. Crowning the winner will be special guest Michael Riedel of the New York Post.

Each of the contestants will go head to head in front of a panel of celebrity judges, but ultimately, the final vote is in the hands of the audience. The judges are Seth Rudetsky (Rhapsody in Seth, Chatterbox, The Ritz), Hunter Bell, and Susan Blackwell.

The Broadway Beauty Pageant of 2008 is written and conceived by Jeffery Self and directed by Davis, with musical direction by Jack Aaronson. The pageant includes original songs by Lisa Lambert (Tony Award-winner for The Drowsy Chaperone), Glen Kelly (The Producers, The Drowsy Chaperone) and Eric Svejcar (Caligula). The evening is produced by Davis and Jeffery Self in association with Tim Hur.

AFC was started in June 2002 in response to the lack of safe shelter for LGBT youth in New York City. They are committed to providing LGBT youth with safe, dignified, nurturing environments where their needs can be met and where they can begin to put their lives back together. The center provides short- and long-term housing in Manhattan and Brooklyn, plus free medical care, HIV testing, mental health services, showers, food, computer access and job training and placement at its drop-in center in Chelsea. AFC is also dedicated to promoting awareness of the plight of homeless LGBT youth in the United States with the goal of generating responses on local and national levels from government funders, foundations and the LGBT community.

== Politics and activism ==
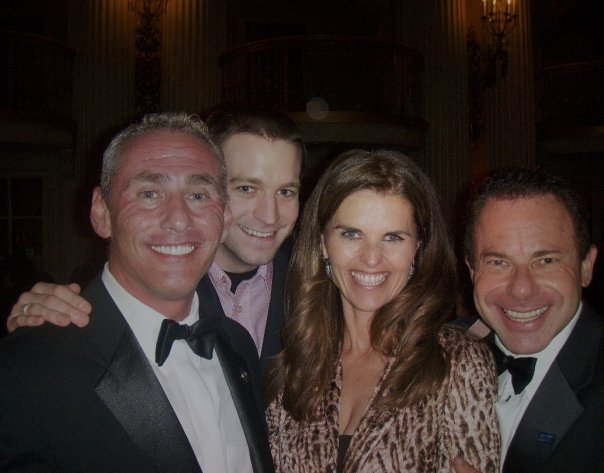
Don Norte, Ryan J. Davis, Maria Shriver, and Kevin Norte on February 21, 2008, in Los Angeles, California.

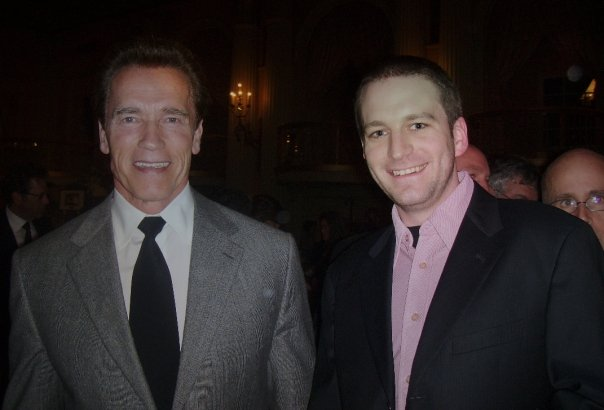
Governor Arnold Schwarzenegger and Ryan J. Davis on February 21, 2008, in Los Angeles, California.

In 2003, Davis joined Howard Dean's Presidential campaign and along with Zephyr Teachout and David Welch traveled to over thirty-five states on a grassroots tour of America, called The Drive For Democracy. Davis worked on the Dean Campaign in New Media, taking pictures and blogging about the tour. In the CNN Documentary on the Dean Campaign, True Believers, Davis describes how he came to be a part of the campaign; "I packed up all my stuff. I rented a car. And I drove up here."

After Dean's primary defeat, Ryan returned to Salisbury, Maryland to serve as Campaign Manager on Chesapeake City Town Councilman Harry Sampson's unsuccessful campaign for Congress in Maryland's First District. Davis managed to get Harry Sampson the only newspaper endorsement of the primary and a mention in Wired Magazine for the campaign's innovative use of internet fundraising.

After returning to New York City, Ryan began blogging at NotGeniuses, along with Joe Rospars and Ezra Klein. It was during this time that he broke the story of the unfair expulsion of James Barnett. Soon Barnett's situation was picked up by both the mainstream and gay focused press, with national organizations such as the Human Rights Council discussing his situation with Bill O'Reilly.

== Gays For Giuliani ==
In August 2007, Davis produced and directed Gays For Giuliani, a satirical attack ad against former NYC Mayor and Presidential hopeful Rudy Giuliani. The Advocate said that Davis was "a tangible influence on the presidential primary race." He did receive criticism in a Fox News interview from Patrick Sammon, President of Log Cabin Republicans, who said "I was surprised to hear that this video had been produced by a gay person. I'm just confused as to someone who, as an advocate for gay rights, would use a video to kind of spread stereotypes of gay people." The ad was seen by millions of people when Mr. Davis was interviewed on CNN's The Situation Room, MSNBC, and a feature in The Washington Post. Davis responded to his critics in a front page interview in Gay City News: "It wasn't in the best taste in ads in this election cycle, but would those liberals like to see Giuliani as president? This is a war. We're at war." This resulted in a blog war between Davis and Log Cabin Republicans bloggers but it resulted in Davis and some of the Log Cabin Bloggers in developing mutual respect and admiration for their opposing views towards political activism but found a core connection related to GLBT rights.

== Bad Boy Blogger and the coalition led by Log Cabin Republicans leaders ==
Davis was deemed "The Bad Boy Blogger" in blogs by the Log Cabin Republicans' Kevin Norte, but in February 2008, Davis flew out to Hollywood to join a coalition of gay activists to lobby Governor Arnold Schwarzenegger and First Lady Maria Shriver to publicly oppose the Family Research Council's anti-gay marriage initiative.

On April 11, 2008, Governor Schwarzenegger came out officially against the initiative at LCR's National Convention.
