= Success! =

Musical by Bernard J. Taylor

Success! is a musical by Bernard J. Taylor that was first recorded in 1993 as a studio concept album featuring various West End performers including Lon Satton (who created the role of Poppa in Andrew Lloyd Webber's Starlight Express), Claire Moore, Kathryn Evans, Jessica Martin and Maurice Clarke. It had its world premiere stage production in Rotherham, Yorkshire, in 1995.

Following are extracts of some of the reviews:

"Great writers of stage music have always proved themselves to be versatile. In the light of the favourable reaction it received it would have been more than easy for Taylor to follow Wuthering Heights with another show in that same grand scale, but instead he quickly showed his credentials by heading in a totally different direction and in doing so comes up with another admirable piece of work. "Success!" is full of splendid material and is loads of fun." - Mike Gibb, Masquerade, Issue 13, 1993

"An adaptation of the Faust legend, I enjoyed this one very much, and it has some bright, breezy and catchy numbers. I will be surprised if anyone who buys it is disappointed with the standard of the songs." - Terry Wardrope, Words and Music, Issue 17, January 1994.

"Taylor's score has several attractive songs . . . They're all sung as if they are the hottest songs to come from the West End." - Show Music, USA, autumn 1993 edition.
