= Giant Killer Shark: The Musical =

- Giant Killer Shark promotional poster
- Music: Sam Sutherland; Graham Losee; Aaron Zorgel
- Lyrics: Sam Sutherland
- Book: Sam Sutherland
- Basis: 1975 film Jaws
- Productions: 2008 New York City; 2007 Winnipeg; 2007 Toronto; 2006 Toronto; 2006, Toronto Fringe Festival

Giant Killer Shark: The Musical is a musical composed by Canadian musician Sam Sutherland. At both the Toronto and Winnipeg Fringe Festival, Giant Killer Shark was named the Best of the Fest, being awarded a five star rating.

The meta-musical is based on the 1975 movie Jaws. Sam Sutherland states in a blog: "we decided to forgo the lengthy legal process of securing the rights to the source material by merely avoiding any direct reference to it. Set on a Copyright-Protected Island, [the] play features concerned citizens, a nameless mayor, and at least one Insolent Fisherman. All the action unfolds to a pop-punk soundtrack that owes as much to mid-90s Fat Wreck Chords bands as it does Andrew Lloyd Webber. There's also hardcore for the shark attacks, rapping for the autopsy (where else should rap take place?) and triumphant power-pop for the shark-killing finale."

The original cast of Giant Killer Shark features three main characters: a Crazy Old Fisherman (played by Aaron Zorgel), a Grizzled New York City Cop (played by Graham Losee), and a Hippie Scientist (played by writer Sam Sutherland). Throughout the play, numerous fringe characters make an appearance, mainly played by Aaron, Graham and Sam, when not appearing on-stage as their main characters.

Giant Killer Shark is managed by Ashley Carter and directed by Amy Duncan.

Giant Killer Shark: The Musical has received a rating of four out of a possible 5 bars from CBC, as well as perfect ratings of 5 stars from both the Toronto Fringe Festival and Winnipeg Fringe Festival.

The show did its final run at the New York Musical Theatre Festival in the fall of 2008, with its final performance staged at the Tranzac in Toronto on October 18, 2008.

== Musical numbers ==
2006

- "Totally Sexy Nudie Swim Party!"
- "Livin' On A Copyright-Protected Island"
- "Lookin' For (Beach) Closure"
- "Fourth Of July"
- "Big Sexy American Beach Party!"
- "Shark Attack!"
- "100% Autopsy Dance Party!"
- "Interlude"
- "What Are We Gonna Do?"
- "Ska Fishing"
- "Bondin' An' Boozin'"
- "Shark Attack Reprise!"
- "Balls, I'm Dead"
- "The Only Good Shark Is A Dead Shark"

2007

- "Super Awesome Magic Show Party! (Montage)"
