= Christopher Tookey =

British film critic

Christopher Tookey (born 9 April 1950) is an English film critic who has written for both The Sunday Telegraph and the Daily Mail. He has also presented the Radio 4 programmes The Film Programme and Back Row. In 2013, he won the Arts Reviewer of the Year award from the London Press Club.

At Oxford University he was president of the Oxford Union, Editor of Isis, President of the Etceteras and Musical Director of Oxford Theatre Group. In April 1973 he was one of three beneficiaries of the ITV Repertory Theatre Trainee Director Scheme, starting his career at the Belgrade Theatre, Coventry later that year.

Tookey was elected chairman of The Critics' Circle in 1995, but his bid to become vice-president floundered due to the position he took on the 1996 film Crash. Tookey campaigned for the film to be banned, writing that "Crash is the point at which even a liberal society should draw the line." The Observer film critic Philip French wrote that Tookey's "campaigning was thought to be in breach of the Critics' Circle's objects of promoting the art of criticism and supporting the advancement of the arts." Tookey wrote a series of critical articles for the Mail regarding the film which saw Jonathan Coe of the New Statesman describe him as "the real architect of the antiCrash campaign". Tookey called for readers to boycott the products of distributor Sony, and questioned the suitability to the role of the then director of the British Board of Film Classification. Tookey denied charges that he was in favour of blanket censorship, writing in a letter to The Guardian that he has "frequently written and spoken against censorship and jumped to the defence of films (such as Pulp Fiction, Reservoir Dogs and The Life Of Brian) which struck me as victims of unjust repression in the past." He wrote in an article for Prospect magazine that his campaign against Crash was motivated by the fear that "Cronenberg's film might well have a "copycat effect" on a few unstable individuals" and could "also have a far more insidious longterm effect by eroticising sado-masochism and orthopaedic fetishism for people previously unaware of being turned on by acts of mutilation." Tookey was also concerned at the precedent set by releasing such a film with an 18 certificate.

In 2000 Tookey directed and co-produced the musical Hard Times, based on the Charles Dickens novel of the same name, which opened to mixed reviews at the Theatre Royal, Haymarket and closed the same year.

Tookey also witnessed a man bleed to death from a stabbing in 1997, and his reaction troubled him: "It has brought home to me that I have seen so much violence on screen (the latest film is Crash) that I have become desensitised. Talking with the others on the street, I was noticeably less affected by the sight of this guy bleeding to death. After the killing, a number of people had nightmares. Shouldn't I have? It was my lack of reaction that was so chilling."

In August 2013 the Daily Mail decided not to renew Tookey's contract which expired on 1 December 2013.

== Publications ==
- The Critics' Film Guide (Boxtree, 1994) ISBN 1-85283-415-3
- Named And Shamed (Matador, 2010) ISBN 978 1848765 603
- Tookey's Turkeys (Matador, 2015) ISBN 978-1784621-971
- Tookey's Talkies (Matador, 2015) ISBN 978-1784621-988
