= The Passing Show of 1916 =

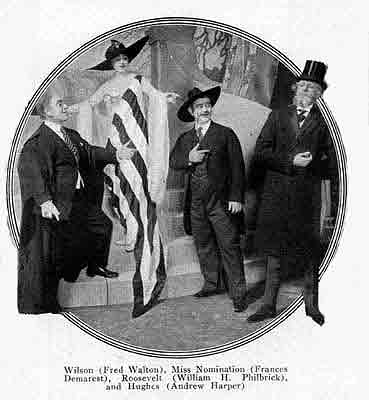
Spoof in which Theodore Roosevelt, Woodrow Wilson and Charles Evans Hughes seek the hand of "Miss Nomination"

The Passing Show of 1916 is a revue featuring the music of Sigmund Romberg and Otto Motzan, with book and lyrics by Harold Atteridge. It included the first George Gershwin songs introduced in a Broadway show.

It opened in the Winter Garden Theater on June 22, 1916 and played for 140 performances, closing on October 21, 1916. It was directed by Jacob J. Shubert and J. C. Huffman and choreographed by Allan K. Foster. The popular song "Pretty Baby" was included in the show.

== Background ==
The original The Passing Show was presented in 1894 by George Lederer at the Casino Theatre. It featured spoofs of theatrical productions of the past season. It was one of the first musical revues on Broadway and led the fashion for such productions. The Casino Theatre produced a revue each summer thereafter for several seasons.

In 1912, Lee and Jacob J. Shubert began an annual series of twelve elaborate Broadway revues at the Winter Garden Theatre, using the name The Passing Show of 19XX, designed to compete with the popular Ziegfeld Follies. They featured libretti by Atteridge and music usually by Sigmund Romberg, George Gershwin or Herman Finck. Willie and Eugene Howard starred in many editions of the series (although not in 1916). Other stars included Charlotte Greenwood, Marilyn Miller, Ed Wynn, De Wolf Hopper, Charles Winninger, Fred Astaire and his sister Adele, Marie Dressler and Fred Allen. Most of the shows were staged by J. C. Huffman.

== Musical numbers ==
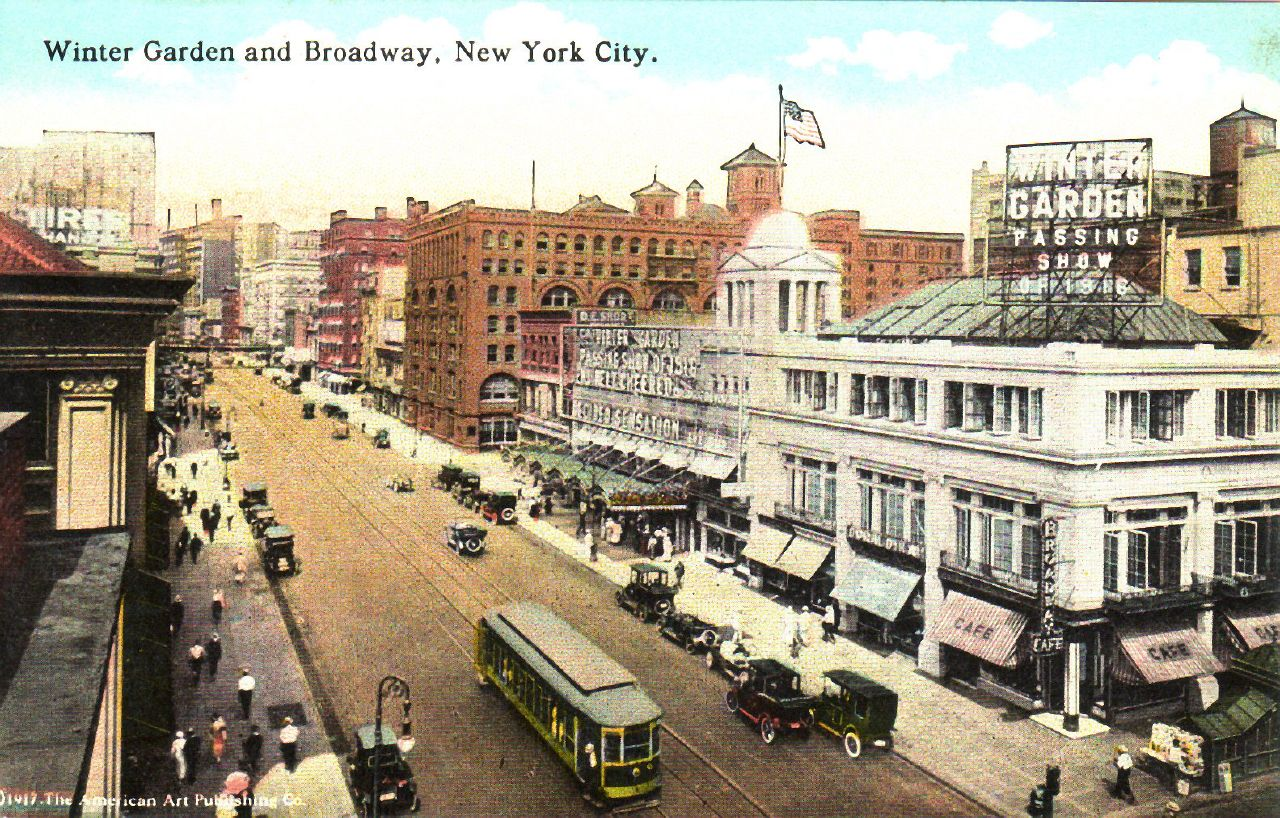
The Winter Garden Theatre, while the review was playing

Act 1

- "Wine, Woman, and Song"
- "Ragging the Apache"
- "So This Is Paris!" (music by Harry Tierney)
- "Play My Melody"
- "Sweet and Pretty"
- "How to Make a Pretty Girl"
- "Around the Town"
- "Roosevelt, Wilson and Hughes"
- "Let Cupid In"
- "Your Auto Ought to Get Girls"
- "Pretty Baby" (music by Egbert Van Alstyne; lyrics by Gus Kahn)
- "What's the Matter with You?" (music and lyrics by Clifton Crawford)

Act 2

- "Any Night on Broadway"
- "Broadway School Days"
- "Romeo and Juliet"
- "Ragtime Calisthenics"
- "That's Called Walking the Dog"
- "The Making of a Girl" (music by Gershwin and Romberg; lyrics by Atteridge)
- Possibly included: "My Runaway Girl" (music by Gershwin; lyrics by Murray Roth)

== See also ==
- The Passing Show of 1918

== Sources ==
- Pollack, Howard (2006). George Gershwin: His Life and Work. University of California Press.
