= Lovers (musical) =

American musical

Lovers is a 1974 musical with music by Steve Sterner, and lyrics and book by Peter del Valle. The story centers on three gay male relationships: one middle-aged couple, a couple of college graduates, and a couple of older men. It was the inaugural production of a gay theater company called The Other Side of Silence (TOSOS). After achieving success with both gay and non-gay audiences, it was moved and premiered on 27 January 1975 at the Players Theater on MacDougal Street, where it ran for 118 performances.

== Background ==
Although planned to appear only a few times in February 1974, the production was repeated from October 1974 due to unexpected success. The slogan for this musical went "The Musical That Proves It's No Longer Sad to Be Gay", a theme which was explored in the play.

Overall the authors aimed this piece to be about relationships filled with love and devotion, without nude or sex scenes. Even kisses were brought down to minimum. The musical number "The Trucks" is the only song to depart from this theme. The musical number "Somehow I'm Taller" was inspired by the song "I'm Gay" from Let My People Come.

== Plot ==
The musical covers vignettes from the lives of the couples rather than being a continuous flow of events. The play handles themes such as sadomasochism (as in the song "Belt & Leather"), fetishization, death of a long-time partner, the beginnings of a relationship cheating and trust, and also promiscuity or role-playing. Many of the topics are not primarily gay-focused, therefore they could reach a broader audience.

It also deals with the fight for gay liberation, as demonstrated in the songs "Celebrate" and "Somehow I'm Taller".

Some of the numbers are played by brass instruments in a 40s and 50s style, there is a ballad, a lot of songs are in a 50s rock’n’roll style, there is also country and western.

== Musical Numbers ==
Act I

„Lovers“ – Company

„Look At Him“ – Eddie & Freddie

„Make It“ – Harry & Dave

„I Don't Want To Watch TV/20 Years“ – Company

„Somebody, Somebody Hold Me“ – Dave

„Belt & Leather“ – Harry & Dave

„There Is Always You“ – George

„Celebrate/Hymn“ – Company

„Somehow I'm Taller“ – Eddie, George & Company

Act II

„Role Playing“ – George & Spencer, Freddie & Eddie

„Argument“ – George & Spencer

„Where Do I Go From Here?“ – Freddie with George, Harry & Dave

„The Trucks“ – Spencer, Harry & Company

„Don't Betray His Love“ – George & Company

„Help Him Along“

„You Came To Me as a Young Man“ – Spencer

„Lovers (Reprise)“ – Company

„Somehow I'm Taller (Reprise)“ – Company

== Cast ==
Character	Original Cast	Players Theatre Cast
Freddie	Martin Rivera	Martin Rivera
Eddie	Jerry Bell	Michael Cascone
Harry	David Fernandez	John Ingle
Dave	Joe Esquibel	Robert Sevra
Spencer	Peter del Valle	Reathel Been
George	Barret Keller	Garry Sneed

== Reception ==
Reviewer Michael Feingold called the musical a "revue about the joys and woes of gay 'married' couples" and compares the direction to a specific audience to Blaxploitation films. He described Peter del Valle’s writing as entertaining but unimaginative and wrote that it did not present audiences with any surprises.
