= Golden Boy of the Blue Ridge =

- Original Cast Recording
- Music: Peter Mills
- Lyrics: Peter Mills
- Book: Peter Mills and Cara Reichel
- Basis: Playboy of the Western World by John Millington Synge
- Premiere: April 11th, 2009: 59E59 Theaters; New York City
- Productions: 2009 Off-Broadway

Golden Boy of the Blue Ridge is a musical based on the Irish classic Playboy of the Western World by John Millington Synge. The music was written by Peter Mills with a book by Peter Mills and Cara Reichel. The story has been transplanted from rural Ireland to 1930s Appalachia and set to a bluegrass-flavored score. It was first presented by Prospect Theater Company at the 59E59 Theaters in New York City April 11 - May 3, 2009.

== Synopsis ==
Act I

All of the action takes place in a small mountain cabin (and speakeasy of sorts) belonging to J.M. McFarland, a moonshiner. Among the other residents living Way Out Back And Beyond in this remote mountain community are J.M.'s daughter Maggie, the local miller Hazel Grubbs, and a somewhat well-off farmer, Luther Coffey, who is engaged to marry Maggie.

Late one night, Luther stops by to pay a call on Maggie, reporting that on his way he heard a strange fellow groaning in a ditch nearby. When J.M. returns with some of his fellow moonshiners, Maggie complains about being left all alone at night (with strange fellows groaning in ditches nearby) ever since they lost their hired man. J.M. counters that Luther ought to be looking after Maggie now, but the cowardly Luther seems utterly unwilling. This argument is interrupted by the arrival of a stranger, Clayton Monroe. The tired, dirty, and scared-looking young man says that he's a fugitive from the law, though he can't remember the word for what he's done. Fascinated, the locals interrogate Clay and try to guess his crime. (The Right Man For The Job) Eventually, Clay confesses that he killed his father... with a shovel, no less! ("Patricide"... that's the word!) All of the locals are very impressed by this story, and J.M. offers Clay a job as the new hired man, looking after his cabin and his daughter. Maggie's fiancé Luther is uneasy with this arrangement, but Maggie chases him off.

Left alone together, Clay tells Maggie his story in greater detail: his tyrant father was trying to force him to marry a wealthy widow woman, but for the first time in his life, Clay stood up to his father and swore he'd be Never Afeard Again. Maggie becomes all the more fascinated by Clay and this mixture of vulnerability, bravery, honesty and ferocity she sees in him.

At the climax of Clay's story about his newfound bravery, a sudden knock at the door scares him out of his wits. It's the Widow Hazel, who says she's come to take Clay to lodge at her Little Log Cabin. It isn't fitting, Hazel says, for a murderer to be keeping company with a young woman. The Widow claims that she murdered her own husband, therefore she's a more suitable companion for Clay. A fierce battle ensues between the two women, with Clay eventually deciding the contest in favor of Maggie.

The next morning, while Maggie is out doing chores, a group of local women come by the cabin. They've heard rumors that there's A Wanted Man thereabouts, and they're all eager to meet him. Clay, beginning to enjoy his newfound celebrity, tells his story again, and it grows with the telling. (Twice-Told Tale) Maggie returns and discovers Clay in the midst of his fawning admirers. Angrily she chases the women off and scolds Clay, warning him that he'd best not be boasting of his crime: it'll get back to a lawman, and he'll be hanged for it. Clay is stung by this and says he'd better be going, but Maggie stops him and confesses that she doesn't really want him to go. Clay leaves to do his chores, and Maggie ponders her growing feelings for him, wondering whether he might be the Golden Boy for whom she's waited so long.

J.M. enters in a panic, with Clay: a lawman has been seen snooping around the area, and J.M. is worried about his moonshining operations. He tells Clay to guard the cabin while he goes to defend the still. Hazel and Luther come by and warn Maggie that one of her cows has gotten loose; Maggie exits to pursue it. Luther tries to bribe Clay into leaving, offering him a First-Class Ticket on the next train out of town, along with various articles of his clothing. Clay exits to try on his new clothes, but shows no intention of leaving. Luther is in despair, convinced that Maggie is going to drop him and marry Clay instead. Widow Hazel offers to help him—for a price. Luther gladly agrees to her terms and goes on his way.

Clay returns in his new finery, and Hazel admires him. Suddenly, Clay spots the lawman approaching the cabin and hides. The lawman enters and Hazel tells him that he won't find any moonshine around these parts. But this, it seems, is not what the lawman is after. Instead, he's looking for a young man who split his father's head with a shovel. As the lawman tells the story of the son's treachery, he becomes more and more agitated, until at last he pulls off his hat to reveal a bloody head wound. This is Clay's father, Leroy, and he vows that this business with his son is Nowhere Near To Done.

Act II

Hazel is delighted by these new developments, and wastes no time turning them to her advantage. She gets rid of Leroy, telling him that she saw his son headed a certain way—a way that it so happens will take him right to J.M.'s fiercely guarded still. Clay emerges from hiding in despair: he'll surely lose Maggie now. Just as she did with Luther, Hazel promises to help Clay reunite with Maggie—for a price. Now, whoever wins out, she stands to gain: it's all Grist For The Mill.

That evening, there is a hootenanny in celebration of Luther's impending nuptials, to be held in the backroom of J.M.'s cabin. All are anxiously anticipating what will unfold on that occasion. (A Wanted Man reprise). Not long after the shindig has gotten underway, Leroy returns to complain about Hazel's directions. He has acquired another bloody wound, this time from J.M.'s shotgun, after Hazel sent him towards the moonshine still. Leroy hears music from the backroom and looks in on the hoedown. There he sees Clay dancing with Maggie and goes into a frenzy, shouting "I'll kill him!" But Hazel, with the help of a couple of local boys, is able to subdue Leroy, ply him with moonshine, and convince the vengeful father that That Ain't Him. Once more, she sends Leroy on his way, this time to live as a hermit, as she has convinced him that he's clearly lost his wits.

Maggie and Clay duck out of the dancing for a breather and a bit of canoodling. Their attraction has blossomed into love and they confess their feelings. (More To Me) Clay asks Maggie to marry him instead of Luther, and Maggie happily agrees. J.M and Luther find the lovers together, and Maggie announces her new intentions to them. J.M. protests at the idea of having a murderer for a son-in-law, saying that Inlaws and Outlaws don't mix. Luther tries in vain to persuade Maggie from her decision, and appeals to J.M., reminding him of all the livestock he'd be getting into the bargain. But in the end, J.M. decides that accepting Clay is the wiser and safer course.

Leroy returns yet again. He sees Clay, and this time there can be no mistaking it: that's his son. All hell breaks loose—pandemonium ensues, with everyone at Sixes And Sevens. Eventually, J.M. gets his shotgun and calls a halt to the madness. J.M. believes that he has caught the revenuer who was looking for his still, but the truth about who Leroy is soon comes out. Maggie is shocked to learn of Clay's deception, but Clay is determined to prove himself to her. He tells his father that it's time they finish this once and for all, and the two of them step outside. The locals crowd eagerly at the windows, as sounds of a furious battle are heard, climaxing in a sickening crunch and a splatter of blood on the windows.

Clay returns, grimly. Having now witnessed a murder first-hand, the locals begin to turn on Clay and start to talk of lynching. Clay faces Maggie and tells her that he's not sorry for what he's done. He may have been a liar and a coward before, but now he truly has changed. He implores her to come with him and they'll find a new life together somewhere. (West of Where I Been) Maggie considers, and then sadly slips a rope over Clay as the lynch mob tries to drag him out of the cabin.

It is at this point that the indestructible Leroy comes crawling in the door one last time. He's not dead, and he's actually proud of his son now. He tells the stunned locals that nobody's gonna hang his boy; he's coming home a hero. But Clay rejects this. He's not going with his father, and he's not staying with Maggie. He'll go his own way from now on. Clay leaves, and Maggie realizes that she has lost her one true golden boy of the Blue Ridge. (Finale)

== Additional productions ==
Golden Boy of the Blue Ridge premiered outside New York City on August 23, 2012 at the Cumberland County Playhouse in Crossville, Tennessee. The show ran for 28 scheduled performances. The production was directed by John Fionte who also designed the set. Resident actor Greg Pendzick took the lead role and was nominated for his work by First Night Honors. The production received favorable reviews by Broadwayworld-Nashville, in part saying:

"Fionte's ensemble of actors/musicians delivers the goods with big-hearted, expansive style, intelligently playing the comedy with more subtlety than expected. Donald Frison's choreography seems inspired by both mountain clogging and high-Flying Musical theater style, which gives the show a lighthearted, sprightly spring in its step."

== Recordings ==
The Original Off-Broadway Cast Recording was released by Great White Wax, Inc on June 30, 2010.
