= Tom Sankey =

American dramatist

Thomas P. Sankey (28 July 1933 – 26 August 2010) was an American folk singer, playwright and actor known for the 1967 off Broadway production The Golden Screw.

In 1962, Sankey contributed to the folksongs in Jonas Mekas's film of Allen Ginsberg, Guns of the Trees.

The Golden Screw was a folk rock musical documenting the progress of folk singer, Bob Dylanesque . The complete score for the show was recorded by Sankey on Atco Records (33-208, mono). The show's band was called The Inner Sanctum and featured Kevin Michael, Lead Guitar, and Gerry Michael.

The next year, 1968, Sankey played tenor guitar with Gerry Michael and The Bummers at Woodstock.
