= Jekyll & Hyde: Direct from Broadway =

- DVD Cover Art
- Based on: Jekyll & Hyde by Leslie Bricusse; Frank Wildhorn
- Directed by: Don Roy King
- Starring: David Hasselhoff; Coleen Sexton; Andrea Rivette; George Merritt; Barrie Ingham
- Theme music composer: Frank Wildhorn; Leslie Bricusse; Steve Cuden
- Country of origin: United States
- Original language: English

Production
- Running time: 135 minutes

Original release
- Release: March 10, 2001

Jekyll & Hyde: Direct from Broadway is a 2001 television film of the Broadway production of the 1990 musical Jekyll & Hyde as captured live in performance on Broadway featuring the show's final Broadway cast. The show was captured at Broadway's Plymouth Theatre in New York City December 2000 utilizing multiple high-definition cameras by Broadway Worldwide.

The film was released March 10, 2001, as a one-night-only event in seven digital cinemas in Boston, Cincinnati, Cleveland, Dallas, New York, Phoenix, and Washington, D.C., with showings on cable and satellite pay-per-view channels in the U.S., Canada, and Latin America. This marked the first time that a non-film had been distributed for digital cinema showing. The program was released on DVD and VHS September 11, 2001, by GoodTimes Video, with a DVD re-release November 14, 2006, by Image Entertainment. HBO bought the program in December 2002 for a two-year contract on the network.

There was a professionally shot performance as a rehearsal for the official one used for the DVD. In the former it starred Rob Evan, an alternate and veteran with the production, in the title role. It is currently available on YouTube.

== Plot summary ==
Act I

Attorney and friend John Utterson and future father-in-law Sir Danvers Carew introduce Dr. Henry Jekyll to the audience. Beside his comatose father's bed, Jekyll tells the audience that man is both good and evil ("Lost in the Darkness").

The citizens of London describe the dualities inherent in their lives ("Facade"). Jekyll proposes to the Board of Governors of St. Jude's Hospital a personality research experiment on humans to separate good from evil, but the board rejects "Jekyll's Plea". Jekyll feels he is right and seeks to "Pursue the Truth".

Sir Danvers hosts an engagement party for his daughter, Emma. Guests try to persuade Emma to end her engagement with Dr. Henry and she sings "Emma's Reasons" to explain why she stays. Jekyll arrives late to the party as usual. He warns Emma of his duty to his work and she pledges to stand behind him ("I Must Go On/Take Me as I Am").

Jekyll and Utterson go to "The Red Rat" bar for his bachelor party. Backstage, club manager Spider scolds prostitute Lucy Harris for arriving late. As she prepares for her act, Lucy realizes "No One Knows Who I Am". On stage, she sings "Good 'N' Evil" and Jekyll is captivated by her. Lucy flirts with Jekyll, but he is reticent to go any further ["Here's to the Night (Lucy meets Jekyll)"].

Back home, Henry tells John that he has found a subject for his experiment. He goes into his lab and realizes that "This Is the Moment". He logs his work into his journal. He injects the formula into his arm and writhes in pain ("First Transformation"). A new, aggressive personality emerges: Edward Hyde ("Alive").

Jekyll spends the next several weeks working secretly in his lab. Emma, Sir Danvers and Utterson worry Jekyll has reduced his life to "His Work and Nothing More".

Lucy Harris arrives at the doctor's home and shows him the bruises caused by Edward Hyde. Jekyll realizes the connection. Under the doctor's care, Lucy begins to have feelings for him ("Sympathy, Tenderness"/"Someone Like You"). Edward Hyde leaves the lab and kills the Bishop of Basingstoke, a member of the Board of Governors and a secret pedophile.

Act II

Five more of the governors who rejected Jekyll's experiment proposal are dead as the townspeople wonder who is behind this string of murders ("Murder Murder"). Emma reads a part of the doctor's journal and begs him to confide in her ("Once Upon a Dream"). Utterson discovers Jekyll has revised his will to make Hyde his sole heir and demands to know more about Hyde. Jekyll tells him he is only a 'colleague' in his experiment, while knowing Hyde is part of him ("Obsession"). Meanwhile, Lucy and Emma fantasize about the new men in their lives, not realizing they are one and the same ( "In His Eyes"). Lucy is terrified of Hyde but she cannot help submitting to him, even though "It's a Dangerous Game".

Utterson comes to Jekyll's lab and witnesses Hyde revert to Dr. Henry Jekyll. The truth is now known and Jekyll wants to be restored to his former self ("The Way Back"). Jekyll wants to protect Lucy and sends her money. As Lucy begins to plan "A New Life" for herself, Hyde arrives and murders her. Back at his lab, Jekyll faces off with Hyde in a final battle for control(“Confrontation").

Several months later, Emma and Jekyll are at the church for their wedding. As the ceremony begins, Jekyll bends over in pain, pleads "no, no" and transforms into Hyde. The Jekyll part of the man begs John to kill him but his friend cannot. Jekyll stabs "himself" as Emma bids farewell to her "tormented love." ("Finale")

== Cast ==
- David Hasselhoff as Dr. Henry Jekyll / Mr. Edward Hyde
- Coleen Sexton as Lucy Harris
- Andrea Rivette as Emma Carew
- George Merritt as Mr. John Utterson, Esq.
- Barrie Ingham as Sir Danvers Carew
- Martin Van Treuren as Lord Theodore Savage / The Spider
- Robert Jensen as Mr. Simon Stride
- Joel Robertson as the Bishop of Basingstoke
- Corinne Melançon as Lady Beaconsfield / Guinevere
- Bill E. Dietrich as Sir Archibald Proops / Second Gentleman / Sir Peter / Barrow Boy
- Stuart Marland as General Lord Glossop / Siegfried / Policeman
- Peter Johl as Poole / Doctor / Coachman / Lord G.
- David Chaney as Bisset / Davie / Old Man / Manservant / Maitre d'Hotel / Priest at Wedding
- Brandi Chavonne Massey as Nurse / Bet / Housemaid / Bridesmaid / Young Girl
- John Treacy Egan as Mike / Groom
- Kelli O'Hara as Kate
- Russell B. Warfield as Attendant / Jack / Under Footman / Tough / Doorman / Curate
- Frank Mastrone as Albert / Priest at Funeral / First Gentleman / Attendant
- John Schiappa as Mental Patient / Ned / Tough
- Sheri Cowart as Alice / Nurse / Whore / Housemaid / Bridesmaid
- Juan Betancur as Mentall Patient / Bill / Tough / Choir Boy / Newsboy
- Sally Ann Tumas as Molly
- Bonnie Schon as Polly / Whore

== Musical numbers ==
Act I
- "Prologue"
- "Lost In the Darkness" – Jekyll
- "Façade" – Townsfolk
- "Jekyll's Plea" – Jekyll, Simon Stride, Sir Danvers, Board of Governors
- "Pursue the Truth" – Jekyll, Utterson
- "Façade (reprise #1)" – Townsfolk
- "Emma's Reasons" – Emma, Simon Stride
- "Take Me As I Am" – Jekyll, Emma
- "Letting Go" – Emma, Sir Danvers
- "Façade (reprise #2)" – Townsfolk
- "No One Knows Who I Am" – Lucy
- "Good 'N' Evil" – Lucy, Prostitutes
- "Here's to the Night (Lucy meets Jekyll)" – Jekyll, Lucy
- "Now There Is No Choice" – Jekyll
- "This Is the Moment" – Jekyll
- "First Transformation" – Jekyll and Hyde
- "Alive" – Hyde
- "His Work and Nothing More" – Jekyll, Emma, Utterson, Sir Danvers
- "Sympathy, Tenderness" – Lucy
- "Someone Like You" – Lucy
- "Alive (reprise)" – Hyde

Act II

- "Murder, Murder" – Townsfolk
- "Once Upon a Dream" – Emma
- "Obsession" – Jekyll
- "In His Eyes" – Lucy, Emma
- "Dangerous Game" – Hyde, Lucy
- "Façade (reprise #3)" – Spider, Townsfolk
- "The Way Back" – Jekyll
- "A New Life" – Lucy
- "Sympathy, Tenderness (reprise)" – Hyde
- "Confrontation" – Jekyll and Hyde
- "Façade (reprise #4)" – Townsfolk
- "Finale" – Emma

== See also ==
- Strange Case of Dr Jekyll and Mr Hyde, 1886 novella by Robert Louis Stevenson
