= Andrea Rivette =

American actress

Andrea Rivette is an American actress who has starred on Broadway as Emma Carew in Jekyll & Hyde, with Jack Wagner, Sebastian Bach, David Hasselhoff, and Rob Evan as well as on the national tour with Chuck Wagner.

Rivette also starred in Miss Saigon on the Second National tour as Ellen Scott, the American GI's wife, opposite Will Chase and Steven Pasquale. She also performed the role on Broadway as the understudy to Misty Cotton and Anastasia Barzee.

Andrea has performed around the US, in Canada and Barbados.

In 2013, Rivette won the Richmond Theater Critic's Circle Award for Best Actress in a Musical for her portrayal of Diana Goodman in Next to Normal for Cadence Theater Company in association with Virginia Rep.

Over the 2016-17 holiday season, Rivette played the role of Mother in A Christmas Story at Virginia Rep.

Other regional theater credits include: Margaret White in Carrie: The Musical, Betty Haynes in White Christmas opposite Kevin Earley, Fantine in Les Misérables opposite Rob Evan and Ivan Rutherford, Magnolia in Show Boat, Christine in the Yeston Kopit Phantom, Helen Bechdel in Fun Home, and Mrs Banks in Mary Poppins.
