= Someone like You =

Someone like You may refer to:

== Film, television, and theatre ==
- Someone Like You (2001 film), a 2001 American romantic comedy
- Someone like You (2009 film) or Unnaipol Oruvan, an Indian Tamil-language film directed by Chakri Toleti
- Someone Like You (2024 film), a 2024 American romance film
- Aap Jaisa Koi (film) (lit. 'Someone like You'), a 2025 Indian Hindi-language film by Vivek Soni
- Someone like You (TV series), a 2015 Taiwanese romantic-comedy melodrama series
- Someone like You (musical), a 1989 West End musical

== Literature ==
- Someone like You (novel), by Sarah Dessen, 1998
- Someone Like You, a 2013 novel by Indian writer Nikita Singh
- Someone like You (short story collection), a 1953 book by Roald Dahl

== Songs ==
- "Someone like You" (Adele song), 2011
- "Someone like You" (New Order song), 2001
- "Someone like You" (SafetySuit song), 2008
- "Someone like You" (Sylvester song), 1986
- "Someone like You" (Van Morrison song), 1987
- "Someone like You" (Emmylou Harris song), 1984
- "Aap Jaisa Koi" (lit. 'Someone like You'), by Nazia Hassan, from the 1980 Indian film Qurbani
- "Someone like U", by Ariana Grande from Positions, 2020
- "Someone like You", by Arthur Louis, 1974
- "Someone like You", by Bang Tango from Psycho Café, 1989
- "Someone like You", by Boys Like Girls from Love Drunk, 2009
- "Someone like You", by Daryl Hall from Three Hearts in the Happy Ending Machine, 1986
- "Someone like You", by Icehouse from Sidewalk, 1984
- "Someone like You", by Living Colour from Time's Up, 1990
- "Someone like You", by Mac Miller from Watching Movies with the Sound Off, 2013
- "Someone like You", by the Michael Stanley Band from You Can't Fight Fashion, 1983
- "Someone like You", by the Operation M.D. from We Have an Emergency, 2007
- "Someone like You", by Paolo Nutini from Caustic Love, 2014
- "Someone like You", by Russell Watson from The Voice, 2000
- "Someone like You", by Shayne Ward from Obsession, 2010
- "Someone like You", by the Summer Set from Everything's Fine, 2011
- "Someone like You", by Trust Company from True Parallels, 2011
- "Someone like You", from the film My Dream Is Yours, 1949
- "Someone like You", from the stage musical Jekyll & Hyde, 1990
- "Someone Like You", by Zhang Zhenyuan, 2026

== See also ==
- "Somebody like You" (38 Special song), a 1986 song by American rock band 38 Special
- "Somebody Like You", a 2002 song by Australian country singer Keith Urban
- Unnaipol Oruvan (disambiguation)
- Someone like Me (disambiguation)
- Yourself or Someone Like You, a 1996 album by Matchbox Twenty
