= Joseph Mahowald =

American actor and singer

- Born: Huron, South Dakota, USA
- Other name: Joe Mahowald
- Education: University of South Dakota; University of Texas at Austin; University of Cincinnati
- Occupations: Actor, singer
- Years active: 1987–2016
- Known for: Jekyll & Hyde

Joseph Mahowald, also known as Joe Mahowald, is an American actor and singer who is known for his Broadway roles. He made his Broadway debut as Enjolras in Les Misérables before going on to be the alternate for the title roles in Jekyll & Hyde on Broadway for almost two years. He would later return to Les Mis as Inspector Javert.

== Early life ==
From 1977 to 1979 he attended to the University of South Dakota. He then went to the University of Texas at Austin for a year majoring in voice and opera. From 1980 to 1984 he finished his undergraduate education at the University of Cincinnati, graduating with a Bachelor of Fine Arts degree in musical theatre.

== Career ==
He made his Broadway debut in 1992 as Enjolras in Les Misérables at the Imperial Theatre.

On 6 January 1999, he would join the Broadway cast of Jekyll & Hyde at the Plymouth Theatre as the alternate performer of the title roles. He would stay with the production until his final performance on 30 September 2000. Over that span of 21 months he would serve as the alternate for Rob Evan, Jack Wagner, and Sebastian Bach.

In July 2001, he would join the cast of the 3rd US Tour of Les Misérables this time playing Inspector Javert. He was then asked to fill in for the same role in the Broadway production for 7 weeks in 2002 which he did. He then returned to the tour and gave his final bow as Javert in July 2003.

In 2007, he returned to Broadway in The Pirate Queen as Chieftain O'Flaherty and an ensemble member and understudy.

In 2011, he toured the United States in 9 to 5 as Franklin Hart Jr.

== Notable theatre roles ==
Year(s)	Production	Role	Location	Notes
1987	Camelot	Lancelot du Lac	Tennessee Repertory Theatre	Regional
1990	Into the Woods	The Wolf / Cinderella's Prince	North Shore Music Theatre	Regional
1990	Sweeney Todd: The Demon Barber of Fleet Street	Anthony Hope	Benedum Center for the Performing Arts	Regional
1991	Camelot	Lancelot du Lac	Benedum Center for the Performing Arts	Regional
1991	The Merry Widow	Vicomte Cascada	Paper Mill Playhouse	Regional
1991	Camelot	Lancelot du Lac	Paper Mill Playhouse	Regional
1992-1993	Les Misérables	Enjolras	Imperial Theatre	Broadway
1995	Gigi	Gaston Lachailles	Westchester Broadway Theatre	Regional
1996	1776	Thomas Jefferson	Benedum Center for the Performing Arts	Regional
1996	Into the Woods	The Wolf / Rapunzel's Prince	Benedum Center for the Performing Arts	Regional
1997	Chess	Anatoly Sergievsky	Benedum Center for the Performing Arts	Regional
1997	Carousel	Billy Bigelow	Westchester Broadway Theatre	Regional
1998	Seven Brides for Seven Brothers	Adam Pontipee	Sacramento Music Circus	Regional
1999-2000	Jekyll & Hyde	Dr. Henry Jekyll / Mr. Edward Hyde (Alternate)	Plymouth Theatre	Broadway
2001	1776	John Adams	5th Avenue Theatre	Regional
2001-2002	Les Misérables	Inspector Javert	3rd US National Tour	Marius Company
2002	Les Misérables	Inspector Javert	Imperial Theatre	Broadway
2002-2003	Les Misérables	Inspector Javert	3rd US National Tour	Marius Company
2004	Sweeney Todd: The Demon Barber of Fleet Street	Sweeney Todd	Centerstage Head Theater	Regional
2005	Lone Star Love	Frank Ford	John Houseman Theatre	Off-Broadway
2006	Beauty and the Beast	The Beast	Sarofim Hall	Theatre Under the Stars
2006	The Pirate Queen	Chieftain O'Flaherty / Ensemble u/s Dubhdara u/s Sir Richard Bingham	Cadillac Palace Theatre	Pre-Broadway
2007	The Pirate Queen	Chieftain O'Flaherty / Ensemble u/s Dubhdara u/s Sir Richard Bingham	Hilton Theater	Broadway
2008	Beauty and the Beast	The Beast	Westchester Broadway Theatre	Regional
2009	Seven Brides for Seven Brothers	Adam Pontipee	Wells Fargo Pavilion	Regional
2010-2011	9 to 5	Franklin Hart Jr.	Various Venues	US National Tour
2011	Guys and Dolls	Sky Masterson	Sarofim Hall	Theatre Under the Stars
