= This Is the Moment =

Song from the musical Jekyll & Hyde

"This Is the Moment" is a major song from the musical Jekyll & Hyde. It was written by Frank Wildhorn and Leslie Bricusse. The song was first performed in the musical by cast member Chuck Wagner as Jekyll & Hyde at the Alley Theatre in Houston in May 1990. Prior to the stage production, a studio version was already released in March 1990 on a concept album titled Highlights from Jekyll & Hyde, performed by Colm Wilkinson.

Actors from the Broadway production like Robert Cuccioli and David Hasselhoff sang it in the key of E.

== Translations ==
The song was translated to various languages in the foreign productions of Jekyll & Hyde, including Chinese, Finnish, Hungarian, Portuguese, Korean, Japanese, German, Swedish, and Spanish. A remake was also made by Garry Hagger in Dutch as "Het allermooiste", but that version's lyrics have a different subject. The Czech version "To je ta chvile" was recorded by the 4 Tenors on their debut album, which was awarded Gold and Platinum records.

== Lyrics ==
There were a few changes in the lyrics of the song comparing the concept version and the actual version.

While in the concept lyrics, Jekyll sings:

"This is the day, Just see it shine, When all I've lived for Becomes mine!"

In the actual version, he sings:

"This is the day, See it sparkle and shine, When all I've lived for Becomes mine!"

The part in the concept version, when he sings:

"This is the moment, This is the hour When I can open up tomorrow Like a flower, And put my hand to, Everything I planned to, Fulfil my grand design, See all my stars align!"

Where the melody is very similar to the beginning of the song, was totally changed adds a bridge, with the melody and lyrics changed to:

"For all these years, I've faced the world alone, And now the time has come To prove to them I've made it on my own!"
