= Johl =

Johl may refer to:

- Max G. Johl (1876-1935), an American philatelist of Connecticut
- Peter Johl who died November 3, 2005, after a long career on Broadway
