= Dr Jekyll and Mr Hyde (character) =

Fictional character by Robert Louis Stevenson

Dr Henry Jekyll or Mr Edward Hyde
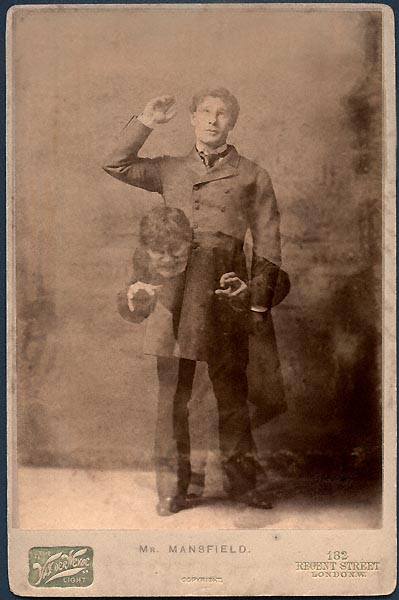
- Actor Richard Mansfield originated the dual portrayal of Dr Jekyll and Mr Hyde in an 1887 stage adaptation of Stevenson's novella.
- First appearance: Strange Case of Dr Jekyll and Mr Hyde
- Created by: Robert Louis Stevenson
- Portrayed by: King Baggot; John Barrymore; Fredric March; Spencer Tracy; Louis Hayward; Philip Van Zandt; Tom Kennedy; Boris Karloff; Michael Rennie; Paul Massie; Jack Palance; Ralph Bates; David Hemmings; John Malkovich; Jason Flemyng; John Hannah; Robbie Coltrane; Tony Todd; Hank Harris; Sam Witwer; Anthony Warlow; Chuck Wagner; Robert Cuccioli; Rob Evan; Joseph Mahowald; Jack Wagner; Sebastian Bach; David Hasselhoff; James Nesbitt; Constantine Maroulis; Russell Crowe; Shazad Latif; Eddie Izzard; Michael Caine

In-universe information
- Alias: Edward Hyde (or Hyde or Mr Hyde)
- Species: Mutated human
- Gender: Male
- Occupation: Doctor
- Nationality: English

Dr Henry Jekyll, along with his alter ego Mr Edward Hyde, is the central character of Robert Louis Stevenson's 1886 novella Strange Case of Dr Jekyll and Mr Hyde. In the story, Dr Jekyll is a good friend of main protagonist Gabriel John Utterson. Living in Soho, in London, Jekyll is a kind and respected English doctor struggling with repressed evil urges. As a potential solution, he develops a serum that he believes will effectively remove his more twisted traits. Instead, Jekyll transforms into Edward Hyde, the physical and mental manifestation of his own misdeeds. This process happens more regularly until Jekyll becomes unable to control when the transformations occur. Jekyll roams London as Mr Hyde and lives and works at home as Dr Jekyll.

== Fictional character biography ==
Dr Henry Jekyll, M.D., D.C.L, LL.D., F.R.S., etc. is a doctor based in the fashionable Soho district of London who feels that he is battling between the benevolence and malevolence within himself. He spends his life trying to repress evil urges that are not fitting for a man of his profession. Jekyll develops a potion in an attempt to mask this hidden evil. However, in doing so, Jekyll transforms into a younger and more hideous humanoid. Jekyll decides to take advantage of this, naming this transformation of his "Edward Hyde" and uses his new persona to act out his hidden desires free of consequences while keeping his social status as Jekyll. As Jekyll continues taking the potion, Hyde grows in power and eventually manifests whenever Jekyll shows signs of physical or moral weakness, no longer needing the potion to transform.

Stevenson never says exactly what Hyde does, generally saying that it is something of an evil and lustful nature. Thus, in the context of the times, it is abhorrent to Victorian religious morality, potentially including engaging with prostitutes or buggery. However, it is Hyde's violent activities that seem to give him the most thrills, driving him to attack and murder Sir Danvers Carew without apparent reason, making him a hunted outlaw throughout England. Carew was a client of Gabriel Utterson, Jekyll's lawyer and friend, who is concerned by Hyde's history of violence and the fact that Jekyll changed his will, leaving everything to Hyde. Dr Hastie Lanyon, a mutual acquaintance of Jekyll and Utterson, dies of shock after receiving information relating to Jekyll. Before his death, Lanyon gives Utterson a letter to be opened only after Jekyll's death or disappearance.

When Jekyll refuses to leave his lab for weeks, Utterson and Jekyll's butler Mr Poole break into the lab. Inside, they find the body of Hyde wearing Jekyll's clothes and apparently dead from suicide. They find also a letter from Jekyll to Utterson promising to explain the entire mystery. Utterson takes the document home where he first reads Lanyon's letter and then Jekyll's.

The first reveals that Lanyon's deterioration and eventual death resulted from seeing Hyde drinking a serum or potion and subsequently turning into Jekyll. The second letter explains that Jekyll, having previously indulged unstated vices (and with it the fear that discovery would lead to his losing his social position), found a way to transform himself and thereby indulge his vices without fear of detection. But as Jekyll used Hyde to act out his desires more and more, he effectively became a sociopath — evil, violent, self-indulgent, and utterly uncaring to anyone but himself. Initially, Jekyll was able to control the transformations, but later, he became Hyde involuntarily in his sleep.

At this point, Jekyll resolved to cease becoming Hyde. One night however, the urge gripped him too strongly. After the transformation, he immediately rushed out and violently killed Carew. Horrified, Jekyll tried more adamantly to stop the transformations as now his scapegoat was no longer safe. For a time, he proved successful by engaging in philanthropic work. One day at a park, he considered how good a person he had become as a result of his deeds (in comparison to others), believing himself redeemed. However, before he completed his line of thought, he looked down at his hands and realized that he had suddenly transformed once again into Hyde. This was the first time that an involuntary metamorphosis had happened in waking hours.

Far from his laboratory and hunted by the police as a murderer, Hyde needed help to avoid being caught. He wrote to Lanyon (in Jekyll's hand) asking his friend to retrieve the contents of a cabinet in his laboratory and to meet him at midnight at Lanyon's home in Cavendish Square. In Lanyon's presence, Hyde mixed the potion and transformed back to Jekyll - ultimately leading to Lanyon's death. Meanwhile, Jekyll returned to his home only to find himself ever more helpless and trapped as the transformations increased in frequency and necessitated even larger doses of potion in order to reverse them.

Eventually, the stock of ingredients from which Jekyll had been preparing the potion ran low, and subsequent batches prepared by Dr Jekyll from renewed stocks failed to produce the transformation. Jekyll speculated that the one essential ingredient that made the original potion work (a chemical salt) must have itself been contaminated. After sending Poole to one chemist after another to purchase the chemical salt that was running low only to find it would not work, he assumed that subsequent supplies all lacked the essential ingredient that made the potion successful for his experiments. His ability to change back from Hyde into Jekyll had slowly vanished in consequence. Jekyll wrote that even as he composed his letter, he knew that he would soon become Hyde permanently, having used the last of this salt and he wondered if Hyde would face execution for his crimes or choose to kill himself. Jekyll noted that in either case, the end of his letter marked the end of his life. He ended the letter saying "I bring the life of that unhappy Henry Jekyll to an end". With these words, both the document and the novella come to a close.

The original pronunciation of "Jekyll", as used in Stevenson's native Scotland, rhymed with "treacle", thus (/ˈdʒiːkəl/).

== Adaptations ==
While there are adaptations of the book, this section depicts notable portrayals of the character in different media:

=== Television ===
- Dr Jekyll appeared in some of Warner Bros.' Looney Tunes and Merrie Melodies animated shorts.
  - Dr Jerkyl's Hide (1954) features Sylvester turning into a Hyde-like cat upon ingesting the formula, which he mistook for soda.
  - Hyde and Hare (1955) depicts Dr Jekyll (voiced by Mel Blanc) bringing Bugs Bunny to his apartment. When Dr Jekyll drinks his formula, he becomes Mr Hyde who is depicted with green skin and red eyes. Toward the end of the short, Bugs drinks the formula and transforms into a Hyde-like rabbit.
  - In Hyde and Go Tweet (1960), Dr Jekyll drinks a formula that turns himself into Mr Hyde. The commotion wakes Sylvester, who then sees Hyde revert to the form of Jekyll. Tweety later exposes himself to Dr Jekyll's formula and he becomes a Hyde-like canary.
- Dr Jekyll and Mr Hyde appear in Climax! episode "The Strange Case of Dr Jekyll and Mr Hyde". Hosted by Bill Lundigan, this episode was originally aired on 28 July 1955 (Season 1 Episode 34). The story was adapted for television by Gore Vidal.
- The Scooby-Doo, Where are You! episode "Nowhere to Hyde" features the Ghost of Mr Hyde (voiced by John Stephenson) who is committing jewelry store robberies; one of the suspects is a descendant of Dr Jekyll.
- In the Dynomutt, Dog Wonder episode "Everyone Hyde!", the criminal Willie the Weasel (voiced by Henry Corden) creates a similar formula (which is related to Dr Jekyll's formula) that turns him into Mr Hyde.
- The grandson of Dr Jekyll and Mr Hyde is featured in The Comic Strip segment "The Mini Monsters" voiced by Bob McFadden. He works as the camp physician at Camp Mini-Mon. When Dr Jekyll goes into a room to get something for his patients, Mr Hyde comes out with the item in question. When Mr Hyde goes back into the room, Dr Jekyll comes back out. Dr Jekyll considers Mr Hyde to be his "partner".
- In the Gravedale High episode "Fear of Flying", there is a medical version of Dr Jekyll and Mr Hyde (voiced by Frank Welker) that works as a doctor for Gravedale's monster community. Mr Hyde serves as Dr Jekyll's "partner" where Dr Jekyll would turn into him for any second opinions of anyone's medical problems. He was the one who referred Vinnie Stoker to an ape psychologist when he was unable to fly following an accident.
- Dr Jekyll and Mr Hyde appear in the Animaniacs episode "Brain Meets Brawn", voiced by Jeff Bennett. Dr Jekyll was seen taking a serum that turns him into Mr Hyde who is then attacked by the police. They take a break in the conflict when tea time occurs. Afterwards, the police subdue Mr Hyde and take him away to the police station. Dr Jekyll's serum inspires Brain to take it in a bid to attack Big Ben.
- The 2007 TV serial Jekyll starred James Nesbitt as Tom Jackman, a modern Jekyll whose Hyde persona wreaks havoc in modern London. In the course of the series, it is revealed that the original Jekyll's transformation into Hyde was a 'natural' process, triggered by Jekyll's love for his maid rather than any kind of potion, and Jackman is the descendant of one of Hyde's bastard sons, while his wife is a clone of Jekyll's maid created by a corporation to try and duplicate the Hyde process. As with most modern adaptations, Hyde is depicted as possessing superhuman strength, able to tear a lion apart with his bare hands, and is depicted as being impulsive and childish rather than explicitly evil, although the physical changes are fairly subtle, such as Hyde having darker eyes and a different hairstyle. At the series' conclusion, Hyde apparently sacrifices himself to save Jackman, "dying" when he is shot but somehow able to stop Jackman "sharing the damage", with the result that the bullets remain in Jackman but he has no injuries to demonstrate where they entered his body.
- NBC's Do No Harm is a modern retelling of the Jekyll and Hyde story featuring a renamed Jekyll-like character named Dr Jason Cole (played by Steven Pasquale) trying to stop his drug-addicted, sociopathic, Hyde-like counterpart named Ian Price from ruining his professional and private life. Unlike the original story, the main character is a highly respected neurosurgeon who is able to keep his alter-ego in check through the use of an experimental sedative. Also, Jason suffers from dissociative identity disorder instead of developing a serum that separates the good and evil in a person.
- The Phineas and Ferb episode "The Monster of Phineas-n-Ferbenstein" features the villain Dr Jekyll Doofenshmirtz drinking a potion to turn himself into a monster.
- The Penn Zero: Part-Time Hero episode "Rip-Penn" features Penn as Dr Barzelby (inspired by Dr Jekyll) who accidentally drinks a potion that turns him into a monster with the mind of Penn's nemesis Rippen.
- SBS's Hyde Jekyll, Me portrays a man, Goo Seo Jin, who is in line as a successor of the conglomerate group his family owns but has dissociative identity disorder. His other personality, Robin, is the opposite of his usual cold, cynical self; Robin is kind, gentle and has a savior complex.
- Shazad Latif portrays an Anglo-Indian Dr Henry Jekyll on the third season of Penny Dreadful. In the show, Jekyll is the illegitimate child of an English nobleman and an Indian woman. His father abandoned Jekyll and his mother in India, and after Jekyll's mother dies from leprosy, he goes to the University of Cambridge, where he befriends Victor Frankenstein but is ultimately expelled from Cambridge after getting into a fight with a professor due to the professor's racist comments. He then works at Bedlam Hospital, developing a serum to pacify patients and bring out a calm, tame nature. In the last episode of the show, Jekyll's father dies and he inherits his title: Lord Hyde.
- Dr Jekyll and Mr Hyde also appeared in the 2008 TV movie Dr Jekyll and Mr Hyder. This movie takes place in modern times and the role of Henry Jekyll and Edward Hyde is played by Dougray Scott. In this version, Dr Jekyll finds a rare Amazonian flower that is said to be able to separate the soul. Jekyll studies and uses it on himself only for him to transform into Hyde at inopportune times.
- The 2015 TV series Jekyll & Hyde focuses on the illegitimate grandson of Henry Jekyll named Doctor Robert Jekyll who has inherited his grandfather's Hyde personality. While Robert is initially able to control his transformation with pills, as the series unfolds, he learns about various demonic threats to the world, and is forced to harness the superhuman strength he possesses as Hyde to oppose these forces. In the course of the series, Robert Jekyll works with Henry Jekyll's old assistant and even meets Henry Jekyll's lover (and hence his grandmother), although his Hyde persona never gains a first name.
- Dr Jekyll and Mr Hyde appear in Once Upon a Time, with Dr Jekyll portrayed by Hank Harris and Mr Hyde portrayed by Sam Witwer. They first appear in the season five finale episodes "Only You" and "An Untold Story". Jekyll and Hyde are shown as inhabitants of the Land of Untold Stories, who follow the heroes to Storybrooke while emigrating the inhabitants of the Land of Untold Stories to Storybrooke as well. They originally came from the Victorian England world until Jekyll accidentally killed their love interest. In season six, Mr Hyde strikes up an allegiance with Regina Mills' Evil Queen side. Jekyll's serum failed to remove his capacity for evil and he is killed by Captain Hook which causes Hyde to die as well as a side effect of the serum.
- Dr Jekyll and Mr Hyde appear in Mary Shelley's Frankenhole, as a minor character who only appears in a few episodes. In the show, he is depicted as a pharmacist in the village that Victor Frankenstein's castle overlooks. He constantly seeks the approval Frankenstein, who views Jekyll as nothing more than an annoyance. Jekyll rarely transforms into Mr Hyde, though when he does, Hyde usually will only make stereotypical sexist comments towards female characters. Like the novel, Jekyll does not need the serum to transform into Hyde, as in one episode, Victor manages to get Jekyll to turn into Hyde by mocking him.
- The TV series Wednesday features a race of creatures called Hydes who are mutated outcasts. It would take a traumatic event or a hypnosis from someone to cause a person's Hyde form to emerge. In addition, Uncle Fester is shown to have knowledge of the Hydes. If a Hyde's master is killed, the Hyde starts to slowly die. Tyler Galpin (portrayed by Hunter Doohan in human form and motion-captured by Daniel Himschoot) and his thought-to-be-dead mother Francoise (portrayed by Frances O'Connor in human form) are known Hydes.

=== Film ===
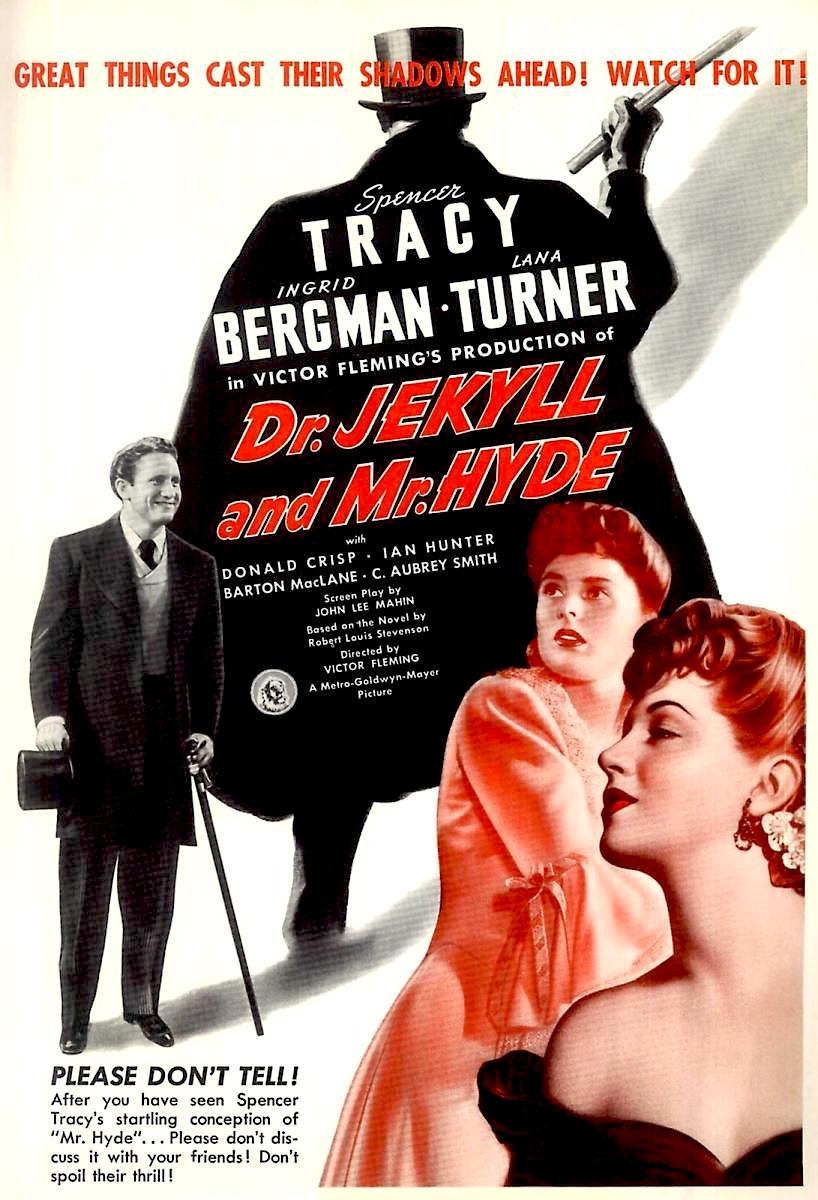
Poster for the 1941 Victor Fleming film

- Fredric March played Jekyll and Hyde in the 1931 film adaptation of the novel, for which he won the Academy Award for Best Actor.
- Dr Jekyll and Mr Hyde appear as the antagonists in the 1953 short film Spooks! starring The Three Stooges. Here, the duo are two separate characters. This Dr Jekyll is a mad scientist who kidnaps a woman to transplant her brain with that of a gorilla while Mr Hyde is his assistant. Dr Jekyll was portrayed by Philip Van Zandt while Mr Hyde was portrayed by Tom Kennedy.
- Dr Jekyll and Mr Hyde appear in Mad Monster Party?, voiced by Allen Swift. Dr Jekyll and Mr Hyde appear as guests at a party thrown by Baron Boris von Frankenstein at his castle on the Isle of Evil. Dr Jekyll keeps his elixir in his cane whenever he wants to turn into Mr Hyde. Also, Dr Jekyll's cane doubles as an umbrella as seen when Mr Hyde uses it to keep the sleeping Creature from spewing water onto him at night.
- Bernie Casey played a blaxploitation version of Jekyll and Hyde in Dr Black, Mr Hyde.
- Dr Jekyll and Mr Hyde appear in Mad, Mad, Mad Monsters (a "prequel of sorts" to Mad Monster Party?), voiced again by Allen Swift. Dr Jekyll appears as a therapist that the mail carrier Harvey visits after delivering the invitations to the wedding of the Monster and his bride at the Transylvania Astoria Hotel. At the end of the film, Harvey visits Dr Jekyll again. This time, Dr Jekyll drinks his serum and becomes Mr Hyde. As the credits roll, Harvey is chased by Mr Hyde who is joined by the other monsters. The bellhop Norman joins the chase in order to get Mr Hyde's autograph.
- David Hemmings played the characters in the 1980 version, but instead of transforming into a hideous being, he becomes younger and very physically attractive. Even though he still does evil things, he seems to be more of a gentlemen at times and less remorseless than other versions of this character. The movie was only made for TV.
- Mark Blankfield played Jekyll and Hyde in the 1982 comedy Jekyll and Hyde... Together Again, wherein Jekyll discovers a white powder that unleashes the animal in every man and in his case transforming him from a shy and timid doctor into Hyde, a sex-crazed party animal.
- In the Hammer Horror film Dr Jekyll and Sister Hyde, Dr Jekyll (portrayed by Ralph Bates), rather than transforming into a deformed monster, transforms into a beautiful yet malicious femme fatale (portrayed by Martine Beswick), his goal in this instance being to find a means of extending life rather than dividing man's good and evil natures from each other.
- Mr Hyde appears in The Nightmare Before Christmas, voiced by Randy Crenshaw. He appears as one of the citizens of Halloween Town. Only seen in his "Hyde" form, he keeps two smaller versions of himself underneath his hat.
- Anthony Perkins played Jekyll and Hyde in the 1989 slasher film Edge of Sanity.
- Dr Jekyll and Mr Hyde appear in the 1994 film The Pagemaster, voiced by Leonard Nimoy. Richard, Adventure, Fantasy, and Horror encounter Dr Jekyll in the horror section of the Written World. He transforms into Mr Hyde during the encounter and attacks the group. Fantasy was able to break the chandelier that fell onto Mr Hyde and sent him falling through the floor. When Richard encounters the Pagemaster again, Dr Jekyll is among the book characters that appear in the magical twister to congratulate him.
- The film The League of Extraordinary Gentlemen (adapted from the comic book series) features Jason Flemyng as both Dr Jekyll and Mr Hyde (the latter using prosthetic makeup to appear as a Hulk-esque version of the character with superhuman strength). Dr Jekyll and Mr Hyde are employed by The League of Extraordinary Gentlemen to combat the ruthless criminal known as the Fantom, who is revealed in the course of the film to be "M", the man who recruited them, and also Professor Moriarty, who intends to acquire the power of the League for use in his plans to trigger a world war and sell his weapons for profit. His mole in the League, Dorian Gray, manages to acquire a sample of the Hyde serum, which he is able to duplicate, one of Moriarty's men drinking a massive overdose of the Hyde serum to become an even larger version of Hyde. Despite the other Hyde's size and raw power, he is defeated when he burns through the formula at an accelerated rate, resulting in Moriarty's fortress collapsing on top of him.
- Dr Jekyll and Mr Hyde appear in Van Helsing, with Dr Jekyll portrayed by Stephen Fisher while Robbie Coltrane provides the voice of the animated Mr Hyde. Like the version that was seen in The League of Extraordinary Gentlemen, Mr Hyde is also portrayed as a large, hulking brute. Van Helsing has pursued Hyde to Paris after having failed to capture him in an earlier confrontation in London, England. He is superhumanly strong and displays agility comparable to that of a great ape. While not invulnerable, he is extremely tough and sustains severe injuries that ultimately do little to impede or slow him down to any appreciable degree. Upon exchanging banter, they begin fighting in the bell tower of Notre Dame Cathedral with Van Helsing initially gaining the advantage by severing Hyde's left arm at the biceps, which regresses to a normal form after landing on the floor. Hyde rallies and assaults Van Helsing, using his right arm to hurl him through the roof of the cathedral. He then gloats before tossing Van Helsing off the roof only for Van Helsing to fire a grappling gun that sends the hook & line through the center of Hyde's body, which Van Helsing uses to stop his fall. He attempts to pull Hyde off the roof, only for Hyde to begin pulling him upward, seemingly unfazed by the large hole in his body. Hyde trips over the edge of the roof, his falling weight pulling Van Helsing up to the roof before the line breaks. As it breaks, the momentum swings Hyde through the Rose Window of the cathedral and, while he falls, Hyde transforms back into the form of Henry Jekyll and dies from the fall. A police officer spots Van Helsing on top of the cathedral and holds him accountable for Dr Jekyll's death.
  - Jekyll and Hyde appear in an animated midquel Van Helsing: The London Assignment where Coltrane reprises the voice of Hyde while Jekyll is voiced by Dwight Schultz.
  - The novelization of the film portrays Hyde as not only a murderer, but a cannibal as well. The novel says the body of the murdered woman Van Helsing discovers on the streets of Paris as partially devoured while the same scene in the film shows the woman's body intact. However, the film does suggest that Hyde is cannibalistic when he encounters Van Helsing in Notre Dame and tells him "You're a big one. You'll be hard to digest." In the Game Version, Hyde tells Van Helsing that he is responsible for the murders and digestion of several people including children.
- The Ghost of Mr Hyde made a cameo in Scooby-Doo! and the Goblin King as a patron in a monster bar.
- The Dynomutt version of Mr Hyde appeared in Scooby-Doo! Mask of the Blue Falcon, voiced by John DiMaggio.
- Russell Crowe played Dr Jekyll in The Mummy, which is the first and only installment in Universal's Dark Universe and is a role which would have been elaborated on in further films within the series. It is suggested that Jekyll's transformation into Hyde was a "natural" condition, as he reflects on how someone- implied to be him- realized that he was succumbing to evil but was able to find a cure as a physician, requiring regular injections of an unspecified compound to prevent himself becoming Hyde, an aggressive and sadistic persona. Despite the personality transformation, Dr Jekyll and Mr Hyde have the same appearance with the exception of their skin and eyes, although they also have a different palm print with the result that palm scanners that will allow Jekyll access will prohibit Hyde from using the same door. As Hyde, he exhibits greater levels of physical strength, endurance and aggression as well as improved combat abilities.
- Henry Jekyll, better known as Edward "Eddy" Hyde, was mentioned many times in the 2022 live action film on Monster High. After he was expelled from Monster High because of his human half, Eddie Hyde worked on a formula to make him more monstrous. Unfortunately, he never got around to using it due to the fact that he was killed by the monster hunters. Eddy Hyde was revealed to have a son named Edward "Eddy" Hyde Jr. who went under the alias Mr Komos and sought out his father's work.

=== Comics ===
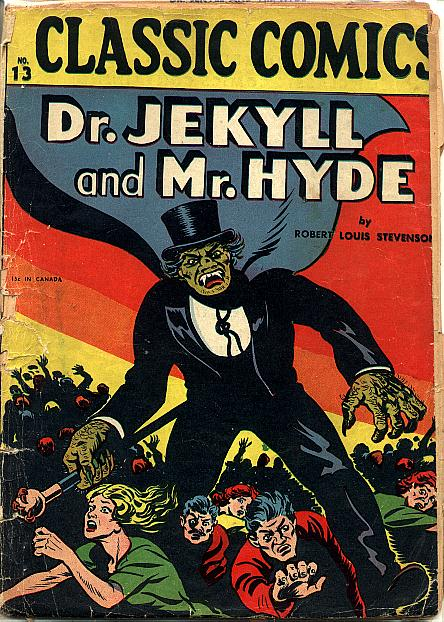
A 1950s Classic Comics #13 featuring Mr Hyde on the cover.

- Dr Jekyll and Mr Hyde appeared in a Classic Comics adaption of the story that was featured in issue #13.
- Mr Hyde appeared in issue #4 of Kid Eternity where he alongside Frankenstein's monster from Frankenstein, Count Dracula from Dracula, the Thief of Bagdad from One Hundred and One Nights, and Jimmy Skunk from Thornton W. Burgess' Old Mother West Wind were summoned by Kid Eternity to deal with the remaining Mackey Musclers member.
- In The League of Extraordinary Gentlemen, Volume One and Volume Two by Alan Moore and Kevin O'Neill, Henry Jekyll is a scientist who is the lesser half of Edward Hyde and member of the Victorian League.

=== Music ===
- The Who recorded the song "Dr Jekyll and Mr Hyde" on their album Magic Bus: The Who on Tour.
- Renaissance recorded the song "Jekyll and Hyde" on their album Azure d'Or.
- The Damned recorded a song titled "Dr Jekyll and Mr Hyde" on their 1980 release The Black Album.
- Dr Jeckyll & Mr Hyde was a 1980s hip hop group.
- The split personality theme – I am to myself what Jekyll must have been to Hyde – is featured in ABBA song "Me and I" (1980).
- Men at Work parodied the two names somewhat for their 1983 hit song, "Dr Heckyll & Mr Jive."
- Miroslav Žbirka (a popular artist from Czechoslovakia, later Slovakia) recorded the song "Dr Jekyll Mr Hyde" on his 1986 Album Chlapec z ulice
- Ozzy Osbourne portrayed a scientist similar to Dr Jekyll in the music video for Bark at the Moon from his 1983 album of the same name.
- South Korean boy band VIXX released their first mini-album, Hyde, and first repackaged mini album, Jekyll, based on the novel.
- Diamond Rio released a country music version of Dr Jekyll and Mr Hyde with their single "Bubba Hyde" in 1995.
- In 1998, the song, "Jekyll Jekyll Hyde," was featured on the TV show Arthur in the season three episode, "Arthur's Almost Live Not Real Music Festival."
- Heavy metal band Judas Priest released a song entitled "Jekyll and Hyde" on their 2001 album Demolition.
- Another heavy metal band, Iced Earth, released a song entitled "Jekyll & Hyde" on their 2001 album, Horror Show.
- In 2002, Peruvian band Dr Jekyll from San Miguel, Lima, Perú, record his demo "Sr. Crioll Rock". It also included song "Dr jekyll" in two versions.
- American Christian Rock band Petra recorded a song "Jekyll & Hyde" for their 2003 album with the same name.
- Scarlet Room recorded a song entitled "Hello to Hyde" in 2006.
- American rock band Halestorm released an album in 2012 called The Strange Case Of..., with a track called "Mz. Hyde". The title of the album and song is referencing singer Lzzy Hale's on stage and off stage sides to her life.
- In 2010, Lara Fabian released a song "Mademoiselle Hyde" on her album Mademoiselle Zhivago, composed by Igor Krutoy. In 2019, the song was rearranged by Igor Krutoy and sung by Dimash Kudaibergen.
- In 2015, Five Finger Death Punch released a single named "Jekyll & Hyde".
- Ice Nine Kills released the single "Me, Myself & Hyde" in February 2015.
- Zac Brown Band released the album Jekyll + Hyde in 2015.
- In 2015, artist Jonathan Thulin released a single called "Jekyll & Hyde".
- In 2019, artist Bishop Briggs released the song "Jekyll & Hyde" as the third track to the album Champion.
- In 2019, K-pop group Exo released the song "Jekyll" in their sixth album Obsession.

=== Stage ===
The story was adapted into a stage musical simply titled Jekyll & Hyde, with music by Frank Wildhorn and book by Leslie Bricusse. It premiered on May 24, 1990, at the Alley Theatre in Houston, Texas, with Chuck Wagner playing the title role(s) and Linda Eder as Lucy Harris. The stage version includes several character changes: Jekyll believes the evil in man is the reason for his father's mental deficiencies and is the driving force of his work; he is also engaged to Sir Danvers' daughter, Emma, while her former lover, Simon Stride, is still longing for her affections. The musical also features a prostitute named Lucy Harris, who is the object of Hyde's lust. Hyde also murders seven people in the musical: each member of the Board of Governors at the hospital where Jekyll is employed and rejected his work, along with Lucy and Stride. Robert Cuccioli originated the role(s) for the first U.S. tour in 1995, and then in the original Broadway theatre version in 1997. Other notable actors to play the role(s) include: Jack Wagner, Anthony Warlow, Sebastian Bach, David Hasselhoff, Rob Evan, and Constantine Maroulis in the 2013 revival.

=== Miscellaneous ===
- The Lego Minifigures theme has a character in Series 9 named Mr Good and Evil, who is based on Dr Jekyll and Mr Hyde.
- In the original Monster High, there are characters named Jackson Jekyll and Holt Hyde who are the descendants of Dr Jekyll. They are voiced by Cindy Robinson in the webisodes and TV specials.
- In Servamp, a manga written and illustrated by Strike Tanaka, there are two characters known as Licht Jekylland Todoroki and Lawless of Greed (later given the name of Hyde by the former). They have no direct correlation with Dr Jekyll and Mr Hyde in personality traits from the original novel, but their names, as well as their roles as opposites to each other (Licht as an Angel and Hyde as a Demon) nod to the original story. Their combined special attack is titled "Jekyll and Hyde".
- In Fate/Grand Order, a mobile video game based on the Fate/stay night visual novel and franchise from Type-Moon, a Servant under the classes Assassin and Berserker appears, named "Henry Jekyll & Hyde." In most of his appearance during battle sequences, he is the Assassin-class Servant Henry Jekyll, however when using his Noble Phantasm, or special ability, he becomes the Berserker-class Servant Hyde.
- In the BBC radio sketch show John Finnemore's Souvenir Programme, one sketch depicts the relationship between Dr Jekyll and Mr Hyde (played by John Finnemore and Simon Kane respectively) as that of aggrieved flatmates. They enter into a tit-for-tat exchange which ends in begrudging compromise after Jekyll threatens to get a vasectomy.
- In 2016, BBC Radio 4 produced The Strange Case of Dr Jekyll and Mr Hyde, with Stuart McQuarrie as Jekyll, John Dougall as Hyde and Madeleine Worrall as Lorna Utterson This version is presented as a speculative version of what the original Jekyll & Hyde would have been like before Stevenson edited it based on his wife's objections, and introduces the twist of a third identity for Jekyll in the form of George Denman, intended to represent all the most positive aspects of Jekyll's character, only for Denman to regress to Hyde when he loses his temper.
