= Someone like Me =

Someone like Me may refer to:

== Film and television ==
- Someone Like Me (film), 2021 Canadian documentary film
- Someone Like Me (TV series), American TV series

== Songs ==
- "Someone like Me" (song), 2004 song by Atomic Kitten
- "Someone Like Me", 2012 song by Ylvis
- "Someone Like Me", by the Sherman Brothers from the 2000 film The Tigger Movie

== Other uses ==
- Someone Like Me (novel), 1996 novel by Elaine Forrestal

== See also ==
- "...Someone Like Me as a Member", episode of The Good Place
- Somebody Like Me (disambiguation)
- Someone like You (disambiguation)
