= Unnaipol Oruvan =

Unnaipol Oruvan (transl. Man Like You – transl. Someone like You in Tamil) may refer to:

- Unnaipol Oruvan, a novel by Indian writer Jayakanthan
  - Unnaipol Oruvan (1965 film), an Indian film directed by Jayakanthan
- Unnaipol Oruvan (2009 film), an Indian film directed by Chakri Toleti

== See also ==
- Someone Like You (disambiguation)
