= Somebody Like Me =

Somebody Like Me may refer to:

- Somebody Like Me (album), a 1966 album by Eddy Arnold
- "Somebody Like Me" (Eddy Arnold song), 1966
- "Somebody Like Me" (Silkk the Shocker song), 1999
- "Somebody Like Me" (Samantha Mumba song), 2013

== See also ==
- Someone like Me (disambiguation)
