= Brandi Chavonne Massey =

American stage actress and singer (born 1979)

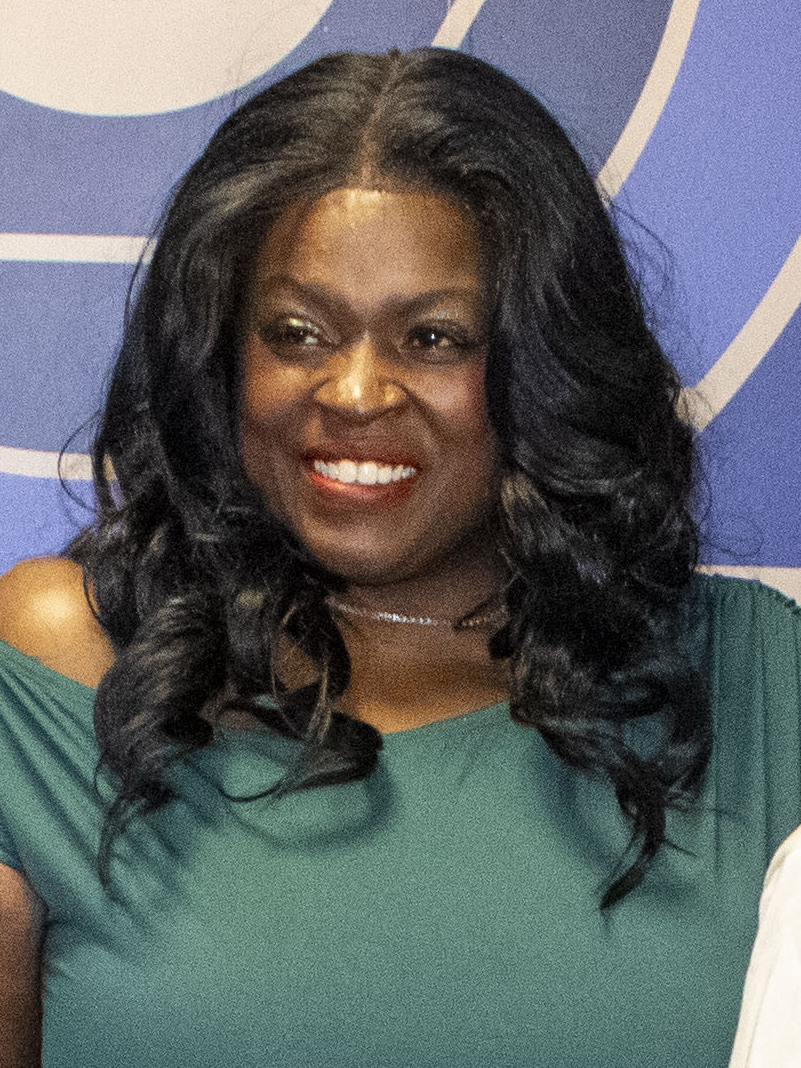
- Massey in 2025
- Born: Brandi Chavonne Massey; August 12, 1979 (age 47); Cincinnati, Ohio

Brandi Chavonne Massey (August 12, 1979) is an American stage actress and singer.

She graduated from The School for Creative and Performing Arts in Cincinnati, Ohio. She made her Broadway debut in the 1997 production of Jekyll and Hyde as an ensemble member and Lucy understudy. Since then, Massey has starred in the Broadway productions of Caroline, or Change (as "The Radio") and Wicked (as an ensemble member, understudying the role of Elphaba). She also worked in The Lion King's London production as the lioness Nala from 2002 to 2003. Her Off-Broadway credits include: Ghetto Superstar, Carmen Jones, and Caroline, or Change as well as the Encores! production of Hair. Massey left Wicked on December 17, 2006, to concentrate on recording an album. Massey is currently touring around North America with the National tour of Oprah Winfrey's "The Color Purple" understudying the characters of Celie and Nettie. Brandi starred as "Mary Magdeline" in Jesus Christ Superstar at North Carolina Theatre in Raleigh, NC from February 24 – March 4, 2007. Brandi starred at Lorell in the Atlanta production of Dreamgirls at The Fox Theatre from July 18–29, 2007 alongside Original Broadway Cast member Jennifer Holliday.
