= Rob Evan =

American actor and singer

Robert Evan
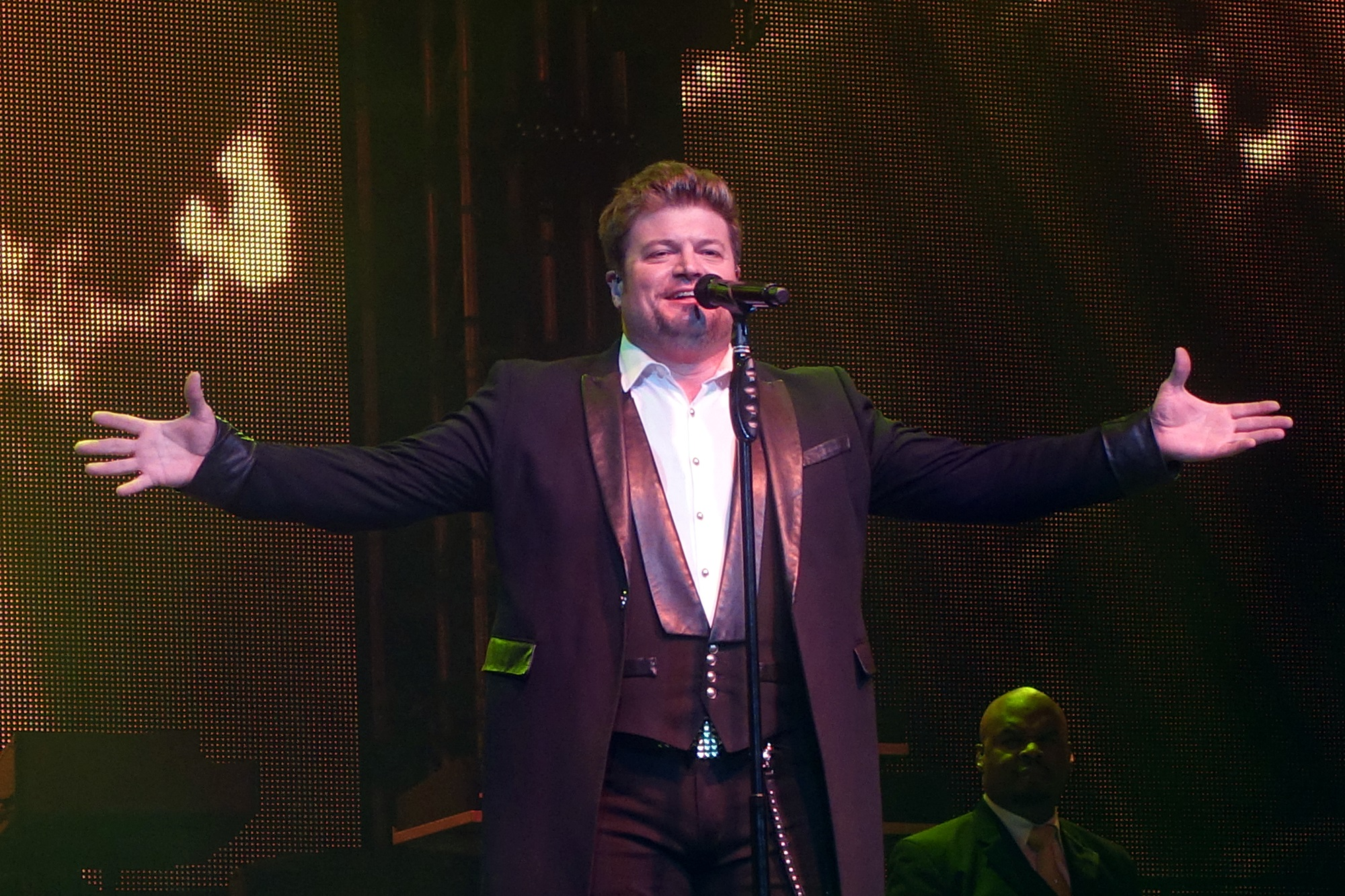
- Evan performing with the Trans-Siberian Orchestra in December 2016
- Born: Robert Buchen; Monticello, Georgia, U.S.
- Other names: Rob Evan
- Education: University of Georgia
- Occupations: Singer, actor, football player
- Years active: 1990-present
- Known for: Jekyll & Hyde
- Children: 3
- Website: www.rob-evan.com

Robert Buchen known professionally as Robert "Rob" Evan is an American actor and singer, best known as the lead performer in numerous Broadway musicals, a performer in national and international tours of musical productions, and a featured vocalist on various music albums.

== Personal life ==
Evan, a native of Monticello, Georgia, said in a personal interview:

"I grew up in Monticello, Georgia, and I was a football player at UGA, and that's the first time I saw Les Mis — twenty years ago here at the Fox. It just made me go, I want to do this for a living. I was just a business major, I had wanted to go to law school, but this show lit the fire... I ended up auditioning at a Les Mis open call 'a la American Idol' two years later. I waited ten hours to sing sixteen bars of Stars. He walked out with the proverbial gold ticket. 'I thought it was going to be instant stardom and cash, not knowing any better."

In 1989, he was the first recipient of the Georgia Music Hall of Fame Talent Award. He walked on to the varsity football team as a kicker/punter at the University of Georgia, where he majored in Finance and graduated with a Bachelor of Business Administration (BBA) in 1990.

== Family ==
He met his ex-wife, Beate, while working on a cruise ship as one of four lead singers in a musical review. Beate is originally from Norway. Shortly after his time on the ship, he moved to New York City to pursue a career on Broadway. During his early days in New York City, Evan waited tables in Times Square. He and Beate have three children.

== Musical theater ==
After a few community theater roles, Evan's first professional role was in the ensemble for South Pacific in Atlanta, Georgia in 1990.

Evan performed in the 1995 US tour of Jekyll & Hyde as Theo Davenport. Most notably, he played the title roles in the original Broadway production of Jekyll & Hyde for over three years, from the years 1997 until 2000, and over 600 performances. One of his performances was professionally recorded as a rehearsal for the DVD version with David Hasselhoff and is currently available on YouTube. Evan has continued to perform in touring productions of the show, appearing alongside Linda Eder, Luba Mason, Coleen Sexton, Christiane Noll, Anastasia Barzee and Andrea Rivette, as his leading ladies.

He appeared in multiple productions of Les Misérables, including on Broadway and at the Fox Theater in Atlanta, Georgia. His roles include Jean Valjean and Enjolras.

Off-Broadway, he created the roles of "The Dancin' Kid" in Johnny Guitar, and "Miles Hendon" in the musical The Prince and the Pauper.

In 2004, he played "Orin Scrivello" in Little Shop of Horrors with Joey Fatone on Broadway.

He also performed the role of the Count von Krolock in the Broadway show called Dance of the Vampires at the Minskoff Theatre in 2002. This show is separate and very different from the show by that name that has been performed in Europe and elsewhere. An understudy to Michael Crawford, he did perform the role on stage for at least one show. He originated the role of Nanki-Poo in the TUTS/Pittsburgh CLO premiere of the Hot Mikado.

Other musicals in which he has appeared include Hello, Dolly!, By George!, Three Penny, Jesus Christ Superstar, Brigadoon, Desert Song, Chess, The Civil War, and others.

He has been in a touring show, The Music of Andrew Lloyd Webber, and Neil Berg's 100 Years of Broadway.

On March 26, 2007, he began performing as "Kerchak" in the Disney Broadway musical Tarzan. He played his final performance on July 8, 2007, when the show closed.

In August 2014, he joined the cast of Atomic, an off-Broadway musical about the Manhattan Project, as Ernest Rutherford and Arthur Compton.

== Trans-Siberian Orchestra ==
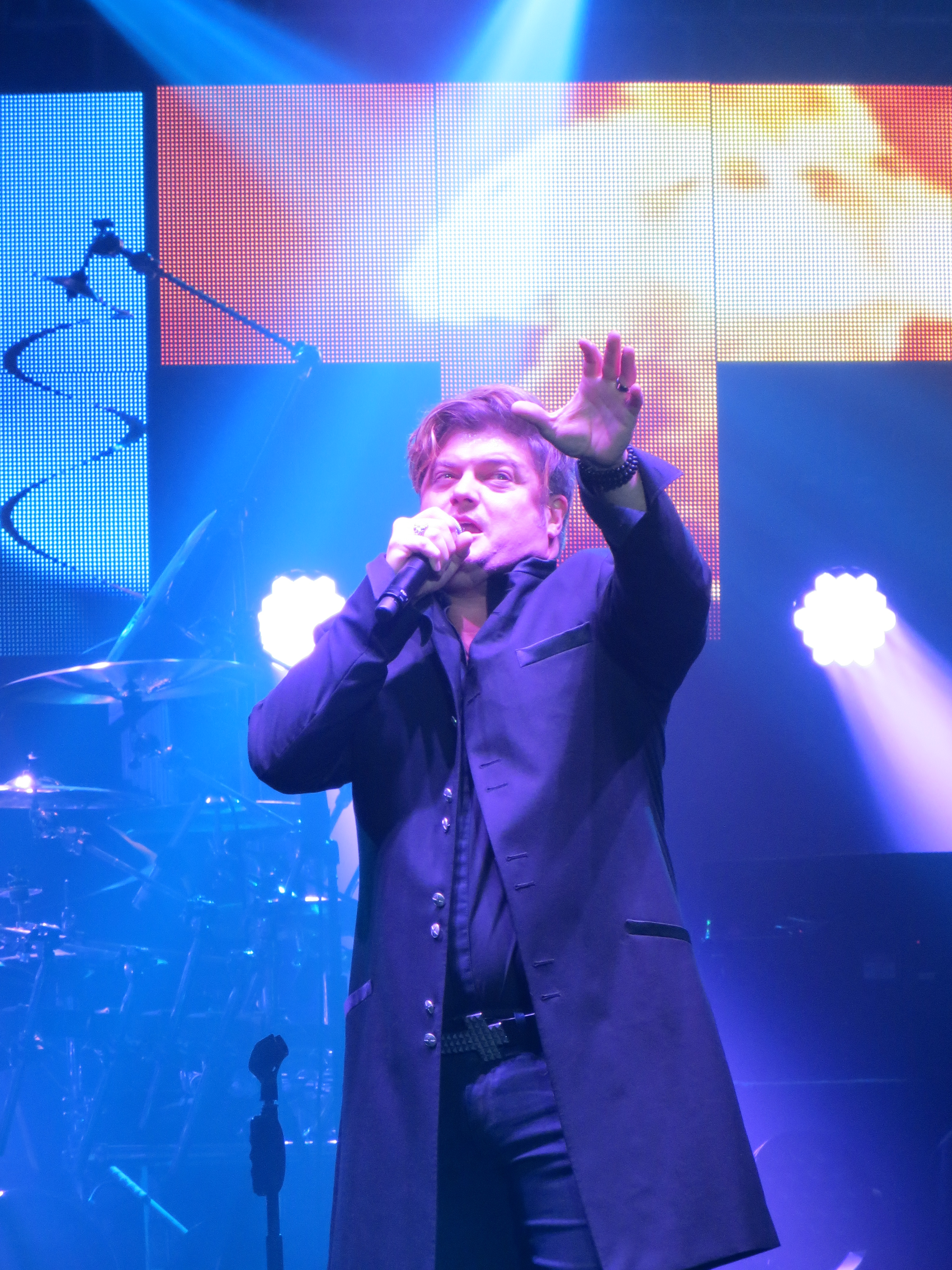
Rob Evan performing with the Trans-Siberian Orchestra in 2014

Evan can be heard on Trans-Siberian Orchestra's albums The Lost Christmas Eve ("What Is Christmas?", "Back to a Reason Part II", and "What Child Is This?") and Night Castle ("There Was a Life", "Epiphany"). In an interview Evan said, "Paul has really been brilliant in the way he handled that band. I have three platinum records on my wall because of him. In fact, the house they’re hanging in is because of the last TSO record we did", referring to Paul O'Neill. Evan has also toured live with TSO, singing "This Is Who You Are" in 2001; "An Angel Came Down", "An Angel Returned", and "The World That He Sees" in 2003; "An Angel Came Down" and "An Angel Returned" in 2009; "What is Christmas?", "Back to a Reason Part II", and "What Child Is This?" in winter 2012 and 2013; "Epiphany" and "Mephistopheles' Return" in spring 2014; "The World That He Sees" and "Christmas in the Air" in winter 2014; "What Child Is This?" in winter 2015 and 2016; as well as playing the part of Beethoven on TSO's spring 2010, 2011, and 2012 tours. Evan's vocals garnered him rave reviews from both TSO fans and musical critics. "Hard Rock Magazine," not only lauded him for his portrayal of the legendary composer in Beethoven's Last Night performed in 2011 in Beethoven's home town of Vienna, Austria but also noted that he had "the best songs on "Night Castle," (Epiphany and There was a Life) were not his by chance."

== The Dream Engine ==
Evan was one of the two lead vocalists for The Dream Engine, a music performance group that performed the music of Jim Steinman. This project has not performed or been active in public since 2006, aside from having a website and Myspace page.

At live shows for The Dream Engine, Evan has performed solo vocals on the songs "What Part of My Body Hurts The Most", "(It Hurts) Only When I Feel", "Is Nothing Sacred", "Two Out of Three Ain't Bad", "For Crying Out Loud" and "Speaking In Tongues". As duets with Adrienne Warren, he has performed the songs "Not Allowed to Love" and the revised "Braver Than We Are" (alternate titles have been "An American Elegy" and "God's Gone AWOL"). He has performed "Loving You's a Dirty Job but Somebody's Gotta Do It" as a duet with Bonnie Tyler and Elaine Caswell. He performed one of three vocal parts in "Objects in the Rear View Mirror May Appear Closer than They Are", and one of the four vocal parts in "We're Still the Children We Once Were". In 2005, before The Dream Engine had officially formed, Evan performed at a set of shows called Over the Top, featuring the music of Jim Steinman. In addition to some of the songs mentioned above, he also performed at these shows "I'd Do Anything for Love (But I Won't Do That)", "Heaven Can Wait", "A Kiss Is a Terrible Thing to Waste", "Read 'Em and Weep", "Rock and Roll Dreams Come Through" and the original "Braver Than We Are".

== Rocktopia ==
Evan co-created with Maestro Randall Craig Fleischer Rocktopia, a mix of classical music and classic rock, which in March 2018 began a six-week run at the Broadway Theatre. Its featured vocalists include Evan, Alyson Cambridge, Chloe Lowery, Kimberly Nichole, and Tony Vincent, as well as Celtic violinist Máiréad Nesbitt, guitarist Tony Bruno, a 5-piece rock band, a 20-piece orchestra, and a 40-member choir.

== Recordings ==
Evan's voice can be heard on multiple recordings, including Trans-Siberian Orchestra’s The Lost Christmas Eve and Night Castle (Lava/Atlantic), Jekyll & Hyde (OBC/Atlantic), The Broadway Musicals of 1940 (BayView), The Prince and the Pauper (OOBC/JAY), Johnny Guitar (OOBC), Jekyll & Hyde: Resurrection (KOCH/Globalvision), Dracula (KOCH/Globalvision), the soundtrack to Neil Berg's 100 Years of Broadway (Left Field Productions), and Menrva Realm's Angels (Ectronia).

In 2005/06 he did vocal work on studio recordings intended for The Dream Engine. Sample clips from "Nowhere Fast" and "Is Nothing Sacred" were posted to the Internet, but the album was never released.

== Other appearances ==
Evan performed at the 2001 Inaugural Gala for President George W. Bush, the Millennium Independence Day US Naval Revue aboard the USS JFK for President Clinton, the Millennium World Forum Conference with guest speaker Mikhail Gorbachev, the 1998 Goodwill Games, the New York City Mayor’s Inaugural Gala, the 1998 and 1999 NY Yankees World Series Celebration at City Hall, The Georgia Music Hall of Fame Awards Telecast in September 2006, The Today Show, and Monday Night Football.

In 2008, Evan sang the song "If I Should Lose My Way" as a duet with Trisha Yearwood, and the song "The Last Waltz for Dixie" as a solo, in a show of songs and dialog from Frank Wildhorn's The Civil War. President George W. Bush and First Lady Laura Bush were present. The show was done to benefit the Ford's Theater in Washington, D.C.

In 2009, he performed in The Rock Tenor, which featured Patti Russo, and in Classic M: The Music of Motown, USA. While appearing in The Rock Tenor shows, Evan performed the song "Paradise by the Dashboard Light" as a duet with Russo.

He has appeared in the soap opera All My Children on ABC.

== Notable theatre roles ==
Show	Role(s)	Year(s)	Production
South Pacific	Ensemble	1990	Atlanta, Georgia
Hello, Dolly!	Ensemble	1992	Houston, Texas
Les Miserables	Jean Prouvaire; Enjolras (Understudy)	1992-93	3rd US Tour
Hot Mikado	Nanki-Poo	1994	Pittsburgh, Pennsylvania
Chess	Anatoly Sergievsky	1995	Miami, Florida
Les Miserables	Brujon	1995	Broadway
Jekyll & Hyde	Theo Davenport Dr. Henry Jekyll (Understudy) Mr. Edward Hyde (Understudy)	1995-1996	1st US Tour
Les Miserables	Courfeyrac; Jean Valjean (understudy)	1996	Broadway
Les Miserables	Jean Valjean	1996-1997	Broadway & 3rd US Tour
Jekyll & Hyde	Dr. Henry Jekyll (Alternate) Mr. Edward Hyde (Alternate)	1997-1999	Broadway
Chess	Anatoly Sergievsky	1998	NY Concert
Jekyll & Hyde	Dr. Henry Jekyll Mr. Edward Hyde	1999-2000	Broadway
Jekyll & Hyde	Dr. Henry Jekyll (Alternate) Mr. Edward Hyde (Alternate)	2000-2001	Broadway
Chess	Anatoly Sergievsky	2001	Nyack, New York
The Prince and the Pauper	Miles Henton	2002	Off-Broadway
Dance of the Vampires	Count Giovanni Von Krolock(Standby) Professor Abronsius(Standby)	2002-2003	Broadway
Johnny Guitar	The Dancin' Kid	2004	Off-Broadway
Little Shop of Horrors	Orin Scrivello & Others	2004	Broadway
Tarzan	Kerchak	2007	Broadway
Bonnie & Clyde	Clyde	2008	Demo Cast Album
Les Miserables	Jean Valjean	2008-2009	Theatre Under the Stars Tour
Les Miserables	Jean Valjean	2013	Flat Rock, North Carolina
Atomic: The Musical	Ernest Rutherford Arthur Compton	2014	Off-Broadway
Rocktopia	Vocalist & Co-Creator	2016	Budapest, Hungary(World Premiere)
Rocktopia	Vocalist & Co-Creator	2018	Broadway
Rocktopia	Vocalist & Co-Creator	2019	US Tour

== Discography ==
Title	Role(s)(If Applicable)	Year	Type of Album/Artist
The Civil War	"Broadway All-Stars"	1996	Concept Album
Jekyll & Hyde	Dr. Henry Jekyll Mr. Edward Hyde	1998	Highlights Album
Z. The Masked Musical	The Governor	1998	Concept Album
Dracula, the Musical	Jonathan Harker	2000	Demo Album
The Prince and the Pauper	Miles Henton	2002	Original Off-Broadway Cast Album
Dracula, the Musical	Jonathan Harker	2004	Broadway Promo Album
Dracula, the Musical	Jonathan Harker	2005	Non-Commercial Concept Album
Johnny Guitar: The Musical	The Dancin' Kid	2004	Original Off-Broadway Cast Album
The Lost Christmas Eve	N/A	2004	Trans-Siberian Orchestra
Jekyll & Hyde: Resurrection	Dr. Henry Jekyll Mr. Edward Hyde	2005	Cast Album
Cyrano de Bergerac	Christian	2006	Concept Album
Night Castle	N/A	2009	Trans-Siberian Orchestra
Dracula, the Musical	Jonathan Harker	2011	Studio Cast Recordings
Tears of Heavan	Joon	2011	Concept Album
The Broadway Musicals of 1940	N/A	2017	Original Cast Recording
Angels	N/A	2018	Menrva Realm
