= Anastasia Barzee =

American actress and singer

- Occupations: Actress, singer
- Years active: 1989–present
- Notable work: The Dimming of the Day
- Website: anastasiabarzee.com

Anastasia Barzee is an American Broadway and West End actress.

== Career ==
Barzee originated the role of Betty Haynes in White Christmas (2004-2006 tour). She also originated the role of Josephine in the West End cast of Napoleon (2000), opposite Paul Baker and Uwe Kröger, and the role of Lady Mortimer in the Broadway production of Henry IV (a combination of Part 1 and Part 2), directed by Jack O'Brien starring Kevin Kline, Audra McDonald, and Dana Ivey.

Barzee was a replacement in the Broadway production of Jekyll & Hyde, as Emma Carew. She starred from January 1999 until January 2000 opposite Rob Evan and Luba Mason. She also appeared as Hope in the Broadway cast of Urinetown (2002–2003) and also as Ellen in the Broadway and touring cast of Miss Saigon (1995–1998). She was also in the Los Angeles cast and national tours of both City of Angels (as Mallory/Avril in 1991) and Sunset Boulevard (as an understudy Betty in 1993). In 2002, she played Beth in Merrily We Roll Along at the Kennedy Center.

Barzee has appeared on television in shows including Law & Order: Special Victims Unit, Law & Order, Get a Life, Murder She Wrote, Designing Women and Herman's Head. She appeared in the 2010 feature film Fair Game, opposite Sean Penn, directed by Doug Liman.

She can be heard on the cast recordings of Napoleon (Original London Cast) and the White Christmas World Premiere Stage Recording. Her debut Album, The Dimming of the Day was released in 2011 on Ghostlight Records.

In 2023, she participated in theater, including The King and I Mr. Holland's Opus.

== Filmography ==
=== Film ===
Year	Title	Role	Notes
2010	Fair Game	Right Wing Reporter	
2017	Confessions of a Teenage Jesus Jerk	Laura	
2022	She Said	Lisa Bloom	
TBA	Those Who Wander	Annabelle	

=== Television ===
Year	Title	Role	Notes
1989	B.L. Stryker	Delivery Girl	2 episodes
1989	Designing Women	Student #1	Episodes: "Manhunt"
1990, 1991	Get a Life	May Evans / Jane	2 episodes
1991	Dream On	Coed #1	Episode: "The Second Greatest Story Ever Told"
1993	Evening Shade	Verona	Episode: "Ava Takes a Shower: Part 1"
1993	Herman's Head	Margie	2 episodes
1994	Days of Our Lives	Valerie	5 episodes
2000	Murder, She Wrote: A Story to Die For	Lorraine	Television film
2007	Law & Order	Claudia Murphy	Episode: "Good Faith"
2009, 2018	Law & Order: Special Victims Unit	Various roles	2 episodes
2011	White Collar	Marjorie	Episode: "Taking Account"
2011	Blue Bloods	Elizabeth Fox	Episode: "Innocence"
2012	666 Park Avenue	Diane	Episode: "A Crowd of Demons"
2012	Made in Jersey	Frances	Episode: "Ridgewell"
2013	Golden Boy	Linda Taylor	Episode: "Sacrifice"
2013	The Blacklist	Staff Lawyer	Episode: "The Freelancer (No. 145)"
2015	Elementary	Erin Chatworth	Episode: "When Your Number's Up"
2015	The Mysteries of Laura	Beth Evans	Episode: "The Mystery of the Watery Grave"
2015, 2016	Younger	Claire	2 episodes
2016	Beauty & the Beast	Special Agent Olivia Dylan	5 episodes
2016	The Affair	Trish	Episode #3.2
2016	Madam Secretary	Suzanne	Episode: "Tectonic Shift"
2018	Seven Seconds	Evelyn	2 episodes
2019	The Society	Karen Bingham	Episode: "What Happened?"
2020	FBI	Lila Robbins	Episode: "Fallout"
2020	Hunters	Annika Bauman	Episode: "(Ruth 1:16)"
2022	Inventing Anna	Adrienne Stanley	Episode: "Cash on Delivery"
2022	The Good Fight	Dr. Alyssa Schuman	2 episodes
2025	Grey's Anatomy	Leah Caraway	Episode: "Bust Your Windows"
2025	Boston Blue	Naomi Ballard	Episode: "Teammates"
