= Robert Cuccioli =

American actor and singer

- Born: May 3, 1958 (age 68); Hempstead, New York, United States
- Other name: Bob Cuccioli
- Occupations: Actor; singer; director
- Years active: 1984–present
- Known for: Jekyll & Hyde
- Partner: Laila Robins (2000–present)
- Awards: Drama Desk Award for Outstanding Actor in a Musical (1997); Outer Critics Circle Award for Outstanding Actor in a Musical (1997)
- Website: www.robertcuccioli.com

Robert Cuccioli (born May 3, 1958) is an American actor and singer. He is best known for originating the lead dual title roles in the musical Jekyll & Hyde, for which he received a Tony Award nomination and won the Joseph Jefferson Award, the Outer Critics Circle Award, the Drama Desk Award, and the Fany Award for outstanding actor in a musical.

After beginning his career Off-Broadway at the Light Opera of Manhattan in the 1980s, Cuccioli starred as Lancelot du Lac in national tours of Camelot in 1987 and first appeared on Broadway in 1993 as Javert in Les Misérables. He has appeared in numerous New York and regional productions since then, including his long-running stints on Broadway in Jekyll & Hyde (1997–1999) and as the Green Goblin in Spider-Man: Turn Off the Dark (2012–2014). Cuccioli has also appeared in films and on television.

== Life and career ==
Cuccioli was born in Hempstead, New York. He attended St. Mary's High School in Manhasset, New York, and college at St. John's University in Jamaica, New York, earning a degree in Finance.

While working as a financial consultant at E. F. Hutton in the earlly 1980s, he joined the off-Broadway Light Opera of Manhattan, where he performed for three years, working his way up to principal roles, such as Count Danilo in The Merry Widow, the Pirate King in The Pirates of Penzance and Captain Corcoran in H.M.S. Pinafore.

=== Broadway and national tours ===
Cuccioli starred as Lancelot de Lac in U.S. and Canadian national tours of Camelot in 1987, with Richard Harris. He first appeared on Broadway as Javert in Les Misérables in 1993 and continued to appear in the musical as a replacement until early January 1995, when he began rehearsals for the pre-Broadway national tour of Jekyll & Hyde. In 1997, Cuccioli was nominated for a Tony Award for his performance in the dual title roles in the musical Jekyll & Hyde, also winning the Joseph Jefferson Award, the Outer Critics Circle Award, the Drama Desk Award and the Fany Award for that role. On September 26, 2005, he starred as Dr. Johnson in the special benefit performance of On the Twentieth Century at the New Amsterdam Theatre.

Cuccioli returned to Broadway beginning August 7, 2012, when he took over from Patrick Page in the dual role of Norman Osborn and his alter ego The Green Goblin in the rock musical Spider-Man: Turn Off the Dark.

=== Off-Broadway and regional theatre ===
Aside from Cuccioli's early tenure at the Light Opera of Manhattan, his other notable off-Broadway appearances include Nathan in the long-running revival of The Rothschilds (1990); the highly successful 1991 Kander and Ebb revue And The World Goes 'Round, which garnered him an Outer Critics Circle Award in 1991; and he played the title role in the Maury Yeston and Arthur Kopit musical Phantom at the Westchester Broadway Theater in 1992–93, a role that he has repeated. In 2000, he played Macheath in The Threepenny Opera. He was also seen as Karl Streber in Temporary Help in 2002 and in Mirette by Harvey Schmidt with York Theatre in 2005.

Cuccioli's U.S. regional theatre credits include Ankles Aweigh at the Goodspeed Opera House in 1988, Jud Fry in Oklahoma! at the Paper Mill Playhouse in 1992, Archibald Craven in the Sacramento Music Circus production of The Secret Garden (1999), The Actor in Enter the Guardsman at the New Jersey Shakespeare Festival (1999 and again off-Broadway in 2000), King Marchan in Victor/Victoria at the Paper Mill in 2000, Nick Arnstein in Funny Girl at the Paper Mill in 2001, Antony in Antony and Cleopatra at the New Jersey Shakespeare Festival (2002), Captain von Trapp in The Sound of Music at the Paper Mill in 2003, and Sky Masterson in Guys and Dolls at the Paper Mill in 2004, with Karen Ziemba and Kate Baldwin. His 2005 theatrical credits include Alexander di Medici in Lorenzaccio at The Shakespeare Theatre in Washington, D.C., and Capt. von Trapp in The Sound of Music at the Bendedum Theatre in Pennsylvania. He has also starred in shows at The Shakespeare Theatre of New Jersey, where he has played the title role in Macbeth (2004), Brutus in Julius Caesar (2005) and Antonio Salieri in Amadeus (2008), among others; at the New York's Equity Library Theatre; and in regional theatres around the United States.

Cuccioli's later stage appearances include the off-Broadway revue Jacques Brel is Alive and Well and Living in Paris in 2006. In June and July 2007, he played Claudius in Hamlet at The Lansburgh Theatre in Washington, D.C., with the Shakespeare Theatre Company. In 2007, he appeared in pre-Broadway tryouts of Lone Star Love in Seattle, starring Randy Quaid, but the Broadway run was cancelled. Later that year he played the title character in Man of La Mancha at the White Plains, New York Performing Arts Center. Cuccioli reprised the title role in Phantom at the Westchester Broadway Theater from December 2007 to February 2008. He also is heard on a concept album for The New Picasso, which was released in 2008. In 2008, he returned to the White Plains Performing Arts Center to play King Arthur in Camelot and starred in Conor McPherson's The Seafarer at George Street Playhouse in New Jersey. In 2009, he starred in Thom Thomas's A Moon to Dance By, at the Pittsburgh Playhouse and at the George Street Playhouse, with Jane Alexander, and played John Dickinson in 1776 at the Paper Mill Playhouse. He reprised the role of Dickinson in 2012 at Ford's Theatre. That same year he played the role of Anatoly Sergievsky in Chess at Lincoln Center.

In 2015, with York Theatre, he starred as Mayer Rothschild in Rothschild & Sons, a reworking of The Rothschilds. Although the show was critically panned, Cuccioli's performance was praised. In 2019, he played the title role in Caesar and Cleopatra in off-Broadway's Theatre Row Building in a production by The Gingold Theatrical Group. For the same company in the same venue, he starred as Sir George Crofts in Mrs. Warren's Profession in 2021. He next starred as Cornelius "Con" Melody in A Touch of the Poet in Irish Repertory Theatre's 2022 off-Broadway production. David Finkle, writing for New York Stage Review, called Cuccioli's performance "grand ... another addition to a resumé attesting to Cuccioli’s place as a foremost tragedian".

In 2023, he played Judge Turpin in The Muny's production of Sweeney Todd: The Demon Barber of Fleet Street.

=== Television and film ===
Cuccioili's television appearances include Sliders (1999) and Baywatch (1997). He played Chief Franklin on The Guiding Light. He also appeared on All My Children and One Life to Live. He has appeared in several films, including in Woody Allen's Celebrity (1998), Operation Delta Force 3: Clear Target (1999), Heroic Times and The Stranger.

=== Directing ===
Cuccioli directed The Glass Menagerie in 2003 at The Shakespeare Theater of New Jersey. He has also directed productions of Jekyll & Hyde at Houston's Theatre Under the Stars, Pittsburgh Civic Light Opera and The Westchester Broadway Theatre.

=== Personal life ===
Cuccioli has been in a relationship with actress Laila Robins since 2000.

He released his first solo album, The Look of Love, a collection of standards from the 1930s and 1940s, in 2012.

== Theatre credits ==
Show	Role(s)	Year(s)	Production
The Pirates of Penzance	The Pirate King	1984	Off-Broadway
Senor Discretion Himself	Unknown	1985	Workshop
The Pirates of Penzance	Chorus	1986	US Tour
Camelot	Sir Lancelot du Lac	1986–1987	US and Canadian Tour
Jesus Christ Superstar	Pontius Pilate	1988	Millburn, New Jersey
Ankles Aweigh	Unknown	1988	Chester, Connecticut
1776	Edward Rutledge	1988	Millburn, New Jersey
The Rothschilds	Nathan	1990–1991	Off-Broadway
And the World Goes Round	Performer	1991–1992	Off-Broadway
Oklahoma!	Jud Fry	1992	Milburn, New Jersey
Phantom	The Phantom	1992–1993	Elmsford, New York
Les Misérables	Inspector Javert	1993–1995	Broadway
Jekyll & Hyde	Dr. Henry Jekyll / Edward Hyde	1995–1996	1st US Tour
Jekyll & Hyde	Dr. Henry Jekyll / Edward Hyde	1997–1999	Broadway
The Secret Garden	Lord Archibald Craven	1999	Sacramento, California
Enter the Guardsman	The Actor	2000	Off-Broadway
Sons of Don Juan	PiRoman	2000	San Jose, California
Victor/Victoria	King Marchan	2000	Milburn, New Jersey
The Threepenny Opera	Macheath	2000	Off-Broadway
Jekyll & Hyde	Director	2001	Elmsford, New York
Funny Girl	Nick Arnstein	2001	Milburn, New Jersey
Antony and Cleopatra	Mark Antony	2002	Madison, New Jersey
Jekyll & Hyde	Director	2002	Pittsburgh, Pennsylvania
Temporary Help	Karl Streber	2002	Off-Broadway
Funny Girl	Nick Arnstein	2003	Pittsburgh, Pennsylvania
The Sound of Music	Captain Georg von Trapp	2003	Milburn, New Jersey
The Glass Menagerie	Director	2003	Madison, New Jersey
Guys and Dolls	Sky Masterson	2004	Milburn, New Jersey
Macbeth	Macbeth	2004	Madison, New Jersey
Jekyll & Hyde	Director	2004	Houston, Texas
Julius Caesar	Brutus	2005	Madison, New Jersey
Lorenzaccio	Alexander di Medici	2005	Washington, D.C.
The Sound of Music	Captain Georg Von Trapp	2005	Pittsburgh, Pennsylvania
On the Twentieth Century	Dr. Johnson	2005	Broadway
Mirette	Bellini'	2005	Off-Broadway
Jacques Brel is Alive and Well and Living in Paris	Performer	2006	Off-Broadway
Jesus Christ Superstar	Pontius Pilate	2007	Montvale, New Jersey
Hamlet	Claudius	2007	Washington, D.C.
Lone Star Love	Frank Ford	2007	Seattle, Washington
Man of La Mancha	Miguel de Cervantes / Don Quixote	2007	White Plains, New York
Phantom	The Phantom	2007–2008	Elmsford, New York
Camelot	King Arthur	2008	White Plains, New York
The Seafarer	Mr. Lockhart	2008	New Brunswick, New Jersey
Amadeus	Antonio Salieri	2008	Milburn, New Jersey
A Moon to Dance By	Angelo	2009	Off-Broadway
1776	John Dickinson	2009	Milburn, New Jersey
42nd Street	Julian Marsh	2009	St. Louis, Missouri; The Muny
Les Misérables	Inspector Javert	2009	Pittsburgh, Pennsylvania
Jekyll & Hyde	Director	2010	Elmsford, New York
Dietrich & Chevalier: The Musical	Maurice Chevalier	2010	Off-Broadway
Jacques Brel Returns	Performer	2010	Off-Broadway
SCKBSTD	Norm	2011	Norfolk, Virginia (World Premiere)
Cutman: A Boxing Musical	Eli Hofman	2011	Chester, Connecticut (Workshop)
Jekyll & Hyde	Director	2011	Pittsburgh, Pennsylvania
The Sound of Music	Captain Georg Von Trapp	2011	Pittsburgh, Pennsylvania
Jesus Christ Superstar	Pontius Pilate	2011	Pittsburgh, Pennsylvania
1776	John Dickinson	2012	Ford's Theatre
Chess	Anatoly Sergievsky	2012	Lincoln Center
Spider-Man: Turn off the Dark	Norman Osborn / The Green Goblin	2012–2014	Broadway
Death Note: The Musical	Soichiro Yagami	2014	New York, New York (Workshop)
Elf the Musical	Walter Hobbs	2014-15	Millburn, New Jersey
Snow Orchid	Rocco	2015	Off-Broadway
Zorba	Mavrodani	2015	Encores!
Rothschild & Sons	Mayer	2015	Off-Broadway
White Guy on the Bus	Ray	2017	Off-Broadway
A Man's World	Malcolm Gaskell	2017	Off-Broadway
The Merchant of Venice	Director	2017	Madison, New Jersey
South Pacific	Emile de Becque	2018	Oakbrook Terrace, Illinois
Jekyll & Hyde	Director	2018	Beverly, Massachusetts
Fun Home	Bruce Bechdel	2018	White Plains, New York
Michael Strogoff: Courier of the Tsar	Director	2018	Off-Broadway
The White Devil	Physician	2019	Off-Broadway
Caesar and Cleopatra	Caesar	2019	Off-Broadway
Mrs. Warren's Profession	Sir George Crofts	2021	Off-Broadway
A Touch of the Poet	Cornelius Melody	2022	Off-Broadway
Sweeney Todd: The Demon Barber of Fleet Street	Judge Turpin	2022	St. Louis, Missouri; The Muny
Mozart: Her Story	Performer	2023	Carnegie Hall
The Tempest	Prospero	2023	Center Valley, Pennsylvania
The Tempest	Performer	2024	Off-Broadway
Fiddler on the Roof	Tevye	2025	Cleveland, Ohio
The Baker's Wife	Claude	2025	Off-Broadway
