= Peter Johl =

American actor (1927–2005)

- Born: Peter Randolph Johl; August 16, 1926; Scarsdale, New York, U.S.
- Died: November 3, 2005 (aged 79); New York City, U.S.
- Occupations: Stage performer; actor; singer
- Years active: 1950s–2000s
- Style: Theatre; musical theatre

Peter Randolph Johl (August 16, 1927 – November 3, 2005) was an American actor and singer who enjoyed a long career on Broadway, in touring companies, and off-Broadway. His wide voice range enabled him to sing a broad variety of roles in opera, sacred music, as well as musicals. As an actor, he was equally comfortable performing in Shakespearian or modern roles.

== Early life ==
Johl was born in Scarsdale, New York, on August 16, 1927. His father, Max Gustav Johl, owned a small factory and a very large piece of land at Trails Corner, on the outskirts of Groton, Connecticut, where the family had relocated when Peter was very young. His mother, Janet (née Janet Lambert Pagter), was a housewife and collector of dolls. The couple had three children: Peter, John (b. 1930) and little Janet (b. 1940). Although Max Johl was of Jewish descent, the connection had become tenuous and the Johl family observed Christian rituals, while Janet Johl was a practising Christian Scientist. In the winter of 1940, Peter Johl played the lead role of Scrooge in his school's production of A Christmas Carol. In 1952, he was a pupil of Grace Leslie's studio in New York and performed at a concert given by her students in Amesbury, Massachusetts, during which he sang three pieces as a tenor: Henry Purcell's "The Cares of Lovers", Robert Jones' "Farewell Dear Love" and Leonard Gybson's "Light O' Love".

== Career ==
In 1961, he was a junior at East Carolina College, by which time he had accumulated extensive experience in summer stock and toured with the Grass Roots Opera Company of North Carolina. He was tenor soloist for the presentation of The Messiah on many occasions in New Jersey, New York and North Carolina.

As a stage actor, Johl defined himself as a character actor, and his most famous role was in Jekyll & Hyde (1997–2001) as Poole, Jekyll's manservant, and he played two other minor roles in the production. He appeared in many plays and musicals, including: Baker Street: A Musical Adventure of Sherlock Holmes (1965), Pousse-Café (1966), and She Loves Me (1993–1994).

He was elected to The Lambs in 1991.

== Death ==
Johl died in New York City on November 3, 2005. His tombstone indicates that he served in the US Marines during World War II and the Korean War.

== Selected works ==
=== Stage ===
- A Christmas Carol (1940), as Scrooge
- The Hired Hand (1959), as the farmer
- Carmen (1960)
- Kismet (1960), as the bandit Jawan
- The seven words of Jesus Christ on the Cross (1961), as guest soloist
- My Fair Lady (1964), as Alfred P. Doolittle
- Baker Street: A Musical Adventure of Sherlock Holmes (1965), as a singer
- Pousse-Café (1966), as Professor George Ritter (standby)
- Fiddler on the Roof (1969), as Tevye (replacement)
- Rainbow Jones (1974), as Uncle Ithaca
- The Daydreams of a Young Lady (1978)
- Sly Fox (1979), as Captain Jethro Crouch
- Men in White (1979), as Dr Hochberg
- City Sugar (1979), as newscaster
- Frankovich (1982)
- Henry IV, Part 1 (1982), as Ralph Neville, Earl of Westmorland
- The Price (1985), as Gregory Solomon
- The Sweetshoppe Myriam (1986)
- The Comedy of Errors (1988), as Egeon
- She Loves Me (1993–1994), as Mr. Maraczek (replacement)
- The Last Leaf (1994), as Behrman
- Jekyll & Hyde (1997–2001), as Poole/Doctor/Lord G & u/s Sir Danvers (replacement)

=== Book narrator ===
- Ambush at Soda Creek (1977), by Lewis B. Patten
