= Jekyll & Hyde (musical) =

Musical

- The Musical
- Music: Frank Wildhorn
- Lyrics: Leslie Bricusse; Frank Wildhorn; Steve Cuden
- Book: Leslie Bricusse
- Basis: The Strange Case of Dr Jekyll and Mr Hyde by Robert Louis Stevenson
- Premiere: May 1990: Alley Theatre
- Productions: 1990 Houston; 1995 Houston; 1995 Seattle; 1995 US tour 1997 Broadway; 1999 US tour 2000 US tour 2004 UK tour 2011 UK tour 2012 US tour 2013 Broadway; 2014 US tour

Jekyll & Hyde is a 1990 musical based on the 1886 novella The Strange Case of Dr Jekyll and Mr Hyde by Robert Louis Stevenson. Originally conceived for the stage by Frank Wildhorn and Steve Cuden, it features music by Frank Wildhorn, a book by Leslie Bricusse and lyrics by all of them. After a world premiere run in Houston, Texas, the musical embarked on a national tour of the United States prior to its Broadway debut in 1997.

Many awarded international productions in various languages (more than 20 countries) have since been staged including two subsequent North American tours, two tours in the United Kingdom, a concert version, a revamped US tour in 2012, a 2013 Broadway revival featuring Constantine Maroulis, and an Australian concert version in 2019 starring Anthony Warlow.

== Development ==
Frank Wildhorn and Steve Cuden had written the score in the late 1980s, producing a demo recording in 1986 with Chuck Wagner, Christopher Carothers, Tuesday Knight and Gillian Gallant but it was not produced on Broadway due to financing. However, a concept recording was made featuring Colm Wilkinson as Dr. Henry Jekyll/Edward Hyde and Linda Eder as Lucy Harris and Lisa Carew. The show was subsequently re-written by Wildhorn and Leslie Bricusse and a world premiere production was announced for 1990 in Houston, Texas.

== Production history ==
=== Pre-Broadway engagements / tour ===
Jekyll & Hyde was first presented at the Alley Theatre in Houston, Texas, in May 1990 where it broke box office records, played to sold-out houses, and won acclaim from critics leading to the run being extended twice, finally closing in July 1990. Chuck Wagner played the title roles, with Rebecca Spencer as Emma Carew (then named Lisa) and Linda Eder as Lucy. Gregory Boyd directed the production. In 1992, there was a workshop starring Terrence Mann in the title roles.

After an almost three-year hiatus, the show returned to Houston, this time produced by Theatre Under the Stars. It ran from January 20, 1995, to February 19 for a limited engagement. It then played the 5th Avenue Theatre in Seattle from February 28 to March 19, 1995. Due to the success of both runs, the musical embarked on a national tour of the United States from August 1, 1995 (beginning in Dallas, Texas) through April 1, 1996 (ending in Baltimore, Maryland) The cast included Robert Cuccioli (Dr. Jekyll/Mr. Hyde), Linda Eder (Lucy Harris), Christiane Noll (Lisa Carew), Philip Hoffman (John Utterson), Rob Evan (Standby Jekyll/Hyde), and Dave Clemmons (Bishop of Basingstoke).

=== Original Broadway production ===
The musical premiered on Broadway at the Plymouth Theatre (now known as the Gerald Schoenfeld Theatre) on March 21, 1997 (previews), officially on April 28. Co-produced by Jerry Frankel and Jeffrey Richards, and directed by Robin Phillips, the original cast featured Robert Cuccioli as Jekyll and Hyde, Linda Eder as Lucy Harris, and Christiane Noll as Emma Carew, with Rob Evan originally cast as Cuccioli's alternate, performing the title roles at two performances per week (at matinees). The cast also featured George Robert Merritt as John Utterson, Barrie Ingham as Sir Danvers Carew and Martin Van Treuren as Spider, all of whom played their respective roles throughout the entire run. Raymond Jaramillo McLeod was originally cast as Simon Stride. He was later replaced by Merwin Foard, who in turn, was replaced by Robert Jensen. Coleen Sexton was a swing in the company before becoming the final Lucy Harris. Evan took over the title roles from Cuccioli on January 5, 1999 and Joseph Mahowald became the alternate Jekyll/Hyde. Jack Wagner took over the lead roles from Evan starting on January 25, 2000 and left the cast on June 11, 2000. Sebastian Bach played the lead from June 15, 2000 to October 15, 2000. Baywatch actor David Hasselhoff took over the lead on October 17, 2000 with Evan becoming the alternate again. The musical played an almost-four-year run and became the longest-running show in the history of the Plymouth Theatre, closing after 1,543 regular performances on January 7, 2001. The closing cast starred Hasselhoff, Evan, Sexton, Andrea Rivette as Emma, Merritt, and Ingham.

==== DVD recording ====
The Broadway production was filmed live at the Plymouth Theatre in 2000 with the final cast consisting of David Hasselhoff as Jekyll/Hyde, Coleen Sexton as Lucy and Andrea Rivette as Emma. This is the only official video recording of the musical that exists; it was released in Region 1 DVD in 2001. There was also a performance that was professionally recorded as a rehearsal for the DVD version with Rob Evan in the title role and is currently available on YouTube.

=== Later touring productions ===
The second national tour of the United States began previews on April 13, 1999, in Wallingford, Connecticut, before opening April 21 in Detroit, Michigan. The touring company was led by Chuck Wagner in the lead roles, with Sharon Brown as Lucy and Andrea Rivette as Emma. The final performance took place on April 30, 2000, in Houston, Texas, where the show debuted 10 years earlier.

The third US tour to run was a Non-Equity production featuring a Non-Equity cast. It ran from September 19, 2000 (in Evansville, Indiana), through May 20, 2001 (closing in New London, Connecticut). It starred Guy LeMonnier as Jekyll and Hyde, Annie Berthiaume as Lucy and Shani Lynn Nielsen as Emma.

The musical made its UK debut, when a national tour launched in Eastbourne on August 24, 2004. The tour, which featured Paul Nicholas as Jekyll/Hyde, alongside Louise Dearman as Lucy and Shona Lindsay as Lisa, ran through May 21, 2005, and closed in Sunderland. A second 6-month tour, mainly of the UK and Ireland began on January 20, 2011, in Bromley and ran through July 30 in Leeds, with Marti Pellow as Jekyll/Hyde, Sarah Earnshaw as Emma and Sabrina Carter as Lucy, under the direction of Martin Connors. The tour also played a month in Abu Dhabi.

A re-vamped North American touring production, featuring a more contemporary rock score, officially began performances in San Diego, California, on October 2, 2012, following previews from September 7 in La Mirada, California. Constantine Maroulis played the lead roles and was joined by Deborah Cox as Lucy and Teal Wicks as Emma. The tour, which had various changes to the orchestrations and arrangements of the original score, closed March 31 in Los Angeles in preparation for a pre-planned transfer to Broadway.

From 2016 to 2017, there was a world tour starring Diana DeGarmo as Lucy with Kyle Dean Massey and Bradley Dean alternating in the title roles.

=== Broadway revival ===
The revival opened on Broadway at the Marquis Theatre on April 5, 2013 (previews), officially on April 18. Originally scheduled to play a limited engagement through June 30, 2013, the production announced shortly after opening that it was to close early, on May 12. It closed that day following 29 regular performances and 15 previews, an unusual occurrence for a Broadway show. Maroulis, Cox, and Wicks reprised their respective roles as Dr. Jekyll/Mr. Hyde, Lucy, and Emma.

=== Jekyll & Hyde: In Concert ===
The musical was adapted into a concert version which toured North America and South Korea with Rob Evan playing Jekyll/Hyde. He was joined in the US by Brandi Burkhardt as Emma and Kate Shindle as Lucy and by Julie Reiber as Emma and Mandy Gonzalez as Lucy in Korea. The musical played two try-out engagements in June and September 2004 in Marlton, New Jersey, and Uncasville, Connecticut, respectively, before touring the US from September 10, 2005, in Birmingham, Alabama, until February 25, 2006, in Atlanta, Georgia. The Korean leg began in Seoul on April 7, 2006, and ended on May 3, 2006, in Pucheon-si. The production did, however, play two additional runs, one in Blacksburg, Virginia, on November 30, 2006, and a second engagement in Seoul from May 5–6, 2007.

=== Foreign and regional productions ===
Jekyll & Hyde has been staged in numerous countries around the world, including the Netherlands, Germany, Sweden, Spain, Hungary, Austria, Canada, Japan, Finland, Greece, Switzerland, Denmark, Mexico, the Czech Republic, New Zealand, Russia, Italy, Malta, the Philippines, South Korea, Taiwan, Brazil, Poland, Slovakia, Argentina, Israel, Ireland, China, and Turkey, and has been translated into multiple languages.

Following the closure on Broadway, performance rights became available in the US and UK, leading to many regional productions each year. Most notable was a staging directed by original star Robert Cuccioli in Elmsford, New York, which ran in 2001 and 2010.

An intimate version ran at London's Union Theatre from May 16 to June 16, 2012. Directed by Luke Fredericks, the production reimagined the story in a contemporary London setting. The cast featured Tim Rogers as Jekyll/Hyde, Madalena Alberto as Lucy Harris and Joanna Strand as Emma Carew.

The first professional production in Australia was a concert version in 2019. It marked the 25th anniversary of The Complete Work recording and starred Anthony Warlow as Jekyll/Hyde, Jemma Rix as Lucy and Amanda Lea LaVergne as Emma. The concert was presented at the Arts Centre Melbourne in October 2019, with the Melbourne Symphony Orchestra, and at the International Convention Centre Sydney in November 2019, with the Sydney International Orchestra.

In July and August 2022, the Hayes Theatre Company produced the first staged Australian version, directed by Hayden Tee and reimagined in the post-World War II era. The production featured a chamber orchestration by Nigel Ubrihien, with actress Madeleine Jones as Utterson.

== Film adaptation ==
On January 21, 2013, it was announced that Mike Medavoy, Rick Nicita and his production company RPMedia had secured the rights for a feature film version of the musical to be made. According to reports from The New York Times, Wildhorn and Bricusse will play a major role in the casting of the film. In addition to finding a director, the producers had hoped to release the film by 2015. In March 2019, it was announced that Alexander Dinelaris will write the script and produce the movie through his Lexicon banner with Richard Saperstein's Bluestone Entertainment after Medavoy and Nicita's attempt fell through. On May 19, 2019, Dinelaris announced that the script was completed and that he and the producers began to negotiate with studios to produce it. They hoped to have had filming begin in the Fall of 2020, but no report was made since then, even with the impact of the COVID-19 pandemic on the film industry.

== Synopsis ==
The majority of the show's story has not changed from production to production, but many of the songs have been altered, cut or replaced since the show debuted.

=== Act I ===
The audience is introduced to John Utterson and Sir Danvers Carew, both having been associated with Doctor Henry Jekyll. Utterson was Jekyll's lawyer and best friend while Sir Danvers was Jekyll's future father-in-law. The two gentlemen take the audience back some time to find Jekyll in an insane asylum singing of his comatose father ("Lost in the Darkness"). It is Jekyll's belief that the evil in his father's soul has caused his illness. Jekyll tells the audience about his passion to find out why man is both good and evil and his attempts to separate the good from the evil ("I Need to Know").

Some time later, the rich and poor of 19th century London describe how people act – how they want others to see them, no matter who they really are inside ("Façade"). Afterward, Jekyll presents a research proposal to the Board of Governors of St. Jude's Hospital. Sir Danvers, the chairman of the board, is in attendance along with His Grace Rupert the 14th Bishop of Basingstoke, the Right Honorable Sir Archibald "Archie" Proops, Lord Theodore "Teddy" Savage, Lady Elizabeth "Bessie" Beaconsfield, General Lord Glossop and Simon Stride, the secretary. All, with the exception of Sir Danvers, already deem the proposal an inconvenience. When Jekyll proposes to test his theory and his formula on a human subject (presumably his father), they scorn the proposal with cries of "sacrilege, lunacy, blasphemy, heresy", voting five to none with Sir Danvers' one abstention ("Board of Governors"). Utterson tries to calm Jekyll down, knowing that he is obsessed over his father's condition. Jekyll feels that he could "save" those who have fallen in the same darkness. Utterson urges his friend, if he feels he is right about his theory, that he should continue ("Pursue the Truth").

Later that night, a group of high society Londoners turns up at Sir Danvers' residence at Regent's Park, which has a well-maintained façade. Sir Danvers throws a showy party for his daughter Emma, for her engagement to Dr. Jekyll, to which Jekyll is late. ("Façade" (reprise 1). During the party, the guests – which include the Governors and Stride, deride Danvers and Emma for her engagement to a "madman", but Utterson, Sir Danvers and Emma back up Jekyll. Stride, who has feelings for Emma, speaks to Emma in private and tries to reason her out of her engagement, but she quickly turns him down, saying she feels she can be who she wants to be with Jekyll ("Emma's Reasons").

Jekyll arrives late as usual – just before the party leaves to go see the fireworks – and shares a moment with Emma. Though he warns her he may always be busy with his work, Emma swears she will be beside him through it all ("I Must Go On/Take Me as I Am"). Sir Danvers returns as Jekyll leaves and expresses to Emma that he considers Jekyll like a son to him but finds it difficult to tolerate his behavior at the cost of losing his daughter. Emma assures him that he will never lose her, and they should not be afraid to let go ("Letting Go").

Jekyll and Utterson later go to the dregs of Camden Town known as "The Red Rat" for Jekyll's bachelor party ("Façade (reprise 2)"). Prostitute Lucy Harris arrives late and is in for some trouble with the boss, known as 'Spider', but she dismisses it for now. Despite her position in life, she is seen to be kind-hearted and well-liked by her co-workers but has moments of contemplation about her life ("No One Knows Who I Am").

Guinevere, the German manager of "The Red Rat", then breaks Lucy's reverie and then sends her out onstage to do her number ("Bring on the Men" or "Good 'N' Evil" depending on the production), which captivates Jekyll. After the number, Lucy begins to circulate among the clientele. Spider approaches Lucy and after striking her hard across the face, threatens to kill her if she is late again. Jekyll approaches Lucy after witnessing the Spider's actions and intends to help her as Utterson is led away by another bar girl. Jekyll and Lucy are drawn to each other in a way that promises each of them a great friendship. Jekyll admits Lucy's song has helped him find the answer to his experiment. Utterson reemerges, and Jekyll tells Lucy that he must be on his way. Before he goes, he gives Lucy his visiting card and asks her to see him should she ever need a friend ("Lucy meets Jekyll").

As Utterson and Jekyll arrive at the latter's residence, Utterson notices that Jekyll is in a better mood. Jekyll informs him that he has found a subject for his experiments. Utterson recommends that Jekyll go straight to bed and departs. Jekyll dismisses his butler, Poole, for the night and proceeds to his laboratory, excited that the moment has come to conduct his experiment ("This Is the Moment"). Keeping tabs on the experiment in his journal, Jekyll mixes his chemicals to create his formula, HJ7, and injects it into the subject: himself (in some versions, he drinks the formula, as he did in the book). After a minute of the potion's side effects, he writhes in pain, and is taken over by an alternate, aggressive personality ("First Transformation"). With grim humor he notes in his journal "4:00 AM -A few slight changes" (the exact line varies, depending on the production). He gleefully goes out and roams the streets, taking in the sights and sounds of London while tormenting innocent bystanders, which includes a sexually abusive encounter with Lucy (“Lucy meets Hyde”). Jekyll's alternate personality gives himself a name: Edward Hyde ("Alive").

A week later, no one has heard anything from Jekyll. Emma, Sir Danvers and Utterson ask Poole where he is, but Emma decides to leave and believes Jekyll will come for her after his work is finished. After Emma and Sir Danvers leave, Poole tells Utterson that Jekyll has been locked in his lab all this time and that he has heard strange sounds from the lab. Jekyll, who seems distraught, emerges and impatiently sends Poole to fetch some chemicals for him. Utterson confronts Jekyll about his bizarre behavior, but Jekyll brushes this off. He instead gives Utterson three letters: one for Emma, another for her father, and one for Utterson himself should Jekyll become ill or disappear. Suspicious and concerned, Utterson warns Jekyll to not let his work take over his life. Meanwhile, Emma and Sir Danvers argue about the prudence of Emma's marriage to a man who seems to be falling into an ever-deepening abyss. Emma again tells her father that she understands that Jekyll's work is important ("His Work and Nothing More").

After Utterson departs, Lucy arrives at Jekyll's residence with an aggressive bruise on her back. As Jekyll treats her wound, she tells him a man named Hyde inflicted it. Jekyll is stunned by this revelation but hides it. Feeling compassion for Jekyll for being kind to her, Lucy kisses him ("Sympathy, Tenderness"). Disturbed by his own actions, Jekyll leaves Lucy, who wonders about her love for him ("Someone Like You").

Later, the Bishop of Basingstoke is seen with Guinevere after having a "meeting" with one of her underage attendants. He pays Guinevere and arranges to see the attendant next Wednesday. When Guinevere and the attendant leave, Hyde appears holding a swordstick with a heavy pewter knob. After insulting the Bishop, Hyde proceeds to beat and stab him to death with the swordstick before gleefully setting the body aflame ("Alive (reprise)").

=== Act II ===
Utterson and Sir Danvers speak to the audience once again of past events with Jekyll: Utterson begins to feel he was not able to help his poor client and friend, while Danvers senses that something was horribly wrong with his work, as he had not been seen or heard from for weeks.

The citizens of London gossip about the bishop's murder as Hyde hunts down and kills General Glossop, Sir Proops, Lady Beaconsfield, and Lord Savage. By now, all five Governors who rejected Jekyll's proposal are dead ("Murder, Murder"). Later one night, Emma lets herself into Jekyll's laboratory. She finds his journal open and reads one of his entries. Jekyll enters and immediately closes the journal, preventing her from learning what he has become. Emma can see he is distraught. She professes her love for him and begs him to confide in her ("Once Upon a Dream"). He tells her nothing of his work, but says he still loves her. After Emma leaves, Jekyll writes in his journal that Hyde has taken a heavy toll on him and those around him, and that the transformations are occurring of their own accord. His entry is interrupted when Utterson arrives at the lab, seeking to find out who Jekyll's sole heir is, Edward Hyde, as referred to in Jekyll's letter. Jekyll only tells him that Hyde is a "colleague" involved in the experiment. Utterson can see that his friend is desperately ill and agrees to obtain the rest of the chemicals Jekyll requires. Jekyll, once again alone, begins to face the fact that Hyde is a part of him ("Obsession"). At the same time, both Lucy and Emma wonder about their love for the same man ("In His Eyes").

At "The Red Rat", Nellie and Lucy consider their profession and why they keep doing it ("The Girls of the Night"). Lucy is then visited by Hyde, who tells her that he is going away for a while. He then warns her to never leave him. Lucy is terrified, but seems to be held under a sexual, animalistic control by Hyde ("Dangerous Game"). As they leave together, Spider addresses the "Red Rat" attendants, warning them to always be aware of what dangers lie ahead in the East End ("Façade (reprise 3)").

Utterson comes to Jekyll's lab with the rest of the chemicals and a secret envelope and discovers Hyde, who informs him that the doctor is "not available" tonight. Utterson refuses to leave the package with anyone but his friend and demands to know where he is. Hyde replies that even if he told him, Utterson would not believe him. Utterson insists on seeing Jekyll, threatening to alert the police otherwise. Hyde angrily attempts to attack Utterson who threatens him with his swordstick. Trapped, Hyde injects the formula into himself, roaring with laughter as he reverts to Jekyll in front of an appalled Utterson. Jekyll tells Utterson that Hyde must be destroyed, whatever the cost. He then begs Utterson to deliver money for Lucy so she can escape to safety. As Utterson leaves, Jekyll mixes in chemicals and injects the new formula, fearing that he might lose himself forever, and praying that he can restore his former life ("No One Must Ever Know").

Utterson visits Lucy at "The Red Rat" with the money, along with a letter from Jekyll that entreats her to leave town and start a new life elsewhere. After Utterson leaves, Lucy wonders of the possibilities ahead ("A New Life"). Just then, Hyde returns. Seeing the letter from Jekyll, he tells Lucy that he and the doctor are "very close" and that they "share everything". In some versions Hyde reveals that he feels that Lucy has betrayed him by being in love with Jekyll and by going to see him every day. He then calls Lucy over to him and holds her very close. As he holds Lucy softly so that she does not suspect it, he slowly, angrily and savagely stabs her multiple times before slitting her throat ("Sympathy, Tenderness (reprise)"). The vile murderer runs off laughing, just as the "Red Rat" attendants find Lucy's body and carry her out on a stretcher. Covered in Lucy's blood, Jekyll returns to his laboratory and faces off with Hyde in a final battle for control ("Confrontation").

Later, Utterson tells the audience that Jekyll had given up his task of "finding the truth", condemning his father to the darkness. Yet, as Sir Danvers would put it, the doctor had returned at "the sound of wedding bells" ("Façade (reprise 4)"). Several weeks later, Jekyll seems to have regained control as he and Emma stand before the priest at their wedding in St. Anne's Church. As the Minister begins the ceremony, Jekyll doubles over in pain and transforms into Hyde. Hyde then kills Simon Stride, a guest at the wedding, before taking Emma hostage. At the sound of Emma's pleading voice, Jekyll is able to regain momentary control. He begs Utterson to kill him, but Utterson cannot bring himself to harm his friend. Desperate, Jekyll impales himself on Utterson's swordstick. Emma weeps softly as Jekyll dies, finally free of Hyde's evil control ("Finale").

=== Notes ===
(*) "I Need to Know" was removed for the 1997 Broadway production but featured in all other productions (in some cases it replaces "Lost in the Darkness").
(**) "Bring On the Men" was replaced by "Good 'N' Evil" for the Broadway production only; it was re-instated in all subsequent productions.
(***) For the Broadway production only, "Streak of Madness" was shortened and re-titled "Obsession"; it was re-instated in full for all subsequent productions.

Further note: In subsequent productions following Broadway, reprises 1, 2 and 4 of "Façade" are usually removed (henceforth what was "Façade (reprise 3)" on Broadway, effectively becomes the sole "Façade (reprise)"). Also, in certain productions, songs featured on the 1994 complete work recording have been re-instated, i.e. "The World Has Gone Insane" and "The Girls of The Night" on the concert tour, and several foreign productions.

== Musical numbers ==
All songs feature music and lyrics by Frank Wildhorn and Leslie Bricusse. Steve Cuden is the co-lyricist for the songs "First Transformation," "Alive," "His Work and Nothing More," "Alive (reprise)," "Murder, Murder," and "Once Upon a Dream".

=== 1994 Complete Work Recording ===
Act I

- "Prologue" – Jekyll
- "I Need to Know" – Jekyll
- "Façade" – Townspeople
- "Bitch, Bitch, Bitch" – Partygoers
- "The Engagement Party" – Jekyll, Stride, Utterson, Sir Danvers
- "Possessed" – Jekyll, Lisa
- "Take Me As I Am" – Jekyll, Lisa
- "Lisa Carew" – Stride, Lisa
- "Board of Governors" – The Board, Jekyll
- "Bring On the Men" – Lucy
- "Lucy Meets Jekyll" – Jekyll, Lucy
- "How Can I Continue On?" – Jekyll, Utterson
- "This Is the Moment" – Jekyll
- "Transformation" – Jekyll
- "Lucy Meets Hyde" – Hyde, Lucy
- "Alive" – Hyde
- "Streak of Madness" – Jekyll
- "His Work and Nothing More" – Jekyll, Utterson, Sir Danvers, Lisa
- "Sympathy, Tenderness" – Lucy
- "Someone Like You" – Lucy

Act II

- "Mass" – Choir
- "Murder, Murder!" – Citizens
- "Letting Go" – Sir Danvers, Lisa
- "Reflections" – Jekyll
- "In His Eyes" – Lucy, Emma
- "The World Has Gone Insane" – Jekyll
- "The Girls of the Night" – Lucy, Whores
- "No One Knows Who I Am" – Lucy
- "It's a Dangerous Game" – Hyde, Lucy
- "Once Upon a Dream – Lisa" – Lisa
- "No One Must Ever Know" – Jekyll
- "A New Life" – Lucy
- "Once Upon a Dream – Jekyll" – Jekyll
- "Confrontation" – Jekyll, Hyde
- "The Wedding Reception" – Lisa, Sir Danvers, Hyde, Jekyll

=== 1997 Original Broadway Production ===
Act I

- "Prologue"
- "Lost in the Darkness" – Jekyll
- "Façade" – Townsfolk, Utterson, Simon Stride
- "Jekyll's Plea" – Jekyll, The Bishop of Basingstoke, Sir Archibald Proops, Simon Stride, Sir Danvers, Lady Beaconsfield, General Lord Glossop, Lord Savage
- "Pursue the Truth" – Jekyll, Utterson
- "Façade (reprise 1)" – Townsfolk
- "Emma's Reasons" – Simon Stride, Emma
- "I Must Go On" – Jekyll, Emma
- "Take Me As I Am" – Emma, Jekyll
- "Letting Go" – Sir Danvers, Emma
- "Façade (reprise 2)" – Townsfolk
- "No One Knows Who I Am" – Lucy
- "Good 'N' Evil" – Lucy, Prostitutes
- "Here's to the Night (Lucy Meets Jekyll)" – Lucy, Jekyll
- "Now There Is No Choice" – Jekyll
- "This Is the Moment" – Jekyll
- "First Transformation" – Jekyll and Hyde
- "Alive" – Hyde
- "Your Work and Nothing More" – Utterson, Jekyll, Emma, Sir Danvers
- "Sympathy, Tenderness" – Lucy, Jekyll
- "Someone Like You" – Lucy
- "Alive (reprise)" – Hyde, The Bishop of Basingstoke

Act II

- "Murder, Murder" – Townsfolk, General Lord Glossop, Hyde, Simon Stride, Jekyll, Sir Archibald Proops, Lady Beaconsfield, Lord Savage, Sir Danvers, Emma
- "Once Upon a Dream" – Emma
- "Obsession" – Jekyll
- "In His Eyes" – Emma, Lucy
- "Dangerous Game" – Lucy, Hyde
- "Façade (reprise 3)" – The Spider, Townsfolk
- "The Way Back" – Jekyll
- "A New Life" – Lucy
- "Sympathy, Tenderness (reprise)" – Hyde, Lucy
- "Lost in the Darkness (reprise)" – Jekyll
- "Confrontation" – Hyde and Jekyll
- "Façade (reprise 4)" – Townsfolk
- "Finale" – Emma

Changes made after the original Broadway production

- "I Need to Know", sung by Jekyll, was re-instated to the score (placed after "Lost in the Darkness"; in some productions, it is in its place)
- Reprises 1, 2 and 4 of "Façade" are generally removed; in effect "Façade (reprise 3)" becomes "Façade (reprise)"
- "Bring On the Men" re-instated in place of "Good 'N' Evil"
- "Streak of Madness" re-instated in full, and re-titled from "Obsession"
- "Bitch, Bitch, Bitch!", sung by the ensemble, is re-instated in some, but not all, productions (placed after "Façade")
- "The Girls of the Night", sung by Lucy and the whores, is re-instated in some, but not all, productions (placed after "In His Eyes")

The Concert

- The song list for the concert tour is almost identical to that of the 1994 complete work recording, but cutting out the large ensemble numbers and vocals. It omits most of the changes made for the Broadway production and features an exclusively new song, "If You Only Knew" (sung by Emma), which has thus far, only featured in very few productions.

== Characters ==
- Dr. Henry Jekyll / Mr. Edward Hyde vocal range: baritone/tenor
- Emma Carew (Originally Lisa Carew) – Jekyll's fiancée. vocal range: soprano
- Lucy Harris – The main attraction at "The Red Rat". vocal range: mezzo-soprano
- Gabriel John Utterson – Jekyll's lawyer and friend. vocal range: baritone/tenor
- Sir Danvers Carew – Emma's father and Chairman of the Board of Governors. vocal range: baritone
- Simon Stride – The secretary of the Board of Governors and Jekyll's rival for Emma's affections. In pre-Broadway tours he was the proprietor of "The Red Rat." vocal range: baritone
- Lord Savage – A member of the Board of Governors. vocal range: tenor
- Bishop of Basingstoke – A hypocritical, sadistic, horny man of the cloth and a member of the Board of Governors. vocal range: baritone/tenor
- Lady Beaconsfield – The only female member of the Board of Governors. vocal range: mezzo-soprano
- Sir Archibald Proops – A member of the Board of Governors. vocal range: baritone
- General Lord Glossop – A pompous retired army man and a member of the Board of Governors. vocal range: baritone/Bass
- Spider – A pimp and proprietor of "The Red Rat". Pre-Broadway, his role was merged with Simon Stride's. vocal range: baritone
- Nellie – An attendant of "The Red Rat". Pre-Broadway, her role was merged with Guinevere's. vocal range: mezzo-soprano
- Guinevere – The German manager of "The Red Rat"
- Poole – Jekyll's loyal manservant.

== Casts ==
Characters	Houston	Houston	Seattle	US tour	Broadway	US tour	UK tour	UK tour	US tour	Broadway
Characters	1990	1995	1995	1995	1997	1999	2004	2011	2012	2013
Henry Jekyll Edward Hyde	Chuck Wagner	Robert Cuccioli	Robert Cuccioli	Robert Cuccioli	Robert Cuccioli	Chuck Wagner	Paul Nicholas	Marti Pellow	Constantine Maroulis	Constantine Maroulis
Lucy Harris	Linda Eder	Linda Eder	Linda Eder	Linda Eder	Linda Eder	Sharon Brown	Louise Dearman	Sabrina Carter	Deborah Cox	Deborah Cox
Emma Carew	Rebecca Spencer (as Lisa Carew)	Christiane Noll (as Lisa Carew)	Christiane Noll (as Lisa Carew)	Christiane Noll (as Lisa Carew)	Christiane Noll	Andrea Rivette	Shona Lindsay (as Lisa Carew)	Sarah Earnshaw	Teal Wicks	Teal Wicks
John Utterson	Philip Hoffman	Philip Hoffman	Philip Hoffman	Philip Hoffman	George Merritt	James Clow	Charles Shirvell	Mark McGee	Laird Mackintosh	Laird Mackintosh
Sir Danvers Carew	Edmund Lyndeck	Rod Loomis	Rod Loomis	Martin Van Treuren	Barrie Ingham	Dennis Kelly	Richard Colson	David Delve	Richard White	Richard White
Simon Stride	Bill Nolte	Bill Nolte	Bill Nolte	Raymond McLeod	Raymond McLeod	Christopher Yates	Robert Irons	Michael Taibi	Jason Wooten	Jason Wooten
Nellie	Nita Moore	Nita Moore	Nita Moore	Nita Moore	Emily Zacharias (as Guinevere)	Felicia Finley	Jennifer Hepburn	Amira Matthews	Dana Costello	Dana Costello

=== Notable replacements ===
Broadway (1997–2001)

- Henry Jekyll/Edward Hyde: Rob Evan, Joseph Mahowald, Jack Wagner, Sebastian Bach, David Hasselhoff
- Lucy Harris: Luba Mason, Coleen Sexton, Brandi Chavonne Massey (u/s), Katherine Shindle (u/s)
- Emma Carew: Anastasia Barzee, Andrea Rivette, Kelli O'Hara (u/s), Rebecca Spencer (u/s)
- John Utterson: John Treacy Egan (u/s)
- Sir Danvers Carew: Peter Johl (u/s)

== Reception ==
The Broadway run ran for over 1,500 performances, from April 28, 1997 to January 7, 2001. This long run was despite generally lukewarm to poor reviews and ultimately the show lost money – more than $1.5 million – upon closure.

== Recordings ==
=== English-language recordings ===
1986 demo album
Made in 1986, this was the oldest version of the play, and features Chuck Wagner as Jekyll and Hyde, Tuesday Knight as Lucy Harris, and Gillian Gallant as Lisa Carew, as well as lyrics from Steve Cuden. The demo only contains ten songs, making it the shortest line up of any Jekyll & Hyde recording, and of all the songs, "Alive", "Murder, Murder", and "Letting Go" are the only ones to go on every recording of the musical, though containing different lyrics and musical arrangements in its original form. Songs like "The Engagement Party", "The First Time", "Find My Way Again", "If He/She Only Knew", "Waiting There Tonight", and "'Til Forever" were only exclusive to this album, with later versions reworking them or removing them all together. "The Ballad of Dr Jekyll and Mr Hyde" would later reappear again on the 1987 Demo Album along with several reprises, before being replaced by "Façade" in later productions. Hard copies of the album are unavailable for purchase because it was made for noncommercial use and the only way to listen to it is through website leaks.

1987 demo album
Demo version of the musical made in 1987 for producers. This version is very different from the complete work. "Façade" is not as prominent as in the later version. A song "The Ballad of Dr Jekyll & Mr Hyde" has four reprises (in similar fashion to Sweeney Todd). Other songs that are only included in this version are "Seven Solid Years", "Jekyll's Disbelief", "Possessed", "I Must Go On", "It's Over Now" (which was later reworked to become "Confrontation") and "We Still Have Time". The Songs "Façade", "Alive", "Murder, Murder", "His Work and Nothing More" and "Someone Like You" are very different from later versions. The sound quality of this recording is poor as the CD was not made to be sold.

Concept album
Recorded in 1990, the CD features Colm Wilkinson as Jekyll/Hyde and Linda Eder as both Lucy and Emma (the latter then named Lisa). The album contained the original versions of many songs that would later be reworked and included in altered forms in subsequent recordings. Many songs, however, weren't included in this album. Those included all of the songs containing Hyde vocals, with the debatable exception of "Transformation" (Although that song seemed to have been altered so only Jekyll would be singing) the ensemble numbers, and the more story driven songs, which leaves the only remaining songs to be sung by Jekyll, Lucy, and Lisa. It is also the only recording that has the song "Love Has Come of Age" which, despite being the intended centerpiece for the musical, never made it past the 1990 Alley Theatre production.

The Complete Work
Released in 1994, prior to the first national tour, the recording has the sub-title The Gothic Musical Thriller: The Complete Work. The album features Australian and world-renowned musical theatre star Anthony Warlow as Jekyll/Hyde, Linda Eder as Lucy, Carolee Carmello as Lisa, and John Raitt as Sir Danvers. This version features more songs than any other recording and represented the incarnation of the show before its major re-write for Broadway including the condensing of the character Simon Stride, who had a much more prominent role at this stage. Anthony Warlow performed the role of Jekyll & Hyde live on stage for the first time since The Complete Work recording in Melbourne (October 2019) and in Sydney (November 2019) in a special 25th Anniversary Concert Production with the Melbourne Symphony Orchestra and the Sydney International Orchestra. Jemma Rix performed the role of Lucy.

Original Broadway cast recording
This 1997 recording features Robert Cuccioli as Jekyll/Hyde, Linda Eder as Lucy, Barrie Ingham as Sir Danvers and Christiane Noll as Emma (now re-named from Lisa.) As the definitive Broadway recording, this CD features the final arrangements of the songs of the musical (sometimes for length and complexity) and features all musical numbers except "Jekyll's Plea," "Here's to the Night" and "Sympathy, Tenderness (reprise)" which were not recorded for reasons unknown. Reviewers have generally preferred the mix of female voices in this version of the musical, with the contrast between Emma and Lucy made more marked, as opposed to the soprano-on-soprano duets of the earlier recordings. This recording is currently available to stream in full on popular music and audiobook streaming service Spotify, for free on Desktop, or with a paid subscription on a mobile device.

Resurrection recording
This 2006 recording featured Rob Evan as Jekyll/Hyde, Kate Shindle as Lucy and Brandi Burkhardt as Emma and is a studio recording of the arrangements that would go on to form Jekyll & Hyde: In Concert. It features several songs, all re-worked to include psychedelic/rock guitar accompaniment, mainly during Hyde's songs. The songs featured on this CD are built upon those from the "Complete Work" recording, and include very few of the alterations made for the original Broadway cast recording.

The new 2012 concept recording
Prior to the 2012–13 re-vamped US Tour, which led to a limited Broadway engagement following conclusion, a new recording was made featuring 18 of the musical's re-worked songs to be featured in the new production starring Constantine Maroulis as Jekyll/Hyde, Deborah Cox as Lucy, Teal Wicks as Emma, Corey Brunish as Utterson, and Tom Hewitt as Sir Danvers, with Carly Robyn Green, and Shannon Magrane. There was a contest for a fan submission piece to be included with the album's booklet, to be selected by Frank Wildhorn, Cox and Maroulis through Broadwayworld. The album was released on September 25, 2012 in conjunction with the tour's opening.

Australian promotional recording
Starring Simon Burke as Jekyll/Hyde, Delia Hannah as Lucy and Terri Crouch as Emma, this CD was recorded to promote the then-upcoming Australian production, which never materialized, leading to all un-sold copies of the recording being recalled. This remains the rarest of all the recordings.

=== Foreign-language recordings ===
- Antwerp, Belgium (1997) – 4 track promotional extended play featuring Hans Peter Janssens as Jekyll/Hyde, Ann Lauwereins as Emma and Hilde Norga as Lucy.
- Bremen, Germany (1999) – featuring Ethan Freeman as Jekyll/Hyde, Lyn Liechty as Lucy, and Susanne Dengler as Lisa.

Charts

Chart	Peak position
German Albums (Offizielle Top 100)	92

- Madrid, Spain (2001) – featuring Raphael as Jekyll/Hyde, Marta Ribera as Lucy, and Margarita Marbán as Emma.
- Budapest, Hungary (2001) – featuring László Molnár as Jekyll/Hyde, Kata Janza as Lucy, and Bernadett Tunyogi as Emma.
- Vienna, Austria (2002) – featuring Thomas Borchert as Jekyll/Hyde, Eva Maria Marold as Lucy and Maya Hakvoort as Lisa.
- Tokyo, Japan (2003) – featuring Takeshi Kaga as Jekyll/Hyde, Marcia as Lucy, and Rina Chinen as Emma.
- Staatz, Austria (2005) – featuring Werner Auer as Jekyll, and Hyde, Brigitte Treipl as Lucy and Elizabeth Sikora as Lisa.
- Seoul, South Korea (2004) – featuring Cho Seung-woo & Ryu Jung-han as Jekyll/Hyde, Choi Jung-won as Lucy, and Kim So-hyun as Emma.
- Prague, Czech Republic (2006) – Daniel Hůlka sings the part of Jekyll/Hyde, Tereza Duchková sings Lucy, and Kateřina Brožová sings Emma. There are also tracks with Marián Vojtko singing Jekyll/Hyde, and Michaela Nosková singing Lucy.
- Seoul, South Korea (2006) – Double CD featuring Cho Seung-woo as Jekyll/Hyde, Lee Young-mi & Kim Sun-young as Lucy, and Lee Hye-kyeoung as Emma.
- Stockholm, Sweden (2008) – featuring Mikael Samuelson as Jekyll, Sarah Dawn Finer as Lucy, and Myrra Malmberg as Emma.
- Chorzów, Poland (2011) – featuring Janusz Kruciński as Jekyll/Hyde.
- Shanghai, China (2017) – featuring Liu Lingfei/ Zheng Yunlong as Jekyll/Hyde, Li-Tong Hsu as Lucy, and Wang Ziting/ Zhang Huifang as Emma.
- Spanish tour (2019) – featuring Abel Fernando as Jekyll/Hyde, Silvia Villaú as Lucy, and Thäis Marin as Emma.
- Seoul, South Korea (2021) – Triple CD (each featuring a different cast) featuring Hong Kwang-ho, Shin Sung-rok and Ryu Jung-han respectively as Jekyll/Hyde.

== Awards and nominations ==
=== Original Broadway production ===
Year	Award ceremony	Category	Nominee	Result
1997	Tony Award	Best Book of a Musical	Leslie Bricusse	Nominated
1997	Tony Award	Best Actor in a Musical	Robert Cuccioli	Nominated
1997	Tony Award	Best Costume Design	Ann Curtis	Nominated
1997	Tony Award	Best Lighting Design	Beverly Emmons	Nominated
1997	Theatre World Award		Linda Eder	Won
1997	Drama Desk Award	Outstanding Actor in a Musical	Robert Cuccioli	Won
1997	Drama Desk Award	Outstanding Actress in a Musical	Linda Eder	Nominated
1997	Drama Desk Award	Outstanding Set Design of a Musical	Robin Phillips, James Noone, Christina Poddubiuk	Won
1997	Outer Critics Circle Award	Outstanding New Broadway Musical		Nominated
1997	Outer Critics Circle Award	Outstanding Actor in a Musical	Robert Cuccioli	Won
1997	Outer Critics Circle Award	Outstanding Actress in a Musical	Linda Eder	Nominated
1997	Outer Critics Circle Award	Outstanding Director of a Musical	Robin Phillips	Nominated
1997	Outer Critics Circle Award	Outstanding Choreographer	Joey Pizzi	Nominated
1997	Outer Critics Circle Award	Outstanding Lighting Design	Beverly Emmons	Nominated
