= Chuck Wagner =

American actor (born 1958)

- Born: June 20, 1958 (age 68); Nashville Tennessee, U.S.
- Education: University of Alabama; University of Southern California
- Occupations: Actor; singer; director; musical theater historian; teacher
- Years active: 1981–present
- Known for: Into the Woods; Beauty and the Beast; Jekyll & Hyde; Automan
- Spouse: Susan Wagner
- Children: 2

Chuck Wagner (born June 20, 1958) is an American actor, director, musical theater historian and teacher. He has had an extensive career in theater, but is perhaps best known for co-starring in the short-lived science fiction TV series Automan (1983–84).

His notable Broadway credits include both Princes and The Wolf in Into the Woods, Inspector Javert in Les Misérables, and The Beast and Gaston in Beauty and the Beast. He also originated the title roles in the world premiere of Jekyll & Hyde and reprised the roles on the 2nd US national tour.

== Early life ==
Wagner was born in Nashville, Tennessee, and raised in Hartsville, Tennessee. He attended public school in Gallatin. While at Gallatin High School, he performed the leads in "My Fair Lady", "Carousel", and "Inherit the Wind". As a BFA student, he attended the University of Alabama in Tuscaloosa under Edmond Williams and the University of Southern California in Los Angeles under John Houseman. His collegiate summers were spent in Manteo, North Carolina, where he played John Borden in The Lost Colony, America's second-longest-running historical outdoor drama.

== Career ==
=== Television ===
He is known for his role in the short-lived science fiction 1983 TV series Automan as the title character. He also starred on the soap opera General Hospital as Randall Thompson in 1981 and 1982.

In 1981, Wagner was a contestant on the television game show Password Plus.

In 1984, he appeared on the Match Game-Hollywood Squares Hour.

In 2012, he was also a contestant on Who Wants to Be a Millionaire.

Wagner has made guest appearances on numerous TV shows, including The Dukes of Hazzard, Dynasty, and Matlock.

=== Musical theatre ===
Wagner has performed in several Broadway productions. His first role on Broadway was in The Three Musketeers in 1984 as Athos.

Wagner went on to originate the role of Rapunzel's Prince in the original Broadway cast of Stephen Sondheim's Into the Woods (1987). The recording of that show, on which Wagner appears, won the Grammy Award for Best Musical Show Album. In 1988, he joined the cast of the first US tour of Into the Woods playing the roles of The Wolf and Cinderella's Prince. (Roles he understudied in the original Broadway production)

Wagner has appeared on Broadway (replacement) and in the U.S. national tour (1992) of Les Misérables as Inspector Javert. In 1994, he began a four-year stint as "The Beast", in Disney's Beauty and the Beast, in both the Broadway (replacement) and Toronto productions. Wagner originated the title roles in Frank Wildhorn's Jekyll & Hyde in 1990 and Svengali in 1991 at The Alley Theatre in Houston, Texas. He reprised his dual roles in Jekyll & Hyde in the post Broadway national tour in 1999. In 2001 he toured the U.S. in Cole Porter's Kiss Me, Kate as the MacArthuresque General Harrison Howell and understudy to Rex Smith's Fred Graham. He appeared on Broadway in 2004, in Wildhorn's Dracula, The Musical, standing by for Dracula, Van Helsing and Quincey Morris.

Wagner also sang the role of Sir Percival Blakeney, aka The Scarlet Pimpernel, in the original concept recording of The Scarlet Pimpernel (1992).

In 1997, Wagner along with the original Broadway cast of Into the Woods reunited for a tenth anniversary concert at the Broadway Theatre in New York City. Wagner reprised his roles of the Wolf and Cinderella’s Prince in the place of Robert Westenberg. (Broadway understudy Jonathan Dokuchitz played Rapunzel’s Prince in Wagner’s place.)

In 1999, he released a self-titled solo CD, on which he sang songs from the various musicals in which he has appeared. He also recorded demo songs for a cancelled Star Wars musical, in which he played Han Solo.

He played The Captain of the S.S. American in Kathleen Marshall's production of the Cole Porter musical Anything Goes in a year long tour that began in October 2012. In November 2013 he starred as Jean Valjean in Les Misérables as Equity Guest Artist at Lipscomb University in Nashville, Tennessee.

In February 2014, he reprised his role as Javert in Les Misérables for the North Carolina Theatre in Raleigh. He was accompanied by his former broadway co-star, Craig Schulman, who reprised his role as Valjean. The show was directed by Dave Clemmons, who played Valjean opposite Wagner during the U.S. National Tour. In May 2014 he played Javert in Les Misérables for Studio Tenn with the Nashville Symphony at the Schermerhorn Symphony Center. In June 2014 he appeared as Jean Valjean in Les Misérables at the Lyric Theatre in Oklahoma City in a production featuring a 100 voice chorus.

== Other work ==
He has appeared in commercials for Zyban, and toured as the Ringmaster in both the 136th edition of the Ringling Brothers and Barnum & Bailey Circus, Circus of Dreams (2006 through 2007), and the 138th edition Over The Top (2008 to 2009).

In 2010, while at home in Pensacola Beach, Florida, he joined the response to the BP oil spill helping to coordinate a large scale mechanical beach operation while safeguarding the local sea turtles.

An avid musical theatre historian, Wagner served as Visiting Artist in Residence at the University of West Florida in Pensacola. He performs concerts and teaches in high schools and colleges. Between theatrical jobs he is a member of the touring concert series, Neil Berg's 100 Years of Broadway.

== Notable theatre roles ==
Show	Role(s)	Year(s)	Production
1776	Colonel Thomas McKean	1976	Prestonburg, Kentucky
The Lost Colony	John Borden	1977-1978	Manteo, North Carolina
Christopher	Christopher	1979	University of Southern California
The Three Musketeers	Athos	1984	Broadway
Camelot	Lancelot du Lac	1986	Sacramento
Oklahoma!	Curly McLain	1986	San Diego
Jekyll & Hyde	Dr. Henry Jekyll / Mr. Edward Hyde	1986	Demo Album
Into the Woods	Rapunzel's Prince	1986-1987	San Diego (World Premiere)
Into the Woods	Rapunzel's Prince u/s The Wolf / Cinderella's Prince	1987-1988	Broadway
Into the Woods	The Wolf / Cinderella's Prince	1988-1989	US Tour
Into the Woods	Rapunzel's Prince	1989	Broadway (Limited 3-night run)
Camelot	Lancelot du Lac	1990	Houston
Camelot	Lancelot du Lac	1990	Sacramento
Jekyll & Hyde	Dr. Henry Jekyll / Mr. Edward Hyde	1990	Houston (World Premiere)
Svengali	Svengali	1991	Houston (World Premiere)
Kiss Me, Kate	Fred Graham / Petruchio	1991	Stockbridge, Massachusetts
Svengali	Svengali	1991	Sarasota, Florida
The Scarlet Pimpernel	Percy Blakeney / The Scarlet Pimpernel	1992	Concept Album
Les Misérables	Inspector Javert	1992-1993	3rd US Tour
Les Misérables	Inspector Javert	1993	Broadway
Beauty and the Beast	u/s Gaston s/b The Beast	1994-1995	Broadway
Beauty and the Beast	The Beast	1995-1996	Toronto
The Scarlet Pimpernel	Percy Blakeney / The Scarlet Pimpernel	1996	Demo Recording
Beauty and the Beast	The Beast	1997-1998	Broadway
Into the Woods	The Wolf / Cinderella's Prince	1997	10th Anniversary Concert Broadway
Jekyll & Hyde	Dr. Henry Jekyll / Mr. Edward Hyde	1999-2000	2nd US Tour
A Little Night Music	Count Carl-Magnus Malcolm	2001	Beverly, Massachusetts
1776	Edward Rutledge	2001	Fort Worth, Texas
Kiss Me, Kate	MacArthuresque General Harrison Howell u/s Fred Graham / Petruchio	2001-2002	US Tour
Jekyll & Hyde	Director	2002	University of West Florida
Mame	Beauregard Jackson Pickett Burnside	2003	Beverly, Massachusetts
Man of La Mancha	Director	2003	University of West Florida
A Little Night Music	Count Carl-Magnus Malcolm	2004	Chicago
Dracula: The Musical	s/b Count Dracula s/b Van Helsing s/b Quincey Morris	2004-2005	Broadway
Annie Get Your Gun	Frank Butler	2005	Okaloosa Walton Community College
Anyone Can Whistle	J. Bowden Hapgood	2005	Philadelphia, Pennsylvania
Hello Dolly	Horace Vandergelder	2010	Nashville, Tennessee
Anything Goes	The Captain of the SS American u/s Elisha J. Whitney	2012-2013	US Tour
Les Misérables	Jean Valjean	2013	Nashville, Tennessee
Les Misérables	Inspector Javert	2014	Raleigh, North Carolina
Les Misérables	Inspector Javert	2014	Nashville, Tennessee
Les Misérables	Jean Valjean	2014	Oklahoma City, Oklahoma
Seaplane: The Musical	Alexander Graham Bell	2015	Pensacola, Florida
Julius Caesar	Julius Caesar	2019	Nashville, Tennessee

== Discography ==
Title	Role(s)(If Applicable)	Year	Type
Jekyll and Hyde	Dr. Henry Jekyll Mr. Edward Hyde	1986	Demo Recordings
Jekyll and Hyde	Dr. Henry Jekyll Mr. Edward Hyde	1987	Non-Commercial Concept Album
Into the Woods	Rapunzel's Prince	1987	Original Broadway Cast Album
The Scarlet Pimpernel	Percy Blakeney/The Scarlet Pimpernel	1992	Concept Album
The Civil War	One of the "Broadway All-Stars"	1996	Concept Album
The Scarlet Pimpernel	Percy Blakeney/The Scarlet Pimpernel	1996	Pre-Broadway Demo Recordings
Chuck Wagner	N/A	1999	Solo Album
Star Wars: The Musical	Han Solo	1999	Demo Recordings(Unproduced)
Dracula	Van Helsing	2000	Demo Album
Dillinger: Public Enemy Number One	Melvin Purvis	2000	Demo Recordings(Unproduced)

== Filmography ==
Show:	Role:	Year(s):	Film/TV/Other:
Password Plus	Himself	1981	TV
Dukes of Hazard	Joey Bryan	1981	TV
General Hospital	Randall Thompson	1981-1982	TV
Soap World	Himself	1982	TV
Automan	Automan	1983	TV
Tattletales	Himself	1983	TV
Matchgame	Himself	1984	TV
America 3000	Korvis	1986	Film
The Sisterhood	Mikal	1988	Film
American Performances: Into the Woods	Rapunzel's Prince	1991	TV
Terminal Virus	Mikal	1995	Film(Uncredited Archive Footage)
Calling Automan: The Auto Feature	Himself	2012	DVD Extra
Hewlogram	Original Hewlogram	2017	Short Film
