= Coleen Sexton =

American stage actress (born 1979)

- Born: Westfield, New Jersey, U.S.
- Occupation: Actress

Coleen Sexton (born in Westfield, New Jersey) is an American stage actress who made her Broadway debut at age 20 in Frank Wildhorn and Leslie Bricusse's Jekyll & Hyde in 2000. She portrayed the starring role of Lucy Harris in the Broadway production as an understudy from 1999, and took over the role from Luba Mason in January 2000. She can be seen on the DVD of the show starring Andrea Rivette as Emma Carew and David Hasselhoff in the title role. Before making her debut in Jekyll & Hyde, Sexton was a singer/performer in a Germany-based band called 5NY.

== Theatre career ==
Sexton is mostly known for her portrayal of Lucy Harris in the Broadway production of Jekyll & Hyde, where she was the final actress to play the role. Sexton has also toured with the Broadway National touring company of Chicago, from 2004 until 2005.

In 2007, Sexton was the standby for Elphaba on the first North American tour of Wicked. She joined the tour January 3 through October 28, 2007, playing the role in the absence of lead star Victoria Matlock. Her first performance took place in Providence on January 17, when she replaced Matlock mid-show.

Sexton also played Brooke Wyndham in the national tour of Legally Blonde, and the Lady of the Lake in Spamalot at the Gateway Playhouse through July 30, 2011.

In 2012 Sexton returned to the New York stage in the Off-Broadway musical Forever Dusty, about British singer Dusty Springfield. She plays dual roles of "Becky Brixton", Dusty Springfield's manager, and later "Gini", a drug and alcohol counselor. Sexton also understudies the lead role of Dusty Springfield. She played the Springfield role for the first time on February 4, 2013.

In 2018, Sexton joined the touring company of Dear Evan Hansen as a standby for Heidi Hansen and understudy for Cynthia Murphy, alongside fellow Jekyll & Hyde alum Christiane Noll. As of 2022, Sexton is the principal actor for the role of Heidi Hansen.

Raised in Westfield, New Jersey, Sexton went into acting after graduating from Westfield High School.
