= List of Your Lie in April episodes =

- Cover of the first Blu-ray volume released by Aniplex in Japan on February 25, 2015, featuring (from left to right) Ryōta Watari, Kōsei Arima, and Tsubaki Sawabe
- No. of episodes: 22 + OVA

Release
- Original network: Fuji TV (Noitamina)
- Original release: October 10, 2014 – March 20, 2015

Your Lie in April is an anime television series adapted from the manga series of the same name by Naoshi Arakawa. The story follows a piano prodigy named Kōsei Arima, who had become famous as a child musician after dominating many competitions. However, after his mother died, he could no longer play the piano. Two years later, Kōsei meets a girl named Kaori Miyazono, a free-spirited violinist who helps Kōsei return to the world of music by showing him that music should be played freely and without restrictions, unlike Kōsei, who had played his music in a structured manner.

The anime was directed by Kyōhei Ishiguro at A-1 Pictures and written by Takao Yoshioka, featuring character designs and animation direction by Yukiko Aikei and music composed by Masaru Yokoyama. The series aired from October 10, 2014, to March 20, 2015, on Fuji TV's Noitamina block. Aniplex released the series in Japan on Blu-ray and DVD from February 25, 2015. The series is licensed by Aniplex of America within North America, who simulcasted the series on Aniplex Channel, Crunchyroll, Hulu and Viewster. Madman Entertainment licensed the series in Australia and New Zealand, who made the series available on AnimeLab. Anime Limited licensed the series in the United Kingdom and Ireland.

The series uses four pieces of theme music: two opening themes and two ending themes. For the first eleven episodes and the original video animation, the opening theme is "Hikaru Nara" by Goose house, while the ending theme is "Kirameki" (キラメキ; lit. "Sparkle") by wacci. From episode twelve onwards, the opening theme is "Nanairo Symphony" (七色シンフォニー; lit. "Seven-Colored Symphony") by Coalamode, while the ending theme is "Orange" (オレンジ, Orenji) by 7!! (Seven Oops).

== Episodes ==
No.	Title	Directed by	Written by	Storyboarded by	Original release date	Refs.
1	"Monotone/Colorful"; Transliteration: "Monotōn/Karafuru" (Japanese: モノトーン / カラフル)	Kyōhei Ishiguro	Takao Yoshioka	Kyōhei Ishiguro	October 10, 2014	
Former piano prodigy Kōsei Arima, softball player Tsubaki Sawabe and soccer player Ryōta Watari are childhood friends who attend the same junior high school. Tsubaki believes the world to be colorful when one is in love, while Kōsei views the world as monotone ever since the death of his mother Saki Arima two years ago. Tsubaki invites Kōsei on a double date, as Ryōta will be introduced to a girl who has a crush on him. Kōsei explains that he used to be a pianist to fulfill Saki's dream up until her death, yet he still clings to the piano because that is all he has left. The next day, Kōsei is the first to arrive at the park. He sees a girl playing a melodica, and three children join her in harmonious playing to attract pigeons. After making a bad first impression involving an accidental upskirt, he realizes that she is actually Ryōta's date when Tsubaki and Ryōta arrive. The girl is revealed to be a violinist named Kaori Miyazono, who is getting ready to perform in a concert hall. A flashback shows that Kōsei performed the Third Movement of Beethoven's Moonlight Sonata, but he froze in the middle of the performance due to being overwhelmed by Saki's death.
2	"Friend A"; Transliteration: "Yūjin Ē" (Japanese: 友人A)	Takahiro Harada	Takao Yoshioka	Kyōhei Ishiguro	October 17, 2014	
Kōsei, Kaori, Tsubaki and Ryōta make it to the concert hall, where the second annual junior high division violin competition is being held, ten minutes before it begins. When Kōsei, Tsubaki and Ryōta enter the auditorium, Kōsei breathes in the nostalgic scent, and some people recognize him as a former piano prodigy. As the first round of the preliminaries starts, each contestant plays the same set piece with a piano accompanist. Kaori is the fourth contestant to come onto the stage and play the set piece, but she plays it in a unique manner, wowing the audience. After the competition, Kōsei observes from the sidelines as Kaori runs towards Ryōta, almost like a scene from a romance movie. Because of this, Kōsei feels like he is playing the role of "Friend A", pondering his newfound mixed emotions for Kaori. The next day, since Ryōta has soccer practice after school, Kaori offers Kōsei to stand in for Ryōta in the meantime. During the first round of the violin competition, Kaori performs the First Movement of Beethoven's Kreutzer Sonata, but she played it in a totally different style compared to the original score.
3	"Inside Spring"; Transliteration: "Haru no Naka" (Japanese: 春の中)	Kazuya Iwata	Takao Yoshioka	Mamoru Kanbe	October 24, 2014	
When Kōsei and Kaori go to the café, they notice an upright piano, in which Kaori orders Kōsei to play "Twinkle, Twinkle Little Star". The sound soon resonates around the café as he begins to play a variation of the melody, but he abruptly stops and leaves in the middle of his performance. Kaori finds Kōsei at a park, where he reveals that he begins to lose his ability to hear the sound of the piano once he starts to concentrate, as if the flower petals are pulled upward and caught in the spring wind. Since Kaori was nominated by the audience to advance to the second round of the preliminaries, she tells him to get over his so-called curse and embrace his talent, appointing him as her new piano accompanist. Kōsei later tries to evade Tsubaki and Kaori, who post the chosen set piece all over school and home. Kaori eventually finds Kōsei on the school roof, and he continues to refuse her request. She reaches out to him after persistent begging, and he finally agrees. At the café, Kōsei performs the melody of Mozart's theme and first variation form of "Twinkle, Twinkle Little Star", in which one girl accompanies him while another girl listens in amazement.
4	"The Journey"; Transliteration: "Tabidachi" (Japanese: 旅立ち)	Ayako Kawano; Kazuya Iwata; Kyōhei Ishiguro	Takao Yoshioka	Mamoru Kanbe	October 31, 2014	
Kōsei, Kaori, Tsubaki and Ryōta rush to the concert hall on bikes, making it on time before the second round of the preliminaries begins. In the hallway of the venue, Kaori headbutts Kōsei to calm down his nerves and tells him not to worry, all before they are called up on stage and begin their musical journey together. Although they start off the set piece slowly and quietly, the tempo increases and the playing style intensifies. Kōsei begins to feel trapped at the bottom of an ocean, unable to hear the sound of the piano. His accompaniment eventually spins out of control, and he suddenly stops playing, stirring confusion from the audience. Kaori continues playing for a while, but she stops as well and says to him to do it again. She resumes playing the set piece, and he gains the confidence to start accompanying again, as he draws out his fears. As they finish performing, they get a standing ovation from the audience, but Kaori faints on the stage soon after. During the second round of the violin competition, Kōsei and Kaori perform Saint-Saëns's Introduction and Rondo Capriccioso, a piece that starts calmly and then becomes vigorous in tempo and dynamics.
5	"Cloudy Skies"; Transliteration: "Donten Moyō" (Japanese: どんてんもよう)	Masashi Ishihama; Takashi Kojima	Takao Yoshioka	Masashi Ishihama	November 7, 2014	
Kōsei, Tsubaki and Ryōta visit Kaori in her hospital room. Kōsei feels responsible for disqualifying Kaori from advancing to the final round of the preliminaries due to stopping in the middle of their performance, yet she has not said a word of reproach to him. He feels out of place since this is not something he can easily forget. Tsubaki has not been herself either, shown when she is not focused during softball practice, as if her eyes are cloudy. She seeks advice from her good friend Nao Kashiwagi. Tsubaki later encounters Saitō, the former captain of the softball team of whom she used to admire. When Kaori is discharged from the hospital and comes back to school, Kōsei hesitates to speak to her until Ryōta approaches by her side. After school, Kōsei finds Kaori playing hopscotch at a bridge, where she implores him to enter a piano competition. Kaori dives into the river below, which motivates Kōsei to do the same.
6	"On the Way Home"; Transliteration: "Kaerimichi" (Japanese: 帰り道)	Yoshihide Ibata	Takao Yoshioka	Yoshihide Ibata	November 14, 2014	
Kaori reveals that she not only recorded Kōsei poorly practicing a set piece for the upcoming piano competition, but she also already submitted his entry of participation, much to his shock. However, she encourages him to imagine how he wants to play this piece. Tsubaki realizes how close Kōsei and Kaori are becoming and feels left out, so she contacts Saitō and asks him to be her boyfriend. After Kaori coaches Kōsei through the set piece, they witness Tsubaki playing in the softball regional tournament. While running around the bases, Tsubaki breaks focus and injures her foot before sliding into the home plate, costing her team the game. As Tsubaki suffers from this devastating incident, Kōsei gives her a piggyback ride on their way home. As the recording plays, Kōsei performed Chopin's "Wrong Note" Étude, characterized with having dissonant semitones in succession in the minor key main theme and consonant melodic lines in the parallel major key second theme. In the recording, Kōsei was pressing the piano keys too hard due to his inability to hear the piano, resulting in a very ugly performance.
7	"The Shadow Whispers"; Transliteration: "Kage Sasayaku" (Japanese: カゲささやく)	Takahiro Majima	Takao Yoshioka	Mamoru Kanbe	November 21, 2014	
During the soccer regional tournament, Ryōta misses the soccer goal on his last kick, also costing his team the game. With the day of the piano competition approaching, a troubled Kōsei collapses from exhaustion during physical education class and is carted to the infirmary. Kaori later walks with Kōsei to the park, where he says that he is trapped in Saki's shadow. However, Kaori believes that Kōsei is himself, giving him comfort and support. On the day of the piano competition, Kōsei enters the concert hall and walks past a boy and a girl awaiting his arrival. A flashback reveals that Takeshi Aiza and Emi Igawa were piano prodigies who were jealous of Kōsei since he always bested them in every piano competition during their childhood. As the piano competition begins, Kōsei sits in the hallway, scared out of his mind. As Takeshi is called up onto the stage, Kōsei recalls Kaori telling him to be confident in himself.
8	"Let it Ring"; Transliteration: "Hibike" (Japanese: 響け)	Hidetoshi Takahashi	Takao Yoshioka	Keiji Gotoh	November 28, 2014	
It is shown that Takeshi declined an invitation to an international piano competition because he believes that Kōsei will finally arise after an absence of two years. As Takeshi plays his set piece on stage, it is recalled that he worked tenaciously to improve his musical talent due to his aspiration to play like Kōsei. Takeshi receives a thunderous applause from the audience after he finishes his performance, and his hands shiver once he leaves the stage. After an intermission of fifteen minutes, Emi walks onto the stage to perform her set piece. Emi also vowed to become better at the piano after being in awe of Kōsei, but she lost her motivation to play when Kōsei vanished from the scene, unable to live up to her potential in her musical talent. Since Kōsei is finally back, she gives the performance of her life, expressing her emotions of anger and loneliness as she lets the music ring from within her. The audience gives a huge applause following her performance. During the piano competition, Takeshi performs Chopin's "Torrent" Étude, in which continuous sixteenth notes are played in perpetual motion. Emi performs Chopin's "Winter Wind" Étude, emphasizing two melodic lines to demonstrate right hand dexterity and left hand flexibility. Both of their performances reflect their idolization towards Kōsei.
9	"Resonance"; Transliteration: "Kyōmei" (Japanese: 共鳴)	Miyuki Kuroki	Takao Yoshioka	Mamoru Kanbe	December 5, 2014	
A flashback explains that Emi threw away all of her ambitions in order to learn how to play the piano, after hearing Kōsei perform for the first time. After a resonating performance, Emi heads backstage to the hallway and attempts to confront Kōsei, but she finds herself bereft of words and just walks away. After another intermission of fifteen minutes, Kōsei comes onto the stage to play his set piece. As Kōsei approaches the piano and plays the set piece, he confronts his past. He first wanted to win every piano competition, believing that would cure Saki from her terminal illness. However, he wished for her to die since he could no longer handle her strict manner and abusive attitude, later feeling regretful for what he said after she died. That feeling comes back to haunt him as he feels trapped in an ocean again, not being able to hear the notes anymore. During the piano competition, Kōsei performs Chopin's "Wrong Note" Étude again, and he starts out perfectly this time. However, he slowly begins to give in to the haunting memories of his mother, breaking focus from the set piece.
10	"The Scenery I Shared With You"; Transliteration: "Kimi to Ita Keshiki" (Japanese: 君といた景色)	Takahiro Harada	Takao Yoshioka	Shōko Nakamura	December 12, 2014	
Kōsei begins to fall apart in his performance, drawing buzz from the audience. He feels trapped in his mother's shadow, unable to escape from his trauma. He stops midway through, looking at Kaori in the audience and wondering why she played again during her performance before. This motivates him to keep playing, discreetly dedicating this set piece to Kaori. The music sounds differently this time, as if the stars are shining brightly in the night sky. He feels somehow connected to Kaori, sharing the same scenery of spring in a way, since it is because of her that gave him the ability to play again. When he finishes performing, the audience sit in silent awe before giving a scattered applause. During the piano competition, Kōsei performs Chopin's "Wrong Note" Étude once again, but after falling apart and stopping midway through, he resumes his performance by focusing his attention on Kaori.
11	"Light of Life"; Transliteration: "Inochi no Akari" (Japanese: 命の灯)	Kyōhei Ishiguro; Takahiro Kawakoshi	Takao Yoshioka	Kaito Asakura	December 19, 2014	
After the performance, Kōsei runs into Hiroko Seto, a world-renowned pianist and Saki's close friend, along with her cheerful daughter Koharu Seto. Hiroko is aware that Kōsei was emitting love during his performance, but Kōsei really was showing gratitude instead. The results of the piano competition are posted, and Kōsei expectedly did not move on. Both Takeshi and Emi are struck by how he has changed and matured, but they do not understand how he has felt for so long. The next day, Hiroko visits Kōsei, who fell asleep from playing the piano all night long. She had been selected to participate in a gala concert at the concert hall, and she invites Kōsei to accompany her again. Hiroko offers to be Kōsei's piano teacher, to which he accepts. At night, Kōsei and Kaori enter into a field of fireflies, and Kaori comments that the light of a firefly is also its own life. Kōsei admits that Kaori was his inspiration during his performance in the piano competition.
12	"Twinkle Little Star"; Transliteration: "Twinkuru Ritorusutā" (Japanese: トゥインクル リトルスター)	Toshinori Fukushima	Takao Yoshioka	Mamoru Kanbe	January 9, 2015	
Kōsei disagrees with the set piece that Kaori has chosen for the gala concert. Hiroko wants Kōsei to focus on being a pianist and to not focus so much on his dead mother. At night, Kōsei and Kaori sing "Twinkle, Twinkle, Little Star" before arriving at Kaori's house, where her parents work in a family-owned pastry shop. The next day, Kōsei and Kaori struggle to be in sync during their practice. To relax a bit, Kōsei, Kaori, Tsubaki, Ryōta, and Nao play with fireworks by the school swimming pool. Tsubaki accidentally pushes Kōsei in the swimming pool, where Kōsei recalls Hiroko telling him to hear the music from his heart and not from his ears. He wakes up to his friends, in which Ryōta saved him from drowning. On the day of the gala concert, Kōsei worries when Kaori has not arrived yet. During a few practice sessions, Kōsei and Kaori perform Love's Sorrow, the second of three short pieces from Kreisler's Old Viennese Melodies. Kaori tried her best to get Kōsei to play with feeling rather than with structure, which is possibly why she chose this particular piece.
13	"Love's Sorrow"; Transliteration: "Ai no Kanashimi" (Japanese: 愛の悲しみ)	Ayako Kurata	Takao Yoshioka	Ayako Kurata	January 16, 2015	
Since Kaori is a no-show, Kōsei takes the stage alone, much to the audience's surprise. Kōsei plays a piano transcription of the set piece, which was originally composed for violin and piano. Following Hiroko's advice, Kōsei plays with a gentle touch, hearing the notes through his heart and not through his ears. As he uses this opportunity to prove himself as a pianist, he internally comes to terms with memories of and connection to Saki. As Hiroko listens to the performance, she remembers Saki's worry for Kōsei's future — the reason she was pushing him so hard — and her own failure in being there for Kōsei after Saki's passing. Once Kōsei finishes, he hears a light applause, and the ghost of Saki no longer haunts him. He walks into the hallway and cries on Hiroko's shoulder, finally happy to let go of his sorrowful remorse. After seeing Kōsei with a smile on his face, Tsubaki begins to have tears, but she is torn between relief and regret. During the gala concert, Kōsei performs Rachmaninoff's piano transcription of Love's Sorrow from Kreisler's Old Viennese Melodies. This is a surprise because the gala concert was to honor the top performers from the violin competition.
14	"Footsteps"; Transliteration: "Ashiato" (Japanese: 足跡)	Tomotaka Shibayama	Takao Yoshioka	Tomotaka Shibayama	January 23, 2015	
Tsubaki tells Kōsei that Kaori was sent to the hospital again after collapsing in her home before the concert. Though Kaori acts cheerful in front of her friends, she hides from them the true extent of her condition. Nao notes that Tsubaki may have romantic feelings for Kōsei instead of Saitō, but Tsubaki denies it, claiming she only sees Kōsei as a brother. Kōsei visits Kaori again, explaining that he decided to play the set piece by himself instead of just going home, and he realizes that she chose the set piece because of him. Nao continues to worry about Tsubaki being with Saitō, while Kōsei ponders which high school to attend next year. Later on, Kōsei and Tsubaki walk barefoot on the beach, reliving past moments. However, Tsubaki runs away in tears when Kōsei reveals that he will be moving away to attend an early college high school of music.
15	"Liar"; Transliteration: "Usotsuki" (Japanese: うそつき)	Takeshi Yajima	Takao Yoshioka	Mamoru Kanbe	January 30, 2015	
Tsubaki cannot hide her feelings of confusion since Kōsei plans to move away. After Saitō breaks up with Tsubaki, she tells Kōsei as he plays the piano to comfort her. Tsubaki is frustrated as she sees her friends moving forward, afraid that she might be left behind. She believes Kōsei to be a liar when he said that he would stay by her side. Kōsei tries to visit Kaori but frequently makes excuses not to go through with it. On one such occasion, he encounters a girl, who falls on top of him from a tree, and he takes her to see Hiroko. The girl is Nagi Aiza, an aspiring pianist and Takeshi's younger sister who wants Hiroko to be her teacher. After watching her play, Hiroko agrees to take Nagi, but appoints Kōsei as her teacher instead. Eventually, Kaori calls Kōsei on the phone and tells him to bring some canelés for her the next day. As Kaori later walks weakly in the hospital hallway, she is unable to stand up after falling on the floor. In the music room, Kōsei performs the Third Movement of Debussy's Suite bergamasque, famously known as "Clair de lune", in order to comfort Tsubaki after her breakup with Saitō. At Hiroko's house, Nagi performs Chopin's "Wrong Note" Étude in order to convince Hiroko to take her in as a student, but this hints that Nagi may be after Kōsei as an ulterior motive.
16	"Two of a Kind"; Transliteration: "Nitamo no Dōshi" (Japanese: 似たもの同士)	Miyuki Kuroki	Takao Yoshioka	Miyuki Kuroki	February 6, 2015	
Kaori surprises Kōsei by dragging him to a shopping spree at a department store before bringing Kōsei to school with her after lying that she left her backpack behind. As Kōsei takes Kaori home on a bike, she tearfully thanks him for spending time with her. Meanwhile, Nagi does not get along with Kōsei, as Kōsei frequently points out all of Nagi's mistakes, and Nagi hates Kōsei for being her brother's center of attention. Eventually, Nagi runs away mid-lesson, and Kōsei finds her at a stairway to a shrine where she used to play with Takeshi. Nagi admits that she looks up to her older brother, whereas Kōsei reveals that he looks up to a girl that he can never date. Nagi begins to understand Kōsei through their shared desire to chase after the one person that they cannot catch up with. Kaori eventually learns about Kōsei's lessons and becomes upset that he is spending time away from her. She proposes a double suicide with Kōsei.
17	"Twilight"; Transliteration: "Towairaito" (Japanese: トワイライト)	Ayako Kawano	Takao Yoshioka	Mamoru Kanbe	February 13, 2015	
Nao worries about Tsubaki for her obvious feelings for Kōsei. Meanwhile, though Kaori assures Kōsei that she was not being serious, Kōsei is shaken by her proposal and the site of her at the hospital reminding him of his mother. After Hiroko notices Kōsei distracted and cuts his piano lesson early, Nagi follows him and tries to cheer him up. Kōsei tells Nagi to learn how to play for someone else, and she thinks of Takeshi, who had lost his competitive spirit after Kōsei's performance at the previous competition. Ryōta eventually convinces Kōsei to visit Kaori in the hospital, but Kōsei does not have much to say when he sees her, and she tells him to forget about her. Feeling lost on what he should do, he asks Nagi if he can perform with her at the upcoming school festival. She agrees, but experiences performance anxiety in the days leading up to the school festival. Remembering her mistake with Kōsei, Hiroko encourages her and gives her advice. The day before the festival, Kōsei asks Ryōta for a favor. On the day of the festival, Kōsei helps Nagi relax before they take the stage.
18	"Hearts Come Together"; Transliteration: "Kokoro Kasaneru" (Japanese: 心重ねる)	Toshimasa Ishii	Takao Yoshioka	Toshimasa Ishii	February 20, 2015	
Kōsei and Nagi perform a set piece written for piano four hands as Ryōta has Kaori listen to their performance over a phone call. During the performance, Kōsei competes with Nagi to see if she can keep up with him. As Nagi believes that she understands Kōsei on a deeper level, this pushes her to perform with all her heart. After they end their set piece, the audience is blown away with their performance. While backstage, Kōsei is confronted by Takeshi, his jealousy towards Kōsei teaming with his sister reinvigorating his competitive spirit. Takeshi demands Kōsei the chance to beat him in an upcoming piano competition. Kōsei visits Kaori on the roof of the hospital to find her passion for music has reawakened. Kōsei challenges Kaori to perform one more duet with him. During the school festival, Kōsei and Nagi perform Rachmaninoff's piano arrangement of the Waltz from Tchaikovsky's The Sleeping Beauty. This is unique because it is arranged for piano four hands, meaning two pianists play on a single piano.
19	"Goodbye, Hero"; Transliteration: "Sayonara Hīrō" (Japanese: さよならヒーロー)	Kosaya	Takao Yoshioka	Yoshihide Ibata	February 27, 2015	
Kaori opts for a risky surgery for the sake of having the chance to perform with Kōsei one more time and begins undergoing rehabilitation. Kaori's parents thank Kōsei for giving hope to their daughter. At the school library, Nao tells Tsubaki that Kōsei has been practicing nonstop for the upcoming piano competition. Nao compares the competition to their high school entrance exams and tells Tsubaki to let go of her jealousy towards music and cheer for Kōsei, lest he fails and goes to study abroad. As Tsubaki gives Kōsei a haircut, she contemplates letting go of her jealousy of Kaori as well. On the day of the piano competition, Kōsei shares an egg sandwich with Emi and Takeshi, bringing them on good terms with him. As Takeshi plays his set piece, he contemplates his rivalry with Kōsei and chooses to move on from it, allowing him to return to form. During the piano competition preliminaries, Takeshi performs Chopin's "Revolutionary" Étude, played with relentless sixteenth notes in the left hand and cross-rhythms in the right hand. Takeshi used this piece to express how Kōsei is his hero rather than his rival.
20	"Hand in Hand"; Transliteration: "Te to Te" (Japanese: 手と手)	Takeshi Yajima	Takao Yoshioka	Mamoru Kanbe	March 6, 2015	
Kōsei makes it past the preliminary round. In the new year, Ryōta drags Kōsei to the hospital to visit Kaori, who continues to exhort Kōsei to keep practicing. Tsubaki confronts Kōsei about him liking Kaori despite Kaori liking Ryōta, which he admits. Tsubaki confesses to Kōsei before kicking him in the shin and running off in tears. Tsubaki begins avoiding Kōsei, while Hiroko tries to tell Kōsei that he needs to concentrate on the piano competition finals. Kaori later contacts Kōsei to watch a late-night flight in the starry sky as a kitten follows him home. The following day, Kōsei admits to Ryōta that he likes Kaori, though Ryōta already figured as much. The two then witness witness nurses rushing into Kaori's room as she enters cardiac arrest. After leaving the hospital, Kōsei watches as the kitten gets hit by a car and rushes it to a veterinary to no avail. After washing his hands of the blood, he cries in agony.
21	"Snow"; Transliteration: "Yuki" (Japanese: 雪)	Ayako Kurata; Tomotaka Shibayama	Takao Yoshioka	Tomotaka Shibayama	March 13, 2015	
Upon learning of Kaori's condition and that Kōsei witnessed it, Tsubaki asks for Hiroko's help, fearing that he was going to regress to his state from 2 years ago. Hiroko finds Kōsei cooped up in his bedroom, where he claims that he can no longer play the piano, as he was scared of losing the ones he cares about. Kōsei returns to school and finds a note in his desk from Ryōta and written by Kaori, who had just been released from the intensive care unit. Kōsei carries her to the roof of the hospital as it begins to snow. Kaori tells Kōsei about an upcoming risky surgery that she was undergoing, taking place the same day as the piano competition finals, because she was inspired by him to fight for life. She stands up and pretends to hold her violin again, but soon collapses and falls into his arms, crying and dreading her fate. On the day of the surgery and finals, Kōsei breaks down right before his performance. However, he hears Tsubaki sneeze from the audience, reminding him that he still has friends who support him, and begins playing.
22	"Spring Wind"; Transliteration: "Harukaze" (Japanese: 春風)	Kyōhei Ishiguro; Miyuki Kuroki	Takao Yoshioka	Kyōhei Ishiguro	March 20, 2015	
Kōsei performs his set piece with his friends and mentor in mind. While playing, he has a vision of himself floating in the clouds and sees Kaori playing the violin alongside him. However, Kaori gradually disappears as lights rush from the sky to take her away. Realizing that her surgery was unsuccessful, Kōsei begs her not to leave him. When Kōsei completes his performance, tears run down his face as he says his final farewell to her. Later, Kōsei receives a letter from Kaori through her parents at the funeral and Nao encourages Tsubaki to reconcile with Kōsei. As spring approaches, Kōsei finally reads the letter, which reveals that Kaori had admired Kōsei as a child and was influenced to play the violin with him someday. She was overjoyed to be in the same junior high school as him, but she could not find the confidence to speak with him. However, upon learning that she did not have much time left to live, she lied to Tsubaki that she was in love with Ryōta in a bid to get close to Kōsei without hurting Tsubaki, as Kaori knew that Tsubaki liked Kōsei. She reminisced about all the good times that she spent with Kōsei before posthumously confessing her love for him. The letter also contains a picture of them when they were younger, which Kōsei eventually framed. After finishing the letter, Tsubaki finally reaches out to Kōsei and tells him that he will never be alone. During the piano competition finals, Kōsei performs Chopin's First Ballade, featuring two themes with variations as well as a thundering coda. Kōsei plays this piece to reach out to Kaori, even though her surgery was unsuccessful, as it reflects a farewell gesture of losing the one who he truly loves.
OVA	"Moments"	Kazuya Iwata	Takao Yoshioka	Kazuya Iwata	May 15, 2015 (Note: Moments is an OVA episode released with the special edition of the 11th manga volume, ISBN 978-4-06-358752-4.)	
Set years before the events of the first episode, Kōsei is seen performing at his first piano recital, with Emi and Takeshi in the audience. As Emi listens to the recital, she cried during the performance and decided on that day to become a pianist, soon developing feelings for Kōsei. At the next performance, Emi sits next to Kōsei to gain his attention, but he ignores her entirely and focuses on his sheet music. Takeshi then joins them, revealing that he decided to play piano in order to receive a toy robot hero. However, Takeshi admired Kōsei as a hero after listening to his performance. At the next piano competition, Kōsei wins first place, though he chooses to ignore the results. Emi and Takeshi develop a rivalry with Kōsei since he has always been placed first in every piano competition thus far. Emi and Takeshi are seen discussing their future before the following piano competition, moments before Kōsei comes and sits on the same bench with them.

== Home video release ==
Aniplex released the series on DVD and Blu-ray in nine volumes, with the first volume being released on February 25, 2015, and the final volume being released on October 28, 2015. The series was later dubbed into English and released in two volumes in North America by Aniplex of America, with the first volume being released on March 29, 2016. In Australia and New Zealand, Madman Entertainment released the series in two volumes, with the first being released on July 6, 2016. In the United Kingdom, Anime Limited released the series in two volumes, with the first volume being released on November 14, 2016.

In 2020, Aniplex compiled the nine volumes and the OVA episode into a complete box set, scheduling the release for April 1, 2020.

Aniplex (Region 2 - Japan)
Vol.	Episodes	Release date	Ref.
1	1	February 25, 2015	
2	2–3	March 25, 2015	
3	4–5	April 22, 2015	
4	6–7	May 27, 2015	
5	8–10	June 24, 2015	
6	11–13	July 22, 2015	
7	14–16	August 26, 2015	
8	17–19	September 23, 2015	
9	20–22	October 28, 2015	
Complete	1–22 + OVA	April 1, 2020	

Aniplex of America (Region 1 / A - North America)
Vol.	Episodes	Release date	Ref.
1	1–11	March 29, 2016	
2	12–22	May 31, 2016	

Madman Entertainment (Region 4 / B - Australia / New Zealand)
Vol.	Episodes	Release date	DVD Ref.	Blu-ray Ref.
1	1–11	July 6, 2016		
2	12–22	August 3, 2016		

Anime Limited (Region 2 / B - United Kingdom)
Vol.	Episodes	Release date	DVD Ref.	Blu-ray Ref.
1	1–11	November 14, 2016		
2	12–22	May 8, 2017		
