= Your Lie in April (musical) =

2022 stage musical

Your Lie In April
- Music: Frank Wildhorn
- Lyrics: Tracy Miller; Carly Robyn Green
- Book: Riko Sakaguchi (Japanese); Rinne B. Groff (English)
- Basis: Your Lie in April by Naoshi Arakawa
- Productions: 2022 Tokyo World Premiere; 2024 London Concert Premiere; 2024 West End; 2024 Seoul Korean Premiere

Your Lie in April is a musical based on the manga series Your Lie in April written and illustrated by Naoshi Arakawa. The show features a score with music by Broadway composer Frank Wildhorn and lyrics by Tracy Miller and Carly Robyn Green, a Japanese book by Riko Sakaguchi, an English-language book by Rinne B. Groff, and arrangements and orchestrations by Jason Howland. The show is a co-production between Toho Co. Ltd. and Fuji Television.

== Productions ==
After delays due to the COVID-19 pandemic, the show made its world premiere in May 2022 at the Nissay Theatre in Tokyo, directed by Ikko Ueda. The original Japanese cast featured Yuta Koseki and Tatsunari Kimura as Kosei Arima (double cast), J-pop singer and former Nogizaka46 member Erika Ikuta as Kaori Miyazono, Fuka Yuduki as Tsubaki Sawabe, and Koki Mizuta and Takuto Teranishi as Ryota Watari (double cast). A nationwide tour followed throughout Japan, featuring the original cast.

An English-language concert staging, with direction by Nick Winston and produced by Carter Dixon McGill Productions, Indie Theatricals, and internet personality Matthew Patrick, ran from April 8 to 9 at the Theatre Royal, Drury Lane on London's West End to rave reviews. Zheng Xi Yong and Rumi Sutton led as Kosei and Kaori, while Rachel Clare Chan and Dean John-Wilson returned from the Death Note concerts as Tsubaki and Watari. Joanna Ampil portrayed Kosei's mother. Justin Williams was the designer of the Death Note concerts and Your Lie in April.

Weeks after its preview West End concert run, a full West End production was announced. The show began previews on 28 June 2024 and officially opened on 5 July 2024, where it received mixed-to-positive reviews from critics. It was initially set to run until 21 September 2024 at the Harold Pinter Theatre but closed early on 11 August 2024.

A Korean premiere in Seoul opened in June 2024 and ran through August 2024 at the CJ Towol Theatre at the Seoul Performing Arts Center. Produced by EMK Musical Company, the show will star K-Pop idols and TV/film stars triple cast and double cast as leads: Lee Hong-ki from FT Island, Yoon So-ho, and Kim Hee-jae as Kosei; Lee Bom-sori, Kei from Lovelyz and EL7Z Up, and Jung Ji-so from Parasite as Kaori; Lee Jae-jin from FT Island, Kim Jin-wook, and Cho Hwan-ji as Watari; and Park Si-in and Hwang Woo-rim as Tsubaki.

A second Japanese production premiered in August 2025 in Tokyo. The cast featured Kurumu Okamiya and Misato Higashijima as Kosei Arima (double cast), Ririka Kato and former Juice=Juice member Karin Miyamoto as Kaori Miyazono (double cast), Shio Kisui and Saki Yamamoto as Tsubaki Sawabe (double cast), and Masato Yoshihara and Taisei Shima as Ryota Watari (double cast). A nationwide tour followed throughout Japan, featuring the 2025 cast.

== Cast and characters ==
Character	Tokyo	London concert	West End
Character	2022	2024	
Kosei Arima	Yuta Koseki	Zheng Xi Yong	Zheng Xi Yong
Kosei Arima	Tatsunari Kimura	Zheng Xi Yong	Zheng Xi Yong
Kaori Miyazono	Erika Ikuta	Rumi Sutton	Mia Kobayashi
Tsubaki Sawabe	Fuka Yuduki	Rachel Clare Chan	Rachel Clare Chan
Ryota Watari	Koki Mizuta	Dean John-Wilson	Dean John-Wilson
Ryota Watari	Takuto Teranishi	Dean John-Wilson	Dean John-Wilson

== Cast albums and recordings ==
A Japanese-language concept album with 11 songs from the show was released in 2020, featuring Erika Ikuta, Yuta Koseki, Tatsunari Kimura, Fuka Yuduki, and Koki Mizuta.

On March 28, 2025, a cast recording of the fully staged London production was announced, releasing on April 4, 2025. Alongside the announcement, the duet "Catch A Shooting Star" was released early as a single.

Your Lie in April, Studio Cast Japan 2020
No.	Title	Lyrics	Music	Performer	Length
1.	"If I Can't Hear the Music"	Carly Robyn Green / Tracy Miller	Frank Wildhorn	Yuta Koseki / Tatsunari Kimura	5:25
2.	"Just Like a Movie"	Carly Robyn Green / Tracy Miller	Frank Wildhorn	Yuta Koseki / Tatsunari Kimura	3:39
3.	"Who Put You in Charge Here?"	Carly Robyn Green / Tracy Miller	Frank Wildhorn	Yuta Koseki / Tatsunari Kimura / Erika Ikuta	3:14
4.	"Perfect"	Carly Robyn Green / Tracy Miller	Frank Wildhorn	Erika Ikuta	3:56
5.	"The Beautiful Game"	Carly Robyn Green / Tracy Miller	Frank Wildhorn	Koki Mizuta	4:30
6.	"Where's My Superhero?"	Carly Robyn Green / Tracy Miller	Frank Wildhorn	Fuka Yuduki	4:51
7.	"Speed of Sound"	Carly Robyn Green / Tracy Miller	Frank Wildhorn	Erika Ikuta / Fuka Yuduki / Yuta Koseki / Tatsunari Kimura / Koki Mizuta	3:22
8.	"Catch a Shooting Star"	Carly Robyn Green / Tracy Miller	Frank Wildhorn	Erika Ikuta / Yuta Koseki / Tatsunari Kimura	4:18
9.	"One Hundred Thousand Million Stars"	Carly Robyn Green / Tracy Miller	Frank Wildhorn	Erika Ikuta / Yuta Koseki / Tatsunari Kimura	3:41
10.	"100 Lost Days"	Carly Robyn Green / Tracy Miller	Frank Wildhorn	Fuka Yuduki / Yuta Koseki / Tatsunari Kimura / Koki Mizuta	4:53
11.	"I Can Hear You"	Carly Robyn Green / Tracy Miller	Frank Wildhorn	Yuta Koseki / Tatsunari Kimura	3:47

Despite having eighteen tracks compared to the 2022 Japanese Cast Recording, the 2025 London Cast Recording has a couple of notable omissions, removing "The Beautiful Game", which was cut from the fully staged London production, as well as "Who Put You In Charge?"

Several songs have dialogue interspersed in the song, such as "If I Can't Hear The Music", "I Can Hear You", and "Perfect / One Note 2".

Your Lie in April: The Musical: London Cast Recording (2025)
No.	Title	Lyrics	Music	Performer(s)	Length
1.	"If I Can't Hear the Music"	Carly Robyn Green / Tracy Miller	Frank Wildhorn	Zheng Xi Yong, Lucy Park, Ensemble	6:03
2.	"This Is Our Time"	Carly Robyn Green / Tracy Miller	Frank Wildhorn	Rachel Clare Chan, Dean John Wilson, Zheng Xi Yong, Ensemble	2:36
3.	"One Note"	Carly Robyn Green / Tracy Miller	Frank Wildhorn	Ensemble	2:24
4.	"Perfect / One Note 2"	Carly Robyn Green / Tracy Miller	Frank Wildhorn	Mia Kobayashi, Zheng Xi Yong, Ensemble	6:51
5.	"Just Like A Movie"	Carly Robyn Green / Tracy Miller	Frank Wildhorn	Zheng Xi Yong	3:13
6.	"Where's My Superhero?"	Carly Robyn Green / Tracy Miller	Frank Wildhorn	Rachel Clare Chan	2:59
7.	"One Note 3 / At Last"	Carly Robyn Green / Tracy Miller	Frank Wildhorn	Ernest Stroud, Ericka Posadas, Ensemble	2:54
8.	"4.9 (Speed of Sound)"	Carly Robyn Green / Tracy Miller	Frank Wildhorn	Rachel Clare Chan, Dean John Wilson, Zheng Xi Yong, Mia Kobayashi, Ensemble	3:08
9.	"In Your Hands"	Carly Robyn Green / Tracy Miller	Frank Wildhorn	Mia Kobayashi, Zheng Xi Yong	4:09
10.	"One Single Moment"	Carly Robyn Green / Tracy Miller	Frank Wildhorn	Zheng Xi Yong, Lucy Park, Theo Oh, Ensemble	2:56
11.	"Catch A Shooting Star"	Carly Robyn Green / Tracy Miller	Frank Wildhorn	Mia Kobayashi, Zheng Xi Yong	4:20
12.	"Look How Far We've Come"	Carly Robyn Green / Tracy Miller	Frank Wildhorn	Ericka Posadas, Ernest Stroud, Ensemble	1:35
13.	"Home Free"	Carly Robyn Green / Tracy Miller	Frank Wildhorn	Zheng Xi Yong, Theo Oh, Lucy Park, Ensemble	4:19
14.	"Come Find Me"	Carly Robyn Green / Tracy Miller	Frank Wildhorn	Mia Kobayashi	2:48
15.	"One Hundred Thousand Million Stars"	Carly Robyn Green / Tracy Miller	Frank Wildhorn	Mia Kobayashi, Zheng Xi Yong	3:24
16.	"100 Lost Days"	Carly Robyn Green / Tracy Miller	Frank Wildhorn	Dean John Wilson, Zheng Xi Yong, Rachel Clare Chan, Ensemble	3:38
17.	"I Can Hear You"	Carly Robyn Green / Tracy Miller	Frank Wildhorn	Zheng Xi Yong, Mia Kobayashi, Ensemble	6:11
18.	"Rachmaninoff, Prelude in G Minor, Op. 23" (Bonus track)	N/A	Sergei Rachmaninoff	Zheng Xi Yong	4:42

== Songs ==
This is a list of the songs in the show. Songs that are featured on the Japanese concept recording have characters' names listed next to the titles. Act 1 and Act 2 are not guaranteed to be split like they are here.

=== 2022 and 2025 Japanese Productions ===
Act 1

- "If I Can't Hear The Music" – Kousei Arima
- "This Is Our Time" – Kousei, Ryota Watari, Tsubaki Sawabe
- "Perfect" – Kaori Miyazono
- "One Note"
- "Just Like A Movie" – Kousei
- "The Beautiful Game" – Watari, Company
- "Who Put You In Charge Here?" – Kaori, Kousei
- "Where's My Superhero?" – Tsubaki
- "I Can See You Now"
- "I'm Scared"
- "Speed of Sound" – Full Cast

Act 2

- "In Your Hands"
- "One Single Moment"
- "Catch A Shooting Star" – Kaori, Kousei
- "Look How Far We've Come"
- "Come Find Me"
- "Edge of the World"
- "One Hundred Thousand Million Stars" – Kaori, Kousei
- "100 Lost Days" – Kousei, Watari, Tsubaki
- "I Can Hear You" – Kousei

=== 2024 London Concert Production ===
Act 1

- "If I Can't Hear The Music" – Kōsei, Kōsei's Mother
- "This Is Our Time" – Ensemble
- "Perfect (reprise) – Kaori
- "One Note" – Ensemble
- "Perfect/One Note 2" – Kaori, Ensemble
- "One Note 3" – Ensemble
- "Just Like A Movie" – Kōsei
- "The Beautiful Game" – Watari, Ensemble
- "Who Put You In Charge Here?" – Kaori, Kōsei
- "Where's My Superhero?" – Tsubaki
- "One Note 4/At Last" – Ensemble, Kaori
- "This Is Our Time (Reprise) – Kaori, Kōsei
- "4.9 (Speed of Sound)" – Ensemble/ Full Cast
- "In Your Hands" – Kaori, Kōsei

Act 2

- "One Single Moment"
- "Just Like A Movie (Reprise)"
- "Catch A Shooting Star" – Kaori, Kōsei
- "If I Can't Hear The Music (Reprise)"
- "Home Free"
- "Come Find Me" – Kaori
- "One Hundred Thousand Million Stars" – Kōsei, Kaori
- "100 Lost Days" – Kōsei, Watari, Tsubaki
- "Perfect (Reprise)"
- "One Single Moment (Reprise)
- "I Can Hear You" – Kōsei, Kaori, Ensemble
