= Tears of Heaven (musical) =

2011 Korean musical set in the Vietnam War

- A New Musical
- Original Seoul poster
- Music: Frank Wildhorn
- Lyrics: Robin Lerner
- Book: Phoebe Hwang
- Productions: 2011 Seoul

Tears from Heaven is a musical with a book by Phoebe Hwang, lyrics by Robin Lerner, and music by Frank Wildhorn. It is set during the Vietnam War.

== Plot ==
Vietnam, 1968: A love triangle between a beautiful Vietnamese singer, a Korean private, and an American Colonel set against the backdrop of the days leading up to and during the Tet Offensive. The tale follows our leads to Seoul, Korea, and San Francisco's Chinatown.

== Songs ==
- Between Heaven and Earth
- Shadows On My Heart
- Pearl of The East
- The First Time I Saw Paris
- The Tiger and The Dove
- Who Can You Trust
- Morning Comes
- I've Never Loved Like This
- Can You Hear Me?
- I've Had To Learn
- The End of The World
- Tears From Heaven
- Moving On
- Raining Fire
- Without Her
- Sweet Song of Life
- This Is My Confession
- Tiger and The Dove Finale

== Production ==
The musical had a reading in September 2009 in New York, featuring Deborah Lew, Paolo Montalban and John Cudia, and direction by Gabriel Barre.

An English language concept recording was released on Global Vision Records, featuring Linda Eder, Rob Evan and Christiane Noll.

The musical premiered in South Korea in 2011 at the National Theater in Seoul. Directed by Gabriel Barre, the cast featured Junsu and Brad Little.
