= No Longer Human (musical) =

2021 musical

No Longer Human is a 2021 musical theatre adaptation of Japanese novelist Osamu Dazai's 1948 novel No Longer Human, by American composer Frank Wildhorn with English lyrics by Tracy Miller and Carly Robyn Green, and Chinese lyrics by Ya Wen and Mingzhu Zheng. Produced by Shanghai-based production company Ranspace, the show features orchestrations by Kim Scharnberg, direction by Ney Hasegawa, music conduction by Yuzhuo Sun, music programming by Siyang Chen, Shaochen Cai and Kailin Huang. It marks Wildhorn's first original Chinese musical.

The show made a world premiere at the Shanghai Grand Theatre in December 2021, followed by a multi-city tour throughout China. The first round of performances had 12 shows, with a total box office of nearly 9 million yuan (close to $1 million) and 15,000 audiences. It was initially set to tour China again in 2024, but soon announced the second round in 2022, and the third round in 2023 while releasing the original cast recording. It was crowned by critics as the top musical theatre performance of 2021 in China. In 2024 it has reached 30 cities, 90 shows and 200,000 audiences.

The original musical cast stars Chinese pop singer Pax Congo and theatre actor/singer Liam Liu. It is also known as The Human Disqualification in translation.

== Awards ==
Year	Award	Category	Nominee(s)	Result	Ref.
2023	Performing Arts World Musical Awards	Annual Outstanding Musicals	N/A	Won	

Year	Award	Category	Nominee(s)	Result	Ref.
2023	Beijing Tianqiao Annual Musical Ceremony	Outstanding Female Musical Performer	Chen, Tian	Won	
2023	Beijing Tianqiao Annual Musical Ceremony	Outstanding Male Musical Performer	Liu, Lingfei	Won	
2023	Beijing Tianqiao Annual Musical Ceremony	Outstanding Musical Producer	Liang, Yibing	Won	
2023	Beijing Tianqiao Annual Musical Ceremony	Outstanding Director	Xu, Chongye & Hasegawa, Yasushi	Won	
2023	Beijing Tianqiao Annual Musical Ceremony	Outstanding Book Writer	Wen, Ya & Zhang, Mingzhu	Won	
2023	Beijing Tianqiao Annual Musical Ceremony	Outstanding Choreography	Hasegawa, Yasushi	Won	
