= Rinne Groff =

American playwright and performer

Rinne Groff (aka Rinne Becker Groff) is an American playwright and performer.

== Biography ==
Groff was trained at Yale University and New York University Tisch School of the Arts, where she currently teaches.

A founding member of Elevator Repair Service Theater Company, she has been a part of the writing, staging, and performing of their shows since the company's inception in 1991. She is at work on a commission from The Guthrie Theater in Minneapolis.

With playwright/lyricist John Dempsey and composer Michael Friedman, Groff co-wrote the book and lyrics for the stage musical adaptation of the movie Saved!. Her play Compulsion opened Off-Broadway at The Public Theater on February 1, 2011, starring Mandy Patinkin and directed by Oskar Eustis. The play had previously played at Yale Repertory Theatre and Berkeley Repertory Theatre, both in 2010.

Alongside composer Frank Wildhorn and lyricists Tracy Miller and Carly Robyn Green, Groff wrote an English language book for the stage musical Your Lie in April, based on its original Japanese manga book by Riko Sakaguchi. The musical is an adaptation of Naoshi Arakawa's Kodansha manga Your Lie in April. In November 2023, an English language concert staging of Your Lie in April (musical) was announced to debut at Theatre Royal, Drury Lane on the West End in April 2024, directed by Nick Winston. It opened at the Harold Pinter Theatre in July 2024.

== Awards ==
- Recipient of a 2006 Guggenheim Award
- Recipient of a 2005 Whiting Award for drama
- Finalist for the Susan Smith Blackburn Prize in 2002-03 for her play Orange Lemon Egg Canary
- Fellowship from the MacDowell Colony in 2005.

== Works ==
- Inky (Clubbed Thumb and Salt Theater, 2000)
- The Five Hysterical Girls Theorem (Target Margin Theater, 2000)
- Jimmy Carter was a Democrat (produced at Clubbed Thumb and P.S. 122, 2002)
- Orange Lemon Egg Canary (Actors Theater of Louisville, 2003)
- You Never Know (co-writer with Charles Strouse) (Trinity Rep, 2005)
- Molière Impromptu (Trinity Rep, 2005)
- The Ruby Sunrise (Public Theater, November 2005, directed by Oskar Eustis)
- What Then (Clubbed Thumb, 2006)
- Compulsion (2010, Yale Repertory Theatre, 2010)
- Sleep Rock Thy Brain along with Lucas Hnath and Anne Washburn (Actors Theater of Louisville, 2013)
- 77% (San Francisco Playhouse, 2014)
- Fire in Dreamland (Public Theater, 2018)
- Your Lie in April (musical) - The Concert ( Theatre Royal Drury Lane, 2024)
