= Nan Knighton =

American dramatist

- Born: c. 1947; Baltimore, Maryland, U.S.
- Education: Bryn Mawr School; Sarah Lawrence College; Boston University
- Occupation: Playwright

Nan Knighton is an American poet, playwright, and lyricist.

== Early life ==
Knighton was born in Baltimore in 1947 to physician Donald Proctor and artist Janice Proctor. She is a 1965 graduate of Bryn Mawr School, with an undergraduate degree from Sarah Lawrence College and a master's degree in creative writing from Boston University.

== Career ==
After writing for the Maryland Center for Public Broadcasting television show Consumer Survival Kit, Knighton became notable for two Broadway shows. She wrote the libretto and lyrics for The Scarlet Pimpernel (1997), earning a nomination for the 1998 Tony Award for Best Book of a Musical. Knighton also adapted the book for the Saturday Night Fever musical, with a West End opening in 1998, and a Broadway transfer in 1999.

Her collaboration with Scarlet Pimpernel composer Frank Wildhorn continued with Camille Claudel (2003), as well as additional lyrics for Rudolf (2006).

Knighton authored the plays Bad Dreams and Man With Two Hearts Found on Moon.

== Personal life ==
She is married to producer and lawyer John Breglio.
