= Your Lie in April =

Manga series by Naoshi Arakawa and its franchise

- First tankōbon volume cover, featuring Kōsei Arima (left) and Kaori Miyazono (right)

四月は君の嘘 (Shigatsu wa Kimi no Uso)
- Genre: Romantic drama
- Manga
- Written by: Naoshi Arakawa
- Published by: Kodansha
- English publisher: NA: Kodansha USA
- Imprint: Monthly Shōnen Magazine Comics
- Magazine: Monthly Shōnen Magazine
- Original run: April 6, 2011 – February 6, 2015
- Volumes: 11
- Anime television series
- Directed by: Kyōhei Ishiguro
- Written by: Takao Yoshioka
- Music by: Masaru Yokoyama
- Studio: A-1 Pictures
- Licensed by: AUS: Madman Entertainment; BI: Anime Limited; NA: Aniplex of America
- Original network: Fuji TV, KTV (Noitamina)
- Original run: October 10, 2014 – March 20, 2015
- Episodes: 22
- Light novel

Your Lie in April – A Six Person Etude
- Written by: Yui Tokiumi
- Published by: Kodansha
- English publisher: NA: Vertical
- Published: November 17, 2014
- Manga

Shigatsu wa Kimi no Uso: Coda
- Written by: Naoshi Arakawa
- Imprint: Monthly Shōnen Magazine Comics
- Published: August 17, 2016
- Original video animation

Moments
- Directed by: Kazuya Iwata
- Written by: Takao Yoshioka
- Music by: Masaru Yokoyama
- Studio: A-1 Pictures
- Released: May 15, 2015
- Runtime: 23 minutes
- Live-action film
- Your Lie in April (2016)
- Stage musical
- Your Lie in April: The Musical (2020)
- icon

Your Lie in April (Japanese: 四月は君の嘘, Hepburn: Shigatsu wa Kimi no Uso; lit. 'April Is Your Lie') is a Japanese romantic drama manga series written and illustrated by Naoshi Arakawa. It was serialized in Kodansha's magazine Monthly Shōnen Magazine from April 2011 to February 2015. The story follows a young pianist named Kо̄sei Arima, who loses the ability to play the piano after his mother's death, and his experiences after he meets violinist Kaori Miyazono.

The manga series originated from a one-shot comic that Arakawa entered in a competition; he based the series on it and drew inspiration from the existence of musical manga, such as Beck and Nodame Cantabile. A-1 Pictures adapted Your Lie in April into an anime television series that was aired on Fuji TV's Noitamina block from October 2014 to March 2015, and an original video animation (OVA) episode was released in May 2015. A live-action film adaptation of the same name was released in September 2016. Various stage play adaptations have also been produced.

In 2013, the manga won the 37th Kodansha Manga Award in the shōnen category. By June 2017, Your Lie in April had over 5 million copies in circulation. The manga received mixed reviews; several critics praised its plot and characters but criticized the artwork and emotional aspect. However, the anime adaptation was largely praised for its plot, animation, and soundtrack.

== Plot ==
Fourteen-year-old piano prodigy Kōsei Arima becomes famous after winning several music competitions. When his mother Saki dies, Kōsei has a mental breakdown while performing at a piano recital; this results in him becoming unable to hear the sound of his piano. He sees the notes fly off the sheet music and can only hear the thud of the keys coming down no matter how hard he plays the notes, even though his hearing is otherwise unaffected.

Two years later, Kōsei has not touched the piano and views the world in monochrome. He does not focus on excelling in any activities and often spends time with his friends Tsubaki Sawabe and Ryōta Watari. Kōsei meets Kaori Miyazono, an audacious, free-spirited, fourteen-year-old violinist whose playing style reflects her manic personality. Kaori helps Kōsei return to playing the piano and shows him his playing style can be free and groundbreaking. As Kaori continues to lift Kōsei's spirits, he quickly realizes he loves her, although she seems to only be interested in Ryōta.

During a performance, Kaori, who later explains that she is anemic and needs routine testing, collapses and is hospitalized. She invites Kōsei to play with her at a gala but she does not arrive. As Kōsei competes against Takeshi Aiza and Emi Igawa, two fourteen-year-olds who were inspired to play the piano after seeing Kōsei's performances when they were younger, Kaori's health deteriorates and she becomes dejected. Kōsei befriends Takeshi's younger sister Nagi and plays a duet with her, which motivates Kaori to attempt a risky and potentially deadly surgery so she may possibly play with Kōsei once more. While playing in the finals of the Eastern Japan Piano Competition, Kōsei sees Kaori's spirit accompanying him and realizes she has died during the surgery.

At her funeral, Kaori's parents give Kōsei a letter from Kaori that reveals she was aware of her impending death and became more free-spirited, both as a person and in her music, so she would not take her regrets to Heaven. She confesses she had been in love with Kōsei's piano playing since watching him perform at a concert when she was five, the same concert that had also inspired Emi. This inspired Kaori to play the violin so she could play with him one day. Kaori fabricated her feelings towards Ryōta so she could get closer to Kōsei without hurting Tsubaki, who harbored affection for Kōsei. She then confesses her love for him. Tsubaki comforts Kōsei and tells him she will be by his side. Kaori also leaves behind a picture of herself as a child, coming back from the concert that inspired her, with Kōsei in the background. Kōsei later frames this picture.

== Characters ==
Kōsei Arima (有馬 公生, Arima Kōsei)
Voiced by: Natsuki Hanae (Japanese); Max Mittelman (English)
Portrayed by: Kento Yamazaki (live-action film), Shintarō Anzai (stage play)
Kōsei is a former child prodigy in playing piano, dubbed the "Human Metronome" for his mechanical accuracy, a product of his mother Saki's strict method of teaching. When Saki dies, Kōsei becomes unable to hear the sound of his piano playing and he gives up on it. The only piano he plays is double-checking sheet music for his part-time job. Two years later, he takes up the piano again after Kaori Miyazono persuades him to become her accompanist. Influenced by her emotional and unrestrained playing style, Kōsei falls in love with her.
Kaori Miyazono (宮園 かをり, Miyazono Kawori)
Voiced by: Risa Taneda (Japanese); Erica Lindbeck (English)
Portrayed by: Suzu Hirose (live-action film), Arisa Matsunaga (stage play)
Kaori is Tsubaki's classmate, a free-spirited violinist who has been criticized by judging panels for her unwillingness to adhere strictly to the score but is popular with audiences. Kaori meets Kōsei when she asks Tsubaki to set her up with Ryōta. As their friendship grows, she eventually convinces Kōsei to play the piano again, first as her accompanist and later in a piano competition. Halfway into the series, it is discovered that she has a medical condition and has undergone multiple surgeries because of it. Kaori later undergoes an extremely risky surgery and dies during the operation.
Tsubaki Sawabe (澤部 椿, Sawabe Tsubaki)
Voiced by: Ayane Sakura (Japanese); Erica Mendez (English)
Portrayed by: Anna Ishii (live-action film), Misato Kawauchi (stage play)
Tsubaki is Kōsei's childhood friend and next-door neighbor, who treats him like a younger brother. Concerned by his inability to move past his mother's death, she encourages him to return to playing the piano. Having supported him through both triumphs and hardships, she believes he seemed more admirable when he played. Initially unaware of her own feelings, she gradually realizes she has fallen in love with him.
Ryōta Watari (渡 亮太, Watari Ryōta)
Voiced by: Ryōta Ōsaka (Japanese); Kyle McCarley (English)
Portrayed by: Taishi Nakagawa (live-action film), Masanari Wada (stage play)
Ryōta is Kōsei's and Tsubaki's childhood friend. Kaori was his girlfriend, which makes Kōsei jealous. Kōsei later tells him about his feelings for Kaori; Ryōta accepts this and gives him advice.
Takeshi Aiza (相座 武士, Aiza Takeshi)
Voiced by: Yūki Kaji (Japanese); Erik Scott Kimerer (English)
Portrayed by: Shōjirō Yokoi (stage play)
Takeshi is a pianist of the same age as Kōsei; he has wanted to surpass Kōsei on the piano since watching him play at a young age. He sees Kōsei as a rival and was excited when Kōsei Arima entered the Maihou Piano Competition again; after disappearing from piano competitions.
Emi Igawa (井川 絵見, Igawa Emi)
Voiced by: Saori Hayami (Japanese); Erika Harlacher (English)
Portrayed by: Haruka Yamashita (stage play)
Emi is a pianist of the same age as Kōsei; she decided to become a pianist after listening to Kōsei play at the age of five. She aims to reach Kōsei through her emotional playing style.
Nagi Aiza (相座 凪, Aiza Nagi)
Voiced by: Ai Kayano (Japanese); Stephanie Sheh (English)
Nagi is Takeshi's younger sister who pretends to ask for tutelage from Hiroko to scout her brother's rival Kōsei. She eventually becomes Kōsei's student. She and Kōsei play a duet at Nagi's school.
Saki Arima (有馬 早希, Arima Saki)
Voiced by: Mamiko Noto (Japanese); Wendee Lee (English)
Portrayed by: Rei Dan (live-action film), Ryōko Tanaka (stage play)
Saki is Kōsei's mother who was once a former pianist herself. While she was still alive, she demanded that Kōsei practice the score to absolute perfection, and beat him severely for making mistakes or performing poorly in concert. Her teaching methods escalated to the point where she would not allow her son to play with his friends. Saki did not at first plan to make her son a pianist but after she became aware of his talent and discovers she has a terminal illness, she decided to give Kōsei a strict foundation in piano playing so he can make a living after she dies.
Hiroko Seto (瀬戸 紘子, Seto Hiroko)
Voiced by: Mie Sonozaki (Japanese); Carrie Keranen (English)
Portrayed by: Yuka Itaya (live-action film), Kuniko Kodama (stage play)
Hiroko is a nationally renowned pianist and Saki's close friend from college. Hiroko discovers Kōsei's talents and suggests Saki trains him as a pianist despite Saki's initial disagreement. Blaming herself for Saki's brutal treatment of Kōsei and his psychological trauma from Saki's death, Hiroko distances herself from Kōsei. When Kōsei returns to play the piano, Hiroko becomes his guardian and mentor.
Koharu Seto (瀬戸 小春, Seto Koharu)
Voiced by: Inori Minase (Japanese); Cristina Vee (English)
Hiroko's young daughter who usually clings to her mother's side and is adored by both Kōsei and her mother.
Saitō (斎藤, Saitō)
Voiced by: Kazuyuki Okitsu (Japanese); Robbie Daymond (English)
Saitō is Tsubaki's baseball-playing senior and her target of admiration. Saitō confesses his love for Tsubaki and dates her but suggests they break up after realizing Tsubaki's feelings for Kōsei.
Nao Kashiwagi (柏木 奈緒, Kashiwagi Nao)
Voiced by: Shizuka Ishigami (Japanese); Julie Ann Taylor (English)
Portrayed by: Haruka Igarashi (stage play)
Kashiwagi is one of Tsubaki's good friends, who often gives her advice. Kashiwagi succeeds in breaking Tsubaki's stubbornness and persuades her to realize and declare her feelings for Kōsei. She is on the baseball team with Tsubaki and they sometimes walk home together.

== Development ==
=== Manga ===
When Naoshi Arakawa first wanted to be a manga artist, he entered a one-shot comic, which featured a male and female violinist performing together, into the Monthly Shōnen Magazine Grand Challenge. Arakawa later serialized Sayonara, Football, a manga focusing on association football. After completing the series, he got tired of sports manga and wanted to try something new. For ideas, Arakawa returned to the one-shot. Despite the rejection of his previous music-manga pitch, he settled on creating a music manga. Concerned about competing with the popular manga series Beck, which focuses on rock music, Arakawa decided his new manga would focus on classical music. To differentiate it from Nodame Cantabile, another classical-music-themed manga, Arakawa focused on a single instrument. Arakawa interviewed composer Akinori Osawa and pianist Masanori Sugano, and photographed pianist Kaori Yamazaki and violinist Rieko Ikeda to aid him in his descriptions of classical music. He also used his experience with Kendo to inspire his depiction of the tension at competitions. Arakawa also read books about music and asked his editor, who had violin experience, for help.

Arakawa decided to focus on the violin after seeing a female violinist perform on television. Arakawa originally wanted to include a male and female violinist but found scenes with two violinists difficult to draw without the panels growing visually stale, citing a lack of knowledge about classical music, so he opted for a violinist and pianist instead. After the manga's third volume was published in Japan, he received an offer to develop it into an anime. Arakawa, as well as many members of the show's production team, were originally unsure about the ending of the story, but the anime's director Kyōhei Ishiguro liked the ending, so Arakawa did not change it.

=== Anime ===
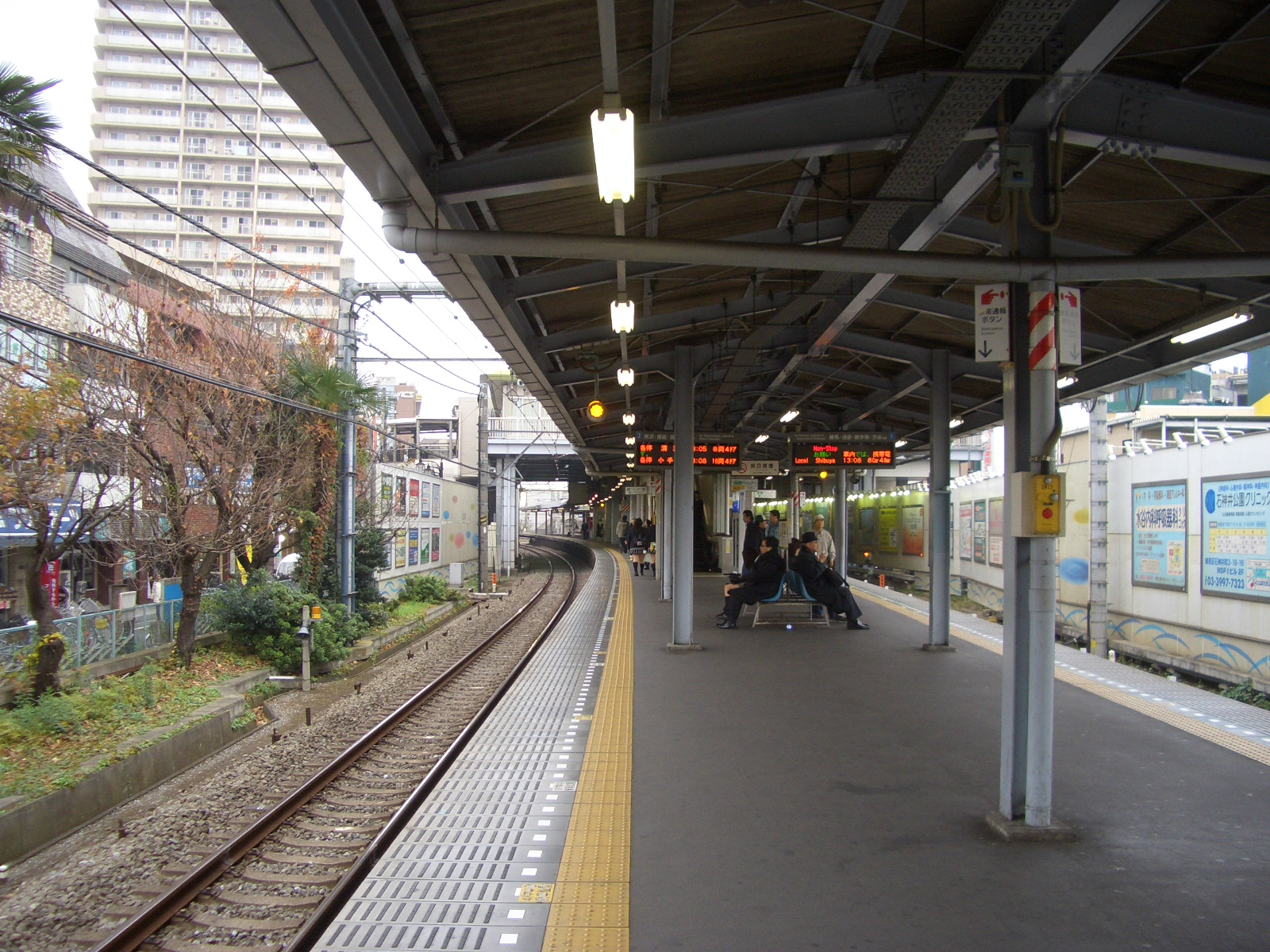
The Ōizumi-gakuen Station, one of the locations used as inspiration for the series

Around the time of the release of the manga's third volume, Aniplex producer Shunsuke Saitō offered Kensuke Tateishi at Kodansha an opportunity to produce an anime adaptation of the series for television. The original offer was for an eleven-episode series but Tateishi rejected the offer because it would not have been a complete adaptation. Saitō changed his offer to 22 episodes, which Tateishi accepted. Saitō offered the role of director to Kyōhei Ishiguro because he had worked with Ishiguro on the seventh episode of Wandering Son and left a strong impression on him.

Because Ishiguro wanted the anime series to appeal to people who did not normally watch anime, he chose the bands Goose House and Wacci to perform the opening and ending themes respectively. Ishiguro wanted to use a song that had a "colorful melody" to match the animation's theme and chose the band Coalamode to perform the theme.

Ishiguro used real locations to represent some of the series' settings. Arakawa had visited several locations along the Seibu Line, such as Ōizumi-gakuen Station, so he showed scenes of the manga to operators of the Seibu Railway Company and officials at the Nerima Ward Office, who helped Isiguro choose appropriate locations.

== Media ==
=== Manga ===
Naoshi Arakawa wrote and illustrated the manga series Your Lie in April, which was first serialized in the May issue of Kodansha's Monthly Shōnen Magazine on April 6, 2011. It ended serialization in the March 2015 issue, which released on February 6, 2015.

Kodansha published the first tankōbon (bound volume) of Your Lie in April on September 16, 2011; the final volume was released in a regular edition and a limited edition on May 15, 2015. A spin-off manga titled Shigatsu wa Kimi no Uso: Coda, was bundled with the Blu-ray release of the anime series and was published in tankōbon format on August 17, 2016. It retold the events of Kōsei's past from the perspective of his friends.

In North America, the series was licensed by Kodansha USA, publishing the first volume on April 21, 2015.

Yui Tokiumi wrote a light novel spinoff titled Your Lie in April: A Six Person Etude, which was released in Japan on November 17, 2014. Vertical published it in English. The light novel retold the events of the main series from Kōsei's friends' and rivals' perspectives.

==== Volumes ====
No.	Original release date	Original ISBN	English release date	English ISBN
1	September 16, 2011	978-4-06-371301-5	May 5, 2015	978-1-63236-171-4
1. "Monotone" (モノトーン, Monotōn); 2. "The Love of a Violinist" (ヴァイオリニストの愛, Vaiorinisuto no Ai); 3. "Black Cat" (黒猫, Kuroneko); 4. "Colorful" (カラフル, Karafuru)
2	January 17, 2012	978-4-06-371317-6	September 1, 2015	978-1-63236-172-1
5. "A Dark Ocean" (暗い海, Kurai Umi); 6. "From Behind" (後ろ姿, Ushirosugata); 7. "Cloudy Skies" (曇天模様, Donten Moyō); 8. "The Water's Surface" (水面, Minamo)
3	May 17, 2012	978-4-06-371327-5	September 1, 2015	978-1-63236-173-8
9. "The Cassette Recording and the Moon" (ラジカセと月, Rajikase to Tsuki); 10. "The Way Home" (帰り道, Kaerimichi); 11. "The Shadow Whispers" (カゲささやく, Kage Sasayaku); 12. "Mirage" (蜃気楼, Shinkirō)
4	September 14, 2012	978-4-06-371345-9	October 27, 2015	978-1-63236-174-5
13. "Surge" (うねる, Uneru); 14. "Red and Yellow" (赤と黄色, Aka to Kiiro); 15. "Resonance" (共鳴, Kyōmei); 16. "Listen, Mama!" (ねえ、ママきいてよ, Nē, Mama Kī Te Yo)
5	January 17, 2013	978-4-06-371359-6	December 29, 2015	978-1-63236-175-2
17. "Falling" (墜ちる, Ochiru); 18. "The Scenery When I'm with You" (君といた景色, Kimi Toita Keshiki); 19. "Along the Railroad Track" (線路沿いの道, Senro-zoi no Michi); 20. "Under the Bridge" (橋の下, Hashi no Shita)
6	May 17, 2013	978-4-06-371375-6	March 29, 2016	978-1-63236-176-9
21. "Candied Apple" (りんご飴, Ringo Ame); 22. "Twinkle, Twinkle, Little Star" (トゥインクルリトルスタ, Tuinkuru Ritoru Sta); 23. "Spurred to Action" (つき動かす, Tsuki Ugokasu); 24. "Rays of Light" (射す光, Sasu Hikari)
7	September 17, 2013	978-4-06-371387-9	April 26, 2016	978-1-63236-177-6
25. "Connection" (つながる, Tsunagaru); 26. "A Chain" (連鎖, Rensa); 27. "Superimposed Outlines" (重なる輪郭, Kasanaru Rinkaku); 28. "Footprints" (足跡, Ashiato)
8	January 17, 2014	978-4-06-371405-0	July 5, 2016	978-1-63236-178-3
29. "Liar" (うそつき, Usotsuki); 30. "Intruder" (闖入者, Chinyūsha); 31. "You'll Do" (君でいいや, Kimi de ī ya); 32. "Two of a Kind" (似た者同士, Nitamono Dōshi)
9	May 16, 2014	978-4-06-371418-0	August 30, 2016	978-1-63236-179-0
33. "Twilight" (トワイライト, Towairaito); 34. "Those Who Gaze into the Abyss" (深淵をのぞく者, Shin'en o Nozoku Mono); 35. "Hearts Intertwining" (心重ねる, Kokoro Kasaneru); 36. "Punch" (パンチ, Panchi)
10	October 17, 2014	978-4-06-371435-7	November 1, 2016	978-1-63236-180-6
37. "A Promise" (約束, Yakusoku); 38. "Goodbye, Hero" (さよならヒーロー, Sayonara Hīrō); 39. "Caught in the Rain" (雨やどり, Amayadori); 40. "Hand in Hand" (手と手, Te to Te)
11	May 15, 2015	978-4-06-371467-8; 978-4-06-358752-4 (limited edition)	December 27, 2016	978-1-63236-312-1
41. "Snow" (雪, Yuki); 42. "Again" (アゲイン, Agein); 43. "Ballade" (バラード, Barādo); 44. "Spring Breeze" (春風, Harukaze)

=== Anime ===
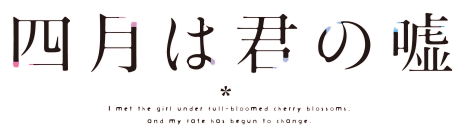
Logo used for the anime TV series

The anime television series of Your Lie in April that A-1 Pictures produced was aired from October 10, 2014, to March 20, 2015, on Fuji TV's Noitamina block. The first opening theme song is "Hikaru Nara" by Goose House and the first ending theme is "Kirameki" (キラメキ; lit. 'Sparkle') by Wacci, both played on episodes 1 through 11. The second opening song is "Nanairo Symphony" (七色シンフォニー, Nanairo Shinfonī; lit. 'Seven Colored Symphony') by Coalamode and the second ending theme is "Orange" (オレンジ, Orenji) by 7!!, both played on episodes 12 through 22. Kyōhei Ishiguro directed the series, Takao Yoshioka wrote the scripts, Yukiko Aikei designed the characters, and Masaru Yokoyama composed the soundtrack. An original video animation (OVA), titled Moments, was bundled with the limited-edition release of the manga's eleventh volume. Most of the staff and cast from the television series reprised their roles in the OVA, which retells Takeshi's and Emi's childhoods and their rivalry with Kōsei.

In North America, Aniplex of America licensed the series and streamed it on various platforms. The series is licensed in the United Kingdom and Ireland by Anime Limited, and in Australia and New Zealand by Madman Entertainment, who streamed it on AnimeLab.

=== Live-action film ===
On August 24, 2015, the website 'kimiuso-movie.jp' was registered by Toho, a Japanese film production and distribution company, leading to speculation a film adaptation of Your Lie in April was in development. Speculations were confirmed in September 2015 when the live-action film's main cast was announced, with Kento Yamazaki as Kōsei Arima, Suzu Hirose as Kaori Miyazono, E-girls member Anna Ishii as Tsubaki Sawabe, and Taishi Nakagawa as Ryōta Watari. Takehiko Shinjō directed the film, which was written by Yukari Tatsui and was released in Japan in September 2016. While the original manga depicts the characters in junior high school, the film was set in their second year of high school.

=== Stage adaptations ===
In May 2017, a stage adaptation of Your Lie in April was announced to be in production; the play was staged at AiiA 2.5 Theater Tokyo from August 24 to September 3 of the same year; and at the Umeda Arts Theater in Osaka from September 7–10. Naohiro Ise directed the play and Kaori Miura wrote it. The play included live musical performances from Yuta Matsumura on piano and Shuko Kobayashi on violin. The main cast was Shintarō Anzai as Kōsei Arima, Arisa Matsunaga as Kaori Miyazono, Misato Kawauchi as Tsubaki Sawabe, and Masanari Wada as Ryōta Watari.

On October 10, 2019, Toho and Fuji TV announced a musical adaptation of Your Lie in April would be staged at Tokyo Tatemono Brillia Hall from July 5–29, 2020. Frank Wildhorn composed the music, Tracy Miller and Carly Robyn Green co-wrote the lyrics, Jason Howland arranged the musical, and Ikko Ueda directed it. The adaptation starred Yuta Koseki and Tatsunari Kimura as Kosei Arima, Erika Ikuta as Kaori Miyazono, Fuka Yuduki as Tsubaki Suwabe, and Koki Mizuta and Takuto Teranishi as Ryōta Watari. It was planned to tour the musical nationally following the Tokyo premiere but all performances were indefinitely delayed due to the COVID-19 pandemic. A concept album was released on December 25, 2020, in place of the performances.

In July 2021, it was announced the musical would be staged in May 2022. The world premiere of the musical took place at the Nissay Theatre in Tokyo on May 7, 2022. The premiere was followed by an opening tour throughout Japan in 2022. The English language version of the musical held a West End concert staging at the Theatre Royal, Drury Lane in April 2024. The creative team includes music by Frank Wildhorn, English language book by Rinne Groff, lyrics by Tracy Miller and Carly Robyn Green, arrangements and orchestrations by Jason Howland, and direction by Nick Winston. Following this staging, a full production was announced for a twelve-week run at the Harold Pinter Theatre beginning June 28, 2024.

In September 2024, it was announced the musical will be staged in August and September 2025. The play will take place at the Showa Women's University's Hitomi Memorial Hall in Tokyo, before moving to Aichi and Osaka in September, and Toyama in October. The double cast includes Kurumu Okamiya and Misato Higashijima as Kōsei Arima, Ririka Kato and former Juice=Juice member Karin Miyamoto as Kaori Miyazono, Shio Kisui and Saki Yamamoto as Tsubaki Sawabe, and Masato Yoshihara and Taisei Shima as Ryōta Watari. The music was composed by Frank Wildhorn, lyrics by Tracy Miller and Carly Robyn Green, arrangements and orchestrations by Jason Howland, and translated and directed by Ikko Ueda.

== Reception ==
=== Manga ===
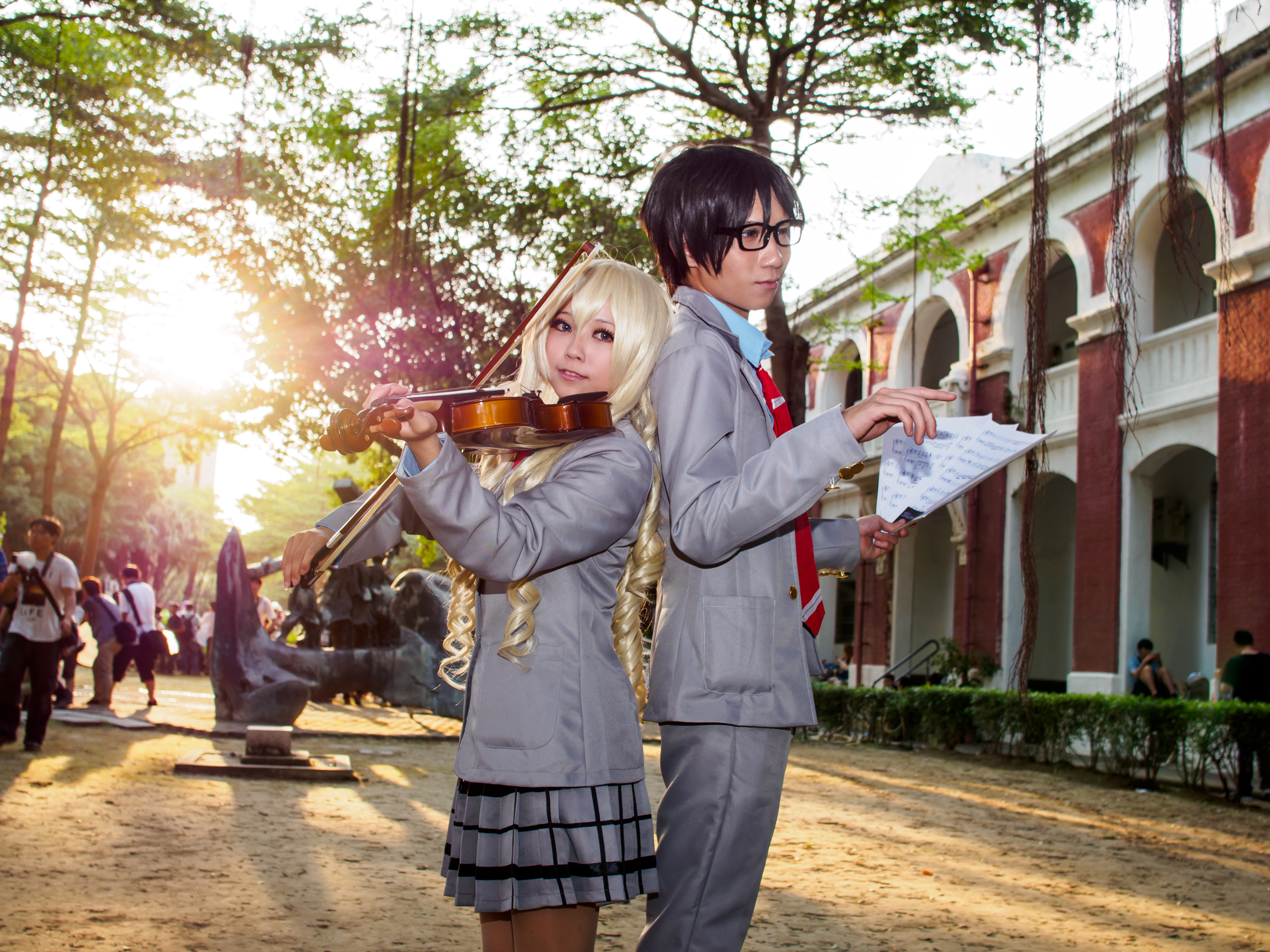
Cosplay of Kaori Miyazono and Kōsei Arima

By June 2017, the manga had over 5 million copies in circulation.

The Your Lie in April manga received mixed reviews. Some critics praised the plot for its realistic portrayal of relationships between the characters. Rebecca Silverman from Anime News Network (ANN) was more critical and said the plot is not as emotional as Arakawa intended it to be. The characters also received mixed responses. Some critics praised Kōsei's relationships and the adult characters for being more developed than adult characters in similar works, whereas others called Kaori mean and said that her actions toward Kōsei were difficult to interpret. A few critics gave the artwork praise for representing the music well, while others said that Arakawa had difficulty drawing characters' faces.

Your Lie in April won the award for the best shōnen manga at the 37th Kodansha Manga Awards. It was also nominated for the fifth Manga Taishō. The series was chosen as one of the best manga in Comic-Con International's Best & Worst Manga of 2016 list. The first volume ranked in the Young Adult Library Services Association's 2016 list of the top 112 graphic novels for teenagers.

=== Anime ===
Unlike the manga, critics largely praised the anime adaptation. Many critics praised the plot; Chris Beveridge of The Fandom Post stated; "plainly said, [the series] moved me", while Chris Homer of the same site called the series a masterpiece of storytelling. However, Theron Martin of ANN opined the plot may not be emotional to every viewer. The anime's characters also received praise, with several critics calling them enjoyable and realistic.

Many critics called the animation beautiful and full of emotion, with Richard Eisenbeis from Kotaku describing it as "utterly superb". Critics also praised the soundtrack, with Allen Moody from THEM Anime Reviews naming the music as an especially impressive aspect. Several reviewers praised the voice acting of both the original Japanese version and the English dub. The series received the Yomiuri Shimbun newspaper's 2016 Sugoi Japan Award in the anime category.
