= Zheng Xi Yong =

Malaysian actor and singer (born 1994)

- Born: Zheng Xi Yong; 15 December 1994 (age 31); Miri, Sarawak, Malaysia
- Education: King's College London (LLB); Royal Academy of Music (MA)
- Occupations: Actor; singer
- Years active: 2018–present

Chinese name
- Traditional Chinese: 楊政熹
- Simplified Chinese: 杨政熹
- Hanyu Pinyin: Yáng Zhèngxī
- Website: zhengxiyong.com

Zheng Xi Yong (/dʒʌŋˈsiː ˈjɒŋ/ jung-SEE YONG; Chinese: 杨政熹; pinyin: Yáng Zhèngxī; born 15 December 1994) is a Malaysian actor and singer. He is known for originating the lead role of Kosei Arima in the West End musical Your Lie in April as well as for his role as Xiang in Boarders. He made his feature film debut in Barbie (2023).

== Early life and education ==
Yong was born in Miri, Sarawak, and grew up in Petaling Jaya, Selangor. He started singing at a young age and competed in Chinese folk singing competitions at school and at regional levels.

Yong studied at The Dickson Poon School of Law, King's College London, where he had received a full scholarship. As an undergraduate, Yong was a member of the university's acapella group, All the King's Men, with whom he performed around the world, including in Milan, New York, and Los Angeles. Yong was also a member of the founding committee of his university's Malaysian Society. He directed the society's stage production, Flavours – The Musical in his final year of study.

Yong earned his Law degree in 2016 and went on to train in musical theatre at the Royal Academy of Music.

== Filmography ==
=== Film ===
Year	Title	Role	Notes
2023	Barbie	An Even Younger Mattel Employee	
2025	Bridget Jones: Mad About the Boy	Linus	

=== Television ===
Year	Title	Role	Notes
2021	Doctors	Mikey Kane	1 episode
2024	Silo	Felix	Series 2, episode 6
2024–2026	Boarders	Xiang	Supporting
2025	Sandokan	Afan	Series 1, episodes 3 and 8
2026	Bridgerton	Lord Barnaby	Series 4, supporting role

=== Theatre ===
Year	Title	Role	Theatre	Notes
2018–2019	Miss Saigon	Ensemble	UK & International Tour	
2019	Assassins	Giuseppe Zangara	Watermill Theatre / Nottingham Playhouse	
2021	Piaf	Lucien and others	Nottingham Playhouse / Leeds Playhouse	
2021–2022	Spring Awakening	Ernst	Almeida Theatre	
2023	The Tempest	Antonio	Shakespeare's Globe	
2024	Your Lie in April	Kosei Arima	Theatre Royal, Drury Lane, West End / Harold Pinter Theatre, West End	
2025	Four Play	Pete	King's Head Theatre	
2026	American Psycho	Luis Carruthers	Almeida Theatre	
