= Rudolf (musical) =

- Affaire Mayerling (Hungarian: Az utolsó csók/The Last Kiss)
- Hungarian Production logo
- Music: Frank Wildhorn
- Lyrics: Jack Murphy; Nan Knighton
- Book: Jack Murphy; Phoebe Hwang
- Basis: A Nervous Splendor: Vienna 1888-1889 by Frederic Morton Conceived for the stage by Frank Wldhorn and Steve Cuden
- Productions: 2006 Szeged, Hungary; 2006 Budapest, Hungary; 2008 Tokyo; 2009 Vienna, Austria; 2010 Pécs, Hungary; 2012 Tokyo; 2012 Seoul; 2014 Seoul; 2017 Seoul; 2023 Szczecin; 2025 Budapest, Hungary; 2025 Győr, Hungary; 2026 Füssen

Rudolf is a musical conceived for the stage by Frank Wildhorn and Steve Cuden, with a book by Jack Murphy and Phoebe Hwang, lyrics by Murphy, additional lyrics by Nan Knighton, and music by Frank Wildhorn. Arrangements by Koen Schoots and orchestrations by Kim Scharnberg. It is about Rudolf, Crown Prince of Austria and his extramarital relationship with Baroness Mary Vetsera. Their 1889 deaths at his Mayerling hunting lodge apparently were the result of a murder-suicide pact, although historians have debated this explanation.

Loosely based on the book A Nervous Splendor: Vienna 1888-1889 by Frederic Morton, the musical was developed under the working titles Vienna, Affäre Mayerling (The Mayerling Affair), and Rudolf - The Last Kiss. The pressures of the monarchy have fallen upon Rudolf's shoulders, he is in political and personal conflict with his father, Emperor Franz Joseph, and his marriage to Princess Stéphanie of Belgium is crumbling when he meets and falls in love with the 17-year-old baroness. Their secret liaison doesn't escape the attention of prime minister Eduard Taaffe, who hopes to use his knowledge of the affair to destroy Rudolf's political career.

== Plot ==
=== Act I ===
Crown Prince Rudolf of Austria is forced, by his domineering wife Princess Stéphanie of Belgium, to attend a ceremony commemorating forty years of reign by his father, Emperor Franz-Joseph. All the upper class of Austria attend the celebration, in the renovated Hofburg Theatre, and revel in their eccentricity; while the poor lower class citizens riot outside demanding reform. A miserable Rudolf spends the evening drinking and fighting a terrible cold. (“Vorhang auf / Curtain Up”).

Franz-Joseph gives his guests a speech promising a bright future for Austria, before pulling a switch that lights the theatre with electricity for the first time. The guests are then treated to a show starring three female singers in white gowns (“Wiener Schmäh / Viennese Specialties”). Suddenly, a lower-class woman runs up onto the stage and shoots herself in the head, splattering blood all over the performers' dresses. Most of the guests run out in fear, but Rudolf stays and kneels before the body asking, “Why?” Baroness Mary Vetsera steps forward and explains, “It is better to die all at once than to die a little every day.” Rudolf is left contemplating the suffering of his subjects ("Wie jeder andere Mann Prolog / An Ordinary Man").

Franz-Joseph has a meeting with his Minister-President, Count Eduard Taaffe about the “embarrassing” incident and rebellious newspaper articles published by a mysterious revolutionary named, “Julius Felix.” Rudolf interrupts begging his father to listen to his people, but the latter has no intent of doing so. Taaffe vents his suspicions that Julius Felix is an alias for Rudolf's cousin, Archduke Johan Salvator. Franz-Joseph is hesitant to believe Taaffe, but commands him to uncover the truth. Once Taaffe leaves, Rudolf tries to explain to his father that he can no longer ignore the cries of the lower class, but Franz-Joseph again denies Rudolf's pleas. The two men argue over how neither one understands the other (“Du willst nicht hören / You Never Listen”).

The next afternoon, Mary takes a walk with her best friend, Countess Marie Larisch, while reading Julius Felix's latest article (“Wiener Schmäh (reprise) / Viennese Specialties (reprise)”). Mary, a fellow liberal, is enthralled by Felix's words, but Marie thinks he is dangerous. Marie advises Mary to turn her attention instead to saving her poor family from ruin by marrying the wealthy Duke of Bragança, but Mary is not interested. Marie reminds her friend that they have to prepare for a ball Franz-Joseph is hosting that night and goes into detail on how a woman can dress to attract a man (“Ein Hübscher Krieg / Pretty Little War.”) Mary muses on her desire to find someone who shares her ideals (“Mary's Lied / Mary's Song”).

The ball is in honor of the newly crowned German Emperor, Wilhelm II, another of Rudolf's cousins. Still suffering from his cold, Rudolf does not desire to attend, but is again forced to by Stéphanie (“Der Ball / The Ball”). While greeting guests Rudolf again meets Mary, but this time they talk and share a dance. Rudolf surprises Mary with his knowledge of Julius Felix's articles and his understanding of their message (“Marys Walzer / Mary's Waltz”). Stéphanie sees the two together but has grown so used to Rudolf's increasing infidelity that she doesn't stop them. Rudolf expresses his wish to see Mary again before she leaves (“Der Ball (reprise) / The Ball (reprise)”).

After the ball, Rudolf, Wilhelm II and Edward, Prince of Wales, visit a brothel. Wilhelm and Edward both leave with prostitutes, but Rudolf can only think of Mary. Elsewhere, Mary thinks about Rudolf. Neither can fight the feeling that their meeting meant so much more than met the eye (“So viel mehr / Something More.”)

The next day, Taafe meets with Mr. Moriz Szeps, the editor of the newspaper responsible for printing the writings of Julius Felix, and demands he stop printing the articles. Unsure of Szeps’ cooperation, Taafe orders the destruction of the newspaper's editorial office (“Die Strahlende Zukunft / Blue Skies”).

In the destroyed office, Rudolf secretly meets with Szeps and his associates. The men declare that they have written up a new constitution for a free and liberal Europe and try to convince Rudolf to sign the document (“Zeit zu Handeln / Finish What You've Started”). Rudolf is hesitant to sign, not wanting to commit high treason against his father. The men agree to give Rudolf time to make his decision. Once left alone, Rudolf wonders if he can find the strength to go against his father (Wohin führt mein Weg? / How Will I Know?”).

Mary then enters the office, looking to deliver a letter for Julius Felix. Rudolf reads the letter, which states Mary’s desire to meet Felix. Rudolf reveals that he is, in fact, secretly Julius Felix. Mary is shocked, but elated, and the two spend the evening ice-skating (“Tralala / The Tra-La-La Ice Skating Song”).

Rudolf informs Mary that they are being watched by Wiligut, one of Taafe's spies, and suggests that they play a little joke on him. Rudolf and Mary pretend to flirt with each other, teasing Wiligut, but actually begin to fall in love in the process. (“In dem moment als ich dich sah / The Moment I Saw You”). Rudolf tells Mary of the one place where his life is not complicated and he can write the dreams of Julius Felix: Mayerling. Mary asks that Rudolf take her there some day.

Taafe meets with Franz-Joseph to discuss the renewal of Austria's alliance with Germany. When Franz-Joseph asks of Julius Felix, Taafe divulges new intelligence that puts Rudolf under suspicion; but Franz-Joseph does not believe his son could be responsible. Rudolf overhears and fears exposure.

Rudolf wanders the streets aimlessly and is discovered by Mary. When Mary asks what is wrong, Rudolf unhappily replies that, while being with Mary has made him happier than he has ever been, he can no longer see her. Mary affectionately convinces Rudolf to put his fears aside and accept the fact that he loves her. The two share a kiss and begin their affair (“Vertrau in uns / Only Love”).

=== Act II ===
That night, Rudolf suffers a nightmare in which he is tormented and Mary is hanged by a gleeful Taafe and a troupe of masked minions (“Die Fäden in der Hand / The Master of the Strings”).

Rudolf awakens from the nightmare screaming Mary's name. Mary, who has spent the night with Rudolf, rushes to his side. Rudolf is visibly stirred but Mary is able to comfort him back to calmness. As Mary prepares to leave, Rudolf gives her a ring engraved with the phrase, “United in love until death.” Mary sadly insists that she will never be able to wear it, but Rudolf promises her that she will be able to wear it in Mayerling; until then Rudolf has Mary wear the ring on a chain around her neck so that it may be, “the companion of your heart.”

Suddenly Stéphanie enters the bedroom, causing Mary to run out embarrassed. Stéphanie asks Rudolf what makes Mary different from his past affairs. When Rudolf answers that he loves Mary, Stéphanie flies into a rage promising Rudolf that no matter how much he loves Mary he will never be rid of her and she will be crowned and revered as Empress of Austria (“Du bleibst bei mir! / It Will Be Me!”).

Rudolf writes to the Pope, asking that his marriage to Stéphanie be annulled, angering his father. When Franz-Joseph denies the annulment Rudolf threatens to relinquish his title as Crown Prince. Franz-Joseph promises that if Rudolf does so, harm will befall Mary and her family. Franz-Joseph then commands his son to forsake his petition to the Pope and to make no more public appearances. Saddened, Rudolf tells of the torment the burdens of being a prince bring him and expresses his wish to live as an ordinary man (“Wie jeder andere Mann / An Ordinary Man”).

Rudolf returns to the brothel to wallow in a drunken depression. The prostitutes try to seduce Rudolf but he is not in the mood, going so far as to pull out a gun to scare them off (“Wiener Schmäh (reprise) / Viennese Specialties (reprise)”). When a young new customer arrives, all of the prostitutes shift their attention to him, sharing their vast knowledge of lovemaking (“Mein süsser Held / New Boy in Town”).

Mary startles Rudolf by appearing in the brothel dressed like the prostitutes. When Rudolf asks her what she is doing there, a visibly hurt Mary retorts that she had spent two weeks looking for Rudolf and when she found him in the brothel she thought that he favored the prostitutes over her, prompting her transformation. Rudolf swears that the prostitutes mean nothing to him, and tries to make Mary understand that he avoided her for her own safety. Mary affirms that she is willing to take the risk, and asks Rudolf when he will be ready to do the same.

Mary leaves and Rudolf contemplates suicide. However, Rudolf has an epiphany and instead proclaims that he is ready to stand up against his father and fight for the rights of his people (“Mut zur tat / Measure of a Man”).

The following day, Rudolf makes a surprise public appearance at an assembly hosted by Taaffe, who was opening a new Viennese exhibition. Rudolf gives a rousing speech to the masses, promising an innovative future in which all citizens will be treated equally, infuriating Taaffe (“Der Weg in die Zukunft / The Steps of Tomorrow”).

Marie witnesses the speech and fears that while Rudolf may seem victorious at the moment, his doom is closing in (“Die Liebe lenkt / Only Heroes Dare”).

Mary enters a church and runs into Stéphanie. Mary tries to apologize for the affair, but Stéphanie firmly states that while she may always forgive Rudolf she will never forgive Mary. Mary desperately asks Stéphanie why she hates her so much, to which Stéphanie tearfully replies, “Because he loves you so much.” Mary leaves a weeping Stéphanie alone to pray.

Willigut reports to Taaffe that he saw Rudolf and Mary enter a building with Szeps, and that Rudolf remained with Mary long after Szeps had left. Taafe deduces that it is Mary that is giving Rudolf his new-found courage and plots to separate her from the Crown Prince. Taafe summons Mary to his office and offers a large sum of money and a new estate in Milan for her and her family, if she will call off her affair with Rudolf. Mary bluntly refuses and Taafe promises a bitter end for the two lovers (“Wenn das Schicksal dich ereilt / The Writing's on the Wall”).

Rudolf visits Marie and asks her to pass on a letter to Mary insisting that she leave Vienna for her safety; for Rudolf plans to commit high treason by signing Szeps’ constitution. Marie does so, pleading with Mary to fulfill her duty to her family by marrying the Duke of Bragança. Lost in the sorrow of their separation Rudolf and Mary remember their time together, still aching for so much more (“So viel mehr (reprise) / Something More (reprise)”).

Rudolf signs Szeps’ constitution and hands it over to a servant to deliver to Szeps’ associates. However, Rudolf is betrayed and the document is delivered straight into the hands of Taaffe, who in turn hands it over to Franz-Joseph (Zeit zu Handeln (reprise) / Finish What You've Started (reprise)”). The broken Emperor summons his son and convicts him of high treason, stripping Rudolf of his rank and titles before disowning him. Meanwhile, Mary boards a train out of Vienna.

Rudolf runs to the train station, hoping to catch Mary before she leaves, but it appears that he is too late. Rudolf falls to his knees in tears, until he sees Mary approaching. Mary reveals she decided not to leave because she simply could not bear the thought of leaving Rudolf. With all of their hopes and dreams dashed, Rudolf and Mary pronounce each other as the only thing they have left in life (“Du bist meine Welt / I Was Born to Love You”). The two lovers decide that, “It is better to die all at once than to die a little every day,” and form a murder-suicide pact. On January 30, 1889 Rudolf finally takes Mary to Mayerling where, after sharing one last kiss, he shoots and kills her before turning the gun on himself (“Vertrau in uns (reprise) / Only Love (reprise)”).

== Production history ==
Rudolf was given a reading in New York City on December 16, 2005 with Rob Evan as Rudolf, Brandi Burkhardt as Mary, and Michael Shawn Lewis as Taafe. As a co-production of Vereinigte Bühnen Wien, the Budapest Operetta Theater, and the Szeged Open-Air Festival, it had its world premiere in a Hungarian translation at the Operett Színház in Budapest on May 26, 2006, followed by an outdoor staging that opened in Szeged on July 28. Since then, the production has alternated between the two venues, playing in Budapest during the winter months and in Szeged for the summer season.

Rudolf was directed by Miklós Gábor Kerényi and choreographed by Michael Reardon, Éva Duda, Jenő Lőcsei, and László Rogács. Musical Direction by Koen Schoots. Gergely Zöldi translated the book, and the Hungarian lyrics are by Zöldi, MG Kerényi, and Szilárd Somogyi. The original cast included Attila Dolhai as Rudolf, Bernadett Vágó as Mary, Tamás Földes as Taaffe, and Attila Németh as Franz Joseph.

A Vienna production opened at the Raimund Theater on February 26, 2009 directed by David Leveaux and starring Drew Sarich as Rudolf, Lisa Antoni as Mary, and Uwe Kröger as Taaffe. The cast album for this production was released at the beginning of April 2009. A complete professionally shot version of the Vienna production was released on DVD in October 2009. (Formally September 11, 2009). A complete cast album was released in December 2009. The complete cast album contained the changes to the score and the music left unrecorded on the first cast album. The production closed on January 24, 2010.

A second Hungarian production opened on December 10, 2010 in Pécs. The show was directed by Szilárd Somogyi (assistant director of the original Hungarian production), with Zoltán Bókai as musical director and conductor. In the leading roles: Dénes Kocsis/Árpád Zsolt Mészáros as Rudolf, Anna Györfi/Bernadett Vágó as Mary, Ádám Ottlik/Attila Götz as Taaffe, Dávid Pirgel/ András P. Petőcz as Pfeiffer, Veronika Nádasi/Éva Várhelyi as Stephanie and Katalin Stubendek as Larisch. ((As known, the Hungarian musical theatre doesn't work like lead artist/understudy/standby, but both (or all three) casts are equal.)) Major changes showed up in the interpretation of the songs, and in some places the order of the scenes changed drastically. The opening night was a success, and since then the show is on the repertoire of the National Theatre of Pécs.

== Original Hungarian Production Song list ==
Act I

- Viennese Specialties / Ez Bécs!
- Curtain Up / A város ünnepel!
- Mary's Theme / Mária dala
- The Men Who We've Become (You Never Listen) / Mért nem ért meg engem
- An Ordinary Man / Hétköznapi hős
- Prince of Wales' Ball / A walesi herceg bálja
- Something More / Ez most más
- Finish What You've Started / Fejezze be, kérem!
- How Will I Know? / Mondd, mit tegyek?
- Fear And Desire / Kétség és ábránd
- The Tra-La-La Ice Skating Song / Trallalla-dal
- The Moment I Saw You / Kettőnk közt nemrég
- A Better Life / A nemzet hív
- Bird Dog / Nyulak és vérebek
- It's Only Love / Szerelem vár és semmi más ^

Act II

- The Master of the Strings / A mester és a drót
- It Will Be Me! / Nem más, mint én!
- New Boy In Town / Kiskatonám
- Measure Of A Man / Így vagyok csak én
- The Steps of Tomorrow / A holnap hídja
- Only Heroes Dare / Csakis az lesz hős
- Maintain the State / A rend a fõ!
- The Writing's on the Wall / Ez szimpla egyszeregy
- Can I Say Goodbye? / Ez a perc úgy fáj
- A Leaf in the Wind / Akár az őszi levél
- I Was Born to Love You / Te értem születtél
- The Fourth Dimension Ball / A Negyedik dimenzió bálja
- Only Love (reprise) / Szerelem vár és semmi más (repríz)
- Viennese Specialties (reprise) / Ez Bécs! (repríz)

^ English lyrics by Nan Knightnon (Originally from The Scarlet Pimpernel)

== Austrian Production Song List ==
Act I

- Ouverture - orchestra
- Vorhang auf / Curtain Up
- Wiener Schmäh / Viennese Specialties
- Wie jeder andere Mann Prolog / An Ordinary Man (short version)
- Du willst nicht hören / The Men Who We've Become (You Never Listen)
- Wiener Schmäh (reprise) / Viennese Specialties (reprise)
- Ein Hübscher Krieg / Pretty Little War
- Mary's Lied / Mary's Theme (Mary's song)
- Der Ball / The Ball
- Marys Walzer / Mary's Waltz
- Der Ball (reprise) / The Ball (reprise)
- So viel mehr / Something More
- Die Strahlende Zukunft / Blue Skies (short version of "The Steps of Tomorrow")
- Zeit zu Handeln / Finish What You've Started
- Wohin führt mein Weg? / How Will I Know?
- Tralala / The Tra-La-La Ice Skating Song
- In dem moment als ich dich sah / The Moment I Saw You
- Vertrau in uns / Only Love (Trust in us)

Act II

- Die Fäden in der Hand / The Master of the Strings (I hold the strings in my hand)
- Du bleibst bei mir! / It Will Be Me!
- Wie jeder andere Mann / An Ordinary Man (long version) (like any other man)
- Wiener Schmäh (reprise) / Viennese Specialties (reprise)
- Mein süsser Held / New Boy in Town
- Mut zur tat / Measure of a Man
- Der Weg in die Zukunft / The Steps of Tomorrow
- Die Liebe lenkt / Only Heroes Dare
- Die Fuchsfalle / The Bird Dog -
- Wenn das Schicksal dich ereilt / The Writing's on the Wall -
- So viel mehr (reprise) / Something More (reprise)
- Zeit zu Handeln (reprise) / Finish What You've Started (reprise)
- Du bist meine Welt / I Was Born to Love You
- Vertrau in uns (reprise) / Only Love (reprise)(Trust in us - reprise)
