= Camille Claudel (musical) =

- Production poster
- Music: Frank Wildhorn
- Lyrics: Nan Knighton
- Book: Nan Knighton
- Productions: 2003 Goodspeed Musicals; 2004 New York Workshop; 2011 Tokyo

Camille Claudel is a musical with a book and lyrics by Nan Knighton and music by Frank Wildhorn, their second musical. It is based on the life of the real-life French sculptor and graphic artist Camille Claudel. The musical premiered at Goodspeed Musicals in 2003.

== Plot ==
The show's opening scene is in 1913, when Camille was removed from society, then flashes back to 1881 and onward. The plot focuses on Claudel's career and her tempestuous relationship with Auguste Rodin, for whom she was a source of inspiration, a model, a confidante, and a lover. The show opens with Camille's love for her true passion - sculpting ("In the Stone"). The musical features Camille's sometimes troubling relationship with both her father (who had actually helped her) and brother, Paul Claudel. Despite not being a male, she insists she be allowed to be enrolled at Le Salon ("Not a Man"), yet she still manages to work and learn under Rodin. Act 1 concludes with Camille deciding she no longer needs Rodin, and attempts to live and create on her own, only to have Rodin tell her that she would be nothing without him ("Taking Back My Life").

Act II opens with Rodin reflecting on what he has done, and ailing with amiss for Camille ("A Trembling Man"). Camille now spends a lot of time with her father, and the two discuss older times and are at harmony ("Snow Falls"). When Paul realizes Camille's downward spiral into the unknown and her relations with Rodin, he attempts to save her and turn her to God, such as he had had his own conversion ("Field of Angels"). Instead, Camille cannot seem to understand why no one believes in her - including her family ("What's Never Been Done Before"). Rodin eventually rekindles his love with Camille, but the love is never returned ("Learning How to Love You"). After several more years, Camille's family decides that she is no longer stable (both emotionally and financially); they announce that her father has passed days earlier, and she is devastated that they did not tell her. Although she fights with Paul that she is not meant to be there, Paul and her mother send her to an insane asylum, where she comes to peace with the news of her father ("Snow Falls (Reprise)"). At the end of Act II, which switches to modern times, where Camille, now alone, reflects on the life she has lived ("Gold").

== Productions ==
Goodspeed Musicals in staged a "developmental run" in August and September 2003. Directed by Gabriel Barre and choreographed by Mark Dendy, the cast featured Linda Eder in the title role, Michael Nouri as Auguste Rodin, Matt Bogart as Paul Claudel and Milo O'Shea as Camille's father.

The musical was presented in a "chamber-style" form; the cast was minimum, and they attempted to do the most they could with small scale sets. Orchestrations (by Kim Scharnberg) were also on a smaller scale. Instead of bringing in statues, they used dancers to perform, and many of the scenes were strictly dancing for the statues (sometimes accompanied by music). The Waltz was one of these. There were also many book-scenes/moments, more than a common Wildhorn musical. The creators have denounced calling this a "tragedy," but rather a celebration of the life of Camille.

In 2004 it was presented in the form of a 45-minute reading at The National Alliance for Musical Theatre's 16th Annual Festival of New Musicals.

A studio demo recording was made in 2004, with no plans for a release. That demo also included songs recorded in 2001 with Linda Eder as Camille and Guy LeMonnier as Rodin.

The musical had been consistently worked upon, with hopes for productions in Europe and regional theatres across the United States. However, in 2007, author Nan Knighton said that while there were certain opportunities still available, there were no immediate plans to bring Camille anywhere.

The musical opened in Tokyo in December 2011, titled GOLD - Rodin and Camille.

The world premiere of the newly rewritten Camille Claudel was to be presented by the Signature Theatre in Arlington, Virginia from March 24 to April 19, 2020. Directed by Eric D. Schaeffer and choreographed by Mathew Gardiner, the show was to feature Teal Wicks as Camille Claudel, Hugh Panaro as Augustine Rodin, Bobby Smith as M. Claudel, and Donna Migliaccio as Mme. Claudel. However, the world premiere at the Signature Theatre was postponed to the 2020/21 season due to the COVID-19 pandemic.

== Songs ==
The world premiere song list follows. Although several changes have been made, many of the songs remain intact.

Act I

- In the Stone - Camille
- What You Can Grasp In Your Hands - Rodin, Camille, and Girls/Ensemble
- Enough of Paris - The Claudels
- Verge of a Kiss - Rodin
- I'm Home - Camille
- Not a Man - Committee Members/Ensemble and Camille
- A Woman in His Arms - Camille
- Unveiled - Ensemble
- Taking Back My Life - Camille and Rodin

Act II

- A Trembling Man - Rodin
- Snow Falls - Camille and Monsieur Claudel
- Field of Angels - Paul Claudel
- What's Never Been Done Before - Camille
- The Night It Began - Camille and Ensemble
- Learning How to Love You - Camille and Rodin
- Woman in My Arms (Reprise) - Rodin
- If - Camille and Rodin
- Snow Falls (Reprise) - Camille and Monsieur Claudel
- Gold - Camille

== Recordings ==
No cast recordings have been released. In 2004, a studio demo recording was made, starring Linda Eder and the majority of the world premiere cast. While it was originally thought that the recording would be released (nearly all of Wildhorn's musicals have released a concept album prior to a major production), this did not happen.

The musical features the Linda Eder single "Gold," which was included on two of her solo albums: Gold and Broadway, My Way. The song was performed at the 2002 Winter Olympics in Salt Lake City, UT, and was covered by Brandi Burkhardt at several European concerts with Frank Wildhorn.
