= Svengali (musical) =

- Production logo
- Music: Frank Wildhorn
- Lyrics: Gregory Boyd
- Book: Gregory Boyd
- Basis: Trilby by George du Maurier
- Productions: 1991 Houston, Texas; 1991 Sarasota, Florida

Svengali is a musical with a book and lyrics by Gregory Boyd and music by Frank Wildhorn. It is based on the 1894 novel Trilby by George du Maurier.

The title character in this Gothic tale is a vocal coach who uses hypnotism to transform the tone-deaf Trilby into an acclaimed singer and steals her away from Little Billie, a sculptor for whom she has posed. At first the girl can remember nothing about her past, but as her memory slowly returns, she attempts to break free from her possessive mentor.

The musical has been staged twice, both times with Chuck Wagner as Svengali and Linda Eder (Wildhorn's then future, now ex-wife) as Trilby. It premiered at the Alley Theatre in Houston, Texas, in April 1991 and won the Alton Jones Foundation Award for New American Musicals. It was then produced at the Asolo Repertory Theatre in Sarasota, Florida, in October 1991 through November 2, 1991.

The director was Gregory Boyd. The scenic design by Jerome Sirlin used a bank of slide projectors, creating "enigmatic images against the backdrop of the stage: the pensive face of a young woman, gargoyles, a cafe scene, brilliant color fields of red, blue, green and gold." The costumes were by Jane Suttell and lighting by Howell Binkley. The cast featured Philip Hoffman, Molly Scott as Zou Zou.

Of it Wildhorn has said, "It was great working on it and I hope it will have its day."

Although a complete cast album has not been released, several of the show's songs have been recorded. Danny de Munk and Vera Mann dueted on "So Slowly" for his CD Danny, and Eder included "If He Never Said Hello" and "Vole Mon Ange" on her 2003 release Storybook. Eder recorded two more songs from the show, "Slowly" and "I Will Never Be the One", for her album Retro: Volume Two (2020).
