= Carly Robyn Green =

American singer-songwriter

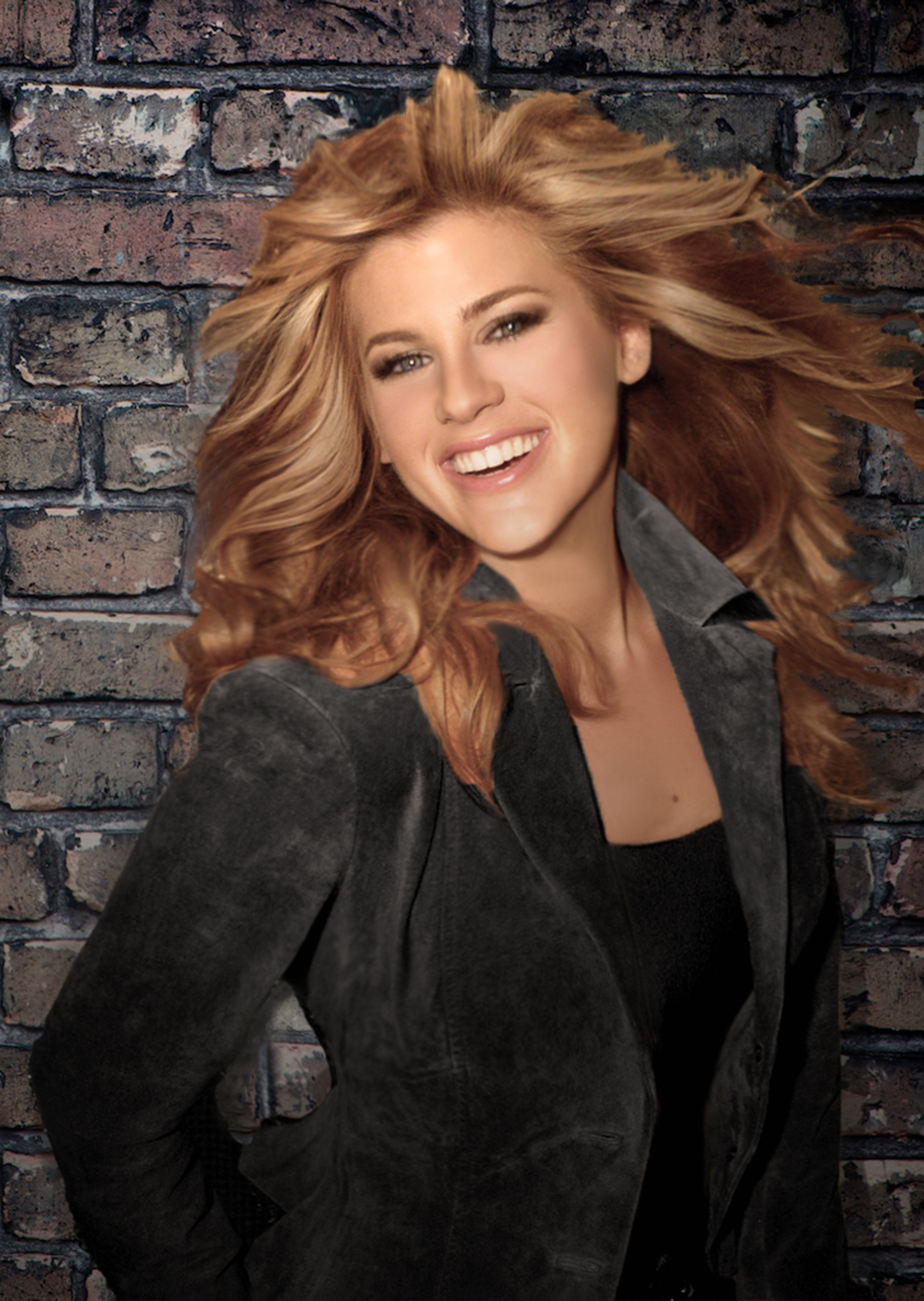

Background information
- Born: Carly Greenberg; Philadelphia, Pennsylvania, U.S.
- Genre: Adult contemporary
- Occupations: Singer, Songwriter, Performer

Carly Robyn Green, born Carly Greenberg, is an American recording artist, songwriter, and musical theatre lyricist originally from Philadelphia, Pennsylvania. Her original musicals have been staged from Tokyo to London's West End. Her original songs have been featured in over 175 television shows and films, and she writes for artists worldwide. Green is signed to BMG.

== Biography ==
As an adult-contemporary / smooth jazz artist and performer, Green has performed at venues including the Staples Center, Madison Square Garden, Wachovia Center, Citizens Bank Park, and the Tropicana Hotel & Casino. Green has performed for MTV’s Rock the Vote, debuted on XM Satellite Radio, been named a MySpace Featured Artist, and signed with BMG as artist and songwriter.

After being told to create trendy “of the moment” music for many years, Green was inspired by CeeLo Green to follow her passion for making classic, timeless music. When she sang with him at the 49th Annual Grammy Awards, he advised Green to just “do what you love.”

As a result of this advice, Green collaborated on her own project of classic love songs with Broadway composer Frank Wildhorn, who penned hits for Whitney Houston and Natalie Cole. Green’s new project of original love songs features her debut single What Love is All About, co-written with Wildhorn.

Green grew up in Philadelphia, Pennsylvania. She graduated magna cum laude from the University of Pennsylvania.

== Musical Theatre ==
In collaboration with Frank Wildhorn and co-lyricist Tracy Miller, Green wrote lyrics for the musical adaptation of the popular Kodancha manga Your Lie in April, which made its world premiere at the Nissay Theatre in Tokyo in May 2022, followed by a tour throughout Japan.

The English language concert stage version of the team's Your Lie in April (musical) is made its European premiere on the West End at the Theatre Royal Drury Lane in April 2024, with an English language book by Rinne Groff and direction by Nick Winston.

Also in collaboration with Wildhorn and Miller, Green wrote English lyrics for the musical adaptation of Osamu Dazai's bestselling novel No Longer Human, which premiered at the Shanghai Grand Theatre in Shanghai in December 2021, followed by a 13 city tour through China.

== Songwriting Credits ==
As a songwriter, Green has written many hits for multi-platinum artists worldwide, including:

- XIA - "My Christmas Wish" - Single - Palm Tree Island
- Harumi - "Dare Me" - "Make a Difference" EP - Sony Music
- Sandra N – “Tu Esti Norocul” – Single – Roton Music
- KARA – “N.E.V.E.R.L.A.N.D.” – “Girl’s Story” Album – Universal Music Japan
- Anri – “Ready to Love” – Single & “Smooth & Groove” Album – IVY Records/Warner Music Japan
- Min Hae – “You & Me” – Single & "You & Me" Album – CJ E&M

She has also written songs for Airspoken, Starmarie, Code V, Miho Fukuhara, Harajuku Theater, Kaho, Aycan, and Roser.

== Television & Film ==
Some of the many TV shows featuring music by Green include: Scandal (ABC), One Life to Live (ABC), Hung (HBO), Young & The Restless (CBS), Real Housewives (BRAVO), Beauty & The Beast (The CW), Keeping Up with the Kardashians (E!), Degrassi (Teen Nick), The Real World (MTV), Say Yes to the Dress (TLC), The Real L Word (Showtime)

Green wrote the Dance Moms hit I'll Be Your Dance Doctor by 21st Century Girl, performed by Mackenzie Ziegler in the Nationals season finale.

Green also wrote the 30 Rock song Crash Your Party, featured in the Martin Luther King Day viral spoof trailer.

TV show theme songs by Green include: I Do Over (WeTV), Pretty Hurts (Logo), The Right Hand (The Movie Network)

Films featuring music by Green include: American Girl: McKenna Shoots for the Stars, Slightly Single in LA, Life Happens, House Bunny, What’s Your Number, A Wish For Christmas, Love on Ice
