= Linda Eder =

American singer and actress

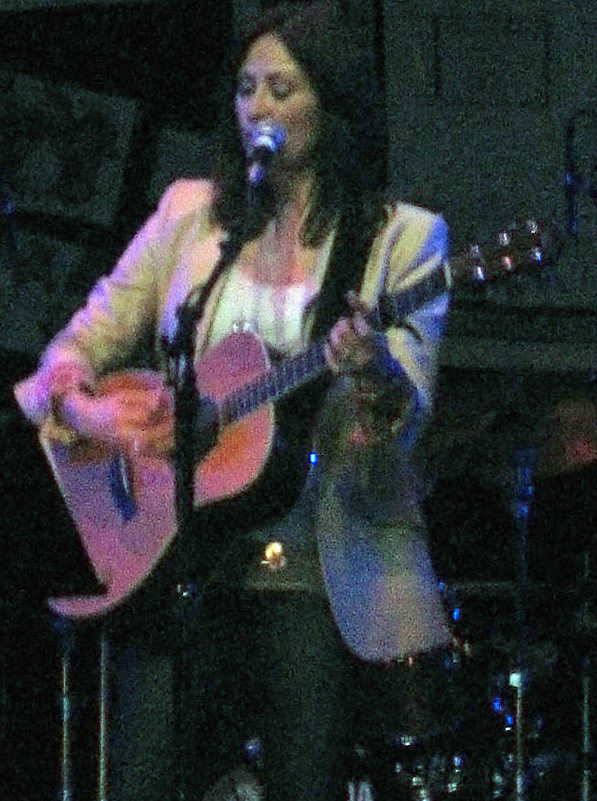
- Eder at the Avalon Hollywood concert
- Born: February 3, 1961 (age 65); Tucson, Arizona, U.S.
- Occupations: Actress, singer
- Spouse: Frank Wildhorn (1998-2004)
- Children: Jake Wildhorn (b. 1999)
- Musical career
- Genres: Pop, showtunes, adult contemporary
- Years active: 1980s–present
- Labels: RCA Victor, Atlantic
- Website: lindaeder.com

Linda Eder (/ˈɛdər/; born February 3, 1961) is an American singer and actress. She originated the role of Lucy Harris in the Broadway musical Jekyll & Hyde, for which she was nominated for the Drama Desk Award.

== Biography ==
Eder was born in Tucson, Arizona, on February 3, 1961, and raised in Garrison, Minnesota. Her parents, Georg (from Austria) and Laila (from Norway), exposed her to music at an early age. She cites Judy Garland, Barbra Streisand, and Eileen Farrell as her childhood inspiration. Eder cites Garland, specifically, as her greatest influence.

Before her work on Broadway, Eder sang in clubs in Minneapolis and performed at Harrah's Casino in Atlantic City, New Jersey. In 1988 she won the talent show Star Search, where her performance caught the notice of Frank Wildhorn. She signed with RCA Records and starred in two 1991 stagings of Wildhorn's musical Svengali (the 1990 world premiere and 1995–96 national tour), the 1997 Broadway production of his Jekyll & Hyde, and the 2003 World Premiere of Camille Claudel. During those years, Eder recorded several CDs on Angel Records and Atlantic Records. Wildhorn and Eder married in 1998 and divorced in 2004; they have one son, Jake. Eder won the Theater World Award (1996–97) for Best Broadway Debut in Jekyll & Hyde.

Since her divorce from Wildhorn, Eder has mainly performed in live concerts at venues including the Greek Theater, Radio City Music Hall, Carnegie Hall, and the Kennedy Center. She has continued to release solo albums, including one recorded live at Skidmore College in 2014, and a 2024 delayed release of TOSOM - The Other Side of Me - Live, recorded during her 2018 touring season of the concert series by the same name.

== Theatre roles ==
Show	Role	Year(s)	Production
Jekyll and Hyde: The Musical	Lucy Harris	1990	Houston (World Premiere)
Svengali	Trilby	1991	Houston (World Premiere)
Svengali	Trilby	1991	Sarasota, Florida
Jekyll and Hyde: The Musical	Lucy Harris	1995-1996	1st US Tour
Jekyll and Hyde: The Musical	Lucy Harris	1997-1998	Broadway
The Civil War	Hanna Hopes	1998	Houston (World Premiere)
The Civil War	Hanna Hopes	1999	Broadway
Camille Claudel	Camille Claudel	2003	Connecticut (World Premiere)

== Discography ==
=== Solo albums ===
- 1989 Vienna (Early UK release of the Linda Eder album)
- 1991 Linda Eder
- 1994 And So Much More
- 1997 It's Time
- 1999 It's No Secret Anymore
- 2000 Christmas Stays the Same
- 2002 Gold
- 2003 Storybook
- 2003 Broadway, My Way
- 2005 By Myself: The Songs of Judy Garland
- 2007 Greatest Hits
- 2008 The Other Side of Me
- 2009 Soundtrack
- 2011 Now
- 2013 Christmas Where You Are
- 2014 Linda Live: The Concert Recording
- 2015 Retro
- 2018 If You See Me
- 2020 Retro-Volume Two
- 2024 TOSOM Live - aka The Other Side of Me - Live in Concert

=== Musical albums ===
- 1990 Jekyll & Hyde: Romantic Highlights (Concept Album) - Lucy Harris & Lisa Carew
- 1992 The Scarlet Pimpernel (Concept Recording) - Marguerite St. Just
- 1995 Jekyll & Hyde: The Complete Work (Concept Album) - Lucy Harris
- 1997 Jekyll & Hyde - The Musical: Original Broadway Cast - Lucy Harris
- 1998 The Scarlet Pimpernel: Encore! (Second Broadway Cast) - Marguerite St. Just ("Only Love", "You Are My Home")
- 1998 The Civil War: An American Musical (Concept Album)
- 1998 The Civil War: The Nashville Sessions
- 2003 Camille Claudel: A New Musical (Studio Demo Recording)* - Camille Claudel
- 2004 Cyrano de Bergerac ~ The Musical (Concept Album)* - Roxanne
- 2005 Peter Pan (Leonard Bernstein) World Premiere Recording of the complete Bernstein score - Wendy
- 2010 Halleluiah Broadway - Herself ("What I Did For Love" (from A Chorus Line), "Electricity" (from Billy Elliot))
- 2011 Tears of Heaven (Concept Album)

*- Although planned, final outcome was that it was not to be released.

=== Singles ===
- "A Little Bit of Heaven"
- "Something To Believe In"
- "Vienna"
- "Never Dance"
- "The Christmas Song"
- "Bells of St. Paul" (Christmas)
- "Gold" (From Camille Claudel)
- "I Am What I Am" (From La Cage Aux Folles)
- "Lifted"
- "The Other Side Of Me"

=== Video albums ===
- 1999 In Concert (Aired on PBS)
- 2001 Christmas Stays The Same (Aired on Bravo)
- 2018 The Other Side: An Inside Look At My Life With Out The Audience

== Awards ==
Awards	Performance	
Theater World Award	Best Broadway Debut, Jekyll & Hyde (1997)	Won
Drama Desk Award	Leading Actress (Lucy), Jekyll & Hyde (1997)	Nominated
Outer Critics Circle	Leading Actress (Lucy), Jekyll & Hyde (1997)	Nominated
