= Hikaru Nara (Goose House song) =

Single by Goose House

from the album Goose House Phrase #10 Milk
- Language: Japanese
- Released: October 23, 2014
- Genre: J-pop; anime song
- Length: 4:14
- Label: Gr8! Records

Goose House singles chronology
"Oto no Naru Houe" (2014)	"Hikaru Nara" (2014)	"Love & Life" (2017)

Alternative cover
- Limited edition cover

Music video
- "Hikaru Nara" (Short ver.) on YouTube

"Hikaru Nara" (Japanese: 光るなら; lit. 'if it shines'; alternatively titled "Goose House Phrase #09 Hikaru Nara") is a song by Japanese pop band Goose House. It was released as a digital single on October 23, 2014 through Gr8! Records, a subsidiary of Sony Music Records, with a physical CD released on November 19. It served as the first opening theme of the Japanese anime series Your Lie in April.

== Background and release ==
On August 9, 2014, Goose House announced they were performing the opening theme for the anime adaptation of the manga series Your Lie in April at their 2014 live tour opening performance, held at Diamond Hall in Nagoya. They commented:

"The light and shadow within the hearts of characters like Kōsei Arima and Kaori Miyazono.

Because it's something everyone experiences, you can't help but root for them as if it were your own story.

Each member read the original manga, and we wanted to capture the emotions we all felt in one song.

It's a new style of music, unlike anything Goose House has done before.

We hope this song will become important to fans of Your Lie in April and to everyone who supports Goose House.

We're all excited to see what kind of world our song will create when combined with the opening animation, and we're looking forward to watching the first episode. We can't wait for it to start!"

— Goose House, Natalie

It was first performed at their 2014 live tour finale on September 15, held at Tokyo International Forum.

The single was released digitally on October 23, while the physical CD single was released on November 19. It came in two versions: a standard edition and a limited edition featuring original cover artwork inspired by the series. The first-press editions of both versions included a random student ID card featuring one of four characters from the anime: Kōsei Arima, Kaori Miyazono, Tsubaki Sawabe, and Ryōta Watari. They also included a postcard for a chance to win a poster signed by the band members.

== Composition ==
"Hikaru Nara" is a J-pop song, composed in the key of F-sharp minor and is set to time signature of common time with a tempo of 160 BPM.

== Track listing ==
All lyrics are written by Goose House.

CD / download / streaming - standard edition
No.	Title	Length
1.	"Hikaru Nara" (光るなら)	4:14
2.	"Huyu no Epilogue" (冬のエピローグ)	5:30
3.	"Hikaru Nara" (Instrumental)	4:12
4.	"Huyu no Epilogue" (Instrumental)	5:02
Total length:		18:58

CD - limited edition
No.	Title	Length
1.	"Hikaru Nara" (光るなら)	4:14
2.	"Huyu no Epilogue" (冬のエピローグ)	5:30
3.	"Hikaru Nara" (TV size)	1:35
4.	"Hikaru Nara" (Instrumental)	4:12
Total length:		15:31

DVD
No.	Title	Length
1.	"Hikaru Nara" (Music video)

== Charts ==
Weekly chart performance for "Hikaru Nara"
Chart (2014)	Peak position
Japan (Japan Hot 100)	5
Japan Hot Animation (Billboard Japan)	1
Japan (Oricon)	11

== Certifications and sales ==
Certifications and sales for "Hikaru Nara"
Region	Certification	Certified units/sales
Japan (RIAJ) Digital	Platinum	250,000^{*}
^{*} Sales figures based on certification alone.
