= Shio Kisui =

Japanese voice actor and singer

- 希水 しお
- Born: March 28, 1998 (age 28); Tokyo Prefecture, Japan
- Occupations: Voice actor; singer; idol (formerly); actress
- Years active: 2014–present
- Agent(s): Oscar Promotion (2014-2017); BLACK SHIP (2021-present, as a voice actress)
- Notable work: The Idolmaster Shiny Colors as Yuika Mitsumine (second voice)
- Height: 156 cm (5 ft 1 in)

Shio Kisui (希水 しお, Kisui Shio; born March 28, 1998), formerly known as Mii Takahashi (高橋 美衣, Takahashi Mii) is a Japanese voice actress and singer from Tokyo Prefecture, Japan. She was a member of the Japanese idol group elfin' from 2015 to 2017.

== Filmography ==
=== Anime ===
- 2014, Concrete Revolutio as Schoolgirl (ep 9)
- 2015, Pikaia! as Mii
- 2016, My Hero Academia as Schoolgirl (ep 3)
- 2017, Pikaia!! as Mii
- 2017, Elegant Yokai Apartment Life as Eriko (ep 11)
- 2022, RPG Real Estate as Dumpling Monster B (ep 5)
- 2022, Shine Post as High School Girl (eps 4, 11)
- 2022, The Masterful Cat Is Depressed Again Today as Female B (ep 3)
- 2023, My Love Story With Yamada-kun at Lv999 as Runa's classmate (ep 6)
- 2024, The Dangers in My Heart (Season 2) as Schoolgirl (ep 12)
- 2024, The Idolmaster Shiny Colors as Yuika Mitsumine
- 2024, Villainess Level 99 as Student (ep 6)
- 2025, BanG Dream! Ave Mujica as customer H

=== Original video animation (OVA) ===
- 2022, The Girl from the Other Side: Siúil, a Rún

=== Anime films ===
- 2014, Pretty Cure All Stars New Stage 3: Eternal Friends as female student
- 2022, Teasing Master Takagi-san: The Movie

=== Video games ===
- 2015, Kemono Friends as Japanese Squirrel, Spotted Hyena, Kamaitachi (Ten)
- 2016, Houkago Girls' Tribe as Miharu Uesugi
- 2016, Vampire†Blood as Yūga Kagaya
- 2017, Aozora Under Girls! as Miyuki Shirabyōshi
- 2021, Kurokishi to Shiro no Maou as Urd
- 2022, Guardian Tales
- 2022, Shirohime Quest as Minakuchi Castle, Kaminoyama Castle
- 2022, The Idolmaster Shiny Colors as Yuika Mitsumine (second voice)
- 2022, The Idolmaster Poplinks as Yuika Mitsumine (second voice)
- 2023, The Idolmaster Shiny Colors: Song for Prism as Yuika Mitsumine
- 2024, Umamusume: Pretty Derby as Daring Heart
- 2024, Touhou LostWord as Rumia (dark monster of the night), Tenkajin Chiyari (charismatic young lady of the modern demon world), Remilia Scarlet, Kawashiro Nitori (who loves to work behind the scenes)
- 2024, Hoshi no Tsubasa as Bertha, Aida
- 2025, OZ Re:write as Trish
- 2025, Chunithm as Yuni

=== Voice dramas ===
- 2016, Cat Situation Voice Drama Series "Big Chibi Walk" Edition
- 2023, Sasayama-san and Tabata-san as Tabata-san

=== Stage shows ===
- 2008, Annie as street child
- 2009, Tokyo Dance Orchestra
- 2011, Leaf Freddy: Journey of Life as Claire, Wind Freddy
- 2019, Les Misérables as ensemble
- 2022, Sasayaki no Hanataba as Sakura's Mother
- 2022, Nagakubo Takakazu no Kiwamete Kowai Hanashi
- 2022, Little Zombie Girl as Maron
- 2025, Your Lie in April as Tsubaki Sawabe
- 2026, Liebe Schuman no Aishita Hito as Clara

=== TV shows ===
- Totto TV

=== Movies ===
- 2008, Kabei: Our Mother as Ritsuko

=== Overseas dubbing ===
- Descendants as female student
- Morden i Sandhamn as Lina Lucien
- Uncle Grandpa as girl

=== TV Shows ===
- Totto TV (NHK)
- JOYNT POPS

== Discography ==
=== Character Songs ===
| Release date | Title | Artist | Track listing |
2018
| August 29, 2018 | STAR☆TING! | Aozora Under Girls | STAR☆TING! Orange |
| August 29, 2018 | STAR☆TING! | GE:NESiS | Karisome Irony; Ibaranomichi ~Kioku no Hate~; Beyond the Tears |
2022
| April 13, 2022 | THE IDOLM@STER SHINY COLORS PANOR@MA WING 01 | Shiny Colors | Niji no Yukue; Daybreak Age |
| April 23, 2022 | THE IDOLM@STER SHINY COLORS Synthe-Side 01 | L'Antica, Straylight | Killer×Mission |
| April 23, 2022 | THE IDOLM@STER SHINY COLORS Synthe-Side 01 | Yuika Mitsumine (Shio Kisui) | Killer×Mission |
| April 13, 2022 | THE IDOLM@STER SHINY COLORS PANOR@MA WING 03 | L'Antica | Fudōsei Innocence; Gusha no Dokuhaku; Niji no Yukue |
