= Frank Wildhorn =

American composer (born 1958)

- Born: November 29, 1958 (age 67); New York City, New York, United States
- Occupations: Composer, songwriter, playwright
- Years active: 1977–present

Frank Wildhorn (born November 29, 1958) is an American composer of both musicals and popular songs. His musical Jekyll & Hyde ran for four years on Broadway. He also wrote the hit song "Where Do Broken Hearts Go" for Whitney Houston.

== Early years ==
Wildhorn was born in Harlem and spent his childhood in Queens before moving to Hollywood, Florida, at age 14. Soon after he taught himself how to play the piano, Wildhorn realized he wanted to compose music. During high school, he played in and wrote for various bands, ranging from rock and roll to rhythm and blues to jazz. He attended Miami-Dade College for two years before transferring to the University of Southern California, where he studied history and philosophy. He started writing Jekyll & Hyde with Steve Cuden, who was working at USC when Frank was a student. He is Jewish.

== Career ==
=== Popular music ===
In the popular music arena, Wildhorn has worked with such artists as Stacy Lattisaw, Natalie Cole, Kenny Rogers, Trisha Yearwood, Tracy Lawrence, Trace Adkins, Patti LaBelle, Dennis DeYoung, and Linda Eder, to whom he was married. His "Where Do Broken Hearts Go" was an international number one hit for Whitney Houston in 1988. Wildhorn is Creative Director of Atlantic Theatre, an Atlantic Records division that develops new American musicals. In 2005, he co-founded GlobalVision Records with long-time collaborator Jeremy Roberts. GlobalVision releases include a new concept recording of Dracula, the Musical and a new studio recording of Jekyll & Hyde: Resurrection.

=== Stage ===
In 1999, Wildhorn had three shows running simultaneously on Broadway: Jekyll & Hyde at the Plymouth Theatre, The Scarlet Pimpernel at the Minskoff Theatre, and The Civil War at the St. James Theatre; however, all three shows closed without making a profit, for a total loss approaching $20 million. In 2004, he collaborated with Don Black and Christopher Hampton on a musical based on Dracula.

Wildhorn has become a prominent composer globally, with many productions in Europe and Asia having long runs. Jekyll & Hyde is one of the longest running musicals of all time in South Korea. The musical Carmen, with music by Wildhorn and lyrics by Jack Murphy, premiered in Prague in October 2008. The musical Count of Monte Cristo, music by Wildhorn with book and lyrics by Jack Murphy, received a workshop reading in November 2008, and opened at the Theatre of St. Gallen, Switzerland in March 2009. Another musical, with music by Wildhorn and lyrics by Don Black, Bonnie and Clyde, received an industry reading in February 2009 and premiered at the La Jolla Playhouse in California in November 2009. Also in November 2009, another new musical, Wonderland: Alice's New Musical Adventure premiered at the David A. Straz, Jr. Center for the Performing Art in Tampa, Florida, with another production following at the Alley Theatre, Houston, Texas, in January 2010.

Wildhorn is also the first Broadway musician to work with the Takarazuka Revue on the Cosmos Troupe's production of the musical Never Say Goodbye.

Other musicals include Camille Claudel, which ran in 2003 at the Goodspeed Opera House and a short developmental run at the NYMT Festival in 2004, and Waiting for the Moon starring Lauren Kennedy and Jarrod Emmick in New Jersey in 2005, with the musical being renamed Zelda for a run at Flatrock Playhouse in 2012. In 2015, Wildhorn created a musical based on the popular Japanese manga series Death Note (this would lead to more manga adaptations, such as Fist of the North Star in 2021 and Your Lie In April in 2022). In 2018, he debuted The Man Who Laughs in South Korea, based on Victor Hugo's novel. The Man Who Laughs won three awards at the 2019 Korean Musical Awards, including Best Musical.

=== Other compositions ===
Wildhorn composed a full-length commissioned symphonic piece, Danube Symphony, which was recorded by the 96-piece Vienna Symphony. A CD of the work was released on December 10, 2021. The premiere took place on 3rd November 2022 in Wiener Musikverein.

== Personal life ==
Wildhorn married Linda Eder on May 3, 1998. They have a son, and he has another son from an earlier marriage. He and Eder divorced in 2004.

Wildhorn was engaged to Brandi Burkhardt, best known for playing the role of Crickett on Hart of Dixie. He also wrote the roles of Alice in Wonderland and Bonnie in Bonnie & Clyde for her. They separated in late 2010.

In 2014, he announced his engagement to Yoka Wao, a former Takarazuka male-role top star who played the lead role in Never Say Goodbye and the Japanese production of Dracula. They were married on July 26, 2015, in Maui, Hawaii.

== Works ==
- Jekyll & Hyde (1990) – Broke Plymouth Theater Record For Most Performances; World Premiere: Alley Theatre, May 1990. (Pre-B'way National Tour 1995–6; Broadway 1997–2001; Tour: 1999–2003; Tour: 2012–2013; Broadway revival: 2013)
- Svengali (1991) – World Premiere: Alley Theatre, April 1991. (Houston, TX & Sarasota, FL)
- Two songs in Victor/Victoria (1995) – World Premiere: (Minneapolis, MN)
- The Scarlet Pimpernel (1997) – World Premiere: Minskoff Theatre (Broadway), October 1997. Drama Desk Nomination for Outstanding Music (Broadway: 1997–2000 (split run(s)), Tour: 2000–2002)
- The Civil War (1998) – World Premiere: Alley Theatre, September 1998. Tony Nomination for Best Original Score and Drama Desk Nomination for Outstanding Music (Broadway: 1999, Tour: 1999–2000)
- Dracula, the Musical (2001) – World Premiere: La Jolla Playhouse, October 2001. (Also: Broadway 2004, St. Gallen 2005, Graz 2007)
- Camille Claudel (2003) – World Premiere: Norma Terris Theatre/Goodspeed Theatre, August 2003. (Goodspeed CT: 2003; NYMF: 2004)
- Waiting for the Moon (2005) – lyrics by: Jack Murphy – World Premiere: Lenape Performing Arts Center, July 2005. Revived in 2012 as Zelda – An American Love Story at the Flat Rock Playhouse, then as Scott & Zelda in 2015 at Tokyo, Japan.
- Rudolf – The Last Kiss (2006) – World Premiere: Budapest Operetta Theater, May 2006.
- Never Say Goodbye (2006) – World Premiere: Takarazuka Grand Theater, March 2006.
- Carmen (2008) – lyrics by: Jack Murphy; Premiere in Prague, Czech Republic.
- The Count of Monte Cristo (2009) – lyrics by: Jack Murphy – World Premiere: Theater St. Gallen, March 2009.
- Cyrano de Bergerac (2009) World Premiere: Japan, May 2009
- Bonnie & Clyde (2009) – lyrics by Don Black; World Premiere: La Jolla Playhouse, November 2009.
- Wonderland (2009) – World Premiere: The David A. Straz Jr. Center for the Performing Arts, December 2009; Alley Theatre 2010; Broadway 2011; Japan 2012; UK National Tour 2017)
- Tears of Heaven (2011) – lyrics by Robin Lerner; opened in Seoul, South Korea.
- Mitsuko (2011) – written with Jack Murphy and Shuichiro Koike as a musical concert, Vienna in 2005; Tokyo and Osaka, Japan in 2011.
- Excalibur (2014) – lyrics by Robin Lerner – World Premiere: Theater St. Gallen, March 2014.
- Death Note: The Musical (2015) – lyrics by Jack Murphy, Japan and South Korea.
- Mata Hari (2016) - lyrics by Jack Murphy, South Korea and Japan.
- The Passage to the Light - The Revolutionary Maximilien Robespierre (2017) - World Premiere: Takarazuka Grand Theater, November 2017
- The Man Who Laughs (2018) - lyrics by Jack Murphy, Art Hall Opera Theater, Seoul, July 10.
- Fist of the North Star (2021) - World Premiere: Nissay Theatre, Tokyo, December 8, 2021
- No Longer Human (2021) - lyrics by Tracy Miller and Carly Robyn Green - World Premiere: Shanghai Grand Theatre, Shanghai, December 10, 2021
- Your Lie in April (2022) - lyrics by Tracy Miller and Carly Robyn Green - World Premiere: Nissay Theatre, Tokyo, May 7, 2022
- Peter I (2022) - World Premiere: Theatre of Musical comedy, Saint-Petersburg, December 2, 2022
- Kane and Abel (2025) - World Premiere: Tokyu Theatre Orb, Tokyo, Japan, January 2025
- Einstein - A Matter of Time (2025) - lyrics by Frank Ramond, Book by Gil Mehmert - World Premiere: Theater St. Gallen, March 1, 2025
- Beau Brummell: The Man Who Was Too Beautiful (2025) - Written and directed by Ikuta Hirokazu - World Premiere: Hyogo Prefecture Takarazuka Grand Theater, Hyogo, Japan, November 1, 2025
- The Song of Bernadette - lyrics by Robin Lerner & book by Rinne Groff, In Development
- Reunion - Book and lyrics by Rinne Groff, In Development
- Van Gogh in Love - Book and lyrics by Rinne Groff, In Development
- Chimney Town - In Development
- Mac & Beth -lyrics by Tracy Miller and Carly Robyn Green, In Development
- Orlando - In Development

== Cast recordings ==
Wildhorn produced and composed a majority of Linda Eder's solo albums and is widely recognized for his ability to release a score before the show opens and have it sell really well. Below are the major concept and cast recordings he has made over his career that have been released in the United States.

- Jekyll & Hyde
  - Jekyll & Hyde – Romantic Highlights (1990); Linda Eder and Colm Wilkinson
  - Jekyll & Hyde – The Gothic Musical Thriller: The Complete Work (Note: Grammy Nominated) (1995); Linda Eder, Anthony Warlow and Carolee Carmello
  - Jekyll & Hyde – The Musical: Original Broadway Cast Recording (1997); Linda Eder, Robert Cuccioli and Christiane Noll
  - Jekyll & Hyde – Resurrection (2006); Rob Evan, Kate Shindle and Brandi Burkhardt
  - Jekyll & Hyde – New Concept Recording (2012) – Constantine Maroulis, Deborah Cox, Teal Wicks, Corey Brunish
- The Scarlet Pimpernel – A New Musical (1992); Linda Eder, Chuck Wagner, and Dave Clemmons
- The Scarlet Pimpernel: Broadway's New Musical Adventure (1998); Douglas Sills, Christine Andreas and Terrence Mann
- The Civil War – Concept Album (1998); Hootie and the Blowfish, Maya Angelou, Trisha Yearwood, Linda Eder, Betty Buckley, Michael Lanning, etc.
- The Civil War – The Nashville Sessions (1998); Blend of Celebrities
- The Scarlet Pimpernel – Encore! (1999); Douglas Sills, Christine Andreas, Terrence Mann, Linda Eder, Rex Smith and Rachel York
- Dracula, das Musical (2008); Lyn Liechty, Uwe Kroger and Thomas Borchert
- Count of Monte Cristo – The Musical (Highlights) (Note: Certified Platinum) (2009); Brandi Burkhardt and Thomas Borchert
- Wonderland: Alice's New Musical Adventure – The Concept Album (2008); Brandi Burkhardt, Andy Señor, Cheryl Freeman and Tracy Miller
- Tears of Heaven (2011); Linda Eder, Christiane Noll, James Barbour, Rob Evan, Jackie Burns, Morgan James
- Wonderland: Alice Through A Whole New Looking Glass – Original Broadway Cast Recording (2011) – Janet Dacal, Darren Ritchie, Kate Shindle
- Dracula, The Musical – New Concept Album (2011); James Stacy Barbour, Lauren Kennedy, Norm Lewis and Kate Shindle (under Global Vision Records)
- Bonnie & Clyde – Original Broadway Cast Recording (2012) – Jeremy Jordan, Laura Osnes

The following concept albums were announced, but were never released.

- Cyrano de Bergerac – The Musical (2006); Douglas Sills, Rob Evan and Linda Eder
- Death Note: The Musical (2014) – Jeremy Jordan, Jarrod Spector, Eric Anderson, Carrie Manolakos, Adrienne Warren, Michael Lanning, and Laura Osnes (a Japanese cast recording was released in 2016)

== Other songs ==
- Miracles - Stacy Lattisaw, lead single from Sixteen (album)
- Love Me Like The First Time - Brenda K. Starr, second single from I Want Your Love (album)
- Don't Look in My Eyes - Kenny Rogers, from The Heart of the Matter (Kenny Rogers album)
- Where Do Broken Hearts Go - Whitney Houston, fourth single and Billboard Hot 100 #1 hit from Whitney (album)
- I Do - Natalie Cole and Freddie Jackson, from Good to Be Back
- Vienna - Linda Eder, from Linda Eder
- You Are My Home - Linda Eder and Peabo Bryson, from The Scarlet Pimpernel
- What I Do Best - Robin S., third single from Show Me Love (album)
- Someone - Linda Eder and Michael Feinstein, from And So Much More
- So Slowly - Danny de Munk, from Danny (originally from the musical Svengali)
- My Father's Eyes - Philip Quast, from Live at the Donmar
- This Time Around - David Hasselhoff, from This Time Around
- I Was Born to Love You - David Hasselhoff and Brandi Burkhardt, from This Time Around
- Freedom - Sabrina Weckerlin, from I'm Not Done Yet

== Award nominations ==
Year	Award Ceremony	Category	Nominated Work	Result
1998	Grammy Award	Best Musical Theatre Album	Jekyll & Hyde: Original Broadway Cast Recording	Nominated
1998	Drama Desk Award	Outstanding Music	The Scarlet Pimpernel	Nominated
1999	Tony Award	Best Original Score	The Civil War	Nominated
1999	Drama Desk Award	Outstanding Music	The Civil War	Nominated
2012	Tony Award	Best Original Score	Bonnie & Clyde	Nominated
2012	Drama Desk Award	Outstanding Music	Bonnie & Clyde	Nominated
2012	Outer Critics Circle Award	Outstanding Score	Bonnie & Clyde	Nominated

Additionally, Wildhorn's musicals The Civil War and The Scarlet Pimpernel were nominated for Best Musical at the Tony Awards, and The Civil War and Bonnie & Clyde earned Drama Desk nominations for Outstanding Broadway Musical. Jekyll & Hyde, The Scarlet Pimpernel, The Civil War, and Bonnie & Clyde also received nominations for Outstanding Musical by the Outer Critics Circle.
