= Nick Winston =

English director and choreographer

Nick Winston is an English director and choreographer working in theatre, opera and film.

== Life and career ==
Winston directed Bonnie & Clyde in Concert at the Theatre Royal, Drury Lane, starring Jeremy Jordan, followed by Bonnie & Clyde at The Arts Theatre in 2022 and a subsequent production at the Garrick Theatre in 2023. His second collaboration with composer Frank Wildhorn was Death Note, which had a concert premiere at the London Palladium in September 2023, followed by a run at the Lyric Theatre.

His previous credits as director and choreographer include The Secret Garden (London Palladium, 2022); Chess (Drury Lane, 2022); Shrek the Musical (Eventim Apollo; UK Tour, 2023); Fame (Peacock Theatre; Troubadour; UK tour, 2019); Mame (Hope Mill Theatre, 2019); Rock of Ages (UK tour, 2018 and 2021); Club Tropicana (UK tour, 2019); The Wedding Singer (Troubadour, 2020; UK tour, 2017); We Will Rock You (world tour, 2022); Buddy: The Buddy Holly Story (Artscape, Cape Town, 2023); An American in Paris (National Theatre, Linz, 2018); Chess (Tokyo, 2020); Guys and Dolls; Carousel (2022); Half a Sixpence (2022); Cats (Kilworth House, 2019); Bugsy Malone and Shakespeare's A Midsummer Night's Dream (Curve, 2017).

Winston's work as choreographer includes Pippin at the Charing Cross Theatre (2021), Annie at the Piccadilly Theatre (2017); the original West End production of Loserville (2012) in West Yorkshire Playhouse, Leeds, and then at the Garrick, which received an Olivier Award nomination for Best New Musical; Druids’ production of Waiting for Godot, which toured America and played a season at the Lincoln Center in New York; Kiss Me Kate at the Théâtre du Châtelet in Paris and Jonathan Dove's The Adventures of Pinocchio for Opera North at Grand Theatre, Leeds (2010) and other opera companies.

Winston directed a 2022 film adaptation of his own musical, Tomorrow Morning (Amazon). He directed The Royal Variety Show in the presence of HRH The Prince of Wales, hosted by Miranda Hart for ITV in 2017. His other work on screen includes Miranda: My Such Fun Celebration (BBC, 2019); Sondheim at 80 starring Judi Dench (BBC), Shakespeare Live: From the RSC (BBC) and The Diplomat (Netflix).

Winston directed the original production of Burlesque the Musical at Manchester Opera House in June and Glasgow in September 2024.

Winston lives in Northampton with his two children.
