= Schenectady Light Opera Company =

New York Community Theater

Schenectady Light Opera Company (SLOC Musical Theater) is a nonprofit community theater organization in Schenectady, New York, established in 1926. The current location of the theater is at the new performance art center at 427 Franklin Street, in downtown Schenectady. The company has presented over 200 shows at various locations for over 90 years. The company presents amateur theater productions.

== History of the company ==
The Schenectady Light Opera Company (SLOC) was born in 1926 when a group of Van Corlaer and Draper alumni joined to "present short plays containing songs and comedy acts." The group, directed by Mrs. Etta Moore, a music teacher in the Schenectady City School District, was known as the Bellevue Young People's Chorus. The group first presented concerts and short operettas before moving on to the Gilbert and Sullivan shows, Trial by Jury and Patience, in 1933–1934. In 1936 the Bellevue Young People's Chorus changed its name to Schenectady Light Opera Company.

In the spring of 1942 the Company disbanded for the duration of the war, due to the shortage of male members. In 1946 the group got together again and presented H.M.S. Pinafore at Mont Pleasant High School, the company's adopted home. The manpower situation still posed a problem. A note in the group's newsletter stated, "To maintain the balance of the parts, no new sopranos will be admitted unless they bring a male."

Another problem was storage. The company had accumulated vast quantities of costumes and sets, so a search was begun for a building SLOC could call "home." The old Craig School on Balltown Road seemed ideal; however, the zoning laws, made it necessary to petition the State Supreme Court in order to allow a membership corporation to own property. That was successful, and henceforth, Craig School was to be known as the Opera House.

Until 1950, productions were given at Mont Pleasant High School, with the exception of "road" shows to Cobleskill, Schoharie and East Greenbush. In November 1950, SLOC presented The Mikado, in the Erie Theater. "Move-in" became a SLOC tradition at the Erie. Friday night the sets were loaded at the Opera House and moved into the Erie after the late movie. Showboat was the last SLOC show at the Erie before it closed in 1956.

Burnt Hills High School hosted The Merry Widow in 1957, and Finian's Rainbow became the first SLOC show in the new Niskayuna High School. In 1959, SLOC first ventured into modern opera with presentations of The Telephone, Down in the Valley and RSVP. SLOC later produced The Medium and Amelia Goes to the Ball.

Although the theater continued to produce Gilbert and Sullivan in the 1950s, the productions of Brigadoon, Carousel, Showboat and Oklahoma! marked the transition from operetta to truly American musical theater.

The 1960s produced SLOC's first attempts at modern musical comedy- The Music Man, Where's Charley?, Guys and Dolls, and Bye Bye Birdie -as well as the classics, The King and I, My Fair Lady, Kiss Me Kate, and South Pacific. The decade closed with the beautiful She Loves Me, and the exciting West Side Story. The 1970s opened with the comedy A Funny Thing Happened on the Way to the Forum, and the operas Amahl and the Night Visitors and Help, Help, the Globolinks! The 1970s also brought productions of the popular Mame, Hello Dolly!, Annie Get Your Gun; Fiddler on the Roof and Gypsy.

In 1971 SLOC sold the "Opera House" on Balltown Road and purchased the Beth Israel Synagogue at 826 State Street, Schenectady. Thus began the huge task of turning the building into a theater. In 1972 the new Opera House officially opened with Jacques Brel. This was the beginning of the cabaret shows with table seating and wine, bread and cheese. The SLOC season now included two shows at the Opera House, two shows at Niskayuna High School, as well as concerts, revues and workshops.

In 1973, SLOC moved its set-building operation to a gym directly behind the Opera House. In 1974 SLOC made an early contribution to the nation's Bicentennial with a production of 1776. The company's George M! was also a tribute to the U.S. to help celebrate its 50th anniversary. In 1976-1977 SLOC was still performing four shows: two at Niskayuna High School and two at the Opera House. During 1977-1978 SLOC purchased a nearby State Street building to use as its costume house.

In April 1980 SLOC moved from, Niskayuna High School to Proctor's Theater, with Shenandoah, and continued its four-show season (two at the Opera house and two at Proctor's) until 1990 when SLOC did The Most Happy Fella at Proctor's Theater. In 1987 SLOC purchased a small building on Taurus Road in Niskayuna to use as its set-building facility. We no longer had to keep moving all our sets to rental venues.

In the fall of 1990 SLOC performed one more show at Niskayuna High School and then began performing only at the Opera House until presenting its 70th anniversary celebration in 1996 with a birthday bash at Proctor's.

In April 2010, SLOC purchased several buildings from the Albany Catholic Diocese that were St John the Baptist, between Franklin and Liberty Streets in Schenectady. This was a major undertaking in order to have sufficient space for performing, rehearsal, storage of costumes and equipment, on-site office and meeting needs, live-in property manager, rentals, plus parking and future additions for set construction and storage. It also is much nicer for audiences, production teams and other volunteers, since it is handicapped accessible, has convenient parking, restaurants within walking distance and is in Schenectady's developing arts district.

After SLOC purchased its new home, the Northeast Ballet Company also needed a new home and moved in as a lease tenant in October 2010. This fit the vision SLOC's Board and members had of creating a small performing arts complex for local groups. NEB has expanded their lease space as they have grown in the SLOC performing arts complex.

The opening production in February 2011 in the new theater complex was The Drowsy Chaperone, which played to packed houses. Many reviewers have written that the quality of SLOC's productions achieved a higher level since being in the new theater.

Since opening at its new theater, SLOC has presented acclaimed and award-winning productions including: The Drowsy Chaperone, Les Misérables (Youth Production), Hairspray, Fiddler on the Roof, Dirty Rotten Scoundrels, Guys and Dolls, Caroline, or Change, The 25th Annual Putnam County Spelling Bee (directed by a high school student), and Young Frankenstein. SLOC has expanded its resources to offer youth the opportunity to develop their performing, technical and artistic skills with productions and workshops.

In March of 2020, the SLOC Board of Directors made the decision to close down the theater buildings and subsequently, the production of A Funny Thing Happened on the Way to the Forum that was due to open that week, in light of the COVID-19 pandemic. The theater did not produce another show until September of 2021 with Ordinary Days. During the shut-down, they were able to maintain the campus and reopen their doors due to the generosity of donors and their volunteers. The theater provided digital content in the form of workshops, panel discussions, informational videos and fundraisers during that year, which can still be found on their website.

SLOC's future plans are to improve the facilities with a new lobby and a set construction and storage facility. The SLOC Board of Directors has developed a new strategic plan, which provides guidance for operational improvements to strive for success internally as well as for its customers.

== High school awards program ==
SLOC holds an annual High School Awards program in which a committee of SLOC board members observe high school shows, then later in the year awards excellent performers and the top three high school musicals in the Capital District.

== Current board of directors (2023–2024) ==
- President- Thomas Coon
- Vice-president - John Meglino
- Treasurer - Mark Viscusi
- Secretary - Adrienne Sherman

Board Members:

- Rose Biggerstaff
- Amy Clark
- Thomas Coon
- Heather-Liz Copps
- Matthew Dembling
- Jeffrey P. Hocking
- Thearse McCalmon
- John Meglino
- Debbie Paniccia
- Emily Rose Rivera
- Elizabeth Sherwood-Mack
- Michaela Torres

== Current season (2023–2024) ==
- Matilda: The Musical - September 15, 2023 - September 24, 2023
- Tarzan: The Musical (youth production) - November 3, 2023 - November 12, 2023
- Spring Awakening - January 19, 2024 - January 28, 2024
- Fun Home - March 15, 2024 - March 24, 2024
- Joseph and the Amazing Technicolor Dreamcoat - May 3, 2024 - May 12, 2024

== Past productions ==
=== 2020s ===
- 2022-2023 Once , First Date , A Little Night Music , The Wedding Singer , It Shoulda Been You , The Complete Works of William Shakespeare (abridged)
- 2021-2022 Ordinary Days, The Glorious Ones, Songs For a New World, Merrily We Roll Along, Violet

=== 2010s ===
- 2019-2020 The Addams Family, Mary Poppins, 9 to 5 (musical)
- 2018-2019 In the Heights, Grease (musical), The Wild Party, 1776, 42nd Street
- 2017-2018 Cabaret, West Side Story, Jesus Christ Superstar, Curtains, Sister Act
- 2016-2017 Annie Get Your Gun, Footloose, Urinetown: The Musical, Into the Woods, How to Succeed in Business Without Really Trying
- 2015-2016 Legally Blonde, Beauty and the Beast, Sweeney Todd, Hair, The Producers
- 2014-2015 The Rocky Horror Show, Shrek the Musical, South Pacific, Smokey Joe's Cafe, Spamalot
- 2013-2014 Guys and Dolls, You're a Good Man, Charlie Brown, Caroline, or Change, The 25th Annual Putnam County Spelling Bee, Young Frankenstein
- 2012-2013 Next to Normal, Little Shop of Horrors, Dirty Rotten Scoundrels, The Sound of Music, Sweet Charity, High School Musical on Stage!
- 2011-2012 Ragtime, Aida, Baby, Fiddler on the Roof, Hairspray
- 2010-2011 Pirates of Penzance, Nunsense, The Drowsy Chaperone, Les Misérables, Carousel
- 2009-2010 The Pajama Game, Joseph and the Amazing Technicolor Dreamcoat, Side by Side by Sondheim, Kiss Me, Kate, 13

=== 2000s ===
- 2008-2009 Thoroughly Modern Millie, Seussical, Jacques Brel is Alive and Well and Living in Paris, Assassins, The Scarlet Pimpernel
- 2007-2008 Kiss of the Spider Woman, The Music Man, Annie, Beguiled Again, Bat Boy: The Musical, Anything Goes
- 2006-2007 The Full Monty, Once on this Island, Hello, Dolly!
- 2005-2006 Songs for a New World, Nuncrackers, Sullivan and Gilbert, Nine, Oliver!
- 2004-2005 Jekyll & Hyde, Gypsy: A Musical Fable, Triumph of Love, Grease
- 2003-2004 Jane Eyre, Babes in Arms, The Mystery of Edwin Drood, Victor/Victoria
- 2002-2003 Company, A Funny Thing Happened on the Way to the Forum, Zombie Prom, City of Angels
- 2001-2002 Camelot, The Melody Lingers On, Ruthless!, Damn Yankees
- 2000-2001 Tommy, Little Me, And the World Goes 'Round, Big River
- 1999-2000 Shenandoah, Meet Me in St. Louis, The Robber Bridegroom, Follies,

=== 1990s ===
- 1999 Mack & Mabel, Forever Plaid,
- 1998 Sweeney Todd: The Demon Barber of Fleet Street, On the Twentieth Century, The Mikado,Blood Brothers
- 1997Guys and Dolls, Evita, She Loves Me, Me and My Girl
- 1996 Magic Of Cabaret, Godspell, Secret Garden, 70th Birthday Bash, They're Playing Our Song
- 1995 Nunsense, Falsettos, Into the Woods, A Chorus Line
- 1994 Man of La Mancha, Galaxy Shining Stars Benefit Concert, How to Succeed in Business Without Really Trying, Jesus Christ Superstar, A Little Night Music
- 1993 Jerry's Girls, You're a Good Man, Charlie Brown, Anne of Green Gables – The Musical, Dames at Sea
- 1992 Tied To The Tracks, The Pirates of Penzance, Cabaret, Fiorello!, The Rothschilds
- 1991 Baby, The Best Little Whorehouse in Texas, Chicago, Joseph and the Amazing Technicolor Dreamcoat
- 1990 Little Shop of Horrors, The Most Happy Fella, Sing For Your Supper, Annie

=== 1980s ===
- 1989 The Gondoliers, 1776, Lies & Legends, Harry Chapin, Mame
- 1988 Once Upon a Mattress, Barnum, Jacques Brel is Alive and Well and Living in Paris, Li'l Abner, Cinderella
- 1987 A Funny Thing Happened on the Way to the Forum, Fiddler on the Roof, 60th Anniversary Concert, The Sound of Music
- 1986 Little Mary Sunshine, Kiss Me, Kate, H.M.S. Pinafore, Peter Pan
- 1985 Starting Here, Starting Now, My Fair Lady, They're Playing Our Song, The Wizard of Oz
- 1984 The 1940's Radio Hour, Hello, Dolly!, Hänsel and Gretel, Annie
- 1983 I Love My Wife, The Music Man, Who Said What #2, Pippin
- 1982 Applause, Oklahoma!, Sweet Charity, Oliver!
- 1981 Candide, The King and I, The Boy Friend, Grease
- 1980 Bells Are Ringing, Shenandoah, The Robber Bridegroom, Half A Sixpence

=== 1970s ===
- 1979 On a Clear Day You Can See Forever, Anything Goes, Carousel
- 1978 The Apple Tree, A Little Night Music, Godspell, Guys and Dolls
- 1977 Promises, Promises, Carnival!, Curley McDimple
- 1976 10 Nights in a Bar Room, George M!, Godspell, 50th Anniversary Concert, Man of La Mancha
- 1975 Damn Yankees, Funny Girl, Once Upon a Mattress, Gypsy: A Musical Fable
- 1974 I Do! I Do!, 1776, The Fantasticks, High Button Shoes
- 1973 Who Said What To Whom, Fiddler on the Roof, You're a Good Man, Charlie Brown, Fiorello!
- 1972 Hello, Dolly!, Jacques Brel is Alive and Well and Living in Paris, Annie Get Your Gun
- 1971 Mame, Oliver!
- 1970 A Funny Thing Happened on the Way to the Forum, Amahl and the Night Visitors, Help, Help, the Globolinks!

=== 1960s ===
- 1969 She Loves Me, West Side Story
- 1968 How to Succeed in Business Without Really Trying, The Sound of Music
- 1967 Paint Your Wagon, South Pacific
- 1966 My Fair Lady, The Most Happy Fella
- 1964 The Medium, Amelia Goes to the Ball, Bye Bye Birdie, Kiss Me, Kate
- 1963 Where's Charley?, Guys and Dolls
- 1962 The Gypsy Baron, The Music Man
- 1960 Song Of Normandy, Oklahoma!

=== 1950s ===
- 1958 Naughty Marietta, Fanny, La Périchole, The Telephone, R.S.V.P., Down in the Valley
- 1957 The Merry Widow, Finian's Rainbow
- 1956 Die Fledermaus, Show Boat
- 1955 Music in the Air, Carousel
- 1954 The New Moon, Sweethearts
- 1953 Brigadoon, The Yeomen of the Guard
- 1952 School For Wives, The Red Mill
- 1951 The Chocolate Soldier, Iolanthe
- 1950 The Wizard of the Nile, The Mikado

=== 1940s ===
- 1949 The Gondoliers, Chimes of Normandy
- 1948 The Sorcerer, Chanticleer Hall
- 1947 The Pirates of Penzance, Robin Hood, Patience
- 1946 H.M.S. Pinafore, The Firefly
- 1942 A Waltz Dream
- 1941 Iolanthe

=== 1930s ===
- 1939 The Mikado, H.M.S. Pinafore, Hänsel and Gretel
- 1938 The Bartered Bride, The Gondoliers
- 1937 Lovely Galatea, Trial by Jury, Patience
- 1936 The Gondoliers, Chanticleer Hall
- 1934 Patience, The Troubadour, The Monte Bank
- 1933 Trial By Jury
- 1932 Under Cuban Skies, Lovely Galatea
- 1931 Marriage of Nanette
- 1930 Bells of Capistrano
- 1929 Sailor Made

=== Special events ===
- The First Five Years - A fundraiser cabaret/revue night featuring songs from all the shows produced in the first five year at the current location.
- Spontaneous Broadway in partnership with Mopco Improv Theatre
90th Anniversary Concert - March 24, 2017
