= Anneliese van der Pol =

Dutch actress (born 1984)

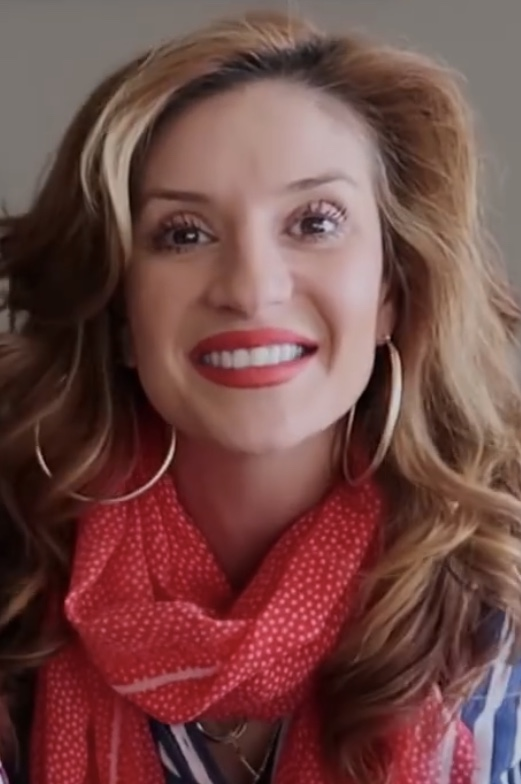
- van der Pol in March 2019
- Born: Anneliese Louise van der Pol; September 23, 1984 (age 42); Naaldwijk, South Holland, Netherlands
- Education: Orange County High School of the Arts
- Occupations: Actress; singer
- Years active: 1990–present
- Spouse: Johnno Wilson (m. 2024)
- Children: 1

Anneliese Louise van der Pol (born September 23, 1984) is a Dutch actress and singer. She is best known for her portrayal of Chelsea Daniels on the Disney Channel series That's So Raven (2003–2007) and its spin-off Raven's Home (2017–2022). In association with Disney Channel, van der Pol has recorded several songs, including "Over It", which was featured on the Stuck in the Suburbs soundtrack.

Beyond her involvement with Disney Channel, van der Pol has had an extensive theater career, most notably appearing as Belle in the Broadway production of Beauty and the Beast.

== Life and career ==
=== Early life and work ===
Van der Pol was born in Naaldwijk, South Holland, to Willem van der Pol, who is Dutch and the director of the Physical Plant at the California State University in Fullerton, California, and Dyan Ross, an American from Brooklyn, New York. Van der Pol's mother named her after Anne Frank after visiting the house where Frank hid (Van der Pol's mother is Jewish). Anneliese has two older sisters, Rachel and Sarah. Van der Pol's family moved to the United States when she was three years old, and she retains dual American and Dutch citizenship.

Van der Pol attended school in Bellflower, California, where she began acting in third grade at Washington Elementary School. She attended Bellflower Middle School and High School, then transferred to the acclaimed Orange County High School of the Arts in Santa Ana, California, where she graduated in 2002.

In 1999, Van der Pol played Sandy Dumbrowsky in the Huntington Beach Playhouse revival of Grease, which earned her a Bobbi Award for "Best Actress in a Musical". She played Eva Perón in the Buena Park Civic Theatre production of Evita in 1999 and received positive reviews from the Los Angeles Times. At the age of fifteen, she is also the youngest actress in theatrical history to play the role in a professional production. Van der Pol subsequently starred as "Laurey" in an Austin, Texas, musical theatre production of Oklahoma! from 2000 to 2001. Her performance earned her both an Austin Critics Table Award nomination for "Best Actress in a Musical" and a B. Iden Payne Nomination for "Best Featured Actress in a Musical".

=== 2000s ===
From 2003 to 2007, van der Pol played Chelsea Daniels in the Disney Channel series That's So Raven. In 2006, she appeared on the first installment of the Disney Channel Games and had a guest starring role on Kim Possible in the episode "And the Mole-Rat Will Be CGI".

In 2004, van der Pol recorded the song "Over It" for the Disney Channel Original Movie Stuck in the Suburbs which became the soundtrack's lead single. Her second solo recording, called "A Day in the Sun", a cover originally sung by Hilary Duff, appeared on the album That's So Raven Too!. Van der Pol has been associated with several other Disney music projects, including the Elton John song "Circle of Life" for a special edition of The Lion King DVD, "A Dream Is a Wish Your Heart Makes" for the Cinderella: Special Edition DVD, and "Candle on the Water" from Pete's Dragon on DisneyMania 4.

Anneliese also had a supporting role in Bratz: The Movie as Avery, a mean popular girl and best friend to the main antagonist.

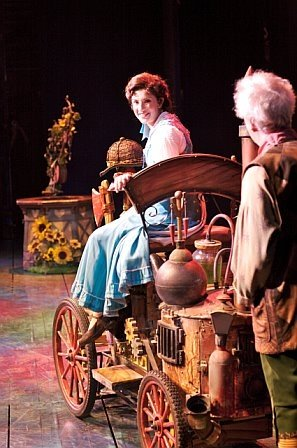
Van der Pol as Belle in Beauty and the Beast

In February 2007, it was announced that Van der Pol would be making her Broadway debut as Belle, in Beauty and the Beast. Van der Pol was the musical's 17th (and final) Belle. She played the role from April 3, 2007, to July 29, 2007, as the show reached its 5,464th (and final) performance. During her run as Belle, Van der Pol also performed at Bryant Park's Broadway in Bryant Park on July 12, 2007, along Beauty and the Beast co-stars Chris Hoch and Jeanne Lehmann, performing songs from the show. Prior to Beauty's final show, van der Pol appeared on Live with Regis and Kelly for a small interview discussing her Broadway debut and experiences with the show. She also discussed the origins of her name, and performed Beauty's "A Change in Me".

In May 2008, it was revealed that Van der Pol would play the role of Kathy in the new musical, Vanities, A New Musical. She originated the role of Kathy during the musical's Broadway previews in Pasadena, California from August 22, 2008, to September 28, 2008. Originally, the musical was scheduled to begin performances on Broadway February 2, 2009, at the Lyceum Theatre with an official opening on February 26, 2009, but the show's Broadway run was postponed due to the economic turmoil in the US and to focus on the future of the musical. The show then made its New York City debut Off-Broadway at the Second Stage Theatre on July 2, 2009, in previews, and officially opened on July 16, 2009. Performances continued through August 9, 2009. On August 21, 2009, she started recording the Original Cast Album for the musical alongside Lauren Kennedy and Sarah Stiles. The album was later released with Sh-k-Boom Records on December 15, 2009.

As of July 2009, she stated she had received her fourth call-back for the role of Glinda in Wicked on Broadway. Van der Pol appeared in a twelve part miniseries revival of Shalom Sesame (the Israeli version of Sesame Street). The series premiered during the Hanukkah holiday in December 2010.

In September 2009, Van der Pol starred as Esther Smith in the Theatre Under The Stars production of Meet Me in St. Louis that had a limited run from September 29 to October 11, 2009. In December 2009, Van der Pol made a guest appearance on The Battery's Down, as Rhonda Busby Smith. The episode premiered on December 1, 2009, on YouTube, where the web-series ran for two seasons.

=== 2010s ===
Van der Pol starred in Jason Friedberg and Aaron Seltzer's spoof film, Vampires Suck, based on the Twilight series. Van der Pol plays the role of Jennifer, Becca's new best friend. The film's trailer exclusively premiered on Break.com on July 7, 2010, featuring Anneliese's character introducing the cast of Jersey Shore. To promote the film, Van der Pol made appearances during New York Comic Con weekend for meet-and-greets with fans and to join a live discussion panel for Vampires Suck, along with co-star Matt Lanter. She also participated in a fashion pictorial tribute to teen films for Zooey Magazine. The pictorial was shot by David Nguyen and paid tribute to Pretty Woman, Romy and Michele's High School Reunion, 10 Things I Hate About You, The Princess Diaries, and Legally Blonde.

Van der Pol appeared in the thriller film, Cats Dancing on Jupiter, alongside Amanda Righetti and Jonathan Bennett. Van der Pol returned to television as a guest star in NBC's television series, Friends with Benefits. Van der Pol also returned to the Disney Channel in a guest starring role on Shake It Up, as Ronnie, a former dancer of Shake It Up Chicago! The episode, "Reunion It Up!" premiered on April 10, 2011.

Van der Pol had been cast as "Fiona MacLeod" in Arthur Kopit and Anton Dudley's "A Dram of Drummhicit", a Scottish play presented by La Jolla Playhouse. The Scottish play started previews May 17, 2011, in San Diego. On April 24, Van der Pol announced that she would not be continuing with the production, due to artistic differences between herself and the play's director.

In September 2011, Van der Pol was cast to perform in For the Record: Tarantino in Concert, conceived and directed by Shane Scheel and Christopher Lloyd Bratten. The show featured songs and scenes from the films of Quentin Tarantino, including Pulp Fiction and Inglourious Basterds, and ran from September 29 to November 12. Van der Pol continued to be part of the 'For the Record' series throughout 2012 with For the Record: John Hughes, For the Record: Baz Luhrmann and again in For the Record: Tarantino in Concert. She went on to record the production's first cast recording, For the Record: Tarantino which was released through LML Music on November 13, 2012.

From April to May 2012, she starred as Marian Almond in the Pasadena Playhouse production of The Heiress.

She played the lead role in the Arizona Theatre Company's production of Paul Gordon's new musical, Emma, which ran from December 1, 2012, to January 20, 2013. She returned to the Arizona Theatre Company in Stephen Wrentmore's production of The Importance of Being Earnest as Gwendolyn Fairfax. The show ran in Tucson from September 14, 2013, through October 5, 2013, and in Phoenix from October 10, 2013, through October 27, 2013.

Van der Pol appeared in an industry reading for the highly anticipated Ghostlight, A New Musical, as the central role of Olive Thomas, in New York. Van der Pol was joined by Robert Cuccioli, Rachel Bay Jones, Jennifer Hope Wills, Trevor McQueen, and Kimberly Faye Greenberg. In July 2014, she played Millie Dillmount in the Will Rogers Memorial Center production of Thoroughly Modern Millie.

On November 14, 2016, it was reported that Van der Pol would reprise her role as Chelsea Daniels for the second That's So Raven spin-off series Raven's Home, which premiered on July 21, 2017. She was a main cast member for the first four seasons.

== Personal life ==
In 2006, van der Pol was arrested for DUI in Los Angeles after hitting a parked car and causing damage to two other cars according to the police. She had a blood alcohol level of 0.19, more than twice the legal limit in California. Van der Pol pleaded no contest to two misdemeanors. She was sentenced in 2007, and was ordered to go on probation for 36 months, as well as pay fines and assessments and attend an alcohol education program. The probation ended in 2010.

On December 23, 2023, van der Pol announced her engagement to her Raven's Home co-star Johnno Wilson. The pair married in Santa Barbara, California on December 11, 2024. Their daughter was born on December 3, 2025. On August 26, 2026, van der Pol announced that she and her husband are expecting another daughter.

== Filmography ==
=== Film ===
Year	Show	Role	Notes
2001	Divorce: The Musical	Chelsey Weber	
2005	Horror High	Rachael Morrs	
2007	Bratz	Avery	
2010	Vampires Suck	Jennifer	
2011	Extremely Decent	Jess	
2011	Wish Wizard	Fairyista	
2011	Cats Dancing on Jupiter	Dayna	
2018	5 Weddings	Whitney Simmons	

=== Television ===
Year	Show	Role	Awards & notes
2003–2007	Express Yourself	Herself	Interstitial series
2003–2007	That's So Raven	Chelsea Daniels	Main role
2005	Totally Suite New Year's Eve	Herself	
2005	Katbot	Katbot / Katerina Botenski	Voice role; unsold television pilot
2006	Kim Possible	Heather	Voice role; episode: "And the Mole-Rat Will Be CGI"
2006	The Disney Channel Games	Herself	Contestant
2009	The Battery's Down	Rhonda Busby Smith	Episode: "The Party's Over"
2009	Chelsea Daniels on the Diamond	Chelsea Daniels	Unsold television pilot
2010–2011	Shalom Sesame	Herself	Host
2011	Friends with Benefits	Beth	Episode: "The Benefit of the Unspoken Dynamic"
2011	Shake It Up	Ronnie	Episode: "Reunion It Up"
2017	Shane and Friends	Herself	Episode: "Anneliese van der Pol"
2017–2022	Raven's Home	Chelsea Daniels Grayson	Main role (seasons 1–4); special guest star (season 5)
2020	Bunk'd	Chelsea Daniels Grayson	Episode: "Raven About Bunk'd: Part 2"
2020	Celebrity Family Feud	Herself	Contestant; episode: "Mixed-ish vs. Disney Channel Moms"
2024	Big Name B*tches	Herself	Presenter

== Stage ==
Year	Production	Role	Awards & Notes
1990	The Sleeping Beauty Ballet	Little Red Riding Hood	
1991	The Glory of Christmas	Soloist	
1991	The Sound of Music	Brigitta	
1991	The Will Rogers Follies	Mary Rogers	
1996	Eleanor, An American Love Story	Young Eleanor Roosevelt	
1997	Catch a Falling Star	Sheree	
1998	Murphy's Law	Kelly	
1999	Fiddler on the Roof	Chava	
1999	Grease	Sandy	
1999	Beguiled Again	Principal	
1999	Evita	Eva "Evita" Peron	
2000	Oklahoma!	Laurey	Nominated: B. Iden Payne Award – "Best Featured Actress in a Musical"; Nominated: Austin Critics Table Award – "Best Actress in a Musical"
2002	The Nutcracker	Clara	
2002	Coppélia	Coppélia	
2007	Beauty and the Beast	Belle	Broadway debut/Last Belle on Broadway
2008	Vanities, A New Musical	Kathy	Won: StaceSceneLA.com Outstanding Achievement in 2008–09 – Outstanding Achievement by a Lead Actress (Musical)
2009	Vanities, A New Musical	Kathy	Off-Broadway
2009	Meet Me in St. Louis	Esther Smith	
2012	The Heiress	Marion Almond	
2012–2013	Emma	Emma Woodhouse	Arizona Theatre Company
2013	The Importance of Being Earnest	Gwendolyn Fairfax	
2014	Thoroughly Modern Millie	Millie Dillmount	Fort Worth, TX
2016	A Taste of Things to Come	Joan Smith	
2018	The Cuban and the Redhead	Lucille Ball	
2018	Annie	Lily St. Regis	Scottsdale Music Theatre Company, Scottsdale, AZ
2019	54 Below	Herself	Concert
2023-2024	Disney Princess: The Concert Tour	Herself	Mundial Tour
2026	Heathers: The Musical	Ms. Fleming	Off-Broadway

== Discography ==
=== Cast recordings ===
Year	Title	Label
2009	Vanities, A New Musical (Kathy)	Sh-K-Boom Records
2012	For the Record: Tarantino	LML Music

=== Selected soundtracks and miscellaneous ===
Year	Song(s)	Album	Label
1999	"Winter Wonderland" (w/ Desi Arnaz Jr.) & various tracks	The Children of Christmas	Jason Williams
2003	"Circle of Life" (w/ Disney Channel Circle of Stars)	Disneymania 2	Walt Disney Records
2004	"That's So Raven" (w/ Raven-Symoné, Orlando Brown)	That's So Raven	Walt Disney Records
2004	"Over It"	Stuck in the Suburbs	Walt Disney Records
2006	"A Day in the Sun" "Friends" (w/ Raven-Symoné) "Let's Stick Together" (w/ Raven-Symoné, Kyle Massey)	That's So Raven Too!	Walt Disney Records
2006	"Candle on the Water" "A Dream Is a Wish Your Heart Makes" (w/ Disney Channel Circle of Stars)	Disneymania 4	Walt Disney Records
2012	"Stand Tall"	Pride the Movie – Single	O'Lloyd Records

== Awards and nominations ==
Year	Award	Category	Work	Result	Ref.
2000	Bobbi Award	Best Actress in a Musical	Grease	Won	
2005	Young Artist Award	Outstanding Young Performers in a TV Series (shared with Raven-Symoné, Orlando Brown, and Kyle Massey)	That's So Raven	Won	
