= BHT =

BHT may refer to:

- Berliner Hochschule für Technik, is the second largest University of Applied Sciences in Berlin
- Black hairy tongue
- Blue Hill Troupe, a New York City-based musical theatre company
- Boğaziçi Hava Taşımacılığı, a former Turkish airline
- Bosnia and Herzegovina Television
- Broken Hill type ore deposit
- Butylated hydroxytoluene, an organic compound
