= The Invisible Bankers =

1982 book by Andrew Tobias

- Author: Andrew Tobias
- Original title: Invisible Bankers: Everything the Insurance Industry Never Wanted You to Know
- Language: English
- Publisher: Simon & Schuster
- Publication date: January 1, 1982
- Publication place: United States
- Media type: Print (hardcover)
- Pages: 336
- ISBN: 978-0671228491

Invisible Bankers: Everything the Insurance Industry Never Wanted You to Know is a 1982 book on the insurance industry. It was written by the financial journalist Andrew Tobias who became famous for his earlier book The Only Investment Guide You'll Ever Need. It covers the financial details of life, auto, health and fire insurance—the types consumers normally buy.

Because insurers are frequently the victims of insurance fraud, insurance companies need to be on their guard. On the other hand, an unscrupulous insurer could, in theory, increase its profits by either inducing their insured to settle for less than the amount to which they are entitled, or from outright denial of valid claims in the hopes that a small yet significant number of the insured would either give up in discouragement, or wrongly believe that their claims were invalid. This makes dealings with insurers difficult. This book was the first guide to ordinary consumers into both the math and the business side of insurance.

== See also ==
- The Only Investment Guide You'll Ever Need
- The Bankers by Martin Mayer
