= Jill Salvino =

American director, producer and writer known for Between the Shades documentary

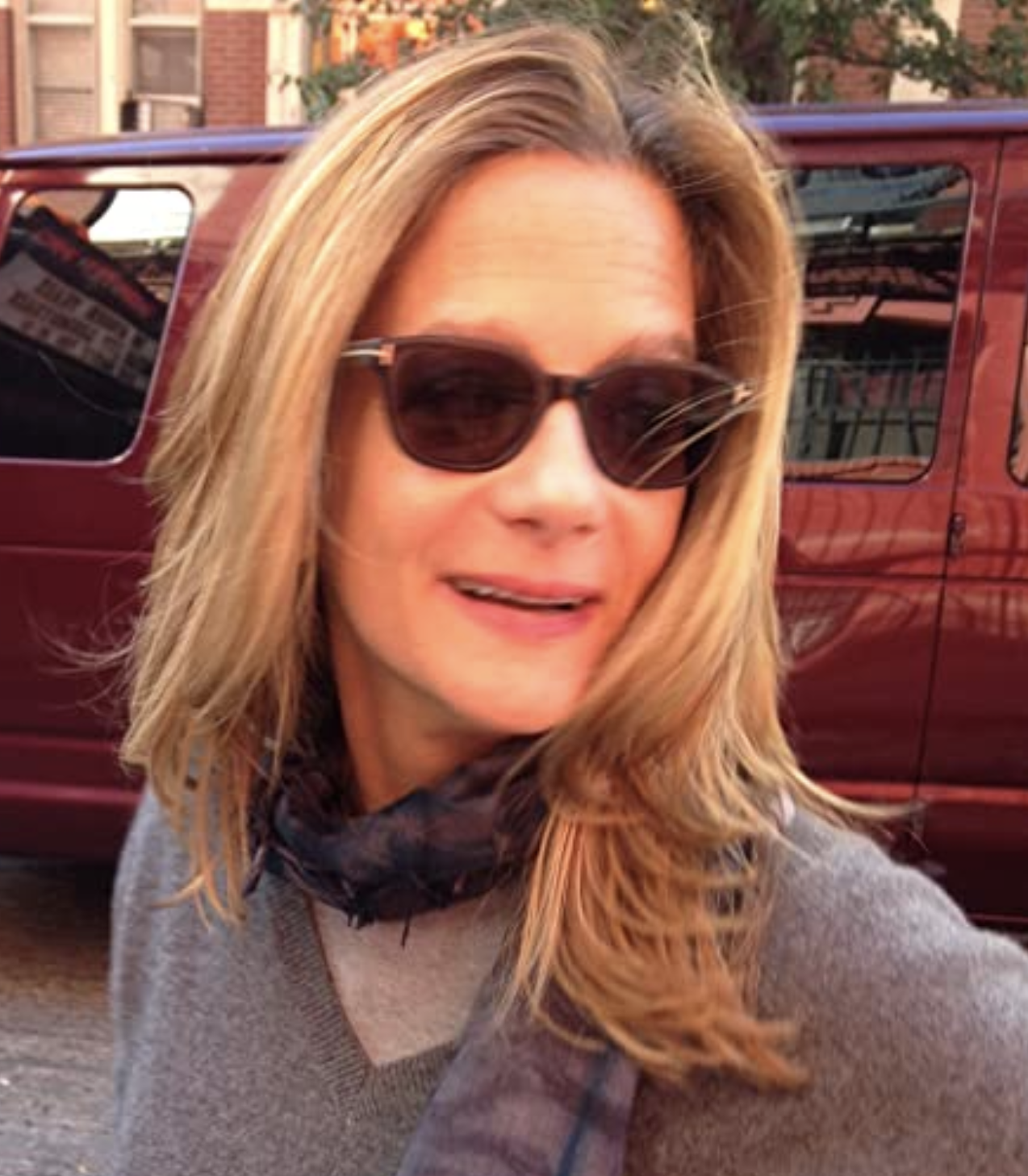
Jill Salvino

Jill Salvino is an American director, producer and writer known for Between the Shades.

Salvino directed the short film "Taking it for Granted", which has been featured at the Capital City Film Festival in 2014. Salvino has directed the short "Lies People Tell", which was featured at the Americas Film Festival of New York in 2015 and at the KASHISH Mumbai International Queer Film Festival in 2015 where it received the Narrative Short Award. "Lies People Tell" won the Honorable Mention Award.

Salvino directed and produced the documentary Between the Shades, featuring 50 conversations that explore many shades of LGBTQIA activism, including interviews with Kathy Najimy, Democratic Treasurer Andrew Tobias, and actress Beth Malone.
