= John Mumford =

John Mumford may refer to:

- John Mumford (American football) (born 1956), American football coach and former player
- John Mumford (athlete) (1918–1999), Australian athlete
- John B. Mumford, US deputy assistant secretary of labor, convicted along with Cortes Wesley Randell, for selling unregistered securities
