= NSMC =

Do you want:

- North/South Ministerial Council, an intergovernmental organisation established under the Belfast Agreement
- North Shore Medical Center, former name of Salem Hospital, a hospital complex in Salem, Massachusetts.
- North Sichuan Medical College, a public medical school in Nanchong, Sichuan, China
- National Student Marketing Corporation, the name of a high-flying stock in the mid-1960s. Later was investigated for fraud.
- Nawaz Sharif Medical College, a medical school situated in Gujrat, Pakistan.
