= Vanities, A New Musical (album) =

Cast recording by Anneliese van der Pol, Lauren Kennedy, Sarah Stiles
- Released: December 15, 2009
- Recorded: August 21, 2009
- Genre: Showtunes
- Length: 50:38
- Label: Sh-K-Boom
- Producer: Joel Moss

Professional ratings
Review scores
Source	Rating
Allmusic	3/5 stars

Vanities, A New Musical contains the songs from the Off-Broadway musical, Vanities, A New Musical, The album features music and lyrics by David Kirshenbaum, and a book by Jack Heifner. It was recorded after the musical's Off-Broadway run. The album was released digitally on December 15, 2009 and physically on February 2, 2010. The album features Anneliese van der Pol as Kathy, Lauren Kennedy as Mary, and Sarah Stiles as Joanne.

== Track listing ==
1. "Setting Your Sights (Reflections)" – Anneliese van der Pol, Lauren Kennedy, Sarah Stiles – 2:55
2. "I Don't Wanna Miss a Thing" – Anneliese van der Pol, Lauren Kennedy, Sarah Stiles – 3:16
3. "An Organized Life" – Anneliese van der Pol, Lauren Kennedy, Sarah Stiles – 4:17
4. "I Can't Imagine" – Anneliese van der Pol, Lauren Kennedy, Sarah Stiles – 3:42
5. "Setting Your Sights (City Limits)" – Anneliese van der Pol, Lauren Kennedy, Sarah Stiles – 3:44
6. "An Organized Life (1968)" – Anneliese van der Pol, Lauren Kennedy, Sarah Stiles – 2:02
7. "Fly Into The Future" – Lauren Kennedy – 3:53
8. "Cute Boys With Short Haircuts" – Anneliese van der Pol – 4:20
9. "Let Life Happen" – Anneliese van der Pol, Lauren Kennedy, Sarah Stiles – 3:24
10. "Setting Your Sights (What You Wanted)" – Anneliese van der Pol – 1:23
11. "The Same Old Music" – Anneliese van der Pol, Lauren Kennedy, Sarah Stiles – 4:28
12. "An Organized Life (1974)" – Anneliese van der Pol, Lauren Kennedy, Sarah Stiles – 2:54
13. "The Argument" – Anneliese van der Pol, Lauren Kennedy, Sarah Stiles – 2:01
14. "Friendship Isn't What It Used To Be" – Anneliese van der Pol, Lauren Kennedy, Sarah Stiles – 3:55
15. "Looking Good" – Anneliese van der Pol, Lauren Kennedy, Sarah Stiles – 4:24
