= Jarrod Emick =

American actor

- Born: July 2, 1969 (age 56); Fort Eustis, Virginia, US
- Education: South Dakota State University
- Occupation: Actor
- Years active: 1991–present

Jarrod Emick (born July 2, 1969) is an American actor primarily performing in musical theatre. Emick received Tony, Drama Desk, and Theatre World awards for his performance in the 1994 revival of Damn Yankees.

== Early life, family and education ==
Emick was born in Fort Eustis, Virginia. His father was "a career military man." He and his older brother were raised on a farm/ranch in Oral, South Dakota. As a young teen, he began attending the Black Hills Playhouse, a program in Custer State Park run by the University of South Dakota that was a combination of summer stock theater and summer camp. His first role was Billy Ray in On Golden Pond.

He attended Hot Springs High School in nearby Hot Springs, South Dakota. He subsequently attended South Dakota State University for two years.

== Career ==
=== Stage ===
At age 21, Emick was an ensemble performer in a US touring company of Les Miserables. His Broadway debut was in Miss Saigon as a replacement for the role of Chris. His performances in 1993 in the touring company received greater comparative acclaim than his Broadway counterpart. His next role as Joe Hardy in Damn Yankees won him even more acclaim: a Tony Award for Best Featured Actor in a Musical, a Drama Desk Award for Outstanding Supporting Actor, and a Theatre World Award.

Later Broadway roles have included Brad Majors in The Rocky Horror Show, Greg Connell in The Boy From Oz, and a role in the musical Ring of Fire. He performed in a West End theater production of The Full Monty. He played Michael Wiley in Contact at the North Shore Music Theatre. He played Chad in the Elvis Presley musical All Shook Up. In 2005, he played the role of F. Scott Fitzgerald in Frank Wildhorn's Waiting For The Moon, opposite Lauren Kennedy. He played the roles of the Doctors in Next to Normal at the Milwaukee Repertory Theater through January 2012, and he played Tick/Mitzi in Priscilla, Queen of the Desert at the Ogunquit Playhouse from August 10 to September 3, 2016.

=== Television ===
Emick acted in the 1996 TV movie Andersonville. He was the star of two short-lived Fox series, L.A. Firefighters (1996) and Pacific Palisades (1997); and also performed in an episode of It’s True.

== Personal life ==
As of 2019, Emick was residing in Las Vegas with his wife and two sons.

He has been an avid scuba diver.

== Awards and nominations ==
Year	Award	Category	Nominated work	Result
1994	Tony Award	Best Featured Actor in a Musical	Damn Yankees	Won
1994	Drama Desk Award	Outstanding Featured Actor in a Musical	Damn Yankees	Won
1994	Theatre World Award		Damn Yankees	Won
2003	WhatsOnStage Awards	Best Actor in a Musical	The Full Monty	Nominated
