= Waiting for the Moon (musical) =

- An American Love Story
- Official Artwork for Musical
- Music: Frank Wildhorn
- Lyrics: Jack Murphy
- Book: Jack Murphy, Vincent Marini
- Productions: 2005 Marlton, New Jersey; 2012 Flat Rock Playhouse NC; 2015 Tokyo, Japan

Waiting for the Moon: An American Love Story, formerly Zelda or Scott & Zelda: The Other Side Of Paradise, is a musical with music by Frank Wildhorn and lyrics by Jack Murphy. It is the second finished production the two have presented, having previously collaborated on The Civil War. The show had its world premiere at the Lenape Regional Performing Arts Center in Marlton, New Jersey in July 2005. The musical is based on the lives of famed American author F. Scott Fitzgerald and his wife, Zelda Fitzgerald.

== Production history ==
The Lenape Regional Performing Arts Center hosted the world premiere of the musical, in a production that ran from July 20, 2005 through July 31, 2005. Directed by Vincent Marini with choreography by Andy Blankenbuehler the cast starred Jarrod Emick and Lauren Kennedy.

Wildhorn had connections with the theatre through Linda Eder's concerts, amongst other engagements including the early renditions of the Jekyll & Hyde: Resurrection tour. Wildhorn had said he had hoped that Lenape would become "a real successful regional theatre, that he could use as a laboratory for his new productions."

Murphy titled the show Waiting For The Moon, as director Vincent Marini didn't believe that Scott & Zelda sounded right for it. After a dinner outing, Murphy's wife suggested the title and both Murphy and Marini liked it enough that it was adopted.

The rest of the creative team for this production included Ron Melrose as music director, Kim Scharnberg as orchestrator, Rob Odorisio as scenic designer, Howell Binkley as lighting designer, Janine McCabe as costume designer, Nick Kourtides as sound designer, and Michael Clark credited with the projections design. The show was produced by Roy Miller and Vincent Marini, with Angelo del Rossi as consulting producer.

A planned production at North Carolina Theatre (Raleigh, North Carolina) in July 2007 was cancelled. It was to star once again Lauren Kennedy, with the potential of husband Alan Campbell in the role of Scott.

In October 2012, the musical received its second treatment, again with Kennedy and Emmick in their respective roles. The musical was renamed Zelda: An American Love Story and played at the Flat Rock Playhouse (North Carolina) where Marini had become artistic director.

In October 2015, a new production opened in Tokyo, Japan.

== Plot summary ==
The show opens with Zelda getting ready for a ball ("Everything & More"). Scott meanwhile is preparing a manuscript ("I've Got Things to Say"). The musical attempted to show the almost tragic lifestyle of the famed couple — often trying to live up to higher standards ("Always," "Paris," "Back on Top," "Something Enchanted," etc.). Their lifestyle was considered reckless ("Money to Burn"), with Zelda thought to be particularly bizarre for the time period in which she lived (1925), often doing things most women would not think of ("What about Me?"). Act I ends with Zelda in an institution, although many of her conditions unknown, yearning for the upcoming out there ("Something of My Life").

Act II opens with more trips for Scott & Zelda, including Scott's attempt at the Hollywood screenwriting industry ("The Rivera," "Hollywood," etc.). However, Zelda is back to the institution declaring that life isn't fair ("Easy"). Scott's career is fading fast ("Losing the Light") while working in Hollywood. Scott realizes he's lost—both his career (although it would flourish after his death) and Zelda, who has not visited ("Waiting for the Moon"). Zelda, delusional, believes that Scott is coming to take her to a ball. It is now 1948, years after Scott has died. A reporter comes to ensure she is okay, after he has since stopped years before covering the two. She laments over who Scott really was ("Remember"). In a fairytale vision, she sees Scott taking her to the dance, and they kiss beneath the Moon as the curtain closes.

Wildhorn further explains that "Much of story is told in dance numbers. There's a lot of dancing in this show, about 6 big dance numbers.... The choreography is a major part of this production." Nearly all of the twenty songs in the production were sung by either the Zelda character, Scott character, or those two together. Ensemble was used as small characters with short verses, backing up the other two.

== Songs ==
- Everything & More – Zelda
- Something Enchanted – Scott and Zelda
- Always – Scott and Zelda
- I've Got Things To Say – Scott
- Yes! – Zelda
- You Do Everything for Me – Scott and Zelda
- Subway Transition
- You Do Everything For Me (reprise) – Scott and Zelda
- Money to Burn – Scott and Zelda
- Typing Tap
- Back on Top – Scott and Zelda
- Paris: Ensemble
- What about me? – Zelda
- Paris (reprise) – Ensemble
- Something of My Life – Zelda
- Entr'acte
- The Heat of the Night – Zelda
- Hollywood – Scott
- Easy – Zelda
- Losing the Light
- I've Got Things to Say (reprise) – Scott
- Waiting for the Moon – Scott
- Remember – Zelda
- Everything & More (reprise) – Company

== Recordings ==
Although there were plans to record the world premiere cast and release it for commercial purposes, these initial intentions have since been abandoned. Lauren Kennedy, the original Zelda, has, however, released the song "Easy" on her latest solo album, entitled Now and Here. Other sound clips (including a video preview) can be found at Jack Murphy's website.
