= Blue Hill Troupe =

American musical theatre performing company and charitable organization

- Formation: 1924
- Founder: Seth and Alida Milliken
- Type: Nonprofit
- Legal status: 501(c)3
- Purpose: Raising funds for charity through musical theatre performances
- Location: New York City
- Website: https://bht.org/

The Blue Hill Troupe, Ltd. (often referred to as the Troupe or BHT), is a musical theatre performing company and charitable organization based in New York City. The Troupe is the only musical theatre company in the city that donates all the net proceeds of its performances to charity.

Formed in 1924 in Blue Hill, Maine, the Troupe moved to New York City in 1926 and has continued to mount annual performances ever since. It began by staging Gilbert and Sullivans' comic operas, becoming the first performing group in the United States to produce all 13 extant Savoy operas. The Troupe also began to give concerts, an annual gala and "out-of-town" performances. Since 1984, it has also produced a second fully-staged work of musical theatre annually.

Each year, the Troupe selects a New York City charity as the principal object of its philanthropy, seeking to have the greatest charitable impact with the funds it raises through its performances. Over the decades, it has donated an inflation-adjusted total of more than $12 million. For more than a century, the Troupe has also served as a social outlet for its hundreds of members, who volunteer their time and talents towards its theatrical and charitable activities.

== Early history ==
The Troupe was founded in the summer of 1924 near the country estate of Dr. Seth Minot Milliken (1875–1957), a member of the Milliken textile family, and his wife, Alida née Lesse (1879–1975), in Blue Hill, Maine, when the couple was searching for ways to keep their teenage children busy and away from the cinema and other "pernicious influence[s] of the roaring twenties". A musically talented friend who was staying with them, Elsie Goddard, suggested recruiting their children and neighboring summer residents to perform Gilbert and Sullivan's H.M.S. Pinafore. After several weeks of rehearsal, with Goddard directing, the show took place that August on the deck of the Millikens' 103-foot schooner, Shawna, moored offshore. Smaller boats delivered Sir Joseph with his sisters, cousins and aunts, to the Pinafore, and floating docks held brave musicians who battled rising winds and waves sloshing over their feet including, precariously, Mrs. Walter Sullivan at the piano. The audience sat on the shore, the stone porches of the boathouse and the docks of the local yacht club as darkness fell, with a full moon, various spotlights and car headlights illuminating the show. Proceeds from ticket sales were donated to the East Blue Hill Library.

The performance was deemed a success, and the next summer, the Millikens and friends produced The Mikado, this time on dry but foggy land, in front of the Millikens' nearby home. The funds raised were given to a hospital and a church in Blue Hill. The following spring of 1926, the Troupe moved to New York City where, at the Millikens' Upper East Side house, it presented The Pirates of Penzance. The Gondoliers followed the next year, with performances in both Manhattan and Maine, and since then the Troupe has been based in New York City, with a mission to raise money for charity. The Blue Hill Troupe was not officially named until 1930. Seth Milliken was the Troupe's first president, from 1924 to 1934. In 1952 the company filed a Certificate of Incorporation in New York State; its "Purpose" clause, written in Gilbertian verse, begins:

One Gilbert and one Sullivan have lured us all together,
To sing their songs and say their lines and talk about the weather.
Our purpose is to practice up until we can't be betta
Then set our stage, invite our friends and give an operetta. ...
To prove our motives profitless with no uncertain clarity
Our net return we always give to some deserving charity.

== Description ==
=== Productions ===
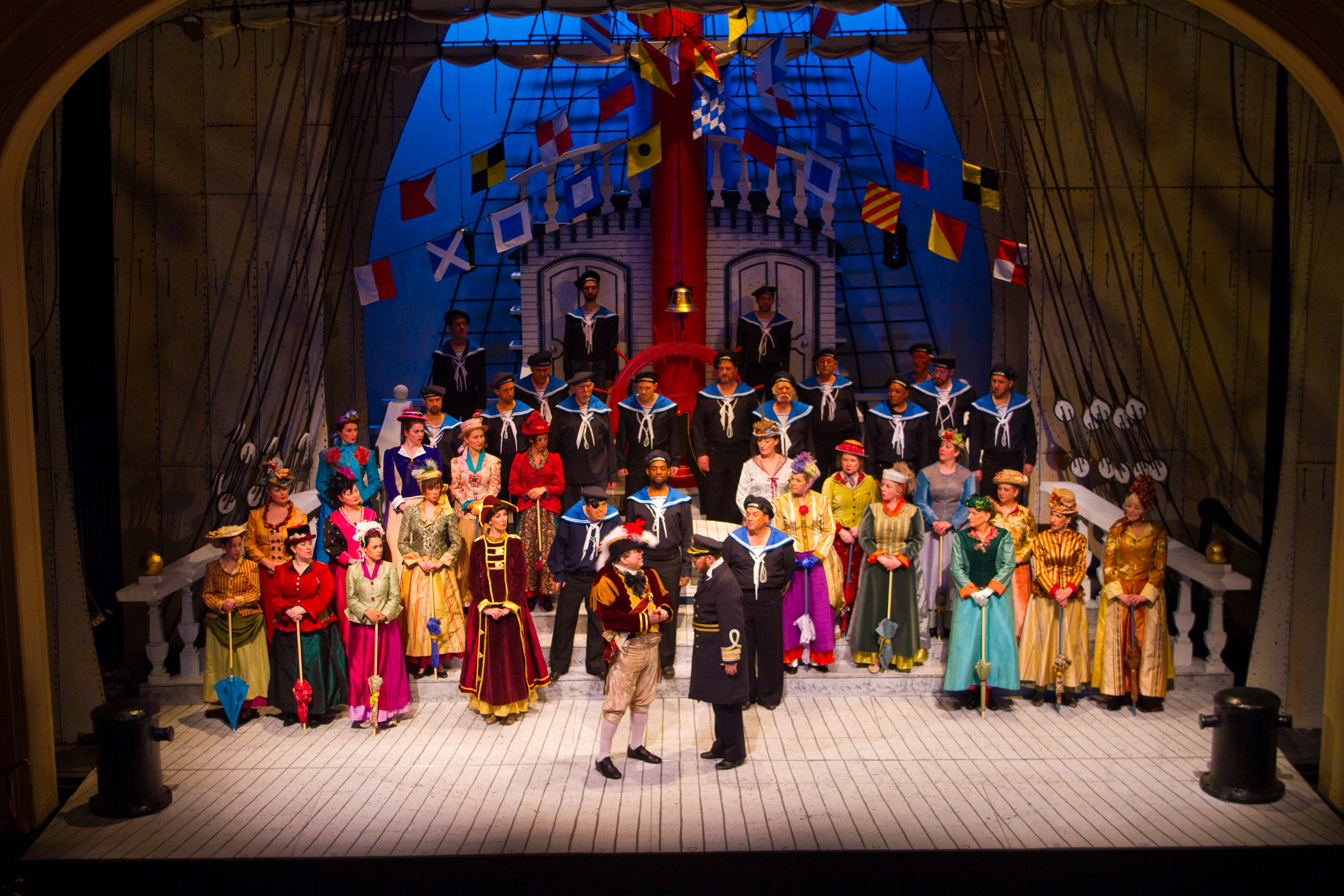
The Troupe's 2011 production of H.M.S. Pinafore

The Troupe has performed every year since 1924, except for 1929 and 2020 (during the COVID-19 pandemic theatre shutdown). The company presents a Gilbert and Sullivan opera each year, generally in the spring. It was the first American company to produce all 13 extant Savoy operas, completing the canon in 1946, and some of its members were the first Americans to appear in all of them. The Troupe has even produced a version of the "lost" Gilbert and Sullivan opera, Thespis, with a score by Sullivan and Thomas Z. Shepard. In the 1930s and 1940s, its director and music director were Benjamin T. Hoogland and Edmond W. Rickett, who together wrote the book Let's Do Some Gilbert and Sullivan, a handbook used by many companies in producing the operas. Later, Charles Dodsley Walker, music director of the Church of the Heavenly Rest, conducted the Troupe for 35 years. In 1984, the Troupe began to perform a second fully-staged work of musical theatre each November.

The group also organizes its members to sing Christmas carols in hospital wards and at fire stations, and gives concerts, as well as an annual gala and additional out-of-town performances; during World War II, it sang concerts at West Point. For many years in the 1990s and early 2000s, the Troupe performed annual concerts at the Metropolitan Museum of Art. It has twice performed concerts in Carnegie Hall accompanied by The New York Pops. Other concerts are given annually at such venues as university alumni clubs and nursing homes. The Troupe has also twice performed at the International Gilbert and Sullivan Festival in England, once winning the festival with its production of Patience. During the 21st century, the Troupe has usually performed its spring shows at the theatre of El Museo del Barrio.

Vogue judged the Troupe "very, very good, even by professional standards". A New York Times critic, Theodore W. Libbey Jr., called the Troupe's Iolanthe "flawless from a technical standpoint and showed polish on all levels. Aside from a few overly busy scenes ... stage business went smoothly. ... The musical preparation of the chorus was impressive, as was the work of many of the principals." In National Review, John O'Sullivan thought the Troupe's production of Utopia, Limited "sparkling, witty, and thoroughly entertaining". Tim Page, writing in The New York Times, commented that a Troupe production of Princess Ida showed "a remarkable flair for the impeccably proper lunacy that is the soul of the Savoy operas." Times critic John Rockwell's review of Pirates said that the company's "productions are actually quite lavish, even quasi-professional. ... There was also some stalwart acting". The Troupe's 100th anniversary production in 2024 was H.M.S. Pinafore, the same opera with which it had debuted in 1924. Also in 2024, the Troupe and two of its conductors, Marisa Green and Eric Peterson, were recognized by The American Prize in the opera conducting category.

=== Charity ===
The Troupe gives all of the net proceeds from its performances to New York City charities, usually a new one each year. It is the only musical theater group in New York City that donates its net proceeds to charity. The Troupe seeks to have the greatest charitable impact with the funds it raises through its performances; charities to which the group donates have often included hospitals, and others that focus on healthcare, education, the arts, disadvantaged youth and families, and the elderly. They have included God's Love We Deliver, Prep for Prep, Covenant House, National Multiple Sclerosis Society, I Have a Dream Foundation, The Legal Aid Society, New York Society for the Prevention of Cruelty to Children, Goodwill Industries, Children's Aid Society, The Doe Fund, Rocking the Boat, the Young People's Chorus of New York City and the Fortune Society. By combining performing, social activities and charitable giving, the Troupe's members "get back in happiness whatever they give". Over the decades, the company has donated an inflation-adjusted total of more than $12 million.

=== Membership ===
The hundreds of members of the Troupe volunteer their time to rehearse and perform, create the sets, costumes, props and lighting, provide stage management, manage the house and sell tickets and program advertising, and do the administrative tasks of running a large theatrical and charitable organization. Since its early years, however, the group has employed professional stage and music directors, including Andy Sandberg, choreographers, including Dan Knechtges, accompanists, including George Malloy, and orchestra musicians. Not everyone who joins the Troupe has a desire to perform onstage: some apply for membership as "frontstagers" and must pass musical auditions, while others may be admitted through an interview as dedicated "backstagers". New applicants are considered each autumn.

The Troupe was known, early on, as "a cultural outlet for the Upper East Side’s blue-blood set", and many members in the Troupe's early decades were listed on the Social Register. Later the Troupe's membership became mostly professional people and diversified. The first black member was artist Philemona Williamson, who joined in the early 1980s. Other notable Troupe members have included Jonathan Rabb, Morgan Murphy, Constantine Sidamon-Eristoff, Dyllan McGee, Emily Rutherfurd and Emily Rafferty, the last of whom served as the Troupe's president. Members often stay involved with the Troupe for decades, and over 100 couples have met and married through the company: Debutante Lois Lindon Smith joined in 1931 and soon married navy officer John Jay Schieffelin (later a Rear Admiral); they were both active lifelong members, and her membership lasted for 74 years until her death in 2007. Other members have parents and children involved in the Troupe. Members enjoy the friendships made and find camaraderie of the Troupe infectious. The company often designs its performances, and even its choice of charity partners, to provide social opportunities for its members, for example by scheduling out-of-town performances as part of a long weekend getaway.
