= Frederick S. Mates =

Frederick S. Mates, aka Frederic Mates, founded in August 1967 the Mates Investment Fund, a high-flying mutual fund during the 'Go-Go' 60s that later crashed in the bear market of the early 1970s. Mates ran his fund from an office he dubbed the "kibbutz" and with a young staff he called his "flower children". Mates put most of his fund into a letter stock known as Omega Equities. Mates in determining his funds assets assigned a value to the barely traded Omega of $16 a share, while having purchased the stock at $3.25 a share. Mates got into trouble over this practice which was routine in the 1960s and not uncommon even today, of accounting for letter stocks at a price different from what was paid for it. As a result, when confidence was lost in Mates' mutual fund and investors wanted to cash out, redemptions had to be suspended for a while, which the U.S. Securities and Exchange Commission condoned.

Mates was born in Brooklyn and graduated from Brooklyn College in 1954. According to a New York Times obituary, Mates died in Kansas City on December 25, 1982.

== See also ==
- Gerald Tsai
- Cortes Wesley Randell
