= The Bankers =

1974 book by Martin Mayer

- First edition cover
- Author: Martin Mayer
- Publisher: Weybright and Talley
- Publication date: 1974

The Bankers is the 1974 book by the economist-writer Martin Mayer that describes the industry just at the cusp of deregulation. At the time, banks had just been released from the interest rate ceilings of Regulation Q imposed by the Federal Reserve. Also, NOW (or negotiable orders of withdrawal) accounts allowed checkable deposits to earn interest. This period, the mid to late 1970s saw an explosion of financial markets innovation with money market mutual fund accounts, call and put options traded first over the counter then on listed exchanges and finally bank deregulation as failed banks were taken over by out of state banks.

== See also ==
- The Invisible Bankers: Everything the Insurance Industry Never Wanted You to Know
