= National Student Marketing Corporation =

- Industry: Marketing
- Founded: 1966; 59 years ago
- Founder: Cortes Wesley Randell
- Defunct: 1970
- Fate: Bankruptcy

National Student Marketing Corporation (N.S.M.C., NSMC) was the name of a company started by Cortes Wesley Randell, a Washington, D.C. business consultant, in 1966 during the height of the 'Go-Go' 60s stock market. The corporation catered to the youth market and was touted by various Wall Street professionals. Through publicity from acquisitions and the late 1960s bull market, the stock rose from its initial public offering price of $6 a share to $140. Several universities, including the Harvard endowment fund, invested in NSMC. After the crash of 1970, and after Randell had cashed out a portion of his shares, several Wall Street professionals were convicted of wrongdoing by the government. Some of these accused were later acquitted, with at least one spending some time in jail. Following an investigation into Randell's role in the stock crash, prosecutors alleged that he had misrepresented the company's earnings. He pleaded guilty in 1975 and was sentenced to 18 months in prison for stock-fraud conspiracy and three other counts of fraud. Investors sued Randell in civil court and were awarded $35 million.

Financial author Andrew Tobias was a marketing director at NSMC and wrote a book about his experiences entitled The Funny Money Game.

== See also ==
- Frederick S. Mates
