= Dan Knechtges =

Dan Knechtges (/kəˈnɛktɡəs/) is a director and choreographer, for musicals, opera, television, film and music videos. He is Artistic Director of Theatre Under the Stars in Houston, Texas.

== Life and career ==
Knechtges is from Grafton, Ohio and is a graduate of Midview High School and Otterbein College (1994), with a degree in musical theatre. As a child, he took dance lessons in Elyria, Ohio, where his sister was taking lessons. Immediately after college, he moved to New York where he began to work as a dancer and teacher, and soon he was getting choreography jobs, including eight of the Gilbert and Sullivan operas for the Blue Hill Troupe.

Knechtges' work on Broadway as choreographer includes the musicals The 25th Annual Putnam County Spelling Bee (2005), Xanadu (2007), 110 in the Shade (2007 revival), You May Now Worship Me (Special benefit concert, 2008), Sondheim on Sondheim (2010) and Lysistrata Jones (2011). He received nominations for the Tony Award, Best Choreography and Drama Desk Award, Outstanding Choreography for Xanadu. Knechtges' choreography for Sondheim on Sondheim was praised for making "excellent use of multiple layers offered to him by set designer Beowulf Boritt."

His off-Broadway work includes Nerds (2005); The 25th Annual Putnam County Spelling Bee (2005), for which he received the Lucille Lortel Award nomination, Outstanding Choreographer; Vanities: A New Musical (2009) (also at Theatreworks, California); and Citizen Ruth (New York International Fringe Festival, 2009). In regional theatre, he choreographed The Girl in the Frame at the Norma Terris Theatre in Chester, Connecticut (2005) and both directed and choreographed Give It Up!, with a book by Douglas Carter Beane at the Dallas Theater Center, Dallas, Texas (2010).

Knechtges choreographed the music video for Fatboy Slim's "It's a Wonderful Night. In 2008, in Berlin, Germany, he choreographed a stage version of Der Schuh des Manitu.

He became the Artistic Director of Theatre Under the Stars in Houston, Texas in 2017.
