= Between the Shades =

2017 documentary film

- Directed by: Jill Salvino
- Distributed by: Passion River Films
- Release date: June 17, 2017 (Soho International Film Fest)
- Running time: 82 min.
- Country: USA
- Language: English

Between the Shades is a 2017 documentary film directed by Jill Salvino. The film is focused on interviews and covers aspects of LGBTQ+ culture.

== Synopsis ==
The film includes over 50 interviews of varying ages, sexual orientations, genders, and races. Interviewees featured in the film include Beth Malone, Kathy Najimy and Andrew Tobias.

== Production and release ==
Between the Shades was inspired by conversation Salvino had with friends. It was funded through Kickstarter.

The film premiered at the Soho International Film Festival, and Salvino then took it to several other festivals, including the Queens World Film Festival, the Dances With Films Festival, and the Oxford Film Festival.

After Salvino partnered with a distributor, more than 200 public libraries and universities have licensed the film.

== Reception ==
In the Los Angeles Blade, John Paul King writes, "The speakers are engaged, passionate, proud of who they are and the journeys they have made – and the honesty of their truth-telling, coupled with the director's skilled shaping of their group narrative, keeps our interest riveted throughout." Tara Parker-Pope writes in The New York Times, "Since watching the film, I've asked the question “How gay are you?” or “How straight are you?” to many of my friends, starting some interesting dinner conversations. But it's a conversation that feels right for the times in which we live."

Tom Keogh of Video Librarian says Salvino "coaxes a common denominator of humanity from a wide spectrum of men and women in many forms, shapes, ages, colors, dress, class, education, and relationship preferences." Keogh also writes the film "becomes monotonous at times" while ultimately making "a solid argument for understanding and acceptance." Glenn Dunks of The Film Experience said Between the Shades had interesting aspects but that "in attempting to show the world what the L, G, B, T, Q and I is all about, Salvino's film misses too much." Amyana Bartley, writing for Film Inquiry called the film a "conversation" and said it "opens the door to seeing LGBTQ+ people as exactly what they are. Human."
