= Vanities, A New Musical =

- 2009 Off-Broadway Playbill
- Music: David Kirshenbaum
- Lyrics: David Kirshenbaum
- Book: Jack Heifner
- Basis: 1976 book Vanities
- Productions: 2006 Palo Alto; 2008 Pasadena Tryout; 2009 Off Broadway; 2016 West End

Vanities, A New Musical is a musical with music and lyrics by David Kirshenbaum and a book by Jack Heifner, based on the book and 1976 play of the same name. The musical premiered Off-Broadway in 2009, after an engagement at the Pasadena Playhouse, California in 2008. A revised version was then staged in the West End in 2016.

== Production history ==
Vanities, A New Musical opened at the Pasadena Playhouse, California on August 22, 2008. Music and lyrics were written by David Kirshenbaum, and the book by Jack Heifner with direction by Judith Ivey and choreography by Dan Knechtges. Lauren Kennedy (as Mary), Sarah Stiles (as Joanne) and Anneliese van der Pol (as Kathy) played the three former Texas cheerleaders. Prior to the Pasadena production, the musical was originally produced at TheatreWorks in Palo Alto, California from June–July 2006, directed by Gordon Greenberg, which won the Bay Area Theatre Critics Circle Award for Best Production. The Palo Alto production starred Leslie Kritzer as Kathy, Megan Hilty as Mary, and Stiles as Joanne.

Lauren Kennedy, Sarah Stiles, and Anneliese van der Pol in Vanities.

The musical's original Broadway premiere, scheduled for February 2009 at the Lyceum Theatre, was postponed. Producer Sue Frost stated: "We're a victim of history, and the show will go on, and we are regrouping."

The musical premiered Off-Broadway at Second Stage Theatre on July 2, 2009, in previews, and officially opened on July 16, 2009. Performances continued through August 9, 2009. The original cast starred Anneliese van der Pol as Kathy, Lauren Kennedy as Mary, and Sarah Stiles as Joanne. This was same cast and creative team from the Pasadena Playhouse.

Michael A. Jenkins, producer of the musical, stated that a Broadway run isn't likely but a touring production in late 2010 or early 2011, including a stop at the Majestic Theatre in Dallas, is "quite likely," as is a simultaneous run in London.

On July 6, 2016, it was announced that the show would premiere in the West End of London at Trafalgar Studios, for a limited run from September 6 to October 1, 2016, featuring new material not heard in New York. This production starred Ashleigh Gray as Kathy, Lauren Samuels as Mary and Lizzy Connolly as Joanne. It was directed and choreographed by Racky Plews, and produced by Matt Chisling and Amy Anzel.

== Cast Information ==
Original Off-Broadway Cast

- Kathy - Anneliese van der Pol
- Mary - Lauren Kennedy
- Joanne - Sarah Stiles

2016 West End Cast

- Kathy - Ashleigh Gray
- Mary - Lauren Samuels
- Joanne - Lizzy Connolly

== Plot summary ==
The entire musical takes place in between 1963 and 1990 with the high school scenes taking place in 1963, college scenes taking place in 1968, the penthouse scenes taking place in 1974 and the epilogue taking place in 1990. Three best friends journey through high school, college and their professional life, as they remember all their adventures. Joanne is a sweet, naive southern girl, Mary is very confident and Kathy is the planner. In high school, they are the popular cheerleaders and are planning all the social events. They go to college and plan to live together. They end up all in the same sorority, Kappa Kappa Gamma. Joanne gets married and becomes extremely conservative. Mary opens an art gallery and explores sexual liberation. Kathy ends up living the high life in New York City and reads all the books she was supposed to read in college, "they are so much better than the cliff's notes." They end up fighting when they meet at Kathy's fabulous apartment in New York. Joanne gets drunk in response and talks about how she never has a break from her kids and Ted never lets her drink. However, at a funeral, they all make up and they end as they started, three best friends.

== Musical Numbers ==
2009 Off Broadway
Act I

- Who Am I Today — Kathy, Mary, Joanne
- Hey There, Beautiful — Kathy, Mary, Joanne
- An Organized Life — Kathy, Mary, Joanne
- I Can't Imagine — Kathy, Mary, Joanne

Act II

- I Don't Wanna Hear About It — Kathy, Mary, Joanne
- An Organized Life (Reprise) — Kathy, Mary, Joanne
- Fly Into the Future — Mary
- Cute Boys With Short Haircuts — Kathy
- We're Gonna Be Okay — Kathy, Mary, Joanne
- Let Life Happen — Kathy, Mary, Joanne

Act III

- The Same Old Music — Joanne
- An Organized Life (Reprise) — Kathy, Mary, Joanne
- Friendship Isn't What It Used to Be - Kathy, Mary, Joanne
- Letting Go — Kathy, Mary, Joanne

2016 West End
Act I

- Mystery I — Kathy, Mary, Joanne
- I Don't Wanna Miss a Thing — Kathy, Mary, Joanne
- An Organized Life — Kathy, Mary, Joanne
- I Can't Imagine — Kathy, Mary, Joanne

Act II

- Mystery II — Kathy, Mary, Joanne
- An Organized Life (1968) — Kathy, Mary, Joanne
- Fly Into the Future — Mary
- Cute Boys With Short Haircuts — Kathy
- Let Life Happen — Kathy, Mary, Joanne

Act III

- Mystery III — Kathy, Mary, Joanne
- The Same Old Music — Joanne
- An Organized Life (1974) — Kathy, Mary, Joanne
- Friendship Isn't What It Used to Be - Kathy, Mary, Joanne

Act IV

- Mystery IV — Kathy, Mary, Joanne
- Letting Go — Kathy, Mary, Joanne

== Cast recording ==
Vanities' Cast Recording was released on December 15, 2009, by Sh-K-Boom Records featuring 15 songs from the Off-Broadway production. The CD includes Anneliese van der Pol as Kathy, Lauren Kennedy as Mary, and Sarah Stiles as Joanne.

== Awards and nominations ==
Award	Outcome
StageSceneLA.com Outstanding Achievement in 2008/9
Outstanding Achievement by a Lead Actress (Musical) (Anneliese van der Pol)	Won
