= Todd Duncan =

American baritone (1903–1998)

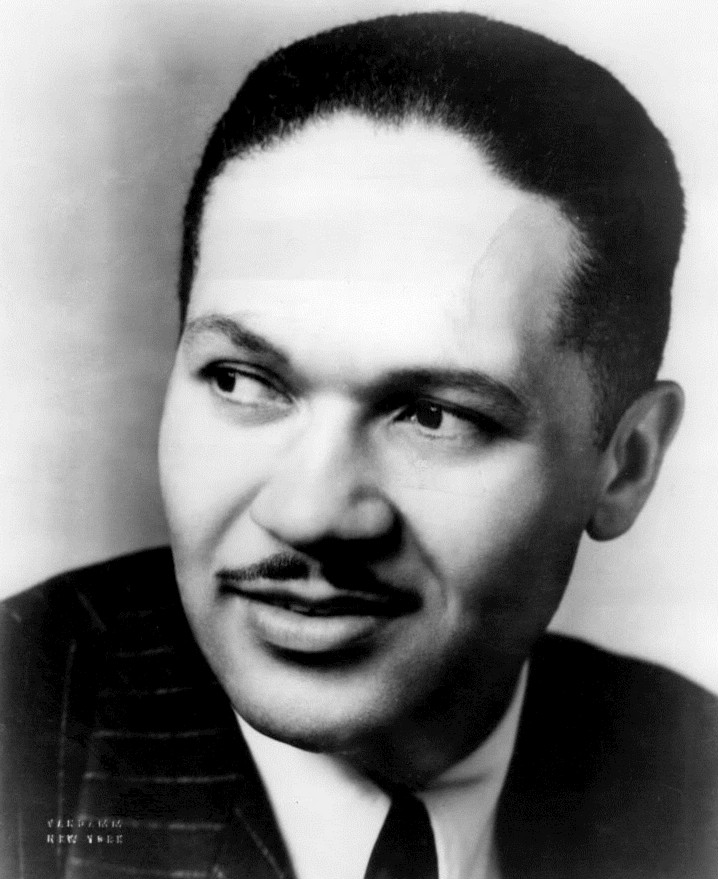
- Todd Duncan, 1954
- Born: February 12, 1903; Danville, Kentucky, U.S.
- Died: February 28, 1998 (aged 95); Washington, D.C., U.S.
- Occupations: Operatic baritone, actor, academic teacher
- Years active: 1933–1983

Robert Todd Duncan (February 12, 1903 – February 28, 1998) was an American baritone opera singer and actor. One of the first Black Americans to sing with a major opera company, Duncan is also noted for appearing as Porgy in the premier production of Porgy and Bess (1935).

== Early life ==
Duncan was born February 12, 1903, in Danville, Kentucky, to John and Lettie (Cooper) Duncan. They were married in Danville 1901, he being born in Danville, and she born in Frankfort. John was a garage owner and Lettie was a music teacher. He obtained his musical training at Butler University in Indianapolis with a B.A. in music followed by an M.A. from Columbia University Teachers College.

== Career ==
In 1934, Duncan debuted in Pietro Mascagni's Cavalleria rusticana at the Mecca Temple in New York with the Aeolian Opera, a black opera company. While working in New York he studied singing privately with Sidney Dietch.

Duncan was George Gershwin's personal choice as the first performer of the role of Porgy in Porgy and Bess in 1935 and played the role more than 1,800 times. He led the cast during the Washington run of Porgy and Bess at the National Theatre in 1936, to protest the theatre's policy of segregation. Duncan stated that he "would never play in a theater which barred him from purchasing tickets to certain seats because of his race." Eventually management would give into the demands and allow for the first integrated performance at National Theatre. Duncan was also the first performer for the role of Stephen Kumalo in Kurt Weill's Lost in the Stars which opened on Broadway at the Music Box Theatre on October 30, 1949, and closed on July 1, 1950, after 281 performances.

In 1938, Duncan appeared on the London stage at the Theatre Royal, Drury Lane in C.B.Cochran's musical production The Sun Never Sets. The cast included fellow American Adelaide Hall, Leslie Banks, Edna Best and Stewart Granger. The musical was adapted by Pat Wallace and Guy Bolton from various stories written by Edgar Wallace and the show included original music by Cole Porter. Costumes were designed by Elizabeth Haffenden. One of the numbers Duncan sang was 'River God'. After the London run closed, Duncan and Adelaide Hall from the original cast toured Britain with the production. Duncan taught voice at Howard University in Washington, D.C. from 1930 until 1945. While teaching at Howard, he continued touring as a soloist with pianists William Duncan Allen and George Malloy. He had a very successful career as a concert singer with over 2,000 performances in 56 countries and two film roles. He retired from Howard and opened his own voice studio teaching privately and giving periodic recitals.

In 1945, he became the first African American to sing with a major opera company, and the first black person to sing in an opera with an otherwise white cast, when he performed the role of Tonio in Leoncavallo's Pagliacci with the New York City Opera. In the same year he sang the role of Escamillo, the bullfighter, in Bizet's Carmen and performed the song cycle Songs of Glory composed by Dutch-American director Dirk Foch on texts by Joseph Auslander, then Poet Laureate. In 1954, Duncan was the first to record "Unchained Melody", a popular song with music by Alex North and lyrics by Hy Zaret. The recording was made for the soundtrack of the obscure prison film Unchained, in which Duncan also played a minor character. Following Duncan's version, the song went on to become one of the most recorded songs of the 20th century.

In his final interview, Todd Duncan spoke of his love for spirituals: "... spirituals are so deep inside of me, it's difficult for me to find words that are meaningful. Spirituals are a part of whatever I am. When I sing them my being sings them, not my throat.... It is very difficult for me to put into words something that is at the bottom of my very being."

In addition to singing, Duncan was also a voice teacher. Among his notable pupils was operatic bass Philip Booth who was a mainstay at the Metropolitan Opera for two decades.

== Honors and death ==
In 1978, the Washington Performing Arts Society presented his 75th birthday gala. Duncan was awarded the George Peabody Medal of Music from the Peabody Conservatory of Music of Johns Hopkins University in 1984. Other awards he received include a medal of honor from Haiti, an NAACP award, the Donaldson Award, the New York Drama Critics' Award for Lost in the Stars, and honorary doctorates from Valparaiso University and Butler University.

Duncan was a member of Alpha Phi Alpha fraternity.

He died of a heart ailment at his home in Washington, D.C. at the age of 95 on February 28, 1998, and was survived by his wife, Gladys Jackson Duncan, and adopted son, Charles, a successful attorney.

== See also ==
- List of African American firsts

== Sources ==
- The Music of Black Americans: A History. Eileen Southern. W.W. Norton & Company; 3rd edition. ISBN 0-393-97141-4
- "Todd Duncan." Newsmakers 1998, Issue 3. Gale Group, 1998.
- The African American Registry
