= George Malloy =

American musician (1920–2008)

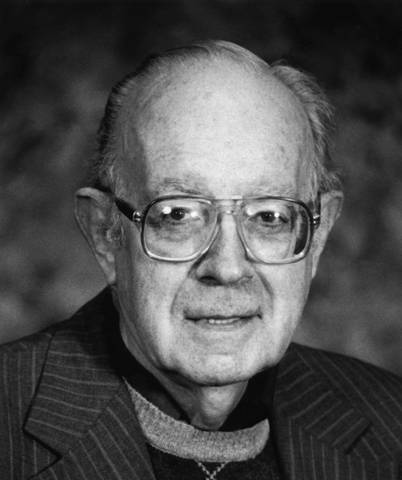
George Malloy, c. 2005

George Malloy (23 June 1920 – 16 March 2008) was an American pianist particularly known for his work as an accompanist from the 1940s to the 1970s. In later decades, he focused on coaching singers and served for 31 years as the accompanist of the charitable New York City theatre group, the Blue Hill Troupe. He was, perhaps, best known for accompanying Camilla Williams in her performance of "The Star-Spangled Banner" immediately before Martin Luther King Jr. delivered his August 1963 "I Have a Dream" speech.

== Life and career ==
Malloy was born in Los Angeles, California. He accompanied recitals for several well-known singers, including Eileen Farrell, Roberta Peters, Martina Arroyo, Elisabeth Söderström, and Todd Duncan, as well as the harmonica player Larry Adler, among many others. His work as an accompanist took him to many important venues, including Carnegie Hall and the White House. He notably accompanied Camilla Williams in her performance of "The Star-Spangled Banner" that preceded Martin Luther King Jr.'s speech "I Have a Dream" at the Lincoln Memorial in 1963 at the March on Washington for Jobs and Freedom. Malloy is heard on film soundtracks.

For the last thirty-one years of his career, Malloy served as accompanist for the Blue Hill Troupe, an amateur theater group based in Manhattan that performs Gilbert and Sullivan shows and musicals for charity. Throughout his career, Malloy maintained a studio in Manhattan, where he coached singers in opera, sacred music, musical theatre and other concert repertoire.

At the age of 83, Malloy recorded an album of classical pieces and standards titled In Between Films. Malloy retired in 2006 and died at the age of 87 in 2008 in Ogden, Utah. His remains were cremated, and his ashes rest at Trinity Church Cemetery and Mausoleum in upper Manhattan.
