= The Ten Commandments: The Musical =

- DVD cover of The Ten Commandments: The Musical starring Adam Lambert and Val Kilmer
- Music: Patrick Leonard
- Lyrics: Maribeth Derry

The Ten Commandments: The Musical is a musical with music by Patrick Leonard and lyrics by Maribeth Derry. The book is adapted from the French musical Les Dix Commandements created by Élie Chouraqui from an idea by Albert Cohen, which in turn was based on the Book of Exodus and the 1956 epic film The Ten Commandments.

The musical debuted at the Kodak Theatre in Hollywood on September 21, 2004. It was directed by Robert Iscove, with choreography by Travis Payne and costumes by Max Azria. The original cast included Val Kilmer, Kevin Earley, Lauren Kennedy, Adam Lambert, Luba Mason, Alisan Porter, Nita Whitaker, Michelle Pereira, Nicholas Rodriguez and Aharon Ipalé. A DVD was shot with the original cast.

== Synopsis ==
=== Act 1 ===
3,300 years ago, under the reign of Egyptian Pharaoh Seti I, the Hebrews were an enslaved race, forced to work mercilessly to meet the demands of Seti's growing empire. Since the increasing population of the Hebrews threatened the Egyptians, the pharaoh handed down an edict sentencing all newborn Hebrew sons to death. The baby Moses, born of Jochebed and Amram, was set adrift on the Nile in a basket, so that his life might be saved. He was found by the daughter of Seti, the childless Princess Bithia, who believed Moses was sent to her by the gods.

Moses was adopted by Seti and raised in the pharaoh's court as a brother to the young prince, Ramses. When the brothers grew to young men, Seti announced that Ramses would become the next pharaoh. Moses would be his second in command, the architect of his cities, and his lifetime chief counselor. Both brothers fervently wished to marry the young princess, Nefertari. Ramses' position as pharaoh forced Nefertari to take him and give up her secret hope of being with Moses, the only man she ever loved.

As time passed, Moses began to question the enslavement of the Hebrews. After witnessing an Egyptian guard abusing a Hebrew, Moses became enraged at the injustices the slaves were suffering, and impulsively killed the guard. During his murder trial, Moses' real sister Miriam revealed to Moses that he was actually the son of Jochebed, a Hebrew slave. Moses was banished to the desert and fled to Midian, where he met and married Zipporah, the daughter of the Midianite priest.

One day in the wilderness, Moses saw a bush that was burning but was not consumed by the flames. From it came the voice of God, instructing him to return to Egypt and demand that Ramses free the Hebrew slaves. Moses, armed only with his shepherd's staff but inspired by the power of God, undertook the mission to lead the Hebrews to "a promised land, a land overflowing with milk and honey". Moses returned to Egypt to confront the pharaoh.

Back in Egypt, the brutality of Ramses' treatment of the slaves only strengthened Moses' resolve. Ramses was overjoyed at the return of his brother until Moses told him that he must let the Hebrews go, explaining to him that no man has the right to enslave another man. Enraged by Moses' plea, Ramses threatened to kill the slaves. In response, Moses unleashed ten plagues on the Kingdom of the Pharaoh; the last one resulted in the death of Ramses’ own son. Devastated, Ramses finally freed the slaves.

=== Act 2 ===
The Hebrews hastily began their trek into the desert, where they wandered, fed by manna and guided by pillars of smoke and fire. Driven by vengeance and Nefertari's goading, Ramses sent his armies to overtake the escaped slaves. The Hebrews, trapped on high cliffs overlooking the Red Sea, began to panic, but Moses urged them to have faith. As he raised his staff, the sea parted, opening a pathway for their escape. The Egyptian soldiers tried to follow, but the sea closed, drowning them.

Wandering in the desert, the Hebrews became discontented and afraid. Moses left the group at the base of Mt. Sinai while he ascended to the peak to seek God's help. There he received The Ten Commandments, a basic law of human conduct. He brought the commandments back to his people, only to find that they had descended into idolatry and sin. Enraged and disappointed, he broke the law tablets and threatened that God would punish the Hebrews. The people repented, accepted the new law, and thus prepared to enter The Promised Land.

== Principal roles ==
Hebrews

- Moses is the third child of Jochebed, after Miriam and Aaron. He is adopted by Bithia, daughter of Pharaoh Seti I.
- Jochebed, wife of Amram, is the mother of Moses, Aaron, and Miriam.
- Joshua is a Hebrew slave and a stonecutter. Before dying, Moses chooses Joshua to lead the Hebrews into The Promised Land.
- Miriam is Moses' sister, helped Jochebed hide the baby Moses in a basket when the Pharaoh sought to kill him.
- Aaron is Moses' older brother. He is designated as the first high priest and takes care of the Ark of the Covenant that contains the tablets of the law.
- Zipporah is one of the seven daughters of the shepherd Jethro. She marries Moses. Together they have two sons. She converts to the Hebrew religion.

Egyptians

- Ramses, the Prince of Egypt, is raised together with Moses. However, once he becomes pharaoh, he turns against the Hebrews and consigns them to merciless slavery. He marries Moses' love, Princess Nefertari.
- Nefertari is an Egyptian princess who was forced to marry Ramses and manipulates the pharaoh.
- Seti I, the pharaoh of Egypt, raises Moses with his own son, Ramses, as a prince of Egypt.
- Bithia is an Egyptian princess, the daughter of Seti, who discovers Moses by the Nile. She follows him into the desert with the Hebrews.

== Musical numbers ==
Act 1

- Seti's command – Seti, Soldiers, Hebrew Slaves
- If I can let you go – Jochebed, Bithia
- Drawn from the water (Naming ceremony) – Bithia and the Royal Court
- When we rule the world – Moses, Ramses, Nefertari, Guards
- A love that never was – Nefertari, Moses
- Keys to the Kingdom – Moses
- Is anybody listening? – Joshua, Hebrew Slaves
- Guilty (the trial)/If I Can Let You Go (Reprise) – Jochebed, Bithia, Miriam, Moses, Ramses and The Company
- Drawn from the Water (reprise)
- The Horns of Jericho – Moses, Joshua, Miriam, Jochebed, Hebrew Slaves
- A Shadow Falls Across this House – Nefertari, Ramses, Bithia, The Royal Court
- The one – Zipporah
- Bedouin dance – The Company
- Rain down stars (a wedding blessing) – Zipporah, Zipporah's Sister, Ensemble
- A love that never was (reprise) – Nefertari
- Why me? – Moses
- The Horns of Jericho (reprise) – Zipporah, Aaron
- Glory of Ra – Ramses
- Let them go (no man's right) – Moses, Ramses, Joshua, Aaron, Hebrew Slaves
- The plagues – Moses, Ramses, Nefertari, Joshua, Jochebed, Miriam, Aaron, Viziers, Hebrew Slaves and Egyptians

Act 2

- We Are Free/Light of a new day – Miriam, Joshua, Aaron, Hebrews
- Across the desert – Hebrews
- Can you do that for me? – Nefertari
- Glory of Ra (reprise) – Ramses
- Into the deep – Moses, Joshua, Aaron, Nahshson, Hebrews
- Brother's still (how can it be?) – Ramses, Moses
- Where We Belong – Zipporah, Bithia, Jochebed
- Back in Egypt – Hebrews
- Back in Egypt – Moses
- Land of milk and honey – Aaron, Hebrews
- Golden calf – Hebrews
- Why me (reprise) – Moses
- The ten – Solo Child, Hebrews
- A prayer for life – Moses, Hebrews
- Encore – The Company

== Original cast ==
Role	Actor
Seti	Aharon Ipalé
Jochebed	Michelle Pereira
Miriam	Alisan Porter
Bithia	Luba Mason
Aaron	Nicholas Rodriguez
Moses	Val Kilmer
Ramses	Kevin Earley
Nefertari	Lauren Kennedy
Joshua	Adam Lambert
Zipporah	Nita Whitaker
Moses’ Son	Graham Phillips (actor)

== Critical response ==
The musical received mixed reviews from theatre critics, but the actors earned nearly unanimous praise for their performances.

Adam Lambert's fame on American Idol had led DVD releases to feature his name on covers.
