= William Derrough =

American investment banker

William "Bill" Derrough

Treasurer of the Democratic National Committee
- In office February 25, 2017 – January 20, 2021
- Preceded by: Andrew Tobias
- Succeeded by: Virginia McGregor

Personal details
- Born: January 24, 1965 (age 61) San Francisco, California, U.S.
- Spouse: Alvaro Salas
- Education: University of California, Berkeley (BA)
- Occupation: Investment Banker; Treasurer of the DNC

William Quesada "Bill" Derrough (born January 24, 1965) is an American investment banker and chairman of Jefferies global Restructuring group. He was previously Co-Head of the Capital Structure Advisory Group (which includes Recapitalization and Restructuring) at Moelis & Company, a NYSE exchange-listed global investment banking firm founded in 2007. A member of the Democratic Party, he served as Treasurer of the Democratic National Committee (DNC) from 2017-2020.

== Early life and education ==
Derrough was born in San Francisco, California. He is the son of Graciela Yllescas Derrough and Joseph Hoge Derrough. His mother moved to California from Guatemala in the 1950s and became a licensed home day care operator and later, a teacher’s aide in public schools in Novato, California. Derrough’s father worked for 35 years as a union carpenter in Marin County, California. Prior to becoming a carpenter, Derrough’s father was a tuna fisherman. Derrough’s father volunteered for the U.S. Navy in the aftermath of the Pearl Harbor attacks of December 7, 1941. He became a Torpedoman Mate after basic training and then volunteered for the Navy’s fledgling Patrol Torpedo Boat service. After intensive training aboard PT boats in Naragansett Bay, Derrough’s father served aboard PT 117 and PT 61 in the South Pacific, mostly in the Solomon Islands, where he saw significant action as the PT boats were the only line of defense against the Japanese in that part of the pacific for several years. Derrough’s father was aboard PT 117 when it was hit by a bomb from a Japanese plane at PT base Redova.

Derrough attended public schools in Novato, California and achieved the rank of Eagle Scout, scouting's highest attainable rank, in 1980 at the age of 15. He received a four-year Navy ROTC college scholarship and was a midshipman in the United States Navy Reserve from 1983 until 1986. He served on active duty during the summers of 1984, 1985 and 1986, stationed at naval bases Pearl Harbor (HI), Coronado (CA) and San Diego (CA), respectively. He was prevented from receiving his officer's commission as a result of the U.S. Military's then ban on LGBT service members.

Derrough received a Bachelor of Arts in Soviet Studies from the University of California, Berkeley.

== Career ==
Derrough began his investment banking career at Salomon Brothers as an analyst in corporate finance in 1989. In 1991 he joined Chanin & Company, a boutique specialty investment banking firm in Los Angeles, where he spent seven years advising financially distressed businesses. Derrough was a principal at Doyle & Boissiere, a private equity firm in San Francisco, from 1997-1998. In 1998, he joined Jefferies & Company to launch its Recapitalization & Restructuring business.

Derrough and Thane W. Carlston joined Moelis & Company to start its Recapitalization & Restructuring business in July, 2008. Under their leadership, Moelis’ Recapitalization & Restructuring team has executed over 500 engagements representing over $1 trillion in transaction value and was named Restructuring Firm of the Year in 2019 and 2014 by London-based International Financing Review magazine. Derrough currently is Global Co-Head of Moelis’ Capital Structure Advisory business which assists large corporate and governmental entries address liability-driven challenges.

Over his career he has advised companies, governments, labor unions and non-profits on hundreds of transformational transactions involving new debt and equity financing, debt adjustment, rescheduling and restructuring, debt-to-equity conversions and mergers and acquisitions. He has served as an expert witness on various valuation and financial instrument matters in a number of Federal and State court litigations.

Among other notable transactions, Derrough was the lead banker to the Official Creditors Committee of American Airlines during its bankruptcy from 2012-2014 and was instrumental in helping drive the re-organization which involved a merger with US Airways. In April 2020, Derrough became lead investment banker to The Hertz Corporation after its suffered revenue losses of over 75% due to COVID-19. His team helped Hertz raise over $20 billion in debt and equity capital to maintain liquidity throughout the most severe COVID period and to help Hertz pay off all of its creditors at 100 cents on the dollar. The Hertz Plan of Reorganization allowed the company to emerge from Chapter 11 with significantly less debt than prior to COVID-19, significantly better liquidity position and the delivery of over $1 billion in value to its shareholders. Over the period of March 2020 until the end of 2021, Moelis assisted companies and governmental entities raise over $150 billion in debt and equity capital.

== Democratic National Committee ==
Derrough was elected to a four-year term as Treasurer of the Democratic National on February 25, 2017 along with newly elected Chair Tom Perez, and was tasked with restructuring operations of the DNC. Derrough’s principal areas of focus included updating the DNC’s internal finance, audit and accounting functions, improving relationships with its key lender and improving the transparency of DNC finances to its 447 voting members.

During this period, the DNC successfully rebuilt its operations, especially its data and tech and its state-level organization and mobilization capabilities, to support Democratic candidates running for office at all levels “up and down the ticket”. These efforts helped lead to successful electoral victories in November 2017 in Virginia and New Jersey gubernatorial and state legislative races and the December 2017 United States Senate special election in Alabama. Democrats gained control of the U.S. House of Representatives in November 2018.

In August 2020, the Democratic National Committee nominated Joseph R. Biden, Jr. as its nominee for President of the United States and Kamala D. Harris as its nominee for Vice President. Biden and Harris defeated incumbents Donald J. Trump and Michael Pence on November 6, 2020, winning more votes than any national ticket in history. As part of the 2020 presidential election process, the DNC raised $493 million, more than any year in its history. The previous record of $372 million was set in 2016 when Hillary Clinton was the nominee. The DNC ended the year with more cash on hand than at any time in its previous history. Derrough was named a top fundraiser for the Biden campaign in a campaign statement in November 2020.

Derrough did not stand for re-election in January 2021 and was succeeded by Virginia McGregor.

== Other affiliations and recognitions ==
Derrough has been active in a number of local and national non-profit organizations focused on education, underprivileged youth, civil rights and Roman Catholic Church charities and has helped raise funds for hundreds of Democratic candidates running for office. He has served on the boards of Lambda Legal, Maitri, National Pastoral Life Center, Boy Scouts of Greater New York, Bennington College, Youth, Inc., Academy of St. Joseph, among others.

Derrough was awarded the John C. Whitehead Good Scout Award by the Boy Scouts of Greater New York in 2015. Derrough was named a Distinguished Eagle Scout by the National Eagle Scout Association of the Boy Scouts of America in 2019. On September 21, 2021, Derrough received the St. Francis Service Award from the Catholic Renewal group of Catholic Charities of New York. The St. Francis Service Award recognizes members of the restructuring community who, regardless of creed, have demonstrated a standard of integrity, humility and charity that warrants the acclaim of their peers. Derrough co-founded Catholic Renewal in 2010 to help raise money amongst the corporate restructuring community of New York to support Catholic Charities’ work to feed and care for the neediest New Yorkers. Since its inception, Catholic Renewal has raised over $10 million for Catholic Charities of New York.

Derrough was a member of the Board of Directors of the American Bankruptcy Institute from 2005-2010 and was inducted as a Fellow of the American College of Bankruptcy in 2007. He is a frequent speaker at financial and legal industry conferences and has served on the faculty for the Federal Judicial Center’s financial literacy programs since 1999.

== Personal life ==
Derrough was married to Alvaro G. Salas on September 15, 2008 (during the five-month “gap period” after California’s Supreme Court allowed same-sex marriage) in a civil ceremony at San Francisco City Hall officiated by former San Francisco Mayor Willie Brown. They live in Brooklyn, New York and have two children.
