= Ring of Fire (musical) =

Jukebox musical based on the music of Johnny Cash

- Music: Johnny Cash
- Productions: 2006 Broadway

Ring of Fire is a jukebox musical based on the music of Johnny Cash.

== Productions ==
Ring of Fire was conceived by William Meade and created and directed by Richard Maltby, Jr. The musical played a "discreet and well-reviewed test run at Buffalo's Studio Arena Theatre in fall 2005".

The musical contains 38 of Johnny Cash's songs, such as "Country Boy," "A Thing Called Love," "Five Feet High and Rising," "Daddy Sang Bass," "Ring of Fire," "I Walk the Line," "I've Been Everywhere," "The Man in Black" and "Hurt."

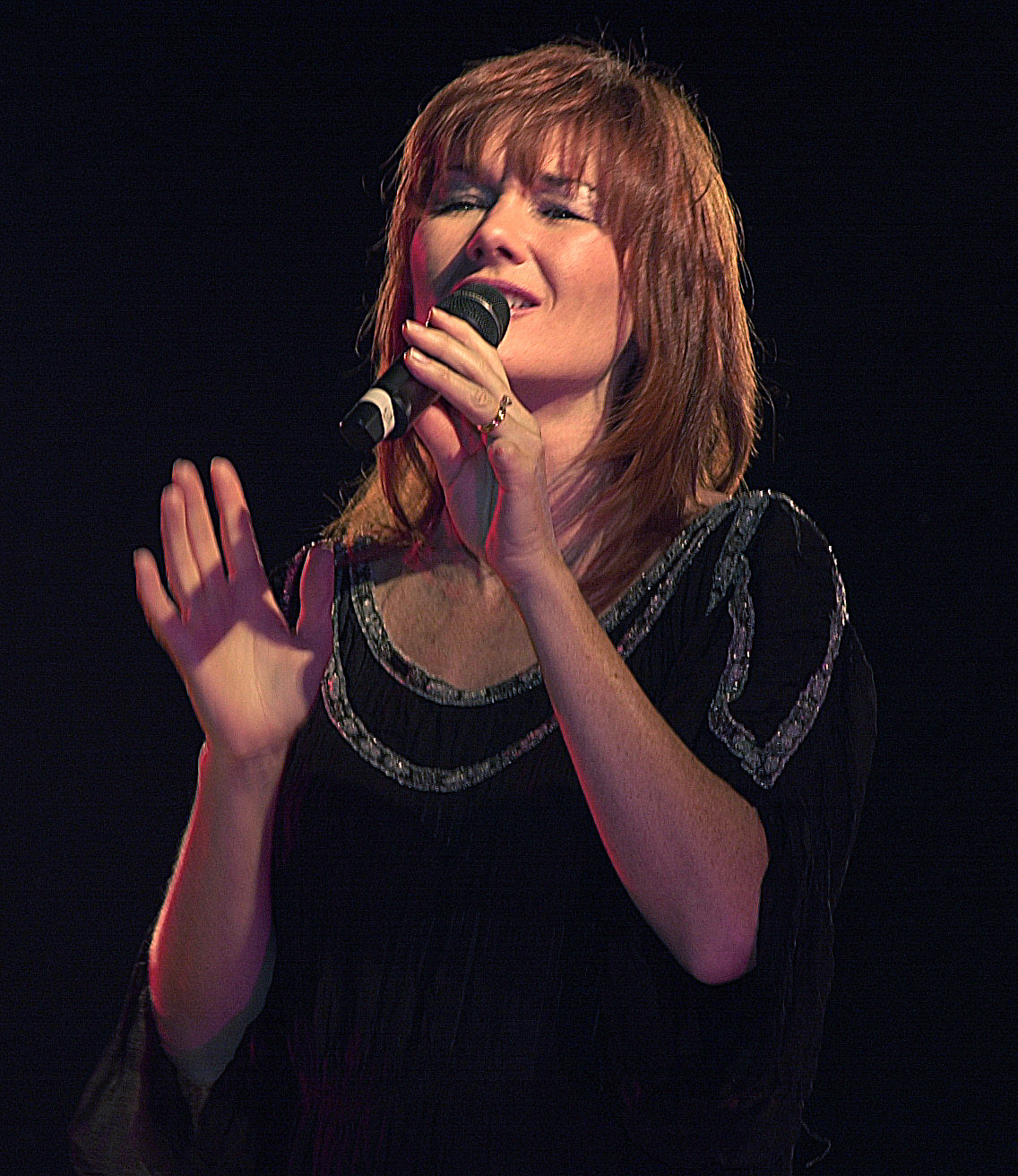
Lari White, 2002

The musical opened on Broadway at the Ethel Barrymore Theatre on March 12, 2006. The show has six principal performers paired as three couples: young, middle-aged and older. The cast featured Beth Malone and Jarrod Emick; Lari White and Jeb Brown; and Jason Edwards and Cass Morgan. Maltby said of the concept: "The couples progress through life. If you know Johnny Cash's story you can see the contours of his biography in the show. But it's not only his story. A lot of people have said to me that they saw their own life in the show, which I think is true, too." Due to mixed reviews and critical reception, as well as low ticket sales, the musical closed on April 30, 2006 after 57 performances and 38 previews.

The musical was produced at the Charlottetown Festival, Prince Edward Island, in June 2012.

A "reconceived" version of the musical was presented at the Milwaukee Repertory Theater, Milwaukee, Wisconsin, in March 2013, created and directed by Maltby. This version had five cast members, including Eddie Clendening.

== Critical response ==
Ben Brantley, in his review for The New York Times, wrote: "Though Mr. Cash,...is not himself a character in this latest entry in the jukebox musical sweepstakes of Broadway, his spirit is invoked as a friendly ghost with dimples and a twinkling disposition. In other words, Ring of Fire, which opened last night at the Ethel Barrymore Theater, has little to do with the dark, troubled and excitingly dangerous presence that most people remember as Johnny Cash... In form, Ring of Fire hovers between the usual singalong and storybook styles. Using songs recorded by Mr. Cash between 1955 and 2002 (many of them written by other composers), the show follows a sort of ages-of-man path from green country-boy idealism into the sloughs of a hard-living musician's disillusionment and on up to the mountains of spiritual redemption... Certainly, I was aware of missing someone as I was watching Ring of Fire. Too bad that person happened to be Johnny Cash."

Many felt the failure was due to the show being booked into a theatre that was too large for the intimacy of the show.
