= The Only Investment Guide You'll Ever Need =

Non-fiction work by Andrew Tobias

- First edition
- Author: Andrew Tobias
- Subject: Personal finance, personal investing
- Published: 1978 Harcourt Brace Jovanovich; 1979 Bantam Books; 1983 Bantam Books; 1987 Bantam Books; 1996 Harcourt Brace; 1998 Harcourt Brace; 2002 Harcourt (publisher); 2005 Harcourt; 2010 Mariner Books/Houghton Mifflin Harcourt; 2016 Mariner Books/Houghton Mifflin Harcourt
- Publication place: United States
- Pages: 163
- ISBN: 9780151699414
- OCLC: 3379935
- Dewey Decimal: 332.67 T629o
- LC Class: HG4521.T6

The Only Investment Guide You'll Ever Need is a financial guide written by Andrew Tobias that was originally published in 1978. The book includes advice on topics such as savings, investments, and preparing for retirement. A 2004 Publishers Weekly article described the book as million-selling, noting that Harcourt had stood behind it for 25 years.

== Critical reception ==
In a 2016 New York Times column, Paul B. Brown wrote that the book, continually updated since 1978, "covers a great deal of important territory, although some of the advice by now may sound familiar," and that Tobias "combines humor … with common sense presented in an uncommon way."

== See also ==
- The Invisible Bankers: Everything the Insurance Industry Never Wanted You to Know (book)
