= L.A. Firefighters =

American drama television series

- Genre: Drama
- Created by: Gordon Greisman
- Starring: Jarrod Emick; Christine Elise; Alexandra Hedison; Elizabeth Mitchell; Miguel Sandoval; Brian Smiar; Carlton Wilborn; Brian Leckner
- Theme music composer: Russ Landau
- Country of origin: United States
- Original language: English
- No. of seasons: 1
- No. of episodes: 13 (7 unaired)

Production
- Executive producer: Gordon Greisman
- Running time: 44 minutes
- Production companies: Papazian/Hirsch Entertainment; Calgary Lane Productions; 20th Century Fox Television

Original release
- Network: Fox
- Release: June 3 – July 8, 1996

L.A. Firefighters, also known as Fire Co. 132, is an American drama television series starring Jarrod Emick. The series premiered June 3, 1996, on Fox.

== Cast ==
- Jarrod Emick as Captain Jack Malloy
- Christine Elise as Firefighter Erin Coffey
- Rob Youngblood as Pilot Jed Neal
- Brian Smiar as Fire Chief Dick Coffey, Erin's Father
- Alexandra Hedison as Firefighter Kay Rizzo
- Brian Leckner as Firefighter J.B. Baker
- Carlton Wilborn as Firefighter Ray Grimes
- Elizabeth Mitchell as Jack Malloy's Wife, Laura
- Miguel Sandoval as Fire Marshal Bernie Ramirez
- Alexandra Paul as Firefighter T.K. Martin

== Production ==
After the initial six-episode summer run, the series was retitled and given new cast members. Criticism of the show from the L.A. County Fire Fighters Union led to the series being retitled Fire Co. 132. The retooled series never aired.

== Episodes ==
Thirteen episodes are registered with the United States Copyright Office.

=== L.A. Firefighters ===
No.	Title	Directed by	Written by	Original release date	Prod. code
1	"Pilot"	Unknown	Gordon Greisman	June 3, 1996	3B01
2	"Till Death Do Us Part"	Unknown	Gordon Greisman	June 10, 1996	3B02
3	"It's a Family Affair"	Unknown	Randy Anderson	June 17, 1996	3B03
4	"The Fire Down Below"	Thomas J. Wright	Randy Anderson	June 24, 1996	3B04
5	"Curiouser and Curiouser"	Randall Zisk	Ann Lewis Hamilton	July 1, 1996	3B05
6	"A Mad Tea Party"	Unknown	Unknown	July 8, 1996	3B06

=== Fire Co. 132 ===
Title	Written by	Prod. code
"So What Else Happened?"	TBA	4B01
"The Big One"	TBA	4B02
"Love Me Do"	Karl Holman	4B03
"The Match"	Gary Glasberg	4B04
"Deadly Cargo"	Robert Zappia	4B05
"Fuel & Spark"	TBA	4B06
"Twenty Devils"	Karl Holman	4B07
