= Mopco Improv Theatre =

Venue in New York, US

Coordinates: 42.8166°N 73.9384°W

- The Mop and Bucket Company
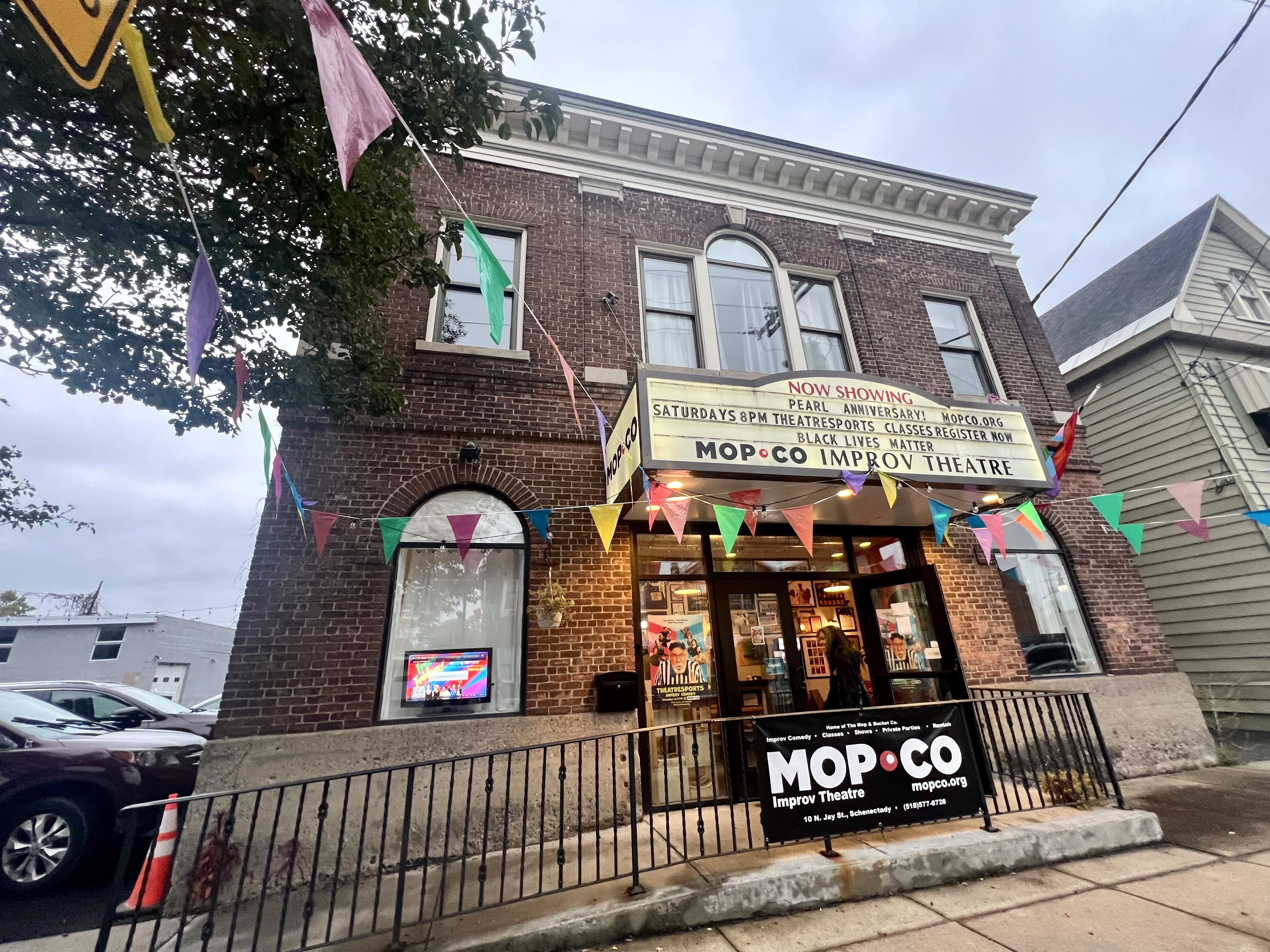
- Mopco Theatre
- Formation: 1995; 31 years ago
- Type: Improvisational comedy, theatre, variety shows
- Location: 10 N. Jay St., Schenectady, NY
- Artistic director: Michael Burns
- Website: Mopco.org

The Mopco Improv Theatre (Mopco) is a improvisational theater venue and improv training center in Schenectady, New York that opened in 2016. Located in a former firehouse in downtown Schenectady, it is the home of The Mop and Bucket Company, an improvisational theatre troupe formed in 1995 by Mopco Artistic Director Michael Burns.

The theatre presents many short and long-form improv comedy formats including Theatresports competitions and Spontaneous Broadway, which was created by Mopco co-owner Kat Koppett. They also offer improv classes, corporate workshops, and private entertainment, as well as in-school programs. They present guest artists under their Mopco Presents banner and occasionally host outside theatre groups.

== History ==
Michael Burns began by teaching improv classes in the back of a karate studio and his troupe performed at many other venues in the Capital District such as bars, libraries, and cafes before landing a show at Caffé Lena in Saratoga Springs. In 2008, The Mop and Bucket company began a long-term engagement performing at Proctor's Theater, and the company remained there until they purchased their current space in 2016.

The building was originally a firehouse, and then became a strip club which was closed down in 1997. The building remained unoccupied until it was purchased and renovated to become the Mopco theatre.

The Mopco is also the headquarters of Koppett, an applied improvisation consultancy founded in 2001 by author and improv pioneer Kat Koppett, winner of NASAGA’s Ifill-Raynolds Lifetime Achievement Award for her contributions to experiential learning.

In 2018, Amy Schumer called the Mopco to request a night to test new material, and it sold out within minutes of being announced online. Schumer stipulated that any proceeds from her Mopco show should go to charity.

In June and July of 2026, the theatre hosted the Actorvists Takeover, a multi-day event focusing on art and activism which featured a comedy benefit, a collaboration with Art Night Schenectady, and more community-focused offerings.

In October 2026 Mopco received press for celebrating a decade since opening their own theatre.

== See also ==
- Improvisational theatre
- List of improvisational theatre companies
