= North Carolina Theatre =

Theatre company in Raleigh, North Carolina

Coordinates: 35.7713°N 78.6396°W

North Carolina Theatre was a professional theatre located in Raleigh, North Carolina. They performed four mainstage shows each year at Raleigh Memorial Auditorium and the A.J. Fletcher Opera Theatre in the Martin Marietta Center for the Performing Arts. Founded by De Ann Jones in 1984, the Theater launched the career of Clay Aiken, Lauren Kennedy, Sharon Lawrence, Beth Leavel, and Terrence Mann.

In February 2024, the North Carolina Theatre filed for Chapter 11 bankruptcy and announced that they would suspend operations for the 2024 season. The Theater subsequently determined that it could not complete a reorganization under Chapter 11 and liquidated in 2025.
