= Spontaneous Broadway =

Spontaneous Broadway is an advanced long-form improvised performance, based on audience suggestions. The audience typically submits titles of songs that have never been written, and the performers choose suggestions to create songs, the audience votes through acclamation on their favorite song, which is then used as the core of a brand new Broadway musical.

== About ==
Though not required or necessarily encouraged by improv professionals, elements of humor inevitably surface in the performance because of the surprising and playful nature of improvisation and its use of typical Broadway stereotypes. The performers' songs are supported by an onstage musician or band that improvises the music, generally in the style of typical show tunes.

== History ==
The format was created in New York City at Freestyle Repertory Theatre and has been performed by a number of different companies around the US. The show received a favorable review from The New York Times when it premiered in New York in 1995.

The Spontaneous Broadway format was created by Kat Koppett in association with Freestyle Repertory Theatre in New York. Koppett is a 25-year improv veteran, having worked with Freestyle Repertory Theatre and San Francisco's BATS Improv. She is currently co-owner at Mopco, an improv troupe and theatre based in the Capital District of New York State. Koppett also runs an applied improvisation consulting business, eponymously named Koppett. In 1995, TheaterWeek Magazine named Kat one of the year's "Unsung Heroes" for her creation of Spontaneous Broadway, which is now performed regularly by teams of actors all over the world. Significant contributions to the development of the format were made by Kenn Adams, Laura Livingston, and Samuel D. Cohen.

At the 2000 Melbourne Fringe Festival, the show began its life in Australia and immediately won a special Fringe Award. Produced by musical director John Thorn (who secured the Australian licence from Kat Koppett) and hosted by Russell Fletcher, many of Australia's finest comic improvisors have since performed the show around the country, including sell-out performances at the Sydney Opera House, The Famous Spiegeltent, and at the Melbourne International Comedy Festival, receiving rave reviews and legions of repeat attendee fans.

Currently, it is performed by BATS theatre in San Francisco, The Mopco Improv Theatre in Schenectady NY, and at several colleges around the country, including Stanford.

In spring 2026, Mopco Improv Theatre presented a limited engagement of Spontaneous Broadway and the run was extended due to high demand.
