= Andrew Tobias =

American writer (born 1947)

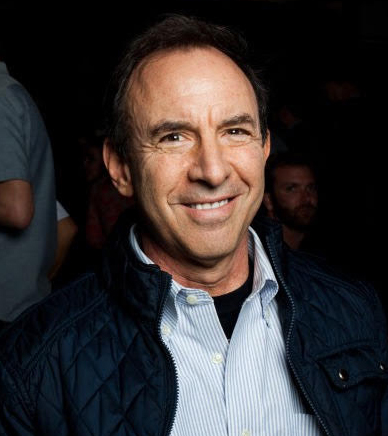
- Andrew Tobias in 2016

Treasurer of the Democratic National Committee
- In office January 23, 1999 – February 25, 2017
- Preceded by: Carol Pensky
- Succeeded by: William Derrough

Personal details
- Born: April 20, 1947 (age 79)
- Party: Democratic
- Education: Harvard University
- Occupation: Author
- Website: andrewtobias.com

Andrew Tobias (born April 20, 1947) is an American writer. He has written extensively about investment, as well as politics, insurance, and other topics. He is also known for writing The Best Little Boy in the World, a 1973 memoir – originally pseudonymous – about life as a gay man. From 1999 until 2017, he was treasurer of the Democratic National Committee.

== Education ==
Tobias graduated from Harvard College in 1968 with a BA in Slavic languages and literatures. In 1972, he obtained his Master of Business Administration degree from Harvard Business School.

== Writing ==
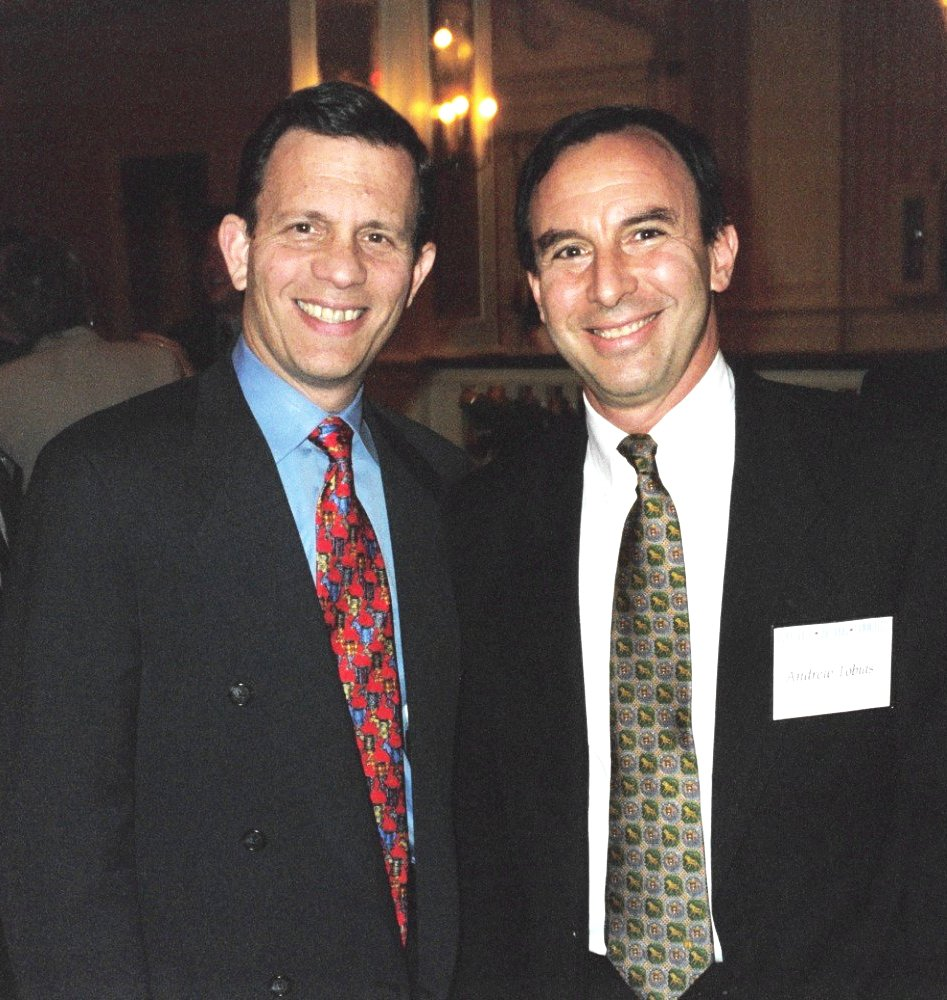
Tobias (right) in 1999

Andrew Tobias first book was The Funny Money Game about his experience as a recent Harvard graduate and a Vice President of National Student Marketing Corporation.

While in business school, he wrote for New York Magazine, and after graduation became a contributing editor.

In 1973, Tobias wrote The Best Little Boy in the World, an autobiography in which he spoke of his experiences as a gay boy and young man. He published it under the pen name "John Reid" to avoid the repercussions of being openly gay, though the book was republished in 1998 under his real name, to coincide with a sequel, The Best Little Boy in the World Grows Up.

Although he has never held a job in the investment industry, he has written extensively on the subject, including The Only Investment Guide You'll Ever Need, The Only Other Investment Guide You'll Ever Need, My Vast Fortune, Money Angles, The Invisible Bankers: Everything the Insurance Industry Never Wanted You to Know, and The Funny Money Game. He parlayed his writings and advice into success in the software industry with Andrew Tobias's Managing Your Money financial application.

Tobias has written books on other topics, which include Fire and Ice: The Charles Revson/Revlon Story, Getting By on $100,000 a Year, a collection of magazine pieces; Auto Insurance Alert, a book proposing radical insurance reform; Kids Say Don't Smoke on the efforts of tobacco companies to sell cigarettes to younger consumers (which was also published in Russian).

After leaving New York Magazine in 1976, he was a contributing editor to Esquire, then Playboy, Time, and Parade.

== Politics ==
In 1999, he became treasurer of the Democratic National Committee.

He spearheaded a ballot initiative to convert California's auto insurance system into a no-fault system which would be paid for through a gasoline surcharge instead of premiums. He wrote a book on the topic. He also funded a large part of the campaign himself.

== Personal life ==
Tobias was the partner of fashion designer and Democratic political activist Charles Nolan, who died on January 30, 2011.

Tobias was grand marshal of the 2005 New York City LGBT Pride parade.

He was president and CEO of Harvard Student Agencies in 1967–68 while residing in Winthrop House.

Tobias was interviewed in Jill Salvino's documentary film Between the Shades.

== Awards ==
- 1984 Gerald Loeb Award for Magazines for a series on personal finance in Playboy.
- 1993 Consumer Federation of America Media Service award
- 1997 GLSEN Valedictorian award
- 1998 Harvard Magazine Smith-Weld prize
