= Beth Malone =

American actress and singer (born 1969)

- Malone in 2026
- Born: Elizabeth Ann Malone; January 2, 1969 (age 57); Auburn, Nebraska, U.S.
- Occupations: Actress; singer
- Years active: since 2002
- Spouse: Rochelle Schoppert

Elizabeth Ann "Beth" Malone (born January 2, 1969) is an American actress and singer known for her work in Broadway, off-Broadway and regional theatre. She originated the role of Alison Bechdel in the musical Fun Home, for which she was nominated for the Tony Award for Best Actress in a Musical.

== Life and education ==
She was born in Auburn, Nebraska, and raised in Castle Rock, Colorado, the daughter of Peggy and Bill Malone. Her mother is a professional country music singer. Malone played the title role in Annie in middle school, and participated in theatre at Douglas County High School. Malone first attended Loretto Heights College for musical theatre. When the school closed in 1989 while she was there, she decided not to continue, because she was successful finding work without a degree. She later completed her degree through the University of Northern Colorado in 1996 and earned an MFA in Acting from UC Irvine in 2000.

She began her career working at the Country Dinner Playhouse at the age of 16. Malone moved to New York City at age 21. After a period of not finding work, she returned to Aspen, Colorado, where she was able to play a wide variety of roles. She received her Equity card performing in a production of Baby. She later moved to Sherman Oaks, Los Angeles, where she began performing in television commercials and performing in shows in Greater Los Angeles. Malone is married to Rochelle Schoppert, a music technician.

=== Activism ===
Malone performs regularly at benefits for LGBTQ groups and nonprofits. She is also involved in organizations that advocate for gender equality, like the Aqua Foundation. When she was performing in Fun Home, she purposefully made time to talk with young people who were struggling with embracing their identities.

== Career ==
Malone made her Broadway debut in Ring of Fire in 2006. She appeared off-Broadway in Bingo: A Winning New Musical at St. Luke's Theatre in 2005. She appeared off-Broadway in The Marvelous Wonderettes at the Westside Theatre as Betty Jean in 2008. She also released her first solo album, Lunch Shift, in 2008.

She played the title role in Annie Get Your Gun in the music circus at the Wells Fargo Pavilion in Sacramento, California in August 2011, and again at the San Diego Musical Theatre in May 2014.

She played the title role in The Unsinkable Molly Brown at Denver Center Theater Company in September and October 2014, as well as in The Muny's production in July 2017. She played the lead in an industry reading in November 2017 at the Roundabout Theatre Company.

Malone originated the role of Alison Bechdel in Fun Home, from workshops to the 2013 off-Broadway production at The Public Theater. She continued the role in the 2015 Broadway production at the Circle in the Square Theatre, which closed on September 10, 2016. Critic Steven Suskin called her performance "the glue that holds the show together." She received a nomination for the Tony Award for Best Actress in a Musical for her performance.

Malone played the Angel in certain performances in the Broadway revival of Tony Kushner's play Angels in America at the Neil Simon Theatre. The limited engagement began previews on February 23, opened on March 25, and closed on July 15, 2018.

=== Beth Malone: So Far... ===
In 2011, Malone created a one-woman cabaret show titled Beth Malone: So Far. The show tells her life story, "from her offbeat childhood in small-town Colorado, to her not-quite-normal entrance into acting, to her left-of-center adult life." Malone describes this production as an "autobiographical tale about what it was like for [her] to be a rural lesbian in the '70s." The one-hour production takes the audience on a journey through her teenage years and young adulthood, highlighting her relationship with her father and how their relationship changed when she came out. Although there are several emotional moments in the show, Malone's presentation is mostly comedic. She has toured with the show in several locations, including Aspen, Colorado, at the Wheeler Opera House in 2011, and in New York City in 2012 at the Davenport Theatre.

== Theatre credits ==
Start year	Production	Role	Notes
2002	You're a Good Man, Charlie Brown	Sally Brown	Colony Theatre
2003	Babes in Arms		Reprise!
2004	Grand Hotel	Flaemmchen	Colony Theatre
2005	A New Brain	Ensemble	Reprise!
2005	Bingo: A Winning New Musical	Alison	Off-Broadway
2006	Ring of Fire		Broadway; March 12 – April 30, 2006
2006	Sister Act	Sister Mary Robert	Pasadena Playhouse
2007	Sister Act	Sister Mary Robert	Alliance Theatre
2008	The Marvelous Wonderettes	Betty Jean	Off-Broadway
2010	The Marvelous Wonderettes	Betty Jean	Musical Theatre West
2011	Annie Get Your Gun	Annie Oakley	Wells Fargo Pavilion
2011	Beth Malone: So Far	Self	National tour; 2011/12
2013	9 to 5	Judy Bernly	3-D Theatricals
2013	Fun Home	Alison Bechdel	Off-Broadway; September 20, 2013 – January 12, 2014
2014	Annie Get Your Gun	Annie Oakley	San Diego Musical Theatre; May 2014
2014	The Unsinkable Molly Brown	Molly Brown	Denver Center Theatre Company; September – October 2014
2015	Fun Home	Alison Bechdel	Broadway; April 19, 2015 – September 10, 2016
2018	Angels in America	The Angel/Mormon Mother/Emily	Broadway; March 25 – July 15, 2018
2020	The Unsinkable Molly Brown	Molly Brown	Off-Broadway
2025	Dolly: A True Original Musical	Judy Ogle	Regional, Belmont University
2026	Good Time Charlie	Janice	Off-Broadway, Public Theater

== Filmography ==
Film
Start year	Production	Role	Notes
2006	Room 101		Short
2009	Intelligent Life: Change Your Mind, Change Your World	Narrator	Documentary
2011	Hick	Sherri	
2016	The Comedian	Carol Bock	
2017	Between the Shades	Herself	Documentary
2019	Brittany Runs a Marathon	Tesla	
2021	The God Committee	Attorney	
2021	Tick, Tick... Boom!	"Sunday" Legend #6	
2025	Alma and the Wolf	Betty	
2025	Song Sung Blue	Bridget	

Television
Start year	Production	Role	Notes
2003	One Minute Soap Opera	Various	Series regular
Unknown	What's On	Host	TV Guide Channel
2004	Judging Amy	Marge Bolton/Kelly McClaren	2 episodes
2005	Reno 911!	Ms. Striker	Episode: "The Prefect of Wanganui"
2015	Late Night with Seth Meyers	Self/Alison Bechdel	Episode: "Ed Helms/Alison Bechdel/Fun Home/Brad Wilk"
2015	The Good Wife	Pro-Life Activist	Episode: "Restraint"
2016	BrainDead	Claudia Monarch	8 episodes
2017	Bull	Tessa Snyder	Episode: "The Devil, The Detail"
2019	Bluff City Law	Samantha	Episode: "The All-American"
2019	Law & Order: Special Victims Unit	Doctor	Episode: "We Dream of Machine Elves"
2020	The Baker and the Beauty	Melanie Caan	2 episodes
2021	All Rise	Sylvia Arthur	Episode: "Caught Up in Circles"
2022	The Blacklist	FBI Agent Aronson	Episode: Helen Maghi (No. 172)
2022	Five Days at Memorial	Linda Schafer	3 episodes
2022	Gaslit	Maria	Episode: "Honeymoon"
2023	Chicago Med	Deanna Brooks	Episode: "Those Times You Have to Cross the Line"
2023	City on Fire	Felicia	Main role; 8 episodes
2024	Chicago P.D.	Diane Harrison	Episode: "Off Switch"

== Awards and nominations ==
Year	Award	Category	Nominated Work	Result
2002	Ovation Award	Best Featured Actress in a Musical	You're a Good Man, Charlie Brown	Nominated
2013	Ovation Award	Best Lead Actress in a Musical	Seven Brides for Seven Brothers	Won
2015	Henry Award	Outstanding Actress in a Musical	The Unsinkable Molly Brown	Won
2015	Tony Award	Best Actress in a Musical	Fun Home	Nominated
2016	Grammy Award	Best Musical Theater Album	Fun Home	Nominated
