= Martin Mayer =

American business writer (1928–2019)

Martin Prager Mayer (January 14, 1928 – August 1, 2019) was the writer of 35 non-fiction books, including Madison Avenue, U.S.A. (1958), The Schools (1961), The Lawyers (1967), About Television (1972), The Bankers (1975), The Builders (1978), Risky Business: The Collapse of Lloyd's of London (1995), The Bankers: The Next Generation (1997), The Fed (2001), and The Judges (2005).

Mayer's books describe and criticize American industries or professional groups. His book on Madison Avenue was described by Cleveland Amory as "The first complete story on the ... advertising industry". Mayer wrote a music column for Esquire from 1952 to 1975. He was a guest scholar at the Brookings Institution. He was married to Revenue Watch Institute President Karin Lissakers. Mayer died at the age of 91 in Shelter Island, New York on August 1, 2019 from complications of Parkinson's disease.

He graduated from Harvard College after passing Italian.
