= Boğaziçi Hava Taşımacılığı =

IATA	ICAO	Call sign
PQ	BHT	Basfir
- Founded: 1987
- Ceased operations: 1989
- Hubs: Turkey

Boğaziçi Hava Taşımacılığı (BHT, Bosphorus Air Transport), named after Boğaziçi (Turkish for Bosphorus), was a Turkish charter cargo/passenger airline that operated for two years starting in 1987.

== History ==
BHT-Boğaziçi was 85% owned by Turkish Airlines and began services with a Douglas DC-10-10F and a Boeing 707-321C. Freight charters were flown to America, Europe, Asia and Africa. The aircraft were also used for passenger services serving Turkish migrant workers traveling home. BHT also had a leased Boeing 727-264 but by 1989 the airline was in severe financial problems and shut down.

== Fleet ==
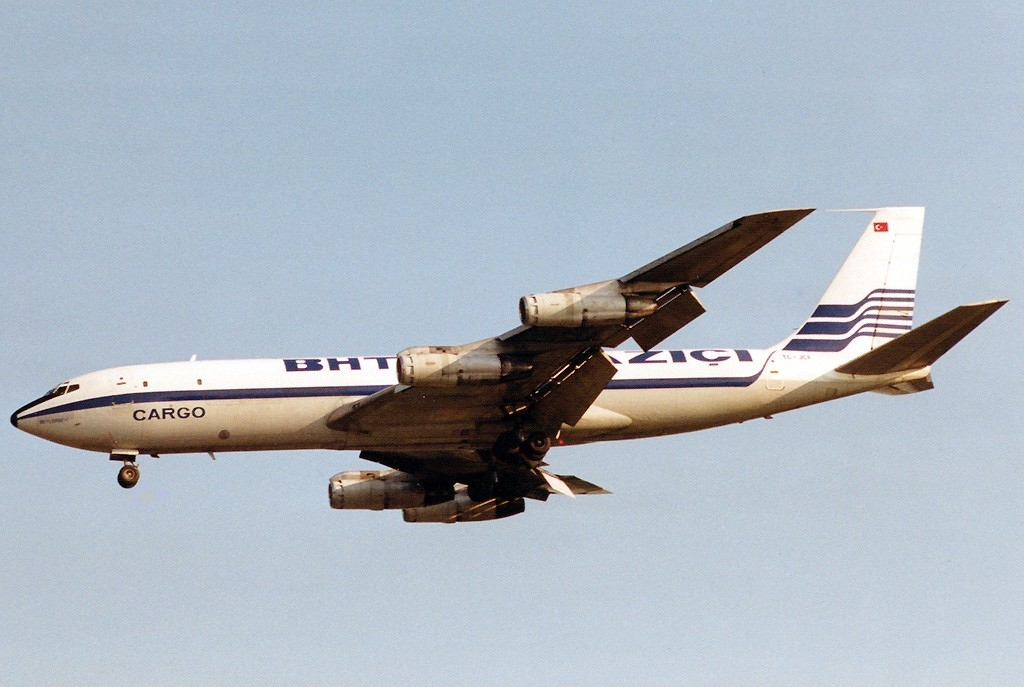
A Boğaziçi Hava Taşımacılığı Boeing 707-321C at Frankfurt in 1989

- 2 Douglas DC-10-10
- 2 Boeing 707-321C
- 2 Boeing 727-264
- Fokker F-28
