= Emily Rafferty =

Emily Kernan Rafferty was the first woman to serve as president of the Metropolitan Museum of Art, a position she held from 2005 to 2015 as part of a forty-year career at the museum. Currently the museum's president emerita, she also serves on the American Museum of Women's History Congressional Commission, and was a Board Chair of the New York Federal Reserve Bank from 2012 to 2016.

Rafferty was born and raised in New York City and earned a bachelor's degree from Boston University in 1971. Rafferty began working at the Met in 1976 in the development department and as she rose through the ranks, became the first woman to hold a vice president's role at the museum.
