= Lauren Kennedy =

American actress

- Kennedy at Broadway in Bryant Park on July 23, 2009
- Born: September 3, 1973 (age 52); Raleigh, North Carolina, U.S.
- Education: University of Cincinnati
- Occupations: Actress, singer
- Years active: 1980s–present

Lauren Kennedy (born September 3, 1973) is an American actress and singer who has performed numerous times on Broadway. She is now the producing artistic director of Theatre Raleigh in her home state of North Carolina.

== Education ==
Kennedy was born and raised in Raleigh, North Carolina and graduated from Needham Broughton High School in 1991. She started acting at the North Carolina Theatre while in high school. Kennedy attended the University of Cincinnati College-Conservatory of Music where she pursued a B.F.A. in Musical Theatre. She left school at the age of 19, when she was cast in the 1993 Los Angeles production of Andrew Lloyd Webber's Sunset Boulevard, After a nine-month run, she moved to New York for the musical's 1994 Broadway opening.

== Career ==
Kennedy frequently appeared in the original cast of the short-lived Side Show as the standby for Emily Skinner. She has also starred in Monty Python's Spamalot on Broadway as a replacement for the Lady of the Lake. She has been seen on Broadway in Les Misérables, Sunset Boulevard with Glenn Close, Side Show, and Cinderella with the New York City Opera. She originated the role of Cathy in Jason Robert Brown's The Last Five Years in its Chicago premiere, but opted to do South Pacific at the National Theatre in London instead of following the show Off-Broadway (she was replaced by Sherie Rene Scott). In 2004, she starred as Emma Carew in the concert-style version of Jekyll & Hyde – The Musical entitled Resurrection, opposite Kate Shindle and Rob Evan. However, she left the tour before it concluded, to be replaced by Brandi Burkhardt, who is heard on the recording of the tour.

In 2005, Kennedy starred in the world premiere of Frank Wildhorn & Jack Murphy's Waiting for the Moon, as Zelda Fitzgerald, which took place in Marlton, NJ. She was nominated for a Barrymore Award for Best Leading Actress in a Musical. In 2006, Kennedy played the role of Princess Nefertari in The Ten Commandments: The Musical opposite Val Kilmer. From 2007 through 2009, Lauren has worked actively with the new Wildhorn / Murphy musical Wonderland: Alice's New Musical Adventure.

She released two solo albums on PS Classics, an album of Jason Robert Brown material entitled Songs of Jason Robert Brown, and an album dedicated to new musical writers, titled Here and Now.

Kennedy starred in the musical Vanities at the Pasadena Playhouse, in California from August to September 2008. She then followed the musical to its Off-Broadway venue Second Stage Theatre.

Lauren is the artistic director of Theatre Raleigh, a theatre company in Raleigh, North Carolina.

She portrayed Diana Goodman, a mother struggling with bipolar disorder, in the North Carolina Theatre's 2015 production of Next to Normal.

== Theatre credits ==
=== Broadway ===
- Monty Python's Spamalot – The Lady of the Lake (First Replacement) (2006–2007)
- Les Misérables – Fantine (2002–2003)
- Side Show – Daisy Hilton (Standby for Emily Skinner) (1997)
- Sunset Boulevard – Mary/1st Masseuse, understudy for Betty Schaeffer (under Alice Ripley) (1994–1995)

=== Off-Broadway ===
- Good Ol' Girls – Several roles, leading actress (2010)
- Vanities, A New Musical – Mary (2009)

=== West End ===
- South Pacific – Ensign Nellie Forbush (2001–02), National Theatre

=== Regional stage ===
- 9 to 5 – Violet Newstead (2021), North Carolina Theatre
- Mamma Mia! – Donna Sheridan (2019), North Carolina Theatre
- Big Fish – Sandra Templeton Bloom (2018), Theatre Raleigh
- The Mystery of Edwin Drood – Miss Alice Nutting/Edwin Drood (2016), Theatre Raleigh
- Next to Normal – Diana Goodman (2015), North Carolina Theatre
- Parade – Lucille Frank (2014), Theatre Raleigh
- Les Misérables – Fantine (2014), North Carolina Theatre
- August: Osage County – Karen Weston (2012), Theatre Raleigh
- Zelda: An American Love Story – Zelda Fitzgerald (2012), The Flat Rock Playhouse, Flat Rock, North Carolina
- Into the Woods – The Witch (2012), Westport Country Playhouse, Westport, Connecticut
- Evita – Eva Perón (2011), North Carolina Theatre
- Violet – Violet Karl (2011), Theatre Raleigh
- Evita – Eva Perón (2011), Casa Mañana, Fort Worth, Texas
- 1776 – Martha Jefferson (2009), Paper Mill Playhouse, Millburn, New Jersey
- Annie Get Your Gun – Annie Oakley (2008), North Carolina Theatre
- Lone Star Love – Agnes Ford (2007), Seattle, Washington
- Frank Wildhorn's Waiting for the Moon – Zelda Fitzgerald (Marlton, NJ, Lenape Performing Arts Center) (2005) (World premiere)
- Beauty and the Beast – Belle (2005), North Carolina Theatre
- The Ten Commandments: The Musical – Nefertari (2004), Los Angeles, Kodak Theatre
- Jekyll & Hyde – Emma Carew (Marlton, NJ, Lenape Performing Arts Center, and Mohegan Sun, CT) (2004)
- Breakfast at Tiffany's – Holly Golightly (2004), St. Louis, MUNY)
- The Last Five Years – Cathy (2001), Chicago
- The Rhythm Club – Petra (2000), Washington, D.C.
- White Christmas – Judy Haines, (2000), St. Louis, MUNY
- Hot Shoe Shuffle – Maddy(Theatre Under the Stars, Houston)
- Sunset Boulevard – Mary/1st Masseuse, understudy for Betty Schaeffer (under Judy Kuhn) (1993–1994) (Los Angeles)
- Good News – Corda (1993), Wichita, Kansas

=== Tour ===
- Sunset Boulevard – Betty Schaeffer (1995–1997)

=== Film ===
- The Ten Commandments: The Musical

== Discography ==
- Good Ol' Girls: Original Off-Broadway Cast Recording
- Vanities, A New Musical: Original Off-Broadway Cast Recording
- Lauren Kennedy: Here and Now (solo album)
- Lauren Kennedy: Songs of Jason Robert Brown (first solo CD)
- The Ten Commandments: The Musical World Premiere at Kodak Theatre, DVD
- Dracula: The Musical: Concept Recording
- I Sing, the new musical: Original Cast Recording
- South Pacific: 2002 Royal National Theatre Recording
- Side Show: Original Broadway Cast Recording
- Sunset Boulevard: Original Cast Recording
- Good News!
- This Ordinary Thursday, The Music of Georgia Stitt
- Life Upon the Wicked S.T.A.G.E: A Tribute to Jerome Kern
- Paul Simon.
