= Cortes Wesley Randell =

American businessman (1935–2020)

- Born: September 28, 1935
- Died: December 29, 2020 (aged 85)
- Education: University of Virginia
- Occupation: Businessman

Cortes Wesley Randell (September 28, 1935 – December 29, 2020) was an American businessman. Randell worked on the Ballistic Missile Early Warning System. He also founded the National Student Marketing Corporation, and was president of Federal News Service.

== Life and career ==
Randell was born in Washington, D.C. on September 28, 1935. His parents were Cortes Gilbert Randell (1896-1996) and Carolina Edna (née Schmidt) Randell (1905-1946). Randell had one sibling, Marguerite.

Randell graduated from the University of Virginia with an engineering degree in 1959. He was a member of the Jefferson Society.

Randell worked for General Electric where he worked in the first nuclear submarine, the Sea Wolf. While at General Electric, he also worked on the Ballistic Missile Early Warning System which replaced the Dew Line radars in Canada. After leaving General Electric, Randell worked for the ITT Corporation in Chicago, the electronics company for the worldwide warning system at Offutt Air Force Base.

In 1966, Randell founded the National Student Marketing Corporation, which marketed to high school and college-aged students.

In 1968, the National Student Marketing Corporation went public as NSMC. NSMC worked with clients including Time, Ford, and American Airlines, through advertising agencies including J. Walter Thompson, Ted Bates and Co, Boyle Dane and Bernbach. He resigned his position as president in 1970. NMSC Insurance was sold to Fireman's Fund Insurance Company in 1981 for $54 million.

In 1975, Randell pleaded guilty to misrepresenting the company's earning and was sentenced to 18 months in prison for stock fraud. In 1979, a federal jury convicted Randell of mail and stock fraud for his involvement with the National Commercial Credit Corp, a new fraud he perpetrated (with deputy assistant secretary of labor, John B. Mumford) while Cortes was still serving time from his first conviction! He was sentenced to seven years in prison, and released in 1984.

In 1984, Randell became president of Federal News Service. He later became president and chairman of the board of directors of United Savings Club, a company featuring consumer discounts, which was reported to be investigated by Orlando Police Department's Economic Crime Unit.

Randell served as Chairman and Director of a company called eModel, a wholly owned subsidiary of Options Talent Group, which was under investigation for alleged unethical and illegal behavior. The senior assistant attorney general for the state of Florida found that no substantial violation of the law could be found and recommended the investigation be closed.

Randell married Joan Violet Wirz in 1968. He died in Texas on December 29, 2020, at the age of 85.
