= Beguiled Again =

Beguiled Again is a musical revue compiling the works of Richard Rodgers (music) and Lorenz Hart (lyrics), who are often referred to as Rodgers and Hart. The show was conceived by J. Barry Lewis, Lynnette Barkley and Craig D. Ames. It is almost entirely music, with minimal dialogue between some of the songs.

It was first performed at the Florida Stage in Manalapan, Florida and was the theater's most successful production to date. The show won the Carbonell Award in 1997 (an award for theater and the arts in South Florida).

== Song list ==
Some of the classic songs by Rodgers & Hart are showcased in this revue, including:

- "Blue Moon" (1934)
- "Johnny One Note", "My Funny Valentine" and "The Lady Is a Tramp" from Babes in Arms (1937)
- "Bewitched, Bothered and Bewildered"
- "With A Song In My Heart" from Spring is Here (1929)
- "Mountain Greenery" and "Manhattan" from The Garrick Gaieties (1925)
- "Why Can't I"
- "Ten Cents a Dance"
- "It Never Entered My Mind" from Higher and Higher (1940)
- "Unrequited Love"
