= Theatre Under the Stars (Houston) =

Non-profit musical theater company in Houston, Texas, USA

Coordinates: 29.7617°N 95.3696°W

- Formation: 1968
- Type: Theatre group
- Location: Houston, Texas
- Artistic director: Dan Knechtges
- Website: www.tuts.org

Theatre Under the Stars (TUTS) is a year-round, professional, non-profit musical theatre production company. It is located in Houston, Texas, performing mostly at the Hobby Center for the Performing Arts. Theatre Under The Stars’ season generally includes both self-produced shows as well as national touring productions. While best known for their main stage shows at the Hobby Center in Downtown Houston, and their annual free summer shows at the Miller Outdoor Theatre, it also offers educational programming through their training branch (The Humphreys School of Musical Theatre / HSMT), education programs for children with special needs through The River, and a wide array of community outreach projects. Founded by Frank M. Young in 1968, TUTS is currently under the management of Tony Award-nominated artistic director Dan Knechtges and executive director, Hilary J. Hart.

== History ==
TUTS has offered free public performances in the Miller Outdoor Theatre in Hermann Park each year since 1968 (deriving its name from these outdoor performances), giving 48 free large-scale musicals there through July 2010. To date, TUTS has produced more than 300 musicals including many local, national and world premieres such as Kopit and Yeston's Phantom, Disney’s Beauty and the Beast, and Irving Berlin’s White Christmas. TUTS has also produced international tours including Debbie Reynolds in The Unsinkable Molly Brown, Juliet Prowse in Mame, Robert Goulet in Man of La Mancha, as well as local re-inventions of classics Cabaret and Les Misérables.

== Humphreys School of Musical Theatre ==
The Humphreys School of Musical Theatre (HSMT) provides instruction and stage experience for more than 1,700 students annually, offering year-round programs through both open-enrollment and audition-based classes. In 2016, Dave Clemmons became the newly appointed Dean of School for HSMT. TUTS operates an apprentice conservatory training program for high school students who may not be exposed to musical theatre at their schools. Housed in the Hobby Center for the Performing Arts. Students of HSMT have appeared on Broadway, National Tours, and London's West End.

== Education and Community Engagement ==
In addition to on-site educational programming at the Hobby Center, TUTS also brings musical theatre education into the community through local hospitals, schools and community centers throughout the greater Houston area. Through a partnership with the YMCA of Greater Houston TUTS brings creative drama based residencies to after school programs throughout the city.

Theatre Under The Stars merged with The River Performing and Visual Arts Center in 2010, creating a barrier free arts education model for non-profit musical theatre performing arts organizations. With the merger, TUTS Education now provides extended on-site programming as well as off-site programming for children in schools, hospitals and other community-based sites.

== Tommy Tune Awards ==
Founded in 2002 and named in honor of native Houstonian and ten time Tony Award winner Tommy Tune, the awards honor the best and brightest in Houston's high school musical theatre programs. Annually, seventy-two high schools located within fifty miles of downtown Houston produce a full-length musical in order to compete in 18 categories: Leading Actor, Leading Actress, Supporting Actor, Supporting Actress, Featured Performer, Ensemble, Scenic Design, Lighting Design, Costume Design, Stage Crew & Technical Execution, Orchestra, Musical Direction, Choreography, Direction, and Overall Best Musical. The competition is a part of the National High School Theatre Awards.
