= Uwe Kröger =

German actor (born 1964)

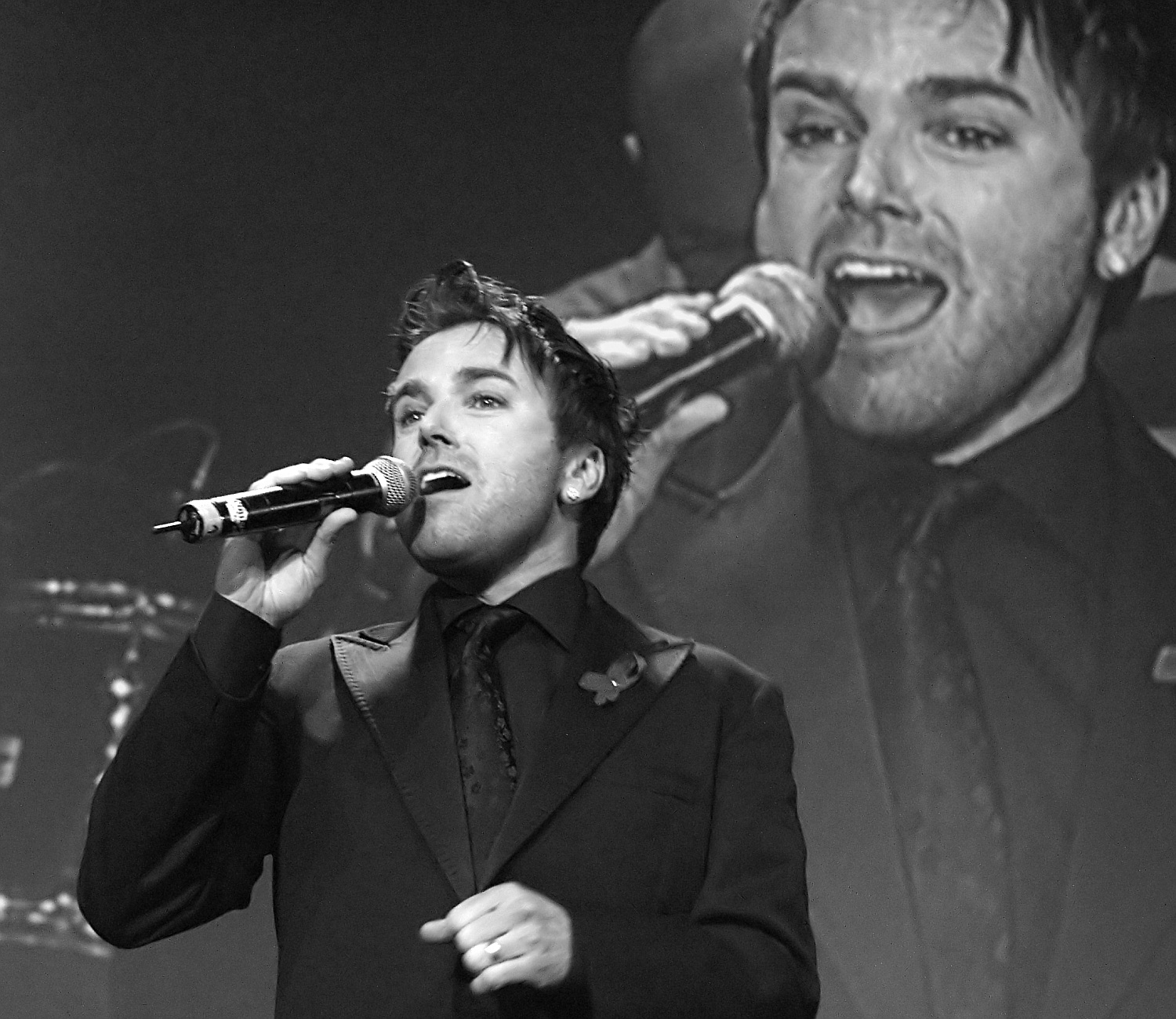
Uwe Kröger, 2006

Uwe Kröger (German pronunciation: [ˈuːvə ˈkʁøːɡɐ]; born 4 December 1964 in Hamm, West Germany) is a German actor, singer, and guitar player. He is a musical star in the German-speaking countries of the world. Besides starring on stage, Kröger has taken part in galas and concerts, as well as making television and film appearances. He has released cast recordings and solo CDs. He also played Captain Von Trapp singing in German and English in The Sound of Music.

== Career ==
Kröger studied song, dance, and acting at the Universität der Künste Berlin (then called Hochschule der Künste). Shortly after finishing his education, he starred in Starlight Express in Bochum where he became the first German performer to play Rusty the Steam Engine. Then, he starred in the Viennese and Amsterdam productions of Les Misérables, playing various roles, and he was also the Assistant Resident Director in Amsterdam. Leading roles followed in Jesus Christ Superstar, The Rocky Horror Show and Starmania.

Kröger's breakthrough performance was in the role of der Tod (English: Death) in the world premiere of Elisabeth, a musical by Michael Kunze and Sylvester Levay, in Vienna in 1992. Two years later, producer Cameron Mackintosh offered him the role of the American GI Chris in the German-language premiere of Miss Saigon in Stuttgart where he received phenomenal reviews.

In 1995, Kröger was cast by Sir Andrew Lloyd Webber to star as Joe Gillis in the German-language premiere of Sunset Boulevard in Niedernhausen. In 1997, he was offered the role of the Beast in the German premiere of the Disney musical Die Schöne und das Biest (Beauty and the Beast in English) in Stuttgart. He then went on to play the role of the Emcee in Cabaret in Vienna before he returned to Miss Saigon (again as Chris) in Stuttgart.

From October 1999 to May 2000, Kröger played the antagonistic Archbishop Colloredo in the world premiere of Kunze and Levay's new musical Mozart! in Vienna. In June 2000, he played the Pharaoh in Joseph and the Amazing Technicolor Dreamcoat at the Raimund Theater in Vienna.

In October 2000, Kröger had his West End debut with the title role of the European premiere of Napoleon at the Shaftesbury Theatre in London. In 2001, he returned to the part der Tod for the German premiere of Elisabeth at the Colosseum Theater in Essen. That year, he also starred in his first operetta; he played Felix in Ralph Benatzky's comedy Bezauberndes Fräulein (The Charming Young Lady in English) in Vienna.

In the summer of 2003, Kröger could be seen in Amstetten as Burrs in the German-language premiere of the off-Broadway musical The Wild Party.

He took on the part of Javert in Les Misérables in the Theater des Westens in Berlin. In January 2004, he went on tour with his colleagues Pia Douwes, Marika Lichter, Viktor Gernot and Anna Maria Kaufmann in the concert production of "Musical Moments". He also could be heard on the German version of Andrew Lloyd Webber's The Phantom of the Opera as the Phantom. In May 2004, he held two concerts, "Uwe Kröger in Concert" and "Uwe Kröger and Friends" in his hometown of Hamm.

In June 2004, he traveled to Japan to guest-perform in a concert tour "Diva 2004" with Japanese musical star Maki Ichiro. In November the year, he performed in the gala "Best of Musical" in Köln with other well-known German musical stars.

From 16 December 2004 to the end of February 2005, Kröger starred as Burrs again in The Wild Party, this time in Klagenfurt. In February 2005, he continued one of his famous concert series with the new tour "Musical Moments 2."

Kröger then took on the role of Cardinal Richelieu in the German-language premiere of die Drei Musketiere [The Three Musketeers in English; Drie Musketiers in Dutch (original language)] in Berlin until January 2006. Between February and April 2006, he toured Germany with the gala "Best of Musical 2006". From May to July, Kröger was able to reprise his role as the Phantom, this time on stage in Essen.

From September 2006 until the end of 2007, Kröger performed in the Kunze and Levay production Rebecca in Vienna as male lead, Maxim de Winter. In August 2007, he took on the role of Abraham Van Helsing in a production of Dracula, the Musical as part of the Musical Festival Graz.

In 2008, he returned to Berlin to perform the role of Death again in the tour production of Elisabeth.

His first solo CD was Boulevard der Sehnsucht ("Boulevard of Longing" in English). His next CD, Favourites, included a duet with Belgian star Helmut Lotti. Kröger also appeared with Pia Douwes, Marika Lichter and Viktor Gernot in the concert series "In Love with Musical" and "Still in Love with Musical", which continued with a new production and recording, "In Love with Musical Again".

Kröger's single CD You Saved My Life (2002) was dedicated to "Licht ins Dunkel" and the flood victims in Austria. In 2003, his CD From Broadway to Hollywood was released. 2004 saw another release in his single "All I Want", and in 2005, Wild Party appeared. His newest album, Uwe! Das Beste aus 20 Jahren, was released on 7 November 2006.

One of his honors include an IMAGE Award for his work in Sunset Boulevard. He was voted "Best Male Actor" and "Best Male Musical Voice" three times by readers of Da Capo magazine. He was ranked "Musical Star Number 1" for the tenth time in 2005 by readers of the magazine Musicals.

== Personal life ==
Kröger is openly gay and was in a relationship with Dr. Christopher Wolf, a cardiologist, for over twenty years. They split amicably in November 2015, and he has now been in a relationship with Kiko Marin Tomas, a model and fitness trainer, for over a year. They live together in Barcelona. They got married on 8-10-2022.

== Musical engagements ==
- September 1988 – June 1989, Starlight Express, Rusty and Flat Top, Bochum
- July 1989 – April 1990, Les Misérables, Marius, Enjolras, and Swing, Vienna
- May–August 1990, Jesus Christ Superstar, Jesus and Annas, Schwäbisch Hall
- February–October 1991, Les Misérables, Enjolras, Feuilly, assistant resident director, Amsterdam
- December 1991 – June 1992, Starmania, Ziggy, Essen
- September–December 1992, Jesus Christ Superstar, Jesus, Regensburg
- September 1992 – October 1994, Elisabeth, der Tod, Vienna
- September–October 1993, The Rocky Horror Show, Frank'n Furter, Vienna
- December 1994 – November 1995, Miss Saigon, Chris, Stuttgart
- December 1995 – August 1997, Sunset Boulevard, Joe Gillis, Niedernhausen
- December 1996 – January 1997, Elisabeth, der Tod, Vienna
- December 1997 – February 1999, Die Schöne und das Biest, Beast, Stuttgart
- December 1998 – January 1999, Cabaret, Emcee, Vienna
- April–July 1999, Miss Saigon, Chris, Stuttgart
- October 1999 – May 2000, Mozart!, Archbishop Colloredo, Vienna
- June–July 2000, Joseph and the Amazing Technicolor Dreamcoat, Pharaoh, Vienna
- October 2000 – February 2001, Napoleon, Napoléon, London
- March 2001 – June 2003, Elisabeth, der Tod, Essen
- August 2001, July–August 2002, Bezauberndes Fräulein, Felix, Vienna
- July–August 2003, The Wild Party, Burrs, Amstetten
- September 2003 – December 2004, Les Misérables, Javert, Berlin
- December 2004 – February 2005, The Wild Party, Burrs, Klagenfurt
- April 2005 – January 2006, 3 Musketiere, Cardinal Richelieu, Berlin
- May–July 2006, Das Phantom der Oper, Phantom, Essen
- September 2006 – December 2007, Rebecca, Maxim de Winter, Vienna
- August 2007, Dracula, the Musical, Abraham Van Helsing, Graz
- April–August 2008, Elisabeth, der Tod, Berlin
- September 2008 – December 2008, Rebecca, Maxim de Winter, Vienna
- February 2009–Present, Rudolf: Affaire Mayerling, Count Taaffe, Vienna
- October 2010, Kim Junsu's Musical Concert, South Korea
- October 2011, The Sound of Music, Baron von Trapp, Salzburg, Salzburger Landestheater

== Discography ==
- 1991, Les Misérables original Amsterdam cast recording
- 1992, Elisabeth original Vienna cast recording
- 1992, Die Schatten werden länger, Maxi-CD
- 1993, Musical? Oh My God, original Vienna cast recording
- 1993, Highlights – Die faszinierende Welt..., sampler
- 1993, Treffpunkt Geisterbahn, original Vienna cast recording
- 1993, Music from the Heart of Europe – The Wind Beneath My Wings, Sampler
- 1994, Boulevard der Sehnsucht, solo album
- 1994, Siebzehn Stufen, Maxi-CD
- 1994, Böse Jungs, Maxi-CD
- 1994, Peter Weck präsentiert..., sampler
- 1995, Miss Saigon, original Stuttgart cast recording
- 1995, Musical Christmas in Vienna, sampler
- 1995, Living Water, sampler
- 1996, Sunset Boulevard, original Niedernhausen cast recording
- 1996, In Love with Musical, sampler
- 1996, Favourites, solo album
- 1997, Still in Love with Musical, sampler
- 1997, Musical Musical, sampler
- 1997, Die Schöne und das Biest (pop version), sampler
- 1998, Die Schöne und das Biest, original Stuttgart cast recording
- 1998, Elisabeth – Musik einer Epoche, sampler
- 1998, Kaiserin Elisabeth Melodien, sampler
- 1998, Highlights of Cabaret and More Vienna cast recording
- 1999, Mozart!, original Vienna cast recording
- 1999, Alles Musical, sampler
- 1999, Music of the Night sampler
- 2000, Only the Best, solo album
- 2000, Die fantastische Welt der Musicals – Die Highlights der deutschen Originalaufnahmen, sampler
- 2000, Viktor Gernot presents: Alles Musical – Vol. 2, sampler
- 2001, Elisabeth, Maxi-CD
- 2001, Elisabeth, original Essen cast recording
- 2001, In Love with Musical Again, sampler
- 2002, Musical Moments, solo album
- 2002, Arena der Stars, sampler
- 2002, Bezauberndes Fräulein, Vienna cast recording
- 2002, You Saved My Life, solo album
- 2002, Elisabeth – 10th Anniversary Concert, live recording
- 2002, Musical Moments Vol. 2, sampler
- 2003, ORF Willkommen Österreich, sampler
- 2003, From Broadway to Hollywood, solo album
- 2004, Musicalstars singen ABBA-Hits!, sampler
- 2004, Von Augenblick zu Augenblick, identical to From Broadway to Hollywood
- 2004, All I Want, single album
- 2004, Best of Musical!, sampler
- 2004, Das Phantom der Oper, German film soundtrack
- 2005, 3 Musketiere, original Berlin cast recording
- 2005, The Wild Party, Maxi-CD
- 2005, Die größten Musical-Hits, sampler
- 2005, MUSICAL STARS, sampler
- 2005, Stärker, by Marciel
- 2006, Nur das Beste – die schönsten Musicalhits, sampler
- 2006, MUSICAL STARS Vol. 2, sampler
- 2006, HANDS of LOVE, benefit single CD
- 2006, Zeitlos, by Marika Lichter
- 2006, Best of Musical Vol. 2, sampler
- 2006, Uwe! – Das Beste aus 20 Jahren, solo album
- 2006, Rebecca, original Vienna cast recording
- 2007, Rebecca: Gesamtaufnahme, two-disc Vienna cast recording
- 2008, Dracula original Graz cast recording
- 2009, Rudolf – Affaire Mayerling original Vienna cast recording

== Awards ==
- Best Young Actor 1996, awarded by the Austrian stage magazine Bühne
- IMAG. Award 1997, Best Male Actor, for Joe Gillis in Sunset Boulevard
- Number 1 Austrian Musical Performer 2000, elected by the readers of Bühne magazine
- Number 1 Musical Performer 2001, elected by the readers of the German magazine Musicals
- Best Actor 2003, 2004, 2005, elected by the readers of the German musical magazine Da Capo
- Number 1 German-speaking Musical Performer 2006, elected for the tenth time by readers of the German magazine Musicals
