= Ock Joo-hyun =

South Korean singer and actress (born 1980)

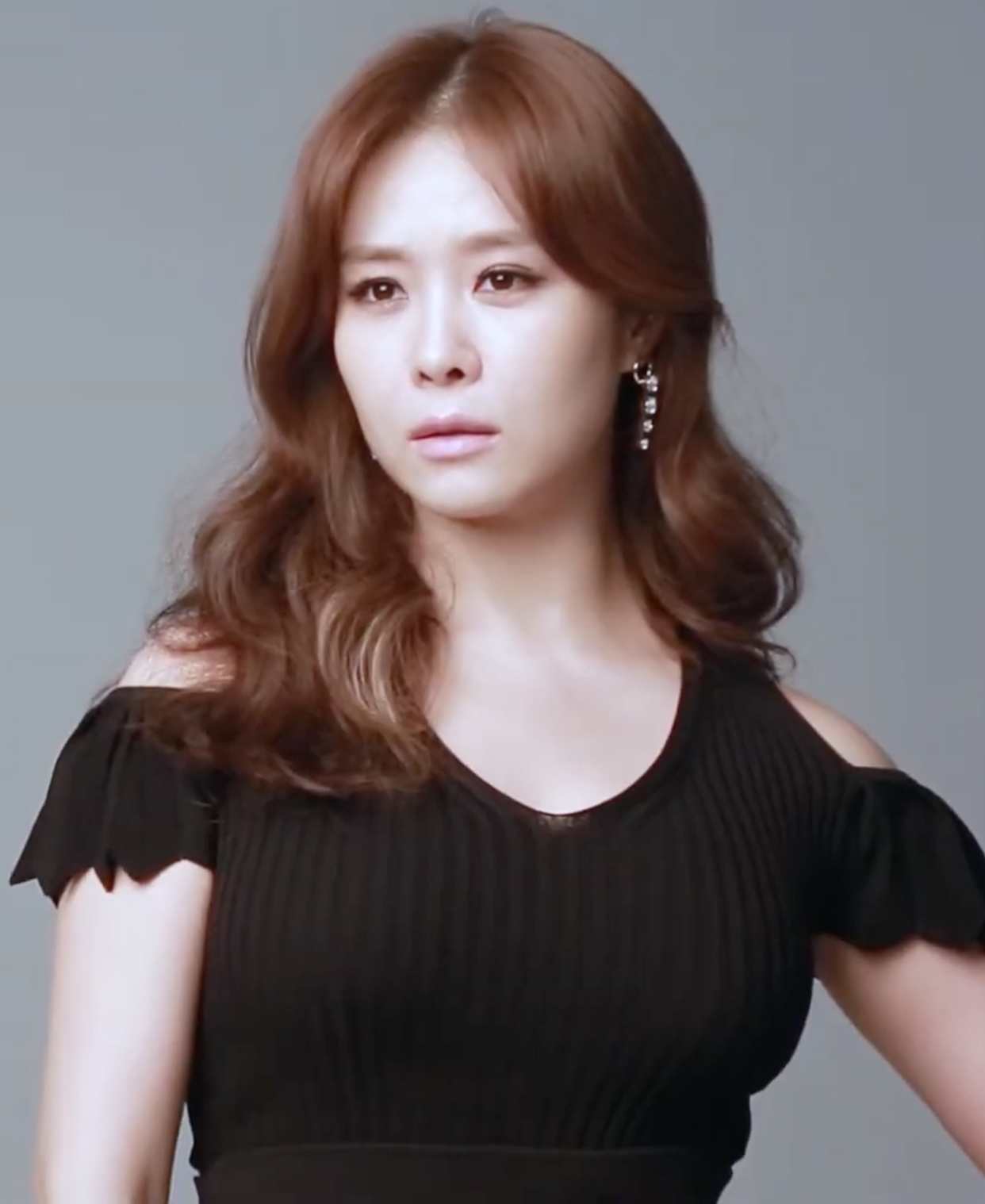
- Ock in March 2017

Background information
- Also known as: Ock Ju-hyun, Oak Joo Hyun, Ok Joo Hyun
- Born: Ock Joo-hyun; March 20, 1980 (age 46); Seoul, South Korea
- Genres: Pop; dance-pop
- Occupations: Singer; actress; model; TV presenter; radio DJ
- Years active: 1998–present
- Labels: Asia Bridge Contents; Mnet Media; DSP Media
- Member of: Fin.K.L

Korean name
- Hangul: 옥주현
- Hanja: 玉珠鉉
- RR: Ok Juhyeon
- MR: Ok Chuhyŏn

Ock Joo-hyun (Korean: 옥주현; sometimes spelled Ock Ju-hyun; born March 20, 1980) is a South Korean singer and musical theatre actress, known mostly for her role as the lead singer of the South Korean girl group Fin.K.L. After their unofficial breakup in 2002, Ock released three solo albums and has participated in several musicals, namely Wicked, Aida, Chicago, Cats, 42nd Street, and The Count of Monte Cristo.

== Career ==
=== As a member of Fin.K.L ===
Fin.K.L debuted in 1998 with DSP Entertainment and quickly became popular, catapulting all its members into stardom. Ock served as the main vocalist for Fin.K.L until it became inactive as a group in 2002; she has since taken part in Fin.K.L's digital single "Fine Killing Liberty" in fall of 2005, including filming the music video.

=== Solo music ===
Starting her solo career summer in 2003, Ock came out with a ballad called "난..." ("Nan...", meaning "I..."), which entered the top 10 of Korean music charts. By her second album, which came out late fall in 2004, the public was startled by the sudden change in appearance, as she had experienced a significant weight loss; Ock attributed to her intense yoga training. She was able to perform on various music shows for a lengthy period with her singles "Catch" and "Sweet Rainyday".

Her third album, titled Remind, was released on June 12, 2008 The first single off the album is "Honey".

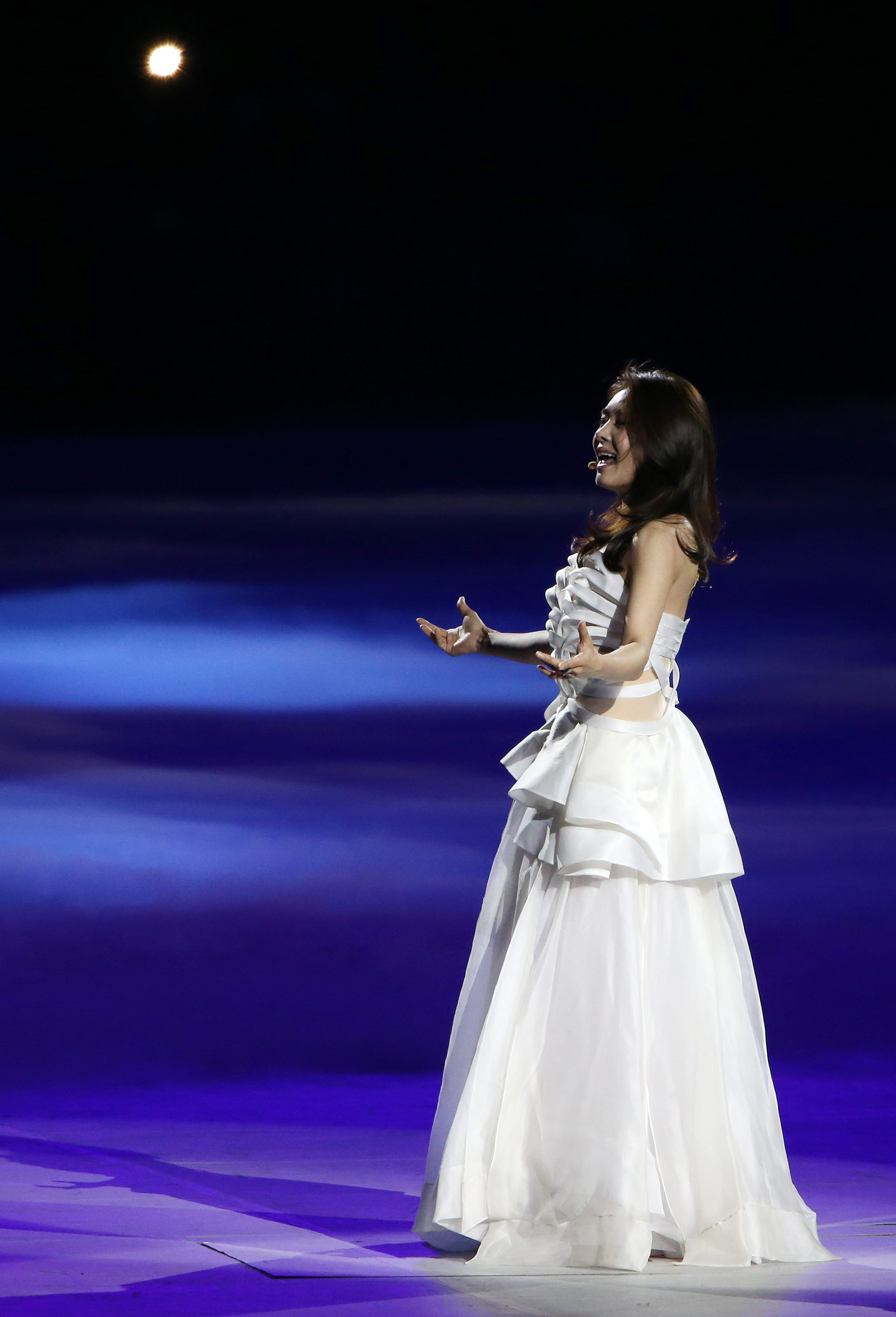
Ock performing at the 2014 Asian Games opening ceremony

Her next album, "Reflection" was released in 2013. In 2014, Ock partnered with musical composer and director Frank Wildhorn, with whom she worked together in the musical "Monte Cristo", to release an English language album titled "Gold" with popular musical numbers.

=== Other works ===
In addition to launching three albums, Ock has worked as a radiostation DJ for MBC, and as an MC for Korean networks SBS, MBC, and KBS. She has also received an award for "Best Radio DJ" during the MBC awards of 2005. She obtained the main role in the Korean version of Tim Rice's musical Aida, starting on August 27, 2005.

Ock has also done television work as a permanent member on various variety shows. In addition to being one of the main girls on Heroine 5, she was a part of Goldfish, an MBC TV show, in 2006. She was featured in the first season of MBC's reality program, "I am a Singer" with other veteran stars of Korean music. She was voted first place for her rendition of "1000 days", and also sang Korean ballad "Love is Gone", "Man is Ship, Woman is Harbor" and a re-make of fellow Fin.K.L member Lee Hyori's "U-Go Girl".

Ock has continued to further her "yoga celebrity" career, even helping to open up a yoga studio. She also released her own yoga VHS, DVD. More recently she published a new book about maintaining fitness of mind and body.

In March 2009, it was revealed that Ock would be teaching classes in music at Dong Seoul College. She also appeared in Tony Hawk's pro skater 2 as a playable character.

=== Musical actor ===
Ock debuted in the role of Aida as the lead role in 2005. Many praised her vocals but were intensely critical of acting as well as her status as a former k-pop idol. When she returned to the role again in 2010 she fell ill and was unable to make one of the shows. The production only featured a single cast and no understudies or standbys were used during the run. Due to this, the show was cancelled and many people complained at the oversight of the situation. The following year she starred in Chicago and was met with better reviews saying that her acting had improved.

In 2010, she appeared in the Count of Monte Cristo in the main role of Mercedes. She appeared as the leading female role in the Korean adaptation of Das Musical: Elisabeth, opposite JYJ's Junsu in 2012. She received a Best Actress Golden Ticket Award and Korean Musical Award for this role. She followed these acclaimed adaptations of European musical theater into a new role as "Mrs. Danvers" in the musical "Rebecca," inspired by Hitchcock's movie of the same name. Playing a slightly unhinged and dark character, Ock showed a new side of herself and received the 2013 Korean Musical Award for Best Actress in a supporting role.

In 2014, Ock starred as Elphaba in the first Korean production of "Wicked the Musical" and also reprises the role of Danvers in "Rebecca" due to its popularity in South Korea. Starting in November 2014 Ock began her role as Marie Antoinette, in the musical Marie Antoinette at Charlotte Theater in Seoul, South Korea.

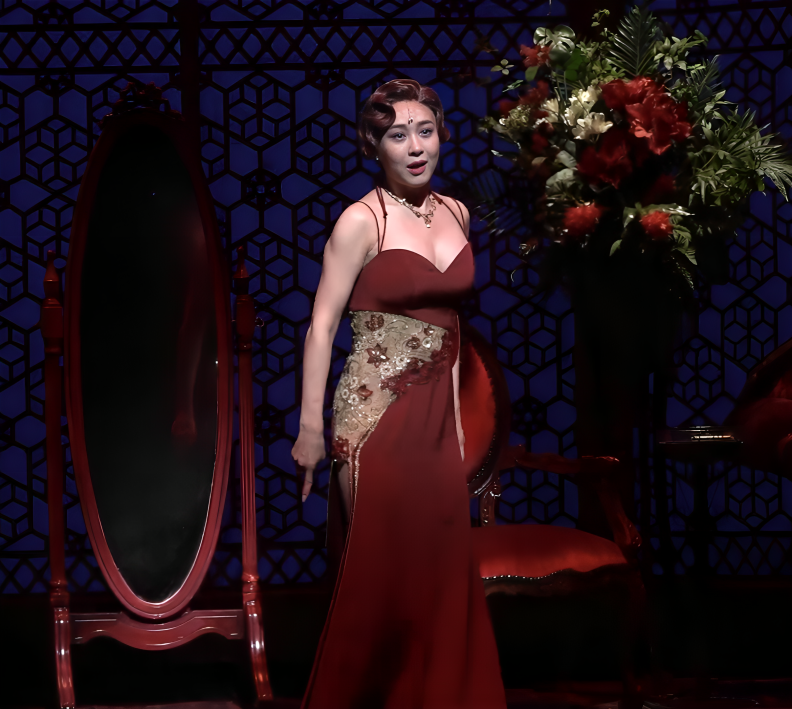
Ock as Mata Hari in 2022

In 2016, Ock starred in her first original role with Mata Hari. It was also the first original musical from EMK Musical Company which was created in collaboration with Frank Wildhorn. He had stated that she had been one of the main inspirations for the character and songs of Mata Hari, and had sung high praises of her performances in his other musicals such as The Count of Monte Cristo. She later reprised her role in the 2017 and 2022 production which had since been revised.

In 2018, Ock was cast as Anna Karenina (along with Jeong Sun Ah) for the Korean premiere. Prior to that, she travelled to Russia to meet the cast and crew of the Russian production that was opening before her own run. She appeared at the curtain call for opening night, and sang a trio with Valeria Lanskaya (Anna Karenina) and Sergey Lee (Alexey Vronsky).

In February 2022, OCK has decided not to renew the contract with Potluck Co., Ltd.

== Theatre ==
Theatre Credits
Year	Production	Role	Venue	Notes/Ref.
2005	Aida	Aida	LG Arts Center	First Korean-language production
2007	Chicago	Roxie Hart	Sejong Center	First Korean-language production
2008	Chicago	Roxie Hart	National Theater of Korea	
2008	Cats	Grizabella	Charlotte Theater	
2009	42nd Street	Peggy Sawyer	LG Arts Center	
2009	Chicago	Roxie Hart	Seongnam Arts Center	
2010	Chicago	Roxie Hart	Seongnam Arts Center	
2010	The Count of Monte Cristo	Mercedes	Universal Arts Center	Korean Premiere Production
2010–2011	Aida	Aida	Seongnam Arts Center	Single casting only*
2011	The Count of Monte Cristo	Mercedes	Chungmu Arts Center	
2011	Guys and Dolls	Adelaide	LG Arts Center	
2012	Elisabeth das Musical	Elisabeth	Blue Square Interpark Hall	Korean Premiere Production
2012–2013	Rudolf das Musical; The Last Kiss	Mary Vertesera	Chungmu Arts Center	Korean Premiere Production
2013	Rebecca das Musical	Mrs. Danvers	LG Arts Center	Korean Premiere Production
2013	Elisabeth das Musical	Elisabeth	Seoul Arts Center Opera Center	
2013	Wicked	Elphaba	Charlotte Theater	First Korean-language Production
2014	Rebecca das Musical	Mrs. Danvers	Blue Square Interpark Hall	
2014	Marie Antoinette das Musical	Marie Antoinette	Charlotte Theater	Korean Premiere Production and premiere of a new version of Marie Antoinette
2015	Elisabeth das Musical	Elisabeth	Blue Square Interpark Hall	
2016	Mata Hari	Mata Hari	Blue Square Interpark Hall	World Premiere Production
2016	Sweeney Todd	Mrs. Lovett	Charlotte Theater	
2017	The Bridges of Madison County	Francesca Johnson	Chungmu Arts Center	Korean Premiere Production, Single casting only*
2017	Mata Hari	Mata Hari	Sejong Center	
2017	Rebecca das Musical	Mrs. Danvers	Blue Square Interpark Hall	
2018	Anna Karenina	Anna Karenina	Seoul Arts Center Opera House	Korean Premiere Production
2018	Elisabeth das Musical	Elisabeth	Blue Square Interpark Hall	
2019	Sweeney Todd	Mrs. Lovett	Charlotte Theater	
2019	Rebecca	Mrs. Danvers	Chungmu Arts Center	
2020	Marie Curie	Marie Curie	Hongik Daehangro Artcenter	
2020	The Count of Monte Cristo	Mercedes	LG Arts Center	
2021	Wicked	Elphaba	Blue Square Interpark Hall	
2021	Wicked	Elphaba	Dream Theatre	
2021–2022	Rebecca	Mrs. Danvers	Chungmu Arts Center	
2022	Mata Hari	Mata Hari	Charlotte Theater	
2022	Elisabeth das Musical	Elisabeth	Blue Square Interpark Hall	
2023	Beethoven	Antony (Tony) Brentano	Seoul Arts Center Opera House	
2023	Red Book	Anna	Hongik University Daehangno Art Center Grand Theater	
2023	Beethoven season 2	Antony (Tony) Brentano	Sejong Center	
2023	Rebecca das Musical	Mrs. Danvers	Blue Square Shinhancard Hall	
2023–2024	Rebecca das Musical	Mrs. Danvers	LG Arts Center LG SIGNATURE Hall	
2024	Marie Antoinette das Musical	Margrid Arnaud	D-CUBE Link Arts Center	
2024	La Rose de Versailles	Oscar François de Jarjayes	Chungmu Arts Center	
2024–2025	Mata Hari	Mata Hari	LG Arts Center LG SIGNATURE Hall	
2025	The Voice of the Hamlet - The concert	Hamlet	National Theater of Korea Haneul Round Theater	
2025	Marie Curie	Marie Curie	Kwanglim Art Center BBCH Hall	
2025	Red Book	Anna	Universal Arts Center	
2025-2026	Bonnie & Clyde	Bonnie Parker	Hongik Daehangro Artcenter	
2026	Anna Karenina	Anna Karenina	Sejong Center	

* Note: Most, if not all, large scale South Korean Musicals are generally double or triple cast for a role. The actors share the role equally and alternate throughout the eight show week.

== Concerts ==
Year	Title	Dates	Venue	Notes
2011	Ock Joo Hyun 1st Concert	2011.12.11	Blue Square Interpark Hall	
2013	K-Musical Stars Concert	2013.09.20	LG Arts Center	With Im Tae Kyung, Kim Seung Dae, and Kai/Jeong Ki Yeol
2015	Promise 2015	2014.12.31	Sejong Center	With Im Tae Kyung, Im So Ha, Min Young Ki, Shin Young Sook, Jeon Dong Seok
2016	vOKal; 10th Anniversary Concert	2016.01.22–01.23	Blue Square Interpark Hall	Celebrating her 10th anniversary from her debut as a musical actress. The title is purposefully misspelt and capitalised to highlight "OK" which refers to her romanised last name.
2016	Memories The Musical Concert	2016.10.28 2016.11.11		With Lee Ji Hoon
2017	The Musical Festival in Galaxy	2017.09.10	Nanji Hangang Park	
2018	vOKal Concert	2018.03.17–03.18	LG Arts Center	
2018	Bigroof Musical Concert	2018.06.02	Busan Cinema Center	With Park Eun Tae, Lee Gun Myung, and Lee Ji Hye
2018	To Fly Higher	2018.07.14–07.15	LOTTE Concert Hall	Celebrating her 20th anniversary from her debut in the entertainment industry, which started with her debut in the Kpop group Fin.K.L. The title of the show is a play on words with "her" being highlighted in the word higher.
2018	Music of the Night	2018.11.09	Anseong Art Hall	With Lee Gun Myung, Lee Ji Hoon, and Lee Ji Hye
2018	TOYOTA CLASSICS Hybrid for Music	2018.11.14	Seoul Arts Center	
2018	HAF Festival	2018.11.30–2018.12.01		
2019	Best of the Best	2019.01.19	Incheon Culture & Arts Center	With Michael Lee
2019	Musical and the Number	2019.03.08	Gwang Ju Cultural Sports Center	With Lee Gun Myung, Michael lee, Yoon So Ho, and Lee Ji Hye
2019	Best of the Best	2019.03.16	Iksan Arts Center	With Michael Lee
2019	Musical and the Number	2019.04.16	Kimpo Art Hall	With Lee Gun Myung, Lee Ji Hye, and Yoon So Ho
2019	Coverstory No. 1	2019.05.19	LOTTE Concert Hall	With Im Tae Kyung
2019	ONLY; Kim Moon Jeong Concert	2019.06.07	LG Arts Center	Celebrating the anniversary and work of Kim Moon Jeong, a renowned Korean music director and conductor, and performing as a featured artist.
2019	Best of the Best; My Only Moment	2019.06.28	Uijeongbu Arts Center	With Michael Lee

== Video game appearances ==
Ock Joo-hyun is a playable character in the video game Tony Hawk's Pro Skater 2 (only in the South Korean PC version).

Year	Title	Role	Notes
2000	Tony Hawk's Pro Skater 2	Herself	South Korean PC version

== Filmography ==
=== Television shows ===
Year	Title	Role	Notes	Ref.
2021	Saturday Night Live Korea	Host	Episode 7	
2021	My Teenage Girl	Homeroom teacher		

=== Radio shows ===
Year	Title	Network	Role	Note	Ref.
2021	Kim Young-chul's Power FM	SBS Power FM	Special DJ	July 12 – July 13	

== Personal life ==
Ock graduated from Kyung Hee University with Sung Yu-ri and Gong Yoo in February 2005.

Allegedly Ock had revealed herself to be in a long-term relationship with Jeff Chang, son of Korean media mogul. The relationship was said to have started in 2006, however when she mentions him at the awards show where she thanked him, she refers to him as "a friend of mine". It's inferred that they have since broken up and she is not in a relationship with anyone currently. In the director's cut of the Fin.K.L. Camping Club variety show she stated that she didn't want to get married when her fellow members asked about her thoughts.

Ock's agencies TOI Entertainment and the earlier one-person firm Title Role (타이틀롤) were reported in September 2025 to have no popular-culture planning-business registration. Coverage framed that as a suspected illegal operation under the Popular Culture and Arts Industry Development Act (up to two years' imprisonment or a ₩20 million fine). TOI called the missed deadline a clear fault, denied any intent to dodge the law, and said online training had been completed about three years earlier but a later administrative step had been dropped. Ock later apologised in her own name, said registration was filed on 10 September 2025, and in December said an employee's error had skipped a follow-up step after 2022 training and that registration was finished on 23 September 2025. Namyangju Northern Police sent her to prosecutors without detention on 1 December 2025, saying the prior unregistered period still supported the allegation even after she registered.

== Awards and nominations ==
Year	Award-Giving Body	Category	Work	Result
2003	Mnet Asian Music Awards	Best Ballad Performance	"I"	Nominated
2005	MBC Drama Awards	Radio Sector	"Radio DJ"	Won
2008	2nd The Musical Awards	Performance	"Aida" in AIDA	Won
2009	3rd The Musical Award	Performance	"Roxy" in Chicago	Won
2010	6th Golden Ticket Award	Performance	"Mercedes" in Monte Cristo	Won
2012	6th The Musical Award	Performance	"Elisabeth" in Das Musical: Elisabeth	Won
2013	7th The Musical Award	Performance	"Mrs. Danvers" in Rebecca	Won
2013	9th Golden Ticket Award	Performance	"Mrs. Danvers" in Rebecca	Won
2014	8th The Musical Award	Performance	"Elphaba" in Wicked	Nominated
2021	2021 MBC Entertainment Awards	Special Award (Note: with Kwon Yu-ri, Ock Joo-hyun, Aiki and Jeon So-yeon)	My Teenage Girl	Won
