= Marie Antoinette (musical) =

- Music: Sylvester Levay
- Lyrics: Michael Kunze
- Book: Michael Kunze
- Basis: The life of Marie Antoinette; Queen Marie Antoinette by Endō Shūsaku
- Productions: 2006 Tokyo; 2006 Fukuoka; 2006 Osaka; 2007 Tokyo; 2009 Bremen; 2012 Tecklenburg; 2014 Seoul, Korea; 2016 Budapest, Hungary; 2018 Japan Tour

Marie Antoinette is a stage musical with music by Sylvester Levay and book and lyrics by Michael Kunze, the authors of Elisabeth, Mozart! and Rebecca. The Libretto was written in English and then translated into Japanese. The premiere took place on November 1, 2006 in Tokyo, Japan at the Imperial Garden Theater. Tamiya Kuriyama directed the original production. After running in Tokyo, the show was performed in Fukuoka, Osaka before moving back to Tokyo from April 2007 through May 2007.

The German premiere took place on January 30, 2009 at the Musical Theater Bremen with Kuriyama directing once again.

== Plot synopsis ==
Marie Antoinette tells the story of two parallel lives; that of the infamous Queen of France and that of Margrid Arnaud, a poor woman. Both are the same age, and both are pretty, but that's where the similarities end. While Margrid is roaming the streets of Paris in rags, Marie Antoinette dances and flirts at the Palais-Royal. The French Revolution changes all that. Margrid Arnaud rises and Marie Antoinette falls, and when the two women eventually meet two worlds collide and the drama unfolds. The musical uses the events of the French Revolution as a spectacular backdrop to the fate of the unhappy Queen. Margrid Arnaud personifies the nemesis of the monarchy, eventually leading to the extinction of Marie Antoinette and her world.

== Background ==
In an interview on his website, Kunze said that producers had offered to stage the show in German and English-speaking countries, but said that he wanted to have the Kuriyama production all over the world. His previous musicals were adapted for the country they were played in. Kunze believes that the production MA is the best interpretation of one of his Libretti so far. He praised the director and the cast.

After the Japanese and German productions, the show was heavily revised. The revised version premiered in Seoul, South Korea in 2014. The revised version has since been performed three more times in Korea (2019, 2021, and 2024), as a revival in Japan in 2018, and in Hungary in 2016.

== Songs ==
=== Original Production (Japan, Germany) ===
These songs are included in the production and are on the cast recording, which was released in March 2006.

Act I

- Prologue (The Great Cagliostro)
- All we feel is Hunger
- Why she, why not I?
- Look at her
- Why don't they eat the Cake?
- Blinded by a thousand Candles
- Turn, Turn
- A perfect Queen
- I'm sorry
- Gold out of Nothing at all
- The Voice in my Heart
- You've got to give them what they want
- If
- Doctor Guillotin's Machine
- Parce Qu'elle est Autrichinne
- The Voice in my Heart (Reprise)
- God cares for All
- All I do
- Lovers´ bickering
- I am the Best
- Seven weird Ingredients
- Some Day to remember

Act II

- The Bells of Justice
- France on Parade
- Turn, turn (Reprise)
- Woman of Paris!
- Money's talking
- The only thing I ever did right
- Something's wrong
- The Paris cut
- Reign of Terror
- The Flight to Varennes
- Why can't I just be a Smith
- Turn, turn (Reprise III)
- Onward, Brothers!
- Thank God, we're all mad
- All I do (Reprise)
- Taking the Boy
- Off with her Head!
- Her Time is up
- Blood must flow for Liberty!
- Freedom!

The cast recording also features three additional tracks:

- Blinded By A Thousand Candles
- The Voice in My Heart
- Money's Talking

=== Revised Production (Korea, Hungary, Japan revival) ===
Act I

- "Prologue (Intro)" – Ensemble (Revolutionaries)
- "Prologue (Marie Antoinette)" – Fersen
- "Look At Her" – Marie, Ensemble (Party Guests)
- "All I Do" – Marie, Fersen
- "Look at Her (Reprise)" – Ensemble (Party Guests)
- "Blinded By A Thousand Candles" – Margrid
- "Le Dernier Cri" – Rose, Leonard
- "Dazzling" – Marie, Rose, Leonard, Ensemble (Boutique Workers)
- "Why Can't Be A Smith" – Louis
- "This Night" – Margrid, Ensemble (The Poor)
- "Parce Qu'elle Ext Autrichienne" – Margrid
- "Why Does She Have More Than I??" – Margrid
- "A Smart Invention" – Louis, Guillotin
- "Turn, Turn" – Marie, Louis, Louis-Charles, Marie-Therese
- "Parce Qu'elle Ext Autrichienne" – Margrid, Ensemble (The Poor)
- "I'm The Best" – Duke of Orleans
- "Distant Thunder" – Fersen
- "All A Woman Can Be" – Marie
- "Looks" – Margrid, Orleans, Rose, Leonard
- "If" – Marie, Margrid, Fersen, Orleans, Ensemble (Party Guests)
- "Diamond Theme" – Rohan, Margrid
- "Assumption Day" – Ensemble (Citizens)
- "Snake Pit" – Marie, Louis
- "The Necklace Thing" – Marie, Louis, Rohan
- "It's Time To Speak Up" – Ensemble (Citizens)
- "Enough Is Enough" – Margrid, Ensemble (Citizens)
- "And When We Cry" – Fersen, Marie
- "The Wheel Of Fortune" – Company

Act II

- "He is King Who Controls The News" – Duke of Orleans
- "The Only Thing I Ever Did Right" – Marie, Fersen
- "Women Of Paris!" – Marie, Orleans, Ensemble (Citizens)
- "God Cares For All" – Lamballe
- "Onward Brothers" – Ensemble (Citizens)
- "We Go With The Flow" – Rose, Leonard
- "Reign Of Terror" – Margrid, Orleans, Ensemble (Revolutionaries)
- "Hate In Your Eyes" – Marie, Margrid
- "All I Do (Reprise)" – Marie, Fersen
- "She's In Love" – Margrid
- "The Flight" – Louis, Rose, Leonard, Ensemble
- "Why Can't Be A Smith (Reprise)" – Louis
- "Turn, Turn (Reprise)" – Marie, Margrid
- "Lamballe’s Death" – Ensemble (Revolutionaries)
- "Onward Brothers" – Ensemble (Revolutionaries)
- "Life Has Made You Hard And Bitter" – Fersen
- "Turn, Turn (Reprise)" – Marie
- "The Only Thing I Ever Did Right (Reprise)" – Marie, Fersen
- "Taking Away Her Son" – Marie, Margrid, Hebert, Orleans
- "The Trial" – Marie, Margrid, Ensemble (Revolutionaries)
- "Her Head Must Roll!" – Margrid, Ensemble (Revolutionaries)
- "The Execution" – Ensemble (Revolutionaries)
- "Marie Antoinette (Reprise)" – Fersen
- "How Can We Change The World" – Company
