= Yoshio Inoue =

Japanese actor and singer (born 1979)

- 井上芳雄
- Born: July 6, 1979 (age 47); Fukuoka, Japan
- Education: Tokyo University of the Arts
- Occupations: Actor; singer
- Years active: 2000–present
- Agent(s): Grand-Arts CO., Ltd
- Known for: Elisabeth; Mozart!
- Spouse: Rina Chinen (m. 2016)
- Children: 2
- Website: Grand-Arts Website

Yoshio Inoue (井上 芳雄, Inoue Yoshio; born 6 July 1979), is a Japanese actor and singer, best known for his performances in musical theatre.

In 2000 while he was studying Vocal Music in the Tokyo University of the Arts, he made his musical theatre debut as Rudolf in Elisabeth at the Imperial Theatre. He continued to perform in numerous musicals and stage play, including the title role in Mozart! since 2002, as Chris in Miss Saigon in 2004 and 2009, as Bill in Me and My Girl in 2006 and 2009, and as Jervis in Daddy Long Legs since 2012. Since 2015 he played Der Tod in Elisabeth.

Alongside his theatrical career, Inoue also appeared in films and television dramas and presented in live shows and television music programs.

In 2013, he formed StarS, a musical unit with Kenji Urai and Ikusaburo Yamazaki.

== Personal life ==
Inoue is married to actress Rina Chinen on 27 July 2016. They have two children, an elder son from Chinen's previous marriage and a second son born on 12 June 2018.

== Performance credits ==
=== Stage ===
Year	Title	Role	Notes	Ref.
2000	Elisabeth	Rudolf		
2002	Mozart!	Wolfgang Amadeus Mozart		
2003	Hamlet	Hamlet		
2004	Miss Saigon	Chris		
2006	Me and My Girl	Bill		
2012	Daddy Long Legs	Jervis Pendleton		
2013	A Tale of Two Cities	Sydney Carton		
2015	Elisabeth	Der Tod		
2016	Arcadia	Septimus Hodge		
2018	Knights' Tale	Palamon	Musical based on The Two Noble Kinsmen	
2022	Guys and Dolls	Sky Masterson		
2023–2024	Moulin Rouge	Christian		

=== Television ===
Year	Title	Role	Notes	Ref.
2025	Unbound	Jippensha Ikku	Taiga drama	

=== Voice acting ===
Year	Title	Role	Notes	Ref.
2017	Sword Art Online The Movie: Ordinal Scale	Eiji		
2019	My Hero Academia: Heroes Rising	Nine		
2023	Sword Art Online: Last Recollection	Eiji		
2024	Sword Art Online: Fractured Daydream	Eiji		
