= Annie Warbucks =

1993 Off-Broadway musical

- Original cast recording
- Music: Charles Strouse
- Lyrics: Martin Charnin
- Book: Thomas Meehan
- Basis: Little Orphan Annie (comic strip); Annie the Musical (1977)
- Productions: 1993 Off-Broadway

Annie Warbucks is a musical with a book by Thomas Meehan, music by Charles Strouse, and lyrics by Martin Charnin. A sequel to the 1977 Tony Award-winning hit Annie, based on Harold Gray's Little Orphan Annie comic strip, it begins immediately after Annie ends.

== Premise ==
On Christmas morning in 1933, Child Welfare Commissioner Harriet Doyle (replacing the original's Miss Hannigan as the villain of the piece) arrives on the scene to inform Daddy Warbucks he must marry within sixty days or else the child will be returned to the orphanage. Daddy Warbucks' whirlwind search for a fitting bride uncovers not only a plot by Doyle and her daughter Sheila Kelly to strip him of his fortune, but also his true feelings for his long-time assistant, Grace Farrell. A gaggle of cute little girls seeking parents and President Franklin D. Roosevelt return to take part in the shenanigans.

== Background ==
Annie Warbucks was the second attempt at an Annie sequel. The first, entitled Annie 2: Miss Hannigan's Revenge, opened on December 22, 1989, at the John F. Kennedy Center for the Performing Arts in Washington, D.C., to universally dismal reviews. Extensive efforts to get it into shape for a Broadway opening failed, and the project was abandoned.

== Production history ==
Annie Warbucks was developed in a workshop at the Goodspeed Opera House, directed by Charnin and choreographed by Peter Gennaro and under the direction of Michael P. Price, Executive Director. The musical played several out-of-town tryouts, starting at the Marriott Lincolnshire, Chicago in February through April 1992 and then the Drury Lane in Oak Brook, Illinois, followed by a five city United States tour, including San Diego in October 1992.

It was originally planned that Annie Warbucks would open on Broadway, but a "major investor pulled out". Some characters were cut and the budget reduced, leading to delays. The Off-Broadway production opened on August 9, 1993, Produced by Ben Sprecher, William Miller and Dennis Grimaldi, at the Variety Arts Theatre. Lighting design by Ken Billington. The cast included Harve Presnell as Warbucks, Donna McKechnie as Sheila Kelly, and Kathryn Zaremba in the title role. The show broke all off-Broadway box office records for the time, running for 200 performances.

The producers considered moving the show from the Variety Arts Theater to Broadway, and they secured $2.5 million from an investor for a move to Broadway, but discovered they couldn't make the move in time to be eligible for Tony Award consideration, which was a big part of the reason for moving in the first place. A provision in the Tony rules required that a show had to transfer to a Tony-eligible theatre within 30 weeks of its original opening in order to qualify for any nominations. The investor pulled out, ending the plans.

== Reception ==
Annie Warbucks received a strongly positive review from The New York Times, with David Richards writing, "Kathryn Zaremba, can deliver a punch line and tug a heartstring with the best of them. Her face is that of the littlest angel; her resilience that of a dead-end kid. If no one else in the cast of "Annie Warbucks" lifted a finger, Miss Zaremba would still carry the show over the finish line on her tiny shoulders of steel....Happily, the evidence of busy fingers is everywhere. Charles Strouse's score—full of peppy melodies and bright banjo rhythms—is one of the composer's best....There are plenty of laughs in the book by Thomas Meehan and the lyrics by Martin Charnin, who also functions as the remarkably clear-eyed director.... Bravely blinking back tears, Ms. (Donna) McKechnie explains that life deals you a lousy hand, "But You Go On," and proceeds to build the first-act torch song to a blaze. . Ms. McKechnie is in great form. ..."Annie Warbucks" provides enough of the familiar fun to qualify as more than a postscript. The predisposed shouldn't be disappointed, while the wary may well be won over."

== Musical numbers ==
Act 1

- "Overture" - Orchestra
- "A New Deal for Christmas" - All
- "Annie Ain't Just Annie Anymore" - Annie, Warbucks, Grace, Drake, The Staff
- "Above the Law" - Commissioner Doyle
- "Changes" - Warbucks, Annie
- "The Other Woman" - The Orphans
- "The Other Woman (reprise)" - The Orphans
- "That's the Kind of Woman" - Drake, Annie, Warbucks, Servants
- "A Younger Man" - Warbucks
- "But You Go On" - Mrs. Kelly
- "Above the Law (reprise)" - Commissioner Doyle, Mrs. Kelly
- "I Got Me" - Annie, The Orphans
- "I Got Me (reprise)" - Annie

Act 2

- "Love" - Ella
- "Love (reprise)" - Annie, C.G.
- "Somebody's Gotta Do Somethin'" - Annie, The Patersons, Roosevelt, Grace, The White House Staff
- "Leave It to the Girls" - Commissioner Doyle, Mrs. Kelly
- "All Dolled Up" - The Orphans, Annie, Warbucks, Grace, Roosevelt, The Patersons, Drake, The Staff
- "The Tenement Lullaby" - Mrs. Kelly
- "It Would Have Been Wonderful" - Grace
- "When You Smile" - Warbucks, Annie
- "Wedding, Wedding" - Company
- "I Always Knew" - Annie
