= Rebecca (musical) =

2006 musical

- Poster of Rebecca
- Music: Sylvester Levay
- Lyrics: Michael Kunze (German lyrics and English lyrics); Christopher Hampton (English lyrics)
- Book: Michael Kunze (German book and English book); Christopher Hampton (English book)
- Setting: Cornwall
- Basis: Rebecca by Daphne du Maurier
- Premiere: 28 September 2006: Raimund Theater, Vienna
- Productions: 2006 Vienna; 2008 Tokyo; 2008 Finland; 2013 Korea; Other European productions 2023 London
- Awards: 5 Annual Musical Awards (2013, Korea)

Rebecca is a musical adaptation of the 1938 novel of the same name by Daphne du Maurier. It was composed by Sylvester Levay with German book and lyrics by Michael Kunze. The plot, which adheres closely to the original novel, revolves around wealthy Maxim DeWinter, his naïve new wife, called "I" ("Ich" in the German version), and Mrs. Danvers, the manipulative housekeeper of DeWinter's Cornish estate Manderley. Mrs. Danvers resents the new wife's intrusion and persuades her that she is an unworthy replacement for DeWinter's first wife, the glamorous and mysterious Rebecca, who perished in a drowning accident. The new Mrs. DeWinter struggles to find her identity and take control of her life among the shadows left by Rebecca.

The musical premiered on 28 September 2006 at the Raimund Theater in Vienna, Austria, where it ran for three years. Subsequent productions have been mounted in Finland, Korea, Japan and elsewhere in Europe. The first English-language production, in a translation by Christopher Hampton and Kunze, began on 4 September and ended on 18 November 2023 at the Charing Cross Theatre in London.

== Background ==
As a teenager, Michael Kunze had read Daphne du Maurier's novel Rebecca. In the 1990s, he re-read it and decided that the story would make a good musical. He traveled to Cornwall, England, to find du Maurier's son in an attempt to obtain the rights to musicalize the work, which had been denied to other librettists. Attending a performance of Kunze's long-running 1992 musical Elisabeth in Vienna persuaded du Maurier's son that the novel would be in good hands with Kunze and his musical partner Sylvester Levay.

Writing the libretto took Kunze nearly two years, and Levay took another two years to compose the music. A 2003 demo recording in English was made, with Pia Douwes as Mrs. Danvers, Maike Boerdam as "I" and Uwe Kröger as Maxim de Winter. Workshops were also presented in Essen and Vienna.

Kunze and Levay brought in American director Francesca Zambello and English set designer Peter J. Davison. In early 2005, they decided to launch the musical in Vienna, Austria, with the production company Vereinigte Bühnen Wien, which had previously produced Kunze's musicals Elisabeth, Tanz der Vampire (Dance of the Vampires), and Mozart!.

== Synopsis ==
=== Act I ===
A young English woman, "I", dreams of her husband's family manor, Manderley, a burned ruin ("Ich hab geträumt von Manderley"). She reflects on the events that set Manderley's ruin into motion. In a hotel in Monte Carlo years earlier, in April 1926, she is employed as a traveling companion by a wealthy American, Mrs. Van Hopper ("Du wirst niemals eine Lady"). The widowed aristocrat Maxim de Winter arrives at the hotel; he initially treats the young woman coolly but later explains to her that his actual aversion was to Mrs. Van Hopper. As the two become increasingly friendly, the hotel guests speculate about the nature of their relationship, their differences in age and class, and Maxim's devotion to his late wife, Rebecca ("Er verlor unerwartet seine Frau, Rebecca"). In the hills near Monte Carlo, Maxim and the young woman share a kiss; she is distraught when Mrs. Van Hopper informs her that they will be returning to New York but resolves to find joy and strength in her memories of Maxim ("Zeit in einer Flasche"). Maxim witnesses her private outpouring of emotion, and he proposes marriage. Disregarding Mrs. Van Hopper's warnings that she cannot live up to her predecessor, she elopes with Maxim ("Zauberhaft natürlich").

As the servants of Manderley welcome Maxim and his bride from their honeymoon, they speculate about their new mistress and the cold greeting afforded to her by the haughty head housekeeper, Mrs. Danvers ("Die neue Mrs. de Winter"). While tending to Rebecca's orchids, Mrs. Danvers privately laments the loss of her beautiful, elegant and mysterious mistress ("Sie ergibt sich nicht"); when Mrs. de Winter accidentally intrudes upon her, Mrs. Danvers intimidates the young woman by showing her Rebecca's extensive social calendar. Mrs. de Winter's introduction to Maxim's sister Beatrice and brother-in-law Giles goes well ("Die lieben Verwandten"), but Mrs. Danvers provokes an argument between the newlyweds ("Bist du glücklich – Bist du böse"), who each reflect privately about how they are seeking solace in each other ("Hilf mir durch die Nacht"). At her house, Beatrice reflects on her affection for her brother and how he has changed in the past year ("Was ist nur los mit ihm"). Rebecca's cousin Jack Favell comes to Manderley as a guest; although he and Mrs. Danvers share a private understanding of Rebecca's inner life, his entitlement to Rebecca's possessions and insistence that she loved him upsets Mrs. Danvers ("Sie war gewohnt geliebt zu werden"). Upon encountering Favell, Mrs. de Winter is persuaded to keep the knowledge of his presence at Manderley from Maxim. In preparation for an upcoming masked ball, Mrs. Danvers suggests that Mrs. de Winter wear a ball gown in homage to a portrait of one of Maxim's ancestors; although her overt hostility to the young woman subsides, she continues to reverently describe Maxim's first wife and even her belongings ("Rebecca").

Ben, an intellectually disabled man, meets Mrs. de Winter in the Manderley boat house ("Sie's fort") and compares her favorably to Rebecca, describing her predecessor as vindictive and cruel. Upon learning that his wife is at the boathouse, Maxim flies into an inexplicable fury and expresses his anger that Rebecca's absence continues to cast a shadow over his marriage ("Gott, warum"). When Mrs. de Winter voices her insecurities to Frank Crawley, the manager of the estate and Maxim's best friend, he reassures her that she doesn't need to try to emulate Rebecca's social accomplishments ("Ehrlichkeit und vertrauen"). At the ball ("Der Ball von Manderley"), Mrs. Van Hopper performs ("I'm an American Woman"). As Mrs. de Winter changes into the ball gown suggested by Mrs. Danvers, she hopes that she will impress both the guests and Maxim ("Heut' nacht verzauber' ich die Welt"), but as she descends the staircase to the party, the guests look on in horror; the dress Mrs. de Winter is wearing is the same one Rebecca had worn at last year's ball. Maxim bursts into a rage, his bride flees the ball in tears, and Mrs. Danvers looks on malevolently.

=== Act II ===
The following evening, Mrs. de Winter attempts to explain herself ("Und das, und das, und das"), only to be menaced by Mrs. Danvers ("Tu nicht, was sie empört!" ... "Nur ein schritt"). At the seaside, the people of Cornwall find the wreck of Rebecca's sailing boat with her body inside the cabin ("Strandgut"). Mrs. de Winter encounters Ben and a disheveled Maxim, who had gone to help the sailors; Maxim explains to his wife that Rebecca was a deceitful person who manipulated him into marriage and had multiple affairs. When Maxim confronted Rebecca about her incestuous affair with Jack Favell, an altercation ensued in which Maxim pushed Rebecca, causing her to suffer a concussion and die; in a panic, he took her body to the boat and scuttled it ("Kein Lächenln war je so kalt"). Maxim is suspected of having killed Rebecca, and his implausible alibi leads to an official investigation of his involvement in her murder. Mrs. de Winter comforts a terrified Beatrice, who remarks on her sister-in-law's strength and courage (Die Stärker Einer Frau). A newly confident Mrs. de Winter redecorates Manderley to her own tastes, brushing aside the furious comments of a shocked Mrs. Danvers ("Mrs. de Winter bin Ich").

At a preliminary hearing, Maxim responds poorly to a line of questioning by the local coroner. Mrs. de Winter faints, prompting Maxim and his supporters' return to Manderley. Jack Favell arrives in their wake and is welcomed into the library by Mrs. Danvers ("Eine Hand wäscht die andre"); he attempts to blackmail Maxim with a letter from Rebecca, expressing her love for Favell and fear of Maxim. Mrs. Danvers provides Rebecca's diary, which reveals that she had seen a doctor on the day she died. Favell speculates that Rebecca was pregnant with his child, and that Maxim killed her in a jealous rage. Mrs. de Winter travels to London to visit the doctor Rebecca had seen, while Maxim is ordered to stay at Manderley until the truth is ascertained. The servants and Mrs. Danvers comment on the situation ("Sie fuhr'n um acht"). Maxim receives a phone call from his wife, overheard by Mrs. Danvers; Mrs. de Winter explains that Rebecca was suffering from terminal cancer and likely provoked Maxim to murder her so she could avert the slow and painful death she dreaded.

Now cleared of all charges, Maxim meets his wife at the train station in Cornwall, and they reunite passionately ("Jenseits der Nacht"). As they approach Manderley, they see a red glow in the distance and realize that the manor has been set on fire by Mrs. Danvers to destroy the evidence against her. As the servants attempt to extinguish the blaze ("Manderley in Flammen"), Mrs. Danvers stands atop the grand staircase, holding Rebecca's nightgown and setting the handrails on fire. The de Winters arrive in time to help evacuate Manderley, but the house collapses and Mrs. Danvers perishes.

Mrs. de Winter walks dreamily in darkness, reflecting on how she has grown from her experiences ("Ich hab getraumt von Manderley" (reprise)); the shadows of Manderley now have faces, and her fears have vanished. Under a bright blue sky, Maxim holds his hand out to his wife, and they kiss.

== Productions ==
=== Vienna ===
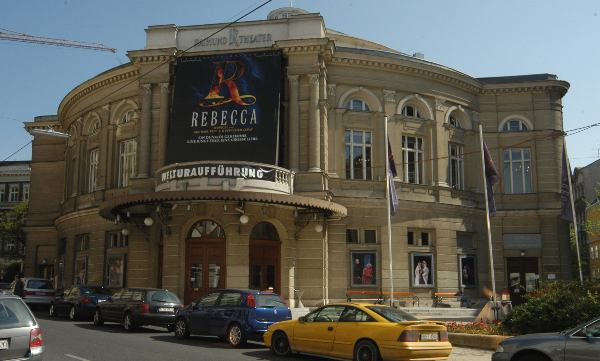
Musical Rebecca in Vienna

Rebecca premiered at the Raimund Theater in Vienna, in German, in September 2006, "where it played to sold-out houses totaling more than three years". It was directed by Zambello and choreographed by Denni L. Sayers, with production design by Davison, costumes by Birgit Hutter and lighting by Andrew Voller. The cast starred Wietske van Tongeren as "Ich" ("I"), Uwe Kröger as Maxim and Susan Rigvava-Dumas as Mrs. Danvers. Variety magazine considered the Vienna production a "dream of a show", adding:

Michael Kunze and Sylvester Levay deliver a work every bit as compelling as their hit Elisabeth, the most successful German-language musical of all time, while Zambello's dazzling, cinematic production offers storytelling at its best, clearly defining the whirlpool of emotions experienced by the three tortured principal characters. ... Kunze's deft lyrics take us deep into the psyches of the never-named heroine (simply called "I"); moody, mercurial Maxim de Winter; obsessive Mrs. Danvers; and even the late Rebecca herself. Levay knows how to write tunes that jam in your head; he delivers the goods with Mrs. Danvers' haunting "Rebecca" and the anthem "The Power of a Woman in Love". ... Designer Peter J. Davison stunningly captures the atmosphere, from heady summer nights on the Riviera to the oppressive decay of Manderley.

Wietske Van Tongeren has all the endearing pipsqueak qualities to make the nameless heroine endearing, expertly conveying the slow transformation from little brown mouse to confident, strong woman. Her performance is marred only by her screechy pop vocal production. ... Kroger has built a substantial career on his pretty-boy looks. As Maxim, they work against him: He seems too young, too fey, too lightweight for such a haunted, world-weary character. His singing, while impassioned, is merely adequate, but he rises to the challenge of confessing his hatred for Rebecca in "No Smile Was Ever as Cold". ... Mrs. Danvers gets the best music, and in Susan Rigvava-Dumas has found a perfect interpreter. ... With a rich mezzo-soprano as her weapon, she embodies evil born of passion and jealousy in a multi-layered turn.

Reviewing the Vienna production on a night when an understudy was playing the protagonist "I", the critic of The Times, Benedict Nightingale, praised the fidelity of the plot to du Maurier's original and rated the staging "up to the most lavish West End visual standards. ... Only the shipwreck that leads to the discovery of Rebecca's body disappoints – and only a gallumphingly Wodehousean golfing number (Wir Sind Britisch) needs excising." Nightingale judged the ending of the musical "forgivably ... a bit more upbeat than the novel's." He found the dancing dull and the music "seldom harsh or imaginative enough" despite "a terrific central song, a soaring, grieving tribute" to Rebecca by "Susan Rigvava Dumas's mesmeric Danvers". He said of Kröger's Max, "though white-hot at moments of crisis, [he] hasn't quite the mix of brooding inwardness and outer sang froid the character needs."

=== 2008 Japan ===
Rebecca was next produced at the Imperial Theatre in Tokyo, opening on 6 April 2008. There were Tokyo revivals in 2010, 2018–2019 and 2026 in Tokyo, and touring productions.

=== Europe ===
The musical was performed in Helsinki, Finland, at the Helsingin kaupunginteatteri (Helsinki City Theatre) from 28 August 2008 to 9 May 2009, as well as in Kouvola, Finland, at the Kouvolan Teatteri from 11 September 2010. Rebecca played in Budapest, Hungary, in March 2010 (and later in repertory), and in Szeged in July-August 2024.

In February 2014 the musical played in Malmö, Sweden at Malmö Opera. The director was Åsa Melldahl, and the musical director was Anders Eljas. Productions have also played in Stuttgart, Germany; St. Gallen, Switzerland; Moscow, Russia; Belgrade, Serbia; Bucharest, Romania; Ostrava, Czechia; and Plzeň, Czech Republic.

=== UK and US readings and fundraising fraud ===
In 2009, Ben Sprecher co-produced two English-language readings of Rebecca, hoping to mount West End and Broadway productions of the musical. The first, in October 2009, featured Sierra Boggess as "I", Brent Barrett as Maxim and Pia Douwes as Mrs. Danvers. The English-language book was written by Christopher Hampton in collaboration with Kunze. The other reading took place in March 2011 in New York, directed by Michael Blakemore and Zambello. The cast featured Boggess as "I", Hugh Panaro as Maxim, Carolee Carmello as Mrs. Danvers and James Barbour as Jack Favell.

A Broadway production was announced twice during 2012, to be co-directed by Blakemore and Zambello and choreographed by Graciela Daniele. However, the producers cancelled both times after financing for the production fell through, even though there were $1 million in advance ticket sales. In October 2012, The New York Times reported that four of the "investors" in the proposed Broadway production never existed. Following criminal investigations by the FBI and federal prosecutors in Manhattan, Mark Hotton, the middleman who fabricated the fictitious investors, and received $60,000 in fees, was arrested and charged with fraud. In January 2013, Sprecher told an interviewer that he hoped to mount the show on Broadway later in 2013. Although the Securities and Exchange Commission pursued no action against Sprecher and his partner, they were unable to raise enough funding for a Broadway opening. On 24 April 2017, during a trial in New York State, concerning losses from the aborted production, it was announced that Sprecher and Louise Forlenza had lost the rights to produce the show and would not pursue a Broadway run.

=== 2013 Korea ===
Rebecca premiered in Korea in January 2013, and was met with both critical and commercial success. The cast included Yoo Jun-sang, Ryu Jung-han, and Oh Man-seok as Maxim, Lim Hye-young and Kim Bo-kyung as "I", and Ock Joo-hyun and Shin Young-sook as Mrs. Danvers. In the 2013 7th Annual Musical Awards, the production won 5 awards, with Ock Joo-hyun as the Best Featured Actress, Robert Johanson as the Best Director, Jung Seung-Ho as the Best Scenic Designer, Jack Mehler as the Best Lighting Designer, and Kim Ji-Hyeon as the Best Sound Designer.

=== 2022 Vienna revival ===
A revival of the musical opened at the Raimund Theater in Vienna in September 2022. The cast included Willemijn Verkaik as Mrs. Danvers, Nienke Latten as "Ich", Mark Seibert as Maxim, Annemieke van Dam as Mrs. Danvers, Boris Pfeifer as Jack, Ana Milva Gomes as Mrs. Van Hopper and James Park as Frank; Zambello again directed. The opening was met with enthusiasm The production closed in June 2023.

=== 2023 London ===
The off West End Charing Cross Theatre staged the first English-language production from 4 September 2023 until 18 November. A smaller-scale production than the Viennese premiere, with an orchestra of 18, it was directed by Alejandro Bonatto in Hampton and Kunze's English translation. The cast includes Kara Lane as Danvers, Lauren Jones as "I" (Emily Apps played the role in early performances due to Jones's illness), Richard Carson as Maxim and Alex James-Ward as Jack Favell. The production received mixed reviews, with many critics expressing disappointment with the direction, the pacing of the plot, and the scope of the production; the acting, however, received praise.

== Characters and cast ==
Character	Vienna (2006)
I	Wietske van Tongeren
Maxim de Winter	Uwe Kröger
Mrs. Danvers	Susan Rigvava-Dumas
Jack Favell	Carsten Lepper
Frank Crawley	André Bauer
Beatrice	Kerstin Ibald
Ben	Norberto Bertassi
Mrs. Van Hopper	Carin Filipčić

== Songs in the original production ==
This list includes a literal translation of the German song titles into English

Act I

- Ich hab geträumt von Manderley ("Ich", Shadows) – I dreamt of Manderley
- Du wirst niemals eine Lady (Mrs. van Hopper, "Ich") – You will never be a lady!
- Er verlor unerwartet seine Frau Rebecca (Ensemble) – He lost his wife Rebecca unexpectedly
- Am Abgrund ("Ich", Maxim) – At the abyss
- Zeit in einer Flasche ("Ich") – Time in a bottle
- Hochzeit (Instrumental) – Wedding
- Zauberhaft Natürlich (Maxim)- Naturally Enchanting ¥
- Die neue Mrs. de Winter (Ensemble, Mrs. Danvers, Crawley) – The new Mrs. de Winter
- Sie ergibt sich nicht (Mrs. Danvers) – She won't surrender
- Die lieben Verwandten (Beatrice, "Ich", Giles) – The dear relatives
- Bist Du glücklich? ("Ich", Maxim) – Are you happy?
- Bist Du böse? ("Ich", Maxim) – Are you angry?
- Hilf mir durch die Nacht ("Ich", Maxim) – Help me through the night
- Was ist nur los mit ihm? (Beatrice) – What's wrong with him?
- Sie war gewohnt, geliebt zu werden (Mrs. Danvers, Favell) – She was used to being loved
- Rebecca - Version 1 (Mrs. Danvers, Ensemble)
- Wir sind britisch (Ensemble) – We are British#
- Sie's fort (Ben) – She's gone
- Gott, warum? (Maxim) – God, why?
- Ehrlichkeit und Vertrauen (Crawley) – Honesty and trust
- Ball von Manderley (Ensemble) – The Ball at Manderley^
- I'm an American Woman (Mrs. van Hopper)
- Heut Nacht verzaubere ich die Welt ("Ich", Clarice) – Tonight I'm going to enchant the world
- Finale Erster Akt (Mrs. Danvers & Ensemble) – Finale: Act One

Act II

- Entr'acte
- Und Das und Das und Das ("Ich") – And this and this and this
- Rebecca - Version 2 (Mrs. Danvers, "Ich", Shadows)
- Nur ein Schritt (Mrs. Danvers) – Just one step
- Strandgut (Ensemble, "Ich", Crawley, Favell) – Flotsam and jetsam
- Sie's fort – Reprise (Ben)
- Du liebst sie zu sehr ("Ich") – You love her too much
- Kein Lächeln war je so kalt (Maxim) – Never was a smile that cold
- Die Stärke einer Frau (Beatrice, "Ich") – The power of a woman
- Die Neue Mrs. de Winter – Reprise (Ensemble)
- Mrs. de Winter bin Ich! ("Ich", Mrs. Danvers) – I am Mrs. de Winter!
- Die Voruntersuchung (Ensemble) – The Enquiry
- Eine Hand wäscht die andre Hand (Favell) – One Hand washes the other^
- Sie's fort – Reprise (Ben)
- Sie fuhr'n um Acht (Ensemble) – They drove at eight o'clock
- Keiner hat Sie durchschaut (Maxim) – No one saw through her
- Rebecca – Reprise (Mrs. Danvers, Shadows)
- Jenseits der Nacht ("Ich", Maxim) – Beyond the night^
- Manderley in Flammen (Maxim, Mrs.Danvers, Ensemble, Crawley) – Manderley in Flames
- Ich hab geträumt von Manderley ("Ich", Shadows) – I dreamt of Manderley

1. -Replaced with the song Merkwürdig, where the servants make fun of "Ich", in the St. Gallen and subsequent productions

¥-Written for the 2010 Japan production and used in all productions afterwards

^-Shortened for the Stuttgart production

== Recordings ==
The original Vienna cast recording, Rebecca – Das Cast Album, a studio recording, was released on 24 November 2006. It has 22 tracks. It peaked number 18 on the Ö3 Austria Top 75 album chart.

One of the songs from the show, "The Power of a Woman in Love", was released in English, as a single sung by Gloria Gaynor, prior to the Viennese premiere.

Rebecca – Gesamtaufnahme Live (Rebecca – Complete Recording Live) was recorded on 6 and 7 June 2007. The 2-CD live recording was released on 19 October 2007. Its 44 tracks include the entire production, including all spoken dialogue and songs. The recording also includes a bonus track: Marika Lichter, who performed Mrs. Van Hopper from the summer of 2007 through the end of 2007, singing "I'm an American Woman".

Rebecca – Original Japanese Cast Recording was released on 5 March 2010. The CD has 10 tracks, including "Zauberhaft Natürlich", which was written for this production.

Rebecca – Original Hungarian Cast Recording was released on 22 May 2010. It includes 16 tracks.

Rebecca – Gesamtaufnahme Live was recorded in 2012, this time with the Stuttgart cast featuring Valerie Link as "Ich", Jan Amman as Maxim de Winter, Pia Douwes as Mrs. Danvers, and Kerstin Ibald reprising her role as Beatrice
