= Maya Hakvoort =

Dutch musical actress (born 1966)

Hakvoort, October 2006

Maya Hakvoort (born 19 September 1966 in Nijmegen) is a Dutch musical actress.

Maya Hakvoort studied singing at the conservatory of Maastricht and acting and dancing at the Kleinkunst-academy in Amsterdam, before she started gathering practical musical experience in the Netherlands, Germany, Austria and Belgium.

She debuted in the theatre show "Jeans" in 1989. After various roles in "Chicago", Les Misérables and "Gaudí", she was cast as Empress Elisabeth in the German-language musical Elisabeth in Vienna in 1994, replacing Pia Douwes.

Through playing the title role in Elisabeth she gained recognition throughout Europe. In 1999 she played Fantine in Les Misérables in Duisburg, Germany. Then she played the part of "Rose" in "Aspects of Love" in Bern, Switzerland. As the Swiss didn't want to let her go, she played Milady de Winter in George Stiles "The Three Musketiers" in St Gallen. Back in her homeland she toured with "There's no business like Showbusiness", before she went back to Vienna to play the role of Lisa in Frank Wildhorns "Jekyll and Hyde". Ten months after giving birth to her first child she reprised the role of "Elisabeth" in Elisabeth at Theater an der Wien in 2003.

On New Year's Eve 2004, Hakvoort started touring through Austria, Italy and Germany with her own solo tour: "Maya Goes Solo". After her last performance on 5 December 2005, she started in 2006 in Baden as "Evita".

In the spring of 2007, Hakvoort and some of her colleagues of the United Stages of Vienna went to Japan to perform the musical Elisabeth there. By then, she had played the role of "Elisabeth" more than 1000 times.

On 12 October 2007, her new solo tour "In My Life" premiered in Vienna.

In 2008 the comedy Musical "High Society" as Tracy showed the audience that she had a comic talent.

In the beginning of 2009, "Lilly Vanessy" in Kiss me Kate in Vienna.

After her second child, she was cast by entertainer/singer and producer Alfons Haider in the summer of 2010 for the main role in "Victor/Victoria" in Stockerau.

In October 2010, she made her way again to St. Gallen to play the evil "Mrs Danvers" in Daphne du Mauriers "Rebecca".

After her 3 Programm "Maya's musical Life" she wanted to be accompanied by a big band, so she created a new show, "This is my Life" with 10 Musicians.

In 2012, she went back to Japan, where she had her finishing night of "Elisabeth".

In 2013, she produced "Voices of Musical" with Uwe Kröger, Pia Douwes, Lukas, Perman, Marjan Shaki, Ramesh Nair, Sophisticated Showdance Compagny, and The Rounder Girls. She played her Première in Mörbisch on 30 July 2013. Her second show on August 31st in Bregenz.

The Voices of Musical Christmas played in the winter of 2013 in Graz, Linz, Vienna and Bregenz.

== Discography ==
- Elisabeth - live 1996
- In Love with Musical - live 1996
- Musical Christmas in Vienna 1996
- Musicalstars singen Weihnachtslieder 1996
- Ihr Männer 1997
- Shades of Night 1997
- That's Musical 1999
- Musical Changes 2000
- Duettalbum van Marco Bakker 2000
- There's No Business Like Showbusiness - live 2000
- Jekyll & Hyde - Wiener Productie 2002
- 10th Anniversary Concert Elisabeth 2002
- Elisabeth (5 Tracks) 2003
- Schlaraffenland 2003
- Elisabeth - 2004
- Musical Christmas in Vienna 2004
- Maya Goes Solo - 2005
- In My Life - 2008
