= Ikusaburo Yamazaki =

Japanese actor and singer

- 山崎 育三郎
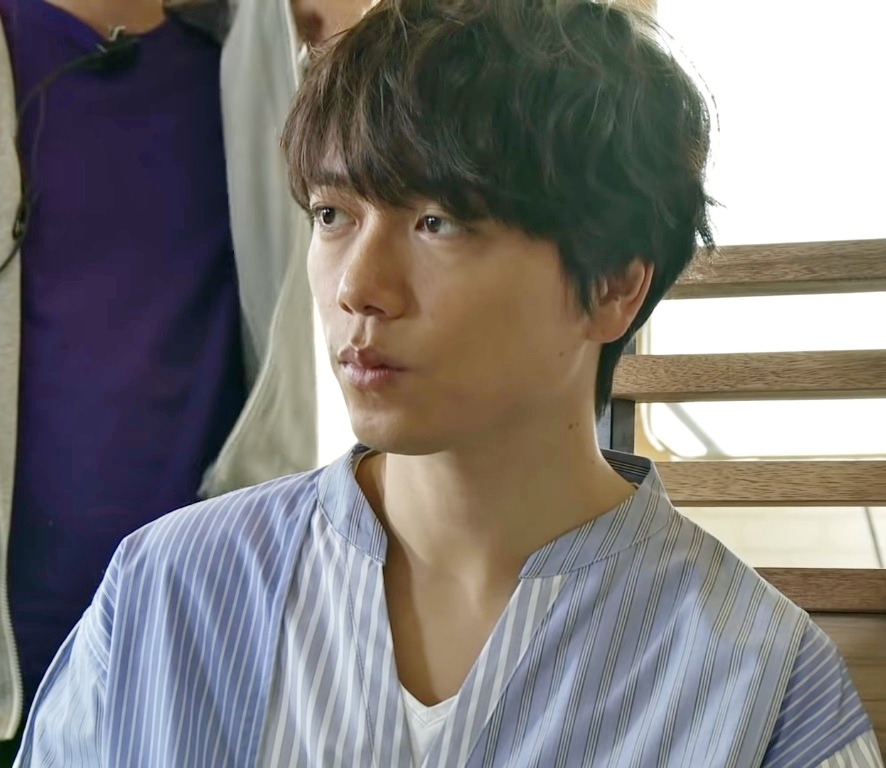
- Yamazaki in 2019
- Born: January 18, 1986 (age 40); Tokyo, Japan
- Occupations: Actor; singer
- Years active: 1998–present
- Agent: Ken-On
- Known for: Shitamachi Rocket; Les Misérables; Roméo et Juliette; Mozart!
- Height: 1.77 m (5 ft 10 in)
- Spouse: Natsumi Abe (m. 2015)
- Children: 3
- Awards: 36th Kazuo Kikuta Theater Award (Mozart!)
- Website: Official website

Ikusaburo Yamazaki (山崎 育三郎, Yamazaki Ikusaburō; born January 18, 1986, in Tokyo, Japan) is a Japanese actor and singer who is represented by Ken-On.

== Personal life ==
Yamazaki married singer and actress Natsumi Abe in December 2015. The couple has three sons. Their first child was born on 27 July 2016, their second child on 31 October 2018, and their third child on 27 December 2022, respectively.

== Filmography ==
=== Stage ===
Year	Title	Role	Notes	Ref.
1998	Argo Musical	Perumo		
1998	Trapp Family Story	Werner		
1999	Koko Smile	Quinta		
2007	Les Misérables	Marius		
2008	La Cage aux Folles	Jean-Michel		
2009	Break Through!	Yoshida		
2010	Last Game: Saigo no Sōkei-sen	Handle Name Waseda / Shinichiro Aimoto	Special appearance	
2010	Mozart!	Wolfgang Amadeus Mozart	Lead role	
2011	Wuthering Heights	Edgar		
2011	Roméo et Juliette	Romeo	Lead role	
2011	Dance of the Vampires	Alfred		
2012	The 1st Shop of Coffee Prince	Choe Hangyeol		
2012	Miss Saigon	Chris		
2012	Night on the Galactic Railroad			
2013	Fune ni Nore!	Satoru	Lead role	
2014	Lady Bess	Robin Blake		
2015	Elisabeth	Luigi Lucheni		
2016	Priscilla, Queen of the Desert	Mitch		
2025	Musical Shōwa Genroku Rakugo Shinjū	Yūrakutei Sukeroku II (Hatsutarō)		

=== Dramas ===
Year	Title	Role	Network	Notes	Ref.
2000	Rokubanme no Sayoko	Akihiko Kato	NHK G		
2015	The Last Cop	Mitsuteru Ando	NTV		
2015	Shitamachi Rocket	Kensaku Mano	TBS		
2016	Otōsan to Yobasete	Makoto Sunashimizu	KTV, Fuji TV		
2016	Akutō-tachi wa Senri o Hashiru	Yuto Sonobe	TBS		
2017	Kenji Miyazawa's Table	Katōji Fujiwara	Wowow		
2018	Showa Genroku Rakugo Shinju	Yūrakutei Sukeroku II (Hatsutarō)	NHK G		
2019	Shiroi Kyotō	Kōichirō Kunihira	TV Asahi		
2020	Yell	Hisashi Satō	NHK G	Asadora	
2020	Cursed in Love	Kaoru Takigawa	NTV		
2021	Reach Beyond the Blue Sky	Itō Hirobumi	NHK G	Taiga drama	
2021	Ichikei's Crow: The Criminal Court Judges	Iori Ide	Fuji TV		
2022	DCU: Deep Crime Unit	Kenji Shimizu	TBS		

=== Films ===
Year	Title	Role	Notes	Ref.
2008	Natsuyasumi no Yōna 1-kagetsu	Shintaro Karasawa		
2018	Reon	Kusaka		
2019	Detective Conan: The Fist of Blue Sapphire	Leon Lowe (voice)		
2020	Kaiji: Final Game	Keishi Nishino		
2021	Musicophilia	Taisei Kishino		
2022	Radiation House: The Movie	Keisuke Takahashi		
2023	Ichikei's Crow: The Movie	Iori Ide		
2023	Confess to Your Crimes	Nobuki Hirao		

=== Anime ===
Year	Title	Role	Network	Notes	Ref.
1998	Ojarumaru	Hoshino	NHK E TV		
2000	Carried by the Wind: Tsukikage Ran	Shinnosuke	Wowow	Episode 11	

=== Variety series ===
Year	Title	Network	Notes	Ref.
2009	Sanma's Karakuri TV	TBS		

=== Dubbing ===
Year	Title	Role	Voice dub for	Notes	Ref.
2017	Beauty and the Beast	Beast	Dan Stevens		
2020	Cats	Munkustrap	Robbie Fairchild		
