= Mata Hari (Wildhorn musical) =

Musical by Ivan Menchell, Jack Murphy, and Frank Wildhorn

마타하리 Mata Hari
- at the Moulin Rouge
- Music: Frank Wildhorn
- Lyrics: Jack Murphy
- Book: Ivan Menchell
- Premiere: March 29, 2016: Blue Square Interpark Hall, Seoul
- Productions: 2016 Seoul; 2017 Japan; 2017 Seoul; 2021 Japan; 2022 Seoul

Mata Hari at the Moulin Rouge is a musical with a book by Ivan Menchell, lyrics by Jack Murphy, and music by Frank Wildhorn. It is based on the life of Mata Hari, a dancer and spy during World War I.

It premiered on 29 March 2016 in South Korea at Bluesquare Interpark Hall with the production directed by Jeff Calhoun. The Japan premiere production ran from 21 to 28 January 2018 in Umeda Arts Theater in Osaka and 3 to 18 February in Tokyo International Forum Hall C in Tokyo. A subsequent production opened in Seoul, South Korea, in June 2017 directed by Stephen Rayne that featured major changes to the story and structure.

== Synopsis ==
The musical tells the story of Mata Hari, an exotic dancer who was executed in France following a conviction of espionage during World War I. The musical's official website describes the plot as:

"The year 1917.

Paris, once the glamorous city of light, is suffering amidst the chaos that is World War I. France, Great Britain and Russia (the allies) are fighting against Germany and the Austrian-Hungarian empire (the enemy). To heal the wounds of war, a beautiful dancer Mata Hari captivates all of Europe, her mysterious dance putting her at the centre of attention within high society.

Mata Hari's status as a celebrity allows her to travel between the warring countries making her a valuable asset to the French army and one day a visit from George Ladoux of the French military intelligence changes her life forever.

Meanwhile she begins a relationship with a young French pilot, Armand Gilot, but all is not as it seems...."

== Inception and development ==
In 2012, Frank Wildhorn suggested a musical about the life and death of Mata Hari to South Korean producer Hong Hyun Eum. Ivan Menchell, Wildhorn's writing partner, completed the first draft of the script in 2013.

The first reading of Mata Hari took place in New York at the Manhattan Pearl Studio. During this time, Wildhorn also helped to produce Ock Joo Hyun's Gold album that predominantly featured her singing his songs. One of the songs, "내 마음을 조심해 Be careful with my heart", was from the development stages of Mata Hari. It was remixed to be more upbeat and jazzy than how the song was written. Ock Joo Hyun was the inspiration for Mata Hari and Wildhorn wrote the part to match her voice.

"There is a recording and it's a video on YouTube that she made of a song from Monte Cristo called "Back When The World Was Mine" that many of the actress, best actresses, in New York listen to all the time and really are blown away by it... It's a magical, magical moment this particular video on YouTube. And every time I listened to it I always get inspired that this was a voice I really wanted to write for."
- Frank Wildhorn, Mata Hari press conference

As the production took shape, Oh Pil Young was brought in to create the set design. The show took on a meta perspective wherein it was set on a stage in the Moulin Rouge. Mata Hari, a dancer and entertainer, is introduced by the Emcee who purposefully addresses the audience as spectators in the Moulin Rouge.

In 2015, another workshop was held, this time in Seoul at the Namsan Creative Center. Sophie Kim, Lee Ji Hoon, Lim Hyun Soo and Kim Soo Yong participated in the workshop as the Korean lyrics and dialogue was tried out for the first time. Then on 25 January 2016, the cast and creatives performed a Music Showcase of the key numbers. Menchell and Wildhorn were both there to introduce, give context to and play the songs that they had been developing. This was the first that the press were able to see the music numbers. The whole showcase was broadcast on Naver Live TV and clips recorded by other musical news outlets such as PlayDB have been uploaded to YouTube.

== Productions ==
=== World premiere (2016) ===
The show officially opened on 29 March 2016 at Blue Square Interpark Hall in Seoul. Previews were held from 25 to 27 March, with a two-day break before the opening as the directors were still negotiating the cast schedule. EMK Musical Company reported that they had $4.5 million of pre-opening ticket sales and over 100,000 audience members attended the show in their limited eight-week run.

During 29 January to 3 February, the cast recorded a highlights album that featured six tracks. This was then released together as a package with a Photo Book and DVD of the behind the scenes.

=== 2017 Korean production ===
The productions premiere had received much criticism for the lack of substance in the show's plot but was critically acclaimed in its production design. As a result, the show was revised to be more "realistic" and showed more focus on the effect of war on both Mata Hari's relationships as well as the citizens of Paris.

A main draw in the first production was that it was performed on the stage of the Moulin Rouge where the audience member was treated as a patron of the cabaret. The opening of the show featured Mata being shot by a firing squad and is reenacted in the closing scene as well. The 2017 production, however, opens with the citizens of Paris panicking as an air raid goes off. It then transitions into Mata's dressing room and the show resumes almost the same plot for the rest of the act as the premiere.

There were changes to the characters but for the most part the three leads (Mata Hari, Armand and Ladoux) characterisations stayed the same. The role of Emcee was removed to get rid of the "show" and "performance" aspect of the premiere to better show the realism of the War. Katherine's role as a minor antagonist also decreased and her song was subsequently cut. Von Bissing had a larger part as his character was expanded upon to reveal more of the spy aspect to Mata's character.

=== 2022 Korean production ===
The 2nd production of Mata Hari premiered at Charlotte Theatre in Seoul on May 28, 2022. Ock Joo-hyun returned in the role of Mata Hari, alongside Mamamoo's Solar in her musical theatre debut. Armand was played by FT Island's Lee Hong-ki, BTOB's Lee Chang-sub, Phantom Singer's and Letteamor's Kim Seong-sik, and Yoon So-ho. Ladoux was played by RabidAnce's Kim Paul and Choi Min-cheol.

== Casts ==
Role	Seoul, South Korea (2016)	Japan (2017)	Seoul, South Korea (2017)	Japan (2021)	Seoul, South Korea (2022)	Japan (2025)
Mata Hari	Ok Joo Hyun; Sophie Kim	Reon Yuzuki	Ok Joo Hyun; Cha Ji Yeon	Reon Yuzuki; Reika Manaki	Ok Joo Hyun; Solar	Reon Yuzuki; Reika Manaki
Ladoux	Ryu Jung Han; Kim Joon Hyun; Shin Sung Rok	Kazuki Kato; Takanori Sato	Kim Joon Hyun; Min Young Ki; Moon Jong Won	Kazuki Kato; Mario Tashiro	Choi Min Cheol; Kim Paul	Kazuki Kato; Yusuke Hirose
Armand	Um Ki Joon; Song Chang Eui; Jung Taek Woon	Keisuke Higashi; Kazuki Kato	Um Ki Joon; Jung Taek Woon; Lim Seul Ong	Ryōsuke Miura; Keisuke Higashi	Kim Sung Sik; Lee Hong Ki; Lee Chang Sub; Yoon So Ho	Shouma Kai; Kazuki Kato
Emcee	Im Chun Gil					
Pierre		Taiki Nishikawa; Hiroki Hyakuna		Hiromu Kudō		Ryōki Nagae
Paul Painlevé		Hideo Kurihara		Naoto Kaji		Noboru Nakayama
Anna	Kim Hee Won; Choi Na Rae	Miō Kazune	Kim Hee Won; Choi Na Rae	Hitomi Harukaze	Han Ji Yeon; Choi Na Rae	Hitomi Harukaze
Katherine	Hong Ki Ju; Sun Woo			Megumi Iino		Ikuyo Aoyama
Von Bissing		Shōichi Fukui	Kim Neul Bom	Shuntarō Miyao		Yu Kamio

== Musical numbers ==
=== 2016 Korean production ===
Act I

- "서곡 (Overture)" - Orchestra
- "춤을 시작해 (Let the dance begin)" - Emcee, Ensemble
- "사원의 춤 (Temple dance)" - Orchestra
- "스파이가 되어 (Be a spy)" - Ladoux, Ensemble
- "돌아갈 수 없어 (I won’t go back)" - Mata Hari
- "저 높은 곳에서 (From way up there)" - Mata Hari, Armand
- "수천 명의 목숨 (Ten thousand)" - Ladoux
- "누구와 (I wonder who)" - Emcee, Ensemble
- "예전의 그 소녀 (The girl I used to be)" - Mata Hari
- "떨어질 때 (If you fall)" - Armand, Jack, Ensemble
- "수천 명의 목숨 리프라이즈 (Ten thousand reprise)" - Ladoux
- "마타 하리가 되다 (Becoming Mata Hari)" - Mata Hari
- "안되는데 (Didn’t mean to)" - Armand
- "스파이가 되어 리프라이즈 (Be a spy reprise)" - Emcee, Von Bissing, Ensemble
- "내 마음을 조심해 (Be careful with my heart)" - Mata Hari, Ensemble
- "남자 대 남자 (Man to man)" - Ladoux, Armand
- "어딘가 (Some place)" - Mata Hari, Armand

Act II

- "막간음악 (Entr'acte)" - Orchestra
- "마지막 춤을 (The last dance)" - Ladoux, MC, Katherine, Von Bissing, Ensemble
- "노래를 기억해 (The song remembers)" - Mata Hari
- "단 하루 (One more day)" - Armand
- "너 때문에 (Because of you) - Ladoux
- "너 때문에 리프라이즈 (Because of you reprise)" - Ladoux
- "내 길은 하나 (All I want)" - Mata Hari
- "선택권 (You have a choice)" - Katherine
- "나의 전부 (Everything to me)" - Mata Hari, Armand
- "이제 어디로 (What am I to do?)" - Mata Hari, Ladoux, Armand
- "너를 통해 (Through you)" - Anna
- "끝내야 할 임무 (All that we had to do)" - Ladoux, Ensemble
- "그래서 내가 스파이야 (That’s why I’m a spy)" - Mata Hari, MC, Ensemble
- "평밤한 일상 (Ordinary lives)" - Armand
- "마지막 춤을 리프라이즈 2 (Last dance reprise 2)" - MC, Ensemble
- "나팔소리가 잦아든 후에 (When the trumpets fade)" - Ladoux
- "너를 통해서 리프라이즈 (Through you reprise)" - Ladoux
- "마지막 순간 (One last time)" - Mata Hari
- "마타 하리의 고별 공연 (Mata’s farewell performance)" - Ensemble

=== 2017 Korean production ===
The 2017 Korean production has seen major revisions since its premiere. Majority of the main songs have remained the same however songs have been renamed, added and removed.

Source; Mata Hari Official Production Site (In Korean) (In English)

Act I

- "서곡 (Overture)" - Orchestra
- "살아 (Live)"
- "돌아갈 수 없어 (I won’t go back)" - Mata Hari
- "소문난 미녀 (Toast of the Town)"
- "싸워 (Fight)"
- "수천 명의 목숨 (Ten thousand)" - Ladoux
- "인생이란 (C'est la Vie)"
- "조금 더 큰 일 (This is something more)"
- "마타 하리가 되다 (Becoming Mata Hari)" - Mata Hari
- "스파이를 찾아 (To catch a Spy)"
- "수천 명의 목숨 리프라이즈 (Ten thousand reprise)" - Ladoux
- "내 삶이 흘러가 (A Life Time)" - Mata Hari
- "스파이를 찾아 리프라이즈 (To catch a spy reprise)"
- "남자 대 남자 (Man to man)" - Ladoux, Armand
- "안녕 (Good bye)"
- "떨어질 때 (If you fall)" - Amrand, Jack, Ensemble
- "두 사람 (Two People)" - Mata Hari

Act II

- "막간음악 (Entr'acte)" - Orchestra
- "칼날의 끝 (On the edge of a Knife)" - Ensemble
- "단 하루 (One more day)" - Ensemble
- "너 때문에 (Because of you)" - Ladoux
- "너 때문에 리프라이즈 (Because of you reprise)" - Ladoux
- "내 길은 하나 (All I want)" - Mata Hari
- "스파이를 찾아 리프라이즈 (To catch a spy reprise)"
- "내 길은 하나 / 태그 (All I want / Tag)"
- "또 한 명 (A soldier falls)"
- "이제 어디로 (What am I to do?)" - Mata Hari, Ladoux, Armand
- "평밤한 일상 (Ordinary lives)" - Armand
- "너를 통해 (Through you)" - Anna
- "끝내야 할 임무 (All that we had to do)" - Ladoux, Ensemble
- "사원의 춤 (Temple dance)" - Orchestra
- "남자 대 남자 리프라이즈 (Man to man reprise)"
- "인생이란 리프라이즈 (C'est la Vie reprise)"
- "나팔소리가 잦아든 후에 (When the trumpets fade)" - Ladoux
- "마지막 순간 (One last time)" - Mata Hari
