= Im Tae-kyung =

South Korean musician and singer

Im Tae-kyung 임태경
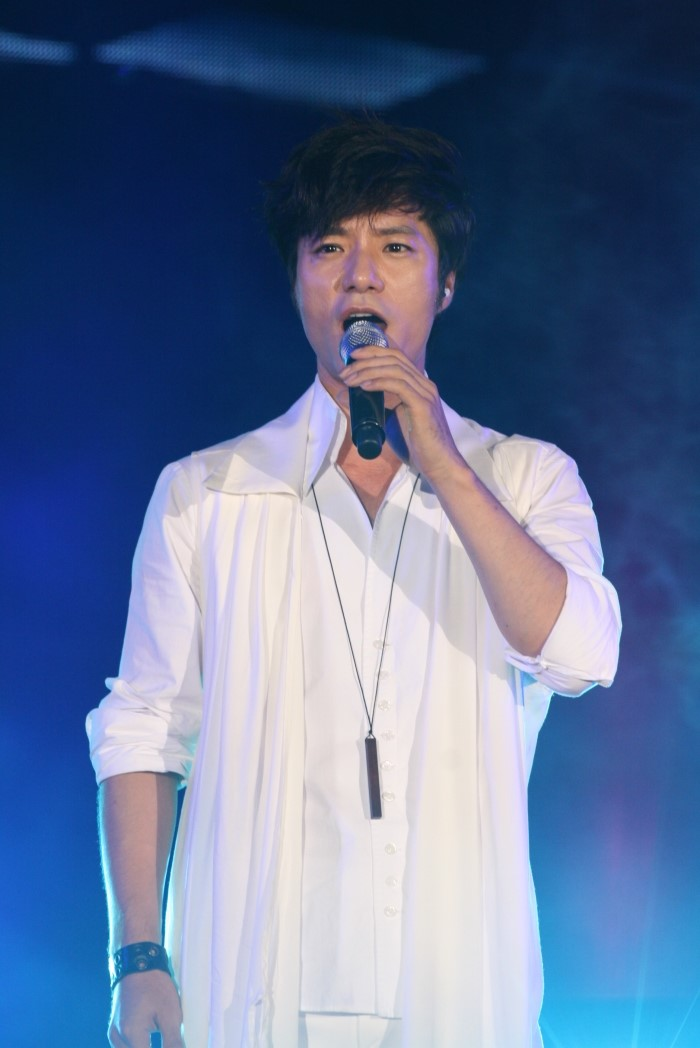
- Im in 2012

Background information
- Born: July 4, 1973 (age 53); Seoul, South Korea
- Genres: Crossover; musical
- Occupations: Actor; singer
- Years active: 2001–present
- Spouse: Park So-yeon (m. 2009; div. 2010)
- Website: imtk.co.kr

- Im Tae-kyung
- Hangul: 임태경
- Hanja: 任兌卿
- RR: Im Taegyeong
- MR: Im T'aegyŏng

Im Tae-Kyung (Korean: 임태경; born July 4, 1973), sometimes credited as Lim Tae-kyung, Im Tae-kyeong, or Lim Tae-kyeong, is a South Korean musical and television actor, and crossover tenor.

== Life and career ==
Im's mother is an amateur gugak singer, he grew up listening to various genres of music. Im studied music at Yewon School in Seoul and at Institute Le Rosey in Switzerland. He graduated from Worcester Polytechnic Institute in 1997, with a major in manufacturing engineering and a minor in music. After graduating, Im decided to pursue a career in music. He trained under renowned Metropolitan Opera tenor Richard Cassilly for a year until Cassilly's sudden death. Discouraged, Im returned to school to pursue a PhD in engineering. However, after careful consideration, Im decided to return to music. During his undergraduate studies, he battled with leukemia.

Im met actress Park So-yeon while they starred in the musical Roméo et Juliette. They began dating shortly thereafter and married in October 2009. The marriage lasted eight months, with the couple divorcing in mid-2010.

== Discography ==
=== Studio albums ===
- April 8, 2008, Sings The Classics?
- November 24, 2004, Sentimental Journey

=== Extended play ===
- 18 December 2015, 순수의 시대 (Sunsu-ui sidae)
- 5 March 2014, All This Time
- 13 August 2012, 2012 Masterpiece Vol.1

=== Single ===
- 20 August 2015, 그대의 계절 (Geudae-ui gyejeol)

=== Soundtrack appearances ===
- March 14, 2010, The King of Legend OST, "My Way"; KBS1
- October 30, 2007, Lobbyists OST, "Fate", SBS
- 2006, Jumong OST, "First Time", MBC
- 2005, Lawyers OST, "Destiny (옷깃) and Red Road", MBC

== Filmography ==
=== Television series ===
Year	Title	Korean Title	Network	Role	Notes	Ref.
2011	Radio Star	라디오스타	MBC	Himself	Guest (Episode 209)	
2018	Video Star	비디오스타	MBC Every 1	Himself	Guest (Episode 83)	
2018	Misty	미스티	JTBC	Ha Myung Woo (Prisoner)	Supporting role	
2019	Happy Together	해피투게더	KBS2	Himself	Guest (Season 4, Episode 49)	
2019	Woman of 9.9 Billion	99억의 여자	KBS2	Leon	Supporting role	

== Musicals ==
- Rudolf (as Rudolf), November 10, 2012 – January 27, 2013
- Mozart! (as Mozart)
  - 2012 10 July – 4 August M
  - May–July 2011
  - January–February 2010
- Sopyonje, August to November 2010
- Roméo et Juliette (as Romeo)
  - November–December 2009
  - July–August 2009
- Hamlet- World version (as Hamlet), August to October 2008
- Sweeney Todd (as Sweeney Todd), September–October 2007
- Jesus Christ Superstar (as Jesus Christ)
  - January–February 2007
  - December 2006
- Winter Sonata 겨울연가 (as Kang Jun-sang)
  - 2006 (Sapporo, Osaka, Tokyo)
- Sword of Fire 불의 검 (as Asa), September–October 2005
