= Sylvester Levay =

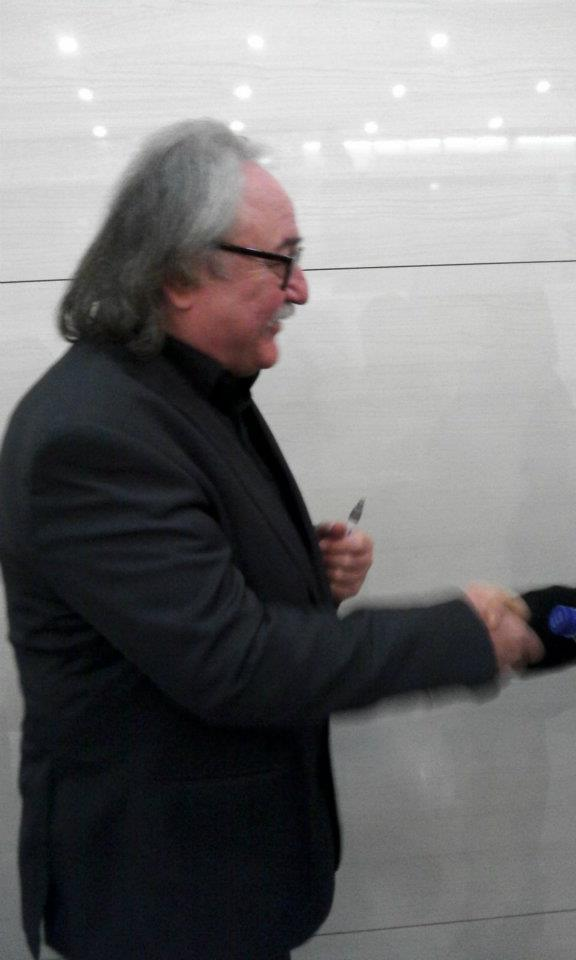
- Levay at 2012 Elisabeth Premiere

Background information
- Born: 16 May 1945 (age 80); Subotica, FS Serbia, DF Yugoslavia
- Genres: Film score
- Occupations: Composer, musician
- Instrument: Keyboards

Sylvester Levay (originally Lévay Szilveszter, Serbian: Силвестер Леваи, Silvester Levai) is a Hungarian recording artist and composer, born in Yugoslavia (now Serbia).

== Life and career ==
Levay was born on 16 May 1945 in Subotica in the North Bačka District of Vojvodina, Yugoslavia (now Serbia). Sylvester Levay began his musical studies at the age of eight. Levay developed a taste for American music while growing up in Yugoslavia, eventually becoming a music arranger and lyricist. Upon his arrival in Munich in 1972, he met his writing partner, Michael Kunze, with whom he has created many successful theatrical works. From 1980 to 2000 he lived in Hollywood and concentrated on composing film music. He composed songs for notable artists like Elton John and Penny McLean. He was awarded a Grammy for his 1975 song "Fly Robin Fly".

In October 2010, Levay worked with Xiah Junsu of JYJ to prepare for a musical concert - "Kim Junsu Musical Concert, Levay with Friends" in South Korea to be held at Seoul's Olympic Gymnastics Arena.

He currently divides his time between homes in Munich, Vienna and Los Angeles.

== Compositions (selection) ==
- "Fly, Robin, Fly" (1975)
- Get Up and Boogie (1976)
- Scarface OST (as arranger) (1983)
- Flashdance soundtrack collaboration with Giorgio Moroder
- Where the Boys Are '84 (1984)
- Invitation to Hell (1984)
- Creator (1985)
- My Man Adam (1986)
- Airwolf (1984–1986)
- Cobra (1986)
- Mannequin (1987)
- Werewolf (TV series) (1987–88)
- Probe (TV series) (1988)
- Navy SEALs (1990)
- Stone Cold (1991)
- Hot Shots! (1991)
- Medicopter 117 (1998–2006)
- Hexen, Hexen (musical) (1990)
- Elisabeth (Musical) (1992)
- Mozart! (musical) (1999)
- Rebecca (musical) (2006)
- Marie Antoinette (musical) (2006)
- Beethoven Secret (musical) (2023)

== Awards ==
- Grammy Award for Fly, Robin, Fly, words by Michael Kunze (1975)
- Goldene Stimmgabel (2002)
- Goldene Europa (2002)
