= Ben Sprecher =

Ben Sprecher is a Broadway producer and general manager. Sprecher's credits include, as producer, Voices in the Dark (1999), Tony Award-nominee Fortune's Fool (2002), Sly Fox (2004), Mark Twain Tonight! (2005), The Odd Couple (2005–06), Legends (2006–07) starring Joan Collins and Linda Evans, A Moon for the Misbegotten (2007) starring Kevin Spacey and Eve Best, and American Buffalo (2008) starring John Leguizamo and Cedric the Entertainer.

Sprecher is founder and chairman of The Sprecher Organization, and built the Promenade Theatre, the Variety Arts Theatre, and the Little Shubert Theatre. The Sprecher Organization produces and general manages plays and musicals, acts as General Manager and/or Executive Producer for other producers and provides integrated production and marketing services through on-site staff, subsidiaries or affiliated providers.

== Rebecca scandal ==
In 2012, Sprecher was a central figure in a scandal surrounding an attempt at mounting the musical Rebecca on Broadway. As the project's lead producer, Sprecher delayed the musical on September 8, 2012, two days before rehearsals were slated to begin, when he announced that a major investor had died. According to Sprecher, this investor had committed to $4.5 million, more than a third of the show's $12 million capitalization.

The "deceased investor" was later identified as "Paul Abrams", a South African businessman who had allegedly fallen ill and died after contracting malaria. Sprecher stated he had never met Abrams nor had a single conversation with him, despite Abrams's investment in the musical. Some members of the Broadway community raised suspicions, including Robert E. Wankel, president of The Shubert Organization and a six-figure investor in Rebecca as well as the owner of its intended theater, the Broadhurst.

On September 26, 2012, Sprecher announced to the cast that due to new financial commitments, rehearsals for the musical would commence on October 1. The day before these rehearsals were to start, Sprecher announced that he had failed to raise enough funds for the musical. He said that a new investor had been lined up and ready to commit, but had backed out after receiving an anonymous email advising him to distance himself from the project.

Mark Hotton of West Islip, New York was revealed as the middleman between Sprecher and Paul Abrams on October 3, 2012. A 2011 civil fraud lawsuit against Hotton had claimed he had a "long history of criminal misconduct and fraud". Sprecher's lawyer Ronald Russo later announced that "Paul Abrams" did not exist, and asserted that Sprecher had been tricked by Hotton into believing in the validity of Abrams' existence. The case is the subject of a criminal investigation by the FBI.

== Criminal allegations ==
On August 13, 2019 Sprecher was arrested in New York City on child pornography charges. According to court documents, Sprecher admitted he downloaded and shared child pornography.
