= Michael Kunze =

German musician, librettist, and author (born 1943)

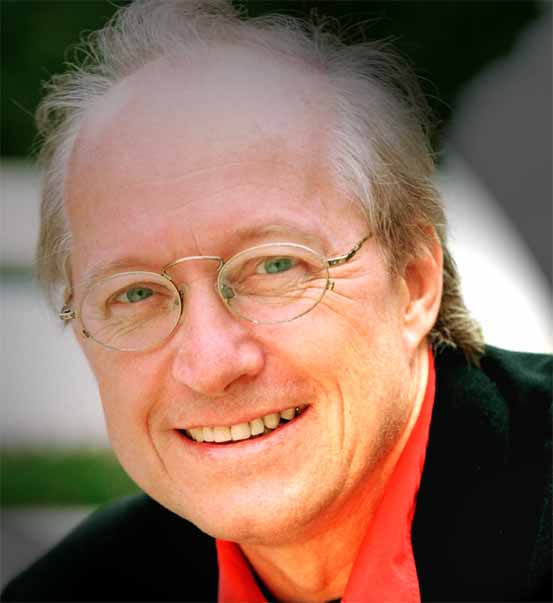
- Kunze in 2009

Background information
- Also known as: Stephan Prager
- Born: Michael Rolf Kunze; 9 November 1943 (age 82); Prague, Protectorate of Bohemia and Moravia
- Genres: Musical theatre, pop music, books
- Occupations: Librettist, songwriter, author
- Years active: 1965–present
- Website: http://michaelkunze.info/

Michael Rolf Kunze (born 9 November 1943, in Prague) is a foremost German musical theater lyricist and librettist.

He is best known for the hit musicals Elisabeth (1992), Tanz der Vampire (1996), Mozart! (1999), Marie Antoinette (2006), and Rebecca (2006).

He has also written the lyrics for a number of hit songs (under the pseudonym Stephan Prager), including the number one Billboard hit "Fly, Robin, Fly" (1976), and was one of the top 1970s record producers, producing songs for musical acts Silver Convention, Penny McLean, and Sister Sledge. Kunze has won a Grammy Award, ECHO Lifetime Award and holds 79 Gold and Platinum records.

== Early life ==
Born in Prague, Kunze is the son of actress Dita Roesler and Walter Kunze, a writer, cartoonist and journalist, who worked for the German language newspaper Prager Tagblatt. He grew up in Southern Germany and attended Klenze Oberrealschule in Munich. He studied law, philosophy and history at LMU Munich.

== Early career ==
Kunze started writing music and lyrics during his high school years in the early sixties. The Hamburg folklore group, City Preachers, recorded an LP with some of those early songs. The record was anything but a commercial success, but it made the music business aware of Michael Kunze. The first song Kunze produced with Peter Maffay, a 20-year-old newcomer, was called "Du" (English Translation: "You"). It topped the German charts in the summer of 1970 and went gold.

Working with Peter Maffay, Kunze co-wrote the song "Ich bin wie du" for Elke Best. Backed with "Die Spiele der großen Leute" the recording was produced by Fritz Muschler and released on EMI Electrola 006-30 462 in 1973.

His recordings would dominate the 1970s music charts in Germany, Austria and Switzerland. When he produced his first international act, he hit both the top of the Billboard and Cashbox charts in the U.S. with the song, "Fly, Robin, Fly".

His group, Silver Convention, represented by composer Sylvester Levay and Michael Kunze himself, influenced disco music and was the first German aggregation ever to win the coveted Grammy Award. Based on his success in the U.S. – after "Fly, Robin, Fly" came such hits as "Lady Bump" and "Get up and Boogie" – Michael produced albums with a vast and varied array of internationally known performers, including Julio Iglesias, Nana Mouskouri, Herbie Mann, Lulu, Gilbert Bécaud, Sister Sledge and Caterina Valente.

In 1981, Kunze stopped working as a producer but continued to write lyrics for top artists. Taking a temporary hiatus from show business, he wrote the book Highroad to the Stake: A Tale of Witchcraft (German Title: Strasse ins Feuer). It was translated into several languages; The New York Times called it "a vivid story of a witch." He wrote a second book, Give Way To Freedom (German Title: Der Freiheit eine Gasse) on the 1848 democratic revolution in Southern Germany.

== Later career ==
In the 1980s, the musical began making its way into the center of Kunze's activities. First, he adapted Andrew Lloyd Webber's musical Evita, which was the beginning of his collaboration and friendship with the legendary Broadway director, Harold Prince. The success of his adaptation opened the doors of the German-speaking market for the modern Anglo-American musical and made him the preferred translator for international hit shows. His German version of Cats ran for seven years in Vienna, making it one of the greatest hits of all times in that city. The numerous other musicals Kunze has translated into German include The Phantom of the Opera, A Chorus Line, Song and Dance, Into the Woods, Follies, Assassins, Side by Side by Sondheim, Dorian Gray, Little Shop of Horrors, Aspects of Love, Sunset Boulevard, Kiss of the Spider Woman, The Hunchback of Notre Dame, The Lion King, Mamma Mia! and Elton John's Aida.

Kunze also started working for television. He conceived and wrote several, 90-minute shows for the major German and Austrian networks (Liebe ist .../ZDF, Sport Gala/ARD, Weil wir leben wollen /ZDF) and developed the ARD Series Showgeschichten. In 1991, he conceived the international Peter Ustinov Gala in Paris, celebrating Sir Peter Ustinov's 70th birthday, starring Sir Yehudin Menuhin, Klaus Maria Brandauer, Petula Clark, Tony Curtis and Montserrat Caballé.

With the annual Bambi Award Gala, he created the German counterpart to the American Academy Award presentation. His once-a-year special, Die Peter-Alexander-Show, starring Germany's top musical entertainer, Peter Alexander, and, among others, Richard Chamberlain, Joan Collins and Liza Minnelli (ORF) reached cult status in the 1990s. He also conceived Der Goldene Löwe, the German counterpart to the American Emmy Awards show. Over the years, he has also written a number of articles for German magazines and newspapers (Stern, Frankfurter Allgemeine, ZEITMagazin, Playboy, Süddeutsche Zeitung), exploring his views on the function of entertainment in society and current media issues.

== Current career ==
Since the 1990s, Kunze is creating original musicals in his own style. In September 1992, his musical Elisabeth, about the life of the Empress Elisabeth of Austria, opened at Vienna's Theater an der Wien (music by Sylvester Levay). The show ran in Vienna for more than six years and was immediately regarded as the rebirth of the contemporary continental musical theater in Europe. It was soon exported to other countries, such as Japan, Hungary, Sweden, Holland and Germany.

Collaborating with Roman Polanski (director) and Jim Steinman (composer), Kunze wrote his first English libretto and lyrics for the musical, Dance of the Vampires. In October 1997, a German version opened at the Viennese Raimund Theater. On 3 March 2000, the show was transferred to Stuttgart, Germany. In December 2003, it opened in Hamburg, where it ran for another three years before opening in Berlin. The show also reached Broadway, where, despite Kunze's protests, an unauthorized version ran, for three months. It is currently running in Warsaw, Stuttgart, Vienna, Budapest and Tokyo.

Kunze's Mozart! (music: Sylvester Levay; director: Harry Kupfer), dramatizing the famous composer's life, premiered in October 1999 in Vienna (Theater an der Wien). It continues to play and run in Hamburg, Germany; Karlstad, Sweden; Tokyo, Japan; and Budapest, Hungary.

In 2006, two new Michael Kunze musicals opened. While Rebecca, based on Daphne du Maurier's famous novel, premiering on 28 September at Vienna's Raimund Theater, became another hit, Marie Antoinette disappointed. The latter show, dramatizing the events of the French Revolution, opened first in Tokyo and then in 2008, in Bremen, Germany. Both productions, though praised by critics, were financial failures.

In September 2009, Kunze gave the keynote speech at Second European Conference of the Musical Theater Educators Alliance International, "A Tale of Two Cities", in Hamburg, Germany.

His musicals are considered the foundation of a new genre in contemporary musical theater, called the Drama Musical. Its dramatic structure integrates elements of the film structure into the classic two-act drama form.

== Awards ==
- 56 gold records
- 23 platinum records
- Grammy Award for Fly, Robin, Fly, music by Sylvester Levay (1975)
- Paul-Lincke-Ring (1989)
- Goldene Feder des Deutschen Textdichter-Verbandes (1991)
- Heinz-Bolten-Baeckers-Preis of the GEMA-Stiftung (1993)
- Musical of the Year Award for Mozart! (musical) (2000)
- Musical of the Year Award for Elisabeth (2001)
- ECHO Lifetime Award (2005)
- Musical of the Year Award for Rebecca (musical) (2007)
- German Music Authors' Awards (2010)

== Major works ==
=== Adaptations ===
- 1980 – "I Love My Wife" German version (Theater Oberhausen)
- 1981 – "Evita" German version (Theater an der Wien)
- 1983 – "Cats" German version (Theater an der Wien)
- 1985 – "Le Cochon" (Le Cochon qui voulait maigrir) German version (Burgtheater Vienna)
- 1985 – "Song and Dance" German version (Deutsches Theater, Munich)
- 1986 – "A Chorus Line" German version (Raimundtheater)
- 1986 – "Little Shop of Horrors" German version (Szene Wien)
- 1987 – "Wodka-Cola" (Leave it to Me) German version (Staatstheater Stuttgart)
- 1988 – "The Phantom of the Opera" German version (Theater an der Wien)
- 1988 – "Avos!" German version (Stadttheater, Grosses Haus, Freiburg)
- 1989 – "Czechow" German version (Theaterfestival Konstanz)
- 1990 – "Into the Woods" German version (Stadttheater, Heilbronn)
- 1991 – "Follies" German version (Theater des Westens, Berlin)
- 1992 – "Dorian Gray" German version (Stadttheater, Heilbronn)
- 1993 – "Assassins" German version (Stadttheater, Heilbronn)
- 1993 – "Kiss of the Spider Woman" German version (Raimundtheater)
- 1995 – "City of Angels" German version (Stadttheater, Heilbronn)
- 1995 – "Sunset Boulevard" German version (Rhein-Main-Theater, Niedernhausen)
- 1996 – "Aspects of Love" German version (Staatsoperette, Dresden)
- 1999 – "The Hunchback of Notre Dame" German version (Musicaltheater Berlin)
- 2001 – "The Lion King" German version (Hafentheater Hamburg)
- 2002 – "Mamma Mia!" German version (Operettenhaus Hamburg)
- 2003 – "Wicked" German version (Palladiumtheater Stuttgart)

=== Original musicals ===
- 1991 – "Hexen Hexen" (Sylvester Levay) Deutschhof, Heilbronn, 15 June
- 1992 – Elisabeth (Levay) Theater an der Wien, 3 September
- 1997 – Tanz der Vampire (Jim Steinman) Raimund Theater, 4 October
- 1999 – Mozart! Das Musical (Levay) Theater an der Wien, 2 October
- 2006 – Marie Antoinette (Levay) Imperial Theatre, Tokyo, 7 January
- 2006 – Rebecca (Levay) Raimund Theater, Vienna, 3 September
- 2014 – Lady Bess (Levay) Imperial Theater, Tokyo, 13 April
- 2023 – Beethoven Secret (Levay) Seoul, January
