= Elisabeth (musical) =

Musical about Empress Elisabeth of Austria

- Music: Sylvester Levay
- Lyrics: Michael Kunze
- Book: Michael Kunze
- Basis: The life of Empress Elisabeth of Austria
- Productions: 1992 Vienna; International productions

Elisabeth is a Viennese musical commissioned by the Vereinigte Bühnen Wien and originally produced in German, with a book and lyrics by Michael Kunze and music by Sylvester Levay. It portrays the life and death of Empress Elisabeth of Austria, also known as "Sisi", the wife of Emperor Franz Joseph I, from her engagement and marriage in 1854 to her murder in 1898 at the hands of the Italian anarchist Luigi Lucheni; it focuses on her growing obsession with death, as her marriage and the empire crumble around her just before the turn of the 20th century.

According to Vereinigte Bühnen Wien, it has been translated into ten languages and seen by over 12 million spectators in 14 countries, making it the most successful German-language musical of all time.

== Synopsis ==
In the "world of the dead", Luigi Lucheni is being interrogated by a judge as to why he has murdered the Empress Elisabeth. Lucheni claims that he did no more than what Elisabeth herself wanted, since all her life Elisabeth has been in love with Death himself – and vice versa. As his witnesses, Lucheni brings back the dead aristocracy of the bygone era and takes us to the past, where he serves as a sarcastic narrator of the events that lead to the transformation of the sweet and innocent Sisi to the revered and infamous Elisabeth, Empress of Austria and Queen of Hungary, and her decline through later years until her assassination.

At a young age, Sisi, grown up in a seemingly sorrowless environment, experiences her first encounter with Death, which launches a love–hate affair that will span her entire life. Lucheni claims that once Franz Joseph, the Emperor of Austria, picks Elisabeth as his bride – for once opposing his domineering mother Sophie – he begins a chain of events that will eventually topple the Habsburg Empire. Elisabeth herself very soon comes to regret her seemingly "fairy-tale marriage". She feels abandoned by her careless husband, psychologically abused by her possessive mother-in-law, and is chronically depressed due to her loneliness. There is only one thing that keeps her emotionally stimulated—the dark and sensual shadow of Death; but Elisabeth is reluctant to consummate their relationship. When Death takes her infant daughter, the tragedy shakes the young Empress extremely, but she refuses to give in to Death's sway.

After her other two children, including her only son Rudolf, are taken away by Sophie, Elisabeth calluses over and becomes cold and selfish. She flees the Austrian court and spends decades restlessly travelling all over the world, trying in vain to escape from her fear of emptiness. Eventually, Elisabeth makes peace with her husband and finds new meaning in her life when she helps unify Austria and Hungary, but her newfound purpose makes her neglect her psychologically delicate son even further, sending young Rudolf into deep depression and causing him to bond with Death.

Eventually, Rudolf's own loneliness and his father's pressure cause him to snap and he embraces Death, committing suicide at Mayerling with his mistress, Mary Vetsera. This event completely breaks down Elisabeth and she begs Death to take her. However, her scorned lover now refuses to take her in.

Another decade goes by. Elisabeth still wanders from place to place, dressed in permanent mourning. Franz Joseph visits her from time to time, begging her to return home to Vienna, firmly believing that love is the answer to all sorrows, but Elisabeth refuses, saying that sometimes love is simply not enough to cure old wounds.

In a horrifying vision of the fall of the House of Habsburg, Franz Joseph at last meets his mysterious rival. He watches as Death tosses a dagger to Lucheni, but, crushed by the weight of his imperial crest, he is powerless to save his wife.

On 10 September 1898, while on her way to board a ship in Geneva, Empress Elisabeth of Austria is mortally wounded, stabbed right in the heart with a crudely sharpened file. As she lies dying, Death comes to claim her spirit with a kiss and an embrace.

== Principal characters ==
- Elisabeth, the Empress of Austria and later Queen of Hungary. Nickname is Sisi. Her birthplace is the Kingdom of Bavaria in Germany.
- Death, the personification of the abstract concept of "Death" or the "Grim Reaper". His appearance is modeled on the poet Heinrich Heine who was fascinated by Elisabeth, and the rock singer David Bowie.
- Luigi Lucheni, an Italian anarchist and Elisabeth's assassin. He serves as the narrator in the story, quick to point out Elisabeth's flaws and fallibility.
- Franz Joseph, the Emperor of Austria and later King of Hungary. Husband of Elisabeth.
- Archduchess Sophie, Franz Joseph's domineering mother.
- Rudolf, Elisabeth and Franz Joseph's son.
- Max, Prince of the Kingdom of Bavaria in Germany. Elisabeth's neglectful father that she nonetheless idolizes.
- Ludovika, Princess of the Kingdom of Bavaria in Germany. Elisabeth's social-climbing mother and Sophie's younger sister.
- Helene, Elisabeth's demure and ladylike elder sister.
- Countess Esterházy, the Mistress of the Household.
- Count Grünne, Franz Joseph's advisor.
- Cardinal Archbishop Rauscher, the head of the Roman Catholic Church in Austria.
- Prince Schwarzenberg, the State Minister.
- Frau Wolf, the mistress of a brothel in Vienna.

== Productions ==
The premiere of Elisabeth, directed by Harry Kupfer, took place on 3 September 1992 at the Theater an der Wien in Vienna, Austria, where it ran until January 1997. After a brief hiatus, it reopened on 4 September 1997 and closed on 25 April 1998. The production was revived in October 2003 and ran until December 2005, and again from 2012 to 2014.

An open-air concert production at Schönbrunn Palace in Vienna, Austria, played in June 2019, June 2022, June to July 2023, and June 2024. A production at Karreveld Castle in Brussels, Belgium, ran in August 2022.

== Song list ==
Additional songs have been added for some productions of Elisabeth that are not featured in all productions. Also the order of songs is often switched, which is the most noticeable between the German and the Viennese versions. This song list and order, with titles in English, is based upon the original Vienna production except where noted.

=== Act One ===
- Prologue (Prolog) – Judge, Lucheni, Death
- Like You (Wie du) – Elisabeth, Max
- Lovely to Have You All Here – (Schön, euch alle zu seh'n) Ludovika, Hélène, Family
- No Coming Without Going (Kein Kommen ohne Geh'n) – Death (often omitted)
- Black Prince (Schwarzer Prinz) – Elisabeth (originally a direct reprise of Like You)
- To Each He Gives His Own (Jedem gibt er das Seine) – Sophie, Franz-Joseph, the Court
- Things Never Happen As Planned (So wie man plant und denkt...) – Lucheni, Sophie, Hélène, Elisabeth, Franz-Joseph
- Nothing is Difficult Any More (Nichts ist schwer) – Franz-Joseph, Elisabeth
- All Questions Have Been Asked (Alle Fragen sind gestellt) – Wedding Chorus
- She Doesn't Fit (Sie passt nicht) – Sophie, Max, Wedding Guests
- The Last Dance (Der letzte Tanz) – Death
- An Empress Must Shine (Eine Kaiserin muss glänzen) – Sophie, Countess Esterházy, Ladies-in-Waiting
- I Belong to Me (Ich Gehör Nur Mir) – Elisabeth
- The First Four Years (Die Ersten Vier Jahre) – Lucheni, Elisabeth, Sophie, Ladies-in-Waiting, Franz-Joseph, The Court, Hungarians
- The Shadows Grow Longer (Die Schatten werden länger) (Preview) – Death
- The Cheerful Apocalypse (Die fröhliche Apokalypse) – Lucheni, a Student, a Journalist, a Poet, a Bohemian, a Professor, coffeehouse patrons
- Child or Not (Kind oder nicht) – Sophie, Countess Esterházy, Young Rudolf (introduced in the German premiere)
- Elisabeth, Open Up My Angel (Elisabeth, mach auf mein Engel) – Franz-Joseph, Elisabeth, Death
- Milk (Milch) – Lucheni, the Poor
- Beauty Care (Schönheitspflege) – Countess Esterházy, Ladies-in-Waiting
- I Just Want to Tell You (Ich will dir nur sagen) (I Belong to Me Reprise) – Franz-Joseph, Elisabeth, Death

=== Act Two ===
- Kitsch (Kitsch) – Lucheni
- Éljen (which is Hungarian for "long live...") (Éljen) – Hungarian Crowds, Lucheni (often omitted)
- When I Want to Dance (Wenn ich tanzen will) – Death, Elisabeth (introduced in the German premiere; often omitted)
- Mama, Where Are You? (Mama, wo bist du?) – Young Rudolf, Death
- Mama, Where Are You? (reprise) (Mama, wo bist du reprise) – Young Rudolf, Death (Original Dutch production only)
- She Is Insane (Sie ist verrückt) – Elisabeth, Frau Windisch
- Nothing, Nothing, Nothing at All (Nichts, nichts, gar nichts) – Elisabeth (originally a dance-sequence with Elisabeth as Titania from A Midsummer Night's Dream)
- Us or Her (Wir oder sie) – Sophie, The Court
- Don't Play the Prude (Nur kein Genieren) – Madame Wolf, Lucheni, Whores
- The Last Chance (Or 'The Malady') (Die letzte Chance (Maladie)) – Death, Elisabeth
- Argument between Mother and Son – Franz Josef & Sophie (Streit Mutter und Sohn)
- Bellaria (Bellaria) – Sophie (first appeared in Hungarian and Japanese productions in 1996; often omitted)
- The Restless Years (Die rastlosen Jahre) – Franz-Joseph, The Court, Ladies-in-Waiting, Lucheni
- Hunt (Jagd) – A sequence referencing Elisabeth's hunting trips in Europe in the original Viennese production (often omitted)
- The Shadows Grow Longer (Die Schatten werden länger (reprise)) – Death, Rudolf
- Argument Between Father and Son (Streit Vater & Sohn) – Rudolf, Franz Joseph (first seen in the Dutch and Essen productions)
- Hate (Hass) – Anti-Semites & Lucheni (often omitted)
- Conspiracy (Verschwörung) – Rudolf, Hungarian Nationalists, Death (sometimes omitted)
- Like You (Wie du (Reprise)) – Elisabeth, Max's Ghost
- If I Were Your Mirror (Wenn ich dein Spiegel wär) – Rudolf, Elisabeth
- The Mayerling Waltz (Mayerling-Walzer) – Rudolf, Death, Mary Vetsera
- Rudolf, Where Are You? (Dirge) (Rudolf, wo bist du? (Totenklage)) – Elisabeth
- My New Assortment (Mein neues Sortiment) (Kitsch (reprise)) – Lucheni
- Ships in the Night (Boote in der Nacht) – Elisabeth, Franz-Joseph
- On the Deck of the Sinking World (Am Deck der sinkenden Welt) – Lucheni, Death, Franz-Joseph, the Habsburgs
- The Veil Descends (Der Schleier fällt) – Elisabeth, Death
- Closing Music (Schlussapplaus) – Instrumental

== CD and DVD releases ==
As of November 2007, at least twenty-five cast and studio albums, demos, and promotional albums/singles, as well as eight commercial DVDs of the show, have been released to the public, including the following.

- Vienna, 1992 Elisabeth – original cast recording (Originalaufnahmen aus dem Musical Elisabeth): Elisabeth: Pia Douwes, Der Tod: Uwe Kröger, Luigi Lucheni: Ethan Freeman, produced by Jimmy Bowien on Polydor GMBH - 513 792-2
- Vienna, 1996 Elisabeth – live recording (Live aus dem Theater an der Wien Gesamtaufnahme des Musicals Elisabeth): Elisabeth: Maya Hakvoort, Der Tod: Addo Kruizinga, Luigi Lucheni: Bruno Grassini, on Polydor GMBH - 531 481-2
- Scheveningen, 1999 Elisabeth – original Dutch cast album: Elisabeth: Pia Douwes, De Dood: Stanley Burleson, Luigi Luicheni: Wim van den Driessche on Polydor - 543 335-2
- Essen, 2001 Elisabeth – original German cast album (Highlights der deutschen Urauffürung im Colosseum Theater Essen): Elisabeth: Pia Douwes, Der Tod: Uwe Kröger, Luigi Lucheni: Carsten Lepper on Polydor GMBH – 549 800-2
- Vienna, 2004 Elisabeth – Revival cast recording (Aktuelles Cast Album, Wien): Elisabeth: Maya Hakvoort, Der Tod: Máté Kamarás, Luigi Luicheni: Serkan Kaya on HitSquad Records 6680530
- Vienna, 2005 Elisabeth – live recording (Gesamtaufnahme live aus dem Theater an der Wien): Elisabeth: Maya Hakvoort, Der Tod: Máté Kamarás, Luigi Luicheni: Serkan Kaya, Erzherzog Rudolf: Fritz Schmid on HitSquad Records 668262
- Japan, 2016 Elisabeth – live recording of 2016 tour (both casts): Elisabeth: Mari Hanafusa; Der Tod: Yu Shirota / Yoshio Inoue; Luigi Lucheni: Ikusaburo Yamazaki / Songha; Erzherzogin Sophie: Mayo Suzukaze / Tatsuki Kohju; Erzherzog Rudolf: Yuta Furukawa
- Japan 2023 Elisabeth – live recording of 2022–23 tour (both casts): Elisabeth: Reika Manaki; Der Tod: Ikusaburo Yamazaki / Yuta Furukawa; Luigi Lucheni: Ryuji Kamiyama / Mario Kuroba; Erzherzogin Sophie: Miyuki Tsurugi / Mayo Suzukaze; Erzherzog Rudolf: Shouma Kai / Toshiki Tateishi.

== Notes ==
- ^a The Vienna Revival also went on to tour Japan in 2007. It opened in Osaka at the Umeda Arts Theatre on March 28, 2007, and showed 40 performances through April 30, 2007. On May 7, 2007, the production opened (in concert version) at the Koma Stadium Theatre in Tokyo. The Japan Tour of the Vienna Revival run ended on May 20, 2007.
- ^b For two consecutive summers, these special, week-long invitational concerts were held by the historic Miramare Castle to promote the Vienna Revival. These performances were held during the show's annual summer pause, and several cast members from the Vienna Revival participated. The concerts were performed in German and Italian.
- ^c Elisabeth premiered in the Hungarian language at The Open-Air Theatre of Szeged in August 1996. The Budapest production that premiered at The Operetta Theatre in October 1996, took over the repertoire for the previous Open-Air production. Between the years of 1996 and 2005, with allowance for casting changes and the use of the theatre's space for other various events, subsequent productions were held (including the Miskolc run). The Hungarian production has a running history of eight years, the longest running, un-interrupted Elisabeth production in the world.
