= Mozart! =

Musical about Wolfgang Amadeus Mozart

- Music: Sylvester Levay
- Lyrics: Michael Kunze
- Book: Michael Kunze
- Basis: The life of Wolfgang Amadeus Mozart
- Productions: 1999 Austria; 2002 Japan; 2003 Hungary; 2015 Vienna revival

Mozart! is an Austrian musical, originally written in German. The original book and lyrics were written by Michael Kunze and the music and arrangements were composed by Sylvester Levay. The show reinterprets the life of the famous composer Wolfgang Amadeus Mozart. It presents him as a complex figure shaped by both extraordinary genius and personal struggle.

The original production was directed by the opera director Harry Kupfer. It premiered on October 2, 1999, in the Theater an der Wien, and the final performance was on 7 May 2001. It ran for 419 performances, showing to approximately 420,000 patrons.

== Synopsis ==
=== Act I ===
On a dark autumn night in 1809, Constanze Nissen, Mozart's widow, leads Dr. Anton Mesmer and his servant through St. Marx Cemetery in Vienna. She has promised to show him Mozart's grave in exchange for payment. The atmosphere of the place overwhelms Mesmer, and his thoughts drift back forty years to a child prodigy he once witnessed performing in his own garden.

The memory unfolds in 1768 Vienna, where the Salzburg court musician Leopold Mozart presents his young son Wolfgang Amadé Mozart to aristocratic society on stage, assisted by Wolfgang's sister Maria Anna Mozart, herself a former prodigy. Though the boy is ill, his skill amazes the guests. Then this small boy in a powdered wig, named Amadé, becomes a special character. No character in the story can see him and only the audience can. He is Mozart's genius made flesh. He never stops writing music and follows Wolfgang for the rest of his life.

Nine years later. Wolfgang is in his twenties and miserable in Salzburg. His arrogance at a court dinner irritates Archbishop Colloredo. Colloredo tears up his score and Wolfgang quits on the spot. He packs up and leaves with only his mother, over Leopold's protests. Count Arco, the archbishop's steward, quietly tells Nannerl what Leopold already suspects: Colloredo will block Wolfgang at every court in Europe.

In Mannheim, Wolfgang meets the impoverished Weber family. The mother steers her daughter Aloysia Weber toward him and Wolfgang is infatuated with her. He hands them money and promises to launch her career. He keeps sending them funds from Paris until he and his mother have almost nothing left. She falls ill and dies in a cold room. Wolfgang goes home to Salzburg alone.

Leopold greets him with a ledger of debts. Then Colloredo travels to Vienna and takes Wolfgang along, promising a meeting with the emperor. In Vienna, Wolfgang stumbles across the Webers again. Aloysia has married someone else. He falls instead for her younger sister Constanze and moves into the family's apartment. In Salzburg, Leopold carries Wolfgang's childhood keepsakes down to the Salzach River and throws them in. Nannerl watches and says nothing. She has quietly understood that her own life will stay small while her brother follows his genius wherever it leads.

Colloredo never arranges the imperial audience. He orders Wolfgang back to Salzburg instead. Wolfgang refuses. Count Arco ends the argument by throwing the composer out of the Archbishop's quarters.

Wolfgang stands in the street with no job and no patron. For a moment, it feels like freedom. Then Amadé appears beside him, still writing, still demanding. Wolfgang begins to understand that no employer has ever asked as much of him as his own gift does. The real struggle is just beginning.

=== Act II ===
Back at St. Marx Cemetery in 1809, Dr. Mesmer's servant begins to dig at the gravesite. Mesmer tries to ask Constanze about Mozart's strange habits and the years of their marriage. She says nothing. The story moves back to Vienna in 1781.

Constanze has left home after a fight with her mother and gone to Wolfgang. Her mother tracks her down and accuses Wolfgang of seducing her daughter. Her mother and her new partner see a chance to get money out of him. They force Wolfgang to sign a contract that binds him to either marry Constanze or pay for her upkeep for life. Constanze is furious at her mother's scheming. She grabs the contract and tears it up in front of Wolfgang.

Wolfgang is doing well in Vienna. He has money, status and a growing reputation. But he cannot enjoy any of it without his father's approval. After years apart, Leopold finally comes to visit. Wolfgang gives his father the mysterious little box from childhood, now filled with money, enough for Leopold to quit his job under Colloredo for good. Leopold takes it as an insult. He throws the box back at Wolfgang's feet and walks out. Wolfgang chases after him but cannot catch up. They never see each other again. Back in Salzburg, Colloredo asks Leopold whether he has passed on an offer to bring Wolfgang back to court. Leopold tells him to forget it and promises to find a new child prodigy instead. Colloredo dismisses him.

Without his father, Wolfgang loses his footing. The Weber family bleeds him dry. Constanze's mother demands that he write begging letters to friends and patrons. He refuses. The argument is cut short by news from Salzburg. Leopold has died. Still in shock, Wolfgang goes to St. Stephen's Cathedral to say goodbye. His words sound more like an accusation than a farewell. On his way out, a masked stranger approaches him and hands him a commission to write a Requiem.

In 1789, news of the French Revolution reaches Vienna and stirs up the crowd. Wolfgang speaks out. Emanuel Schikaneder pulls him aside and warns him that artists have better tools than angry speeches. He hands Wolfgang the libretto for The Magic Flute. Amadé grabs it and starts composing on the spot. The premiere is a huge success. People pour out of the theatre and buy portraits of Mozart. The applause feels like the beginning of a legend. But Wolfgang is already ill. He lies in bed, pale and feverish. Amadé sits beside him and works on the Requiem. When the ink runs dry, Amadé pricks Wolfgang's arm and writes with his blood. Wolfgang begs him to stop. Amadé does not stop. He drives the quill into Wolfgang's heart. Mozart dies.

Time collapses. Strangers strip the body for souvenirs. The people from Wolfgang's life gather around the bed one last time. Out at St. Marx Cemetery, Nannerl finds the mysterious little box. She opens it. A small melody plays. It is the same tune from when they were children.

== Musical Numbers ==
=== Act I ===
1. Prolog – Ensemble
2. Was für ein Kind! – Leopold, Anna Maria, Ensemble
3. Menschen vergessen – Ensemble - Added for the Hamburg 2001 production; retained in all subsequent versions.
4. Die Wunder sind vorüber – Wolfgang, Leopold, Ensemble - Replaced "Der Rote Rock" from Hamburg 2001 onwards. "Der Rote Rock" was retained only in the 1999 world premiere and the 2008 Tecklenburg production.
5. Ich bin, ich bin Musik – Wolfgang - Originally titled "Warum kannst du mich nicht lieben wie ich bin?" in the premiere.
6. Wo bleibt Mozart? – Leopold, Colloredo, Graf Arco, Ensemble
7. Niemand liebt dich so wie ich – Leopold, Wolfgang
8. Ah, das Fräulein Mozart! – Nannerl, Ensemble - Shortened and revised for the 2015 revival; title unchanged.
9. Eine ehrliche Familie – Cäcilia Weber, Aloysia, Josepha, Sophie - Running order adjusted for the 2015 revival.
10. Schließ dein Herz in Eisen ein – Leopold - Running order adjusted for the 2015 revival.
11. Die Reise nach Paris – Wolfgang, Anna Maria
12. Niemand applaudiert – Wolfgang, Aloysia - Added for the 2015 Vienna revival.
13. Was für ein grausames Leben – Wolfgang
14. In Salzburg ist Winter – Ensemble - Replaced "Hol-la-re, du-hi-je" from Hamburg 2001 onwards. The original was retained only in the 1999 premiere and the 2008 Tecklenburg production.
15. Ein bissel für's Hirn und ein bissel für's Herz – Schikaneder, Ensemble - Omitted from the Hamburg 2001 production.
16. Gold von den Sternen – Baronin von Waldstätten
17. Niemand liebt dich so wie ich (Reprise) – Leopold, Nannerl, Wolfgang
18. Wien wird mich um ihn beneiden (Antecessio "Wie kann es möglich sein?") – Colloredo, Graf Arco - Originally titled “Mir ist er anvertraut”; renamed for the 2015 revival.
19. Wo gibt's was zu gaffen? – Wolfgang, Ensemble - Originally titled “Halten Sie den Atem an!” in the 1999 premiere; retitled “Wo gibt's was zu gucken?” for Hamburg 2001, and again renamed for the 2015 revival.
20. Ich bin extraordinär – Wolfgang, Ensemble - Originally titled “Sauschwanz von Drecken” in the 1999 premiere; text revised for Hamburg 2001 and formally renamed for the 2015 revival.
21. Weil du so bist, wie du bist – Wolfgang, Constanze
22. Wir zwei zusammen – Wolfgang, Constanze - Added for the 2015 Vienna revival; not present in any earlier production.
23. Ich bleibe in Wien! – Wolfgang, Ensemble
24. Wie wird man seinen Schatten los? – Wolfgang, Amadé (Act I Finale)

=== Act II ===
1. Entr'acte - In both the 1999 premiere and the Hamburg 2001 production, a second prologue was inserted at this point; subsequently cut.
2. Hier in Wien! – Ensemble
3. Du hast ihn an der Angel – Cäcilia Weber, Ensemble - Added for the 2015 Vienna revival.
4. Dich kennen heißt dich lieben” – Wolfgang, Constanze
5. Ha! Ein Liebesnest! – Cäcilia Weber, Johann Thorwart
6. Dich kennen heißt dich lieben (Reprise) – Wolfgang, Constanze
7. Wer ist wer? (Mummenschanz / Rätsellied / Mummenschanz Reprise) – Wolfgang, Ensemble - Originally three separate sections; the “Rätsellied” was shortened and all three collapsed under this single title for the 2015 revival.
8. Freunde – Wolfgang, Ensemble - Derives from the original montage "Jetzt sind wir beim Spielen / Der Prinz ist fort"; split into separate scenes from Hamburg 2001 onwards and retitled "Freunde" for the 2015 revival.
9. Der Prinz ist fort – Nannerl - Originally part of the Act I montage in the 1999 production; made independent in Hamburg 2001 and relocated to Act II for the 2015 revival.
10. Irgendwo wird immer getanzt – Constanze
11. Wie kann es möglich sein? – Colloredo
12. Warum kannst du mich nicht lieben? – Wolfgang, Leopold
13. Mozart, Mozart! – Wolfgang, Ensemble
14. Ich bin, ich bin Musik (Reprise) – Wolfgang, Amadé
15. Finale – Full Company

Music lists and changes have referred to the 1999 premiere cast recording (Theater an der Wien, Vienna) and the 2015 Austrian revival cast recording.

== Productions ==
The production appealed especially to younger Viennese audiences. Following its world premiere in Vienna, the musical toured internationally and was staged in multiple countries. It has been adapted into various languages (Czech, Dutch/Flemish, German, Hungarian, Japanese, Korean, Lithuanian, Swedish) and has been seen by over 3.2 million people worldwide. Productions have taken place in:

- Austria: Theater an der Wien (1999 – 2001), World Premiere
- Germany: Neue Flora (Stage Entertainment), Hamburg (September 21, 2001 – June 30, 2002)
- Japan: Tokyo and Osaka (2002)
- Hungary: Budapest (2003)
- Sweden: Karlstad (2005)
- Japan: Osaka, Tokyo, Nagoya, Fukuoka (2005)
- Japan: Tokyo (2007)
- Germany: Zwickau, Plauen (2008)
- Czech Republic: Brno (2009)
- South Korea: Seoul (2010, 2011, 2012, 2014, 2016, 2020, 2023)
  Gwangju: (2010, 2014)
  Busan: (2010, 2014)
  Changwon: (2010, 2014)
  Daegu: (2010, 2014)
- Japan: Tokyo, Osaka, Kanazawa (2010-2011)
- Japan: Tokyo (2014)
- Austria: Vienna (2015)
- China: Shanghai (2016, 27 November 2025 – 14 December 2025)
  Beijing (2019, 25 December 2025 – 28 December 2025)
  Guangzhou (17 December 2025 – 21 December 2025)
  Suzhou (1 January 2026 – 3 January 2026)
- Belgium: Antwerp (2017)
- Japan: Tokyo (2018)
- Japan: Tokyo (2021)
- Hungary: Veszprém (2022)
- Japan: Tokyo (2024)

== Recordings ==
The Vienna and Budapest productions released cast albums, as well as the Japanese and Korean productions. In addition to that, the Korean production released two DVDs with a different cast on each. A DVD and a cast album have been released based on the 2015 Vienna production. Japanese productions have released DVDs in 2014 and 2021.

== CD recordings ==
- 1999: Premiere cast recording in Austria
- 2002: CD of the Japanese production cast
- 2003: CD of the Hungarian production cast
- 2010: CD of the South Korean production cast
- 2015: Austrian revival cast recording
- 2020: CD of the South Korean production cast

=== Chart positions ===
Chart (1999–2000)	Peak position
Austrian Albums (Ö3 Austria)	10
