= Filippo Strocchi =

Italian actor

Filippo Strocchi (born 5 February 1982) is an Italian actor, singer, and musician.

== Biography ==
Filippo Strocchi was born in Modena on 5 February 1982. He was a solo singer in several bands and learned to play the guitar, drums and the piano. He was at the Bernstein School of Musical Theater under the direction of Shawna Farrell in 2003. After that, he got a scholarship for the Guildford School of Acting.

In 2006, Strocchi was on stage for two seasons as "Danny Zuko", in the National Italian Tour of Grease with the Compagnia della Rancia, directed by Federico Bellone.

In 2008, he played in Poor but beautiful at the Teatro Sistina, Rome, directed by Massimo Ranieri. His debut in Germany was in 2009, at the Palladium Theater in Stuttgart at the German production of Wicked (Stage Entertainment), as u/s Fiyero.

In 2010, Strocchi went on tour across Italy with Hairspray (Planet Musical), playing the role of Link Larkin, directed by Massimo Romeo Piparo. 2010/11 he played Nick Hurley, the male lead, in the Stage Entertainment production of Flashdance, on tour throughout Italy.

In autumn 2011, he was Anthony, the young sailor in the Sondheim Musical Sweeney Todd, directed by Marco Simeoli, at the Teatro Sala Uno, Rome. In 2012, Strocchi was on tour throughout Italy as Mercutio in Romeo & Juliet, directed by Claudio Insegno. In the same year he played the role of DJ Monty in Saturday Night Fever at the Teatro Nazionale in Milan, directed by Carline Brouwer.

In 2013, he went back to play the male lead, Danny Zuko again in Grease, for the Italian National Tour, directed by Saverio Marconi.

One year later Filippo Strocchi played one of the main characters (Rum Tum Tugger) in the original British production of Cats produced by David Ian, on tour all across Europe and throughout the UK.

In 2015, he went back to Italy to play Che, the male lead, in Evita, a production of Teatro Comunale di Bologna, directed by Gianni Marras. In December he gave his debut as Master of Ceremonies in The Hole (Letsgo Production), directed by David Ottone at the Linear Ciak Theatre in Milan.

In summer 2016, he was in Bologna at the Teatro Comunale di Bologna to play the role of Frederick Barrett in Titanic. In the season 2016/17 Strocchi came back as "Che" in Evita, in a touring production all around Italy, side by side with the Italian popstar Malika Ayane.

In summer 2017, he played the lead "Tony Manero" in Saturday Night Fever in Walenstadt, Switzerland, at the Walensee-Bühne (TSW Musical AG). Right after that he was part of the cast of "Tanz Der Vampire" in Vienna, Ronacher (VBW) playing Nightmare Solo and u/s "Krolock".

In January 2018, Strocchi played "Barrett" in Titanic in Ingolstadt with the Městské divadlo Brno. From 28 March until 2 April, Strocchi was Pilate in Jesus Christ Superstar (in concert) at the Ronacher in Vienna with a 43-musician-orchestra and Drew Sarich as Jesus.

In May 2018, Filippo Strocchi, Drew Sarich, Sasha Di Capri and Vini Gomes started a musical collaboration with a concert series, to present also their own songs. In summer 2018 he played the role of Stacee Jaxx (Tom Cruise in the movie) in Rock of Ages in Amstetten (AVB) directed by Alex Balga.

After his premiere in early autumn at the Musicaldome in Cologne, Strocchi became the lead part as Count of Krolock in the German Production of Tanz Der Vampire at the Theater des Westens in Berlin for 7 weeks.

In January 2019, Strocchi again took over the lead role in Saturday Night Fever, Tony Manero, in Ingolstadt with the Městské divadlo Brno. In April he played Pilate at the Viennese production of Jesus Christ Superstar.

== Theatre engagements ==
- Grease (Milan & Rome, Italy) - Danny Zuko (2007-2008)
- Wicked (Stuttgart, Germany) - u/s Fiyero (2009)
- Hairspray (Tour Italy) - Link Larkin (2010)
- Flashdance (Tour, Italy) - Nick Hurley (2011)
- Sweeney Todd (Rome, Italy) - Anthony (2011)
- Romeo & Juliet (Tour Italy) - Mercutio (2011-2012)
- Saturday Night Fever (Milan, Italy) - DJ Monty (2012)
- Grease (Tour Italy) - Danny Zuko (2013)
- Cats (London, England) - Rum Tum Tugger (2013-2014)
- The Hole (Milan, Italy) - The Emcee (2015-2016)
- Evita (Rome, Italy) - Che (2016-2017)
- Saturday Night Fever (Walenstadt, Switzerland) - Tony Manero (2017)
- Titanic (Ingolstadt, Germany) - Barrett (2018)
- Tanz der Vampire (Vienna, Austria) - u/s Graf von Krolock (2017-2018)
- Jesus Christ Superstar (Vienna, Austria) - Pilate (2018)
- Rock of Ages (Amstetten, Austria) - Stacee Jaxx (2018)
- Tanz der Vampire (Berlin, Germany) - Graf von Krolock (2018)
- Saturday Night Fever (Ingolstadt, Germany) - Tony (2019)
- Jesus Christ Superstar (Vienna, Austria) - Pilate (2019)
- The Rocky Horror Show (Amstetten, Austria) - Riff Raff (2019)
- Tanz der Vampire (Oberhausen) - Graf von Krolock

== Awards ==
- 2007 "Sandro Massimini National Award" as "Best Italian Musical Actor".
