= Ivan Ozhogin =

Russian opera singer

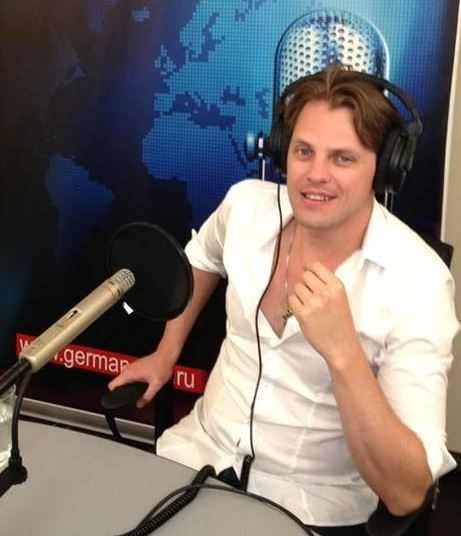
- Ivan Ozhogin at the interview

Background information
- Born: Ivan Gennadievich Ozhogin; September 1, 1978 (age 48); Ulyanovsk, RSFSR, USSR (now Russia)
- Genres: Musical, opera
- Occupations: Actor, musical actor, singer
- Instruments: Vocals (tenor), piano, guitar
- Years active: 1981–present

Ivan Gennadievich Ozhogin (Russian Иван Геннадьевич Ожогин, born September 1, 1978, in Ulyanovsk), is a Russian actor and singer best known for his work in musical theater. In 2013 he received The Golden Mask, Russia's highest theater award, for the role of Count von Krolock in the Russian production of the musical Dance of the Vampires.

== Career ==
Starting at the age of three Ivan Ozhogin learned to sing and play various musical instruments at public music and theater schools in Ulyanovsk, Russia.

Next to his career in musicals he also performed classical repertoire as an opera singer with the Moscow Helikon Opera. In 2007 he became a lead singer of the choir at the Nikolo-Ugreshsky Monastery in Dzerzhinsky near Moscow. He also toured Russia and Europe with the Bolshoi Don Cossacks Choir. Ivan regularly sings Russian folk and love songs at classical music events and works with Russia's leading orchestras. He is one of the initiators and founders of the open-air events of classical music named The Ecology of the Sound (Экология звука) that take place in the Kaluga region.

In 2011 Ivan Ozhogin managed a breakthrough as a musical actor when he starred as Count von Krolock in the Russian production of the musical Dance of the Vampires. The Russian premiere of the musical took place on September 3, 2011, at the Saint Petersburg Theater of Musical Comedy.

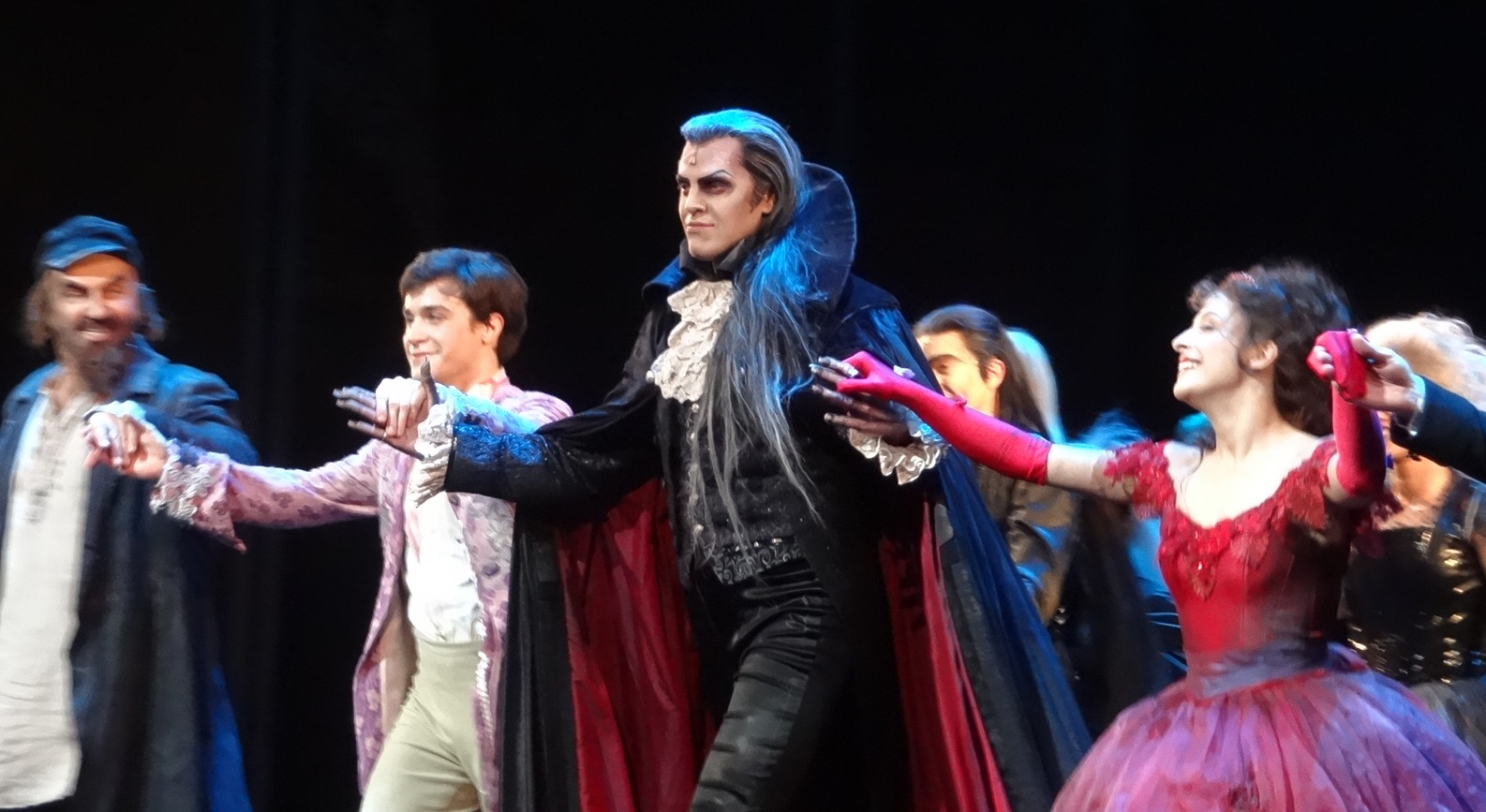
Tanz der Vampire, Theater des Westens in Berlin

In early 2013 Ivan Ozhogin cast for the role of Count von Krolock in the Berlin production of Dance of the Vampires and subsequently replaced Thomas Borchert. On February 8, 2013, Ivan performed for the first time in the German-speaking version of the musical on stage of the Theatre of the West in Berlin and became the first Russian actor to get cast in the original German production. He stated in an interview that he is not aware of any other musical actors that would perform the same role in two different languages and in two different countries at the same time.

Ivan Ozhogin was cast as the title role in the Russian production of The Phantom of the Opera, which began performances at Moscow's MDM Theater on October 4, 2014. Since January 2015 Ozhogin made appearances as Dr. Jekyll and Mr. Hyde in the new musical production at the Saint Petersburg Theater of Musical Comedy. Since September 2014, Ivan Ozhogin performs the role of Woland in Master & Margarita, a musical based on the controversial novel by Mikhail Bulgakov. It has been reported that the musical will be staged on Broadway featuring the stars of the Russian cast – Ivan Ozhogin and Vera Sveshnikova.

It has been reported that Ivan Ozhogin will take over the role of Count von Krolock in the Saint Petersburg and Moscow productions of Dance of the Vampires in 2016.

Since 2021 Ivan Ozhogin began to play the role of Jervis Pendleton in the Russian production of the musical Dear Mr. Smith (Daddy Long Legs).

== Stage Engagements ==
- 2001–2002: The Engagement in Monastery (Moscow) as Harlequin
- 2002–2003: Chicago (Moscow) as Mary Sunshine
- 2003–2004: Wedding of the Jay Birds (Moscow) als Zakhariya and Nightingale
- 2004: Nord-Ost (Moscow) as Romashov
- 2005–2006: Cats (Moscow) as Munkustrap
- 2006–2008: The Black Bridle of a White Mare (Moscow) as Agiz-in-parovoz
- since 2007: Lead singer in the choir at the Nikolo-Ugreshsky Monastery
- since 2008: Rasputin (Moscow) as Duke Yusupov
- 2009–2010: Beauty and the Beast (Moscow) as Monsieur D'Arque
- 2009–2011: Singer with the Bolshoi Don Cossacks Choir (Austria)
- 2010–2011: Member of the Russian Broadway Stars Show (Moscow)
- since 2010: Member of the Bravissimo Group (Moscow)
- since 2011: Dance of the Vampires (St. Petersburg) as Count von Krolock
- since 2012: Nutcracker as "Mouse King" (musical consultant and singer in the children's ice theater led by Elena Berezhnaya in St. Petersburg)
- 2013: Dance of the Vampires (Berlin) as Count von Krolock
- since 2014: Master & Margarita (St. Petersburg) as Woland
- since 2014: The Phantom of the Opera (Moscow) as The Phantom
- since 2015: Jekyll & Hyde (musical) (St. Petersburg) as Dr. Jekyll & Mr. Hyde
- since 2016: Dance of the Vampires (St. Petersburg/ Moscow) as Count von Krolock
- since 2021: Daddy Long Legs (St. Petersburg) as Jervis Pendleton

== Film and television ==
During his student years Ivan Ozhogin played minor parts in several Russian documentaries such as Criminal Russia, Reports of Detective Dubrovsky and in Denis Evstigneev's movie Mother. Since 2007 he appeared in the Russian film "Proof of Love" and in the TV-series "Adventures of Notary Neglintsev" and "Liteiny, 4."

== Other projects ==
In October 2013 he took part in the St. Petersburg's production of "Opera on Ice" show and performed together with renowned musicians and singers Edvin Marton, Caroline Sandgren, Vasily Gerello as well as figure skaters Evgeni Plushenko, Naomi Lang and Peter Tchernyshev.

== Awards ==
- 2012: Saint Petersburg Theater Prize The Golden Soffit as the best musical actor for the role of Count von Krolock in the Russian production of the Dance of the Vampires.
- 2013: Russian Theater Prize The Golden Mask as the best musical actor for the role of Count von Krolock in the Russian production of the Dance of the Vampires.
