= Jesper Tydén =

Swedish stage actor and singer (born 1975)

- Born: Jesper Tydén; August 9, 1975 (age 51); Stockholm, Sweden
- Website: Website

Jesper Tydén (born August 9, 1975) is a teacher and a stage actor/singer from Stockholm, Sweden.

== Biography ==
Jesper Tydén, born in Stockholm/Sweden, started his Vocal and Musical education at the Royal Music Conservatory in Stockholm. Throughout his studies he was a member of the Eric Ericsson Chamber Choir and the Swedish Radio Choir. His acting experience and bachelor in musicaltheatre he got from “Artisten” the Theatre and Opera school in Gothenburg. After graduating, Jesper was hired to play leading roles by numerous major musical theatres and productions throughout Europe including Disney's worldpremiere of “The Hunchback of Notre Dame” 2000 in Berlin/Germany, “Elisabeth” 2001/02 in Essen/Germany, “Miss Saigon” 2003/04 in St.Gallen/Switzerland, “Elisabeth” 2003/04 in Vienna/Austria, “West Side Story” 2003/04 in Bregenz/Austria, “Dracula” (European Premiere) 2005 in St.Gallen/Switzerland & Graz, “Robin Hood” (World Premiere) 2005 in Bremen/Germany, “Les Misérables” 2007 in St. Gallen/Switzerland & Graz/Austria and “Tutanchamun” (World Premiere) 2008 in Gutenstein/Austria. In 2009 he played “Les Misérables” in Klagenfurt/Austria and “La Belle Bizarre du Moulin Rouge” a European Tour. In 2009/10 he played the part of Toby in "Sweeney Todd", Radames “AIDA”, Padre “MANN VON LA MANCHA” D’Artagnan“3 Musketeers”. He has recorded 7 Cast CD's & 3 Pop singles and is an appreciated soloist in numerous concerts and galas.

== Stage Work ==
- Der Glöckner von Notre Dame (Berlin) - Phoebus (1999)
- Elisabeth (Essen) - Rudolf/understudy der Tod (2001/2001)
- Miss Saigon - (St. Gallen) Chris (2003/2004)
- West Side Story - (Bregenz) Tony (2003/2004)
- Elisabeth (Vienna) - Rudolf (2003–2004)
- Jesus Christ Superstar - (Essen, Berlin) Jesus (2004)
- Dracula, the Musical (St. Gallen) - Jonathan Harker (2005)
- Robin Hood (Bremen, München) - Robin Hood (2005/2006)
- Les Misérables - (St. Gallen) Marius (2006–2007)
- Dracula, the Musical (Graz) - Jonathan Harker (2007)
- Les Misérables - (Graz) Marius (2007–2008)
- Tutanchamun - Das Musical - Tutanchamun (2008)
- La belle bizarre du Moulin Rouge (Touring Germany, Austria and Switzerland) - Armand (2008–2009)
- Les Misérables - (Klagenfurt) Marius (2009)
- Sweeney Todd (Klagenfurt) - Toby (2009)
- Tutanchamun - Das Musical - (Cairo) Tutanchamun (2010)
- Aida - Radames - Schloss Festspiele Ettlingen/Germany ( July/August 2012)
- Der mann von La Mancha - Padre - Theater am Gärtnerplatz München/Germany ( Oct/Dec 2013)
- West Side Story - Tony - Graz/Austria ( Jun/July 2014)
- Drei Musketiere - D'Artagnan - Tourproduction/Germany (Oct/Dec 2014)
- Från Broadway till Duvemåla - Solist - Tourproduction/Sweden (2016-2017)
- Vincent van Gogh - Theo - Musical Frühling Gmunden/Austria (Aug/sept 2021)
- December songs - Solist Musical Frühling Gmunden/Austria (Dec 2022)
- Woman in white - Walter Hartwright - Musical Frühling Gmunden/Austria (April 2022)

== Discography ==
=== Cast Recordings ===
- Tutanchamun - Das Musical - Tutanchamun (2008)
- The Count of Monte Cristo (English Demo) - Albert (2008)
- Robin Hood (Bremen) - Robin Hood (2005/2006)
- Dracula, the Musical (Graz) - Jonathan Harker (2007)
- La belle bizarre du Moulin Rouge (Touring) - Armand (2008–2009)
- Tutanchamun - Das Musical - Tutanchamun (2010) (October/November 2010)

=== Studio albums ===
- Quilted - 2023
- How Could I (Single)
- Let It Ride (Single)
- The Drunken Sailors (with Henrik Westerberg)

=== Miscellaneous ===
- Musical Stars Volume 2 (Vocalist)
