= Ann Mandrella =

French actress

- Born: August 3, 1971 (age 53); Besançon, France
- Occupation: Actress
- Spouse: Drew Sarich
- Website: www.amandrella.com

Ann Mandrella is a French actress, born in Besançon, France on the 3rd of August. She has performed in theatre productions throughout Europe and in New York City.

== Biography ==
Ann's family moved to the town of Koblenz in Germany when Ann was a young child. From the beginning, Ann showed an interest in the performing arts. Her family encouraged her talent and she was enrolled in dancing and singing classes outside of school (the school she attended did not offer an arts program) and she participated in the local children's community theatre productions. After completing her secondary school education, Ann attended the Folkwang Hochschule in Essen, Germany for three years. There, she obtained a degree in musical theatre performance. After she graduated, she moved to Vienna, Austria to pursue further studies in the performing arts at the Gesangsstudio Theater. During her time in school, Ann supported herself through modeling work and by doing ballet/dance for local television shows.

Just before she completed her studies in Gesangsstudio, Ann was cast as Cha Cha in Grease (Vienna production), and she performed on the original cast album for the show. After her successful run in Grease, other roles would follow, including Babette in Beauty and the Beast, Anita in West Side Story, Roxie in Chicago, and Queenie in The Wild Party. She performed in several cities and countries throughout Europe, including Vienna (Austria), Amstetten (Austria), Stuttgart (Germany), Berlin (Germany), and Bern (Switzerland). Though she traveled often in order to perform, Ann's primary city of residence remained Vienna, where she maintains an apartment to this day.

During her time working in Europe, Ann met and married Drew Sarich, an American musical theatre actor and musician. In late 2005, Drew's career brought him to San Francisco. Ann, who was working on Show Boat in Switzerland, joined her husband in New York in February 2006. In September of that year, Ann made her American stage debut in the critically acclaimed Off-Broadway revival of Jacques Brel is Alive and Well and Living in Paris, which also starred her husband. In 2007, she made her Broadway debut as Babette in the Broadway production of Beauty and the Beast and was the final actress to play the role.^{1} Ann later moved back to Austria, where she currently resides with her husband and children. In 2009, she played the title role in the Andrew Lloyd Webber musical Evita in the Dortmund Theater in Germany, as well as Gitta in the European premiere of the Gershwin musical Pardon My English at the Staatsoperette Dresden.

== Stage Work ==
- Grease - Cha-Cha (1994–1995)
- Die Schöne und Das Biest (Vienna) - Babette (1995–1997)
- Cole Porter Revue - Juliet (1996–1997)
- West Side Story - Anita (1997)
- City of Angels (Krefeld) - Gabby/Bobby (1997)
- Die Schöne und Das Biest (Stuttgart) - Babette (1997–1998)
- City of Angels (Amstetten) - Gabby/Bobby (1998)
- Chicago (Vienna) - June (u/s Roxie) (1998–1999)
- Chicago (Berlin) - Roxie (2000)
- Chicago (Switzerland) - Roxie (2000–2001)
- Time Out! - Maxine (2001)
- Chicago (Düsseldorf) - Roxie (2001–2002)
- What A Feeling - Aylin (2002)
- Wake Up - Lydia (2002–2004)
- Lapdog and Wildcat (2003)
- The Wild Party (Amstetten) - Queenie (2003)
- The Wild Party (Klagenfurt) - Queenie (2004–2005)
- Show Boat - Ellie (2005–2006)
- Jacques Brel is Alive and Well and Living in Paris - u/s Woman #1 (2006)
- Beauty and the Beast (Broadway) - Babette (2007)
- Evita (Dortmund) - Eva Perón (2009)
- Pardon My English (Dresden) - Gitta (2009)
- Ich war noch niemals in New York (Vienna) - Lisa Wartberg (2010)
- Hello, Dolly! (Lehar festival, Bad-Ischl) - Dolly Levi (2013)
- Cabaret (musical) (Baden bei Wien) - Sally Bowles (2023)

== Discography ==
=== Cast Recordings ===
- What A Feeling (Original Bonn Cast)
- Wake Up (Original Wien Cast)
- Die Schöne und Das Biest (Original Stuttgart Cast)
- Chicago (Original Wien Cast)
- Die Schöne und Das Biest (Original Wien Cast)
- Grease (Original Wien Cast)

=== Miscellaneous ===
- Musical Christmas In Vienna (2003 Concert Cast)
