= Dracula, the Musical =

2001 American musical by Frank Wildhorn

Dracula
- The Musical
- Album cover of the original concept album
- Music: Frank Wildhorn
- Lyrics: Don Black; Christopher Hampton
- Book: Don Black; Christopher Hampton
- Basis: Dracula by Bram Stoker
- Productions: 2001 La Jolla Playhouse; 2004 Broadway; 2005 Theater St. Gallen; 2006 Mercer; 2007 Graz; 2009 Klagenfurt; 2010 Montreal; 2010 Novi Sad; 2011 Palatine; 2011 Tokyo & Osaka; 2012 Westcliff-on-Sea; 2013 Midland; 2013 Barga; 2013 Pforzheim; 2013 Flensburg; 2014 Kristianstad; 2014 Seoul; 2014 Shanghai; 2016 Seoul; 2016 Leipzig; 2017 Hamilton; 2020 Seoul; 2021 Seoul; 2021 Ulm; 2022 Vienna; 2022 Munich; 2023 Seoul; 2024 Seoul; 2025 Bulgaria; 2025 Los Angeles; 2026 Germany and Austria Tour; 2026 Seoul; 2026 Los Angeles; 2027 Poznań

Dracula, the Musical is a musical based on the original 1897 Victorian novel by Bram Stoker. The score is by Frank Wildhorn, with lyrics and book by Don Black and Christopher Hampton.

The show had its regional premiere at the La Jolla Playhouse, La Jolla, California, in 2001, playing to 115% capacity, earning the highest paid capacity for any world premiere production in the playhouse's history. It then premiered on Broadway in 2004, starring Tom Hewitt as the vampire Count and Melissa Errico as the woman he loves, Mina Harker.

A brief nude scene in which Dracula seduces Lucy Westenra (played by Kelli O'Hara) received much publicity, as did the show's numerous special effects. Despite that, the show ran for only 154 performances, and received mainly negative reviews. The show underwent substantial revision and later had engagements in Europe and Asia, where it achieved considerable success.

== Plot ==
=== Act I ===
Jonathan Harker, a young English solicitor, travels to Transylvania to finalize a real estate transaction with the reclusive and elderly Count Dracula, who intends to purchase property in London ("Prologue"). Upon his arrival, Harker is welcomed with an elaborate supper. During their conversation, Dracula speaks wistfully of his desire to abandon his isolation and begin a new existence in a foreign land (“Solitary Man”).

Dracula escorts Harker to his chamber, where he notices a portrait of Harker's fiancée, Mina Murray, provoking a powerful reaction. After Dracula departs, Harker and Mina, from different locations, reflect on the circumstances of their first meeting (“Whitby Bay”). In England, Mina suddenly hears Dracula's voice in her mind. He ominously announces his imminent journey and expresses his longing to be with her.

Early one morning, Dracula startles Harker while shaving, causing him to cut himself. Drawn to the sight of blood, Dracula approaches but recoils when he notices the crucifix around Harker's neck. Harker attempts to redirect the Count's attention to their legal business, but Dracula dismisses the matter and warns him to sleep only in his assigned chamber. As Harker's stay continues, the castle becomes increasingly nightmarish, and he desperately searches for an escape (“Jonathan’s Bedroom”).

While wandering the castle, Harker encounters Dracula's Brides, who attempt to seduce him. He willingly removes his crucifix, and the women prepare to drink his blood (“Forever Young”). Dracula intervenes, rebuking them for disobeying his command to leave Harker to him alone. When the Brides protest, Dracula appeases them by giving them an infant to consume. Dracula then feeds on Harker to restore his own youth (“Fresh Blood”). Fully rejuvenated, Dracula ascends into the air, while Harker narrowly escapes and eventually reaches Budapest.

Telepathically, Dracula contacts his devoted servant Renfield, who is confined to Dr. Jack Seward's psychiatric asylum. Promising him eternal life, Dracula secures Renfield's loyalty. Renfield envisions the Count's arrival in Whitby Bay aboard the ship Demeter and witnesses Dracula's slaughter of the vessel's captain and crew (“The Master’s Song”).

After learning of the maritime disaster, Mina discusses the news with her friend Lucy Westenra, who also confides her struggles with sleepwalking—an affliction inherited from her late father. Their conversation turns to Lucy's predicament of having received three marriage proposals in a single day. That evening, all three suitors attend tea: Quincey Morris, a bold American adventurer; Dr. Jack Seward, the intelligent asylum director; and Arthur Holmwood, Lucy's well-mannered childhood companion. Lucy ultimately accepts Holmwood's proposal (“How Do You Choose?”).

Later that night, Mina discovers Dracula feeding upon a sleepwalking Lucy. Speaking directly into Mina's mind, Dracula reveals that Mina was his true desire, but Lucy had answered his call instead. Mina begs him to spare her friend. Dracula agrees, but only if Mina will come away with him, an offer she resolutely refuses. Furious and shaken by Mina's resistance, Dracula vanishes. Lucy awakens and recounts the encounter to Mina (“The Mist”). Mina then explains that she has received word from Harker in Budapest and must leave immediately to marry him. Lucy congratulates her, thrilled that they will both soon be brides. Observing from a distance, Dracula recommits himself to the pursuit of Mina (“The Mist – Reprise”).

Distressed by Mina's preparations to depart, Dracula is compelled to follow her to the train station, where he confesses his longing from afar. Torn between her loyalty to Harker and a growing affinity towards the Count, Mina contemplates her unspoken pull towards darkness. She ultimately travels to Budapest and marries Harker (“A Perfect Life / Loving You Keeps Me Alive / Whitby Bay – Reprise”). Simultaneously, Lucy weds Holmwood in London (“The Weddings”). Believing Mina has slipped beyond his grasp, a furious Dracula appears at Lucy's wedding reception, causing her to collapse.

Concerned for Lucy's failing health, Dr. Seward summons Abraham Van Helsing, a renowned expert on obscure diseases. Van Helsing safeguards Lucy's room with garlic and provides her with holy water to protect her during sleep. However, enthralled by Dracula's influence, Lucy discards the protections and invites the vampire into her chamber (“The Invitation”). Dracula drains her blood while feeding her his own in return.

The following morning, Lucy attacks Holmwood, her teeth transformed into fangs. Van Helsing intervenes, saving Holmwood and driving Lucy into a frenzy with sacred prayers. Lucy soon dies, leaving Holmwood devastated and bewildered. Van Helsing consoles him while revealing the culprit is a vampire (“Nosferatu”).

Lucy is buried but rises again as a vampire. Dracula returns to her and proclaims her the first of his new “dynasty.” He sends her out to claim her initial victims before taking flight into the night sky in the form of a colossal bat (“Life After Life”).

=== Act II ===
Two weeks later, Van Helsing leads Holmwood, Morris, Dr. Seward, Harker, and Mina to Lucy's tomb. In the intervening days, a disturbing epidemic has arisen: small children are being abducted in the dead of night and returned drained of blood. Van Helsing seeks to convince the still-skeptical Holmwood, Morris, and Dr. Seward that the culprit is the undead Lucy Westenra. Upon entering the tomb, they discover Lucy's coffin is empty. She soon appears, carrying a child she intends to feed upon, and is confronted by the group. Through religious incantations, they force her back into her coffin. With great anguish, Holmwood drives a stake through Lucy's heart, while Van Helsing decapitates her, finally releasing her soul. ("Undead One, Surrender").

Reflecting on the horrors of the previous day, Mina once again hears Dracula's voice within her mind. When the Count asks why she makes him wait, Mina accuses him of murdering Lucy. Dracula counters that Lucy was not killed but granted eternal life—and that it was the vampire hunters who truly destroyed her. Despite herself, Mina feels a powerful and unsettling attraction to him. Torn between fear of his immense power and a growing emotional pull, she begs him not to force her love unless it is genuine (“Please Don’t Make Me Love You”).

Van Helsing uncovers the extent of Renfield's psychic bond with Dracula and visits his cell alongside Mina. Renfield explains his devotion to the Count and his belief that he has been promised eternal life. When Van Helsing questions whether they have met before, Renfield chillingly claims knowledge of Van Helsing's wife and her fate. Deeply shaken, Van Helsing abruptly leaves. Mina attempts to reason with Renfield, asking whether eternal life is worth the damnation of his soul. Renfield warns her of Dracula's intentions but soon realizes he has sealed his own doom. After he is left alone, Dracula appears and kills his former servant (“The Master’s Song (Reprise)”).

Van Helsing then reflects privately on his past, recalling his youth and his wife, Roseanne. Her death at the hands of a vampire—implied to have been Dracula—drove him to dedicate his life to hunting the undead in her memory (“Roseanne”).

Meanwhile, Holmwood, Morris, and Dr. Seward discover Dracula's London refuge in the house Harker sold to him while imprisoned in Transylvania. Van Helsing departs with the men, leaving Mina alone with Harker. As Harker sees them out, Mina becomes increasingly consumed by a desire to save Dracula from destruction. Unable to resist her longing any longer, she invites him into the house (“If I Could Fly”). Dracula places Harker into a trance and seduces Mina. Their moment of passion culminates when Dracula cuts open his chest and allows Mina to drink his blood, intending to transform her into a vampire (“Mina's Seduction”). The hunters return and confront Dracula, forcing him to flee (“It’s Over”).

Through hypnosis, Van Helsing uses Mina's growing telepathic bond to uncover Dracula's whereabouts. She reveals that he is retreating to Transylvania after the destruction of his London sanctuary. Fearing her own damnation, Mina extracts a solemn promise from each of the men—including Harker—that they will kill her if her soul cannot be saved (“Jonathan’s Promise”). The group prepares for the journey and the final confrontation (“Deep in the Darkest Night”). Left alone, Harker agonizes over the terrible vow he has made but resolves to honor it (“Before the Summer Ends”).

Aboard a train, Van Helsing once again hypnotizes Mina, who reveals that Dracula is concealed within a coffin in the hull of a ship. The trance deepens as Dracula's presence overwhelms her mind, forcing Van Helsing to break the connection. Mina withdraws to rest while the others plot their next move (“The Train Sequence / Life After Life (Reprise)”).

Returned to his castle, Dracula broods over the solitude and emotional desolation that accompany his immortal existence. Touched by her purity, he comes to the realization that he has fallen profoundly in love with Mina (“The Longer I Live”).

The hunters arrive at Dracula's castle, where the final confrontation unfolds. Morris is killed when he attempts to stake Dracula in his coffin. Van Helsing leaves Mina protected within a sacred circle of holy water while he joins Holmwood, Harker, and Dr. Seward in battling Dracula's Brides. Dracula soon appears before Mina, who chooses to follow the creature she loves into darkness (“At Last”). However, upon hearing the death cries of his Brides, Dracula realizes that Mina would share their fate if she becomes a vampire. Unable to condemn her to such an existence, he relinquishes his own desire.

Knowing that only his death can save her, Dracula asks Mina to release him from his cursed immortality using a Bowie knife taken from Morris. Weeping, Mina fulfills her lover's final wish just as the hunters return. Harker finds his wife cradling Dracula's body as it disintegrates into dust. (“Finale: There’s Always a Tomorrow”).

== Productions ==
- The musical had its world premiere developmental engagement at La Jolla Playhouse from October 9 to November 25, 2001, starring Tom Hewitt in the title role. The musical, after several revisions and additional workshops, premiered on Broadway at the Belasco Theatre on August 19, 2004, and closed on January 2, 2005, after 157 performances and 22 previews. Directed by Des McAnuff, the choreography was by Mindy Cooper, the scenic design by Heidi Ettinger, costume design by Catherine Zuber, lighting by Howell Binkley orchestrations by Doug Besterman and special effects by Flying by Foy. The musical starred Tom Hewitt, along with Melissa Errico as Mina. Darren Ritchie joined as Jonathan Harker, with Stephen McKinley Henderson as Van Helsing, and Chris Hoch as Arthur Holmwood. The show featured Don Stephenson as Renfield, and Kelli O'Hara as Lucy. Chuck Wagner was the standby for the roles of Dracula and Van Helsing. Elizabeth Loyacano was promoted to standby for Errico, after the role proved to be more demanding than it had been previously expected. She performed the role from September 7 through October 13. The original Catherine Zuber designed wardrobe is on display at the Costume World Broadway Collection at the Wick Theatre & Costume Museum in Boca Raton, Florida.
- After the show closed on January 2, 2005, the musical made its international debut at Theater St. Gallen, Switzerland, from April 23, 2005, to June 6, 2006. This was in a much-revised form, with many changes that Wildhorn had reportedly wanted for Broadway. This version included 6 new songs, performed by a 40-piece orchestra and a European cast, led by Thomas Borchert and Drew Sarich alternating the role of Dracula.
- The UK premiere of the musical took place in March 2010 at The Lowther Pavilion, Lytham St Annes, Lancashire. Produced by AV Productions the cast included Andy Vitolo as Dracula, Mairi Claire Connor as Mina, Mike Cosgrove as Van Helsing, Jeremy Clark as Jonathan Harker, Lucy Fellows as Lucy Westenra, Derek Winward as Arthur/Renfield and Phil Gwilliam as Dr Jack Seward, subsequent performances took place at The Lancaster Grand Theatre in September the same year.
- The Japanese premiere took place in August 2011 in Tokyo. Dracula was played by female performer Yoka Wao, the first woman to play the role of the Count on stage. Prior to that Wao has been a star in all-female Japanese musical theatre troupe the Takarazuka Revue. The cast also included Mari Hanafusa as Mina, Soma Suzuki as Van Helsing, Natsumi Abe as Lucy, Ryosei Konishi as Jonathan. The production was recorded and released both on CD and DVD.
- The Scandinavian premiere took place February 22, 2014 in Kristianstad, Sweden, produced by Emil Sigfridsson and directed by David Rix, with Choreography by Anna Renud and Musical direction by Jonas Svensson. Johan Wikström starred in the title role of Dracula.
- The South Korean production premiered in 2014 at the Seoul Arts Center. The production was staged from July 15 to September 5, 2014. Several notable performers comprised the principal cast: Kim Junsu and Ryu Jung-han alternated the title role of Dracula, Jo Jeong-eun and Jeong Sun-ah portrayed Mina, Yang Jun-mo played Van Helsing, Kim Ji-woo and Lee Ji-hye alternated the role of Lucy, and Jo Kang-hyun took on the role of Jonathan Harker. .

== Songs (Broadway) ==
Act I

- Prologue - Harker
- A Quiet Life - Dracula
- Over Whitby Bay - Harker & Mina
- Jonathan's Bedroom - Harker
- Forever Young - Dracula's Brides
- Fresh Blood - Dracula, Brides & Harker
- The Master's Song - Renfield & Dr. Seward
- How Do You Choose? - Lucy, Mina, Arthur, Dr. Seward & Quincey
- The Mist - Lucy
- The Mist (Reprise) - Dracula
- Modern World - Lucy, Mina, Arthur, Dr. Seward & Quincey
- A Perfect Life - Mina
- The Weddings - Mina, Harker, Arthur & Lucy
- Nosferatu - Van Helsing
- Prayer for the Dead - Van Helsing, Mina, Harker, Dr. Seward, Arthur, Quincey & Chorus
- Life After Life - Dracula & Lucy

Act II

- Undead one, Surrender - Van Helsing, Mina, Harker, Dr. Seward, Arthur, Quincey
- The Heart is Slow to Learn - Mina
- The Master's Song (Reprise)- Renfield & Dracula
- If I Could Fly - Mina
- Mina's Seduction - Mina & Dracula
- There's Always a Tomorrow - Dracula & Mina
- Deep in the Darkest Night - Van Helsing, Arthur, Quincey & Dr. Seward
- Before the Summer Ends - Harker
- All is Dark/Life After Life (reprise)- Mina & Dracula
- The Longer I Live - Dracula
- Finale: There's Always a Tomorrow - Mina & Dracula

== Songs (Austria) ==
Act I

- Prologue - Vamp Brides
- A Solitary Man - Dracula
- Whitby Bay - Mina & Harker
- Jonathan's Bedroom - Harker
- Forever Young - Vamp Brides
- Fresh Blood - Dracula, Vamp Brides & Harker
- The Master's Song - Renfield & Dr. Seward
- How Do You Choose? - Lucy, Mina, Arthur, Dr. Seward & Quincey
- The Mist - Lucy
- The Mist - (Reprise) - Dracula
- A Perfect Life/Loving You Keeps Me Alive/Whitby Bay (Reprise) - Mina, Harker & Dracula
- The Weddings - Mina, Harker, Arthur & Lucy
- The Invitation * - Lucy
- Nosferatu * - Van Helsing
- Prayer for the Dead - Van Helsing, Arthur, Dr. Seward, Quincey, Mina & Chorus
- Life After Life - Dracula & Lucy

Act II

- Undead One, Surrender - Van Helsing, Mina, Arthur, Dr. Seward, Quincey & Harker
- Please Don't Make Me Love You * - Mina
- The Master's Song (Reprise) - Renfield & Dracula
- Roseanne * (written specially for Uwe Kröger) - Van Helsing
- If I Could Fly - Mina
- The Seduction (There's Always a Tomorrow)- Dracula & Mina
- It's Over * (written specially for Uwe Kröger and Thomas Borchert) - Dracula & Van Helsing
- Jonathan's Promise * - Harker
- Deep in the Darkest Night - Van Helsing, Quincey, Arthur, Dr. Seward, Mina & Harker
- Before the Summer Ends - Harker
- The Train Sequence (Life After Life-Reprise) - Dracula, Mina & Van Helsing
- The Longer I Live - Dracula
- Finale: There's Always a Tomorrow - Dracula & Mina

(* new songs added to the show in revised version)

== Songs (Korea) ==
Act I

- Prologue - Vampire Slaves
- The Master's Song - Renfield, Jonathan, & Vampire Slaves
- Jonathan's Arrival - Renfield, Jonathan, & Vampire Slaves
- Solitary Man - Dracula, Jonathan, & Ensemble
- Jonathan's Bedroom - Dracula, Jonathan, & Ensemble
- Whitby Bay - Dracula, Mina, & Jonathan
- Underscore - Dracula, Mina, & Jonathan
- Dracula's Exit - Dracula & Jonathan
- Forever Young - Jonathan & Vampire Slaves
- Fresh Blood - Dracula, Jonathan, & Vampire Slaves
- Transition Blood to Asylum - Van Helsing, Renfield, Jack, & Ensemble
- The Master's Song - Van Helsing, Renfield, Jack, & Ensemble
- Last Man Standing - Van Helsing & Ensemble
- Transition and Underscore- Dracula, Mina, & Lucy
- Intro to How Do You Choose - Mina, Lucy, Jack, Quincey, Arthur, & Ensemble
- How Do You Choose - Mina, Lucy, Jack, Quincey, Arthur, & Ensemble
- Lucy & Dracula (I) - Dracula, Mina, & Lucy
- The Mist - Mina & Lucy
- Underscore - Mina & Lucy
- The Mist - (Reprise) - Mina & Lucy
- A Perfect Life/Loving You Keeps Me Alive/Whitby Bay (Reprise) - Dracula, Mina, & Jonathan
- Weddings - Dracula, Mina, Jonathan, Lucy, Quincey, Arthur, & Ensemble
- Wedding to Salon - Dracula, Van Helsing, Lucy, Jack, Quincey, Arthur, & Vampire Slaves
- Transition to Lucy's Bedroom - Dracula, Van Helsing, Lucy, Jack, Quincy, Arthur, & Vampire Slaves
- The Invitation - Dracula, Van Helsing, Lucy, Jack, Quincey, Arthur, & Vampire Slaves
- Lucy & Dracula (II) - Dracula, Van Helsing, Lucy, Jack, Quincey, Arthur, & Vampire Slaves
- Nosferatu Recit - Van Helsing, Lucy, Jack, Quincey, & Arthur
- Nosferatu - Van Helsing, Lucy, Jack, Quincey, & Arthur
- Lucy's Funeral - Mina, Van Helsing, Jonathan, Jack, Quincey, Arthur, & Ensemble
- Life After Life - Dracula, Lucy, Vampire Brides, & Ensemble

Act II

- Entr’Acte
- Lucy With Child - Lucy & Mina
- Undead One - Mina, Van Helsing, Jonathan, Lucy, Jack, Quincey, Arthur, & Men
- Please Don't Make Me Love You - Dracula, Mina, & Van Helsing
- Salon to Asylum - Dracula, Mina, & Van Helsing
- The Master's Song (Reprise) - Dracula, Mina, Van Helsing, Renfield, Jack, & Ensemble
- If I Could Fly - Mina
- Mina's Seduction - Dracula & Mina
- It's Over - Dracula, Mina, Van Helsing, Jonathan, Jack, Quincey, & Arthur
- It's Over Play Off & Transition - Dracula, Mina, Van Helsing, Jonathan, Jack, Quincey, & Arthur
- You Have My Word - Mina, Van Helsing, Jonathan, Jack, Quincey, & Arthur
- Before the Summer Ends - Mina & Jonathan
- Train Sequence - Dracula, Mina, & Van Helsing
- Deep in the Darkest Night - Mina, Van Helsing, Jonathan, Jack, Quincey, Arthur, & Ensemble
- The Longer I Live - Dracula
- Quincey's Death - Van Helsing, Jonathan, Jack, Quincey, & Arthur
- At Last - Dracula & Mina
- Finale - Dracula & Mina
- Bows

== Casts ==
Role	La Jolla (2001)	Broadway (2004)	St. Gallen (2005)	Graz (2007)	Studio Cast Recording (2011)
Count Dracula	Tom Hewitt	Tom Hewitt	Thomas Borchert Drew Sarich	Thomas Borchert	James Barbour
Mina Murray	Jenn Morse	Melissa Errico	Ann Christin Elverum	Lyn Liechty	Kate Shindle
Jonathan Harker	Tom Stewart	Darren Ritchie	Jesper Tydén	Jesper Tydén	Rob Evan
Abraham Van Helsing	Tom Flynn	Stephen Henderson	Chris Murray	Uwe Kröger	Norm Lewis
John Seward	Joe Cassidy	Shonn Wiley	Alen Hodzovic	Rory Six	Norm Lewis
Lucy Westenra	Amy Rutberg	Kelli O'Hara	Caroline Vasicek	Caroline Vasicek	Lauren Kennedy
Renfield	William Youmans	Don Stephenson	Stephan Vinzberg	Eric Minsk	Euan Morton
Arthur Holmwood	Chris Hoch	Chris Hoch	Martin Pasching	Lucius Wolter	N/A
Quincey Morris	Lee Morgan	Bart Shatto	Frank Winkels	Robert D. Marx	N/A

== Critical response ==
Wildhorn musicals usually endured critical derision, and Dracula would prove to be no exception. Reviews were universally negative, referring to the lyrics as unoriginal, and to the music as monotonous and derivative of both Andrew Lloyd Webber and Wildhorn's previous productions. Though this production was intended as a serious, dramatic interpretation of the source material, critics complained of a complete lack of emotion in general, and of suspense and horror in particular. Also, while the plot of the musical hits all the major points of Stoker's novel, critics felt it did so in such an obtuse way that audience members unfamiliar with the story may find themselves unable to comprehend the action.

However the new, revised version, that opened in Graz, Austria, in the Summer of 2007 was very successful among critics and audiences. The version of the show licensed by Music Theatre International is based on this production. A Cast Recording was released in 2008 and was a huge hit in the sale charts.

The South Korean production was met with overwhelmingly positive critical reception, and has since enjoyed additional runs, with reviewers praising its dark tone, spectacular staging, lush sets, impressive special effects, expanded emotional depth, and strong performances from its cast, particularly Kim Junsu as Dracula. The production introduced several more revisions to the book. Most notably, the production reinstated the concept of Mina being the reincarnation of Dracula's deceased wife, echoing the interpretation popularized by the Coppola film, and added two new numbers: "She," a solo for Dracula, examining his origins and amplifying his profound loneliness, and "Last Man Standing," for Van Helsing, which likewise deepens the character's complex bond with his vampire nemesis

== Recordings ==
Concept Album
Recorded in 2005. A concept recording created by GlobalVision Records and was released on Amazon MP3 and iTunes on June 6, 2011. It features James Barbour in the title role alongside Kate Shindle as Mina, Lauren Kennedy as Lucy, Rob Evan as Harker, Norm Lewis as Van Helsing, and Euan Morton as Reinfeld.

World Premiere Recording - Austrian Cast
In 2008 was released the first Cast Recording of the show, produced by HitSquad Records with the Cast of the Summer Festival in Graz, Austria. The CD contains the new, revised, re-orchestrated version of the show, being now quite different from the Broadway flop. The CD features Thomas Borchert as Dracula, Uwe Kröger as Van Helsing, Jesper Tydén as Jonathan, Lyn Liechty as Mina and Caroline Vasicek as Lucy. The new German version was a hit, and the CD was for almost half a year in the top of sales at Soundofmusic-shop.de the biggest Musical-Related store in Continental Europe.

10th Anniversary Cast Recording - South Korean Cast
On November 7, 2023, the South Korean Cast Recording was announced to commemorate the production's 10th anniversary, finally being released on June 5, 2024. Three, separate recordings were released in total, for each alternate cast. They included Kim Junsu, Jeon Dong-seok, and Shin Seong-rok as Dracula, Lim Hye-young, Jeong Seon-ah, and Ivy as Mina, Son Jun- ho, Park Eun-seok as Van Helsing, Jin Tae-hwa, and Lim Jun-hyuk as Jonathan Harker, Lee Ye-eun, and Choi Seo-yeon as Lucy, Do-hyeon Kim, and Do-ha Kim as Renfield, Jaehyun Lee as Dr. Seward, Lee Ho-jin as Arthur Holmwood, and Min Jun-ho as Quincey Morris.

Demo/Promotional Recordings

- Demo Recording (2000) - featuring Douglas Sills as Dracula, Christiane Noll as Mina, Alice Ripley as Lucy, Rob Evan as Harker, Chuck Wagner as Van Helsing and William Youmans as Reinfeld.
- Guy LeMonnier Demo (2003) - featuring Guy LeMonnier as Dracula.
- Broadway Promo (2004) - featuring Tom Hewitt as Dracula, Melissa Errico as Mina, Lauren Kennedy as Lucy and Rob Evan as Harker.

== Sources ==
The Musical Dracula 드라큘라 (Program book) (in Korean and English). Seoul: OD Company. 2026.
