= Drew Sarich =

American actor

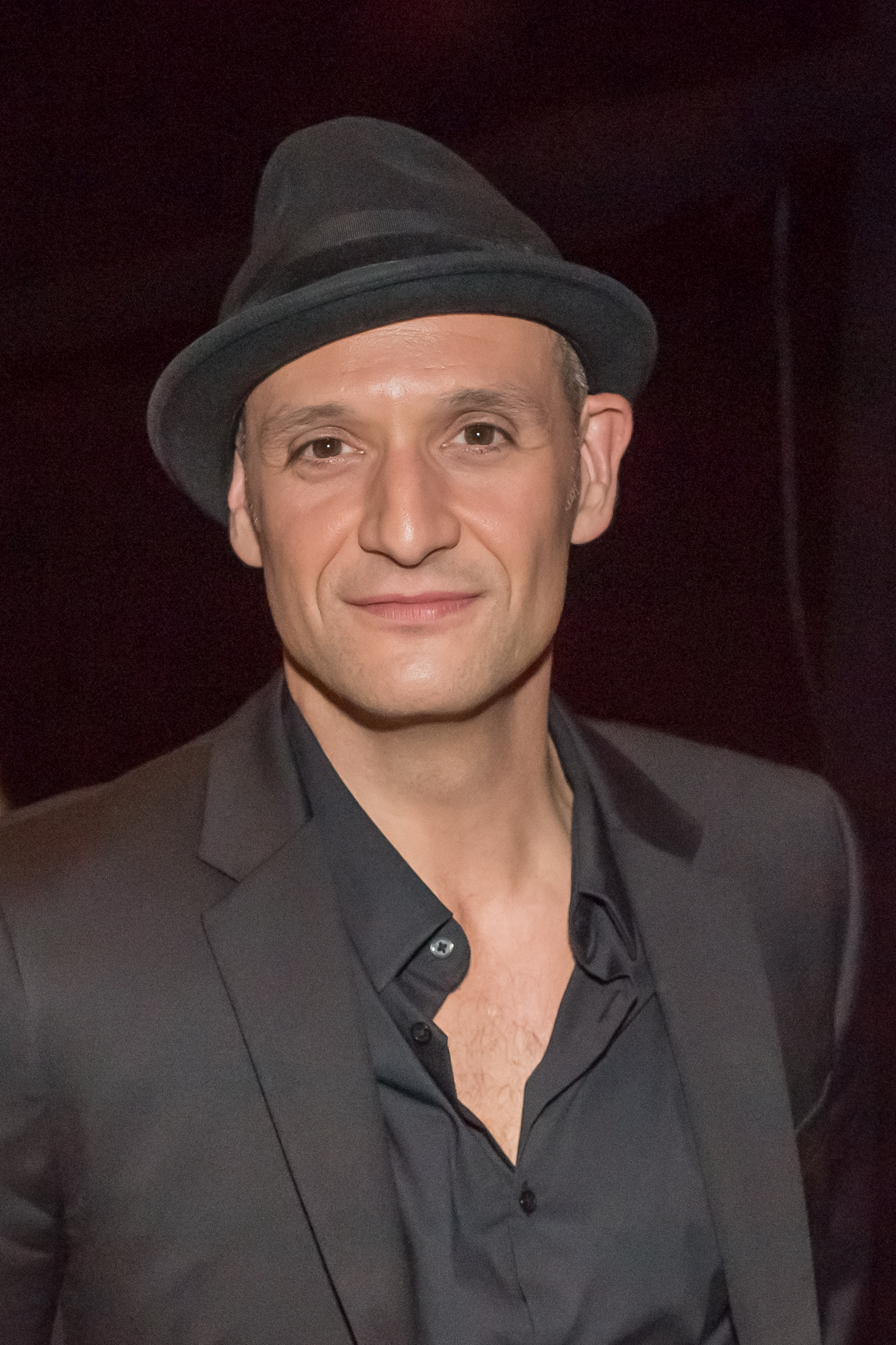
- Sarich in 2019
- Born: August 24, 1975 (age 51); St. Louis, Missouri, U.S.
- Education: Boston Conservatory (BFA)
- Occupations: Actor, singer
- Years active: 1997–present
- Spouse: Ann Mandrella

Drew Sarich (born August 24, 1975) is an American stage actor and singer songwriter from St. Louis, who performs in the English and German languages.

== Biography ==
Sarich received a Bachelor of Fine Arts in Musical Theatre with a concentration in Directing from Boston Conservatory in 1997. He made his Off-Broadway debut in Tony n' Tina's Wedding, followed by a tour as a backup singer for Liza Minnelli with the Cortes Alexander Trio. In 1998, he played Judas in a production of Jesus Christ Superstar in Nyack, New York, opposite Billy Porter.

In 1999, Sarich moved to Berlin to star as Quasimodo in the world premiere of Der Glöckner von Notre Dame. In 2000, he released his first album, Say It, with his self-titled "Drew Sarich Band". He moved to Vienna and played Berger in the Vienna revival of Hair, Cousin Kevin in Tommy (Amstetten, Austria), and the title role in Hedwig and the Angry Inch (Berlin). He has also appeared in Lapdog and Wildcat in 2003, which he co-wrote with his wife, Ann Mandrella.

Sarich appeared in other musicals while in Europe. He played the title character(s) in Jekyll and Hyde in Cologne, followed by Sun/Master of the Keys in Barbarella (opened March 11, 2004) in Vienna.

In St. Gallen he played the title role in Dracula, the Musical (sharing the role with Thomas Borchert).

Sarich made his Broadway debut in Spring 2006, when he took on the role of Armand in the musical Lestat. He had previously covered the roles of Armand and Lestat in the show's run in San Francisco while playing the role of Laurent, prior to taking over the role of Armand with the departure of Jack Noseworthy. Sarich played the title role for the two performances on May 27, 2006 (the day before Lestat's closing) when Hugh Panaro was out sick late in the production's run in New York. Lestat closed on May 28, 2006

In Summer 2006, Sarich took over for Rodney Hicks in the Off-Broadway show Jacques Brel is Alive and Well and Living in Paris, starring alongside Robert Cuccioli Natascia Diaz and Gay Marshall.

Sarich played the role of Grantaire (as well as the Innkeeper and a worker) in the Broadway revival of Les Misérables from October 2006 through the beginning of July 2007, understudying the roles of Enjolras and Javert. Later in July, following Alexander Gemignani's departure from the show, Sarich was chosen to take over the production's lead role of Jean Valjean until October 2007, when he traded locales with West End veteran John Owen-Jones. Sarich began as the West End Valjean on October 22, 2007, and Owen-Jones had his Broadway premiere as Valjean on October 23. Sarich's run in the London production ended on November 8, 2008.

Sarich has frequently performed the roles of Jesus and Judas in Jesus Christ Superstar in numerous theaters in Austria and Germany.

2009 – 2010 Sarich premiered in the title role of Rudolf – Affaire Mayerling at the Raimund Theater in Vienna.

Sarich took over as Graf von Krolock in the Vienna production of Tanz der Vampire. He made his debut on 6 November 2010 and played the role until 2012 and then again in 2017 and 2018 in Vienna.

In 2011, he took on the role of Curtis Shank in the musical rendition of Sister Act in Vienna.

From 2012 to 2015 Sarich performed the title role in the world premiere of Rocky das Musical in Hamburg.

In October 2013, he starred as The Phantom in a German-translated concert rendition of Andrew Lloyd Webber's Love Never Dies in Vienna.

In, 2015 he performed with Alfie Boe in Classic Quadrophenia – The Who at the Konzerthaus in Vienna.

In 2016, Sarich played the role of Ché in Evita in Vienna's Ronacher theater. He played Jamie in The Last Five Years in Vienna in between 2018 and 2019. From 2017 until 2022 he played Antonio Vivaldi in Vivaldi – The Fifth Season / Vivaldi – Die fünfte Jahreszeit at the Volksoper Vienna. The composer Christian Kolonovits created this Ba-Rock Musical having Drew Sarich in mind for the role.

Between 2018 and 2026, Sarich played various roles at the Volksoper Vienna: Robert Baker in Wonderful Town, Daddy Brubeck in Sweet Charity, The Wolf/Cinderella's Prince in Into the Woods, Albin/Zaza in La Cage aux Folles and Benjamin Stone in Follies.

Since 2023, Sarich regularly stars as Hedwig in Hedwig and the Angry Inch at the Vindobona in Vienna.

In 2024, he received the German Musical Award as best main actor for his role as Juanita in Kasimir und Karoline at the Staatsoper Hannover.

In 2026 he sang Amanda in the English version of Amanda, The Night before me, composed by Rory Six, at Theater Spittelberg in Vienna.

== Stage roles ==
Year(s)	Production	Role	Theatre	Location
1997	Tony n' Tina's Wedding	Donnie Dolce	St Lukes Theatre	Off-Broadway, New York, USA
1998	Jesus Christ Superstar	Judas Iscariot	Helen Hayes Performing Arts Center	New York, USA
1999	Der Glöckner von Notre Dame	Quasimodo	Theater am Potsdamer Platz	Berlin, Germany
2000	Hair	Berger	Raimundtheater	Vienna, Austria
2002	The Who's Tommy	Cousin Kevin	Amstetten	Amstetten, Austria
2002	Hedwig and the Angry Inch	Hedwig	Glashaus	Berlin, Germany
2003	Lapdog 'n Wildcat		Metropol	Vienna, Austria
2003	Jekyll and Hyde	Dr. Henry Jekyll / Edward Hyde	Hanneschen-Theater	Cologne, Germany
2004	Barbarella	Sun / Master of the Keys	Raimundtheater	Vienna, Austria
2004	Jesus Christ Superstar	Jesus of Nazareth	in concert	Passau, Germany
2005	Jesus Christ Superstar	Jesus of Nazareth	in concert	Vienna, Austria
2005	Jesus Christ Superstar	Judas Iscariot	Amstetten, Austria	Amstetten, Austria
2005	Dracula, the Musical	Dracula	Theater St. Gallen	St. Gallen, Switzerland
2005	Lestat	Laurent u/s Lestat u/s Armand	Curran Theatre	San Francisco, USA
2006	Lestat	Armand u/s Lestat	Palace Theater	Broadway, USA
2006	Jacques Brel is Alive and Well and Living in Paris	Man #2	Zipper Theatre	Off-Broadway, NY, USA
2006-07	Les Misérables	Grantaire u/s Inspector Javert u/s Enjolras	Broadhurst Theatre	Broadway, NY, USA
2007	Les Misérables	Inspector Javert	Broadhurst Theatre	Broadway, NY, USA
2007	Les Misérables	Jean Valjean	Broadhurst Theatre	Broadway, NY, USA
2007-08	Les Misérables	Jean Valjean	Queen's Theatre	West End, London, England
2008	Jesus Christ Superstar	Jesus of Nazareth	Stadthalle	Vienna, Austria
2009	Rudolf Affaire Mayerling	Crown prince Rudolf	Raimund Theater	Vienna, Austria
2010	Evita	Ché	Magdeburg	Germany
2010	Tanz der Vampire	Graf Von Krolock	Raimund Theater	Vienna, Austria
2011	Jesus Christ Superstar	Jesus of Nazareth	Ronacher	Vienna, Austria
2011	Sister Act	Curtis Jackson/Shank	Ronacher	Vienna, Austria
2011-12	Tanz der Vampire	Graf Von Krolock	Palladium Theater	Berlin, Germany
2012	Jesus Christ Superstar	Jesus of Nazareth	Ronacher	Vienna, Austria
2012-2015	Rocky das Musical	Rocky Balboa	Operettenhaus	Hamburg, Germany
2012	Chess (Actors' Fund Benefit Concert)	Frederick Trumper, The American	Lincoln Center	New York, USA
2013	Love Never Dies	The Phantom of the Opera	Ronacher	Vienna, Austria
2015	Jesus Christ Superstar	Jesus of Nazareth	Raimund Theater	Vienna, Austria
2015	Classic Quadrophenia - The Who		Konzerthaus Vienna	Vienna, Austria
2016	Evita	Ché	Raimund Theater	Vienna, Austria
2018	Wonderful Town	Robert Baker	Volksoper	Vienna, Austria
2019	Kiss of the Spider Woman	Molina	Bühne Baden	Baden, Austria
2020	Sweet Charity	Daddy Brubeck	Volksoper	Vienna, Austria
2021	Into the Woods	The Wolf / Cinderella's Prince	Volksoper	Vienna, Austria
2021-2022	The Secret Party - Jacques Brel 1968	Solist	Das Vindobona	Vienna, Austria
2022	La Cage aux Folles	Albin alias Zaza	Volksoper	Vienna, Austria
2022	Nine	Guido Contini	Bühne Baden	Baden, Austria
2023	Hedwig and the Angry Inch	Hedwig	Das Vindobona	Vienna, Austria
2023	Jesus Christ Superstar	Jesus of Nazareth	Raimund Theater	Vienna, Austria
2023	Cabaret	The Emcee	Bühne Baden	Baden, Austria
2023	La Cage aux Folles	Albin alias Zaza	Volksoper	Vienna, Austria
2023	Kasimir und Karoline	Juanita	Staatsoper Hannover	Hanover, Germany
2024	Hedwig and the Angry Inch	Hedwig	Das Vindobona	Vienna, Austria
2024	Kasimir und Karoline	Juanita	Staatsoper Hannover	Hanover, Germany
2024	Spamalot	Sir Galahad, The Black Knight, Herbert's father	Bühne Baden	Baden, Austria
2025	La Cage aux Folles	Albin alias Zaza	Volksoper	Vienna, Austria
2025	Follies	Benjamin Stone	Volksoper	Vienna, Austria
2025	Chess	Frederick Trumper, The American	Bühne Baden	Baden, Austria
2026	Hedwig and the Angry Inch	Hedwig	Das Vindobona	Vienna, Austria
2026	Jesus Christ Superstar in Concert	Jesus	Tour	Vienna, Austria Graz, Austria Amstetten, Austria München, Germany
2026	Follies	Benjamin Stone	Volksoper	Vienna, Austria
2026	The Night before Me	Amanda	Theater am Spittelberg	Vienna Austria
2026	La Cage aux Folles	Albin / Zaza	Seefestspiele Mörbisch	Mörbisch, Austria
2026	The Addams Familiy	Gomez Addams	Bühne Baden	Baden, Austria

== Discography ==
=== Cast Recordings ===
- Disneys “Der Glöckner von Notre Dame” original cast album 1999
- “Hair” Vienna cast recording 2001
- „Barbarella“ Vienna cast (limited edition) 2004
- “Jesus Christ Superstar” Vienna cast 2006
- “Rudolf – Affaire Mayerling” – cast album 2010
- “Jesus Christ Superstar” – live recording 2011
- „Tut Ankh Amon The Musical“ original Cairo cast 2011 HitSquad Records
- „Sister Act“ – original Vienna cast 2011
- “ROCKY – Das Musical” 2012
- „Die Moulin Rouge Story“ – Studio-Cast-CD 2015
- „Luther – Rebell Gottes“ 2016
- „Luna“ concept album 2017
- “Vivaldi – Die Fünfte Jahreszeit” original cast recording 2017
- „Tanz der Vampire – Die 3 Grafen“ 2018

The Lestat original Broadway cast recording was recorded by Mercury Records on May 22, 2006, at Sony Studios in New York City, but never released.

=== Musical-DVD's ===
- „Rudolf – Affaire Mayerling“ 2010
- „Vivaldi – Die Fünfte Jahreszeit“ 2017

=== Studio albums and EP's ===
- "Say It” Bassball Productions 2000
- „I.V.“ Drew Sarich and International Victim Soulmade Productions 2005
- “Silent Symphony” Endwerk Records 2011
- “Snowfall Single” Endwerk Records 2012
- “Let Him Go” Endwerk Records 2016
- “Secrets” Endwerk Records 2018
- “Hunting For Heaven” Endwerk Records 2019
- “Behave” EP Endwerk Records 2020
- “Cancel Christmas” Endwerk Records 2020
- „Wishes & Wonders“ Endwerk Records 2021
- „HILLS“ EP Statesman Sound 2022
- „Look Alive“ EP Statesman Sound 2022
- "Never with You" Music Video 2023
- "Nothing to lose...But it all" single (Everyone's Darling) Statesman Sound 2024
- "Supervillain" single (Everyone's Darling) Statesman Sound 2024
- "Blisters" single (Everyone's Darling) Statesman Sound 2024
- "Day-Glo Dolly" single (Everyone`s Darling) Statesman Sound 2025
- "Scarstruck" single (Everyone`s Darling) Statesman Sound 2025
- "City of Night" single (Everyone's Darling) Statesman Sound 2025
- "Nothing To Lose...But It All!! EP (Everyone's Darling) Statesman Sound 2025
- "Nobody's Fault" single (Endwerk Orchester) Endwerk Records, 2026
- "Take What We Get" single (Everyone's Darling) Tape Capitol Music, 2026
- "Making the best of a Horrible Plan" single (Endwerk Orchester) Endwerk Records, 2026

=== Miscellaneous featuring Drew Sarich ===
- Varese Sarabande Records “Broadway sings Paul Simon” - "Bernadette" 1998
- Fred Eisler Camena to the Fallen (Guest Vocalist) 2005
- I Was Born To Love You (Rudolf - Affaire Mayerling promotional single featuring Lisa Antoni) (Vocalist) 2008
- More with every line - The music of Tim Prottey-Jones (Guest Vocalist) -"Rescue Remedy" 2010
- Move me (with Sonja Romei) 2011
- Come On Over (with Gabriela Ryffel - Mark Lanegan & Isobel Campbell cover, recorded at SAE Vienna) 2012
- Home, Christmas (with Gabriela Ryffel - Edward Sharpe and the Magnetic Zeros cover, recorded at SAE Vienna) 2012
- Nothin' Can Stop Me (Guest Vocalist on Bettina Meske's album "Made in Berlin") 2013
- Braucht uns ned wundern / No need to wonder (Guest Vocalist on Harald Baumgartner's album "Melancholerisch") 2014
- “FALCO: Coming HomeTribute” Live from the Donauinselfest 2017
- „Joyful!“ Drew Sarich and Vienna's biggest christmas choir 2019
- "Melody of Broadway, the texts of Wolfgang Adenberg“ 2020
- „At the Movies“ Sound of Music Concerts 2021
- „Nautilus – Ludwig Coss“ HitSquad Records PreCast 2022
- "Would you call this love" Andie Gabauer (music) featuring Drew Sarich (lyrics) 2024
- "Red Blue Sky" "Liquid Fire" Miguel Kertsman, Album "Paradoxes". Vocals Drew Sarich 2025

== Awards ==
- 2017: Austrian musical theater Krone award – for his role as Che in Evita
- 2017: German musical theater award for best main actor Deutscher Musical Theater Preis for his role as Antonio Vivaldi in Vivaldi – The Fifth Season
- 2018 BroadwayWorld Austria Award for his role as count Krolock in Dance of the Vampires
- 2019 BroadwayWorld Austria Award for his role as Jesus in Jesus Christ Superstar
- 2020 BroadwayWorld Austria Award Vocalist of the decade
- 2024 German musical theater award best main actor for his role as Juanita in Kasimir und Karoline at Staatsoper Hannover
- 2025 BroadwayWorld Austria Award for his role as Frederick Trumper in Chess at Bühne Baden
