= Jerzy Jeszke =

Polish actor and singer

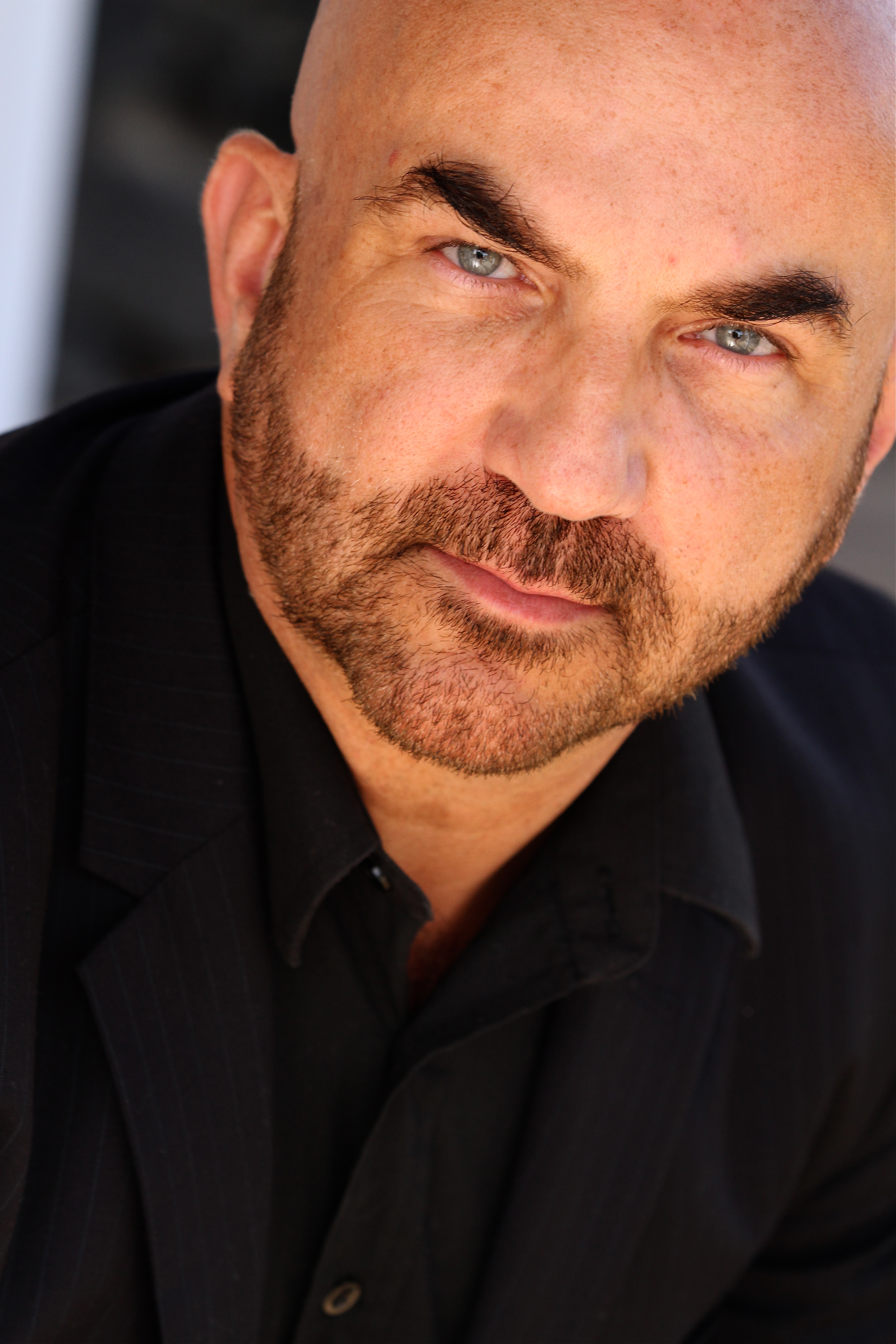
Jerzy Jeszke in 2012

Jerzy Jeszke (Polish pronunciation: [ˈjɛʐɨ ˈjɛʂkɛ]; born 2 November 1958) is a Polish theatre actor and singer, whose considered as one of Poland's most successful theatre actors. From 28 August 2020, Jeszke is serving a three-year jail sentence for the rape of his ex-girlfriend.

== Life and work ==
Born in Bytów, he started his four-year-long studies of acting and singing at the "Studio" Danuta Baduszkowa in 1976 and completed it with honours in 1980. At the age of 17, he started his career in Poland (from 1976 to 1987) – musical theatre in Gdynia, State Operetta (now: Teatr Roma) in Warsaw, musical theatre in Chorzów, State Opera in Wrocław and Krynica Jan Kiepura Festival. From 1987 until 1992 he had his first engagement outside Poland, first as a choir and single singer, from 1990 as a solo artist at the music theatre in Oberhausen, Germany, so he moved there. In 1992 he obtained an international diploma for an opera singer at Kammeroper Vienna. In 1993, as a guest at: Opera Spanga, Opera Royal de Wallonie, Opera Obihiro, Wiener Kammeroper.

In 1994, on the occasion of the final casting led by Sir Cameron Mackintosh in London, Jerzy Jeszke was chosen as "The Engineer" for the German première of "Miss Saigon" in Stuttgart, as first cast of this role (production: Cameron Mackintosh Ltd. and Stella Musical Company).

In 1995, after the final casting organized by Sir Cameron Mackintosh in London and in Hamburg he appeared as first cast in the role of "Jean Valjean" at the German first performance of "Les Misérables" at the "Musical Theatre" in Duisburg (production: Cameron Mackintosh Ltd. and Stella Musical Company). and received Tony Award (1996, Best Musical). At the international gala because of the 10th anniversary of the musical "Les Misérables" which took place in 1995 at the Royal Albert Hall in London(production: Cameron Mackintosh Ltd.), he represented Germany in the same role, so did he at the opening event of the Football European-Championship's final game 1996 at the Wembley Stadium in London, where he was one of 17 world's best "Jean Valjean"-actors (production: Cameron Mackintosh Ltd.). He had one-year scholarship on West End London (1996). In 1997, he was "Jean Valjean" as a guest-star in the Polish production by Sir Cameron Mackintosh at the musical theatre in Gdynia. In 1997 he won the final casting led by Roman Polanski in Vienna to the new production of the cult musical "The fearless Vampire Killers" (production: Stage Holding) under the direction of Roman Polanski. From March 1998, he could have been seen as guest-star in the title role of "The Phantom of the Opera" in Hamburg.

Later in 1998 he succeeded in "The Phantom of the Opera"-casting in Hamburg, which has been held on Broadway (New York City) by producer Harold Prince and Andrew Lloyd Webber. He was chosen to play the "Phantom" as first cast in this musical at the theatre "Neue Flora", Hamburg, starting in January 1999 (production: Cameron Mackintosh Ltd., Andrew Lloyd Webber's Really Useful Group and Stella Musical Company). He had concerts on Broadway ("Music of the Night", 1998). At the beginning of 2002, Jerzy Jeszke played as a guest-star the role of the "Engineer" in "Miss Saigon" at the musical theatre Roma in Warsaw, Poland. In October 2002, he took part in the world première of the musical production "The Castle" in Nuremberg, Germany, the world's first première, in which he appeared in the role of "King Duncan". From March 2003, he could have been seen as first cast in the role of "Jean Valjean" in the new production of "Les Misérables" at the Anhaltisches Theater in Dessau. Starting in December 2003 he played the role of "Chagal" as first cast in the new production of the cult musical "Dance of the Vampires" (production: Stage Holding) under the direction of Roman Polanski at the "Theater Neue Flora" in Hamburg. Jerzy Jeszke decided in 2006 to make a new artistic experience without comfort and glamour. He performed as a street artist for poor and homeless people in many European cities. In the beginning of 2007 he transferred his artistic interest towards Iberia. On the island of Majorca he presented several times his live solo programme "Broadway Live Show", also for the José-Carreras-Foundation. From October 2007 he has been on stage as "Chagal" at the "Theater des Westens" in Berlin (production: Stage Entertainment). At the same time, he played as guest the role of "Jesus" in Jesus Christ Superstar at the Musikalische Komödie in Leipzig. He played the "Chagal" as first cast in "Dance of the Vampires" by Roman Polanski (production: Stage Entertainment): from November 2008 to January 2010 at the "Metronom Theater" in Oberhausen and from February to September 2010 at the "Palladium Theater" in Stuttgart. Besides, he appeared – as during the season 2007–2008 – in the role of the "King" in the musical "The King and I" at the "Anhaltisches Theater" in Dessau. Since September 2010 he played as a guest-star the role of "King Arthur" in the Polish first première of Monty Python's Broadway musical hit "Spamalot" at the musical theatre in Gdynia. In November 2011 appeared on TVN television series "Warsaw Pact" as "Wolf".

Jerzy Jeszke founded the Jerzy Jeszke Art Foundation. A nonprofit organization helps and supports young and talented artists. In February 2012 appeared on TVP television series "M jak miłość". Since May 2012 he played as special guest the role of "Beadle Bamford/Mr Fogg" in the Polish first première of Broadway musical hit "Sweeney Todd" at the musical theatre in Chorzow. After winning the final casting organized in Amsterdam and Hamburg he plays since July 2012 the first cast of "Chagal" in the musical "Dance of the Vampires" (production: Stage Entertainment) under the direction of Roman Polanski at the Theater des Westens in Berlin. In October 2012 at the international gala because of the 15th anniversary of the musical "Dance of the Vampires" he had the role of Chagal at Stage Theater des Westens in Berlin (production: Stage Entertainment).

== Repertoire and engagements ==
The repertoire of Jerzy Jeszke ranges from chansons to musicals and opera, to rock and pop music. Engagements and concerts in Germany, Poland, Italy, the Netherlands, England, Spain, Portugal, Turkey, Mexico, Egypt, the Czech Republic, Russia, Tunisia and Japan have been stations in his current career. Since his debut as a 17-year-old till today Jerzy Jeszke has been performed in over 60 premières in over six languages, in the opera as well as in the modern musical. He played among others the "David" in the musical "Seesaw" by Cy Coleman, "Judas" in "Jesus Christ Superstar" by Andrew Lloyd Webber, "Prince Sou-Chong" in "The Land of Smiles" by Franz Lehár, "Caramello" in "One night in Venice" by Richard Strauss, "Pinkerton" in "Madame Butterfly" by Puccini, "Jontek" in "Halka" by Moniuszko and "Hoffmann" in "The Tales of Hoffmann" by Jacques Offenbach. Besides appearances in television and radio Jerzy Jeszke sang at numerous national and international galas (Royal Albert Hall; Wembley Stadium, London; Congress Hall, Warsaw; Castel Gandolfo, Rome; Schloss Bellevue, Berlin; José Carreras foundation, Majorca). He was exclusively engaged for Pope John Paul II, Roman Herzog, Mikhail Gorbachev, Lech Wałęsa and US-senator Zbigniew Brzezinski. The music of Jerzy Jeszke can be heard on the CD of the German production of "Les Misérables" as "Jean Valjean" and on his own CDs "Who I am?" and "Tell me why?" with the greatest hits of musicals, pop-classic and classic. A new solo CD with rock opera music is being prepared for 2012.

== Actor's path ==
Year	Name of the Play	Role	Place of the Play
07/2012–	The fearless Vampire Killers	"Chagal"	Theater des Westens, Berlin, D
05/2012–	Sweeney Todd	"Beadle Bamford/Mr Fogg" (special guest)	Teatr Rozrywki, Chorzow, PL
09/2010–	Spamalot	"King Arthur" (guest)	Teatr Muzyczny, Gdynia, PL
02/2010 – 09/2010	The fearless Vampire Killers	"Chagal"	Palladium-Theater, Stuttgart, D
11/2008 – 02/2010	The fearless Vampire Killers	"Chagal"	Metronom-Theater, Oberhausen, D
2007–2008	The fearless Vampire Killers	"Chagal"	Theater des Westens, Berlin, D
2007–2009	The King and I	"King"	Anhaltisches Theater, Dessau, D
2007–2008	Jesus Christ Superstar	"Jesus"	Musikalische Komödie, Leipzig, D
2003–2008	Les Misérables	"Jean Valjean"	Anhaltisches Theater, Dessau, D
2003–2006	The fearless Vampire Killers	"Chagal"	Theater Neue Flora, Hamburg, D
2003–2004	Les Misérables	"Jean Valjean"	Landestheater Detmold, D
2002–2003	The Castle	"King Duncan"	Theater Nuremberg, D
2002	Miss Saigon	"Engineer"	Theatre ROMA Warsaw, PL
1999–2001	The Phantom of the Opera	"Phantom"	Theater Neue Flora, Hamburg, D
1998	The Phantom of the Opera	"Phantom" (guest)	Theater Neue Flora, Hamburg, D
1997	Les Misérables	"Jean Valjean" (guest)	Teatr Muzyczny Gdynia, PL
1996–1998	Les Misérables	"Jean Valjean"	Musicaltheatre Duisburg, D
8 October 1995	Les Misérables	"Jean Valjean" (guest)	Royal Albert Hall, London, GB
1994–1995	Miss Saigon	"Engineer"	Musical-Hall Apollo-Theater, Stuttgart, D
1993	The Land of Smiles	"Prince Sou-Chong"	Städtisches Theater, Oberhausen, D
1993	Rise and Fall of the City Mahagonny	"Jimmy Mahoney"	Musicaltheater Dresden, D
1992	The Tales of Hoffmann	"Hoffmann" (guest)	Spanga, Netherlands
1992	The Marriage of Figaro	"Don Basilio / Don Curzio" (guest)	Opera Obihiro, Japan
1991	The Land of Smiles	"Prince Sou Chong"	Städtisches Theater, Oberhausen, D
1991	The Christmas Story	"Bob Cratchit"	Städtisches Theater, Oberhausen, D
1991	Romeo and Julia	"Tybald"	Städtisches Theater, Oberhausen, D
1990	Halka	"Jontek"	Städtisches Theater, Oberhausen, D
1989	Madame Favart	"Hector"	Städtisches Theater, Oberhausen, D
1989	Fidelio	"Prisoner"	Städtisches Theater, Oberhausen, D
1987	Fallstaff	"Dr. Cajus"	Städtisches Theater, Oberhausen, D
1987	Jesus Christ Superstar	"Judasz" (guest)	Teatr Muzyczny Gdynia, PL
1986	Madame Butterfly	"Pinkerton"(guest)	State Opera Wrocław, PL
1986	Seesaw	"David" (guest)	State Operetta Warsaw (now: Theatre Roma Warsaw), PL
1985	Seesaw	"David" (guest)	Musical Theatre, Chorzow, PL
1985	Księżniczka Czardasza	"Boni"	State Operetta Warsaw (now: Theatre Roma Warsaw), PL
1985	One Night in Venice	"Caramello"	State Operetta Warsaw (now: Theatre Roma Warsaw), PL
1985	My Fair Lady	"Fred"	State Operetta Warsaw (now: Theatre Roma Warsaw), PL
1984	Boso, ale w ostrogach	"Student"	State Operetta Warsaw (now: Theatre Roma Warsaw), PL
1984	Seesaw	"David"	State Operetta Warsaw (now: Theatre Roma Warsaw), PL
1983	Bal w Sawoju	"Mustapha Bey"	State Operetta Warsaw (now: Theatre Roma Warsaw), PL
1982	Rozkwit i Upadek Miasta Mahagonny	"Jimm"	Teatr Muzyczny Gdynia, PL
1982	Uciechy Staropolskie	"Sługa"	Teatr Muzyczny Gdynia, PL
1981	Wielki Świat	"Terrorysta"	Teatr Muzyczny Gdynia, PL
1980	Kolęda Nocka	"Kolędnik"	Teatr Muzyczny Gdynia, PL
1980	Piraci	"Fryderyk"	Teatr Muzyczny Gdynia, PL
1980	Słowik	"Dworzanin"	Teatr Muzyczny Gdynia, PL
1980 (dyplom IV roku SWA)	Alicja w Krainie Czarów	"Lokaj Żaba / Fałszywy Żółw"	Teatr Muzyczny Gdynia, PL
1979	Cud Mniemany, czyli Krakowiacy i Górale	"Jonek"	Opera Leśna, Sopot, PL
1979	Nowy Don Kiszot, czyli Sto Szaleństw	"Wieśniak VII"	Teatr Muzyczny Gdynia, PL
1979	Sekretny Przystanek	"Żołnierz"	Teatr Muzyczny Gdynia, PL
1978	Bal w Operze	"Gość"	Teatr Muzyczny Gdynia, PL
1978	Nasz Człowiek w Hawanie	"Zespół"	Teatr Muzyczny Gdynia, PL
1978	Stan Wyjątkowy	"Żołnierz"	Teatr Muzyczny Gdynia, PL
1978	Iwan Groźny	"Rosyjski Rycerz"	Polish TV, Gdańsk, PL
1978	Kram Karoliny	"Lalkarz/Arlekin"	Teatr Muzyczny Gdynia, PL
1977	Zielony Gil	"Strażnik"	Teatr Muzyczny Gdynia, PL
1977	Pinokio	"Zespół"	Opera Leśna, Sopot, PL
1977	Szwejk	"Tragarz / Policjant"	Teatr Muzyczny Gdynia, PL
1976	Fontanna z Neptunem	"Mieszczanin"	Teatr Muzyczny Gdynia, PL
1976	Promises-Promises	"Zespół"	Teatr Muzyczny Gdynia, PL
1976	Skowronek	"Zespół"	Teatr Muzyczny Gdynia, PL

== Rape ==
On 28 August 2020, Jeszke was sentenced to three years in prison for the rape of his ex-girlfriend in May 2019. Jeszke had sedated the victim with "knockout drops" before he raped her.

== Videos ==
- Jerzy Jeszke – Les Misérables – Who Am I (1996)
- Jerzy Jeszke – The Phantom of the Opera – Music of the Night
- Jerzy Jeszke – The Phantom of the Opera
- Jerzy Jeszke – The Producers – The King of Broadway

== Interviews and press ==
- Wiadomości24 (In Polish)
- Deutsche Welle (In Polish)
- Gazeta Świętojańska (In Polish)
- RTL TV (In German)
- Musicalstars live (In German)
- BLIZA Gdyński Kwartalnik Artystyczny (In Polish)
- Klub Miłośników Teatru Muzycznego w Gdyni (In Polish)
