= Dance of the Vampires (musical) =

Musical

Dance of the Vampires Tanz der Vampire
- Music: Jim Steinman
- Lyrics: Michael Kunze; Jim Steinman (English)
- Book: Michael Kunze; Jim Steinman (English); David Ives (English)
- Basis: 1967 Roman Polanski film, The Fearless Vampire Killers
- Productions: 1997 Vienna; 2000 Stuttgart; 2000 Tallinn; 2002 Broadway; 2003 Hamburg; 2005 Warsaw; 2006 Japan Tour; 2006 Berlin; 2008 Oberhausen; 2009 Vienna Revival; 2010 Stuttgart Revival; 2010 Antwerp; 2011 Nitra; 2011 Saint Petersburg; 2011 Seinäjoki; 2011 Berlin Revival; 2014 Paris; 2015 Japan Tour; 2016 Helsinki; 2016 Germany Tour; 2016 Saint Petersburg Revival; 2016 Prague; 2016 Moscow; 2017 St. Gallen; 2017 Vienna Revival; 2018 Berlin Revival; 2018 Saint Petersburg Revival; 2019 Germany Tour; 2019 Japan Tour; 2020 Copenhagen; 2022 Saint Petersburg Revival; 2023 Stuttgart Revival; 2025 Prague Revival

Dance of the Vampires is a musical adaptation of the 1967 Roman Polanski film (known as The Fearless Vampire Killers in the United States). Polanski also directed the musical’s original German-language production (titled Tanz der Vampire). The music was composed by Jim Steinman, orchestrated by Steve Margoshes, and Michael Kunze wrote the original German book and lyrics.

== Plot ==
Note: This synopsis applies to European and Japanese productions only. The Broadway version was heavily rewritten. In addition, portions of this synopsis may reflect later changes to the European show, which will become clear when reading the song list below.

=== Act I ===
Sometime in the early 20th century, Professor Abronsius and Alfred, his bumbling young assistant, arrive in a small Jewish shtetl somewhere in the Carpathians, where they hope to prove the professor's theory that vampires exist. Nearly freezing to death in the nearby woods (He, Ho, He), the two are taken in by Chagal, an innkeeper who spends most of his free time lusting after Magda, his beautiful chambermaid, much to the disdain of his long-suffering wife, Rebecca (Knoblauch – "Garlic"). The professor, upon noticing the countless strings of garlic hung about the place and around people's necks, is overjoyed, confident of the nearness of his goal, and immediately starts probing Chagal for information. The villagers, evidently frightened, pretend to be completely oblivious, silencing the local fool, who still manages to blurt something about the castle and the count that lives there. After exploring the rooms upstairs in which they are staying (Bitte, meine Herren – "Please, Gentlemen"), Alfred discovers and is smitten by Chagal's beautiful 17-year-old daughter, Sarah. Chagal is very protective of his child, going as far as boarding up her room so she wouldn't bathe around the two guests (Eine schöne Tochter ist ein Segen – "A Beautiful Daughter is a Blessing"). That night, Alfred and Sarah sing of their mutual attraction, while Chagal tries to coerce his way into Magda's bed and Abronsius is swiftly knocked on the head by Chagal's wife (Nie geseh'n – "Never Seen"). Unbeknownst to Alfred, late at night Sarah is serenaded by a mysterious stranger, who promises her eternal life and power (Gott ist tot – God is Dead").

The next morning, the Professor bears witness to a small business exchange between Chagal and Koukol, a hideous hunchback living somewhere in the woods (Alles ist hell – "Everything's Bright"). He inquires about the odd man (Wahrheit – "truth"), but Chagal refuses to discuss the matter. That same night, Sarah tricks Alfred into giving up his bath for her (Du bist wirklich sehr nett – "You're Really Very Nice") and as she joyfully soaps her sponge, Count von Krolock, an aristocratic vampire, breaks into the bathroom from the roof above and invites her to a midnight ball at his castle (Einladung zum Ball – "Invitation to the Ball"). He is about to bite the girl, but Alfred, who has been spying on Sarah's bathing ritual, screams for help. Chagal and Rebecca arrive, furious. Sarah's father spanks her and forbids her to ever go outside.

However, later that night, Koukol arrives at the inn and leaves a red bundle for Sarah on the doorstep. She sneaks outside and discovers it to be a pair of expensive red boots. Alfred comes outside as well and professes his love to her (Draußen ist Freiheit – "Outside is Freedom"). The two plan on running off together and Sarah asks Alfred to go back into the house to fetch her sponge. With Alfred gone, Sarah fantasizes about the fantastical, romantic vampire ball she could be missing and decides to accept the Count's invitation (Stärker als wir sind – "Stronger Than We Are"). She runs off into the woods. Alfred starts to panic, Chagal and Rebecca rush outside, but it's too late and Sarah's gone. Chagal wraps himself in garlic and runs into the woods after his daughter.

The next morning, Chagal's frozen body is found; Rebecca is devastated (Trauer um Chagal – "Mourning for Chagal"). Professor Abronsius discovers small puncture wounds all over the body, but the villagers, still in denial, incorrectly assume they came from wolf bites. The Professor hands Rebecca a wooden stake and explains she must puncture Chagal's heart in order to prevent him from becoming a vampire. Hysterical, Rebecca chases him and Alfred out of the room, covering her husband with a bed sheet and swearing that she would never let anyone violate his corpse.

In the middle of the night, Magda sneaks downstairs to look at Chagal's corpse, expressing mixed feelings about his death (Tot zu sein ist komisch - "To be Dead is Strange"). Suddenly, Chagal sits up, now a vampire. Magda tries to fend him off with a crucifix, but being a Jewish vampire, he manages to overpower her and feed on her blood, killing her in the process. Alfred and the Professor sneak into the room as well, planning to stake Chagal, but they find Magda's body there instead. A chase ensues and the two finally corner Chagal, who begs for mercy and promises to show them the route to the vampire's castle where his daughter supposedly is held if he's spared.

Chagal leads the two heroes to a giant castle in the woods (Durch die Wildnis zum Schloß – "Through the Wilderness to the Castle"), where they are greeted by the mysterious Count von Krolock and his flamboyant son Herbert, who is instantly attracted to Alfred (Vor dem Schloß – "In Front of the Castle"). Von Krolock invites the two men into his domain and the two reluctantly accept his invitation.

=== Act II ===
Sarah is now at Count von Krolock's castle, wandering the dark empty halls and considering what her relationship with the Count truly is. The Count appears to welcome her and manages to resist biting her, planning to save her for the ball the next night (Totale Finsternis – "Total Eclipse"). At the same time, Alfred is asleep with the Professor in a guest bedroom in another part of the castle, suffering from terrifying nightmares, with one nightmare in which he loses Sarah to the bloodthirsty vampires (Carpe Noctem - "Seize the Night").

The next morning, Alfred wants to find Sarah and flee the castle (Ein perfekter Tag / Für Sarah – "A Perfect Day / For Sarah"), but Professor Abronsius is more concerned with staking Von Krolock and Herbert. Alfred and the Professor make their way to the crypt (In der Gruft – "In the Crypt"), where they locate the two vampires. The Professor becomes stuck on a banister as he attempts to get into the crypt and assigns Alfred to kill von Krolock and his son, but Alfred can't bring himself to drive a stake through their hearts. Before the Professor can think of something else, he hears a noise and the hapless duo flee the crypt just as Chagal arrives with Magda's coffin. Magda climbs out, now a vampire, and finally concedes to having a sexual relationship with Chagal.

Alfred and the Professor continue searching the castle and separate in the library (Bücher, Bücher – "Books, Books"). Alfred comes across a small bedroom where he finds Sarah in the bathroom, apparently unharmed. Alfred begs for her to leave, but Sarah refuses, saying she wants to stay for the midnight ball. She coaxes Alfred to leave the room (involving another encounter in the library, Noch mehr Bücher – "Even More Books") while she gets dressed, but when Alfred returns, Sarah is gone, and Herbert is in her place. Herbert tries flirting with the confused and terrified "hero" (Wenn Liebe in dir Ist – "When Love is Inside You"), which culminates with him lunging at Alfred's neck, but the Professor comes in the nick of time and hits the young vampire with an umbrella.

As Alfred and the Professor make it outside, the sun sets and they are confronted by von Krolock, who mocks the Professor's naïve attempt to destroy him (Sie irren, Professor – "You're Wrong, Professor"). To their horror, the two watch a whole mob of vampires rise up from a nearby church yard and head towards the ballroom (Ewigkeit – "Eternity"). As the vampires leave their resting places, von Krolock reflects on his painful damnation as a member of the undead (Die unstillbare Gier – "The Insatiable Greed"), which Alfred overhears, but the Professor dismisses von Krolock as nothing more than a monster.

The vampires arrive in the castle and the ball begins (Tanzsaal – "The Dance Hall"). Alfred and Professor Abronisus sneak their way inside dressed as members of the undead. Count von Krolock appears at the top of the stairs to introduce his "guest", whom he forbids the other vampires to touch. Sarah enters the ballroom in an elegant red ballgown and approaches von Krolock. He is quick to embrace her with a bite, draining her blood. The Count then proceeds to dance with the weakened Sarah as the other vampires join them in a menuet. Alfred and the Professor plan to sneak Sarah out during the dance, but unfortunately for them, a mirror is unveiled, blowing their cover since they're the only ones reflected. Von Krolock commands his vampire flock to attack Alfred and his mentor, but the former manages to form a makeshift cross out of two candelabras, causing a diversion. The three humans make their escape as von Krolock, furious, sends Koukol chasing after the girl.

Koukol chases Alfred, Sarah and the Professor through the woods, but is attacked by wolves and killed. The three heroes stop on a small hillside to rest. Alfred once more professes his love to Sarah and the two lovers embrace (Draußen ist Freiheit –Reprise – "Outside is Freedom (Reprise)"). However, Sarah is already turned and bites Alfred mid-song, turning him into a vampire as well and both of them flee into the woods. Professor Abronsius, too consumed by his note-taking, does not see what is happening behind him until it is too late. In the epilogue, all vampires rejoice in their eternal dance (Der Tanz der Vampire – "Dance of the Vampires").

=== Broadway Version ===
==== Act 1 ====
Transylvania in 1880, three days before Halloween. Sarah, the pretty innkeeper's daughter, and her friends Nadja and Zsa-Zsa collect mushrooms in a dark forest. In a clearing where there is a ruined church, they take a break and Sarah, because it is already dawn and her companions are afraid, strikes up a prayer song.

The song is abruptly interrupted when suddenly a horde of vampires breaks out of the forest, kidnaps Nadja and Zsa-Zsa and performs a wild, at first hectic, but then increasingly passionate and conjuring dance. At the ecstatic climax of the round, a huge sarcophagus decorated with iron chains suddenly shoots out of the forest floor. From this emerges the charismatic Count Giovanni von Krolock, who introduces himself to Sarah in an extremely charming way and, on the occasion of her upcoming eighteenth birthday, invites her with flattering words to his annual big midnight ball. With the promise to come back, he bites her neck briefly and gives her a bath sponge.

In the only inn in the village of Lower Belabartockowich, the villagers gather around the innkeeper Chagal, his wife Rebecca and the buxom maid Magda to celebrate the 666th Garlic Festival. In the middle of the hustle and bustle, the first two strangers in twenty years burst: the international vampirologist Professor Abronsius from Heidelberg and his faithful factotum Alfred. Just as the professor inquires about a castle in the area, a woman notices the sunset, whereupon the other villagers flee in panic to their dwellings. As if to confirm Abronsius' suspicions, the sinister Madame von Krolock enters the inn to buy red silk for a ball gown. During the short conversation between the Countess and Chagal, Abronsius overhears that Sarah recently came back from the forest very late and has been behaving very strangely ever since. After a brief flirtation with the professor, she disappears and he himself reveals the reason for his presence: the destruction of the last master vampire, Count Giovanni von Krolock. He also demands to see Sarah.

Alfred, who has already gone ahead, bursts into Sarah's room as she is lying naked in the bathtub and falls in love with her on the spot. The professor points out the bite marks on her neck to the bewildered bystanders and immediately prepares a blood transfusion. After this has been successfully carried out, Abronsius hands out various tools against vampires such as garlic, wolfroot, black-orange crepe paper and a jack-o-lantern to Sarah's parents. He hands Chagal's whimsical waiter Boris, who has meanwhile fallen under von Krolock's influence, a bag full of silver nails with which the window is to be sealed.

While everyone goes about their tasks, Alfred stays with the awakening Sarah. Both get along splendidly right away, but before the burgeoning romance can solidify, Chagal comes in and sends the young student out. Just as he is about to nail boards in front of the window, someone with superhuman strength tears it out into the darkness. Count von Krolock appears and invites Sarah to the ball in his castle again for her eighteenth birthday, which is exactly midnight on Halloween, and promises her a red silk dress and red velvet boots as a gift.

The next day, some lumberjacks burst into the middle of one of Abronsius' fiery anti-vampire speeches and bring Chagal's frozen corpse with them. The professor immediately attests death by vampirism. Again, a villager notices the sunset, whereupon everyone heads over heels to safety. While Abronsius and Alfred go into the house to get the hammer and stake, Rebecca and Magda stay behind with the dead man, who, having become a vampire, promptly wakes up and, howling like a wolf, rams on Magda's leg before disappearing into the forest, hooting and laughing. Abronsius immediately takes up the chase, while Alfred is supposed to watch out for Sarah. She is just thinking about whether she should really go to the castle or not when Madame von Krolock appears and brings her the promised red velvet boots with best regards from the Count.

Just as Sarah is about to run away, Alfred comes out to her and confesses his love for her. Torn, Sarah sends him back into the house under a pretext and runs away, wearing her new red boots and already dreaming of the ball, in the direction of Krolock Castle. When Abronsius returns from an unsuccessful hunt, he is able to encourage the villagers to show him and Alfred the way to the castle, where the Count already welcomes Sarah with sweet declarations of love and leads them inside the eerie building.

==== Act 2 ====
Sarah wanders restlessly through the massive castle until she meets Count von Krolock in the great hall. They get incredibly close to each other, but he turns away at the last second and saves the longed-for "real bite" for the midnight ball.

In the meantime, Abronsius and Alfred have succeeded in penetrating the walls. In the library, where every book ever written is kept, they come across the Count, who pretends to be an admirer of the professor and makes some ambiguous jokes with Alfred, who doesn't want to be warmed up to a phallus-shaped bath sponge. He is also more frightened than enraptured by the flirting attempts of Herbert, the Count's homosexual son.

Later, in the pompous guest room that has been assigned to the two, Alfred is plagued by terrible nightmares in which he finally loses Sarah, after a bitter fight to the Count and his bloodsucking hordes.

Abronsius and Alfred use the last hours of the almost completely sleepy day to search for the crypt. After endless wandering, they discover the dark vault, but instead of Krolock, Chagal lies in the count's sarcophagus. But before they can finish him off, Rebecca and Magda burst in. As a wife, Rebecca insists on driving the stake into his heart herself. Alfred, closely followed by Abronsius, takes the opportunity to look for Sarah, whose voice he thinks he has heard. In the meantime, however, Chagal has woken up and sucked Rebecca and Magda dry and turned them into vampires as well, before he deals with them, a don't-disturb!sign.

Alfred has followed the voice and promptly lands in Herbert's room, who is absolutely ecstatic and already has wine goblets and handcuffs ready. The young student knows no other way to protect himself from the advances of the love-mad vampire than to shove a tome between his teeth just as he is about to bite.

In the end, Alfred finds Sarah after all. But she refuses to go, because she is already intoxicated by the thought of being the center of general attention at the ball - and especially that of the Count. The professor shows up and calls him outside, where he has made a horrific discovery. One by one, the vampires rise from the graves in the castle cemetery and, stretching their stiff limbs, stagger away in the direction of the ballroom. Abronsius is still shaken and lets Alfred in on the secret of an old prophecy: "If a virgin voluntarily allows herself to be bitten by a vampire on her eighteenth birthday, which occurs at midnight on Halloween in the year 1880, they would henceforth be able to walk around by day and achieve world domination." The Count appears in person to eliminate the unwelcome guests, but can be pushed back with the help of a crucifix. After the professor implores him to spare Sarah, Count von Krolock walks through the cemetery, lost in melancholy, remembering the numerous victims of his "insatiable hunger".

At the ball, Abronsius and Alfred mingle in disguise with the guests dancing a minuet. At the climax of the evening, the Count appears and presents Sarah, whom he bites into the voluntarily offered neck after he has handed out a few autographs. Alfred and the professor now storm forward and push back the bloodsuckers with a cross improvised from two candles. Von Krolock manages to grab Alfred and push him into the drooling pack, but Abronsius uses this moment of distraction to smash the window at the top of the grand staircase. In the rays of the sun, which has risen in the meantime, Count von Krolock dissolves into smoke with mad laughter.

The two vampire hunters have managed to escape together with Sarah. However, she is very weak and needs a blood transfusion as soon as possible. While the professor runs to the inn to get his transfusion machine, the young couple sinks into each other's arms. But Alfred's relief turns to horror when Sarah suddenly throws her arms around his neck and bites him.

One hundred years later on New York's Broadway. A group of vampires, including Chagal, Rebecca, Magda, Herbert and Sarah's friends Nadja and Zsa-Zsa, dance across the brightly lit Times Square between advertising posters for Webber's musical Bats and the music group "The Rolling Bones". The vampires have achieved their goal and rule the world.

== Productions and casts ==
=== Austria ===
Tanz der Vampire originally played from October 4, 1997, to January 15, 2000, at the Raimund Theater in Vienna, Austria. Steve Barton received the 1998 IMAGE Award for Best Actor for his originating performance as Count von Krolock. A complete cast recording and a highlights cast recording of the Vienna production was released on a double CD in 1998. For the 10th anniversary of the musical, Tanz der Vampire returned to the Raimund Theater for the week of February 3–11, 2007 in a scaled-down concert version.

From September 16, 2009, to June 25, 2011, Tanz der Vampire returned to Vienna at the Ronacher. The Ronacher production does not replicate the original. It features new sets, costumes, and lighting. Sets and costumes for the 2009 production were developed by Kentaur, based on the designs he developed previously for the Budapest production (see below).

=== Austria casts ===
Role	1997	2009	2017
Graf von Krolock	Steve Barton	Thomas Borchert	Drew Sarich
Sarah	Cornelia Zenz	Marjan Shaki	Diana Schnierer
Professor Abronsius	Gernot Kranner	Gernot Kranner	Sebastian Brandmeir
Alfred	Aris Sas	Lukas Perman	Raphael Groß
Chagal	James Sbano	James Sbano	Nicolas Tenerani
Rebecca	Anne Welte	Katharina Dorian	Dawn Bullock
Magda	Eva Maria Marold	Anna Thorén	Marle Martens
Herbert	Nik Breidenbach	Marc Liebisch	Charles Kreische
Koukol	Torsten Flach	Thomas Weissengruber	Florian Resetarits

=== Germany ===
The show had its German premiere in Stuttgart, Germany at the Apollo Theater and ran from March 31, 2000, to August 31, 2003. It also played in Hamburg at the Neue Flora Theater from December 7, 2003, to January 22, 2006, in Berlin at the Theater des Westens from December 10, 2006, to March 30, 2008, and in Oberhausen at the Metronom Theater am Centro from November 7, 2008, to January 31, 2010. As a result of public voting, Tanz der Vampire returned to Stuttgart at the Palladium Theater from February 25, 2010, to October 16, 2011. The show returned to the Theater des Westens in Berlin from November 14, 2011, to August 25, 2013. On April 24, 2016, Tanz der Vampire began a touring production across Germany that concluded on March 17, 2019.

=== Germany casts ===
Role	Stuttgart (2000)	Hamburg (2003)	Berlin (2006)	Oberhausen (2008)	Stuttgart (2010)	Berlin (2011)	2016 Tour	Oberhausen (2019)	Stuttgart (2021)	Hamburg (2023)
Graf von Krolock	Kevin Tarte	Thomas Borchert	Thomas Borchert	Jan Ammann	Jan Ammann	Drew Sarich	Mark Seibert (B, S, K); Thomas Borchert (B, M, S); Mathias Edenborn (S, H); Jan Ammann (M, S, H); Kevin Tarte (H); David Arnsperger (K); Ivan Ozhogin (K); Filippo Strocchi (B); Jan Kříž (B)	Filippo Strocchi	Filippo Strocchi	Rob Fowler
Sarah	Barbara Köhler	Jessica Kessler	Lucy Scherer	Nele-Liis Vaiksoo	Lucy Scherer	Amélie Dobler	Veronica Appeddu (B, M, S); Maureen Mac Gillavry (H, K); Diana Schnierer (K, B)	Diana Schnierer	Diana Schnierer	Kristin Backes
Professor Abronsius	Werner Bauer	Werner Bauer	Veit Schäfermeier	Gernot Kranner	Christian Stadlhofer	Veit Schäfermeier	Victor Petersen (B, M, S, H, K)	Luc Steegers	Luc Steegers	Till Jochheim
Alfred	Aris Sas	Frederik Wickerts	Alexander Klaws	Krisha Dalke	Krisha Dalke	Michael Heller	Tom van der Ven (B, M, S, H, K); Raphael Groß (B)	Raphel Groß	Raphel Groß	Vincent Van Gorp
Chagal	James Sbano	Jerzy Jeszke	Ulrich Wiggers	Jerzy Jeszke	Jerzy Jeszke	Kai Hüsgen	Nicolas Tenerani (B, M, S); Jerzy Jeszke (H)	Nicolas Tenerani	Nicolas Tenerani	Oleg Krasovitskii
Rebecca	Anne Welte	Jan Merchant	Maike Katrin Merkel	Heike Schmitz	Martine de Jager	Barbara Raunegger	Yvonne Köstler (B, M, S, H, K); Dawn Bullock (B)	Marja Hennike	Dawn Bullock	Carina Nopp
Magda	Maaike Schuurmans	Anna Thorén	Katja Berg	Linda Konrad	Linda Konrad	Goele de Raedt	Merel Zeeman (B, M, S, H); Sara Jane Checchi (H, K, B)	Anja Backus	Anja Backus	Anja Backus
Herbert	Thomas Mülner	Norbert Kohler	Haldor Laegreid	Florian Fetterle	Florian Fetterle	Marc Liebisch	Milan van Waardenburg (B, M, S); Christian Funk (H, K, B)	Charles Kreische	Jakub Wocial	Jonas Steppe
Koukol	Torsten Flach	Stefan Büdenbender	Stefan Büdenbender	Stefan Büdenbender	Stefan Büdenbender	Stefan Büdenbender	Paolo Bianca (B, M, S, H, K); Arvid Johansson (B)	Lukas Löw	Lukas Löw	Alexander Ruttig

=== United States ===
Tanz der Vampire attracted the attention of English-speaking producers who sought to adapt it for audiences in English-speaking countries. Composer Jim Steinman, an experienced figure in New York's theatrical landscape, had previously collaborated with Joseph Papp of the New York Shakespeare Festival in the early 1970s and contributed to various musical works, including The Dream Engine, Neverland, The Confidence Man, and the lyrics for Andrew Lloyd Webber's Whistle Down the Wind. Initially, consideration was given to staging the production, retitled Dance of the Vampires, in London's West End. However, under the guidance of Steinman and his manager, David Sonenberg, the decision was made to bring the musical to Broadway for the 1998 season. Steinman undertook the task of translating and adapting the German libretto and lyrics, with Roman Polanski returning as director and Andrew Braunsberg, the original Viennese producer and Polanski's manager, serving as executive producer. Failed efforts to secure Polanski's return to the United States led to a postponement of the production's opening to Halloween 2000. By March 2000, the inability to resolve the issue prompted the search for a new director.

In October 2000, a tentative opening was scheduled for Fall 2001, with Steinman assuming the role of director despite lacking prior experience in stage direction. To address concerns about his inexperience, Steinman noted in interviews that he had significantly influenced the original Vienna production, often implementing ideas independently of Polanski. By early 2001, preparations advanced with a reading for potential producers and investors, announced through Steinman's fan website. John Caird was appointed co-director, and playwright David Ives was engaged to revise the libretto, shifting the tone toward comedy to align with the perceived preferences of Broadway audiences, moving away from the original Austrian production's style. Producers David Sonenberg, Elizabeth Williams, and Anita Waxman, the latter two known for their work on the successful revival of The Music Man, joined the production team.

The revised production, described by Steinman as a grand, Wagnerian musical infused with humor reminiscent of Mel Brooks and the gothic sensibilities of Anne Rice, aimed to appeal to audiences skeptical of traditional musicals. However, the reimagined script, blending bawdy humor with eroticism, received mixed feedback from potential investors, who admired the score but found the libretto in need of refinement. Creative tensions between Steinman and the producing team, compounded by the inability to secure sufficient investment for the planned fall 2001 opening, led to the dismissal of producers Williams and Waxman, with Sonenberg assuming primary producing responsibilities, a move perceived by some as consolidating Steinman's control over the project.

To bolster investor confidence, the production sought a prominent lead for the role of Count von Krolock. After exploring options such as David Bowie, John Travolta, Richard Gere, and Plácido Domingo, Michael Crawford, renowned for his portrayal of the title character in Andrew Lloyd Webber's The Phantom of the Opera, was cast. Crawford's involvement was secured after negotiations granting him creative control over his character and the right of first refusal for future productions in London and Los Angeles. Initial reports of a substantial salary were later moderated, with Crawford agreeing to a reduced weekly compensation of $30,000, and Steinman dismissing earlier figures as exaggerated. His casting was seen as a significant draw, though he insisted on reshaping the role of von Krolock to emphasize comedy, distancing it from comparisons to his prior role in The Phantom of the Opera. Crawford also contributed to costume designs and adopted a distinctive accent to facilitate his performance.

The production faced significant disruptions following the September 11 attacks, which caused logistical delays, including travel restrictions affecting key creative team members based in London, such as co-director Caird. Unable to meet the planned opening before the Tony Awards deadline, and with Sonenberg struggling to secure his portion of the investment, the production was postponed to October 24, 2002. Additional producers, including USA Ostar Theatricals, Bob Boyett, and Lawrence Horowitz, were brought on board, alongside set designer David Gallo, whose work aligned with Steinman's aesthetic vision. However, Steinman and Caird were replaced as directors by John Rando, known for Urinetown, with John Carrafa joining as choreographer. A cast was assembled around Crawford, including Mandy Gonzalez as Sarah, Max von Essen as Alfred, René Auberjonois as Professor Abronsius, Ron Orbach as Chagal, and Leah Hocking as Magda.

Despite the talented ensemble, rehearsals revealed an unsteady situation. Rando struggled to manage the large-scale production, and Carrafa's choreography lacked precision, contributing to low company morale. Crawford's insistence on comedic revisions and his resistance to feedback created further tensions, as did the absence of a cohesive creative vision, exacerbated by Rando's temporary withdrawal following his mother's death. Steinman's disengagement, followed by his dismissal by Sonenberg, and the subsequent removal of Sonenberg as producer, further destabilized the production. Previews began at the Minskoff Theatre on October 18, 2002, with a version heavily altered to emphasize camp humor, diverging significantly from the original Viennese production. Initial ticket sales were strong, driven by Crawford's reputation, but critical reception was mixed.

Efforts to refine the production during previews included cutting dialogue to expand the score, redesigning costumes, and incorporating a modernized ending suggested by original author Michael Kunze. However, ongoing changes to the script and Crawford's ad-libbing created inconsistencies, frustrating cast members. The production officially opened on December 9, 2002, after 61 previews, with music and lyrics credited to Steinman and the book credited to Steinman, Kunze, and Ives. Critical reviews were overwhelmingly negative, particularly targeting Crawford's performance and the incoherent production. Steinman publicly distanced himself from the final product, emphasizing his preference for the Viennese version and later describing the Broadway production as a failure on his blog.

Dance of the Vampires closed on January 25, 2003, after 56 performances, incurring losses estimated at $12 million, marking it as one of Broadway's most significant financial failures at the time.

=== Original Broadway cast ===
- Count Giovanni Von Krolock – Michael Crawford
- Sarah – Mandy Gonzalez
- Professor Abronsius – René Auberjonois
- Alfred – Max von Essen
- Chagal – Ron Orbach
- Magda – Leah Hocking
- Rebecca – Liz McCartney
- Herbert – Asa Somers
- Boris – Mark Price
- Zsa-Zsa – Erin Leigh Peck
- Nadja – E. Alyssa Claar

=== Other international productions ===
The musical has thus far been played at the following international venues:

- Estonia: Tallinn: 2000 at the Tallinna Linnahall
- Poland: Warsaw: October 8, 2005 – October 24, 2006 at the Roma Teatr Muzyczny
- Japan:
  - Tokyo: July 7 – August 27, 2006; July 5 – August 26, 2009; November 27 – December 24, 2011; November 3–30, 2015; all at the Imperial Theatre
  - Fukuoka: September 2–27, 2009 at the Hakata-za
  - Osaka: January 7–12, 2012; January 2–11, 2016; all at the Umeda Arts Theater
  - Nagoya: January 15–17, 2016 at Chunichi Theatre
- Hungary: Budapest: June 30, 2007; PS Produkció at the Magyar Theatre
- Belgium: Antwerp: September 9, 2010 – October 24, 2010 at the Stadsschouwburg
- Slovakia: Nitra: May 5–7, 2011 at the Altes Theater Nitra
- Russia:
  - Saint Petersburg: September 3, 2011 – July 31, 2014; August 22 – October 2, 2016; May 25, 2018 – July 21, 2019; all at the State Theater of Musical Comedy
  - Moscow: October 29, 2016 – July 1, 2017 at the MDM Theater
- Finland:
  - Seinäjoki: September 10, 2011 – March 24, 2012 at the Seinäjoki City Theatre
  - Helsinki: February 3, 2016 – 2016 at the Peacock Theater
- France: Paris: October 16, 2014 – June 28, 2015 at the Théâtre Mogador
- Czech Republic: Prague: February 12, 2017 – June 10, 2018 at the GoJa Music Hall
- Switzerland: St. Gallen: February 19, 2017 at the Theater St. Gallen
- Denmark: Copenhagen: January 23 – April 9, 2020 at the Det Ny Teater

=== Other casts ===
Warsaw 2005
Graf von Krolock	Łukasz Dziedzic
Sarah	Malwina Kusior
Professor Abronsius	Robert Rozmus
Alfred	Jakub Molęda
Chagal	Wojciech Paszkowski
Rebecca	Grażyna Strachota
Magda	Dominika Szymańska
Herbert	Jakub Wocial
Koukol	Jakub Szydłowski

Tokyo 2006
Graf von Krolock	Yūichirō Yamaguchi
Sarah	Chihiro Otsuka, Tamaki Kemmotsu
Professor Abronsius	Masachika Ichimura
Alfred	Yohei Izumi, Kenji Urai
Chagal	Masahiro Sato
Rebecca	Satomi Achiwa
Magda	Yuko Miyamoto
Herbert	Keigo Yoshino
Koukol	Hajime Komoda

Budapest 2007
Graf von Krolock	Egyházi Géza, Nagy Sándor, Feke Pál, Bot Gábor
Sarah	Andrádi Zsanett, Kovács Nikoletta, Nádorfi Krisztina, Török Anna, Simon Panna Boglárka, Réthy Zsazsa
Professor Abronsius	Jegercsik Csaba, Sándor Dávid, Illés Dániel
Alfred	Sánta László, Héger Tibor, Szemenyei János, Pásztor Ádám, Scheich Dávid
Chagal	Pavletits Béla, Bot Gábor
Rebecca	Dobos Judit, Urbanovits Krisztina, Kokas Piroska
Magda	Kecskés Tímea, Balogh Anna, Stróbel Dóra, Sári Éva
Herbert	Pirgel Dávid, Posta Victor, Kamarás Máté, Jenei Gábor, Szemenyei János
Koukol	Farkas Gábor Attila, Balog János, Umbráth László

Antwerp 2010
Graf von Krolock	Hans Peter Janssens
Sarah	Anne Van Opstal
Professor Abronsius	Sébastien De Smet
Alfred	Niels Jacobs
Chagal	Frank Hoelen
Rebecca	Lulu Aertgeerts
Magda	Goele De Raedt
Herbert	Michaël Zanders
Koukol	James Cooke

Finland 2011
Graf von Krolock	Jyri Lahtinen
Sarah	Raili Raitala
Professor Abronsius	Esa Ahonen
Alfred	Ville Salonen
Chagal	Heikki Vainionpää
Rebecca	Leena Rousti
Magda	Anne Vihelä
Herbert	Jouko Enkelnotko
Koukol	Antti Railio

Russia
Role	Saint Petersburg (2011)	Saint Petersburg (2016)	Moscow (2016)	Saint Petersburg (2018)
Graf von Krolock	Ivan Ozhogin, Rostislav Kolpakov, Aleksandr Sukhanov, Fyodor Osipov			
Sarah	Elena Gazaeva, Vera Sveshnikova, Elena Romanova, Elizaveta Belousova		Irina Vershkova, Elena Gazaeva	Aleksandra Kasparova, Elena Bahtiyarova, Vera Sveshnikova
Professor Abronsius	Andrey Matveyev		Andrey Birin	Andrey Matveyev
Alfred	Georgy Novitsky	Igor Krol	Alexander Kazmin	Ruslan Davidenko
Chagal	Konstantin Kitanin	Alexander Sukhanov		Oleg Krasovitsky
Rebecca	Manana Gogitidze			
Magda	Natalia Bogdanis, Anna Lukoyanova	Nataliya Dievskaya	Agata Vavilova	Nataliya Dievskaya
Herbert	Kirill Gordeev			
Koukol	Alexander Chubaty	Anton Moshechkov	Leonid Shadrin	Anton Moshechkov

France 2014
Graf von Krolock	Stéphane Métro
Sarah	Rafaëlle Cohen
Professor Abronsius	David Alexis
Alfred	Daniele Carta Mantiglia
Chagal	Pierre Samuel
Rebecca	Solange Milhaud
Magda	Moniek Boersma
Herbert	Sinan Bertrand
Koukol	Guillaume Geoffroy

St. Gallen 2017
Graf von Krolock	Thomas Borchert
Sarah	Mercedesz Csampai
Professor Abronsius	Sebastian Brandmeir
Alfred	Tobias Bieri
Chagal	Jerzy Jeszke
Rebecca	Anja Wessel
Magda	Sanne Mieloo
Herbert	Christian Funk
Koukol	Thomas Huber

Copenhagen 2020
Graf von Krolock	Peter Jorde
Sarah	Monica Isa Andersen
Professor Abronsius	Kim Himmelsvang
Alfred	Søren Torpegaard Lund
Chagal	Jesper Asholt
Rebecca	Charlotte Guldberg
Magda	Julie Steincke
Herbert	Anders Bilberg
Koukol	Henrik Lund

== Characters ==
(Note: Many changes in characterization were made for the Broadway version. This refers to the original European version.)

- Graf von Krolock, the powerful and seductive vampire lord.
- Professor Abronsius, an absent-minded vampire hunter.
- Alfred, Abronsius' young and well-meaning assistant.
- Sarah, the innkeeper's beautiful young daughter.
- Chagal, a Jewish innkeeper and Sarah's over-protective father.
- Rebecca, Chagal's long-suffering wife.
- Magda, the pretty maid-of-all trades at Chagal's inn.
- Herbert von Krolock, the Count's homosexual son.
- Koukol, the Count's hunchbacked servant.

== Songs ==
The musical score written by Steinman leans heavily on material from his earlier projects, mainly from his less-known shows like The Dream Engine and The Confidence Man (co-written with Ray Errol Fox), although it also features music from his widely known records like "Total Eclipse of the Heart" (remade as "Totale Finsternis"), the melody, but not the lyric, from a Bat Out of Hell II song called "Objects in the Rear View Mirror May Appear Closer than They Are" (remade as "Die unstillbare Gier") and "Original Sin", originally written for the Pandora's Box album of the same name and later sung by Meat Loaf in Welcome to the Neighborhood (parts of which were remade as "Gott ist Tot" and "Einladung zum Ball"). The song "Tonight is What It Means to Be Young" from the soundtrack to the film Streets of Fire was also used (remade as Der Tanz der Vampire).

Asked at one point to explain the reuse of "Total Eclipse", Steinman explained, "That was an accident almost. I'm surprised it stayed in. [For the original production] in Vienna, I had only a month and a half to write this whole show and we needed a big love duet... But with Total Eclipse of the Heart, I was trying to come up with a love song and I remembered I actually wrote that to be a vampire love song. Its original title was Vampires in Love because I was working on a musical of Nosferatu, the other great vampire story. If anyone listens to the lyrics, they're really like vampire lines. It's all about the darkness, the power of darkness and love's place in dark. And so I figured 'Who's ever going to know; it's Vienna!' And then it was just hard to take it out."

Asked about the impact of previously heard songs, especially Total Eclipse, on the show's popularity in Europe, Steinman replied, "Well, the reaction, at least in Europe, was great. They recognized it, but then it seems – if it's done well – to take on a different personality."

=== Original Austrian version (1997) ===
This song list also reflects the Japanese production in 2006.

==== Act One ====
- "Ouverture" (Overture)
- "He, Ho, He" (Hey, Ho, Hey)
- "Knoblauch" (Garlic)
- "Bitte, meine Herren" (Please, Gentlemen)
- "Eine schöne Tochter ist ein Segen" (A Beautiful Daughter Is a Blessing)
- "Nie geseh'n" (Never Seen)
- "Gott ist tot" (God is Dead)
- "Alles ist hell" (Everything's Bright)
- "Wahrheit" (Truth)
- "Du bist wirklich sehr nett" (You're Really Very Nice)
- "Einladung zum Ball" (Invitation to the Ball)
- "Draußen ist Freiheit" (Outside Is Freedom)
- "Die roten Stiefel" (The Red Boots)
- "Trauer um Chagal" (Mourning for Chagal)
- "Tot zu sein ist komisch" (To Be Dead is Strange)
- "Durch die Wildnis zum Schloß" (Through the Wilderness to the Castle)
- "Vor dem Schloß" (In Front of the Castle)

==== Act Two ====
- "Totale Finsternis" (Total Eclipse)
- "Carpe noctem" (Seize the Night)
- "Ein perfekter Tag" (A Perfect Day)
- "In der Gruft" (In the Crypt)
- "Bücher, Bücher" (Books, Books)
- "Für Sarah" (For Sarah)
- "Noch mehr Bücher" (Even More Books)
- "Wenn Liebe in dir Ist" (When Love Is Inside You)
- "Sie irren, Professor" (You're Wrong, Professor)
- "Ewigkeit" (Eternity)
- "Die unstillbare Gier" (The Insatiable Greed)
- "Tanzsaal" (The Ballroom)
- "Draußen ist Freiheit – Reprise"
- "Der Tanz der Vampire" (The Dance of the Vampires)

=== Later European versions ===
While some song titles changed in later variations, aside from the addition of one number to replace Die roten Stiefel, the substance of the score is largely the same. (For example, the new title of Nie geseh'n merely reflects the first line of the song replacing its original title, not a new number being written. English translations of the new German phrases are provided as above, the exception being Wuscha Buscha, which is a nonsense phrase repeated in the peasant scenes in question.) The list below reflects changes made to all productions after the Stuttgart and Berlin runs. A few scenes have also been revised with shorter songs and less underscoring in order to pick up the pace of the show.

==== Act One ====
- "Ouverture"
- "He, Ho Professor"
- "Knoblauch"
- "Bitte, meine Herren!"
- "Eine schöne Tochter"
- "Ein Mädchen, das so lächeln kann" (A Girl Who Smiles in Such a Way)
- "Sei bereit (Gott ist tot)" (Be Prepared)
- "Alles ist hell"
- "Wahrheit"
- "Du bist wirklich sehr nett"
- "Einladung zum Ball"
- "Draußen ist Freiheit"
- "Stärker als wir sind" (Stronger Than We Are)
- "Wuscha Buscha"
- "Tot zu sein ist komisch"
- "Durch die Wildnis zum Schloß"
- "Vor dem Schloß"

==== Act Two ====
- "Liebesduett / Totale Finsternis" (Love Duet)
- "Carpe noctem"
- "Ein guter Tag" (A Good Day)
- "Für Sarah"
- "Die Gruft" (The Crypt)
- "Bücher"
- "Bücher – Reprise"
- "Wenn Liebe in dir Ist"
- "He Ho, Professor – Reprise"
- "Ewigkeit"
- "Die unstillbare Gier"
- "Tanzsaal"
- "Draußen ist Freiheit – Reprise"
- "Der Tanz der Vampire"

=== Original Broadway version (2002–03) ===
During previews, "The Invitation" consisted of sections "A Good Nightmare Comes So Rarely", "The Devil May Care (But I Don't)" and "Sometimes We Need the Boogeyman". Also, "Something to Kill (Our Time)" was performed between "For Sarah" and "Death Is Such an Odd Thing (Reprise)".

==== Act One ====
- "Overture"
- "Angels Arise" – Sarah, Nadja, Zsa Zsa
- "God Has Left the Building" – Vampires and Sarah, Nadja, Zsa Zsa
- "Original Sin" – Count von Krolock, Sarah, Vampires
- "Garlic" – Chagal, Rebecca, Magda, Boris and the Peasants
- "Logic" – Abronsius, with Alfred, Chagal, Magda, and Rebecca
- "There's Never Been a Night Like This" – Alfred, Sarah, Chagal, Rebecca, Magda and Abronsius
- "Don't Leave Daddy" – Chagal
- "The Invitation" – Instrumental
  - "A Good Nightmare Comes So Rarely" – Krolock
  - "Forevermore in the Night" – Instrumental
- "Death Is Such an Odd Thing" – Rebecca, Magda
- "Braver Than We Are" – Sarah, Alfred
- "Red Boots Ballet" – Sarah, Company, Krolock
- "Say a Prayer" – Company
- "Come with Me" – Krolock

==== Act Two ====
- "Vampires in Love (Total Eclipse of the Heart)" – Sarah, Krolock, Vampires
- "Books, Books" – Abronsius, Krolock
- "Carpe Noctem" – Company
- "For Sarah" – Alfred
- "Death Is Such an Odd Thing (Reprise)" – Rebecca, Magda, Chagal
- "When Love Is Inside You" – Alfred, Herbert
- "Eternity" – Vampires
- "Confession of a Vampire" – Krolock
- The Ball:
  - "The Minuet" – Abronsius, Alfred, Herbert, Boris, and Vampires
  - "Never Be Enough" – Krolock and Vampires
  - "Come with Me (Reprise)" – Krolock
- "Braver Than We Are (Reprise)" – Sarah, Alfred
- "The Dance of the Vampires" – Company

== See also ==
- Vereinigte Bühnen Wien (Vienna & St. Petersburg Production Company)
- Stage Entertainment (German & Moscow Production Company)
- Vampires Rock (A UK musical based on Tanz der Vampire.)
