= The Count of Monte Cristo (Wildhorn musical) =

2009 Frank Wildhorn Musical

- Concept album cover
- Music: Frank Wildhorn
- Lyrics: Jack Murphy
- Book: Jack Murphy
- Basis: The Count of Monte Cristo by Alexandre Dumas
- Productions: 2009 St. Gallen; 2010 Seoul; 2011 Seoul; 2012 Leipzig; 2013 Tecklenburg; 2013 Seoul; 2013 Tokyo; 2014 Kaunas, Lithuania; 2014 Röttingen, Germany; 2015 BYU, Utah, US; 2016 Salt Lake City; 2016 Seoul; 2017 Saint Petersburg; 2019 Moscow; 2019 Bremerhaven; 2020 Seoul; 2021 Ivins, Utah; 2023 Lüneburg; 2023~2024 Seoul (All New Korean Production); 2026 Münster; 2026 Plauen

The Count of Monte Cristo is a musical based on the famed 1844 novel of the same name by Alexandre Dumas, with influences from the 2002 film adaptation of the book. The music is written by Frank Wildhorn and the lyrics and book are by Jack Murphy.

== Development ==
The musical had a New York City workshop in November 2008, starring Brandi Burkhardt, James Barbour, Natalie Toro, Gregg Edelmann and several others from the Broadway production of A Tale of Two Cities, and many known Wildhorn favorites. After the workshop, concept recording was released on December 12, 2008. It starred several European theatrical superstars and the recording went platinum.

The show premiered (in German as Der Graf von Monte Christo) on March 14, 2009, in the Theater St. Gallen, St. Gallen, Switzerland. The production was directed by Andreas Gergen, with Thomas Borchert starring as The Count. The role of Mercédès was played by Sophie Berner.

On April 21, 2010, the first licensed international production of the show premiered in Universal Arts Center, Seoul, Korea, directed by Robert Johanson, and closed on June 13. The production later returned in 2011 and 2013, with minor changes in the plot and songs.

The English-language U.S. premiere was performed at Brigham Young University in Provo, Utah, United States. The show ran from January 22–31, 2015. Frank Wildhorn had visited BYU to perform and teach master classes to students, and was so impressed with the level of talent shown that he asked if BYU would like to present the US premiere of the musical.

The American professional premiere was produced by Pioneer Theatre Company in Salt Lake City, in May 2016, under the direction of Marcia Milgrom Dodge.

== Summary ==
As described on the official website:

"Falsely accused of colluding with the exiled Napoleon Bonaparte in 19th century France, newlywed seaman Edmond Dantès suddenly finds himself thrown into a Mediterranean island prison without a trial. Money in hand, Dantès transforms himself into the powerful and mysterious Count of Monte Cristo and embarks upon a quest to avenge those who stole the heart of his beloved bride, Mercedes, and conspired to destroy him."

== Plot ==
=== Prologue ===
Edmond Dantès, a young, naïve second mate of a French trading ship, for the Morrell Shipping Company, lands the ship on the island of Elba to seek medical attention for his dying captain. While on the island, the exiled French Emperor Napoleon Bonaparte gives Dantès a letter to deliver to an associate in Dantès' home of Marseille ("Prologue - Let Justice Be Done").

=== Act I ===
Dantès returns home and is warmly welcomed by his fiancée, Mercédès, and his close friend Fernand Mondego. When shipowner Morrell inquires about the fate of the vessel’s captain, Danglars, the ship’s first mate, reports that the captain has died and accuses Dantès of disobeying orders by transporting the body to Elba. Rather than reprimanding him, Morrell praises Dantès for his judgment and promotes him to captain. Enraged by this turn of events, Danglars begins plotting revenge. With Dantès’ promotion removing the final obstacle to marriage, he and Mercédès joyfully celebrate their impending union (“When Love Is True”).

Unbeknownst to Dantès, Mondego harbors deep feelings for Mercédès and secretly resents Dantès for winning her hand. Aware that Dantès is carrying a letter from Napoleon—an act that could be construed as treason—Danglars persuades Mondego to join him in a conspiracy to destroy Dantès.

At his home, Dantès celebrates both his promotion and engagement with family and friends (“Raise a Glass”). The festivities are abruptly halted when Gendarmes arrive and arrest him on charges of Bonapartist sympathies. Though his friends protest, Dantès submits willingly, confident that the arrest is a misunderstanding and that he will soon be released. Before departing, he entrusts Mercédès’ care to Mondego until his return.

Dantès is brought before Gérard de Villefort, the chief magistrate. After extensive questioning, Villefort becomes convinced of Dantès’ innocence and prepares to release him. However, before doing so, he asks for the identity of the intended recipient of Napoleon’s letter. Dantès unknowingly reveals that the recipient is Villefort’s own father. Alarmed by the threat this poses to his career and reputation, Villefort reverses his decision and condemns Dantès to life imprisonment at the island fortress of the Château d’If.

Danglars and Mondego reveal themselves to Villefort as the orchestrators of Dantès’ arrest. The three men justify their actions by invoking a ruthless view of human nature, arguing that survival belongs to the strong and that their betrayal was necessary to achieve their desires. (“A Story Told”).

Dantès is branded and confined to his cell. Meanwhile, Mercédès prays fervently for his safe return. Despite their separation, both vow eternal devotion to one another (“I Will Be There”).

Years pass, and Dantès languishes in prison, gradually losing hope. In Marseille, Mondego continues to court Mercédès, but she remains steadfast, consumed by anguish and desperate for news of her imprisoned fiancé. Realizing she will never abandon Dantès while she believes him alive, Mondego falsely tells her that Dantès has died in an accident (“Every Day a Little Death”).

One night, Dantès is awakened by mysterious sounds as an elderly man breaks through the wall of his cell. The man introduces himself as Abbé Faria, who explains that he has been tunneling toward freedom but mistakenly emerged into Dantès’ cell. Faria asks for Dantès’ assistance in correcting the tunnel’s course and, in exchange, offers him an education. Being illiterate, Dantès eagerly agrees. Over time, Faria instructs him in mathematics, philosophy, military strategy, literature, economics, and combat. The two develop a deep friendship, sharing the stories of their lives. Faria reveals that he once served the wealthy Count Chésele Spada, who entrusted him with the secret location of a vast fortune hidden on the island of Monte Cristo. He promises to share the treasure with Dantès in return for his help (“Lessons Learned”).

Tragedy strikes when the tunnel collapses, mortally wounding Faria. As he dies in Dantès’ arms, Faria bequeaths the entire treasure to him. The two share a final dream of freedom and wealth, knowing it will never be realized together. Faria urges Dantès to forgive and forget, but Dantès admits that his heart is set on vengeance (“When We Are Kings”).

After Faria’s death, prison guards place his body in a sack. While they leave to retrieve a cart, Dantès switches places with the corpse. Unaware of the deception, the guards cast the sack into the sea.

Dantès survives and is rescued by a pirate ship commanded by the smuggler Luisa Vampa. To test him, Vampa forces Dantès to fight Jacopo, a member of the crew, in a knife duel. Drawing upon Faria’s training, Dantès defeats Jacopo but spares his life. Impressed, Vampa allows both men to live, and Jacopo pledges lifelong loyalty to Dantès. At Dantès’ request, the pirates set him and Jacopo ashore on the island of Monte Cristo (“Pirates – Truth or Dare”).

On the island, Dantès discovers Spada’s hidden treasure and reinvents himself as the wealthy and enigmatic Count of Monte Cristo (“The Treasure / When We Are Kings – Reprise”).

Years later, Mercédès is trapped in a loveless marriage to Mondego, and they have a son, Albert, who has just turned eighteen. Albert asks his mother for permission to attend Carnival in Rome, but she refuses, believing him too young to travel without supervision. Indifferent to his son’s welfare, Mondego readily grants permission. Left alone, Mercédès reflects sorrowfully on the life she once imagined (“When the World Was Mine”).

Meanwhile, Dantès travels through Italy as the Count of Monte Cristo, surrounded by luxury and adoration, yet unable to find pleasure in it (“Dance the Tarantella”). Jacopo returns from an investigation into the fates of Dantès’ betrayers. He reports that Danglars has risen to the rank of Baron after acquiring Morrell’s company, and that Villefort has become chief prosecutor in Paris. Hesitant to speak of Mercédès and Mondego, Jacopo ultimately reveals their marriage and the existence of their son. Overcome with fury, Dantès vows a relentless revenge against all who betrayed him—including Mercédès, whom he believes has broken her vow of eternal fidelity (“Hell to Your Doorstep”).

=== Act II ===
Albert celebrates Carnival in Rome with his friends (“Carnival in Rome / Tarantella – Reprise”). He is lured away from the festivities by a beautiful young woman and subsequently captured by bandits. Dantès is also present, posing as a fellow captive. When Albert explains that his capture was prompted by a woman, the two men reflect on the power women hold over men (“Ah, Women”). Albert reveals that he is in love with, and engaged to, Valentine Villefort, the daughter of the chief prosecutor.

When the bandits return, Dantès breaks free from his bonds and fights them while Albert hides. The bandits are revealed to be Luisa Vampa and her band of pirates, now secretly working for Dantès. The entire episode proves to be part of Dantès’s scheme to befriend Albert and gain access to his father, Mondego. After paying the pirates for their services, Dantès allows them to depart. Grateful for his rescue, Albert asks his savior’s name. Dantès introduces himself as the Count of Monte Cristo and invites Albert and his parents to attend a grand ball at the lavish Parisian mansion he has recently acquired.

At the ball, attended by the elite of French society, guests gossip about their enigmatic host (“That’s What They Say”). Dantès arrives and captivates the attendees with his charisma and seemingly endless wealth. Jacopo formally presents Baron and Baroness Danglars, who immediately seek financial dealings with the Count, followed by Chief Prosecutor Villefort and his wife. Albert then introduces his fiancée Valentine and his father, Mondego. None of the men recognize the Count as Edmond Dantès. However, when Mondego introduces his wife Mercédès, she instantly recognizes her former lover. Overcome with shock, she attempts to speak to him, but Dantès deliberately avoids her throughout the evening, making it clear that there is nothing left between them (“I Know Those Eyes / This Man Is Dead”).

Dantès proceeds to entrap Danglars, Villefort, and Mondego by having Jacopo persuade them to invest their fortunes in a company called "Llerrom International"—secretly owned by Dantès himself. The scheme initially proves lucrative, and each man harbors selfish ambitions: Danglars schemes to become the richest man in Paris, Villefort plans to bribe voters in future political campaigns, and Mondego dreams of a life of excess. Once they are fully exposed, Dantès liquidates the company, resulting in their financial ruin and public disgrace. Danglars commits suicide, Villefort is imprisoned, and Mondego, the last remaining conspirator, realizes the truth when he notices that “Llerrom” is “Morrell” spelled backward—recalling Dantès’s former employment with the Morrell Shipping Company and deducing the Count’s true identity (“The Trap / Too Much Is Never Enough”).

When the scandal becomes public, Albert believes his family’s honor has been destroyed and challenges the Count to a duel. Mercédès pleads with her son to reconsider, but Albert refuses. Meanwhile, Valentine reflects privately on her father, whom she once believed to be virtuous, only to discover the corruption beneath his flawless exterior. She resolves to reject false appearances and confront the world honestly, in both its beauty and its cruelty (“Pretty Lies”).

Mercédès visits the Count and begs him to spare Albert’s life, revealing that she knows his true identity. Dantès, still unable to forgive her for marrying Mondego, refuses, declaring that “pity is for the weak.” Mercédès laments her wasted life, blaming herself for relinquishing hope and believing Mondego’s lie, even as she clung to the dream that they might one day reunite under the guiding star of their love (“All This Time”).

The duel between Dantès and Albert takes place, with both men drawing pistols. Albert misses his shot, leaving Dantès with the opportunity to kill him. As Dantès prepares to do so, Valentine intervenes, declaring her love for Albert and pleading for his life. Although she is pulled away, Dantès ultimately fires his pistol into the air, sparing Albert. The duel ends, and the young couple flee together.

Moved by Valentine’s devotion, Dantès begins to rediscover his former self and relinquishes the hatred and suffering that have defined him (“The Man I Used to Be”).

Dantès later reunites with Mercédès at his mansion and forgives her upon learning the truth—that she married Mondego only after being deceived into believing Dantès had died in prison. Mondego suddenly appears, demanding Mercédès’s return and engaging Dantès in a violent sword fight. Dantès gains the upper hand but cannot bring himself to kill his enemy and instead sets him free. Mondego, however, refuses to relent and attacks again. Acting in self-defense, Dantès fatally wounds him, bringing their conflict to an end (“Hell to Your Doorstep – Reprise”).

In the aftermath, Dantès questions whether he deserves peace after the suffering caused by his revenge and the innocent lives harmed along the way. Mercédès comforts him, and through her compassion and love, Dantès is finally freed from the pain of his past. Reunited, the two lovers embrace and vow never to part again (“Finale: I Will Be There – Reprise”).

== Song list ==
=== Musical ===
Act I

- Prologue (Let Justice Be Done) - Ensemble
- When Love is True - Dantès and Mercédès
- Raise a Glass - Ensemble
- A Story Told - Mondego, Danglars, and Villefort
- I Will Be There - Dantès and Mercédès
- Everyday a Little Death - Dantès, Mercédès, and Mondego
- Lesson's Learned - Abbé Faria and Dantès
- When We are Kings - Abbé Faria and Dantès
- Pirates (Truth or Dare) - Luisa Vampa, Pirates, and Dantès
- The Treasure (When We are Kings [Reprise]) - Dantès
- When the World Was Mine - Mercédès
- Dance The Tarantella - Courtesans
- Hell to Your Doorstep - Dantès

Act II

- Carnival In Rome / Tarantella (Reprise) - Ensemble
- Ah, Women - Dantès/Monte Cristo and Albert
- That's What They Say - Ensemble
- I Know Those Eyes / This Man is Dead - Dantès/Monte Cristo and Mercédès
- The Trap / Too Much Is Never Enough - Dantès/Monte Cristo, Mondego, Danglars, Villefort
- Pretty Lies - Valentine de Villefort
- All This Time - Mercédès
- The Man I Used to Be - Dantès/Monte Cristo
- Hell To Your Doorstep (Reprise) - Mondego and Dantès
- Finale: I Will Be There (Reprise) - Dantès and Mercédès

=== Highlights from the Musical concept album ===
Except for the prologue, which is sung in Latin, all songs are performed in English.

- Prologue (Let Justice Be Done) - Ensemble
- When Love is True - Thomas Borchert and Brandi Burkhardt
- A Story Told - Patrick Stanke, Mathias Edenborn, and Mark Seibert
- I Will Be There - Borchert and Burkhardt
- Everyday a Little Death - Borchert, Burkhardt, and Stanke (Note: Stanke/Mondego is uncredited on the album.)
- When We are Kings - Borchert and Alexander Goebel
- When the World Was Mine - Burkhardt
- Hell to Your Doorstep - Borchert
- Ah, Women - Borchert and Jesper Tydén
- I Know Those Eyes / This Man is Dead - Borchert and Burkhardt
- Pretty Lies - Pia Douwes
- All This Time - Burkhardt
- The Man I Used to Be - Borchert

== Characters and casts ==
| Character | Original Concept Recording | Original St. Gallen Cast | Original Korean Cast | Original American Cast (Collegiate) | Original American Cast (Professional) | Original Russian Cast (2017-2024) |
|---|---|---|---|---|---|---|
| Dantès/The Count | Thomas Borchert | Thomas Borchert | Ryu Jung-han; Um Ki-joon; Shin Sung-rok | Preston Yates | Matt Farcher | Rostislav Kolpakov Kirill Gordeev Yevgeny Shirikov |
| Mercédès | Brandi Burkhardt | Sophie Berner | Ock Joo-hyun; Cha Ji-yeon | Shae Hunsaker Robins | Briana Carlson-Goodman | Vera Sveshnikova Elena Gazaeva Anastasiya Vishnevskaya |
| Mondego | Patrick Stanke | Carsten Lepper | Choi Min-chul; Cho Hui | Taylor Morris | Darren Ritchie | Fyodor Osipov Oleg Krasovitskyi Aleksandr Sukhanov |
| Danglars | Mathias Edenborn | Karim Khawatmi | Jang Dae-woong | Cameron Smith | Brandon Contreras | Grigori Zakhariev Konstantin Kitanin |
| Villefort | Mark Seibert | Christoph Goetten | Cho Sun-chang | Matt Krantz | John Schiappa | Sergey Braga Vladimir Sadkov |
| Faria | Alexander Goebel | Dean Welterlen | Cho Won-hee; Lee Yong-geun | Brian Clark | Dathan B. Williams | Andrey Matveev Ivan Korytov |
| Luisa Vampa | None† | Ava Brennan | Han Ji-yeon | Lauren Kelsey Hughes | Aubin Wise | Agata Vavilova Nataliya Dievskaya |
| Albert | Jesper Tydén | Daniel Berini | Kim Seung-dae; Jeon Dong-seok | Cayel Tregeagle | Paul Louis Lessard | Igor Krol Aleksey Baikov |

† Songs featuring Luisa Vampa are absent from the concept album.

=== Recordings ===
- 2008 Original Concept Cast Recording (Highlights)
- 2009 Original St. Gallen Cast Recording (Highlights)
- 2010 Original Korean Cast Recording (Highlights with Alternate Cast versions on "I Will Be There" and "Hell To Your Doorstep")
- In November 2017, the musical was brought to St. Petersburg's Musical Comedy Theatre in Russia, getting a brand new premiere: from the original German performance, some plot choices were changed and variations added. For the occasion, the Russian version was gifted of new compositions by Frank Wildhorn himself, by also showing a reprise of "Every day a little death" (sung by Albert, Mercédès and Valentine while the two of them are trying to convince the boy in renouncing to challenge Monte-Cristo) and of "That's what they say", placed later the events of their duel, after the news of Mondego, Danglars and Villefort's downfall breaks among Paris’ upper class .
