= Thomas Borchert =

German actor, singer, and songwriter

- Born: 20 July 1966 (age 59); Essen, West Germany
- Occupation: Stage actor

Thomas Borchert (born 20 July 1966 in Essen, Germany) is a German actor, singer, and songwriter. He has performed in musical theatre.

== Biography ==
In 1988, Borchert, with his rock band "Cakewalk", won a prize in a music festival sponsored by the German broadcasting network NDR. He finished high school that same year, then went to the Stage School of Music, Dance and Drama in Hamburg. His first professional role was as Rum Tum Tugger in the Andrew Lloyd Webber musical Cats, in 1990-1991. Recently, he appeared as Maxim de Winter in a Stuttgart production of the musical Rebecca.

The musical The Count of Monte Cristo, in which Thomas plays the title role, was written especially for him by composer Frank Wildhorn in 2009. He was voted "Best Actor in a Musical 2014/15" by the readers of the German Magazine "Musicals". As a singer and pianist, he has recorded several CDs and has often discussed with concerts in Germany, Austria and Switzerland.

Borchert married the violinist Rebecca Thümer in 2005 in Hamburg. He has a son Jonas from his first marriage. He has been married to the musical performer and actress Navina Heyne since the summer of 2018.

== Career ==
- 1990 - 1991: Cats - as Rum Tum Tugger
- 1991: You're a Good Man, Charlie Brown (Hamburg) - as Snoopy
- 1991: The Rocky Horror Show (Hamburg) - as Frank N. Furter
- 1992: Jesus Christ Superstar - as Judas
- 1993 - 1994: Elisabeth (Vienna) - as Luigi Lucheni
- 1994 - 1996: Buddy – The Buddy Holly Story (Hamburg) - as Buddy Holly
- 1996 - 1997: Evita (Schwäbisch Hall) - as Ché Guevara
- 1997 - 1998: Elisabeth (Vienna) - as Luigi Lucheni
- 1998 - 1999: Les Misérables (Duisburg) - as Jean Valjean
- 1999 - 2000: Mozart! (Vienna) as Leopold Mozart
- 2000 - 2001: Mozart! (Vienna) as Count Hieronymus von Colloredo
- 2001 + 2002: Judy - Somewhere over the Rainbow (Vienna) - all principal male roles
- 2001 - 2003: Jekyll & Hyde (Vienna) - as Henry Jekyll & Edward Hyde
- 2002: Divas (Vienna) - as Herb Hammerschmidt, King of Entertainment
- 2003: A Midsummer Night's Dream (Rosenburg) - as Oberon & Theseus
- 2003 - 2005: Dance of the Vampires (Hamburg) - as Graf von Krolock
- 2004: Elisabeth (Trieste operetta festival) - as Death
- 2005 - 2006: Dracula, the Musical (St. Gallen) - as Count Dracula
- 2005: The Phantom of the Opera (Essen) - as The Phantom
- 2006: Best of Musical (Tour) - as a soloist
- 2006 - 2008: Dance of the Vampires (Berlin) - as Graf von Krolock
- 2007: Best of Musical (Tour) - as a soloist
- 2007: Dracula, the Musical (Graz music festival) - as Count Dracula
- 2008: Novecento - Die Legende vom Ozeanpianisten (Hamburg) - als Novecento
- 2008: Gigi - Das Musical (London) - als Gaston
- 2008: Novecento - The Legend of the Red Pianist (Tour) - as Novecento
- 2009: The Count of Monte Cristo (St. Gallen) - as Edmond Dantès
- 2009 - 2011 Dance of the Vampires (Vienna) - as Graf von Krolock
- 2011: Rebecca (Stuttgart) - as Maxim de Winter
- 2012: Dance of the Vampires (Berlin) - as Graf von Krolock
- 2014: Artus-Excalibur (St. Gallen) - as Merlin
- 2018 - 2019: Dance of the Vampires (St-Petersburg) - as Graf von Krolock
- 2021 Dracula, the Musical (Ulm) - as Count Dracula
- 2022: Dance of the Vampires (St-Petersburg) - as Graf von Krolock
- 2022 Dracula, the Musical (München) - as Count Dracula
- 2023: Dance of the Vampires (Stuttgart) - as Graf von Krolock
- 2023 - 2024: The Count of Monte Cristo (Lüneburg) - as Edmond Dantès

== Discography (selected works) ==
- Jim Steinman: Tanz der Vampire. Markus Tüpker, Essen [2004]
- Deluxe. Markus Tüpker, Essen / Alive, Cologne (Vertrieb) [2004]
- Frank Wildhorn: Jekyll & Hyde (highlights). BMG Ariola, Munich [u. a.] [2002]
- Buddy. Sony Music Entertainment, Frankfurt am Main [1994]

== Awards ==
Borchert won the 2002 German Musical Award for best actor for his performance in the title roles of Jekyll & Hyde.
