= List of markets in Vienna =

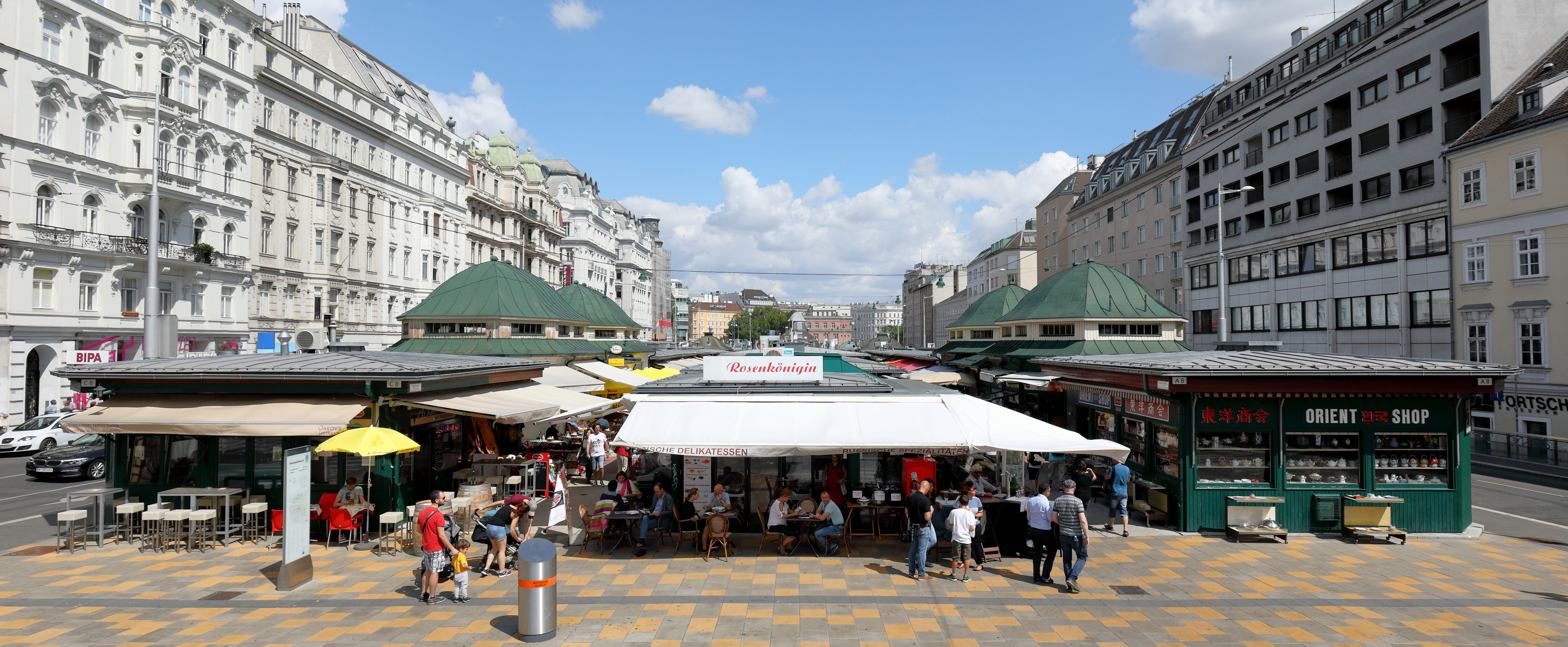
Naschmarkt

List of Markets in Vienna.

== 1st District (Innere Stadt) ==
Markt am Donaukanal

- Place: Zwischen Augartenbrücke and Aspernbrücke
- Opening hours: Mai til September Saturday 14-20 o'clock, Sunday 10-20 o'clock
- Accessibility: U4
- Kunstgewerbe, Kunstgegenstände, Antiquitäten, books

Antiquitätenmarkt Am Hof

- Place: Rund um die Mariensäule 48°12′39.95″N 16°22′2.81″E
- Opening hours 1.03. til Saturday vor 24.12: Friday and Saturday 10-20 o'clock Angebot: Kunstgegenstände and Antiquitäten
- Accessibility: 1A, 2A, 3A

Biobauern-Markt Freyung

- Place: Freyung 48°12′42.24″N 16°21′54.46″E
- Opening hours: Ganzjährig in allen ungeraden Kalenderwochen, Friday and Saturday 9-18 o'clock
- Accessibility: 1A Freyung. U2 Schottentor, U3 Herrengasse
- Lebensmittel aus kontrolliert biologischem Anbau

Temporärer Markt Freyung

- Place: Freyung 48°12′42.24″N 16°21′54.46″E
- Opening hours: May til November, Tuesday til Thursday 10-18.30 o'clock Angebot: Lebensmittel (mit Landparteien)
- Accessibility: 1A Freyung, U2 Schottentor, U3 Herrengasse

Former markets

- Bauernmarkt
- Fleischmarkt, Greek Quarter
- Getreidemarkt
- Am Haarmarkt (also Flachsmarkt, now Rotenturmstraße)
- Hoher Markt
- Am Kienmarkt (now Ruprechtsplatz)
- Kohlmarkt (formerly Witmarkt, Kohlenmarkt)
- Neuer Markt (formerly Mehlmarkt)
- Am Rossmarkt (now Renngasse)
- Salzgasse
- Schweinemarkt (now Lobkowitzplatz)
- Wildpretmarkt (formerly Neuer Kienmarkt)

== 2nd District (Leopoldstadt) ==
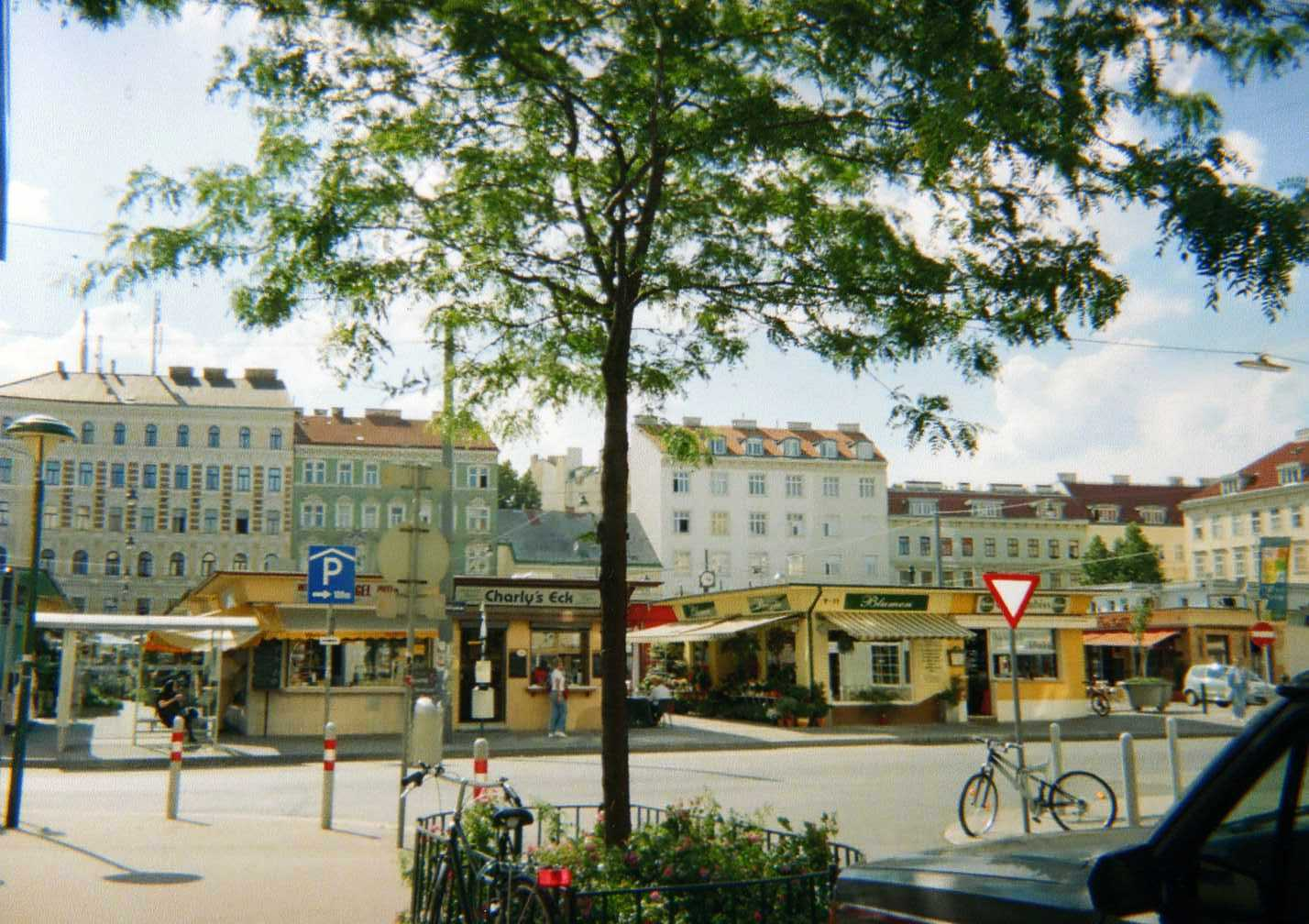
Karmelitermarkt

Karmelitermarkt

- Place: Im Werd, Krummbaumgasse, Leopoldsgasse, Haidgasse 48°13′2.56″N 16°22′35.56″E
- Opening hours: Monday til Friday 6-19.30 o'clock, Saturday 6-17 o'clock
- Gastronomy: Monday til Saturday/Shabbath 6 til 22 o'clock
- Accessibility: 5A, nearby Karmeliterplatz, and part of the Karmeliterviertel
- Bio-Eck jeden Saturday/Shabbath, market with farmhouse market

Vorgartenmarkt

- Place: Wohlmutstraße, Ennsgasse 48°13′17.99″N 16°24′5.64″E
- Opening hours: Monday til Friday 6-19.30 o'clock, Saturday 6-17 o'clock
- Gastronomy: Monday til Saturday 6 til 22 o'clock
- Accessibility: 82A
- market with farmhouse market

Volkertmarkt

- Place: Volkertplatz 48°13′22.78″N 16°23′8.83″E
- Opening hours: Monday til Friday 6-19.30 o'clock, Saturday 6-17 o'clock
- Gastronomy: Monday til Saturday 6 til 22 o'clock
- Accessibility: 80A
- market with farmhouse market

Former markets

- Tandelmarkt (now Tandelmarktgasse), Jewish street

== 3rd District ==
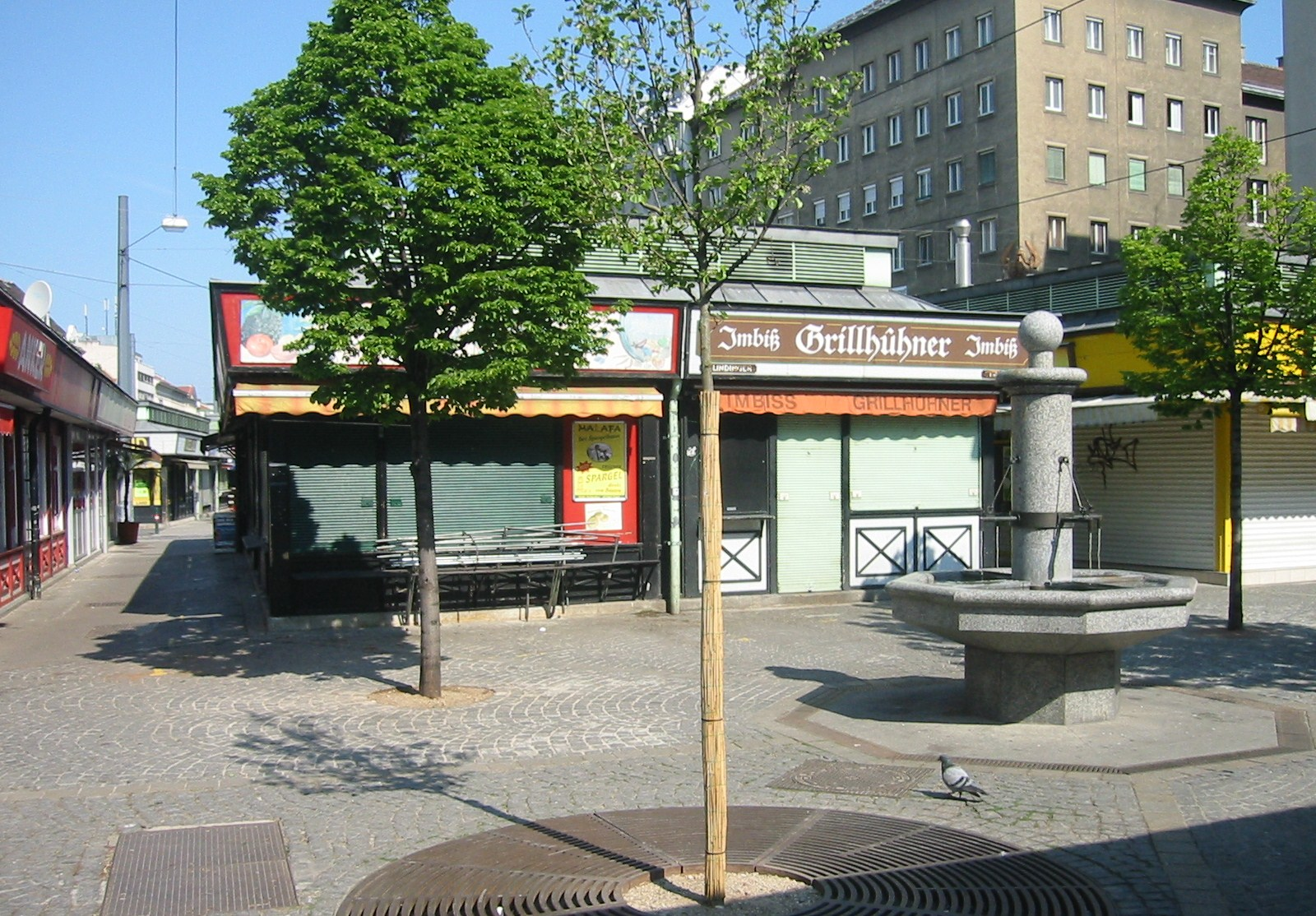
Marktstände and Brunnen am Rochusmarkt

Rochusmarkt

- Place: Landstraßer Hauptstraße, Rasumofskygasse 48°12′9.43″N 16°23′25.69″E
- Opening hours: Monday til Friday 6-19.30 o'clock, Saturday 6-17 o'clock
- Gastronomy: Monday til Saturday 6 til 22 o'clock
- Accessibility: U3, 4A, 74A
- market with farmhouse market

Landstraßer Markt

- Place: Invalidenstraße 2 48°12′22.85″N 16°23′4.90″E
- Opening hours: Seit 2008 geschlossen.
- Accessibility: U3, U4, S-Bahn, O, 74A

Former markets

- Heumarkt (Am Heumarkt Street, formerly Heugries, Im Gereit)
- Viehmarktgasse

== 4th and 6th District ==
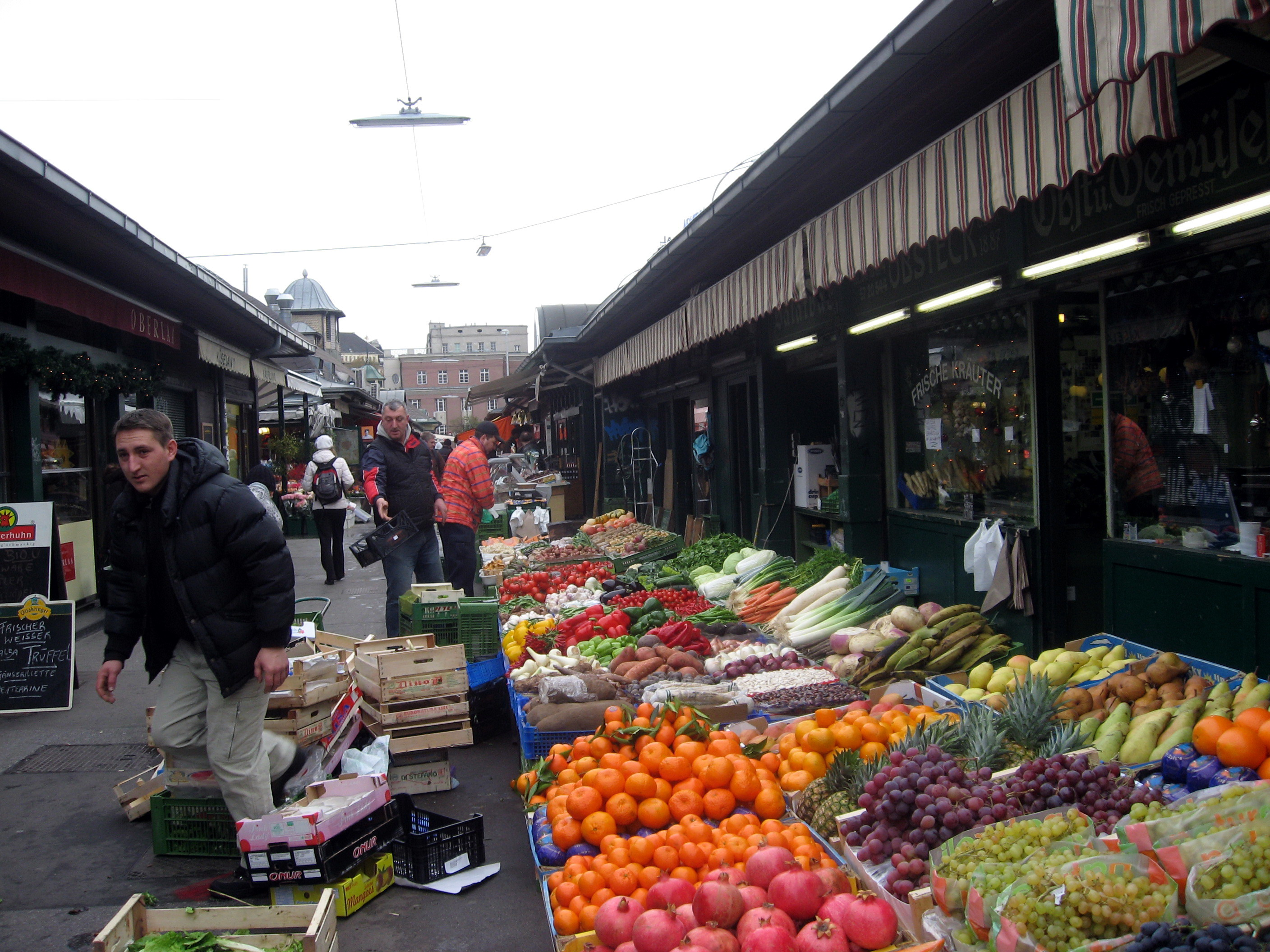
Naschmarkt

Naschmarkt

- Place: Wienzeile between Getreidemarkt and Kettenbrückengasse 48°11′53.62″N 16°21′44.63″E
- Opening hours: Monday til Friday 6-19.30 o'clock, Saturday 6-17 o'clock
- Gastronomy: Monday til Saturday 6-23 o'clock, farmhouse market jeden Saturday til 17 o'clock
- Accessibility: U4, 59A

Flohmarkt

- Place: Linke Wienzeile bei der Kettenbrückengasse 48°11′48.95″N 16°21′29.24″E
- Opening hours: Saturday 6.30-18 o'clock (auch an Feiertagen)
- Accessibility: U4

Temporärer Markt Mariahilfer Straße

- Place: Vorplatz der Kirche Maria Hilf 48°11′57.05″N 16°21′8.91″E
- Opening hours: Monday, Wednesday, Friday 9-18:30 o'clock, Saturday 9-14 o'clock, erster Saturday/Monat 9-18 o'clock
- Accessibility: U3, 2A, 13A, 14A

== 10th District ==
Viktor-Adler-markt

- Place: Viktor-Adler-Platz 48°10′36.24″N 16°22′33.45″E
- Opening hours: Monday til Friday 6-19.30 o'clock, Saturday 6-17 o'clock
- Gastronomie Monday til Saturday 6 til 22 o'clock
- Accessibility: U1, 6, 14A, 67
- market with farmhouse market

== 11th District ==
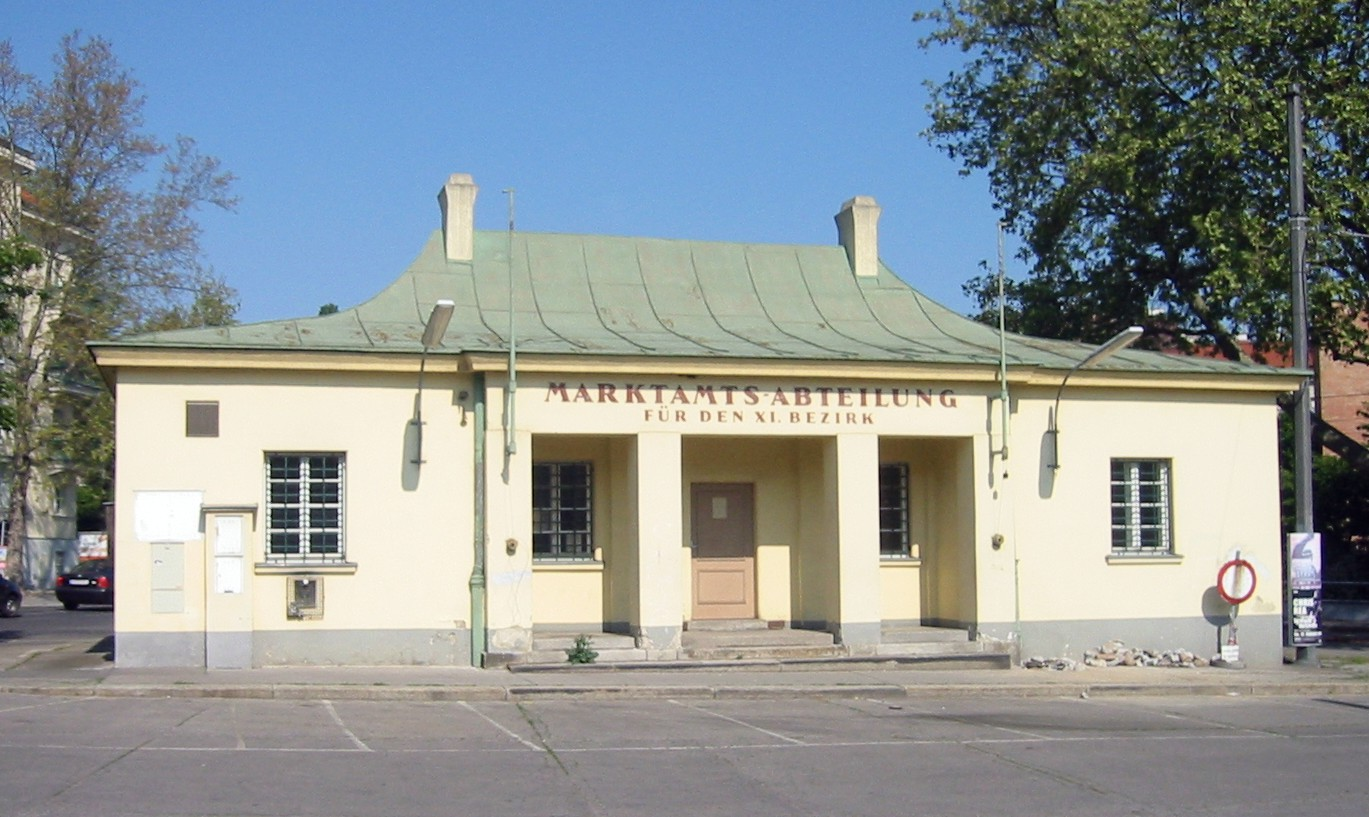
Simmeringer Markt, denkmalgeschütztes Marktamts-Gebäude

Simmeringer Markt

- Place: Geiselbergstraße, Lorystraße 48°10′26.94″N 16°24′42.45″E
- Opening hours: Seit 2009 geschlossen
- Accessibility: U3 (Enkplatz), 6
- Ursprünglicher Standort war im 19. Jahrhundert der Enkplatz, im Zuge des Baus der Neusimmeringer Pfarrkirche wurde der Markt zuerst in die Sedlitzkygasse and dann hierher verlegt. Bis Mai 2009 befand sich hier ein Markt with farmhouse market and Gastronomie, seither wird das Areal in ein Bildungszentrum umgebaut. In das denkmalgeschützten Marktamtsgebäude soll eine Kinderbücherei einziehen, die ebenfalls unter Denkmalschutz stehende öffentliche WC-Anlage wird als Zugang zu einer Volksgarage genutzt.

== 12th District ==
Meidlinger Markt

- Place: Niederhofstraße, Rosaliagasse, Reschgasse, Ignazgasse 48°10′50.62″N 16°19′57.72″E
- Opening hours: Monday til Friday 6-19.30 o'clock, Saturday 6-17 o'clock
- Gastronomy: Monday til Saturday 6 til 21 o'clock
- Accessibility: U6, 10A, 63A
- market with farmhouse market

== 15th District ==
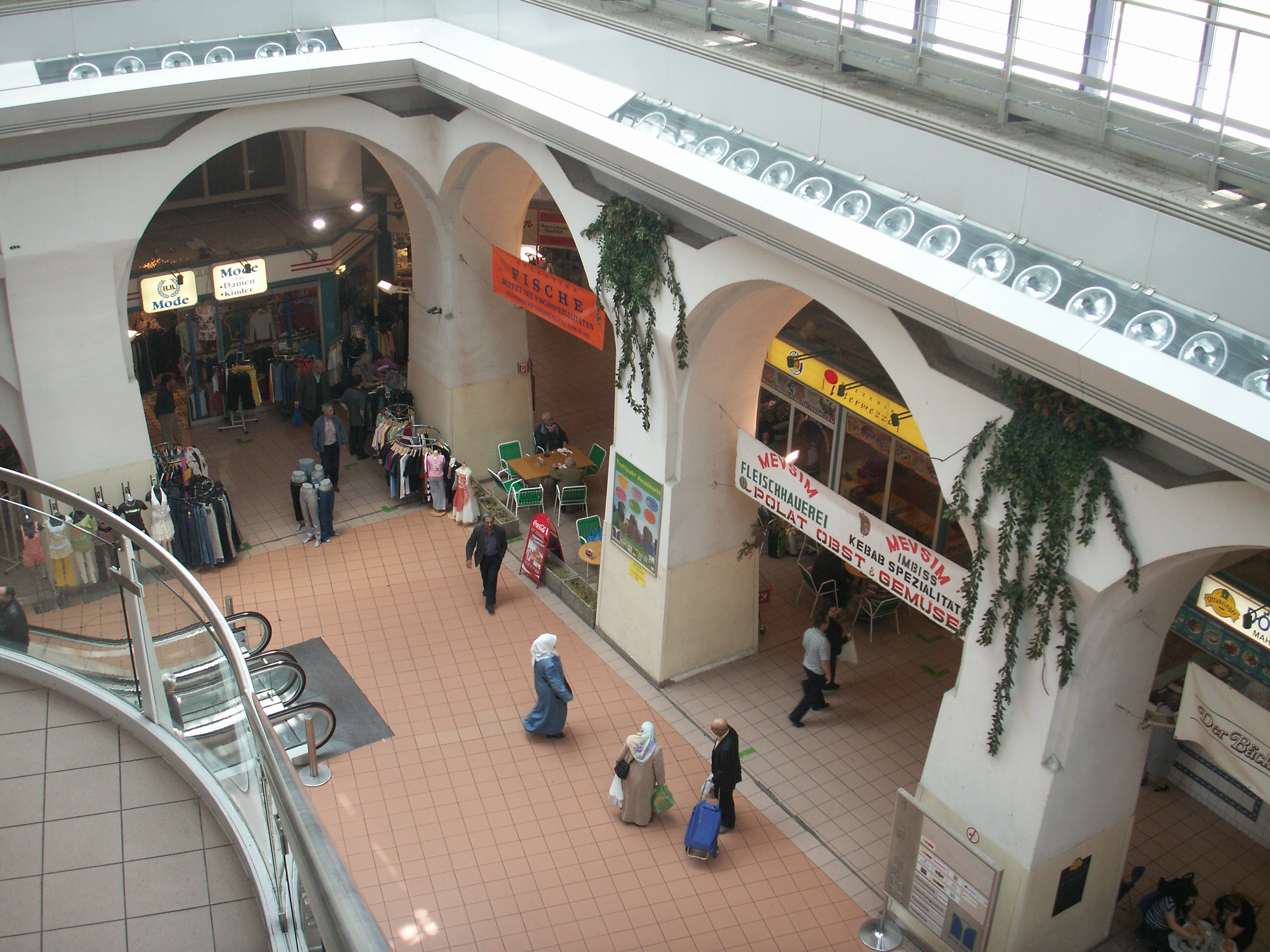
Meiselmarkt, Wien 15., Pfeiler des ehemaligen Wasserbehälters

Meiselmarkt

- Place: Hütteldorfer Straße, Ecke Johnstraße 48°11′55.01″N 16°19′8.29″E
- Opening hours: Monday til Friday 6-19.30 o'clock, Saturday 6-17 o'clock
- Gastronomy: Monday til Saturday 6 til 21 o'clock
- Accessibility: U3, 10A, 12A, 49
- market with farmhouse market

Schwendermarkt

- Place: Schwendergasse, Mariahilfer Straße 48°11′27.99″N 16°19′36.02″E
- Opening hours: Monday til Friday 6-21 o'clock, Saturday 6-17 o'clock
- Gastronomy: Monday til Saturday 6 til 21 o'clock
- Accessibility: 12A, 52, 58

== 16th District ==
Brunnenmarkt and Yppenmarkt

- Place: Brunnengasse and Yppenplatz 48°12′48.71″N 16°20′8.87″E
- Opening hours: Monday til Friday 6-19.30 o'clock, Saturday 6-17 o'clock
- Gastronomy: Monday til Saturday 6 til 22 o'clock
- Accessibility: U6, 2, 44, 46
- Märkte with farmhouse market

== 18th District ==
Kutschkermarkt

- Place: Kutschkergasse 48°13′31.76″N 16°20′39.26″E
- Opening hours: Monday til Friday 6-19.30 o'clock, Saturday 6-17 o'clock
- Gastronomy: Monday til Saturday 6 til 21 o'clock
- Accessibility: 40, 41
- Bio-Eck jeden Saturday, market with farmhouse market

Gersthofer Markt

- Place: Gersthofer Platzl 48°13′52.17″N 16°19′42.29″E
- Opening hours: Monday til Friday 6-19.30 o'clock, Saturday 6-17 o'clock
- Gastronomy: Monday til Saturday 6 til 21 o'clock
- Accessibility: S-Bahn (S45), 9, 10A, 40, 41
- market with farmhouse market

Johann-Nepomuk-Vogl-markt

- Place: Johann-Nepomuk-Vogl-Platz 48°13′25.01″N 16°20′10.59″E
- Opening hours: Monday til Friday 6-19.30 o'clock, Saturday 6-17 o'clock
- Gastronomy: Monday til Saturday 6 til 21 o'clock
- Accessibility: 9, 42

== 19th District ==
Nußdorfer Markt

- Place: Heiligenstädter Straße, Sickenberggasse 48°15′27.41″N 16°22′0.39″E
- Opening hours: Monday til Friday 6-19.30 o'clock, Saturday 6-17 o'clock
- Gastronomy: Monday til Saturday 6 til 21 o'clock
- Accessibility: D

Sonnbergmarkt

- Place: Sonnbergplatz 48°14′33.61″N 16°20′27.15″E
- Opening hours: Monday til Friday 6-19.30 o'clock, Saturday 6-17 o'clock
- Gastronomy: Monday til Saturday 6 til 21 o'clock
- Accessibility: S-Bahn (S45), 35A

== 20th District ==
Hannovermarkt

- Place: Hannovergasse, Othmargasse 48°13′54.62″N 16°22′6.46″E
- Opening hours: Monday til Friday 6-18.30 o'clock, Saturday 6-14 o'clock
- Accessibility: 5, 31, 33
- market with farmhouse market

== 21st District ==
Floridsdorfer Markt

- Place: Brünner Straße, Pitkagasse 48°15′41.79″N 16°24′3.98″E
- Opening hours: Monday til Friday 6-19.30 o'clock, Saturday 6-17 o'clock
- Gastronomy: Monday til Saturday 6 til 21 o'clock
- Accessibility: 30, 31
- market with farmhouse market

== 22nd District ==
Genochmarkt

- Place: Genochplatz 48°13′42.28″N 16°27′18.69″E
- Opening hours: Monday til Friday 6-19.30 o'clock, Saturday 6-17 o'clock
- Accessibility: S-Bahn, 26, 26A, 27A, 83A, 94A, 95B, 96B

Temporärer Markt Quadenstraße

- Place: bei der Maschlgasse
- Opening hours: Wednesday 12-18.30 o'clock, Saturday 7-13 o'clock
- Accessibility: 95B

Temporärer Markt Wacquantgasse

- Place: Siegesplatz
- Opening hours: Friday 13-19 o'clock
- Accessibility: 26, 84A, 93A, 97A

== 23rd District ==
Temporärer Markt Liesing

- Place: Liesinger Platz
- Opening hours: Tuesday and Friday 12-18.30 o'clock, Saturday 7-13 o'clock
- Accessibility: S-Bahn, 60A, 62A, 64A, 66A

== Literature ==
- Werner T. Bauer, Jörg Klauber (photography): Die Wiener Märkte: 100 Märkte, von Naschmarkt til Flohmarkt. Mit einer umfassenden Geschichte des Marktwesens in Wien. Falter, Wien 1996, ISBN 3-85439-162-5
