= Patay =

Patay may refer to:

== Foods ==
- Patay (cake), a dessert

== People ==
- Franz Patay (born 1961), Austrian arts administrator
- Marius Patay {fr, de}, French inventor
- Pál Patay {de, hu, ia}, Hungarian archeologist
- Vilmos Patay (born 1953), Hungarian politician

== Places ==
- Patay, Argentina
- Patay, Loiret, France

== See also ==
- Battle of Patay
- Pate (disambiguation)
