= Raimund Theater =

Musical theater in Vienna, Austria

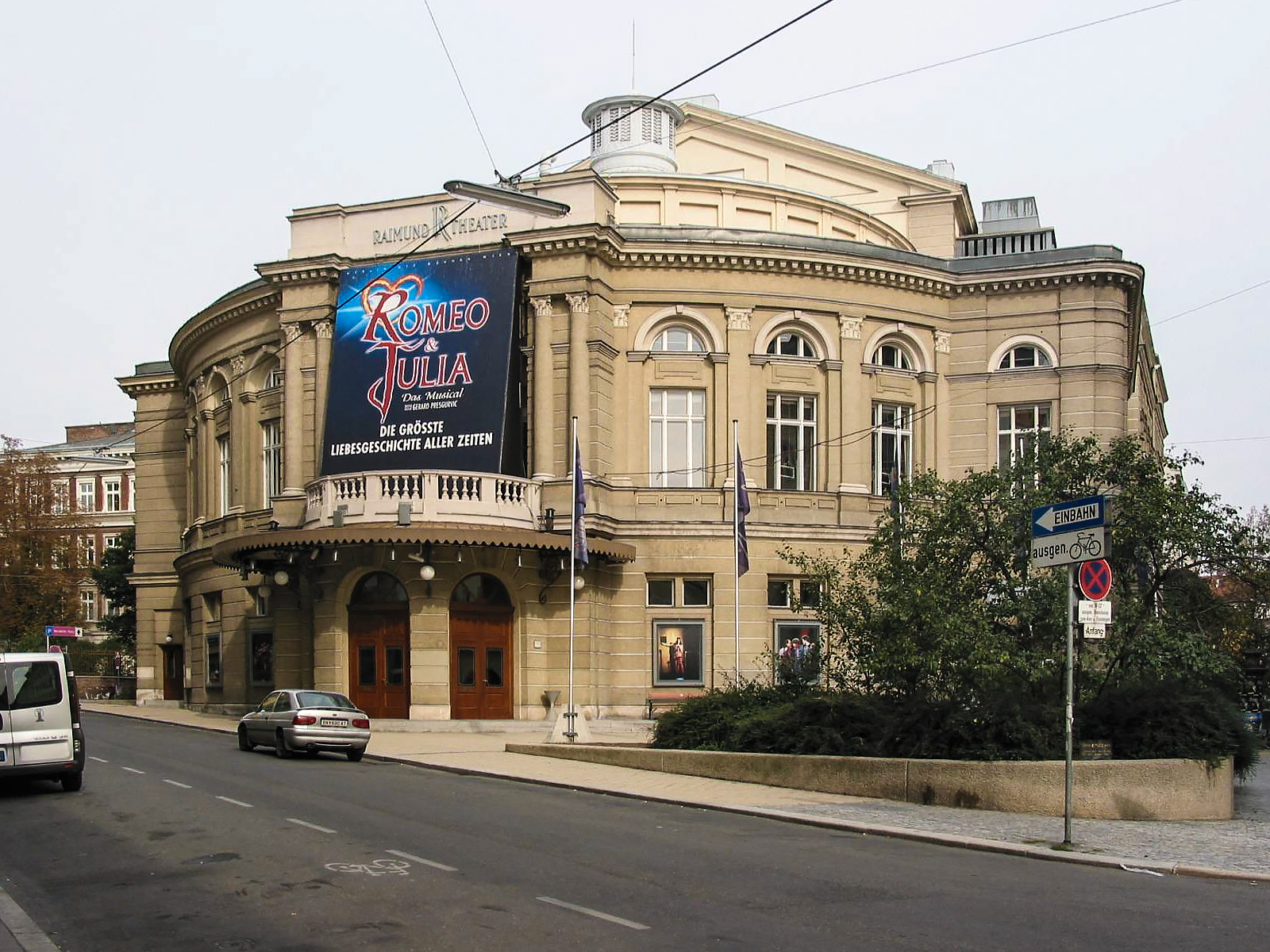
- Interactive map of Raimund Theater
- Address: Vienna; Austria
- Coordinates: 48°11′32″N 16°20′23″E
- Owner: Vereinigte Bühnen Wien

Construction
- Opened: 28 November 1893

Website
- www.musicalvienna.at

The Raimund Theater is a theatre in the Mariahilf district of Vienna, Austria.

Named after the Austrian dramatist Ferdinand Raimund, the theatre was built by an association of Viennese citizens and opened on 28 November 1893 with Raimund's play Die gefesselte Phantasie. It can seat around 1,200 people.

The theater is currently owned by Vereinigte Bühnen Wien (VBW) along with the Theater an der Wien and the Ronacher. Its current main use is for major musical productions.

== History ==
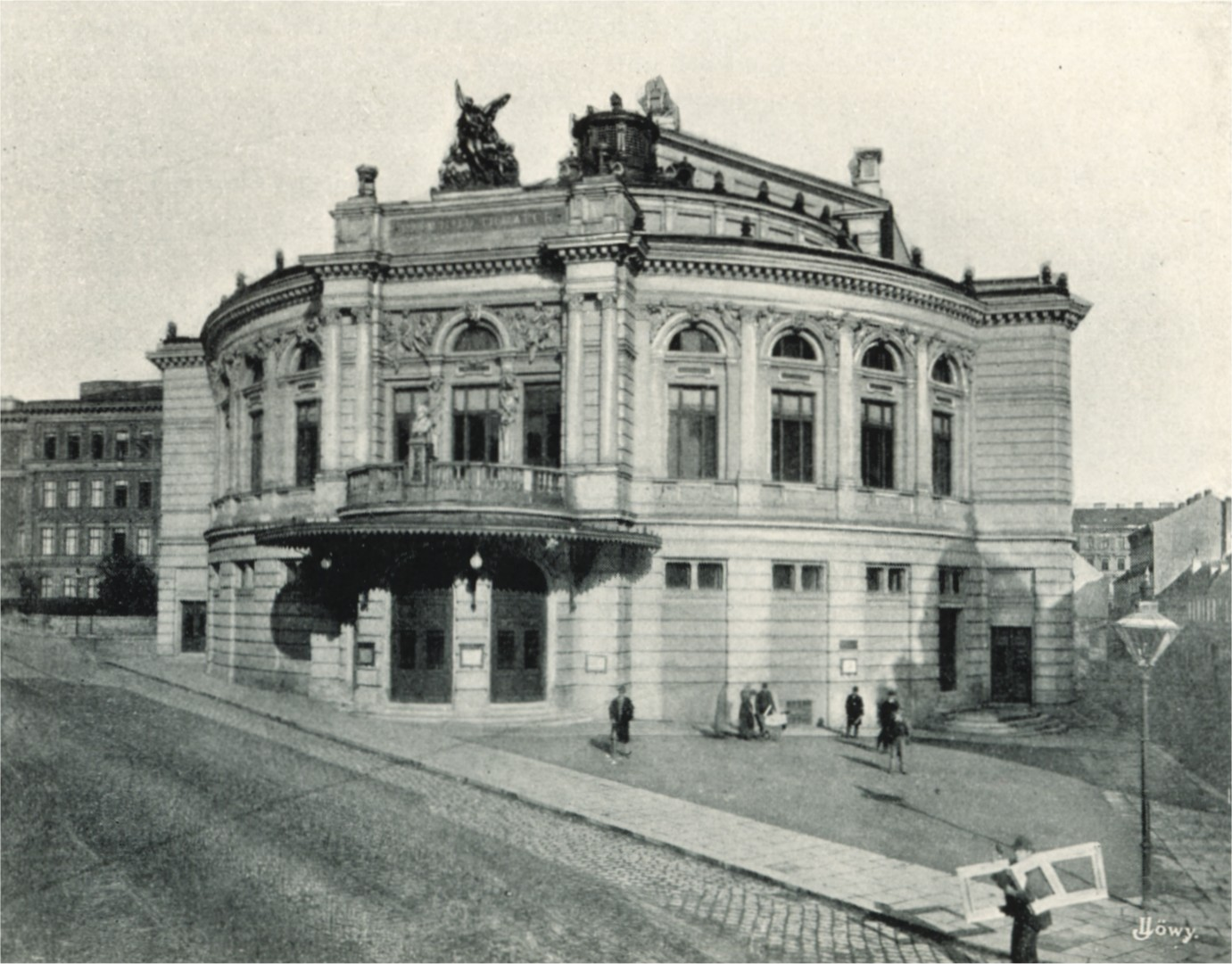
Raimund Theater in 1898

=== Early history ===
The theater is named after the Austrian dramatist Ferdinand Raimund, it was built by an association of 500 residents of the municipality of Mariahilf. It is designed by Franz Roth and opened on 28 November 1893, fully lit by electricity. Raimund's play Die gefesselte Phantasie opened at the theater (Though its first performance was on 27 November 1893). The theatre mainly presented German folk dramas and plays.

In 1908 it turned to operetta, with Johann Strauss' The Gypsy Baron. Other premieres included Robert Stolz's Das Glücksmädel and Dreimäderlhaus, set to various pieces of music by Franz Schubert; this was performed more than 1200 times between 1916 and 1927.

As the theatre was spared bombing damage during World War II, the theatre re-opened promptly on 25 April 1945 with Dreimäderlhaus. In 1948, Rudolf Marik took over as director for almost 30 years, transforming it into an internationally recognised theatre of the German-speaking world exclusively staging operettas with stars such as Johannes Heesters, Marika Rökk, and others. Many well-known actors started their careers at the Raimund Theatre, including Hansi Niese, Paula Wessely, Attila Hörbiger, and Karl Skraup. After 1976 the theatre was occasionally used for musicals, such as Kurt Weill's Lady in the Dark.

=== Renovation ===
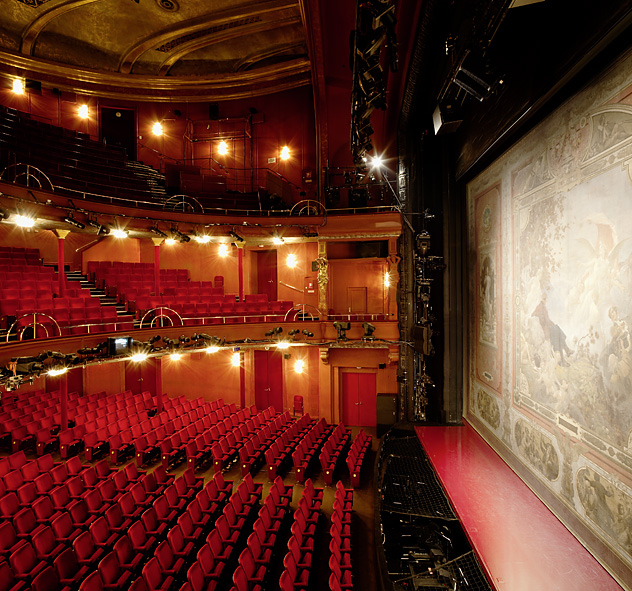
Inside the theater

In 1985 the theatre was renovated, re-opening with the gala Seinerzeit; since March 1987 it has formed part of the Vereinigte Bühnen Wien. A Chorus Line was followed by Les Misérables in 1988 and Phantom of the Opera in 1990, which transferred from the Theater an der Wien.

In 1993, on the anniversary of its opening, the German-language version of Kiss of the Spider Woman was premiered. This was followed by the Austrian premiere of Grease in 1994 and the European premiere of Disney's Beauty and the Beast in 1995. Autumn 1997 saw the world premiere of Dance of the Vampires in Roman Polanski's production. After Joseph and the Amazing Technicolor Dreamcoat and a new production of Hair in September 2002, Wake Up was premiered, being the first musical by Rainhard Fendrich and Harold Faltermeyer.

On 11 March 2004 Dave Stewart's rock musical Barbarella had its world premiere. This was followed in 2005 by the German-language version of Romeo & Julia, a musical by Gérard Presgurvic based on Shakespeare.

In September 2006, the new musical Rebecca, by Michael Kunze and Sylvester Levay, premiered at the theatre.

On 24 January 2008 the musical We Will Rock You featuring the music of Queen opened at the Raimund with its largest ever advance ticket sale of 90,000. Original Queen members Roger Taylor and Brian May joined the cast on stage for the finale.

After "We will rock You", The Musical "Rebecca" came back for a short season from September until the end of December 2008. On 26 February 2009, the theatre opened with a new production of the "VBW", the musical "Rudolf - Affaire Mayerling". This production was a "Try-out" at Budapest and then it moved to Vienna.

In March 2010 a musical with songs by Udo Jürgens, an Austrian songwriter and entertainer, called "Ich war noch niemals in New York" opened and is going to stay until the end of June 2012.

In September 2012 the musical Elisabeth will return for the third time to Vienna, but for the first time at Raimund Theatre. From 1992 until 1998 and from 2003 until 2005 the musical took place at the famous Theater an der Wien.
