= VBW =

VBW may refer to:

- Video bandwidth (spectrum analysis), used in electronic signal processing
- Air Burkina, airline with ICAO identification "VBW"
- Vereinigte Bühnen Wien, musical production company based in Vienna
- Vereinigte Bern–Worb-Bahnen, a former Swiss light railway in Bern
