= IMZ =

IMZ may refer to:

- IMZ (file format), a compressed floppy disk image
- Irbitskiy Mototsikletniy Zavod, a Russian motorcycle manufacturer
- The International Music and Media Centre
