= Theater an der Wien =

Historic building in Vienna, Austria

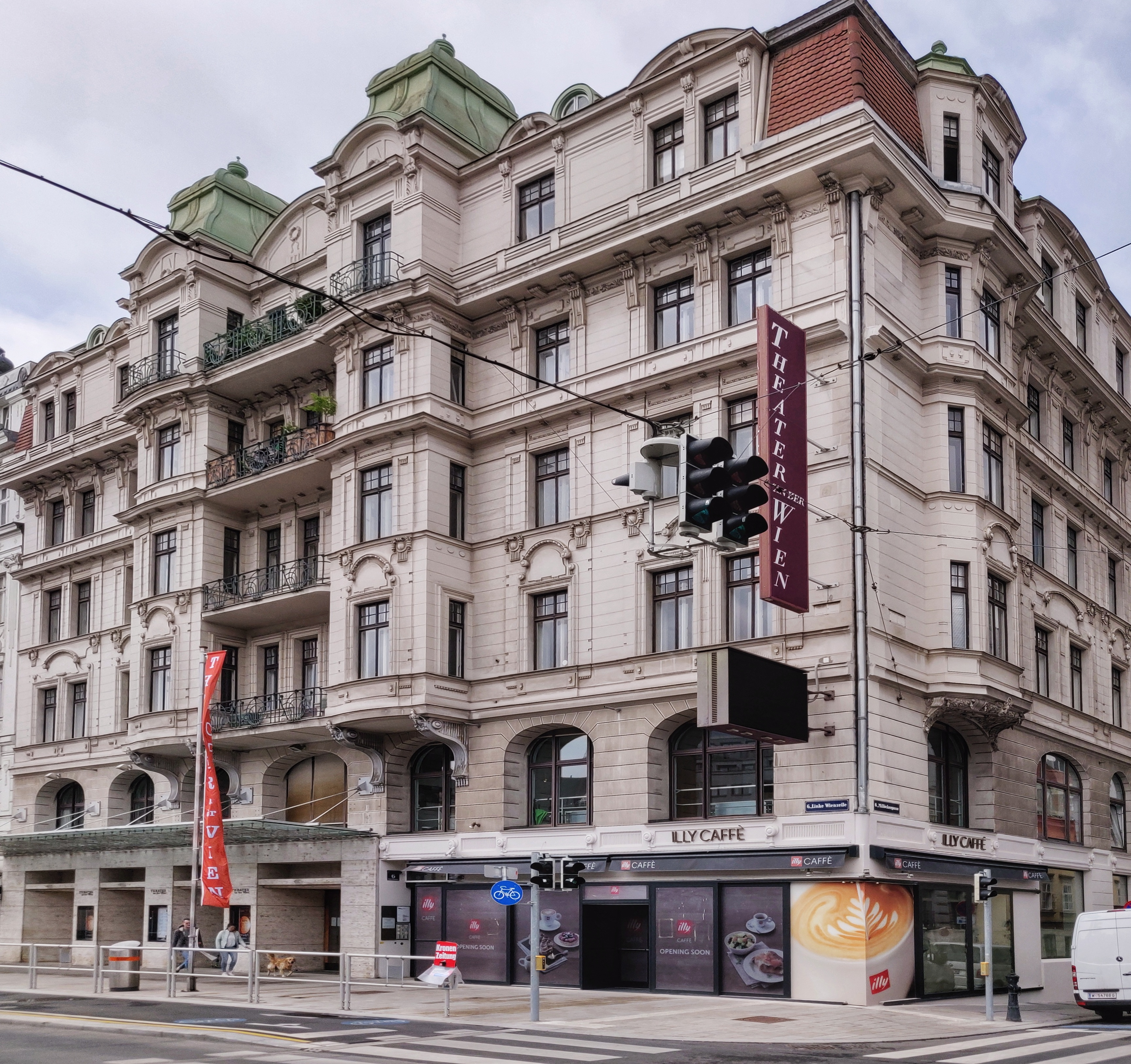
- Interactive map of Theater an der Wien
- Location: Vienna, Austria
- Coordinates: 48°11′58.5″N 16°21′50″E
- Owner: Vereinigte Bühnen Wien
- Type: Opera house

Construction
- Opened: 13 June 1801

Website
- www.theater-wien.at/en/home

The Theater an der Wien is a historic theatre in Vienna located on the Left Wienzeile in the Mariahilf district. Completed in 1801, the theatre has hosted the premieres of many celebrated works of theatre, opera, and symphonic music. Since 2006, it has served primarily as an opera house, hosting its own company.

Although "Wien" is German for "Vienna", the "Wien" in the name of the theatre is actually the name of the Wien River, which once flowed by the theatre site; "an der Wien" means "on the banks of the Wien". In modern times, the river has been covered over in this location and the covered riverbed now houses the Naschmarkt, an open-air market.

The theatre is operated in cooperation with Vereinigte Bühnen Wien (VBW) which also operates the Raimund Theater and the Ronacher.

== History ==
=== Early history ===
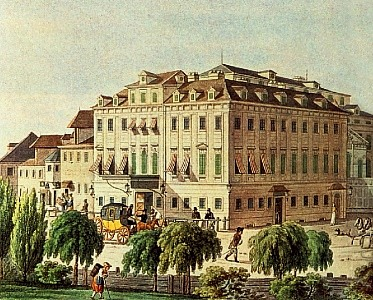
Theater an der Wien, 1815

The theatre was the brainchild of the Viennese theatrical impresario Emanuel Schikaneder, who is best known as Mozart's librettist and collaborator on the opera The Magic Flute (1791). Schikaneder's troupe had already been successfully performing for several years in Vienna in the smaller Theater auf der Wieden and this is where The Magic Flute had premiered. As the troupe's performances often emphasized spectacle and scenery, the librettist felt ready to move to a larger and better equipped venue.

He had already been granted an imperial licence to build a new theatre in 1786, but it was only in 1798 that he felt ready to act on this authorization. The building was designed by the architect Franz Jäger in Empire style (it has since been remodeled). Construction was completed in 1801. The theatre has been described as "the most lavishly equipped and one of the largest theatres of its age".

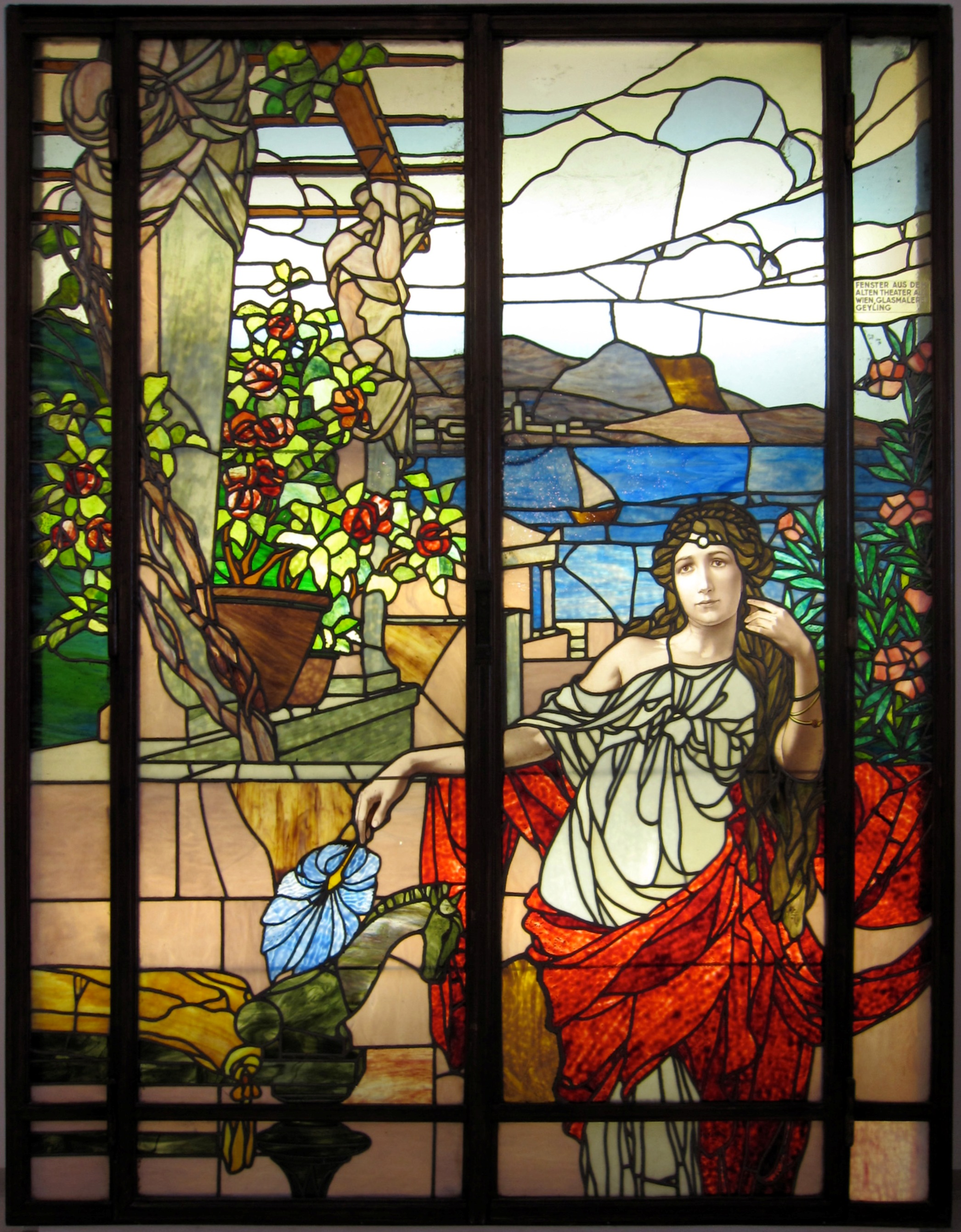
Stained glass window by Carl Geyling's Erben, made around 1900 for the theatre

The theatre opened on 13 June 1801 with a prologue written by Schikaneder followed by a performance of the opera Alexander by Franz Teyber. The new theatre proved to be a sensation. Adolf Bäurle, a local critic, wrote "if Schikaneder and [his partner] Zitterbarth had had the idea ... to charge admission simply for looking at the glories of their Theater an der Wien, Schikaneder would certainly have been able to take in vast sums of money without giving one single performance." The Allgemeine musikalische Zeitung called it the "most comfortable and satisfactory in the whole of Germany" (which meant at the time, "all German-speaking lands").

In 1807 the theatre was acquired by a group of court nobles that included Count Ferdinand Palffy von Erdöd, who bought it outright in 1813. During the period of his proprietorship, which lasted until 1826, he offered opera and ballet and, to appeal to a wider Viennese audience, popular pantomime and variety acts, losing money in elaborate spectacles until finally he was forced to sell the theatre at auction in 1826.

Only a part of the original building is preserved: the Papagenotor (Papageno Gate) is a memorial to Schikaneder, who is depicted playing the role of Papageno in The Magic Flute, a role he wrote for himself to perform. He is accompanied by the Three Boys, characters in the same opera.

From 1889 to 1905, Alexandrine von Schönerer was managing director after the lease ended in 1884 between her and the librettist Camillo Walzel.

In the late 19th to early 20th centuries, the theatre experienced a golden age during the flourishing of Viennese operetta, as referenced in the list below.

=== Later history ===
From 1945 to 1955, it was one of the temporary homes of the Vienna State Opera, whose own building had been destroyed by Allied bombing during World War II. However, in 1955, the theatre was closed for safety reasons. It languished unused for several years, and by the early 1960s, the threat had emerged that it would be converted to a parking garage. (This was the same era of "urban renewal" that in America nearly destroyed Carnegie Hall).

By 1962 the theatre had a new and successful role as a venue for contemporary musical theatre. Many English-language musicals had their German premieres there. In 1992, the musical Elisabeth (about Franz Joseph I of Austria's wife, Elisabeth of Bavaria, also known as Sisi), premiered there and ran for six consecutive years until 1998; Elisabeth went on to become the most successful German-language musical to date, returning to the Theater an der Wien for a revival production from 2003 to 2005. The musical Cats directed and choreographed by Gillian Lynne played successfully for seven years.

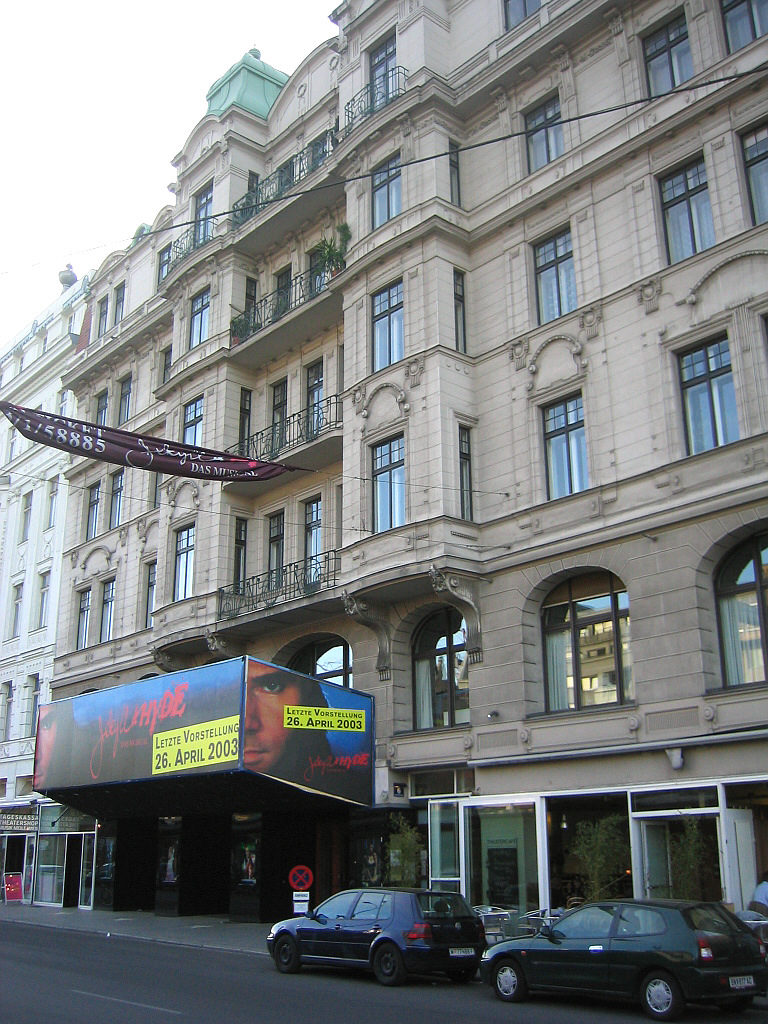
The Theater an der Wien during the period it emphasized Broadway musicals. The Broadway-style marquee was removed in 2005.

Despite its focus on operettas and musicals, the theatre still served as a venue for occasional opera productions, especially during the Vienna Festival seasons, and sometimes co-produced with the Vienna State Opera. Notable productions of the non-standard repertory include:

- Alban Berg's Lulu (1962), conducted by Karl Böhm, staged by Otto Schenk, designed by Caspar Neher, and starring Evelyn Lear
- Joseph Haydn's Orfeo ed Euridice (1967), conducted by Richard Bonynge, staged by Rudolf Hartmann, and starring Nicolai Gedda and Joan Sutherland
- Claudio Monteverdi's Il ritorno d'Ulisse in patria (1971), conducted by Nikolaus Harnoncourt, and staged by Federik Mirdita
- Wolfgang Amadeus Mozart's La clemenza di Tito (1976), conducted by Julius Rudel, staged by Mirdita, and starring Werner Hollweg, Teresa Berganza, Arleen Auger, and Edda Moser
- Franz Schubert's Fierrabras (1988), conducted by Claudio Abbado, staged by Ruth Berghaus, and starring Thomas Hampson, Karita Mattila, and László Polgár
- The world premiere of Adriana Hölszky's Die Wände (1995), conducted by Ulf Schirmer, and staged by Hans Neuenfels

Between 1996 and 2002, Riccardo Muti conducted new productions of the three Da Ponte operas of Mozart, based on an original production by Giorgio Strehler.

=== Today ===
In 2006, the 250th anniversary year of Mozart's birth, the Theater an der Wien presented a series of major Mozart operas, thus initiating its conversion to a full-time venue for opera and other forms of classical music under the direction of Roland Geyer. Major musical productions since are now presented at either the Raimund Theater or the Ronacher. The first opera to be given was Mozart's Idomeneo with Neil Shicoff in the title role and Peter Schneider conducting the new production by Willy Decker. Other members of the cast were Angelika Kirchschlager, Genia Kühmeier, and Barbara Frittoli.

Geyer is quoted as saying that he wishes to "present cutting edge directors and interesting productions", and his three main areas of focus are on Baroque opera, contemporary opera, and Mozart.

In recent years, the theatre's seasons have included the following works outside the standard repertoire:

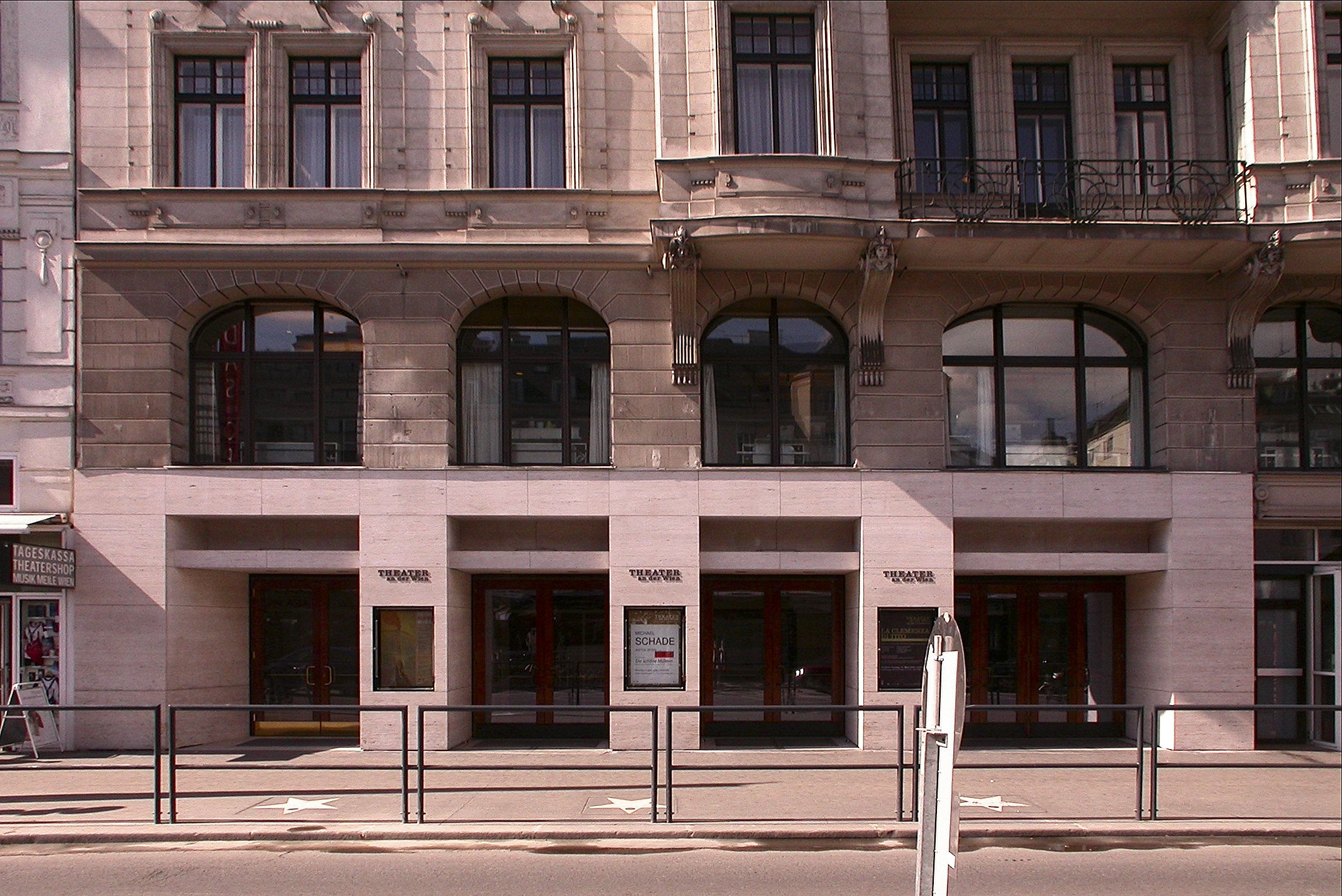
Entrance wing facing Naschmarkt, redesigned in 2006

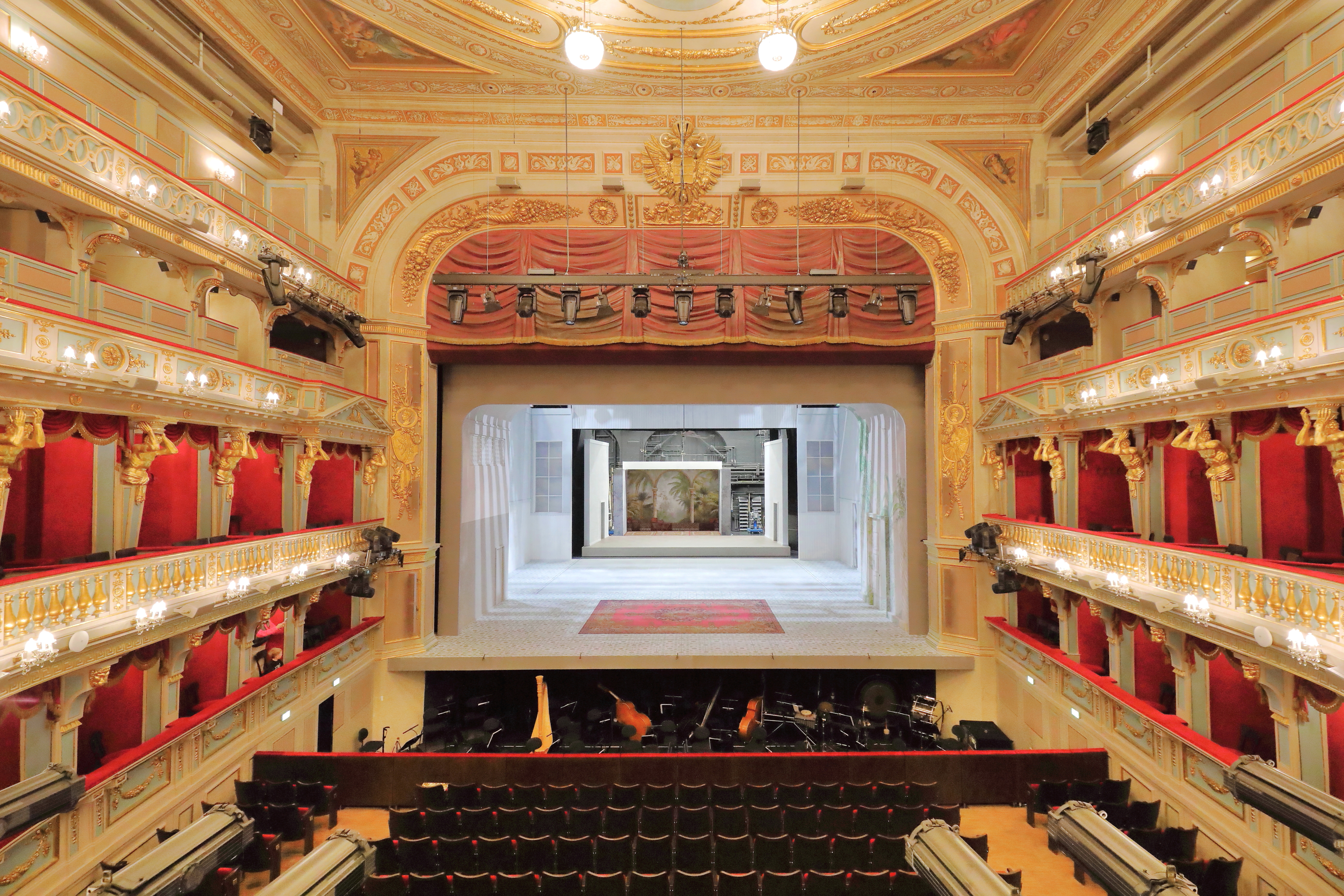
Theater an der Wien interior, 2025

- Ian Bell: The Harlot's Progress with Diana Damrau in the title role.
- Hector Berlioz: Béatrice et Bénédict, conducted by Leo Hussain, staged by Kasper Holten featuring Malena Ernman and Christiane Karg
- Claude Debussy: Pelléas et Mélisande conducted by Bertrand de Billy
- Christoph Willibald Gluck: Orfeo ed Euridice conducted by René Jacobs
- George Frideric Handel:
  - Ariodante, conducted by Christophe Rousset, staged by Lukas Hemleb
  - Partenope, conducted by Christophe Rousset, staged by Pierre Audi
  - Semele, conducted by William Christie (with Les Arts Florissants), staged by Robert Carsen, featuring Cecilia Bartoli
  - Radamisto, conducted by René Jacobs, staged by Vincent Boussard featuring David Daniels
- Joseph Haydn: Orlando paladino; conducted by Nikolaus Harnoncourt, staged by Keith Warner
- Jake Heggie: Dead Man Walking, conducted by Sian Edwards, staged by Nikolaus Lehnhoff
- Leoš Janáček: Káťa Kabanová, conducted by Kirill Petrenko, staging by Keith Warner
- Wolfgang Amadeus Mozart:
  - La finta semplice, conducted by Fabio Luisi, staged by Laurent Pelly;
  - Mitridate, re di Ponto conducted by Harry Bicket, staged by Robert Carsen;
  - Idomeneo, conducted by René Jacobs, staged by Damiano Michieletto
- Francis Poulenc: Dialogues des Carmélites; conducted by Bertrand de Billy, staged by Robert Carsen
- André Previn: A Streetcar Named Desire, conducted by Sian Edwards, staged by Stein Winge
- Jean-Philippe Rameau: Platée, conducted by William Christie, staged by Robert Carsen
- Richard Strauss: Intermezzo conducted by Kirill Petrenko
- Igor Stravinsky: The Rake's Progress conducted by Nikolaus Harnoncourt
- Giacomo Puccini:Il trittico, conducted by Rani Calderon, staged by Damiano Michieletto featuring Patricia Racette and Roberto Frontali
- Paul Hindemith: Mathis der Maler, conducted by Bertrand de Billy, staged by Keith Warner
- Federico Moreno Torroba: Luisa Fernanda, conducted by Josep Caballé-Domenech, staged by Emilio Sagi
- Giuseppe Verdi:
  - I due Foscari, conducted by James Conlon, staged by Thaddeus Strassberger with Plácido Domingo in the lead role
  - Attila, conducted by Riccardo Frizza, staged by Peter Konwitschny featuring Dmitry Belosselskiy
- Carl Maria von Weber: Der Freischütz, conducted by Bertrand de Billy, staged by Stefan Ruzowitzky

== Premieres ==
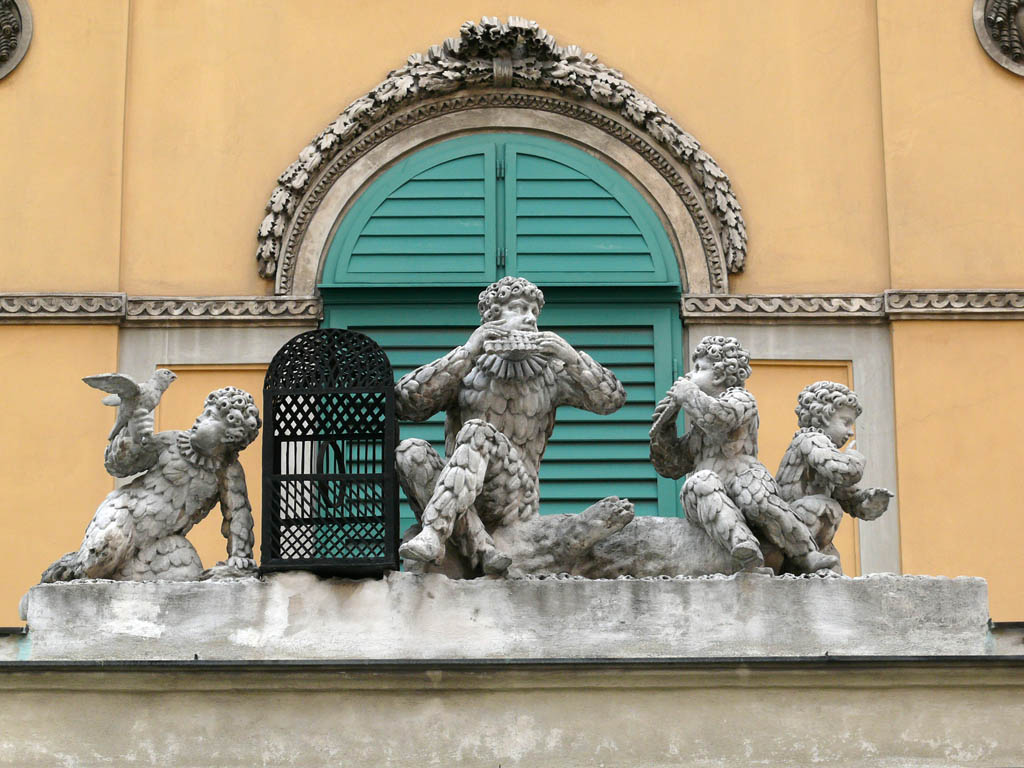
Papageno Gate in Millöckergasse

The Theater an der Wien has seen the premieres of many works by celebrated composers and playwrights. It was a particularly favorite venue for Ludwig van Beethoven, who actually lived in rooms inside the theatre, at Schikaneder's invitation, during part of the period he was composing his opera Fidelio.

=== List of premieres ===
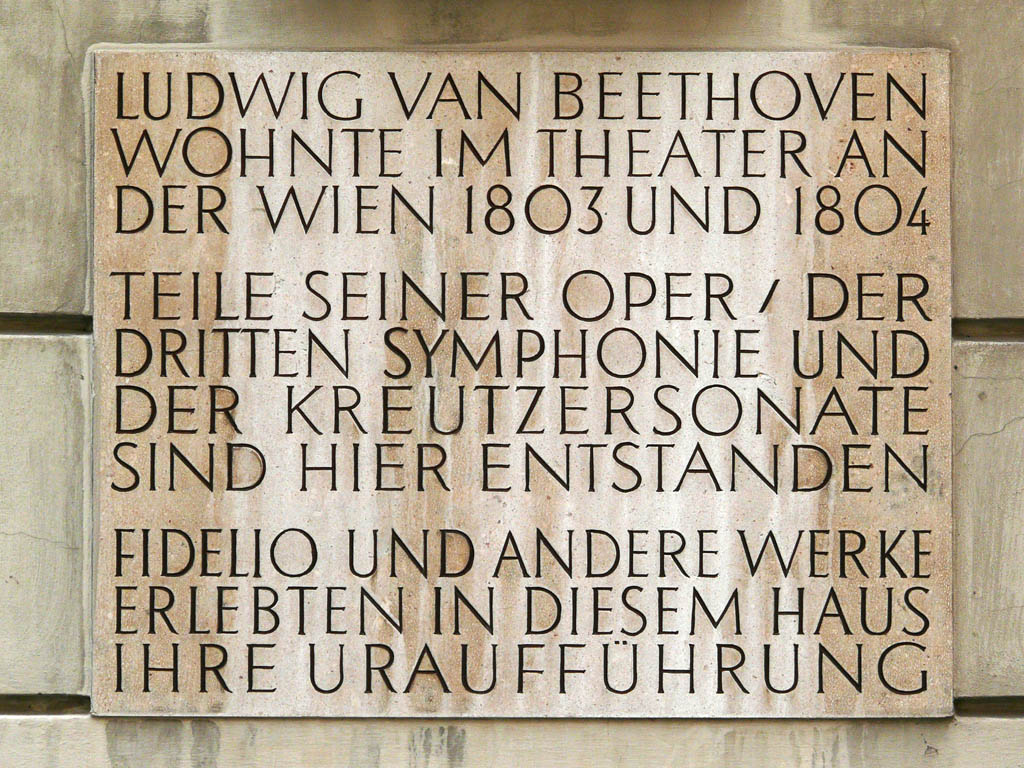
The Beethoven memorial displayed on the exterior wall of the theatre. The text reads, "Ludwig van Beethoven lived in the Theater an der Wien in 1803 and 1804. Parts of his opera, the Third Symphony, and the Kreutzer Sonata were written here. Fidelio and other works received their first performance in this house."

- 10 November 1804: Die Neger, Antonio Salieri's last opera
- 1817: Die Ahnfrau by Franz Grillparzer
- 20 December 1823: Rosamunde, Fürstin von Zypern, a play by Helmina von Chézy with incidental music by Franz Schubert
- 9 April 1844: Der Zerrissene by Johann Nestroy
- 5 April 1874: Die Fledermaus by Johann Strauss II
- 6 December 1882: Der Bettelstudent by Carl Millöcker
- 24 October 1885: The Gypsy Baron by Johann Strauss II
- 10 January 1891: Der Vogelhändler by Carl Zeller
- 5 January 1898: Der Opernball by Richard Heuberger
- 30 December 1905: The Merry Widow by Franz Lehár
- 14 November 1908: The Chocolate Soldier by Oscar Straus
- 12 November 1909: Der Graf von Luxemburg by Franz Lehár
- 28 February 1924: Gräfin Mariza by Emmerich Kálmán

==== Works by Beethoven ====
- 5 April 1803: Symphony No. 2, Piano Concerto No. 3, Christ on the Mount of Olives
- 7 April 1805: Symphony No. 3
- 20 November 1805: Leonore, oder Der Triumph der ehelichen Liebe, entitled in later versions Fidelio
- 23 December 1806: The Violin Concerto
- 22 December 1808: Symphonies No. 5 and No. 6, the Choral Fantasy, Piano Concerto No. 4.
