= Ronacher =

Musical theater in Vienna, Austria

Coordinates: 48.2051°N 16.3753°E

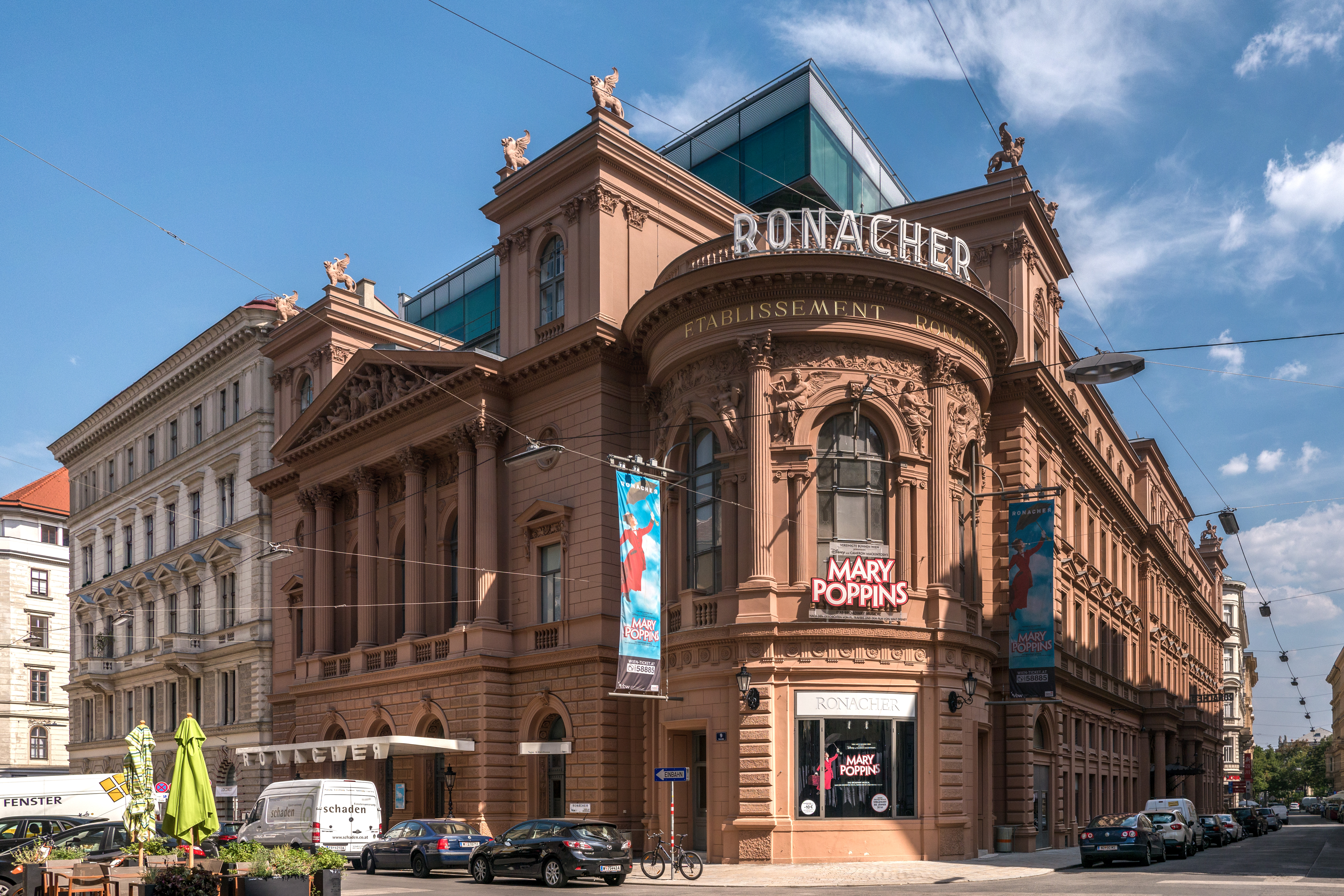
Ronacher in 2015

The Ronacher theater, originally Etablissement Ronacher, is a theater in the Innere Stadt district of Vienna, Austria.

Along with the Raimund Theater and the Theater an der Wien, it is run by the Vereinigte Bühnen Wien (VBW).

== History ==
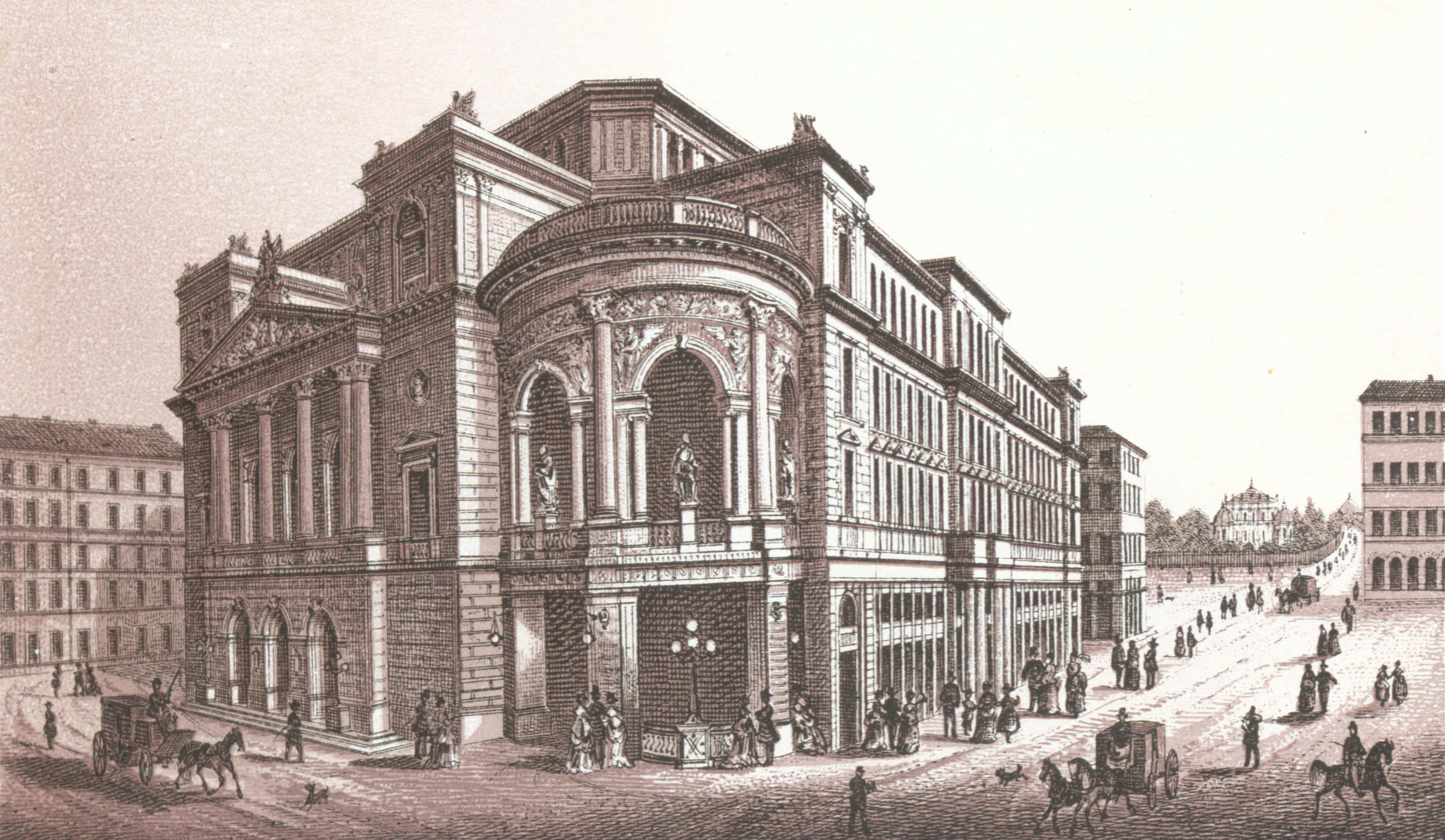
The Wiener Stadttheater (Vienna municipal theater) after its construction in 1872

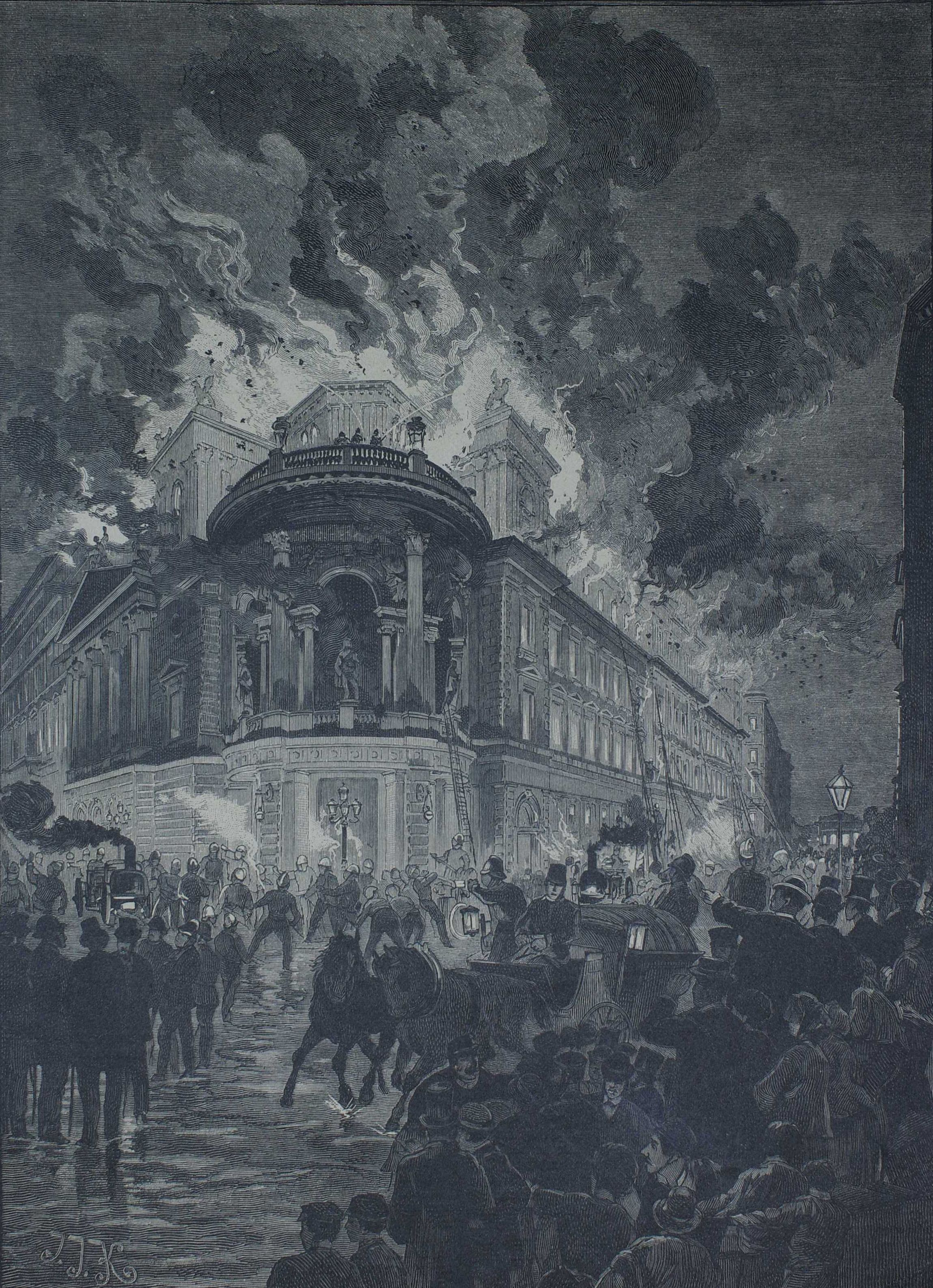
Fire at the theater 1884.

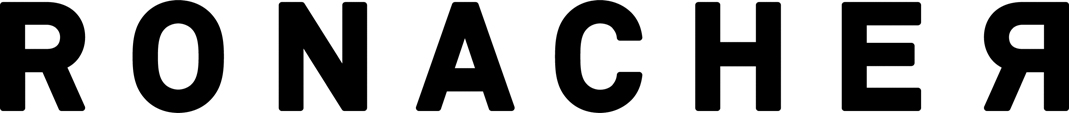
Ronacher Logo

It was initially built as the Wiener Stadttheater (Vienna municipal theatre) from 1871 to 1872 by the architects Ferdinand Fellner the Elder and Ferdinand Fellner for a private working group of the journalist Max Friedländer and the playwright and director Heinrich Laube.

The two wanted to build a bourgeois theatre that would compete with the imperial court theatres – without censorship. The house was opened on 15 September 1872 with Schiller's Demetrius in an adaptation of Laube. Twelve years after its opening, the house burned down on May 16, 1884. Since the building is not free on all four sides, a reconstruction as a theatre was not permitted according to the fire protection regulations that are now in force. In 1886 Anton Ronacher bought the ruins of the fire and had Ferdinand Fellner the Younger (who in the meantime had founded the office of Fellner & Helmer) build a concert and ball house on it from May 1887 to April 1888. The murals are by Eduard Veith. The main staircase was built with steps from Kaisersteinbruch. A large ballroom and a hotel were attached to the new variety theatre, and it was already able to use electric light, and included promenades and a conservatory.

The new Etablissement Ronacher was not a playhouse, but equipped with tables and chairs. During the performance, people were allowed to drink, eat and smoke. However, due to the poor economic situation, Ronacher later had to give up the house. From 1890 onwards, artists performed more frequently, which attracted more suburban populations and drove away the aristocracy. Later, the program was supplemented by revues, operettas, dance and singing performances. The house was rebuilt again and again and adapted to the needs of the modern variety business (1901, 1906 and continuously between 1907 and 1916; in each case by Ferdinand Fellner the Younger), especially around 1910 accompanied by the discussion whether, following the course of the times, the house should make the transition to classical spoken theatre. In the years 1909–1912, Gabor Steiner, the founder of Venice in Vienna, was the director of the theater. From 1928, the then Austrian radio, the RAVAG, was leased for a few years in parts of the Ronacher and broadcast its music programs from there: First, the so-called "Parisien" was converted into a studio, which was used together with ancillary rooms and the entire third floor. In 1930, RAVAG rented another one and a half floors and some single rooms in the building.

After the Anschluss in 1938, the theatre passed from its previous co-owner Samuel Schöngut to Bernhard Labriola through Aryanization. Schöngut was deported to the Litzmannstadt ghetto on 2 November 1941 and from there to the Auschwitz concentration camp on 16 August 1944, where he was murdered.

After World War II, the Ronacher was an alternative stage for the Burgtheater, which had been damaged by bombs, until 1955. Subsequently, vaudeville artists performed again, before the Austrian television used the premises for TV productions from 1960 onwards. In 1986, after ten years of vacancy, an operetta was performed again for the first time, this time, Cagliostro in Wien by Johann Strauss II. In 1987, the Vereinigte Bühnen Wien bought the house and staged the musical Cats and two operas. An architectural competition in 1987 resulted in a "deconstructivist" extension as the winning project. However, Coop Himmelblau's project became the target of fierce public criticism and was shelved in August 1991. In 2003, 2004 and 2008, the Ronacher hosted the award gala of the Nestroy Theatre Prize.

After several years as a guest performance hall for international productions and festive events, the Ronacher was expanded into a musical stage at a cost of 46.9 million euros. By mid-2008, the stage technology was modernized and the floor of the stage was lowered by two meters, which improved the view of the stage. The extension of the building by the architect Günther Domenig was carried out despite massive political and cityscape protection concerns.

Due to the COVID-19 pandemic, numerous performances had to be cancelled during Cats' season. During this time, the saleable seating capacity was first reduced to 75% and later to 50%. Since September 2021, tickets have been sold again at full capacity. Changes have been made to the play itself, such as the fact that the actors are no longer allowed to play in the auditorium as cats in order to be able to comply with the distance rules. The sequence as well as the choreography had to be adapted and changed – these changes served as a template for all Cats productions played worldwide.

The Ronacher has around 1000 seats and 40 standing places. The exact number of seats and standing room varies depending on the production (The Hunchback of Notre Dame currently has 1000 seats and 30 standing places).

== Musical world premieres ==
| Musical | Music and book | Premiere | Dernière | Shows / visitors | Additional information |
|---|---|---|---|---|---|
| Rock me Amadeus | Christian Struppeck | October 2023 | | | |
| Maria Theresia - The Musical | Deiter Falk; Paul Falk; Jonathan Zalter; Thomas Kahry | 10 October 2025 | | | |

== Other musical performances ==
| Musical | Music and book | Premiere | Dernière | Shows / visitors | Additional information |
|---|---|---|---|---|---|
| Cats | Andrew Lloyd Webber | 1988 | 24 September 1990 | over 2000 shows / 2.3 million visitors | |
| Cats | Andrew Lloyd Webber | 20 September 2019 | 26 June 2022 | 454 shows / 180,000 visitors | |
| Chicago | John Kander, Fred Ebb | | 21 April 1999 | | |
| Falco – A Cybershow | Joshua Sobol, Paulus Manker | 1 April 2000 | 26 November 2000 | | |
| The Producers | Mel Brooks | 30 June 2008 | 22 February 2009 | | German language world premiere |
| Spring Awakening | Michael Mayer, Bill T. Jones | 21 March 2009 | 30 May 2009 | | German language world premiere |
| Tanz der Vampire | Michael Kunze, Jim Steinman | 16 September 2009 | 25 June 2011 | | |
| Tanz der Vampire | Michael Kunze, Jim Steinman | 30 September 2017 | 27 June 2018 | 240 shows / 252,000 visitors | |
| Sister Act | Alan Menken, Glenn Slater | 15 September 2011 | 31. Dezember 2012 | | |
| Legally Blonde | Laurence O’Keefe, Nell Benjamin | 21 February 2013 | 20. Dezember 2013 | | |
| Der Besuch der alten Dame | Christian Struppeck, Moritz Schneider | 19 February 2014 | 29 June 2014 | 120 shows / 114.000 visitors | |
| Mary Poppins | Cameron Mackintosh, Disney | 1 October 2014 | 31. Januar 2016 | 371 shows / 366,000 visitors | German language world premiere |
| Evita | Andrew Lloyd Webber, Tim Rice | 9 March 2016 | 31. Dezember 2016 | 185 shows / 148,000 visitors | |
| Don Camillo and Peppone | Michael Kunze, Dario Farino | 27 January 2017 | 25 June 2017 | 117 shows | |
| Bodyguard | Alexander Dinelaris | 27 September 2018 | 30 June 2019 | 273 shows / 260,000 visitors | |
| The Hunchback of Notre Dame | Alan Menken, James Lapine, Stephen Schwartz | 8 October 2022 | June 2023 | | Austrian premiere |
