= Barbarella (musical) =

- Music: Dave Stewart
- Lyrics: Rudi Klausnitzer
- Book: Rudi Klausnitzer
- Basis: Barbarella comic
- Productions: 2004 Vienna

Barbarella is a 2004 musical based on the 1962 French science fiction comic book Barbarella, created by Jean-Claude Forest. The story centers on Barbarella, a young woman, who sets out to rescue her spaceship crew from an evil queen, often using her eroticism to achieve her goal.

The musical was written by Austrian intendant and journalist Rudi Klausnitzer with music by British composer Dave Stewart. It premiered in Vienna, Austria on 11 March 2004 and closed on 1 January 2005. The title role was played by Nina Proll. A cast recording was made, but only 100 copies were pressed for the public. These were distributed by lottery to members of the Vereinigte Bühnen Wien's "Musical Club".

== Synopsis ==
After her crew gets trapped inside a video game and can't return to reality Barbarella, warned of its dangers, insists on rescuing them and gets beamed to the planet Sogo. Upon her arrivel she discovers her crew has been left without memory and taken prisoners in a labyrinth surrounding the palace of the Black Queen. Her former commander Duran introduces her to the angel-like being Pygar, blinded during a prior escape attempt, who takes her to the palace. She is soon detected and taken to the Black Queen by Sun, the Queen's captain. Frustrated by a failed attempt to seduce Barbarella, the Black Queen locks her in a cage to be mauled by mechanical birds. Sun appears just in time to chase the birds away but Barbarella, believing it to be a ploy by the Queen, disarms and accidentally shoots him. In his last moments Sun reveals the Queen's weakness, her sleep. Alone and lost but still looking for a way to save her crew, Barbarella comes across Victor the robot who offers to protect her with his special shield if she spends one night with him. Afterwards Victor leads her to a secret passageway to the palace. On the other side Barbarella is immediatelly captured by the Queen's master locksmith with whom Victor was conspiring all along. Set on killing her the master locksmith puts her into his newest invention, a pleasure machine, but when he realises Barbarella could actually succeed in defeating the Black Queen he gives her a key to the Queen's dream room. There, Barbarella seduces the Black Queen who promises to give her everything she wants. She leads Barbarella to her torture chamber where Pygar is tied to a bed. The Black Queen asks Barbarella to stay and share him, instead Barbarella releases him, disarms the Queen and straps her in his place, forcing her to release her crew. Finally free the report of a revolution lead by the master locksmith that has broken out in the palace reaches them. The Black Queen asks them for help defeating the master locksmith but it's too late. In the meantime Victor and the master locksmith had prematurely ordered a poisonous monster to be shot and its lethal liquids destroy all of Sogo. All Pygar can do is fly them to safety. Asked by Barbarella why he also took the Black Queen he just responds: "Angels have no memory, Barbarella, we never look back."

== Background ==
In 1996 Klausnitzer met with Barbarella author Jean-Claude Forest in Paris to discuss the possibility of turning the comics into a musical. Forest saw potential and agreed under the condition that characters and dialogue are kept intact and a continuous story is told. After Forest's death in 1998 it took an additional two years for his son to release the rights. Imagining an innovative, rock-oriented musical, Klausnitzer brought on Stewart to write the music and got Michael Kunze to translate.

Initially Günter Krämer was set to direct but had to pull out, officially due to scheduling issues, and was replaced by Kim Duddy for direction and choreography.

== Characters ==
- Barbarella – Nina Proll
- Black Queen – Eva Maria Marold
- Sun/Master Locksmith – Drew Sarich
- Pygar - Mark Seibert
- Duran – Siegmar Tonk
- Victor – Andreas Bieber
- Two Beings – Fabian Aloise & Philip Ranson

== Songs ==
Act I

- Barbarella Superstar – Ensemble
- Long Ago, Far Away (Weit von hier, lang schon her) – Duran
- Weapons of a Girl (Waffen einer Frau) – Barbarella
- Prisoners (Gefangene) – Prisoners
- Are You an Angel (Bist du ein Engel?) – Barbarella & Pygar
- Beware (Du bist an einem böse Ort) – Two Beings
- Love For Free (Liebe umsonst) – Slupe, Barbarella, Ensemble
- Chosen (Auserwählt) – Sun
- Welcome to my World (Komm in meine Welt) – Black Queen
- Her Sleep (Ihr Schlaf) – Sun & Barbarella
- My Own Way (Find ich meinen Weg?) – Barbarella
- Victor the Robot (Victor) – Victor
- Power of the Black Queen (Die Macht der Schwarzen Königin) – Ensemble

Act II

- Entr'acte
- Fred Astaire (Ich wär so gern wie Fred Astaire) – Victor & Dancers
- My Pleasure Machine (Mein Lustapparat) – Master Locksmith
- Tonigh is the Night (Heute Nacht oder nie) – Barbarella
- Dream (Ein Traum) – Barbarella & Black Queen
- Play with Me (Spiel mit mir) – Black Queen
- A Real Conspiracy (Eine wirkliche Verschwörung) – Soldiers +
- Power of the Black Queen - reprise (Die Macht der Schwarzen Königin - reprise) – Ensemble
- An Angel has no Memory (Engel haben kein Gedächtnis) – Pygar, Barbarella, Black Queen & Ensemble

+ translated literally, no official English title released
