= International Music and Media Centre =

Non-profit organisation based in Austria

International Music + Media Centre
- Founded: 1961
- Founder: Wilfried Scheib, under the aegis of UNESCO
- Region served: International
- Website: www.imz.at

The International Music + Media Centre (IMZ) is an international non-profit organisation founded in 1961 by Wilfried Scheib under the aegis of UNESCO.

The IMZ is a global association for all those involved in any aspect of classical music, world music, jazz and contemporary music, ballet and contemporary dance in the audiovisual media.

Its more than 150 members include broadcasters; performing arts companies and venues; programme producers and distributors; record and DVD labels; cinema and new media specialists: all the participants in the creation and dissemination of music and dance in the media. Among their members are major international companies like the BBC, ZDF, 3sat, ARTE, NHK, ORF, the Metropolitan Opera New York, the Vienna State Opera, Salzburg Festival, C Major Entertainment GmbH, Deutsche Grammophon and WNET/THIRTEEN; the smallest are individual composers, choreographers, musicians or Music directors.

The IMZ organizes events and initiatives for its members (Avant Première Music + Media Market Berlin, Avant Première Screenings, Golden Prague Premieres and Pitching Sessions at the Golden Prague Festival and the European Broadcasting Union (EBU) et al.) to promote music and dance in and through audiovisual media. It is also active as an initiator and programme curator of open-air music (and dance) film festivals around the world: Vienna Music Film Festival NY, Vienna Music Film Festival Yekaterinburg, Vienna Music Film Festival Tokyo, Rathausplatz Filmfestival Vienna, Music Filmfestival Bucharest.

== Structure ==
The IMZ is based in Vienna, Austria and led by Max Beckham-Ortner, Secretary General since 2024. The Secretary General is appointed by the IMZ Board, which consists of 25 members elected for a three-year period.

President: Laetitia Huberti (RTBF – Belgian Public Radio & Television)

Vice presidents: Jason Charters (Riddle Films, Canada), Stephen James-Yeoman (BBC Arts and Classical Music, United Kingdom) and Arild Erikstad (NRK – Norwegian Broadcasting Corporation), Treasurer: Elmar Kruse (C Major Entertainment, Germany), Legal Counsel: Franz Patay (VBW International, Austria)

Additional board members: Wolfgang Bergmann (ARTE Deutschland TV GmbH, Germany), Agné Biliunaite (LRT – Lithuanian National Radio and Television, Lithuania), Ernst Buchrucker (Unitel, Germany), Daniel Celarec (RTV Slovenija, Slovenia), Ditte Feuk (SVT – Sveriges Television, Sweden), Frank Gerdes (ServusTV, Austria), Daniel Gorjão ( RTP – Rádio e Televisão de Portugal, Portugal), Mari Inamasu (NHK – Japan Broadcasting Corporation, Japan), Maria Kivinen (Yle – The Finnish Broadcasting Company, Finland), Ulrike Köstinger (Operabase, Denmark), Sandrine Laffont (EuroArts Music International, Germany), Rita Lombardi (RAI COM, Italy), Reiner Moritz (Poorhouse International Ltd., United Kingdom), Tomas Motl (Czech Television, Czechia), François Roussillon (François Roussillon et Associés, France), Erwin Stürzer (Naxos Audiovisual Division, Germany), Martin Traxl (ORF – Austrian Broadcasting Corporation, Austria), Maria Willer (3B-Produktion, Germany).

Honorary Members: Daniel Barenboim, Pierre Boulez †, Alfred Brendel, Adrienne Clarkson, Anne Teresa De Keersmaeker, Mats Ek, Juan Diego Flórez, Daniel Hope, Bill T. Jones, Jonas Kaufmann, Lang Lang, Brian Large, Anne-Sophie Mutter, Neil Shicoff, Anne Sofie von Otter.

== Related partner organisations ==
- UNESCO
- IMC
- European Music Council
- EBU
- Classical:Next
- Emmy
- International Classical Music Awards
