= Vereinigte Bühnen Wien =

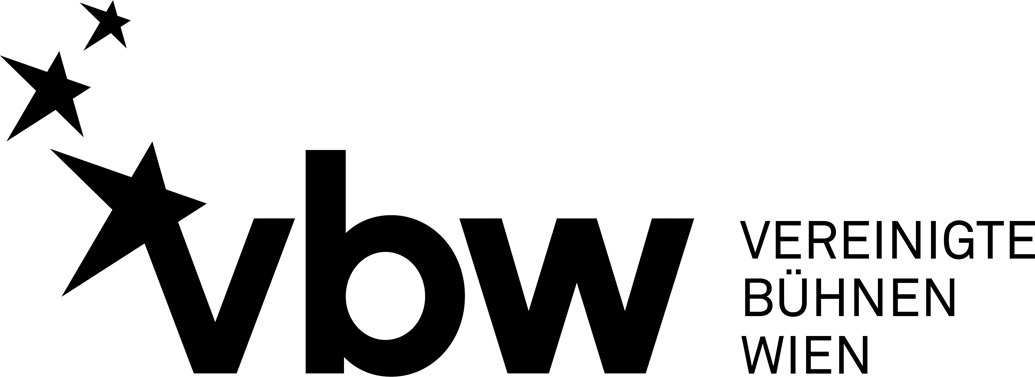
Vereinigte Bühnen Wien

Vereinigte Bühnen Wien (VBW), or United Stages Vienna, is a musical production company based in Vienna, Austria which produced several own musicals that were very successful.

It also owns and/or operates four theaters: the Theater an der Wien, Raimund Theater, Ronacher, and the Kammeroper.

The sole shareholder is Wien Holding GmbH.

== Original musical productions ==
This is a list of productions that were originally produced by Vereinigte Bühnen Wien. Some of the productions were later produced by other companies.

- Freudiana (by Eric Woolfson, Lida Winiewicz and Brian Brolly)

- Austria (world premiere): Theater an der Wien (VBW), Vienna (December 19th, 1990 - April 18th, 1992)

- Elisabeth (written by Michael Kunze, composed by Sylvester Levay)

- Austria (world premiere): Theater an der Wien (VBW), Vienna (September 3rd, 1992 - April 1998)
- Japan: Osaka (1996)
- Hungary: Szeged (1996)
- Hungary: Budapest (1996)
- Sweden: Karlstad (1999)
- Netherlands: Fortis Circustheater (SE), The Hague (1999-2001)
- Germany: Colosseum Theater (SE), Essen (March 2001 - June 2003)
- Hungary: Budapest (2002-2003)
- Austria (revised version): Theater an der Wien (VBW), Vienna (October 1st, 2003 - December 4th, 2005)
- Germany: Apollo Theater (SE), Stuttgart (April 2005 - September 17th, 2006)
- Finland: Turku (since September 23rd, 2005)

- Tanz der Vampire (Dance of the Vampires) (written by Michael Kunze, composed by Jim Steinman)

- Austria (world premiere): Raimund Theater (VBW), Vienna (October 4th, 1997 - January 15th, 2000)
- Germany: Musical Hall (now called Apollo Theater, Stella Entertainment AG, taken over by SE in 2002), Stuttgart (March 31st 2000 - August 31st, 2003)
- United States: Minskoff Theatre, Broadway, New York (October 18th, 2002 - January 25th, 2003)

Instead of adapting the successful Austrian version, the producers decided to have it rewritten. It turned out to become a big flop.

- Germany: Neue Flora (SE), Hamburg (December 16th, 2003 - January 22nd, 2006)
- Poland: Roma Teatr Muzyczny, Warsaw (October 8th, 2005 - )
- Germany: Theater des Westens, Berlin (December 2006)
- Hungary: Magyar Theater, Budapest PS Produkció Ltd (June 30th, 2007)
- Estonia: Tallinn
- Finland: Seinäjoki (2011), Helsinki (2016)
- Japan: Tokyo
- Belgium: Antwerp (2010)
- Czech Republic: GoJa Music Hall Prague (2017)

- Mozart! (written by Michael Kunze, composed by Silvester Levay)

- Austria (world premiere): Theater an der Wien (VBW), Vienna (October 2nd, 1999 - May 7th, 2001)
- Germany: Neue Flora (SE), Hamburg (September 21st, 2001 - June 30th, 2002)
- Japan: Tokyo (2002)
- Japan: Osaka (2002)
- Hungary: Budapest (March 2003 - )
- Japan: Osaka (2005)
- Sweden: Karlstad (2005)
- Czech Republic: City Theatre Brno (2009)

- Wake Up (written and composed by Rainhard Fendrich, music arranged by Harold Faltermeyer)

- Austria (world premiere): Raimund Theater (VBW), Vienna (September 29th, 2002 - January 1, 2004)

- Barbarella (written by Rudi Klausnitzer, composed by Dave Stewart, based on the work and character by Jean-Claude Forest)

- Austria (world premiere): Raimund Theater (VBW), Vienna (March 11th, 2004 - January 1, 2005)

- Rebecca (written by Michael Kunze, composed by Sylvester Levay)

- Austria (world premiere): Raimund Theater (VBW), Vienna (since September 28th, 2006)
- Finland: Helsinki (2009), Kouvola (2010)
- Czech Republic: Jiří Myron Theatre (NDM), Ostrava (since March 9th, 2017)

- Rudolf (written by Jack Murphy, Phoebe Hwang, and Nan Knighton, composed by Frank Wildhorn)

- Hungary (world premiere): alternating between the Operett Színház in Budapest and the open-air theatre in Szeged since May 26, 2006.

- Schikaneder (written by Christian Struppeck, composed by Stephen Schwartz)

- Austria (world premiere): Raimund Theater (VBW), Vienna (September 30, 2016 - June 21, 2017)

- I am from Austria (written by Titus Hoffmann and Christian Struppeck, songs by Rainhard Fendrich)

- Austria (world premiere): Raimund Theater (VBW), Vienna (September 16th, 2017 - June 16th, 2019)
- Japan: Takarazuka Grand Theater, Osaka & Tokyo (2019)

== All musical productions ==
This list contains musical productions played in the VBW's theaters Theater an der Wien (TadW), Raimund Theater (RT) and Etablissement Ronacher (ER) in alphabetical order. Current and future productions are highlighted.

- A Chorus Line (RT, 1987-1988)
- Anatevka (TadW, 1997)
- Barbarella (RT, 2004-2005)
- The Bodyguard (ER, 2018-2019)
- Cats (TadW, 1983-1988; ER, 1988-1990, 2019-2022)
- Chicago (TadW, 1998-1999; ER, 1999)
- Die Schöne und das Biest (Beauty and the Beast) (RT, 1995-1997)
- Das Phantom der Oper (The Phantom of the Opera) (TadW, 1988-1990; RT, 1990-1993)
- Elisabeth (TadW, 1992-1998, 2003-2005, RT 2012-2013)
- Freudiana (TadW, 1990-1992)
- Frühlings Erwachen (ER 2009)
- Grease (RT, 1994-1995)
- Hair (RT, 2001-2002)
- I am from Austria (RT, 2017-2019)
- Ich war noch niemals in New York (RT, 2010-2012)
- Jekyll & Hyde (TadW, 2001-2003)
- Joseph and the Amazing Technicolor Dreamcoat (RT, 2000-2001)
- Kuss der Spinnenfrau (Kiss of the Spider Woman) (RT, 1993-1994)
- Les Misérables (RT, 1988-1990)
- Mozart! (TadW, 1999-2001)
- Rebecca (RT, premiered on September 28, 2006)
- Rudolf (RT, 2009-2010)
- Romeo & Julia (Roméo et Juliette, de la Haine à l'Amour) (RT, 2005-2006)
- Sister Act (ER 2011-)
- Rocky Horror Show (RT, 1993)
- Tanz der Vampire (RT, 1997-2000, ER 2009-2011)
- The Producers (ER, 2008-2009)
- Wake Up (RT, 2002-2004)

== See also ==
- Elisabeth (musical)
- Franz Patay - CEO of VBW
- Stage Entertainment (abbreviated: SE)
- Tanz der Vampire
