= Patay (cake) =

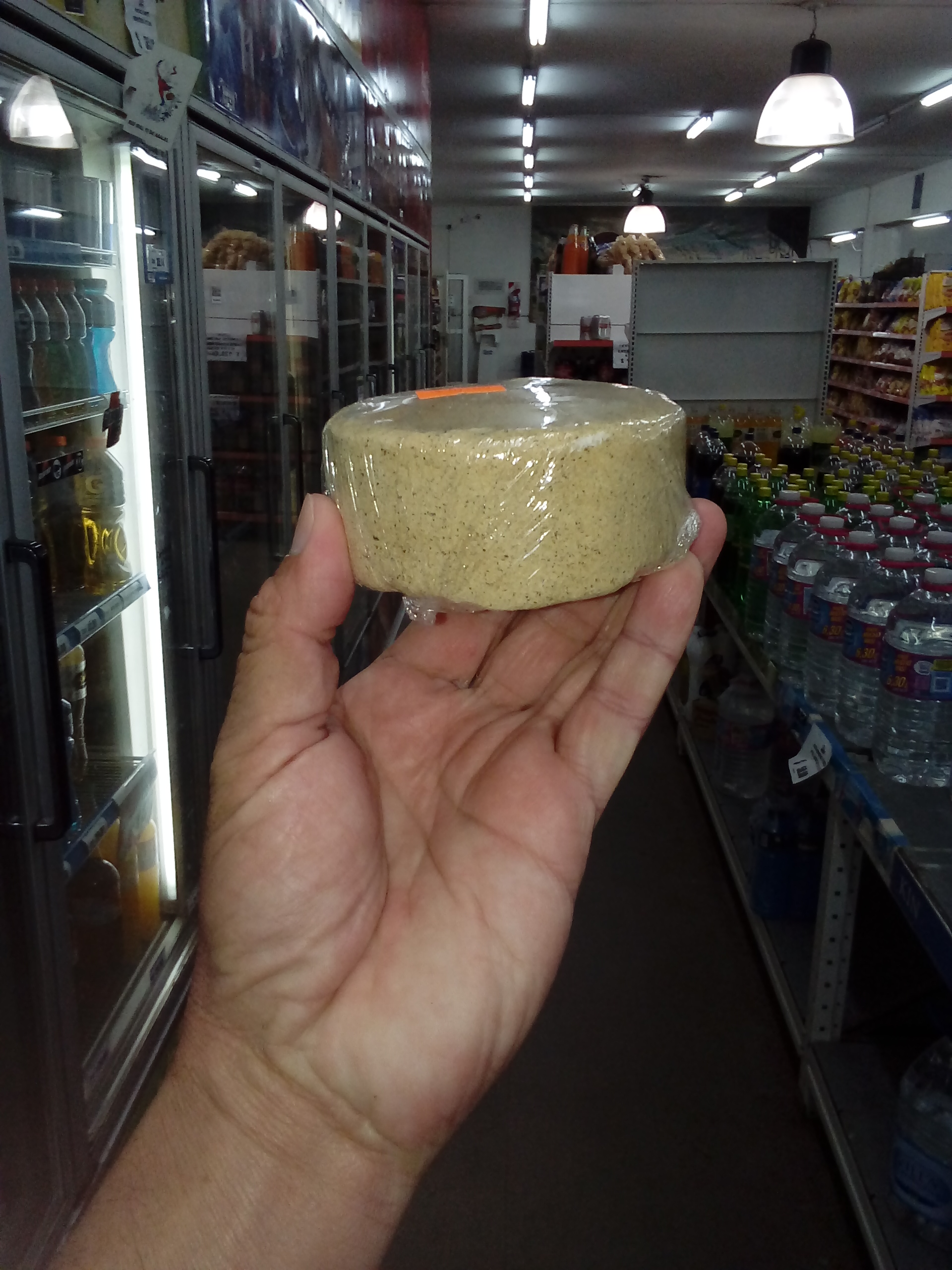
Patay sample at a grocery store in Chamical, Argentina.

Patay is a dry cake made from algarrobo flour. It is a traditional food of the indigenous peoples of northwestern Argentina and Paraguay, and is currently consumed by the population of these regions. This food is noted for its high nutritional value, as it is energizing, rich in protein, minerals, and vitamins, and low in fat.

== See also ==
- Algarrobina
