= Franz Patay =

Austrian arts administrator (born 1961)

Franz Patay (born 1961 in Vienna) is an Austrian arts administrator, the former Rector of the Music and Arts University of the City of Vienna and CEO of the theatrical company Vereinigte Bühnen Wien.

== Biography ==
As the son of a musical family (his father Georg was a viola player in the Vienna Philharmonic Orchestra for over 40 years) Franz Patay's interests were encouraged from a young age. After leaving school he began studies in law at the University of Vienna. In January 1986 Franz Patay graduated as a doctor of jurisprudence. At the same time, he studied arts and cultural management at the College of Music and Performing Arts Vienna from October 1994 to February 2017.

Franz Patay, who holds a doctorate in law, was Secretary General and executive director of the IMZ – International Music + Media Centre Vienna since October 1994. From February 2014 until August 2018 he held the post of Rector of the Music and Arts University of the City of Vienna. In June 2014 he was awarded the honorary title of Professor. In October 2016 he was appointed CEO of the Vereinigte Bühnen Wien (VBW). Patay is married with one daughter.

== Career ==
=== University administration ===
In 1987 Patay was appointed Vice-rector (administrative director) of the then College of Music and Performing Arts Vienna. In this office, which he held until 1994, his principal responsibilities lay in the legal and organisational management of the university; the main focus of his work were the departments of voice and stage performance, film and television, as well as acting and directing the Max Reinhardt Seminar. On 1 February 2014 he returned to university administration as Chief Executive of the Konservatorium Wien GmbH; he also took over the role of Rector of the Music and Arts University of the City of Vienna until August 2018. In September 2018 the former Viennese city council for arts, science and sports Andreas Mailath-Pokorny assumed this position.

=== International networking in the music and media industry ===
Patay has headed the IMZ – International Music + Media Centre Vienna as Secretary General since 1994. The IMZ is an international non-profit organisation which was founded by Wilfried Scheib in 1961 under the auspices of UNESCO.

=== Organising large-scale cultural projects ===
Franz Patay's profile as an arts administrator is distinguished by the high number and variety of the individual projects carried out as part of large-scale international cultural events. As Chief Executive of the Vienna Mozart Year 2006, Franz Patay was responsible for overall coordination and implementation alongside Peter Marboe as artistic director. Together with Walter Reicher, Franz Patay was appointed to the executive board of the Haydn-Year 2009, where he was responsible for financial planning and programme coordination.

=== Kunsthalle and Kunst Haus Wien ===
In 2012 he took over the management of the Kunsthalle Wien and was the first Chief Executive of the Kunsthalle Wien GmbH. From 2007 to his appointment as Rector of the Konservatorium Wien University, he was also Chief Executive and Director of the Kunst Haus Wien. During his tenure, several major exhibitions were shown, including Annie Leibovitz, René Burri, H. R. Giger and Saul Leiter. At Patay's invitation, Paul McCartney attended the opening in 2013 of a retrospective of the deceased photographer Linda McCartney at the Kunst Haus Wien.

=== Vereinigte Bühnen Wien ===
In October 2016 Franz Patay succeeded Thomas Drozda as CEO of the Vereinigte Bühnen Wien, who has been appointed to the federal minister of culture.

=== Other activities ===
Since 2000, Patay has been a member of the International Council of the National Academy of Television Arts and Sciences, New York, the body responsible for the International Emmy Awards. Invitations to teach and guest lectures have taken him e.g. to the International Center for Culture & Management (ICCM) in Salzburg. In addition, Patay was on the board of the UNESCO International Music Council in Paris for six years and was chair of the advisory board of the Austrian Music Council (Österreichisches Musikrat – ÖMR) for two years. Paul Hertel was appointed as his successor at the ÖMR. In May 2016 Patay was elected into the board of trustees of the Alban Berg Foundation. Also in 2016 Patay was appointed to the general assembly of the Vienna Symphony.

== Honours ==
On 12 June 2014 Patay was awarded the honorary title of Professor by the President of Austria. The laudatory speech was given by Elisabeth Freismuth, Rector of the University of Music and Performing Arts Graz since October 2014.
