= Wienzeile =

Street in Vienna, Austria

Coordinates: 48°11′37″N 16°21′16″E

The Wienzeile ('Vienna Row') is a street in Vienna, which originated in the course of the regulation of the Vienna River between 1899 and 1905 along the river's banks. It is divided into the Rechte Wienzeile (Right Vienna Row) and the Linke Wienzeile (Left Vienna Row).

- The Rechte Wienzeile runs through the Viennese districts of Wieden, Margareten, and Meidling and is so named after its position on the right bank of the Vienna River.
- The Linke Wienzeile, located on the left bank of the Vienna River, runs through the Viennese districts of Mariahilf and Rudolfsheim-Fünfhaus.

== History ==
Before the regulation of the Vienna River, the Rechte Wienzeile was called Wienstraße in the fourth district, Flussgasse in the fifth district, An der Wien, and Wienstraße. The Linke Wienzeile had various names in the sixth district, first Am Wienufer as well as Ufergasse, later Magdalenenstraße and Wienstraße.

Construction of the first pavilions of the Naschmarkt, Vienna's popular fruit and vegetable market which lies between the Rechte and the Linke Wienzeile, began in 1902.

Of architectural significance on the Linke Wienzeile are buildings No. 38 and 40, apartment house complexes designed by Otto Wagner which feature striking Secessionist décor.

== Geography ==
The U-Bahn line U4 runs along the entirety of the Wienzeile's length on the stretch of the former Wiener Stadtbahn.

In the outer districts of Hietzing and Penzing, the extended Wienzeile is called Hietzinger Kai as well as Hadikgasse.

== Attractions ==
- Wienzeilenhäuser by Otto Wagner
- Viennese Naschmarkt
- Theater an der Wien
- Vienna Secession
- Karlsplatz Stadtbahn Station
- Vorwärts building

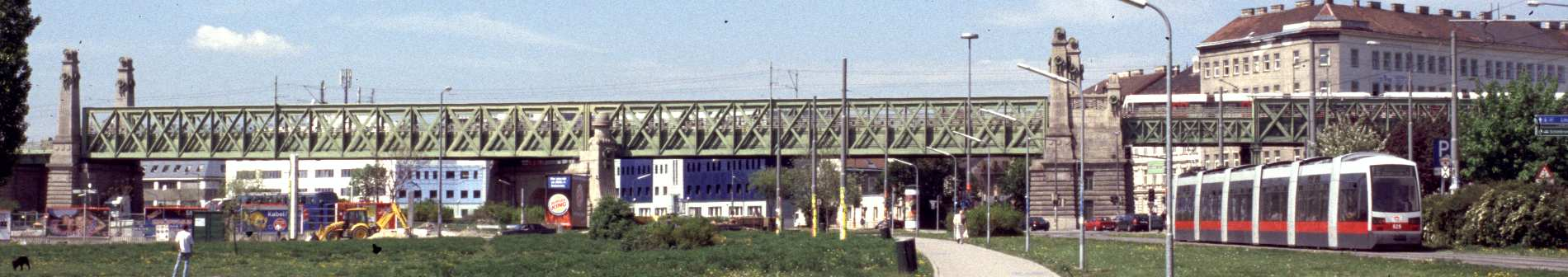
Bridge by Otto Wagner of the former Wiener Stadtbahn over the Linke Wienzeile (today the U6)
