= Naschmarkt =

Square and market in Vienna, Austria

Coordinates: 48°11′56″N 16°21′49″E

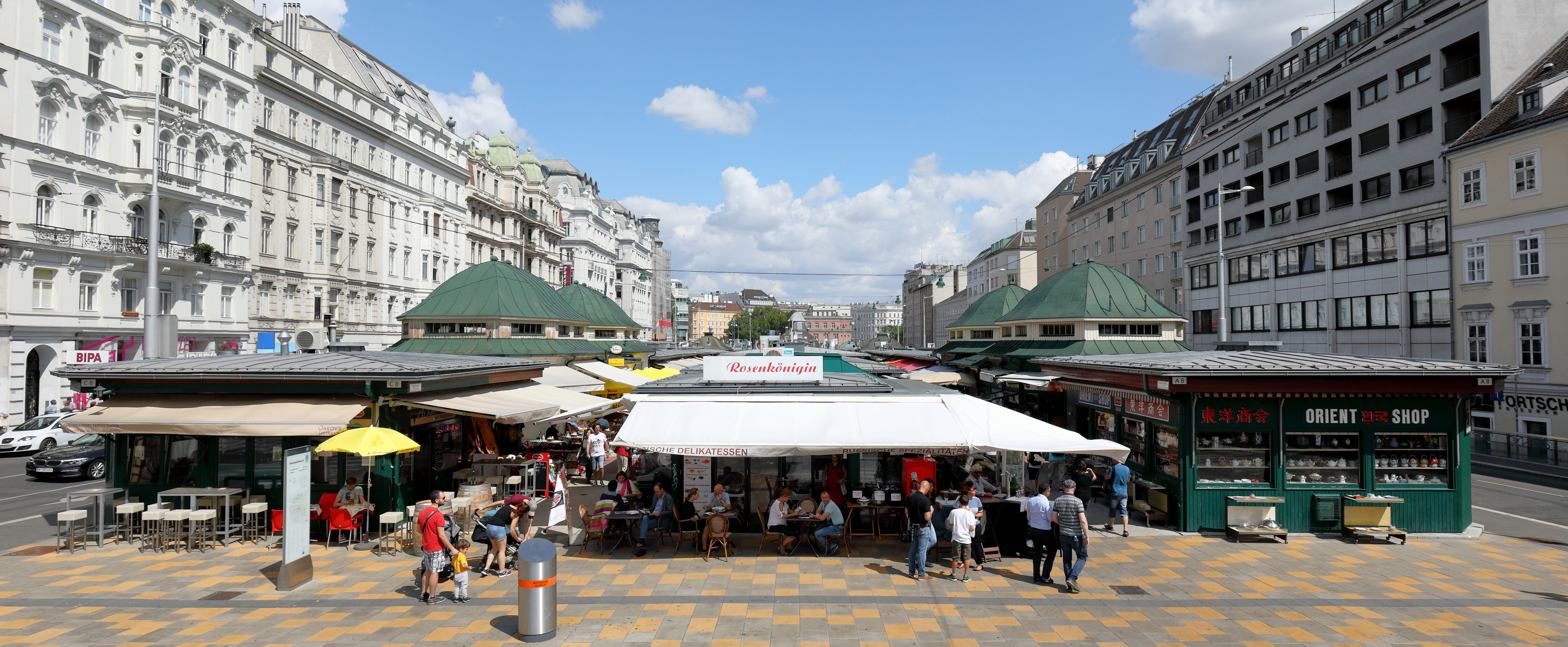
Typical market stall at the Naschmarkt in Vienna, Austria

The Naschmarkt is a popular fruit and vegetable market in Vienna. Located at the Wienzeile over the Wien River, it is about 1.5 kilometres (0.93 mi) long. Originally known as Aschenmarkt, it started to be called the Naschmarkt around 1820.

Nowadays, one can buy fresh fruit and vegetables from around the world, exotic herbs, cheese, baked goods such as bread, kaiser rolls, torte, meats, and seafood. There are also many small restaurants which offer e.g. sushi, kebab, seafood, traditional Viennese food such as Kaiserschmarrn or Palatschinken (rolled up crepes) and stalls which offer clothes and accessories. Since 1977, the market extends further along the Wienzeile to an adjacent area every Saturday, when a flea market takes place there.

The atmosphere of the Naschmarkt is famous far beyond the borders of Vienna, and large numbers of tourists visit the market every year.

== History ==
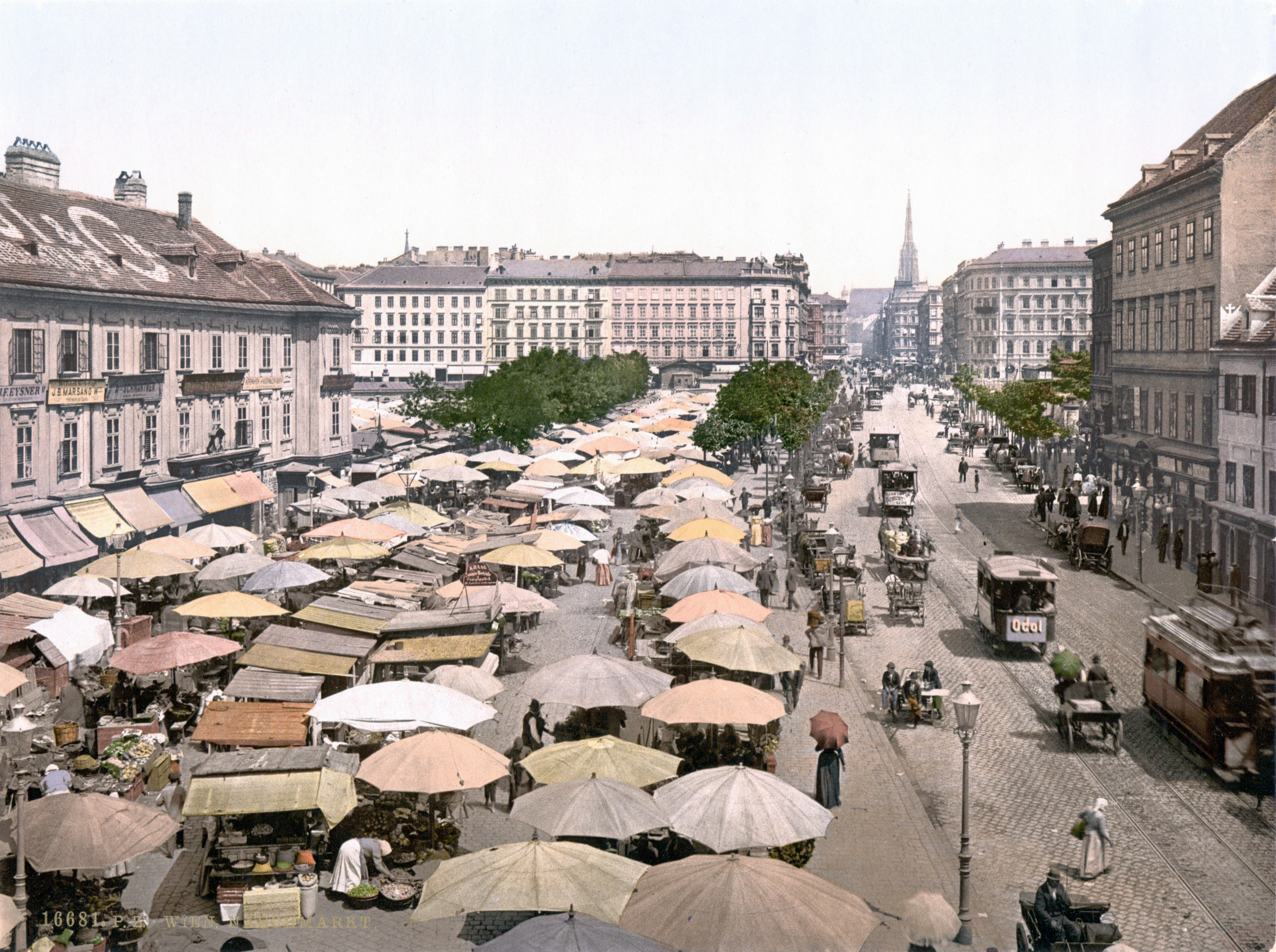
The Naschmarkt around 1900

The Aschenmarkt has existed since the 16th century.

In 1780, the market was moved to the top of present-day Wiedner Hauptstraße. There are several possible explanations for the name "Aschenmarkt". Milk was sold in buckets called "Asch" because they were made of ash trees. The site of the old milk market itself was a former landfill for ash and waste. Another explanation is that the ash itself was important because it was used to clean crockery.

From 1793 onwards, all fruits and vegetables brought to Vienna with carts had to be sold there, while goods arriving on the Danube were sold elsewhere.

The first pavilions of the Naschmarkt over the Wien River were built in 1902.

== See also ==
- Marketplace
- Retail
