= Silver Convention discography =

- Studio albums: 5
- Compilation albums: 5
- Singles: 19

The discography of German Eurodisco group Silver Convention consists of 5 studio albums, 5 compilation albums, and 19 released singles.

== Albums ==
=== Studio albums ===
| Title | Album details | Peak chart positions | | | | | | | | | Certifications |
| Title | Album details | GER | AUS | CAN | JPN | NOR | SWE | SPA | US | US R&B | Certifications |
|---|---|---|---|---|---|---|---|---|---|---|---|
| Silver Convention (aka Save Me) | Released: May 1975; Label: Jupiter; Formats: LP, MC, 8-track | 48 | 18 | 11 | 64 | — | 49 | 5 | 10 | 1 | ARIA: 2× Gold; RIAA: Gold |
| Get Up and Boogie (aka Silver Convention) | Released: March 1976; Label: Jupiter; Formats: LP, MC, 8-track | 19 | 15 | 3 | 49 | 15 | 25 | — | 13 | 9 | ARIA: Gold; MC: Gold |
| Madhouse | Released: November 1976; Label: Jupiter; Formats: LP, MC, 8-track | — | 16 | — | — | — | 41 | — | 65 | 47 | |
| Summernights (aka Golden Girls) | Released: May 1977; Label: Jupiter; Formats: LP, MC, 8-track | — | — | 86 | — | — | 20 | — | 71 | — | |
| Love in a Sleeper | Released: February 1978; Label: Jupiter; Formats: LP, MC, 8-track | — | 90 | — | — | — | — | — | 208 | — | |
"—" denotes releases that did not chart or were not released in that territory.

=== Compilation albums ===
| Title | Album details | Peak chart positions | | | | Certifications |
| Title | Album details | AUS | NOR | SWE | UK | Certifications |
|---|---|---|---|---|---|---|
| Success | Released: April 1976; Label: Jupiter; Formats: LP, MC | 36 | 11 | 16 | — | IFPIHK: Platinum |
| Greatest Hits | Released: June 1977; Label: Magnet/Warwick; Formats: LP, MC | — | — | — | 34 | |
| The Best of Silver Convention | Released: 1978; Label: Hammard; Formats: LP, MC; Australia-only release | 46 | — | — | — | |
| The Best of Silver Convention: Get Up and Boogie | Released: December 1994; Label: Janus; Formats: CD | — | — | — | — | |
| Get Up and Boogie with Silver Convention – The Greatest Hits | Released: September 1998; Label: Music Club; Formats: CD | — | — | — | — | |
"—" denotes releases that did not chart or were not released in that territory.

== Singles ==
| Title | Year | Peak chart positions | | | | | | | | | | Album |
| Title | Year | GER | AUS | BEL (FL) | BEL (WA) | ITA | NL | SPA | UK | US | US Dance | Album |
|---|---|---|---|---|---|---|---|---|---|---|---|---|
| "Save Me" | 1974 | 33 | 83 | 9 | 5 | 44 | 8 | 14 | 30 | 103 | 10 | Silver Convention |
| "Always Another Girl" | 1975 | — | — | 29 | 39 | — | 19 | — | — | — | 6 | Silver Convention |
| "Fly, Robin, Fly" | 1975 | 3 | 11 | 3 | 5 | 3 | 8 | 1 | 28 | 1 | 1 | Silver Convention |
| "Get Up and Boogie" | 1976 | 13 | 19 | 12 | 10 | 5 | 6 | 6 | 7 | 2 | 5 | Get Up and Boogie |
| "San Francisco Hustle" (New Zealand and Mexico-only release) | 1976 | — | — | — | — | — | — | — | — | — | — | Get Up and Boogie |
| "Tiger Baby" (c/w No, No, Joe) (UK-only release) | 1976 | — | — | — | — | — | — | — | 41 | — | — | Silver Connection |
| "No, No, Joe" | 1976 | 49 | — | — | — | 45 | — | 18 | — | 60 | 14 | Get Up and Boogie |
| "Fancy Party" | 1976 | — | — | — | — | — | — | — | — | — | — | Madhouse |
| "Everybody's Talking 'Bout Love" | 1976 | — | — | — | — | — | — | — | 25 | — | — | Madhouse |
| "Dancing in the Aisles (Take Me Higher)" | 1976 | — | — | — | — | — | — | — | — | 102 | — | Madhouse |
| "Telegram" | 1977 | 27 | — | 26 | 45 | — | — | — | 57 (Note: Chart position is from the official UK "Breakers List".) | 103 | — | Summernights |
| "Summernights" (France-only release) | 1977 | — | — | — | — | — | — | — | — | — | — | Summernights |
| "Hotshot" | 1977 | — | — | — | — | — | — | — | — | — | — | Summernights |
| "The Boys from Liverpool" | 1977 | — | — | — | — | — | — | — | — | — | — | Non-album single |
| "Spend the Night with Me" | 1978 | — | — | — | — | — | — | — | — | — | 10 | Love in a Sleeper |
| "Love in a Sleeper" (Scandinavia-only release) | 1978 | — | — | — | — | — | — | — | — | — | — | Love in a Sleeper |
| "Café au Lait" | 1979 | — | — | — | — | — | — | — | — | — | — | Non-album single |
| "Get It Up" | 1981 | — | — | — | — | — | — | — | — | — | — | Love in a Sleeper |
| "World Hits of Silver Convention" | 1981 | — | — | — | — | — | — | — | — | — | — | Non-album single |
"—" denotes releases that did not chart or were not released in that territory.
