= Lady Bump (album) =

Studio album by Penny McLean
- Released: 1975
- Genre: Disco
- Length: 35:19
- Label: Jupiter
- Producer: Michael Kunze

Penny McLean chronology
Lady Bump (1975)	Penny (1977)

Lady Bump is the debut album of Austrian-born singer Penny McLean. It was released in 1975, while Penny was part of the group Silver Convention. The album was released months after her successful single "Lady Bump", and three more songs were released as singles and charted worldwide. The album managed to chart in 3 countries. This is the only McLean's album to be released in CD format, it was released in 1992 in Germany. McLean's two other albums were released without the label or the singer permission.

== Background and production ==
In 1975 McLean made part of the German group Silver Convention, a group that also included Linda G. Thompson and Ramona Wulf and had hits such as "Save Me" and "Fly, Robin, Fly". McLean planned to do an album as a solo artist and release as the first single the song "Lady Bump". The album was produced by Michael Kunze and arranged by Sylvester Levay.

== Singles ==
The first single of the album was the song "Lady Bump" which backed with "The Lady Bumps On" and was released on the Jupiter record label cat - 16 069 AT in June 1975. By November 1975, the track bw "The Lady Bumps On" was rated # 14 in the New York discos. In January 1976, it was #8 on the Cash box pop singles charts. In July 1976, "Lady Bump" #7 in Australia's 2S Music Survey. The single itself sold 3 million copies. The second single of the album was the song 1-2-3-4... Fire! which was Top 20 in 5 charts around the world. In October 1976, her single "Devil Eyes" was released on the Ariola label and managed to appear in Sweden and West Germany charts.

== Critical reception ==
Professional ratings
Review scores
Source	Rating
Allmusic	2.5/5 stars

In a review published by RPM, the magazine described Lady Bump as a release that mixes an energetic "burner" in the title track with more conventional material, noting Penny McLean as a singer "wailing out the sounds of sticky-sweet chocolate" and referring to her version of "Smoke Gets in Your Eyes" as an "ol' standard eye-glazer".

Justin Kantor from AllMusic says that unfortunately the album "primarily consists of material that is derivative of its hit single, but never quite stands on its own." He also said that the Michael Kunze's smooth production is "indeed pleasant and there are particularly enjoyable moments to be found in "Big Bad Boy" and "Devil Eyes,"" but according to him "overall, the hooks are not as strong and McLean doesn't sound quite as enthused."

Robert Christgau in his review for Silver Convention's album Get Up and Boogie argued that "they should have borrowed "Lady Bump" and "Big Bad Boy" from Penny McLean, whose bland vocalizing is best buried in the mix, as it is here, rather than showcased on a "solo" album."

== Track listing ==
Side one
No.	Title	Writer(s)	Length
1.	"Lady Bump"	Sylvester Levay; Michael Kunze	3:42
2.	"Devil Eyes"	S. Levay; M. Kunze	3:45
3.	"The Wizard Bump"	S. Levay; M. Kunze	3:32
4.	"The A-B-C Of Love"	S. Levay; M. Kunze	3:20
5.	"1-2-3-4... Fire!"	S. Levay; M. Kunze	3:04

Side two
No.	Title	Writer(s)	Length
6.	"Big Bad Boy"	S. Levay; M. Kunze	4:40
7.	"Baby Doll"	S. Levay; M. Kunze	4:05
8.	"Smoke Gets In Your Eyes"	Otto Harbach, Jerome Kern	6:03
9.	"I'm Knocking (At Your Door)"	S. Levay; M. Kunze	3:00

== Charts ==
Chart (1975/76)	Peak position
Australia (Kent Music Report)	12
Canada Top Albums/CDs (RPM)	47
Swedish Albums (Sverigetopplistan)	3
US Top R&B/Hip Hop Albums	59
