= Rhonda Heath =

- Born: 19 July 1955 (age 71); New York
- Occupations: Singer; Actress
- Musical career
- Genres: Pop; Disco; Funk; Pop rock

Rhonda Heath (born 19 July 1955) is an American-German singer and actress, notable for being a member of the Silver Convention and La Mama. Heath went on to launch a successful solo career in Germany and also starred in many German TV shows.

== Life and career ==
Rhonda Heath began playing the piano at the age of five. She later studied music education at Adrian College in Michigan. Heath also went on to take acting lessons.

During an appearance in a New York music club in the summer of 1976, she was discovered by Sylvester Levay and Michael Kunze, who were looking for someone to replace Linda G. Thompson in their successful disco group — Silver Convention. Heath was hired and traveled to Munich, West Germany later that summer to record the Madhouse album. The following year in 1977, Heath and the two other members of the group represented Germany with the song "Telegram" at the Eurovision Song Contest in London. She would go on to record two other albums with the group — Summernights and Love in a Sleeper — before they split in 1979.

After the breakup in 1979, Heath released her first solo single with Kunze's Karma music label. In 1981, she won third place with her song "Forever and More" at the Seoul Song Festival in South Korea. By 1983, she had released more singles and two albums. In 1985 she replaced Judy Cheeks in the trio, La Mama. The trio broke up later that same year. Heath has also worked as a guest and studio singer for many other well-known artists, such as La Bionda and Boney M. Later, she took part again in the Eurovision Song Contest in 1985 with Gary Lux, and 1994 with Mekado as a backing singer.

Heath also pursued her acting career, as she starred in many ARD shows, such as Pfarrerin Lenau

She married a German citizen in 1990 and continues to live in Munich today.
