= Jacqueline Nemorin =

British musician

Jacqueline Nemorin (known professionally as Jackie Carter and Né-Mo-Rin) is a Mauritian-born British musician, composer and producer. She was one of the voices and members of the 1970s Silver Convention project.

== Life ==
Jacqueline Nemorin was born to a pianist (her father) and a dancer (her mother) and later moved to London, England with her family. In the 1970s she moved to Germany, where she took on the pseudonym "Jackie Carter".

As a member of the Veit Marvos Red Point Orchestra from 1972 to 1974, she performed on stage with the then-unknown Donna Summer. In addition, she began to work as a guest and studio singer for various artists.

In 1974, she was chosen to sing in Michael Kunze and Sylvester Levay's Silver Convention, which would go on to be successful worldwide with their disco songs Fly, Robin, Fly and Get Up and Boogie. Jackie Carter was the only one of the session musicians to perform live with the group. Later in 1975, she stopped performing with the Silver Convention and was replaced by Penny McLean. Afterwards, she launched a successful solo career. Frank Diez, which would go on to be her first husband, produced her solo albums "Treat Me Like a Woman" (1976) and "Ruby Shoes" (1979).

In 1990, she met Toby Gad, with whom she entered into a musical and private relationship. Since then, she has been working under her real name and the pseudonym Né-Mo-Rin. Together with Toby Gad, she began to write and produce songs and even moved to New York with him. Around the year 2000, Carter moved back to Munich, where she worked with Frankie Chinasky. She has been living in London again since 2012.

== Discography ==
Albums

- 1976: Treat Me Like a Woman (as Jackie Carter; Atlantic)
- 1979: Ruby Shoes (as Jackie Carter;Global Records & Tapes)
- 1992: Creole Dance (as Nemorin; MCI)
- 1995: Mission of Love (ls Nemorin; Electrola)

Singles

- 1976: Treat Me Like a Woman (as Jackie Carter; Big Tree / Atlantic / Hispavox)
- 1976: Just Like Lightning (as Jackie Carter; Atlantic)
- 1977: Unsere Welt will immer nur Gewinner sehen (as Jackie Carter; Telefunken)
- 1978: You Keep Me Hangin’ On (as Jackie Carter; RCA Victor)
- 1978: Paint It Black (as Jackie Carter; Big Mouth)
- 1979: Stay for the Night (as Jackie Carter; auch Maxi-Single; Global Records & Tapes)
- 1985: Heat of the Night (as Jackie Carter; F1 Team)
- 1988: A Ci Lelao (as Nemorin; auch Maxi-Single; Metronome / MCI (1993))
- 1993: It Feels Good to Be Loved (as Nemorin; auch Maxi-Single; MCI / BMG)
- 1994: Mission of Love (as Nemorin; auch Maxi-Single; EMI)
- 1995: Boat on the River (as Nemorin; EMI)
