= Penny (album) =

Studio album by Penny McLean
- Released: 1977
- Genre: Disco
- Length: 38:43
- Label: Jupiter Records
- Producer: Michael Kunze

Penny McLean chronology
Lady Bump (1975)	Penny (1977)	Midnight Explosion (1978)

Penny is the second studio album by Austrian-born singer Penny McLean released in 1977. Three solo singles were released before the album launched: "Nobody's Child", "Zwischen Zwei Gefühlen" and "Dance, Bunny Honey, Dance", but only the last one was included in the final track list. At the same time, Penny also sang on Silver Convention, and the group's single: "The Boys from Liverpool" was released, after that she announcing her departure from the group. The album managed to chart in Sweden.

== Critical reception ==
Professional ratings
Review scores
Source	Rating
AllMusic	3/5 stars

In RPM, Jackie Valasek wrote that he was "not really knocked out" by McLean's album in terms of its disco content, though he noted that side two contains "a couple of good listening cuts" and singled out "Mambo Mama" as the best disco track.

Justin Kantor of AllMusic concluded that Penny is "a better showcase for her vocal strength" with production that is "more varied and less thin" than Lady Bump, and, despite "a couple of lackluster moments", he found the album "thoroughly enjoyable" and "relatively free of the gimmickry found on her first album".

== Track listing ==
Side one
No.	Title	Writer(s)	Length
1.	"Dance, Bunny Honey, Dance"	Michael Kunze; Stefan Klinkhammer	3:36
2.	"24 Hours Of Love"	Hanus Berka; M. Kunze	3:42
3.	"Disco Dandy"	M. Kunze; S. Klinkhammer	3:29
4.	"Summernight Stomp"	M. Kunze; S. Klinkhammer	4:37
5.	"Mambo Mama"	M. Kunze; S. Klinkhammer	4:09

Side two
No.	Title	Writer(s)	Length
6.	"Nosiree"	M. Kunze; S. Klinkhammer	3:31
7.	"Please Mr. B"	M. Kunze; S. Klinkhammer	5:02
8.	"Midnight Angel"	M. Kunze; S. Klinkhammer	3:42
9.	"Big Bells"	Barry Mason; M. Kunze	3:24
10.	"One Little Smile"	Charles Orieux; Ingo Cramer; M. Kunze	3:31

== Personnel ==
Credits adapted from the liner notes of Penny (1977) LP.

- Produced by Michael Kunze
- Arranged by Stefan Klinkhammer
- Engineer: Zeke Lund
- Photography by Didi Zill

Musicians

- Bass: Gary Unwin
- Drums: Martin Harrison
- Flute, Saxophone: Giuseppe Solera
- Guitar: Mats Björklund, Sigi Schwab*
- Keyboards: Charly Ricanek
- Percussion [Latin]: Joseph Spector
- Violin: Fritz Sonnleitner's Fantastic Strings

== Charts ==
Weekly charts for Penny.
Chart (1977)	Position
Sweden Albums Top 60	22
