= Lady Bump =

Single by Penny McLean

from the album Lady Bump
- B-side: "The Lady Bumps On" (instrumental)
- Released: 1975
- Genre: Pop, disco
- Length: 3:42
- Label: Jupiter (Germany); Atco (USA); EMI (UK); Columbia (Canada)
- Songwriters: Levay, Prager
- Producer: Michael Kunze

Penny McLean singles chronology
"A Letter From Miami" (1974)	"Lady Bump" (1975)	"Smoke Gets in Your Eyes" (1975)

"Lady Bump" is a pop disco song by Austrian singer Penny McLean, released in 1975. It was a hit for McLean, who was formerly with Silver Convention.

== About the single ==
The single backed with "The Lady Bumps On" was released on the Jupiter record label cat - 16 069 AT in June 1975.

The single reached the three million mark. For its popularity in New York discos, the track backed with "The Lady Bumps On" was rated number 14 by November 1975. According to RPM the single shipped 90,000 to the New York area in the first week of release.

In January 1976, the single debuted on the Cashbox pop singles charts, peaking at number 61. In July 1976, "Lady Bump" rated number 7 in Australia's 2S Music Survey.

== Charts ==
=== Weekly charts ===
Weekly chart performance for "Lady Bump"
Chart (1975–1976)	Peak position
Australia (Kent Music Report)	9
Austria (Ö3 Austria Top 40)	1
Belgium (Ultratop 50 Flanders)	2
Canada Top Singles (RPM)	15
France (SNEP)	11
Ireland (IRMA)	18
Netherlands (Single Top 100)	4
Sweden (Sverigetopplistan)	2
Switzerland (Schweizer Hitparade)	4
US Billboard Hot 100	48
US Hot R&B/Hip-Hop Songs (Billboard)	90
US Disco Singles (Billboard)	1
US Dance Club Songs (Billboard)	1
West Germany (GfK)	1

=== Year-end charts ===
Year-end chart performance for "Lady Bump"
Chart (1976)	Position
Australia (Kent Music Report)	24
Canada (RPM)	96

== Certifications ==
Certifications for "Lady Bump"
Region	Certification	Certified units/sales
Canada (Music Canada)	Gold	75,000^{^}
Germany (BVMI)	Gold	500,000^{^}
^{^} Shipments figures based on certification alone.
