= Don't Say Goodnight =

Don't Say Goodnight may refer to:

- "Don't Say Goodnight", a 1934 song by Rudy Vallée & His Connecticut Yankees
- "Don't Say Goodnight", a 1957 single by the Valentines
- "Don't Say Goodnight", a song by the Everly Brothers from Born Yesterday, 1985
- "Don't Say Goodnight", a song by Rheostatics from The Nightlines Sessions, 1998
- "Don't Say Goodnight", a song by Hot Chelle Rae from Recklessly, 2014
- "Don't Say Goodnight and Mean Goodbye", a song by the Shirelles from Foolish Little Girl, 1963
- "Don't Say Goodnight, My Love", a song by Penny McLean from Midnight Explosion, 1978
- "Don't Say Goodnight (It's Time for Love)", a single by the Isley Brothers from Go All the Way, 1980
- "Don't Say Goodnight, Say Good Morning", a song by Reba McEntire from Reba Nell McEntire, 1986
