= Stefan Klinkhammer =

German musician (1935–2001)

- Also known as: August St. John, Jaques Koblenzer, Steven Hammer
- Born: 26 July 1935
- Origin: Koblenz, Germany
- Died: 30 March 2001 (aged 65)
- Genres: Various
- Occupation(s): Musician, composer, arranger, producer
- Member of: Orchester Stephan Hammer, Hot Blood

Stefan Klinkhammer (26 July 1935 – 30 March 2001) was a German musician who produced and composed a number of charting hits. His compositions include, "Dance, Bunny Honey, Dance" for Penny McLean and "Skateboard" for Benny. He is also remembered for his work with the group Boney M.

== Background ==
Stefan Klinkammer has been credited with helping to create the sound of Boney M. It was founding member, Marcia Barrett who acknowledged his importance in the group's sound and referred to him as a genius musical arranger. He was there when Barrett tried out for the group. She met producer Frank Farian at Klinkhammer's flat. Klinkhammer accompanied her on piano and she went through four songs for both of them. At the end Farian turned to her and said, "that will do".

In the early stage of his career as a writer, Klinkhammer received support from Michael Kunze.

== Career ==
Klinkhammer was part of a group called Hot Blood, which consisted of himself, May Ambruster, and Penny Duke. They recorded the song "Soul Dracula. Backed with "Dracula's Theme", it was released in Germany on Hansa International 17 103 AT in 1976. In late 1976, it made the UK charts, peaking at no. 32. It charted in the Netherlands in early 1977, peaking at no. 5 during its eight week run. It also charted twice in Belgium, making it to no. 6 during its eight-week run, then once again spending one week in the chart, it peaked at no. 46.

Stefan Klinkhammer co-wrote "Dance, Bunny Honey, Dance" with Michael Kunze. Kunze produced the song for Penny McLean. Backed with "Summernight Stomp", and released on Jupiter 11 313 AT in 1976, it charted in both Germany and Sweden. Spending thirteen weeks in the German charts, it peaked at no. 26. In Sweden it peaked at no. 17 during its three-week run.

Working with producer Frank Farian on the Boney M 1976 Take the Heat off Me album, Klinkhammer handled the arrangements. Done in a Euro-disco style, the album also included the single, "Sunny", a Bobby Hebb composition. It topped the charts in Germany, as well as making the top ten in other countries around the world.

Along with Hans-Ulrich Weigel, Frank Farian and Roland Kaiser, he co-wrote the song "Skateboard". It was recorded by Benny Schnier. Produced by Frank Farian and backed with "Daniela, was nun?", it was released on Hansa 11 397 AT in December 1977. The single became a hit, peaking at no. 40 during its ten-week run in the German charts. Another group, Copains, had also charted with their composition.

It was reported in the 21 January 1978 issue of Record World that Klinkhammer, along with Sylvester Levay, Ernest Clinton and Benjamin Mason, were the new talent of composers, producers and arrangers that Michael Kunze and Butterfly Publishing were very interested in.

Klinkhammer co-composed the song "Mexican Taxi Man", which was recorded by the Valverde Brothers. Produced by Tony Hendrik, it was released as the B side of their "Layla" single in February 1978. Working with Peter Orloff, Stefan Klinkhammer co-produced the single "Then He Kissed Me" for the group Ebony. It was released in Germany on Aladin 1C 006-32 779 in 1978.

He co-wrote "Disco do Brazil" with Dietmar Kawohl and Fred Jay. The song was produced by Dietmar Kawohl. Backed with "I Was Born to Reggae", it was released on Hansa 100 617-100 in May 1979.

Klinkhammer rearranged the words to "Hold on I'm Coming" for Precious Wilson. It was a chart hit in the Netherlands, making it to no. 45 during its two-week run.

== Death ==
Stefan Klinkhammer died on 30 March 2001. According to the Frank Farian's Fan Club/FFFclub blogspot, the cause of death was lung cancer.
