= Đorđi Peruzović =

- Born: c 1940
- Origin: Vrboska, Croatia
- Genres: Pop, schlager
- Occupation: Singer
- Instrument: Vocals
- Years active: 1958 - present
- Labels: Мелодия, Jugoton, PGP RTB, Supraphon, AMIGA, Croatia Records, Dancing Bear

Đorđi Peruzović is a popular Croatian pop singer. He has been prolific in his recording from the late 1960s through to the 2010s. He had chart success with the song "Where Were You During Thundering".

== Background ==
He spent his young years in Vrboska on the island of Hvar. He got his start at high school in 1958 performing behind the microphone.

He first performed at the Split Prokurative Festival in 1963 with "Balada o tovaru" which was written by Zdenko Runjić. Since then, he has been a regular. By 2014, he had recorded approximately fifty singles and five solo albums.

== Career ==
=== 1960s - 1980s ===
Đorđi Peruzović recorded the Viva Maria EP that was released on PGP RTB EP 50157 in 1966. The other three songs on the EP were, "Jedan Čovjek ... Jedna Priča" ("A Man... A Story"), "Svako Nekog Ponekad Zavol" ("Everybody Loves Somebody"), and "Još Samo Danas ("E Solo Un Giorno"). Also that year, he had his Hello Dolly EP released on PGP RTB EP 50288. Besides the title song, the EP contained "Dan Bez Tebe" ("My Wonderful Bambina"), "Moje Je Srce U San Francisku" ("I Left My Heart In San Francisco"), and "Djudjola" ("Giuggiola").

It was reported by Billboard in the magazine's 29 August 1970 issue that Peruzović won the first prize in the 10th international festival of pop music held in first prize in the 10th international festival of pop music held in Yugoslavia from the 5th to the 9th.

Competing in Split '72 twelfth international sing contest, Peruzović was a winner with his cover of the Nenad Vilovic song, "Where Were You During Thundering" (Di si bija kad je grmilo). It made the top ten in Yugoslavia and according to the 16 September 1972 issue of Billboard, the single was at no. 2.

He recorded the songs "Ljubavi ruku mi daj" and "Danas opet slušao sam pjesmu" which were released on single, Jugoton SY-22063 in 1972.

He was a performer in the thirteenth Sopot Festival which was held at the Baltic seaside resort in Poland from 21–25 August 1973. Also that year, his album Mojoj jedinoj ljubavi was released on Jugoton LPY-S-60998. It contained the songs, "Tvoje su usne ostavile trag", "Volim, volim samo nju" and "Balada o tovaru".

He recorded the disco song "Banana Cafe" which was written by Mirko Krstičević. It was backed with Ti živiš samo u mom snu and released on a single in 1977.

He recorded the single, "Opet skupa ti i ja" bw "Tri mice mace" which was released on Jugoton SY 2354 in 1979. The A side was a cover of Benny's hit, "Skateboard (Uh-Ah-Ah)".

=== 1990s - 2020s ===
In 2023, Đorđi Peruzović at age 83 was the winner of the 2023 Split Festival. It was also his 60th performance.

Along with Darko Domijan, Policijska klapa Sveti Mihovil, and Dženan Lončarević, Peruzović was scheduled to perform on 6 July at the 2024 Split Festival.
