= Dance, Bunny Honey, Dance =

Single by Penny McLean

from the album Penny
- B-side: "Summernight Stomp"
- Released: 1977
- Genre: Disco
- Length: 3:36
- Label: Jupiter Records
- Songwriters: Michael Kunze; Stefan Klinkhammer
- Producer: M. Kunze

Penny McLean singles chronology
"Zwischen Zwei Gefühlen" (1977)	"Dance, Bunny Honey, Dance" (1977)	"Mambo Mama" (1977)

"Dance, Bunny Honey, Dance" is a song by Penny McLean released as the first single of her album Penny in 1977. The song managed to appear in two charts worldwide.

== Charts ==
Chart (1977)	Peak Position
Sweden (Sverigetopplistan)	17
West Germany (GfK)	26
