= One Little Smile =

One Little Smile may refer to:

- "One Little Smile", a song performed by Helen Morgan in the 1934 short film The Doctor
- "One Little Smile", a 1965 single by David Garrick
- "One Little Smile", a song by Penny McLean from the album Penny, 1977
