= Midnight Explosion =

Studio album by Penny McLean
- Released: 1978
- Genre: Disco
- Length: 40:06
- Label: Jupiter Records
- Producer: Michael Kunze

Penny McLean chronology
| Penny (1977) | Midnight Explosion (1978) |

Professional ratings
Review scores
| Source | Rating |
|---|---|
| Allmusic | 4.5/5 stars |

Midnight Explosion is the third and final album by Austrian singer Penny McLean, released in 1978. The album was not a success, and its only single did not chart. At the time Penny reunited with Ramona & Rhonda for one final Silver Convention single, 1979's "Café Au Lait / Rollermania" which was also a flop. After the album she recorded five more singles, all without success, also released were three compilation albums. She laid the music behind and launched herself as an author, writing about esoteric subjects with several best-selling books to her credit. The album received favorable reviews, with Jason Kantof giving 4.5 stars out of 5. An unofficial CD was released in Russia.

== Technical and other info ==
The album was produced by Michael Kunze. Ralf Nowy arranged all of the tracks on the A side and the first and fourth tracks on the B side. Mats Björklund arranged tracks B2 and B5 and John Davis arranged the third track on the B side. The art direction was by Manfred Vormstein, and design by Ali Kohlmeier. The recording engineers were Peter Lüdemann and Zeke Lund.

== Track listing ==
Side one
| No. | Title | Writer(s) | Length |
|---|---|---|---|
| 1. | "Midnight Explosion" | Michael Kunze | 3:36 |
| 2. | "Circle Of Flames" | Hanus Berka; M. Kunze | 3:42 |
| 3. | "Dancing With The Night Tribe" | M. Kunze; James Cobas | 3:29 |
| 4. | "I Need A Friend" | M. Kunze; Ralf Nowy | 4:37 |
| 5. | "Boogie Heaven" | M. Kunze | 4:09 |

Side two
| No. | Title | Writer(s) | Length |
|---|---|---|---|
| 6. | "Hypnotic Love" | M. Kunze; Ralf Nowy | 4:32 |
| 7. | "Kidnapped-Hijacked" | Keith Forsey; Mats Björklund | 3:52 |
| 8. | "Backstreet Angel" | M. Kunze; Christian Bruhn | 4:00 |
| 9. | "Monkey, Monkey" | M. Kunze | 4:46 |
| 10. | "Don't Say Goodnight, My Love" | K. Forsey; M. Björklund | 4:02 |
