= Devil Eyes (song) =

Single by Penny McLean

from the album Lady Bump
- B-side: "I'm Knocking (At Your Door)"
- Released: 1976
- Genre: Disco
- Length: 3:45
- Label: Jupiter Records
- Songwriter(s): Michael Kunze; Sylvester Levay
- Producer(s): Michael Kunze

Penny McLean singles chronology
| "1-2-3-4... Fire!" (1976) | "Devil Eyes" (1976) | "Nobody's Child" (1976) |

"Devil Eyes" is a song by Penny McLean released as fourth single from her album Lady Bump in 1976. The song managed to appear in 2 charts worldwide. Justin Kantor from the website "AllMusic" cited "Devil Eyes" as one of the few enjoyable moments to be found in the Lady Bump album.

== Charts ==
| Chart (1976) | Peak Position |
|---|---|
| Sweden (Sverigetopplistan) | 17 |
| West Germany (GfK) | 21 |
