= Mauritian diaspora in the United Kingdom =

Mauritian diaspora in the UK

Mauritians in the United Kingdom
Total population
- Mauritian-born residents 27,078 (2001 Census); 41,978 (2011 Census); 41,000 (2014 ONS estimate)

Regions with significant populations
- Greater London, South East England, East of England

Languages
- English, Mauritian Creole, French, Hindi, Urdu, Mandarin, Tamil, Cantonese, Telugu, Hakka, Marathi, Odia

Religion
- Hinduism, Roman Catholicism, Islam, Taoism, Buddhism

Related ethnic groups
- Mauritians, British Asian, British Indian, Black British, British African-Caribbean, Mixed

Mauritian diaspora in the United Kingdom are British people with Mauritian descent, or who were born in Mauritius. The 2001 UK Census recorded 27,078 Mauritian-born people living in the UK. The 2011 UK Census recorded 40,890 Mauritian-born residents in England, 434 in Wales, 571 in Scotland, and 83 in Northern Ireland. The Office for National Statistics estimates that in 2014, 41,000 people born in Mauritius were resident in the UK.

== Notable individuals ==
- Lise de Baissac, heroine of the Special Operations Executive during World War II
- Jean-Paul 'Bluey' Maunick, musician (Incognito)
- Safia Minney, founder of Fair Trade and environmental fashion and lifestyle label People Tree
- Rav Wilding, television presenter and police officer
- Bernard Paul, boxer of the 1990s and 2000s
- Julian Peedle-Calloo, TV Presenter
- Shelina Permalloo, English cook, author and winner of the MasterChef 2012 UK TV show competition
- Jackie Carter, singer and member of the 1970s Silver Convention
- Francoise Pascal, actress
- Gavin Ramjaun, TV presenter and journalist
- Naga Munchetty, TV presenter, newscaster and journalist
- Suella Braverman, Attorney General, Member of Parliament, Barrister.
- Tommy Fury, Professional Boxer, reality television contestant.
- Shalom Brune-Franklin, Actress
- Gary Noël, Footballer
- Gavin Heeroo, Footballer
- Herbert Rawson, Footballer
- Kalam Mooniaruck, Footballer
- Kevin Sanasy, Footballer
- Cat Sandion, TV presenter of the children's TV channel CBeebies and member of the UK version of Hi-5.
