= 1-2-3-4... Fire! =

Single by Penny McLean

from the album Lady Bump
- B-side: "The Wizard Bump"
- Released: 1976
- Genre: Disco
- Length: 3:35
- Label: Jupiter Records
- Songwriters: Stephan Prager; Sylvester Levay
- Producer: Michael Kunze

Penny McLean singles chronology
"Smoke Gets in Your Eyes" (1976)	"1-2-3-4... Fire!" (1976)	"Devil Eyes" (1976)

1-2-3-4... Fire! is a song by Penny McLean released as the third single from her album Lady Bump in 1976. The single was successful and managed to appear in 6 charts worldwide in the year of its release.

== Charts ==
=== Weekly charts ===
Chart (1976)	Peak position
Austria (Ö3 Austria Top 40)	11
Belgium (Ultratop 50 Flanders)	11
Belgium (Ultratop 50 Wallonia)	6
Netherlands (Dutch Top 40)	16
Netherlands (Single Top 100)	20
Spain (Spain Top 40 Radio)	32
Sweden (Sverigetopplistan)	6
West Germany (GfK)	3

=== Year-end charts ===
Chart (1976)	Position
Belgium (Ultratop Flanders)	76
West Germany (Official German Charts)	24
