= Skateboard (song) =

"Stakeboard" aka "Skateboard (Uh Ah Ah)" is song that became a 1977 single for German group Copains and a single for singer Benny Schnier. The song had a resurgence of interest the mid-2000s.

== Overview ==
The song Skateboard was written by Hans-Ulrich Weigel, Frank Farian, Stefan Klinkhammer, and Roland Kaiser. Along with "Amigo Charlie Brown" and "Bin wieder frei", "Skateboard" brought Frank Farian considerable success. With the kids riding around on skateboards and being noticed by Roland Kaiser and Frank Farian, an idea for a song came about. It was Kaiser who suggested to Farian that a song should be made about the sport. The idea appealed to Farian and with Kaiser, Fred Jay and Hans-Ulrich Weigel, Farian composed Skateboard. It took some time for the song to catch on, but it became a success when it did. When Benny's version became a hit, it became more popular than the version sung by Farian and his group Copains. In later years, the melody of the song was used as a stadium chant ("Chemie – uh ah ah – that’s football – wonderful") for German football club, Chemie Leipzig.

The song appears in the book, Skateboard Music of the 1960s and 1970s. Artists who recorded the songs, such as, Benny, Copains, Leif Bloms, Cliff Carpenter, Sten Nilsson, Đorđi Peruzović, Chinox, Nils Dacke, Les Copains, and Kjell Vidars, are featured in the book. According to the August - September 2002 issue of Trust magazine, issue #95, the song was on a list of "100 greatest singles of all time". It was also available as a phone ringtone.

According to Stern in 2021, this was Benny's paying homage to the skateboard.

=== Copains version ===
"Skateboard (Uh-Ah-Ah)"

Song by Copains
- B-side: "Rolling Skateboard"
- Released: July 1977
- Length: 3:30
- Label: Hansa International 11 512 AT, Hansa 11 512 AT
- Songwriter: Farian/Klinkhammer/Kaiser/Weigel
- Producer: Frank Farian

==== Background ====
Copains recorded the song which was produced by Frank Farian. Backed with "Rolling Skateboards", the song was released by Hansa Records in July 1977. This is the English version of the song. Farian produced the song and sang lead on it.

The single was released in Australia on RCA Victor 103111.

==== Charts ====
Spending seven weeks in the German charts, it peaked at no. 38. It was also a hit in Sweden, peaking at no. 17 during its three-week run.

==== Appears on ====
Albums
Artist	Title	Catalogue	Year	Notes
Va	Die größten Disco-Knüller	Ariola 26 126 OT	1977	
Va	It's My Discothek	Hansa 25 761 GT	1978	
Va	Super 20 International - Hitstation	Ariola 25 880 XST	1978	Charted in Germany, Peaked at no. 6, 8 weeks on chart Charted in Austria. Peaked at no. 6, 12 weeks on chart

=== Benny version ===
"Skateboard"

Song by Benny
- B-side: "Daniela, was nun?"
- Released: December 1977
- Length: 3:30
- Songwriter: (Farian/Klinkhammer/Kaiser/Weigel)
- Producer: Frank Farian

==== Background ====
Frank Farian produced the song for Benny Schnier, and backed with "Daniela, was nun?", it was released by Hansa Records in late 1977. This version was the more successful one. Benny was actually discovered by Farian. It was Dieter Thomas Heck who came up with extra title, "a dangerous sport.

According to the 29 December 1978 issue of Bravo, Benny hadn't had a good hit since "Amigo Charlie Brown". His producer Frank Farian thought they should take advantage of the skateboard boom in Germany. At first, he was skeptical but afterwards he was glad he recorded the song.

==== Charts ====
The record spent ten weeks in the German charts, peaking at no. 40 in 1977.

In 2006, Benny released the album, Die Hits von Gestern und auch Heut’ (The Hits of Yesterday and Today) aka Amigo Charly Brown, which contained newly recorded versions of his hits such as "Amigo Charly Brown" and "Skateboard (Uh-Ah-Ah)". According to an article by Gute Laune TV, the songs had been in the Ballermann charts for some weeks.

==== Appears on ====
Albums
Artist	Title	Catalogue	Year	Notes
Va	16 Top Hits 12/'77	Club Top 13 65 943 3	1977	
Va	Die grossen 20	Ariola 25 697 AT	1977	Album charted in Germany peaking at no 49, 1 week in chart.
Va	Super 20 - Hitparade	Ariola 25 909 XST	1978	Album charted in Germany peaking at no. 2, 9 weeks in chart Charted in Austria, peaking at no. 6, 16 weeks in chart.
Va	Du liebst nur einmal (Die große Schlagerrückblende Vol. 5)	Hansa 303 127	1987	
Bernhard Brink / Benny	Das große deutsche Schlager-Archiv	Sono Cord 39 763-8	1989	
Benny	Amigo Charly Brown	Ariola Express 74321 20714 2	1994	
Va	Schlager Gold	Ariola Express 74321 82652 2	2001	
Benny	Amigo Charly Brown (2006)	MCP CD 170.397	2006	Rudeboard Mix
Benny	Bin wieder frei!	Sony 88697907492	2011	
Va	Mein Herz schlägt Schlager	Ariola 88875 06531 2	2015	Charted in Austria; Peaked at no. 14, 1 week in chart

== Television ==
- Hitparade No. 102, 06.03.1978
- Hitparade No. 104, 01.05.1978

== Chart summary ==
Skateboard by Frank Farian, Stefan Klinkhammer, Roland Kaiser, Hans-Ulrich Weigel
Act	Country	Yr	Chart peak	duration
Copains	Deutschland	1977	38	7 weeks
Copains	Sverige	1977	17	3 weeks
Benny Schnier	Deutschland	1977	40	10 weeks
Benny & Copains	Netherlands	1977	8	6 Weeks
