= Kjell Vidars =

Norwegian band

- Origin: Norway
- Genres: Rock, pop
- Years active: c 1969 - 1990s
- Labels: Nett, Snowflake, Troll, Mariann
- Past members: Kjell Bjørklund; Øystein Hvalby; Ole Vidar Lien; Øyvind Lysenstøen; Arne Støen

Kjell Vidars was a Norwegian band who recorded from the 1970s to the 1990s. Their recordings were released on the Nett, Snowflake, Troll and Mariann record labels.

== Background ==
Kjell Vidars came about by chance. It was around 1969 when they were formed. Kjell Karlsen's band was supposed to play at an event in Granvang that was to do with the Vestre Gran Sports Association. However they pulled out. So, with the organizers not having musical entertainment, Arne Støen from Vestre Gran had the task to put together a band. He got Ole Vidar Lien to come in, and also Kjell Bjørklund was brought in. Arne Støen said that that they had to come up with name and his name sounded so bad that it couldn't be used. According to Ole Vidar Lien in a Hadeland article, with only a short period of time left to put it in the paper for an advertisement, the name Kjell Vidars was used.

During the band's career, they recorded songs such as "Puff, den lille dragen", "Veien hjem til Hadeland", "Skateboard", and "Guitar boogie". "Guitar Boogie" brought them some success.

== Career ==
In 1970, the group had the single "Se-Se-Se-Sebastian" / "Bare Min Skal Du Være" released on Troll TR 290.

In 1973, their album, Hei, hå nå er det jul igjen; Kjell vidars spiller 18 julemelodier for barna was released on Nett Records: NETT 516. It contained eighteen tracks that were produced by Leif Hemmingsen.

In 1975, the album Kjell Vidars Igjen... was released on Nett 536. It spent four weeks in the Norwegian charts, peaking at no. 12.

In 1979, their Kjell Vidars 5 was released on Nett Records Nett 549 and EMI 8C 062-37383. It made the Norwegian charts peaking at no. 8 during its five-week chart run.

== Later years ==
In 2015, a two CD compilation, 45 an 45 Later was released. It contained a booklet which chronicled their career and contained some recordings from a concert the band did in Bergslia in 1981.

It was reported by Bodøposten in November 2018 that the group was to release a Christmas album, Julefest på låven on both compact disc and red vinyl. The eighteen-track album featured vocals by the children's choir from Hadeland Kulturskole.

Founding member Ole Vidar Lien died on 25 July 2022 following a short illness. He was 72.
