= Nobody's Child (Penny McLean song) =

Single by Penny McLean
- B-side: "Time"
- Released: 1976
- Genre: Disco
- Length: 3:43
- Label: Jupiter Records
- Songwriters: Michael Kunze; Sylvester Levay
- Producers: M. Kunze; S. Levay

Penny McLean singles chronology
"Devil Eyes" (1976)	"Nobody's Child" (1976)	"Zwischen Zwei Gefühlen" (1977)

"Nobody's Child" is a song by Penny McLean released as a single in 1976. Though it does not appear on any of McLean's studio albums, it was included on two compilation albums years later: The Best of Penny McLean and Profile. The song managed to appear in 2 charts worldwide. The song was included in the soundtrack of the Brazilian soap opera Locomotivas.

== Charts ==
Chart (1977)	Peak Position
Belgium (Ultratop 50 Wallonia)	48
Sweden (Sverigetopplistan)	15
West Germany (GfK)	49
