= Christian Dornaus =

Austrian musician and composer

- Birth name: Johann Ernst Fischer
- Also known as: Andy Fisher, Johnny Fischer
- Born: May 3, 1930 (age 94); Vienna, Austria
- Occupation(s): Musician, composer, producer

Christian Dornaus (born Johann Ernst Fischer, May 3, 1930) is an Austrian musician and composer. Born Johann Ernst Fischer, Dornaus also used the names Andy Fischer and Johnny Fischer. During the 1960s, he had a string of hit songs in Germany before composing music for other artists.

== Early life ==
Dornaus was born Johann Ernst Fischer on May 3, 1930 in Vienna. His father died when Dornaus was six years old, and at the beginning of World War II, he was sent to England, where he lived with a Quaker family. There, he went on to attend the Rudolf Steiner School. At age 17, he returned home to Vienna, after which he began studying music.

== Career ==
Dornaus began his career in the early 1950s playing piano in a club in Salzburg, after which he took a job in Germany playing bass guitar. In 1957, he met Kurt Edelhagen and played as a bassist in his big band until 1962, at which point Dornaus joined Heinz Gietz as a studio musician. He remained with Gietz's studio until 1966, when he joined Edelhagen on tour as the band's producer and manager. Throughout the 1960s, Dornaus released numerous singles, including "Oh, Oh, What A Kiss" (1966), "Mister Cannibal" (1966), "A Man in the Woods", and "Der Babyspeck ist Weg".

In 1970, Dornaus switched to producing, working alongside Ralph Siegel. He composed music for several artists, including Chuck Bennett's "Love with a Touch of Soul", Cindy's "Mama (Angelo Mio)", Pepe Lienhard's "Jeanny Is My Memory", and Penny McLean's "Tut-Ench-Amun".
