= Penny McLean =

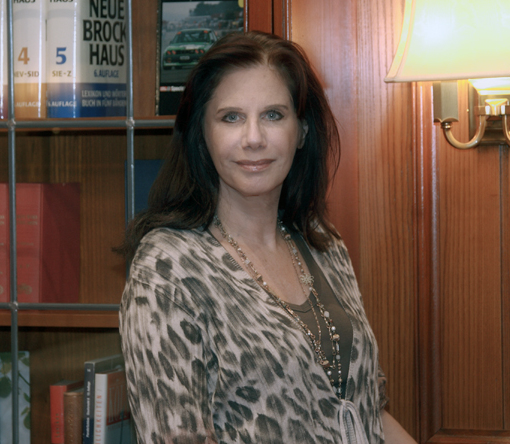
- Penny McLean, in 2010.

Background information
- Also known as: Barbra Münzer
- Born: Gertrude Wirschinger; 4 November 1948 (age 77); Klagenfurt, Austria
- Genres: Soul, pop, disco
- Occupations: singer, author
- Years active: 1965–1985 (as a singer)
- Labels: Ariola, Jupiter

Gertrude Wirschinger (born 4 November 1948), better known as Penny McLean, is an Austrian vocalist who initially gained acclaim with the disco music act Silver Convention, but also had exposure as a single recording artist. As a solo singer, she is most remembered for her million seller "Lady Bump". She is also an author.

== Early life and career ==
Gertrude Wirschinger was born in Klagenfurt.

In the early 1970s, under the name Barbra Münzer, she was part of the duo Barbra & Helmut. They released "Hideaway" bw "Stop" on the Telefunken label in 1972. Late she was a member of the trio Tony & Liza & Penny. In 1973, they released a single on the Ariola label, "Öffne Die Tür" ("Open The Door") bw "Der Fremde" ("The Stranger"). By the mid-70s, she was a member of Silver Convention, a group that also included Linda G. Thompson and Ramona Wulf. They had hits with "Save me" and "Fly, Robin, Fly". Around mid 1977, McLean left Silver Convention. She was replaced by Zenda Jacks. In October 1976, her single "Devil Eyes" was released on the Ariola label. Around July 1978, her album The Best of Penny McLean was released on Jupiter Records. In 1979, she released the single, "Tut-Ench-Amun" which was written by Bernd Meinunger, Horst Hornung and Christian Dornaus. Backed with "Child of Egypt", it was released on Jupiter 100 698. By late 1980, she was on the Teldec label roster.

=== Hits ===
Her hit "Lady Bump" sold in the millions. She also had hits with "1-2-3-4-Fire", "Dance, Bunny, Honey Dance" and more.

==== "Lady Bump" ====
By November 1975, the track bw "The Lady Bumps On" was rated # 14 in the New York discos. In January 1976, it was #8 on the Cash box pop singles charts. In July 1976, "Lady Bump" #7 in Australia's 2SMUSIC Survey. The single itself sold 3 million copies.

=== Writings ===
As a popular author, she has written on spiritual and numerology matters. Some of the books she has written are Lass los, was dich festhält. Von der Kunst, du selbst zu sein, Numerologie und Schicksal. Ihr Leben ist berechenbar and Schattenspringer - Ein Jacobsweg der Seele.

== Discography ==
=== Studio albums ===
List of studio albums, with selected details and chart positions
Title	Album details	Peak chart positions			
Title	Album details	AUS	CAN	SWE	US R&B
Lady Bump	Released: 1975; Label: Jupiter; Formats: LP, CS, CD	12	47	3	59
Penny	Released: 1977; Label: Jupiter; Formats: LP, K7	—	—	22	—
Midnight Explosion	Released: 1978; Label: Jupiter; Formats: LP, K7	—	—	—	—

=== Compilation albums ===
List of compilation albums, with selected details, chart positions and certifications
Title	Album details	Peak chart positions		Certifications
Title	Album details	NOR	SWE	Certifications
Success	Released: 1976; Label: Jupiter; Formats: LP	11	16	IFPI HK: Platinum
The Best of Penny McLean	Released: 1978; Label: Jupiter; Formats: LP, K7	—	—	
Star Discothek	Released: 1979; Label: Jupiter; Formats: LP, K7	—	—	
Profile	Released: 1980; Label: Jupiter; Formats: LP, K7	—	—	
Lady Bump	Released: 1986; Label: Jupiter; Formats: LP, K7	—	—	

=== Singles ===
List of singles, with selected chart positions
Year	Title	Peak chart positions											Album
Year	Title	AUS	AUT	BEL	CAN	GER	NET	SWE	SWI	US	US Dan.	US R&B	Album
1972	"Acapulcobanjopolka"	—	—	—	—	—	—	—	—	—	—	—	—N/a
1974	"A Letter from Miami"	—	—	—	—	—	—	—	—	—	—	—	—N/a
1975	"Lady Bump"	9	1	2	15	1	4	2	4	48	1	90	Lady Bump
1975	"Smoke Gets in Your Eyes"	—	—	—	—	—	—	—	—	108	—	—	Lady Bump
1976	"1-2-3-4... Fire!"	—	11	11	—	3	20	9	—	—	—	—	Lady Bump
1976	"Devil Eyes"	—	—	—	—	21	—	17	—	—	—	—	Lady Bump
1976	"Nobody's Child"	—	—	—	—	49	—	15	—	—	—	—	—N/a
1977	"Zwischen Zwei Gefühlen"	—	—	—	—	—	—	—	—	—	—	—	—N/a
1977	"Dance, Bunny Honey, Dance"	—	—	—	—	26	—	17	—	—	—	—	Penny
1977	"Mambo Mama"	—	—	—	—	—	—	—	—	—	—	—	Penny
1978	"Wild One"	—	—	—	—	—	—	—	—	—	—	—	The Best of Penny McLean
1978	"Midnight Explosion"	—	—	—	—	—	—	—	—	—	—	—	Midnight Explosion
1979	"Tut-Ench-Amun"	—	—	—	—	—	—	—	—	—	—	—	—N/a
1980	"Love Is Love"	—	—	—	—	—	—	—	—	—	—	—	Profile
1982	"Words"	—	—	—	—	—	—	—	—	—	—	—	—N/a
1982	"Wenn Die Träume Flügel Kriegen"	—	—	—	—	—	—	—	—	—	—	—	—N/a
1985	"Don’t Ever Leave Me Now"	—	—	—	—	—	—	—	—	—	—	—	—N/a
"—" denotes the single failed to chart or was not released.

== Film and television ==
Film & television
Title	Role	Director	Year	Notes #
Das Wunder	Woman of cards	Eckhart Schmidt	1985	Actress
Lieder gehen um die Welt	Singer	Dieter Pröttel	1982	Made for television
Bistro		Otto Draeger	1973	Television series
