= Smoke Gets in Your Eyes =

1933 song by Jerome Kern and Otto Harbach

Single by Gertrude Niesen with Ray Sinatra and his Orchestra
- B-side: "Jealousy"
- Released: 1933
- Recorded: October 13, 1933
- Label: Victor
- Composer: Jerome Kern
- Lyricist: Otto Harbach
- Producer: Ray Sinatra

"Smoke Gets in Your Eyes" is a show tune written by American composer Jerome Kern and lyricist Otto Harbach for the 1933 musical comedy Roberta. The song was sung in the Broadway show by Tamara Drasin. It was first recorded by Gertrude Niesen, with orchestral direction from Ray Sinatra, Frank Sinatra's second cousin, on October 13, 1933. Niesen's recording of the song was released by RCA Victor, with the B-side "Jealousy", a song featuring Isham Jones and his Orchestra. The line "When your heart's on fire, smoke gets in your eyes" apparently comes from a Russian proverb.

By the time of Roberta in 1933, the tune had been composed for a tap dance in the 1927 musical Show Boat, but was not adopted; in 1932 it was retried as a march for a radio series theme tune.

The song was also included in the 1952 remake of Roberta, Lovely to Look At, in which it was performed by Kathryn Grayson. It also was a no. 1 chart hit in 1959 for The Platters.

== Recording history ==
=== 1930s ===
Paul Whiteman had the first hit recording of the song on the record charts in 1934. Whiteman and his Orchestra performed the song with vocals by Bob Lawrence, and this version topped the charts in the same year. The song was reprised by Irene Dunne, who performed it in the 1935 film adaptation of the musical co-starring Fred Astaire, Ginger Rogers, and Randolph Scott. The Tommy Dorsey Orchestra released their version in 1938, with the B-side "Night and Day".

During the mid-to-late 1930s, Larry Adler and Henry Hall recorded live radio performances of the song on BBC Radio: Adler's rendition was a syncopated, harmonica arrangement, while Hall's was with the BBC Orchestra with vocals by Dan Donovan; Hall's version was released as a 10" single. Jazz pianist Art Tatum said in an introduction in 1955 that he also performed "Smoke Gets in Your Eyes" in the 1930s.

=== 1940s ===
Andre Kostelanetz's "Smoke Gets In Your Eyes"
- 1941 cover version of the original 1933 song
- You may hear "Smoke Gets In Your Eyes" performed by Andre Kostelanetz in 1941 here on Archive.org

Andre Kostelanetz recorded an easy listening arrangement of the song for Columbia Masterworks Records (4265-M) in 1941.

In the same year, the Benny Goodman Orchestra played the song on the radio with Helen Forrest, but she left the ensemble during the early part of 1941, so Goodman replaced her with Peggy Lee. Lee's recording for a Mutual broadcast was released on the collaborative album Roll 'Em by Goodman and jazz drummer Sid Catlett.

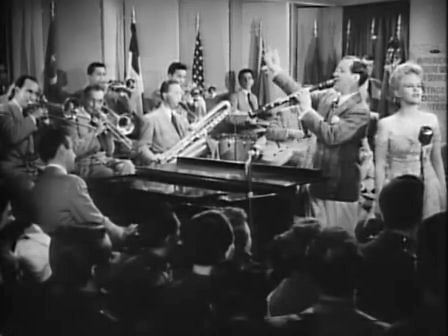
Benny Goodman and his orchestra perform with Peggy Lee.

Glenn Miller conducted his own rendition of the song at Abbey Road Studios in 1944, but due to his death later that year in the Second World War, his version was unreleased until 1995. On October 30, 1946, Nat "King" Cole recorded the song with his trio, consisting of himself, Oscar Moore on guitar, and Johnny Miller on double bass, during a live broadcast from New York City. Cole performed it on television in 1957 for The Nat King Cole Show.

Harry Belafonte covered the song in 1949 with jazz saxophonist Zoot Sims, one of Belafonte's first recordings. Sims' performance was parodied on December 10, 1977, on The Muppet Show by Zoot from Dr. Teeth and the Electric Mayhem, the character he inspired.

=== 1950s and later ===
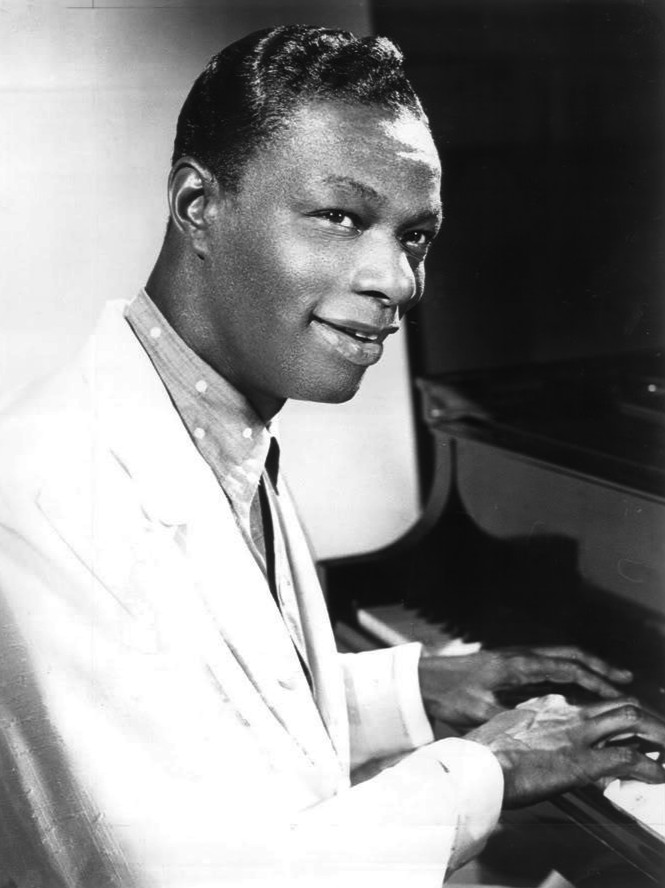
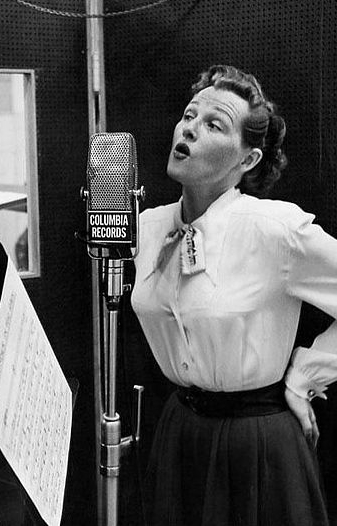
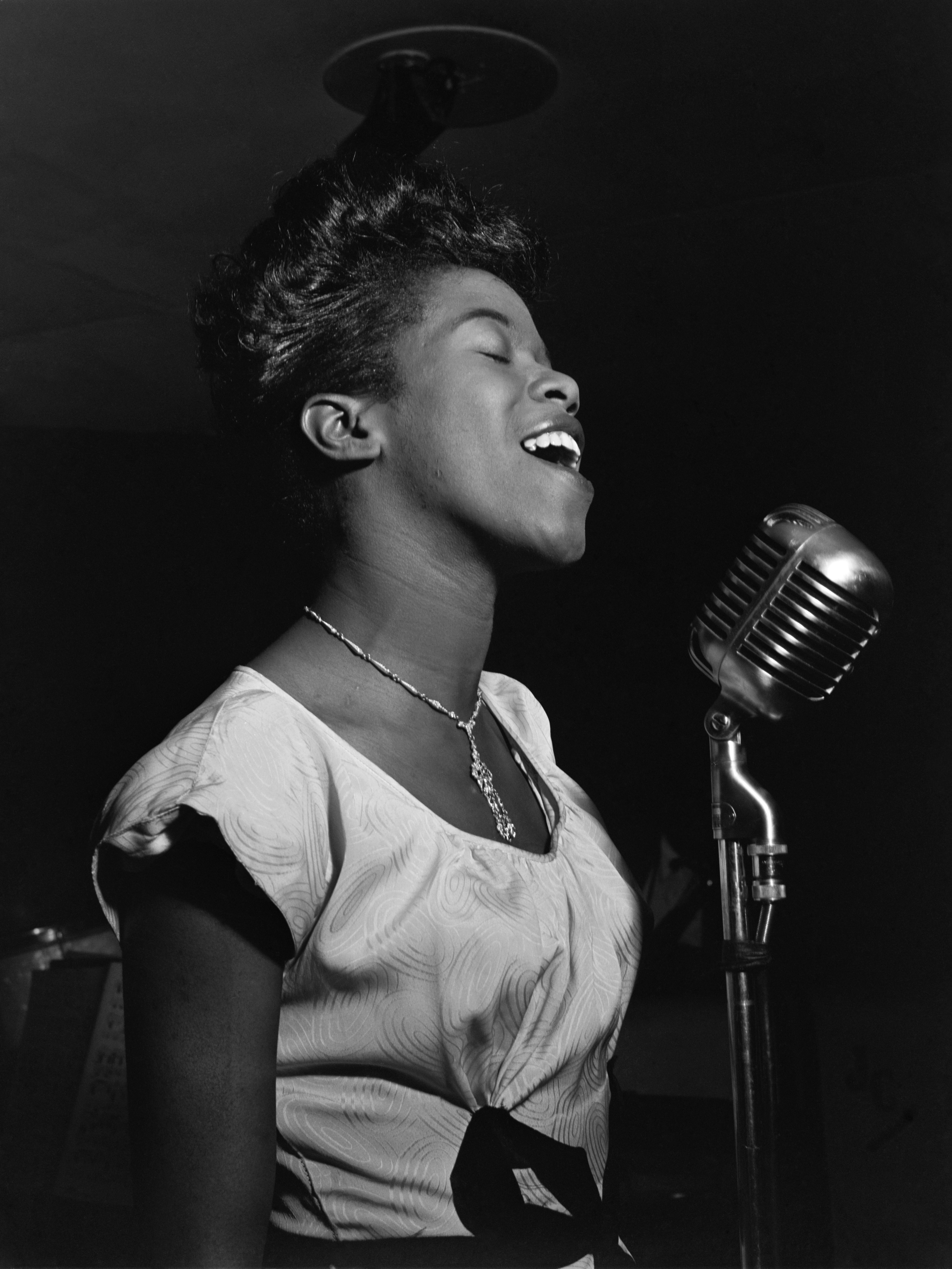
The song was covered by Nat King Cole (left), Jo Stafford (center), and Sarah Vaughan (right).

In 1950, both Charlie Parker and Jo Stafford released their versions of the song on their own respective albums, Bird at St. Nick's and Autumn in New York. Eartha Kitt recorded the song in 1952 with the Henri René Orchestra for her 1954 album That Bad Eartha, in the same sessions which yielded her 1953 hit single "Santa Baby".

Dinah Washington released the song in 1956 on her album Dinah!, Vic Damone on his 1956 album That Towering Feeling!, and Jeri Southern on her 1957 album When Your Heart's on Fire, named after a lyric from the song. Polly Bergen performed the song during the series premiere of her variety show The Polly Bergen Show, originally airing September 21, 1957, in the same year of Nat King Cole's televised performance of the song, in The Nat King Cole Show. In 1958, Sarah Vaughan released her rendition on her album No Count Sarah.

Coleman Hawkins played the song on his Good Old Broadway 1962 album.

Bryan Ferry recorded a version of the song which reached number 17 on the UK singles chart in 1974. Penny McLean's version was included in her 1975 album Lady Bump and peaked at number six on Billboard's Disco Singles chart.

JD Souther covered the song for the soundtrack to director Steven Spielberg's 1989 film Always, and has a cameo appearance performing it at a dance with the main characters, played by Richard Dreyfuss and Holly Hunter.

In 2025, Brazilian drag queen and singer Gloria Groove joined the soundtrack of the TV Globo soap opera Garota do Momento with a cover version of the classic "Smoke Gets in Your Eyes". The song received a new interpretation by the artist for the plot, which is set in the 1950s. Gloria Groove's version was part of a select group of covers of hits from that era, and was performed by the singer in her live shows, such as at The Town 2025 festival.

== The Platters version ==
"Smoke Gets in Your Eyes"

Single by the Platters

from the album Remember When?
- B-side: "No Matter What You Are"
- Released: November 1958
- Genre: Doo-wop
- Length: 2:40
- Label: Mercury
- Composer: Jerome Kern
- Lyricist: Otto Harbach
- Producer: Buck Ram

The Platters singles chronology
"I Wish" (1958)	"Smoke Gets in Your Eyes" (1958)	"Enchanted" (1959)

"Smoke Gets in Your Eyes" was recorded in 1958 by the Platters for their album Remember When? The group's version became a number 1 hit in the U.S. on the Billboard Hot 100 music chart, and was their highest hit on that chart. In 1959 it peaked at number 3 on the Rhythm and Blues chart. The song spent 20 weeks on the UK charts, peaking at number 1 for one week on March 20 of that same year. In Canada it was number 1 for 3 weeks. Buck Ram, the producer, said that Harbach praised them "for reviving his song with taste." The widow of composer Jerome Kern disliked the recording so much, she began legal action to prevent its distribution. However, after she was informed that the record was a huge seller and she was going to receive large royalties from its sales, she dropped her lawsuit.

In 2019, the song by The Platters was inducted into the Grammy Hall of Fame.

=== Chart history ===
==== Weekly charts ====
Chart (1958–1959)	Peak position
Australia	1
Canada (CHUM Hit Parade)	1
Belgium (Ultratop 50 Flanders)	5
Belgium (Ultratop 50 Wallonia)	8
Italy	1
Netherlands (Single Top 100)	4
South Africa (Springbok)	1
UK New Musical Express	1
US Billboard Hot 100	1
US Billboard Hot R&B Sides	3

==== Year-end charts ====
Chart (1959)	Rank
South Africa	3
US Billboard Hot 100	16
US Cash Box	14

== Blue Haze version ==
"Smoke Gets in Your Eyes"

Single by Blue Haze

from the album Blue Haze
- B-side: "Anna Rosanna"
- Released: 1972
- Genre: Doo-wop
- Length: 3:15
- Label: A&M
- Composer: Jerome Kern
- Lyricist: Otto Harbach
- Producers: Johnny Arthey & Phil Swern

Blue Haze singles chronology
"Smoke Gets in Your Eyes" (1972)	"You'll Never Walk Alone" (1973)

Johnny Arthey's studio group Blue Haze released a version of "Smoke Gets in Your Eyes" as a single in 1972, and on the album Blue Haze the following year. Their version was an international hit, reaching the top 10 in Belgium and the Netherlands, and on Billboard's Easy Listening chart.

=== Chart performance ===
Chart (1972)	Peak position
Australia (Go-Set)	30
Canada (RPM 100)	13
Flanders	2
Netherlands (Hilversum 3 Top 30)	4
Netherlands (Veronica Top 40)	4
UK Singles Chart	32
US Billboard Hot 100	27
US Billboard Easy Listening	5
US Cash Box Top 100	21
US Record World The Singles Chart	14
Wallonia	9
West Germany	42

== See also ==
- List of 1930s jazz standards
- List of number-one singles in Australia during the 1950s
- List of number-one singles from the 1950s (UK)
- List of Billboard Hot 100 number ones of 1959
- List of number-one hits of 1959 (Italy)
