= Love in a Sleeper =

Studio album by Silver Convention
- Released: 1978
- Genre: Eurodisco
- Label: Jupiter Records
- Producer: Stephan Prager

Silver Convention chronology
| Summernights (1977) | Love in a Sleeper (1978) |

Professional ratings
Review scores
| Source | Rating |
|---|---|
| Allmusic | 2.5/5 stars |

Love in a Sleeper is the final studio album released by German euro-disco group Silver Convention, which at the time consisted of vocalists Ramona Wulf, Rhonda Heath and Zenda Jacks. The album managed to chart in the RPM 's disco album chart, peaking #11. The single Spend The Night With Me peaked #80 in the Billboard R&B Singles chart, #10 in Dance Music/Club Play Singles and #12 in Canadian Dance Chart.

== Track listing ==
=== Side A ===
1. "Love In A Sleeper" - 5:33
2. "Mission To Venus" - 4:24
3. "Take Me, Shake Me, Wake Me" - 3:50
4. "Get It Up" - 5:00

=== Side B ===
1. "Acuestate Conmigo" - 4:27 * lead vocals Ramona Wulf.
2. "Spend The Night With Me" - 4:28
3. "City In The Sun" - 3:15
4. "Breakfast In Bed" - 3:48

== Weekly charts ==
| Chart (1978) | Peak position |
|---|---|
| Australian (Kent Music Report) | 90 |
