= Ray Sinatra =

Music director

Raymond Dominic Sinatra
- Ray Sinatra in 1952
- Born: November 1, 1904; Agrigento, Italy
- Died: November 1980; Las Vegas, Nevada, US
- Known for: Conductor

Raymond Dominic Sinatra (November 1, 1904 – November 1980) was an Italian-born American conductor, best known as the music director of Mario Lanza.

== Life ==
Ray Sinatra was born in Agrigento, Sicily, Italy, in 1904. He was a second cousin of Frank Sinatra. He received an extensive musical education under many artists. He became a conductor, bandleader and arranger. In 1935 he was working in Boston as a radio band leader. In 1936 he was conductor of Lucky Strike's Your Hit Parade. Frank Sinatra contacted Ray in the spring of 1937 while he was working in the NBC house orchestra, asked whether they were related, and mentioned that he wanted to become a singer. Ray checked and found they were cousins, and helped find a stint for Frank on an NBC radio show. Frank wanted to change his name to "Frankie Trent". Ray dissuaded him, saying "Are you kiddin'? 'Sinatra's the most beautiful name in the world – it's so musical." Ray became well known as a conductor. Early in Frank Sinatra's career, when he was leading the instrumental jazz combo The Four Sharps, he was asked by Fred Allen whether he was related to Ray Sinatra. Not long after, Ray was being asked if he was related to Frank.

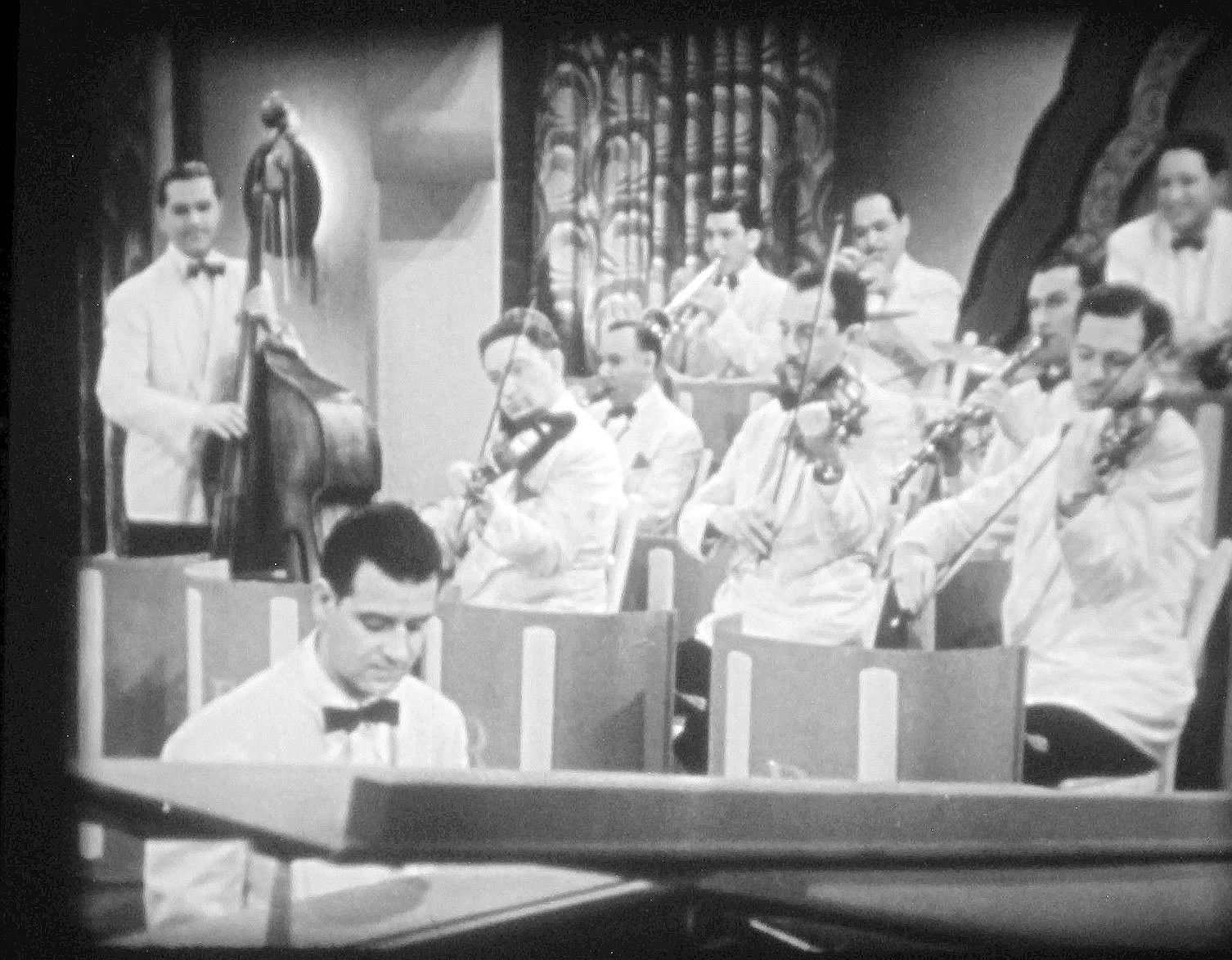
The Ray Sinatra Orchestra

Ray Sinatra conducted popular music competently, although he tended to use over-elaborate arrangements, and his orchestra sometimes sounded more like a big band. He was a modest success in the swing era. He worked well with Mario Lanza in two recording sessions at Republic Studios in Hollywood, including a famous version of Granada. Ray Sinatra conducted Mario Lanza's 1950 Be My Love, the singer's first single to sell a million copies. Sinatra would conduct many of Lanza's future non-operatic recording and radio show songs. Ray Sinatra was bandleader for Lanza on an NBC radio show in 1951 that pushed Lanza's expected earnings up to $750,000 for the year. In 1954, Sinatra led the orchestra for the Ziegfeld Follies at Sands Hotel and Casino, Las Vegas, with choreographer Bob Gilbert. For many years he was bandleader at the Tropicana Las Vegas.

His son Richard (1935-1979) became a character actor who appeared in both television and film during the 1960s.

== Selected recordings ==
- Mario Lanza With Ray Sinatra And His Orchestra – Granada / Lolita 2 versions RCA Victor Red Seal 1949
- Mario Lanza With Ray Sinatra And His Orchestra – Siboney / Valencia (7", Single) RCA Victor
- Mario Lanza Con Orquesta Dirigida Por Ray Sinatra – La Caricia De Tu Mano (7", EP) RCA 1957
- Mario Lanza Con Orquesta Dirigida Por Ray Sinatra – Granada (7", EP) RCA 1958
- Mario Lanza, Jeff Alexander Choir, Ray Sinatra – O Come All Ye Faithful (7", EP) His Master's Voice

== Sources ==
- American Theatre Organ Society (1980), Theatre Organ: Journal of the American Theatre Organ Society
- "Artist Facts for Frank Sinatra". Song Facts.
- Cesari, Armando (2004), Mario Lanza: An American Tragedy, Baskerville Publishers, Inc., ISBN 978-1-880909-66-9
- Friedwald, Will (1995), Sinatra! the Song is You: A Singer's Art, Simon and Schuster, ISBN 978-0-684-19368-7
- Kaplan, James (2015-10-27), Sinatra: The Chairman, Knopf Doubleday Publishing Group, ISBN 978-0-385-53540-3
- Levinson, Peter J. (1999-11-18), Trumpet Blues: The Life of Harry James, Oxford University Press, ISBN 978-0-19-028317-9
- Marchese, Joe (November 25, 2015). "Review: Frank Sinatra, "A Voice on Air: 1935–1955"". The Second Disc.
- McGovern, Derek. "A Mario Lanza Musical Who's Who". Mario Lanza, Tenor.
- "Movie Life of Mario Lanza". Movie Life – Yearbook.
- "Photograph of Bob Gilbert and Ray Sinatra, Las Vegas, 1954". University of Nevada, Las Vegas Libraries.
- Summers, Anthony; Swan, Robbyn (2007-12-18), Sinatra: The Life, Knopf Doubleday Publishing Group, ISBN 978-0-307-42776-2

== External sources ==
Media related to Ray Sinatra at Wikimedia Commons

- Ray Sinatra at IMDb
