= Hans-Ulrich Weigel =

German songwriter (born 1944)

- Born: Hans-Ulrich Weigel; 1944 (age 81–82); Germany
- Other names: Hans-Ulrich Weigel, Ulli Weigel
- Occupations: Songwriter, record producer, music publisher, author

Hans-Ulrich Weigel (born 1944) is a German songwriter, music publisher, producer and author who has either composed or co-composed a plethora of hits for mainly German artists. His most active and successful period was in the 1970s.

== Background ==
Hans Ulrich Weigel was born on 13 November 1944 in Erbach, Germany.

His compositions, co-compositions and production work includes, "Es wird ein Bettler zum König" and "Mamy Blue" for Ricky Shayne, "Ich mach' ein Interview mit deinem Herzen" for Graham Bonney & The Stowaways, "Memories" for Rex Gildo, "Dein Platz in meinem Herzen bleibt frei" for Erik Silvester, "Skateboard" for Benny Schnier, "Kreuzberger Nächte" for Gebrüder Blattschuss and more.

== Career ==
According to the 20 June 1970 issue of Cash Box, "I'm Doing an Interview with Your Heart" performed by Graham Bonney came fourth in the 1970 German hit competition with 126 points. Alexander Gordon was the composer, and Weigel was the lyricist.

Weigel produced the song "Früh-stück" for Gebrüder Blattschuss. It spent five weeks in the German charts, peaking at no. 24.
