= Rudy Vallée & His Connecticut Yankees discography =

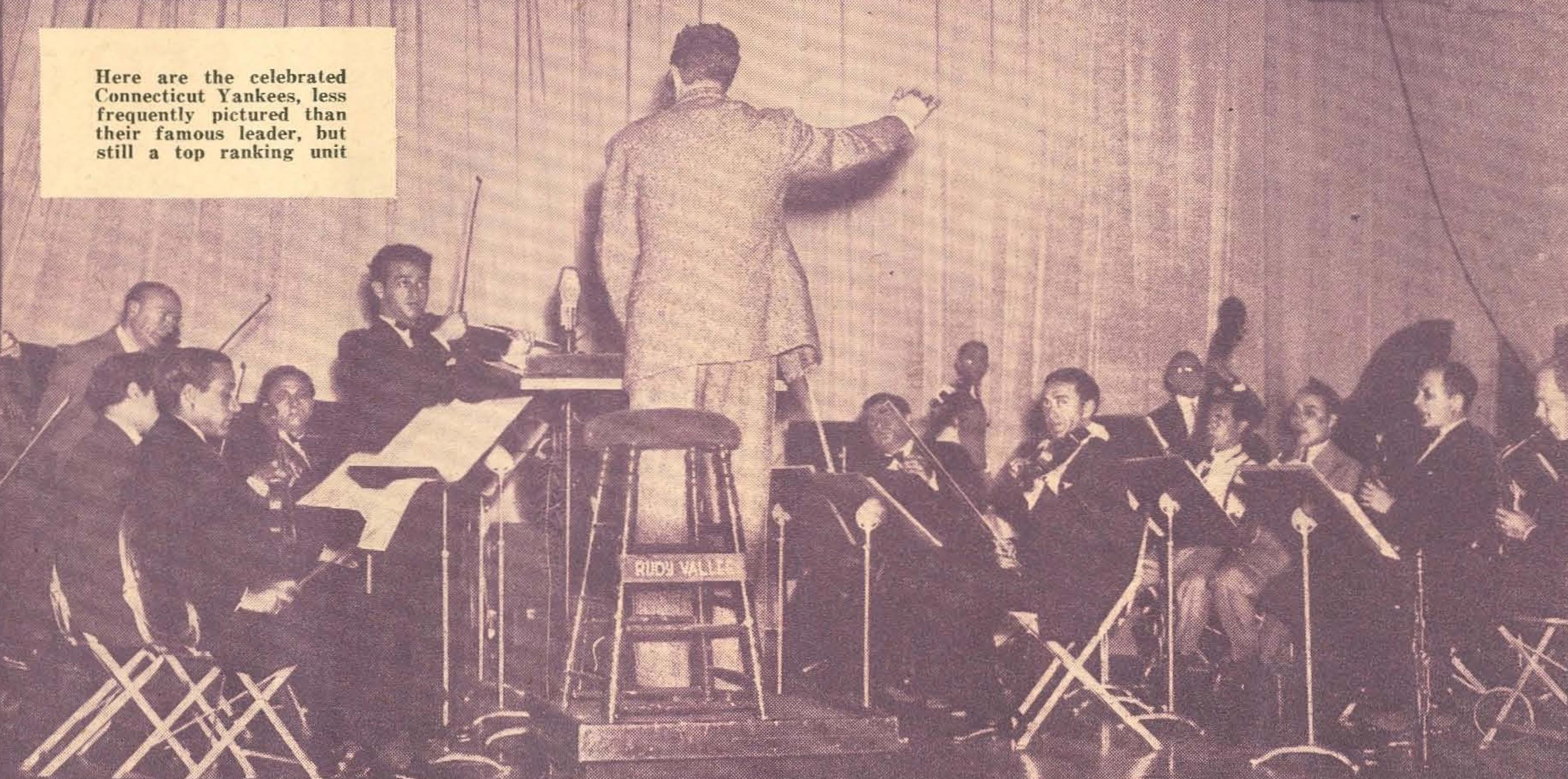
- Rudy Vallée conducts his band, The Connecticut Yankees, in 1935
- Albums: 7

This article is a discography for American singer Rudy Vallée.

== Studio albums ==
| Year | Album | Peak chart position |
|---|---|---|
| 1955 | Drinking Songs | – |
| 1956 | Lets Do It | – |
| 1958 | The Kid From Maine | – |
| 1962 | Stein Songs | – |
| 1964 | The Funny Side of Rudy Vallee | – |
| 1967 | Hi-Ho Everybody | – |
| 1974 | An Evening With Rudy Vallée | – |
| 1974 | Heigh Ho. Everybody! | – |

== Singles ==
| Date | Single | Label | Notes |
|---|---|---|---|
| 1927-09-16 | "Bye-Bye, Pretty Baby" | Edison | Joe Herlihy Orchestra, including Rudy Vallée |
| 1928-08-30 | "Right Out of Heaven" / "Lady Whippoorwill (Cross My Heart)" | Harmony/ Supertone | Credited as Rudy Vallée & Yale Collegians |
| 1928-10-10 | "Bye and Bye, Sweetheart" / "Doin' the Raccoon" | Diva | Credited as Frank Mater & Yale Collegians |
| 1928-12-12 | "Come West, Little Girl, Come West" / "Let's Do It, Let's Fall in Love" | Harmony | Credited as Frank Mater |
| 1929-01-10 | "Makin' Whoopee" / "If I Had You" | Harmony | |
| 1929-01-17 | "Marie" / "Caressing You" | Harmony | |
| 1929-01-17 | "When the World Is At Rest" / "In a Great Big Way" | Harmony | Annette Hanshaw, billed as Gay Ellis, accompanied by The Connecticut Yankees |
| 1929-01-31 | "Outside" / "Weary River" | Harmony | |
| 1929-01-31 | "The Land of Going to Be" | Harmony | Backed with "You'll Recognize My Baby" by The Singing Boys & Their Novelty Orchestra |
| 1929-01-31 | "You'll Do It Someday (So Why Not Now?)" | Harmony | Back of "Little Darlin'" by Jim Andrews. There also exists an unissued recording of this song from 1926. |
| 1929-02-01 | "(I Love You) Sweetheart of All My Dreams" / "The Song I Love" | Harmony | |
| 1929-02-06 | "Weary River" / "Deep Night" | Victor | |
| 1929-02-07 | "Sweet Suzanne" / "Honey" | Victor | |
| 1929-02-07 | "Coquette" / "That's How I Feel About You" | Victor | |
| 1929-02-25 | "Bye and Bye, Sweetheart" / "My Time Is Your Time" | Victor | |
| 1929-03-15 | "I'm Just a Vagabond Lover" / "I'm Still Caring" | Victor | |
| 1929-04-05 | "Me Querés? (Do You Love Me?)" / "On the Alamo" | Victor | |
| 1929-04-05 | "Every Moon's a Honeymoon" / "Huggable Kissable You" | Victor | |
| 1929-04-18 | "Underneath the Russian Moon" / "The One That I Love Loves Me" | Victor | |
| 1929-04-29 | "S'posin'" / "The One in the World" | Victor | |
| 1929-06-03 | "Heigh-Ho, Everybody, Heigh-Ho" / "Miss You" | Victor | |
| 1929-06-25 | "Baby, Oh Where Can You Be?" / "You're Just Another Memory" | Victor | |
| 1929-07-08 | "Where Are You, Dream Girl?" / "Pretending" | Victor | |
| 1929-07-15 | "That's When I Learned to Love You" / "A Kiss to Remember" | Victor | |
| 1929-08-07 | "Believe It or Not! (It's Always You)" / "I Love the Moon" | Victor | |
| 1929-08-13 | "Gypsy Dream Rose" / "M-A-R-Y I Love Y-O-U" | Victor | |
| 1929-08-15 | "You Want Lovin' (But I Want Love)" / "Lonely Troubadour" | Victor | |
| 1929-08-20 | "Perhaps" / "Album of My Dreams" | Victor | |
| 1929-11-06 | "A Little Kiss Each Morning (A Little Kiss Each Night)" / "Then I'll Be Reminded of You" | Victor | Both featured in The Vagabond Lover |
| 1929-11-11 | "I Love You, Believe Me, I Love You (The Dream of My Heart)" / "If You Were the Only Girl (In the World)" | Victor | Both featured in The Vagabond Lover |
| 1930-01-13 | "Love Made a Gypsy Out of Me" / "Beside an Open Fireplace" | Victor | |
| 1930-02-10 | "Stein Song" / "St. Louis Blues" | Victor | |
| 1930-02-19 | "I Still Remember" / "I Never Dreamt (You'd Fall In Love With Me)" | Victor | |
| 1930-04-16 | "Reminiscing" / "The Verdict Is Life with You" | Victor | |
| 1930-04-30 | "Kitty from Kansas City" / "If I Had a Girl Like You" | Victor | |
| 1930-04-30 | "The Song Without a Name" / "My Heart Belongs to the Girl Who Belongs to Somebody Else" | Victor | |
| 1930-06-03 | "How Come You Do Me Like You Do?" / "Old New England Moon" | Victor | Their rendition of "How Come You Do Me Like You Do?" was originally recorded in 1928. |
| 1930-06-25 | "Betty Co-Ed" / "Violets" / "Friends" | Victor | Containing a medley of "Violets" and "Friends |
| 1930-07-14 | "Confessin' (That I Love You)" / "My Bluebird Was Caught in the Rain" | Victor | |
| 1930-07-16 | "Good Evenin'" / "Just a Little Closer" | Victor | |
| 1930-09-29 | "Triple Cheer" / "Good Night, Poor Harvard" | Victor | |
| 1930-10-27 | "Sweetheart of My Student Days" / "Stolen Moments" | Victor | |
| 1930-10-27 | "She Loves Me Just the Same" / "Washington and Lee Swing" | Victor | |
| 1930-11-10 | "You're Driving Me Crazy" / "Thinking of You, Dear" | Victor | |
| 1930-12-23 | "Song of the Navy" / "To the Legion" | Victor | |
| 1931-01-13 | "Would You Like to Take a Walk?" / "Ninety-Nine Out of a Hundred (Want To Be Loved)" | Victor | |
| 1931-04-08 | "Whistling in the Dark" / "My Cigarette Lady" | Victor | |
| 1931-04-15 | "Two Little Blue Little Eyes" / "You're Just a Lover" | Victor | |
| 1931-06-15 | "When Yuba Plays the Rhumba on the Tuba" / "I'm Keeping Company" | Victor | |
| 1931-06-23 | "Makin' Faces at the Moon" / "Hikin' Down the Highway" | Victor | |
| 1931-06-23 | "Many Happy Returns of the Day" / "Pardon Me, Pretty Baby" | Victor | |
| 1931-07-25 | "Begging For Love" / "As Time Goes By" | Victor | |
| 1931-07-25 | "Why Dance?" | Victor | |
| 1931-08-07 | "This Is the Missus" / "Life Is Just a Bowl of Cherries" | Victor | |
| 1931-08-08 | "My Song" / "The Thrill Is Gone" | Victor | |
| 1931-12-07 | "When Your Hair Has Turned to Silver" / "My Temptation" | Victor | |
| 1931-12-07 | "Wind in the Willows" / "(When You Fall in Love) Fall in Love With Me" | Victor | |
| 1931-12-07 | "When Your Hair Has Turned to Silver" / "My Temptation" | Victor | |
| 1931-12-24 | "A Faded Summer Love" | Hit of the Week | |
| 1931-12-24 | "You Try Somebody Else" | Hit of the Week | |
| 1932-01-21 | "Home" | Hit of the Week | |
| 1932-02-04 | "By the Sycamore Tree" | Hit of the Week | |
| 1932-03-03 | "Was That the Human Thing To Do?" | Hit of the Week | |
| 1932-03-17 | "The Wooden Soldier and the China Doll" | Hit of the Week | |
| 1932-04-14 | "By the Fireside" | Hit of the Week | |
| 1932-07-15 | "Lovable" | Hit of the Week | |
| 1932-08-11 | "Maori" / "I Guess I'll Have to Change My Plan" | Columbia | |
| 1932-08-11 | "Strange Interlude" / "Same Old Moon" | Columbia | |
| 1932-09-09 | "Say It Isn't So" / "Three's a Crowd" | Columbia | |
| 1932-09-09 | "Me Minus You" / "Let's Put Out the Lights (and Go to Sleep)" | Columbia | |
| 1932-10-27 | "How Deep Is the Ocean?" / "Please" | Columbia | |
| 1932-10-27 | "Brother, Can You Spare a Dime?" / "I'll Never Have to Dream Again" | Columbia | |
| 1932-12-12 | "'Till Tomorrow" / "Here It Is Monday and I've Still Got a Dollar" | Columbia | |
| 1932-12-12 | "Just an Echo in the Valley" / "The Language of Love" | Columbia | |
| 1933-01-03 | "I'm Playing with Fire" / "A Bed-Time Story" | Columbia | |
| 1933-01-03 | "Linger a Little Longer in the Twilight" / "A Jug of Wine, a Loaf of Bread, and Thou" | Columbia | |
| 1933-01-25 | "Hey! Young Fella'" / "The Girl in the Little Green Hat" | Columbia | |
| 1933-01-25 | "Pretending You Care" / "The Whisper Waltz" | Columbia | |
| 1933-02-24 | "Meet Me In the Gloaming" / "Maybe It's Because I Love You Too Much" | Columbia | |
| 1933-02-24 | "Here Is My Heart" / "Old Man Harlem" | Columbia | |
| 1933-04-17 | "Now I Lay Me Down to Sleep" / "I Can't Remember" | Columbia | |
| 1933-04-17 | "Shadow Waltz" / "I've Got to Sing a Torch Song" | Columbia | |
| 1933-06-20 | "My Moonlight Madonna" / "On the Air" | Bluebird | |
| 1933-06-20 | "Thank Heaven For You" / "When the Sweet Magnolias Bloom Again" | Bluebird | |
| 1933-06-20 | "Free" / "Three Wishes" | Bluebird | |
| 1933-07-07 | "Lazy Bones" / "Heart of Stone" | Bluebird | |
| 1933-07-07 | "Stringin' Along On a Shoe String" / "Don't Blame Me" | Bluebird | |
| 1933-07-07 | "Moonlight Down Lovers' Lane" / "To Be or Not To Be in Love" | Bluebird | |
| 1933-09-06 | "Honeymoon Hotel" / "By a Waterfall" | Bluebird | "Honeymoon Hotel" is sung by Alice Faye. |
| 1933-09-06 | "The Last Round-Up" / "Shanghai Lil" | Bluebird | |
| 1933-09-06 | "Shame On You" / "Love Is the Sweetest Thing" | Bluebird | "Shame On You" is sung by Alice Faye. |
| 1933-09-06 | "Savage Serenade" / "Nagasaki" | Bluebird | |
| 1933-09-06 | "Happy Boy, Happy Girl" / "Empty Days" | Bluebird | "Happy Boy, Happy Girl" is sung by Alice Faye. |
| 1933-11-08 | "Everything I Have Is Yours" / "My Dancing Lady" | Victor | |
| 1933-11-08 | "Orchids In the Moonlight" / "Flying Down to Rio" | Victor | |
| 1933-11-24 | "I Raised My Hat" / "Puddin' Head Jones" | Victor | |
| 1933-11-24 | "Suddenly" / "What Is There to Say?" | Victor | |
| 1934-02-02 | "Goin' To Heaven On a Mule" / "Don't Say Goodnight" | Victor | |
| 1934-02-02 | "Dancing in the Moonlight" / "Carolina" | Victor | |
| 1934-03-05 | "Without That Certain Thing" / "You Oughta Be in Pictures" | Victor | |
| 1934-03-05 | "Oh, You Nasty Man" / "Hold My Hand" | Victor | |
| 1934-05-21 | "Sleepy Head" / "Sweetest Music This Side of Heaven" | Victor | |
| 1934-05-21 | "Spellbound" / "So Help Me" | Victor | |
| 1934-08-06 | "I'm Hummin', I'm Whistlin'" / "Panama" | Victor | |
| 1934-08-06 | "Just an Old Banjo" / "Somewhere in Your Heart" | Victor | |
| 1934-09-07 | "The Drunkard Song" / "Lost in a Fog" | Victor | |
| 1934-09-07 | "The Drunkard Song" / "The Tattooed Lady" | Victor | Laughing take of "The Drunkard Song." "The Tattooed Lady" is not to be confused with the later recording, "Lydia the Tattooed Lady." |
| 1934-09-07 | "Ha Cha Cha" / "Out in the Cold Again" | Victor | |
| 1934-09-07 | "Strange" / "P.S. I Love You" | Victor | |
| 1934-09-07 | "An Earful of Music" / "When My Ship Comes In" | Victor | |
| 1934-12-07 | "Sweet Music" / "Ev'ry Day" | Victor | Both featured in Sweet Music |
| 1934-12-24 | "Fare Thee Well, Annabelle" / "There's a Different You (in Your Heart)" | Victor | Both featured in Sweet Music |
| 1934-12-24 | "A Pretty Girl Is Like a Melody" / "On the Good Ship Lollipop" | Victor | |
| 1935-03-25 | "Life Is a Song" / "You Opened My Eyes" | Victor | |
| 1935-03-25 | "Love Dropped in For Tea" / "Seeing Is Believing" | Victor | |
| 1935-07-09 | "His Majesty, the Baby" / "I Couldn't Believe My Eyes" | Victor | |
| 1935-07-09 | "The Gentleman Obviously Doesn't Believe (In Love)" / "The Pig Got Up and Slowly Walked Away" | Victor | |
| 1935-07-17 | "Plain Old Me" / "Page Miss Glory" | Victor | |
| 1936-01-06 | "Hypnotized" | Victor | Backed with "Moonburn" by Eddie Duchin & His Orchestra |
| 1936-01-06 | "Say the Word and It's Yours" / "Everything's in Rhythm with My Heart" | Victor | |
| 1936-01-06 | "I Can Wiggle My Ears" / "He Wooed Her" | Victor | |
| 1936-02-24 | "Knick Knacks on the Mantle" / "There's Always a Happy Ending" | Victor | |
| 1936-02-24 | "There Isn't Any Limit to My Love" / "I Don't Want to Make History" | Victor | |
| 1936-02-24 | "Is It True What They Say About Dixie?" | Victor | Backed with "The Moment I Saw You" by Ray Noble & His Orchestra |
| 1936-04-16 | "Would You?" / "Us On a Bus" | Melotone | |
| 1936-04-16 | "She Shall Have Music" / "The Glory of Love" | Melotone | |
| 1936-04-16 | "The Call of the Prairie" / "I'm On a Wild Goose Chase" | Melotone | |
| 1936-05-27 | "Dream Time" / "These Foolish Things" | Melotone | |
| 1936-05-27 | "Empty Saddles" / "Rhythm On the Range" | Melotone | |
| 1936-07-30 | "A Fine Romance" / "The Waltz in Swing Time" | Melotone | |
| 1936-07-30 | "Bojangles of Harlem" / "The Way You Look Tonight" | Melotone | Both songs are from Swing Time |
| 1936-10-16 | "Who Loves You?" / "I Was Saying to the Moon" | Melotone | |
| 1936-10-16 | "Speaking of the Weather" / "All Is Fair in Love and War" | Melotone | |
| 1937-04-02 | "Coronation Waltz" / "Seventh Heaven" | Melotone | |
| 1937-04-02 | "Turn Off the Moon" / "That's Southern Hospitality" | Melotone | |
| 1937-07-02 | "Heaven Help This Heart of Mine" / "Harbor Lights" | Bluebird | |
| 1937-07-02 | "Don't Play With Fire" / "Vieni, Vieni" | Bluebird | |
| 1937-07-02 | "Old Sow Song" / "With Her Head Tucked Underneath Her Arm" | Bluebird | |
| 1937-08-11 | "If You Were Someone Else" / "An Old Flame Never Dies" | Bluebird | |
| 1937-08-11 | "The Whiffenpoof Song" / "Mad Dogs and Englishmen" | Bluebird | |
| 1937-08-11 | "Kitty From Kansas City" / "Deep Night" | Bluebird | Re-recordings |
| 1937-10-11 | "When the Organ Played 'O Promise Me'" / "In the Mission By the Sea" | Bluebird | |
| 1937-10-11 | "Have You Met Miss Jones?" / "I'd Rather Be Right" | Bluebird | |
| 1937-10-11 | "Rudy Vallee Surprises" | Bluebird | Novelty record |
| 1937-12-08 | "I'll Take Romance" / "Little White Lighthouse" | Bluebird | |
| 1937-12-08 | "The One I Love" / "Melody Farm" | Bluebird | Vocals by Al Bowlly |
| 1938-04-13 | "The Latin Quarter" / "A Stranger in Paree" | Victor | |
| 1938-04-13 | "Day Dreaming" / "I Wanna Go Back to Bali" | Victor | |
| 1938-04-13 | "Oh! Ma-Ma! (The Butcher Boy)" / "Lonesome, That's All" | Bluebird | |
| 1938-06-10 | "My Best Wishes" / "Naturally" | Bluebird | |
| 1938-06-10 | "Twinkle In Your Eye" / "Dream Dust" | Bluebird | |
| 1938-06-10 | "Phil The Fluter's Ball" / "Hawaiian War Chant (Pahuwahu)" | Bluebird | |
| 1938-12-18 | "Oh, Diogenes!" / "Sing for Your Supper" | Decca | With Harry Sosnik & His Orchestra |
| 1938-12-18 | "This Can't Be Love" / "The Shortest Day of the Year" | Decca | With Frances Langford |
| 1939-06-12 | "I Poured My Heart Into a Song" / "When Winter Comes" | Decca | |
| 1939-06-12 | "I'm Sorry For Myself" / "An Old-Fashioned Tune Is Always New" | Decca | |
| 1939-07-27 | "I Want My Mama" / "It's Way Past My Dreaming Time" | Decca | |
| 1939-07-27 | "Lydia the Tattooed Lady" / "Out of This World" | Decca | |
| 1939-12-19 | "Moonbeams" | Decca | Accompanied by Victor Young's orchestra. Single is backed with "To the Land of My Own Romance" by the Victor Young Orchestra. |
