= Madhouse (Silver Convention album) =

Studio album by Silver Convention
- Released: 1976
- Recorded: 1976
- Genres: Eurodisco; pop
- Producers: Michael Kunze, Sylvester Levay

Silver Convention chronology
Get Up and Boogie (1976)	Madhouse (1976)	Summernights (1977)

Madhouse is a 1976 concept album by German euro-disco group Silver Convention, which at the time consisted of vocalists Penny McLean, Ramona Wolf and Rhonda Heath, along with producer-songwriters Michael Kunze (a.k.a. Stephan Prager) and Sylvester Levay. The album is considered to be "funkier" than their previous releases". The album proved to be a moderate success, gaining considerable play at disco clubs at the time, but charted lower than Silver Convention's previous two releases, reaching number 65 on the Billboard Pop Albums chart, and number 47 on the Billboard Black Albums chart. The album has since been released on iTunes in several countries.

== Reception ==
Professional ratings
Review scores
Source	Rating
Allmusic	4/5 stars
Christgau's Record Guide	B

"Save Me remains the Silver Convention's most essential album, but Madhouse runs a close second" - Alex Henderson for Allmusic.

== Track listing ==
All tracks written by Michael Kunze and Sylvester Levay

Side one

1. "Madhouse"
2. "Plastic People"
3. "I'm Not a Slot Machine"
4. "Fancy Party"

Side two

1. "Dancing in the Aisle"
2. "Everybody's Talking 'Bout Love"
3. "Magic Mountain"
4. "Midnight Lady"
5. "Land of Make Believe"
6. "Madhouse (Finale)"

== Weekly charts ==
Chart (1977)	Peak position
Australian (Kent Music Report)	61
