= Benny Schnier =

- Also known as: Benny
- Born: Hans-Jürgen "Benny" Schnier; April 28, 1957 (age 69); Rahden, Westfalen, Germany
- Occupations: Singer, actor, television presenter
- Instruments: Voice, guitar
- Years active: 1970s - present
- Labels: Hansa, Akasa Records,

Benny a.k.a. Benny Schnier is a German singer and actor who had a number of hits during the 1970s. The hits include "Du bist 16", "Amigo Charly Brown", "Skateboard (Uh-ah-ah)" and "Bin wieder frei".

== Background ==
He was born Hans Jürgen "Benny" Schnier in Rahden, Germany. He has been a DJ, pop singer, radio and television presenter, program director, music director and actor.

He was just sixteen years old when producer Frank Farian discovered him.

His greatest success was in 1976 with the song "Amigo Charlie Brown" which reached number 14 in the German charts. Producer Frank Farian is responsible for some of his success.

== Career ==
=== 1970s ===
Working with producer Frank Farian, Benny recorded the song "Du bist sechzehn" ("Du bist 16") which was composed by Hans-Ulrich Weigel, Robert B. Sherman, and Richard M. Sherman. Released on Hansa 13 232 AT, it spent a week in the German charts, peaking at no. 43.

He recorded the song, "Amigo Charly Brown". It was released on Hansa 16 639 AT in 1975. It peaked at no 14 and stayed in the charts for seventeen weeks.

Skateboard was a song that came about as a result of Roland Kaiser seeing kids riding around on skateboards. Kaiser suggested to Frank Farian that a song should be made about the activity. The idea appealed to Farian and with Kaiser, Fred Jay and Hans-Ulrich Weigel, Farian composed Skateboard. According to the 29 December 1978 issue of Bravo, Benny hadn't had a good hit since "Amigo Charlie Brown". At first he was skeptical about it, but he went ahead and recorded the song, "Skateboard (Uh ah ah)" which was released on Hansa 11 397 AT in 1977. The song peaked at no. 40 during its ten-week run in the German charts. After the success of the song, Benny was glad he recorded it.

In 1978, Benny Schneir had his first role in a feature film. The film was Popcorn und Himbeereis. He acted alongside Olivia Pascal and Zachi Noy.

Benny recorded the song "Bin wieder frei which was produced by Thomas Meisel. Backed with "Ich sitz' auf einer Kokosnuß" it was released on Hansa 15 528 AT in 1978. It did well and had a nineteen-week run in the German charts where it reached no. 18.

=== 1980s - 1990s ===
In 1984, Schneir was working at Radio M1 Munchen.

In 1991, Schneir was head of music at Radio Xanadu in Munich.

== Later years ==
According to the 21.July 2022 edition of Westfalen-Blatt, a 65-year-old Schnier made an impromptu appearance at the Levern Schlager Party at the E-Center. He was pictured with host Matthias Lutz.

It was reported by Radiozene on 02.August 2022 that Schneir was now with Radio Schlagerparadies. The next Sunday, 7 August at 10:00am, he was to commence his role in hosting the "Wünsch dir was" (Make a Wish) show. The show was described as being of four hours of music where Schneir responds to requests and sends greetings to loved ones from Flensburg to Garmisch.
