= Summernights =

Studio album by Silver Convention
- Released: 1977
- Genre: Eurodisco
- Label: Jupiter Records
- Producers: Stephan Prager, Sylvester Levay

Silver Convention chronology
Madhouse (1976)	Summernights (1977)	Love in a Sleeper (1978)

Professional ratings
Review scores
Source	Rating
Allmusic	3/5 stars

Summernights (released in some countries as: Golden Girls) is a 1977 album by German euro-disco group Silver Convention, which at the time consisted of vocalists Penny McLean, Ramona Wolf and Rhonda Heath, along with producer-songwriters Michael Kunze (aka Stephan Prager) and Sylvester Levay.

== Track listing ==
All tracks written by Michael Kunze and Sylvester Levay

=== Standard release ===
Side one

1. "Summernights" - 3:58
2. "Wolfchild" - 4:20
3. "Hotshot" - 5:57
4. "Voodoo Woman" - 4:00

Side two

1. "Telegram" - 5:29
2. "Ain't It Like A Hollywood Movie" - 5:06
3. "Save Me '77" - 3:11
4. "Blame It On The Music" - 4:27
5. "Disco Ball" - 3:10

=== US release (Golden Girls) ===
Side one

1. "Hollywood Movie" – 5:06
  Alternative title for "Ain't It Like a Hollywood Movie"
2. "Blame It On The Music" - 4:27
3. "Save Me '77" - 3:11
4. "Disco Ball" - 3:10
5. "Telegram" - 5:29

Side two

1. "Summernights" - 3:58
2. "Wolfchild" - 4:20
3. "Hotshot" - 5:57
4. "Voodoo Woman" - 4:00

== Charts ==
Chart (1977)	Position
Canada Albums Charts (RPM)	86
Sweden Albums Top 60	20
US Top LPs & Tape (Billboard)	71
