= Get Up and Boogie (song) =

- German vinyl single picture sleeve

Single by Silver Convention

from the album Get Up and Boogie
- B-side: "Son of a Gun"
- Released: March 1976
- Genre: Disco
- Length: 2:49 (single version); 4:00 (album version)
- Label: Midland International, Jupiter Records
- Songwriters: Sylvester Levay; Stephan Prager
- Producer: Stephan Prager

Silver Convention singles chronology
"Fly, Robin, Fly" (1975)	"Get Up and Boogie" (1976)	"Tiger Baby" (1976)

Music video
- Video on YouTube

"Get Up and Boogie" is a song by German disco act Silver Convention from their 1976 second album of the same name. The song was written and composed by Sylvester Levay and Stephan Prager, and produced by Prager. The song was released as the lead single from the album Get Up and Boogie (also titled Silver Convention in some countries) in 1976.

== Composition ==
Similar to their previous 1975 hit single "Fly, Robin, Fly", the lyrics of "Get Up and Boogie" consists only of two phrases, "Get up and boogie!" and "That's right!" repeated throughout the song.

== Reception ==
"Get Up and Boogie" hit number one on June 15, 1976 in Canada, and reached No. 2 on the U.S. Billboard Hot 100, being kept off the No. 1 spot by Wings' "Silly Love Songs". Billboard ranked it as the #24 song for 1976. "Get Up and Boogie" also became a hit during the late-1970s disco scene.

== Covers and samples ==
- Australian rock band Regurgitator sampled the "That's right!" vocal line from "Get Up and Boogie" in their 1998 song "! (The Song Formerly Known As)".
- Canadian synthpop duo Kon Kan sampled a few snippets of "Get Up and Boogie" for their hit I Beg Your Pardon.
- In the late 2000s, the song was retooled as "Get Up and Snuggie" for use in commercials advertising the "Snuggie" (sleeved blanket).

== Charts ==
=== Weekly charts ===
Chart (1976)	Peak position
Australia (Kent Music Report)	19
Belgium (Ultratop 50 Flanders)	12
Belgium (Ultratop 50 Wallonia)	10
Canada Top Singles (RPM)	1
Finland (Suomen virallinen lista)	28
France (IFOP)	33
Ireland (IRMA)	15
Israel (IBA)	3
Italy (Musica e dischi)	7
Netherlands (Single Top 100)	6
Netherlands (Dutch Top 40)	6
New Zealand (RIANZ)	33
Norway (VG-lista)	6
Spain (PROMUSICAE)	22
Sweden (Sverigetopplistan)	14
UK Singles (Official Charts)	7
US Billboard Hot 100	2
US Billboard Hot Disco Singles	2
US Billboard Adult Contemporary	25
US Cash Box Top 100	1
West Germany (GfK)	1

=== Year-end charts ===
Chart (1976)	Rank
Australia (Kent Music Report)	98
Canada Top Singles (RPM)	18
US Billboard Hot 100	24
US Cash Box Top 100	37

=== All-time charts ===
Chart (1958-2018)	Position
US Billboard Hot 100	432
