= Save Me (Silver Convention song) =

- Belgian 7" vinyl single cover

Single by Silver Convention

from the album Save Me
- B-side: "Save Me Again"
- Released: 1974
- Recorded: 1974
- Length: 3:00 (single version); 4:16 (album version)
- Label: Midland International
- Songwriters: Sylvester Levay & Stephan Prager
- Producer: Stephan Prager

Silver Convention singles chronology
"Save Me" (1974)	"Always Another Girl" (1975)

"Save Me" is a 1974 song by the German Euro disco group Silver Convention, which became a hit in Germany. It features lead vocals by three session musicians identified only as Ingrid, Wilma and Monica. It is included in the album of the same name. It also was heavily played in disco clubs in many countries. Silver Convention later re-recorded the song as "Save Me '77" for the album Summernights. Today the original version of the song has appeared on several '70s disco compilations, as well as most "greatest hits" albums by Silver Convention. The song features repetitive lyrics consisting of the line "Baby save me, save me, I am falling in love". The song was also a hit in the UK and the Netherlands.

== Charts ==
Chart (1974–1976)	Peak position
Australia (Kent Music Report)	83
Belgium (Ultratop 50 Flanders)	9
Belgium (Ultratop 50 Wallonia)	5
West Germany (GfK)	33
Netherlands (Dutch Top 40)	9
Netherlands (Single Top 100)	8
Norway (VG-lista)	9
UK Singles (Official Charts)	30
US Billboard Hot Disco Singles	10
