= Ramona Wulf =

German singer

- Born: October 18, 1954 (age 71); Hanau, West Germany
- Occupation: Singer
- Children: 3

Ramona Wulf (born 18 October 1954) is a German singer. Her biggest success as a solo singer was in 1971 with the song Alles was wir woll'n auf Erden which reached number 8 on the German single charts. She was the public face of Silver Convention from 1974 to 1979.

"Fly, Robin, Fly", released by Silver Convention as the third single from Save Me in September 1975, reached number one on the United States Billboard Hot 100.

After the dissolution of Silver Convention in 1979, she worked as a solo singer but only saw moderate success.

Wulf's mother was German and her father was an African-American soldier in the US Armed Forces. She grew up in foster care and was later adopted by a permanent family, and as a result has no connection to her American family and did not grow up speaking English. However, she did learn to speak English and used it when she was in her professional career with the Silver Convention as shown in her appearances with the Silver Convention during interviews or co hosting after their performances and as well as in a 2018 English radio interview.

== See also ==
- Silver Convention
