= Get Up and Boogie =

- German cover (also used in other territories).

Studio album by Silver Convention
- Released: 1976
- Recorded: 1975
- Genre: Eurodisco
- Label: Jupiter Records
- Producer: Stephan Prager

Silver Convention chronology
Save Me (1975)	Get Up and Boogie (1976)	MadHouse (1976)

Professional ratings
Review scores
Source	Rating
Allmusic	3/5 stars
Christgau's Record Guide	B−

Get Up and Boogie (sometimes also known simply as Silver Convention) is the second studio album by the German disco group Silver Convention, and perhaps best known for including the song "Get Up and Boogie", which hit #1 on June 15, 1976, in Canada and reached #2 in the United States. Released in 1976, It gained popularity on the dance floors and also achieved a measure of commercial success, reaching #9 on the Billboard Black Albums chart and #13 on the Billboard Pop Albums chart. Critical reception of the album, both back then and today, was mixed, although an Allmusic review called it "a respectable, if uneven, Euro-disco effort that boasts the disco smash 'Get Up and Boogie'". The album has since been released on iTunes in several countries, sometimes under the title Silver Convention.

== Track listing ==
All tracks are written by Sylvester Levay and Stephan Prager.

Side one
No.	Title	Length
1.	"Get Up and Boogie"	4:00
2.	"No, No Joe"	2:58
3.	"You've Turned Me On (But You Can't Turn Me Off)"	3:34
4.	"San Francisco Hustle"	4:48

Side two
No.	Title	Length
1.	"You've Got What It Takes (To Please Your Woman)"	3:56
2.	"The Boy with Ooh-La-La"	3:48
3.	"Old Wine in New Bottles"	4:07
4.	"Play Me Like a Yoyo"	3:44
5.	"Thank You, Mr. D.J."	3:12

== Personnel ==
- Vocals – Penny McLean, Linda G. Thompson and Jackie Carter
- Drums and Percussion – Keith Forsey and Martin Harrison
- Bass – Gary Unwin
- Keyboards – Sylvester Levay
- Congas – Charlie Campbell
- Strings arranged by Fritz Sonnleithner

== Charts ==
=== Weekly charts ===
Chart (1976)	Peak position
Australian Albums (Kent Music Report)	15
Canada Top Albums/CDs (RPM)	3
German Albums (Offizielle Top 100)	48
Norwegian Albums (VG-lista)	15
Swedish Albums (Sverigetopplistan)	25
US Billboard 200	13

=== Year-end charts ===
Chart (1976)	Position
Canada Top Albums/CDs (RPM)	22

== Certifications ==
Region	Certification	Certified units/sales
Australia (ARIA)	Gold	20,000^{^}
Canada (Music Canada)	Gold	50,000^{^}
^{^} Shipments figures based on certification alone.
