= Save Me (Silver Convention album) =

- Handcuff cover variant (for Germany and other territories - original German vinyl edition pictured - also used for later western European rereleases.

Studio album by Silver Convention
- Released: 1975
- Recorded: 1974
- Genre: Eurodisco
- Label: Jupiter Records
- Producer: Stephan Prager

Silver Convention chronology
Save Me (1975)	Get Up and Boogie (1976)

Singles from Save Me
- 1. "Save Me" Released: 1974 (Germany); February 1975 (International); 2. "Fly, Robin, Fly" Released: September 1975

Save Me (originally released as: Silver Convention) is the debut studio album by Silver Convention, a German Euro disco group consisting of three female vocalists (Linda G. Thompson, Penny McLean and Jackie Carter) and two producers and songwriters (Sylvester Levay and Stephan Prager).

== Reception ==
Professional ratings
Review scores
Source	Rating
Allmusic	4.5/5 stars
Christgau's Record Guide	B+

The first track recorded for the album was "Another Girl", with an earlier track called "Save Me" also being included, even though the recording was recorded before the then-current line up of the group had been formed. The album was released in 1975, becoming a dance floor hit. Although commercial success was mixed, the album did hit number ten on the Billboard Pop Albums chart, and number one on the Billboard Black Albums chart even though only one member of the group at the time was black.

In 2018, music critic Vince Aletti topped the album Save Me on his top ten list of albums released in 1975.

== Track listing ==
All songs written by Sylvester Levay and Stephan Prager (Michael Kunze) unless indicated otherwise.

1. "Save Me"
2. "I Like It"
3. "Fly, Robin, Fly"
4. "Tiger Baby"
5. "Son of a Gun"
6. "Always Another Girl"
7. "Chains of Love"
8. "Heart of Stone" (Levay, Prager, Gary Unwin, Keith Forsey)
9. "Please Don't Change the Chords of This Song"

== Charts ==
=== Weekly charts ===
Chart (1975/76)	Peak position
Australian (Kent Music Report)	18
US Billboard Top LPs & Tape	10
US Top Soul LPs (Billboard)	1

=== Year-end charts ===
Chart (1976)	Position
US Top Soul LPs (Billboard)	36

== Certifications and sales ==
Region	Certification	Certified units/sales
Australia (ARIA)	2× Gold	40,000^{^}
Greece	—	30,000
United States (RIAA)	Gold	500,000^{^}
^{^} Shipments figures based on certification alone.

== See also ==
- List of Billboard number-one R&B albums of 1975
