= Jupiter Records =

- Founded: 1973
- Founder: Ralph Siegel
- Distributor: Ariola (1973–1981) TELDEC »Telefunken-Decca« Schallplatten GmbH (1981–1985) Polygram (1991-?) BMG Ariola München GmbH (?-?)
- Genre: Various
- Location: Jupiter-Records, Rindermarkt 16, 80331 München, Germany

Jupiter Records is a German record label that was founded in 1973. Many artists have had their recordings released on the label.

== Background ==
Ralph Siegel set up the label in 1973. Negotiations took place which resulted in a distribution deal with Ariola Eurodics GmbH. What helped the deal along was Siegel's good relationship with the interested parties and his own company which had been producing acts for Ariola.

Early on, Siegel had success with his signing of prominent singer Chris Roberts to Jupiter. Siegel produced Roberts' debut single for the label, "Du kannst nicht immer siebzehn sein". This established the label.

== History ==
In 1975 Silver Convention released their album Save Me on Jupiter LP 81 100 OT. A single from the album "Fly, Robin, Fly" debuted on the Billboard Hot 100 at number 87 for the week of 11 October 1975. Seven weeks later, the song was at No. 1. The three original singers on the hit weren't able to perform as Silver Convention so three female Jupiter Records artists, Penny McLean, Ramona Wolf and Linda G. Thompson became Silver Convention. The following year, they had success in America with "Get Up and Boogie" which got to No. 2.

Penny McLean's "Lady Bump" single was to be released in the US on the Atco label as a result of Atlantic Records acquiring exclusive US distribution rights from Jupiter Records.

It was reported in the 29 January 1977 issue of Record World that Helmar Kunte had left Jupiter Records for a position with Hansa Records in Berlin where he was taking over the company's international marketing department.

Clem Curtis & the Foundations recorded the Dave Myers / John Macleod composition "Where Were You When I Needed Your Love?" which was to be entered in the Eurovision Song Contest 1977. A strike by the electricians caused the song not to be televised. It was released on the Riverdale and Jupiter Records labels in 1977.

It was reported in the 3 April 1978 issue of Record Business that a deal had been done with Jupiter Records for the single "Crazy Paving" and a forthcoming album by new wave group the Billy Karloff Band. As well as in Germany, the deal involved Austria and Switzerland.

By December 1978, new artists that had been signed to the Jupiter label for international production and world-wide release included Joan Orleans, John Simon Rasputin, Waddell & Williams, Norma Green, Jeff Spencer's Jeans Orchestra and Pepe Peru.
