= Silver Convention =

German disco band

- Also known as: Silver Bird Convention; Silver Bird
- Origin: Munich, Germany
- Genres: Euro disco
- Years active: 1974–1979
- Labels: Jupiter, Durium, Midland International, Magnet
- Past members: Jackie Carter; Linda G. Thompson; Penny McLean; Ramona Wulf; Rhonda Heath; Zenda Jacks

Silver Convention were a German Euro disco recording act of the 1970s. The group was originally named Silver Bird Convention or Silver Bird.

== History ==
The group was initiated in Munich by producers and songwriters Michael Kunze and Sylvester Levay. The group was named after Levay's nickname: "Silver". Kunze in the late 1960s had been a pop lyricist who wrote protest songs in German; when these tunes went out of style, he began producing pop records and commercials. Levay had developed a taste for American music while growing up in Yugoslavia, eventually becoming a music arranger and lyricist.

Using female session vocalists named Ingrid, Wilma, and Monica, they scored a successful single in the United Kingdom in 1975 with the song "Save Me", which peaked at #30. They later used other vocalists, such as Gitta Walther, Lucy Neale, Betsy Allen, Roberta Kelly, and Jackie Carter for their first recordings and upcoming album. Since they were only a studio group, Levay and Kunze realized then that they would need to find professional entertainers for presentation to the public. Penny McLean, Ramona Wulf, and Linda G. Thompson became the public face of Silver Convention.

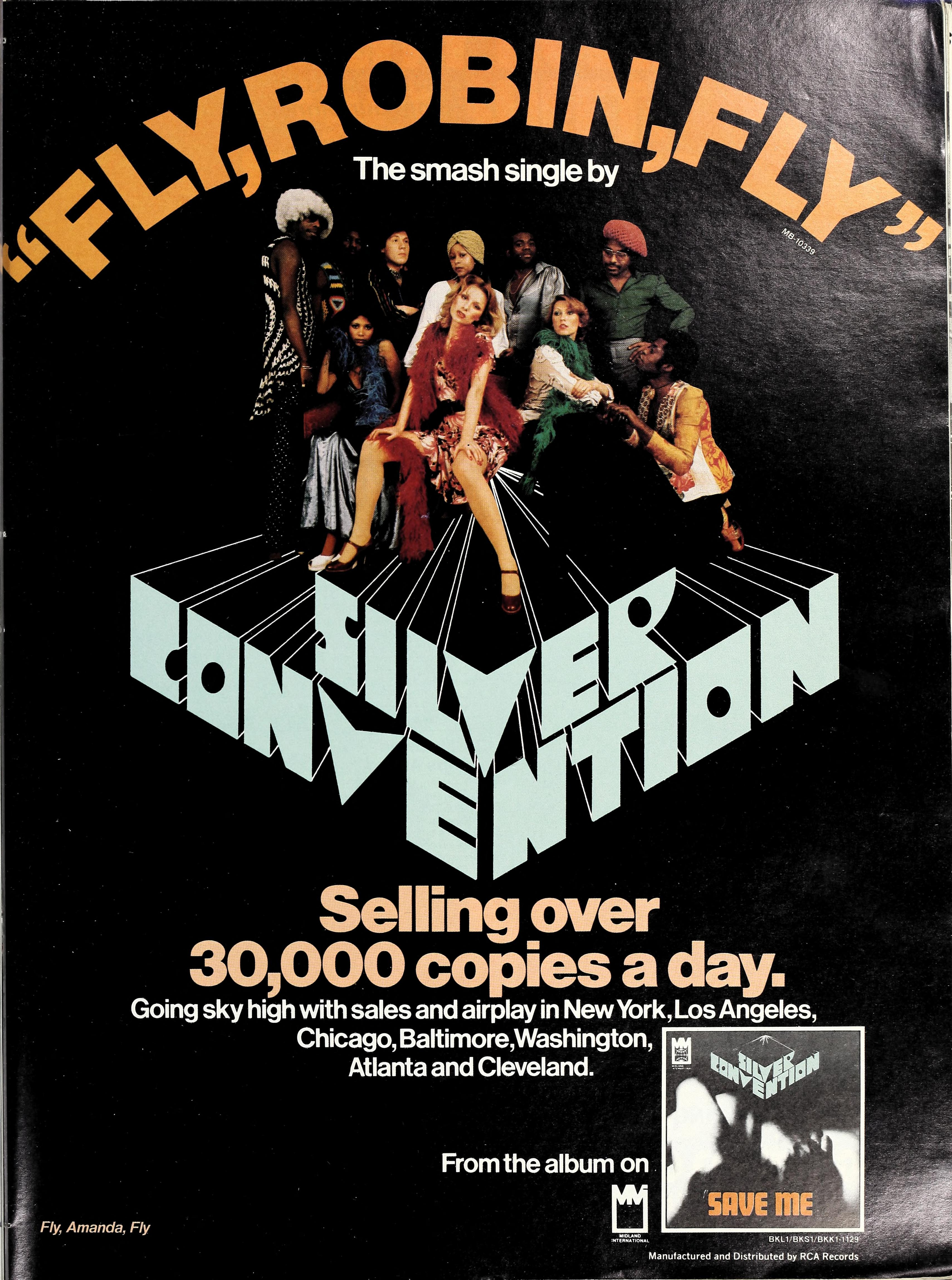
Cashbox advertisement, October 18, 1975

They scored two major US and Canadian hit singles. "Fly, Robin, Fly", of which the complete lyrics consisted of only six different words (fly, robin, up, to, the, sky), maintained three weeks at #1 in late November and early December 1975, and won the group a Grammy Award for Best R&B Instrumental Performance. It sold over one million copies and was awarded a gold disc by the R.I.A.A. in December 1975. Initially the song was titled "Run, Rabbit, Run", changed by the writers moments before the recording took place. Their next success "Get Up and Boogie", which also consisted of only six different words (Get, Up, And, Boogie, That's, Right), hit #1 in Canada on June 15, 1976, had 3 weeks at #2 in the U.S in June 1976 and also peaked at #7 in the UK, in May 1976.

Their next release, "No No Joe," only scored #60 in September 1976. The further singles released by the trio attempted to duplicate the sound that had made them successful briefly, but they were only minor successes. At this time, Linda G. Thompson left the group and was replaced by New Yorker Rhonda Heath, who was chosen over other hopefuls at an open casting call.

Michael Kunze wrote the lyrics on the first two albums under the pseudonym Stephan Prager. During this time the three singers released their own solo work. McLean and Thompson achieved hit singles with "Lady Bump" and "1-2-3-4... Fire!", and "Ooh What a Night" respectively. Wulf's solo effort was only a moderate success.

Silver Convention represented Germany in the Eurovision Song Contest 1977 with "Telegram", finishing eighth. The entry had only English lyrics (with considerably more words than their past hits), but was allowed to enter in spite of the language rule being reintroduced this year, because the song had been chosen to represent Germany before the reintroduction was announced. In 1994, Rhonda Heath returned to Eurovision, providing backing vocals and keyboards for the German entry "Wir geben 'ne Party" performed in German by Mekado. This entry did better than Silver Convention's effort, finishing third out of the 25 entries in Dublin.

With a new producer, John Davis, and a revised line-up of singers (Suzie McClosky a.k.a. Zenda Jacks, Rhonda Heath, and Ramona Wulf), Silver Convention was successful again during 1978 with the album Love in a Sleeper. The 12" single release from the LP was "Spend the Night With Me" backed with "Mission To Venus".

Levay also worked with Giorgio Moroder, and Kunze began work with Jim Steinman. The solo careers of the three singers ended quickly and they left the music industry, since interest in the disco scene was declining during this period. Levay and Kunze later collaborated on the Vienna productions of the musicals Elisabeth, Mozart! and Rebecca.

== First U.S. concert for Braniff Airways ==
Silver Convention's first United States Concert was held at Dallas, Texas, in the North Hangar of Braniff International Airways Operations and Maintenance Base at Dallas Love Field Airport on Wednesday evening, February 23, 1977. The group had travelled from Acapulco, Mexico, where they had also performed on February 19, 1977 for Braniff during a special party dubbed Three Evenings To Remember. The airline threw the promotional party to announce its new Ultra Elegance Campaign and debut new air and ground crew uniforms by American fashion designer Halston. Silver Convention penned a song titled "Ultra Ultra" specifically for Braniff to commemorate the carrier's new inflight service; this song they performed in Acapulco and at the Dallas concerts. The day after the Love Field concert, the group travelled to Philadelphia, Pennsylvania, to tape an interview for The Mike Douglas Show.

== Cover versions of their songs ==
American jazz flautist Herbie Mann recorded a cover version of "Fly, Robin, Fly" for his 1976 album, Bird in a Silver Cage, which was co-produced and arranged by Sylvester Levay. The Australian/British string quartet Bond also recorded a version of "Fly, Robin, Fly" for their 2004 album, Classified. In 2003, German lifestyle company Apartment20 produced a version of "Fly, Robin, Fly", which featured Ramona Wulf on lead vocals and in the video for the song.

"Thank You, Mr. DJ", a B-side of the "No, No, Joe" single was sampled by the Australian alternative rock band Regurgitator for the track "The Song Formally Known As" from their second album, Unit.

== Discography ==
- Save Me (1975)
- Get Up and Boogie (1976)
- Madhouse (1976)
- Summernights (1977)
- Telegram (1977)
- Love in a Sleeper (1978)

== See also ==
- List of number-one hits (United States)
- List of artists who reached number one on the Hot 100 (U.S.)
- List of number-one dance hits (United States)
- List of artists who reached number one on the U.S. Dance chart

Preceded by Les Humphries Singers with Sing Sang Song	Germany in the Eurovision Song Contest; 1977	Succeeded by Ireen Sheer with Feuer
