= Fly, Robin, Fly =

1975 English language song from Germany

- German and Yugoslav vinyl picture sleeve

Single by Silver Convention

from the album Save Me
- B-side: "Tiger Baby"; "I Like It"
- Released: September 1975
- Genre: Disco; Euro disco; pop
- Length: 3:50 (single version); 5:32 (album version)
- Label: Jupiter; Midland International
- Songwriters: Sylvester Levay; Stephan Prager
- Producer: Stephan Prager

Silver Convention singles chronology
"Always Another Girl" (1975)	"Fly, Robin, Fly" (1975)	"Get Up and Boogie" (1976)

Music video
- "Fly, Robin, Fly" (TopPop, 1975) on YouTube

"Fly, Robin, Fly" is a song by the German disco group Silver Convention from their debut studio album Save Me (1975). Sylvester Levay and Stephan Prager wrote the song and Prager produced it. "Fly, Robin, Fly" was released as the third single from Save Me in September 1975, reaching number one on the United States Billboard Hot 100. Due to the success of "Fly, Robin, Fly", Silver Convention became the second German act to have a number one song on the American music charts (after Bert Kaempfert). The song received a Grammy Award for Best R&B Instrumental Performance at the 18th Annual Grammy Awards in 1976.

== Composition ==
"Fly, Robin, Fly" carries the distinction of being a Billboard Hot 100 chart-topper with only six words: the chorus simply repeats "Fly, Robin, fly" three times with an ending of "Up, up to the sky". During a segment on VH1's 100 Greatest Dance Songs, it was revealed that the original working title was "Run, Rabbit, Run".

== Chart and commercial performances ==
In the United States, the song rose to number one on the Billboard Hot 100 in November 1975, staying there for three weeks. It was both preceded and succeeded by "That's the Way (I Like It)" by KC and the Sunshine Band. The single was also number one on the Billboard Soul Singles Chart for one week. "Fly, Robin, Fly" also spent three weeks at number one on the Dance/Disco Chart. In Canada, the song also reached the pole position in the charts, hitting number one in the RPM Top Singles Chart on 17 January 1976, knocking the Bay City Rollers' "Saturday Night" from the top slot, managing to keep it for a single week before being replaced by C. W. McCall's "Convoy" a week later. As of February 1976, the single sold 1.5 million copies in the United States.

== Charts ==
=== Weekly charts ===
Chart (1975–1976)	Peak position
Australia (Kent Music Report)	11
Austria (Ö3 Austria Top 40)	9
Belgium (Ultratop 50 Flanders)	3
Canada Adult Contemporary (RPM)	6
Canada Top Singles (RPM)	1
France (IFOP)	28
Germany (GfK)	3
Netherlands (Dutch Top 40)	5
Netherlands (Single Top 100)	8
New Zealand (Recorded Music NZ)	16
Norway (VG-lista)	8
Sweden (Sverigetopplistan)	16
Switzerland (Schweizer Hitparade)	5
UK Singles (Official Charts)	28
US Billboard Adult Contemporary	6
US Billboard Hot 100	1
US Billboard Hot Disco Singles	1
US Billboard Hot Soul Singles	1
US Cash Box Top 100	1
US Record World Singles	1

=== Year-end charts ===
Chart (1975)	Rank
Australia (Kent Music Report)	89
Canada Top Singles (RPM)	103
US Cash Box Top 100	44

Chart (1976)	Rank
Belgium (Ultratop 50 Flanders)	47
Canada Top Singles (RPM)	31
US Billboard Hot 100	14

== Certifications ==
Region	Certification	Certified units/sales
Canada (Music Canada)	Gold	75,000^{^}
United States (RIAA)	Gold	1,000,000^{^}
^{^} Shipments figures based on certification alone.

== Uses ==
The song appeared in the 1997 drama film Boogie Nights.

In April 2016, students and teachers from Methodist College, a Hong Kong secondary school, produced an educational "campus television" video by introducing four geometry methods in determining the congruence of triangles, through a song which lines to the tune of "Fly, Robin, Fly". Resembling the members of the band, choreographed arm and legs movements are also featured by the Hong Kong students, in order to introduce the mathematical concepts. The clip became a viral video which garnered over 800,000 views on Facebook within a week.

== See also ==
- List of Billboard Hot 100 number-one singles of 1975
- List of Cash Box Top 100 number-one singles of 1975
- List of number-one dance singles of 1975 (U.S.)
- List of number-one R&B singles of 1975 (U.S.)
- List of number-one singles of 1976 (Canada)
