= Klaus =

Klaus is a German, Dutch, Scandinavian, and Greek given name and surname. It originated as a short form of Nikolaus, a German form of the Greek given name Nicholas.

== Notable persons with the family name ==
- Billy Klaus (1928–2006), American baseball player
- Chris Klaus (born 1973), American entrepreneur
- Felix Klaus (born 1992), German football player, son of Fred Klaus
- Frank Klaus (1887–1948), German-American boxer, 1913 Middleweight Champion
- Fred Klaus (born 1967), German football player and manager, father of Felix Klaus
- Josef Klaus (1910–2001), Chancellor of Austria 1966–1970
- Karl Ernst Claus (1796–1864), Russian chemist
- Václav Klaus (born 1941), Czech politician, former President of the Czech Republic
- Walter K. Klaus (1912–2012), American politician and farmer

== Notable persons with the given name ==
- Brother Klaus, Swiss patron saint
- Klaus Augenthaler (born 1957), German football player and manager
- Klaus Badelt (born 1967), German composer
- Klaus Barbie (1913–1991), German SS-Hauptsturmführer and Holocaust Perpetrator
- Klaus Bargsten (1911–2000), German captain and sole survivor of the sunken U-boat U-521 in World War II
- Klaus Berntsen (1844–1927), Danish politician
- Klaus Dede (1935–2018), German writer
- Klaus Dibiasi (born 1947), Italian sports diver
- Klaus Doldinger (1936–2025), German saxophonist and film music composer
- Klaus Emmerich (director) (1943–2026), German film director and screenwriter
- Klaus Emmerich (journalist) (1928–2021), Austrian journalist
- Klaus Fischer (born 1949), German footballer
- Klaus Flouride (born 1949), bassist of the Dead Kennedys
- Klaus Fuchs (1911–1988), German theoretical physicist and atomic spy
- Klaus Gerhart (born 1965), outdoorsman and photographer
- Klaus Iohannis (born 1959), Romanian politician
- Klaus Isekenmeier (born 1975), German decathlete
- Klaus Kinkel (1936–2019), German politician
- Klaus Kinski (1926–1991), German actor
- Klaus Lemke (1940–2022), German film director
- Klaus Köchl (born 1961), Austrian politician
- Klaus Lage (born 1950), German musician
- Klaus Lanzarini (born 1977), Italian freestyle swimmer
- Klaus Laser (1942–2020), German actor
- Klaus Löwitsch (1936–2002), German actor
- Klaus Mäkelä, (born 1996) Finnish conductor and cellist
- Klaus Meine (born 1948), lead singer of German hard rock band Scorpions
- Klaus Mertens (born 1949), German singer
- Klaus Nomi (1944–1983), German entertainer
- Klaus Ofczarek (1939–2020), Austrian opera singer and actor
- Klaus Perwas (born 1971), German basketball coach and former player
- Klaus Petersen (born 1951), Danish modern pentathlete
- Klaus Rinke (1939–2026), German artist
- Klaus Rogge (born 1979), German rower
- Klaus Schilling (1871–1946), German experimenter in Nazi human concentration camp experiments executed for war crimes
- Klaus Schulten (1947–2016), computational biophysicist
- Klaus Schulze (1947–2022), German electronic music composer and musician
- Klaus Schwab (born 1938), German professor who founded the World Economic Forum
- Klaus Seltenheim (born 1984), German politician
- Klaus Tennstedt (1926–1998), German conductor
- Klaus Voormann (born 1938), artist, musician, and record producer who was associated with the early days of The Beatles
- Klaus Voussem (born 1970), German politician
- Klaus Wowereit (born 1953), German politician

=== Pen name ===
- Klaus Maria Brandauer (born 1943), theatrical name of Klaus Georg Steng, Austrian actor

== Characters ==
- Klaus from Beyblade: Metal Masters
- Klaus from Xenoblade Chronicles and Xenoblade Chronicles 2
- Klaus from Mother 3
- Klaus Baudelaire from A Series of Unfortunate Events
- Klaus from Hotel Transylvania: The Series
- Klaus Daimler from The Life Aquatic with Steve Zissou
- Klaus Hargreeves from The Umbrella Academy
- Klaus Heisler from American Dad!
- Klaus Mikaelson from The Vampire Diaries and The Originals
- Klaus von Wolfstadt from Maiden Rose
- Baron Klaus Wulfenbach from Girl Genius
- Klaus from Klaus
- Klaus from Animal Crossing: New Horizons
- Major Klaus Heinz von dem Eberbach from From Eroica with Love
- Klaus, the titular character from Forklift Driver Klaus – The First Day on the Job
- Klaus from Don't Starve

== See also ==
- Claus, a variant of the name
- Klaukkala, Finnish village, whose name is partly based on the name Klaus
- Klavs, a variant of the name
- Kloyz, a Yiddish school
- Klaus, a 2019 animated film
