= Allan (magazine) =

Japanese bishōnen magazine (1980–1984)

- Cover of the first standalone issue of Allan
- Frequency: Bimonthly
- Publisher: Minori Shobo
- First issue: October 1980
- Final issue: February 1984
- Country: Japan
- Language: Japanese

Allan (Japanese: アラン; stylized in all caps) was a Japanese magazine published by Minori Shobo. Launched in October 1980 as a special issue of the anime magazine Gekkan Out, it became a standalone publication in June 1983, and was discontinued in February 1984.

Allan was one of the earliest commercial publications in Japan to focus on male-male romance for a female audience, and was centered on the concept of tanbi (lit. 'aestheticism'). It launched at a time when June, the first commercial male-male romance magazine for a female audience in Japan (and which was also centered on the concept of tanbi), had temporarily ceased publication. Several artists and writers that contributed to June, including Yasuko Aoike and Akemi Matsuzaki, also contributed to Allan.

== History ==
The anime magazine Gekkan Out was launched by publishing company Minori Shobo in 1977, in response to the popularity of the anime series Space Battleship Yamato (1974–1975). A year later, Comic Jun (later renamed June) was launched by Sun Publishing. June was the first commercially published Japanese magazine dedicated to male-male romance fiction for a female audience, publishing this genre under the editorial concept of tanbi (lit. 'aestheticism'). As a result of low sales, June temporarily ceased publication in 1979. (Note: June resumed publication in 1981, and remained in circulation until 1995.)

The first issue of Allan was published in October 1980 as a special issue of Gekkan Out. The issue was priced at ¥490 (US$4.46), and featured an illustration by Yasuko Aoike and a gravure (pin-up photograph) of David Bowie as a bound-in poster. Starting from the June 1983 issue, it was launched as a bimonthly (every two months) publication independent from Gekkan Out. Allan ceased publication with its February 1984 issue.

== Content ==
Allan primarily published manga, novels, gravures, and editorials relating to bishōnen (lit. "beautiful boys", a term for androgynous men) that were centered around the concept of tanbi. It also published reader submissions in a section titled Zen'nihon Bishōnen Senshuken (全日本美少年選手権; 'All-Japan Bishōnen Championship'). Although manga only constituted a small percentage of the editorial content of Allan, the manga series Bokura wa Seinen Tanteidan (ぼくらは青年探偵団; 'We are the Young Detectives') by Akemi Matsuzaki became the magazine's signature work.

The magazine also published interviews with public figures, including Yū Aku, Akihiro Miwa and Mitsuhiko Kuze, and special features on topics such as kabuki and Shinjuku Ni-chōme. The Ni-chōme feature, for example, contained the results of a survey conducted at a bar owned by Ito Bungaku, editor of the gay men's magazine Barazoku.

=== Contributors ===
Artist Akemi Matsuzaki contributed illustrations, posters, and covers to Allan, and serialized her manga series Bokura wa Seinen Tanteidan from the first until the final issue of the magazine. Many of the writers and artists who had contributed to June, such as Yasuko Aoike, Yayoi Takeda, and Hikomi Kugake, also contributed to Allan. Manga artist Akiko Hatsu, who coined the term yaoi with Yasuko Sakata, made her professional debut as a manga artist in Allan.

== Impact ==
Allan was one of the earliest commercial publications in Japan to focus on gay romance for a female audience. Launched at a time when June, which was also centered around the concept of tanbi, had ceased publication, Allan came to effectively dominate the field of professional male-male romance publishing in Japan during the period of June's absence. Writer Miki Ishida notes that while Allan dealt with the same tanbi themes of June, it did so from a different perspective – notably, including features on the lives of real-life gay men – which she credits with helping to revitalize and diversify tanbi as a genre.
