= New Wave (manga) =

Artistic movement in Japan

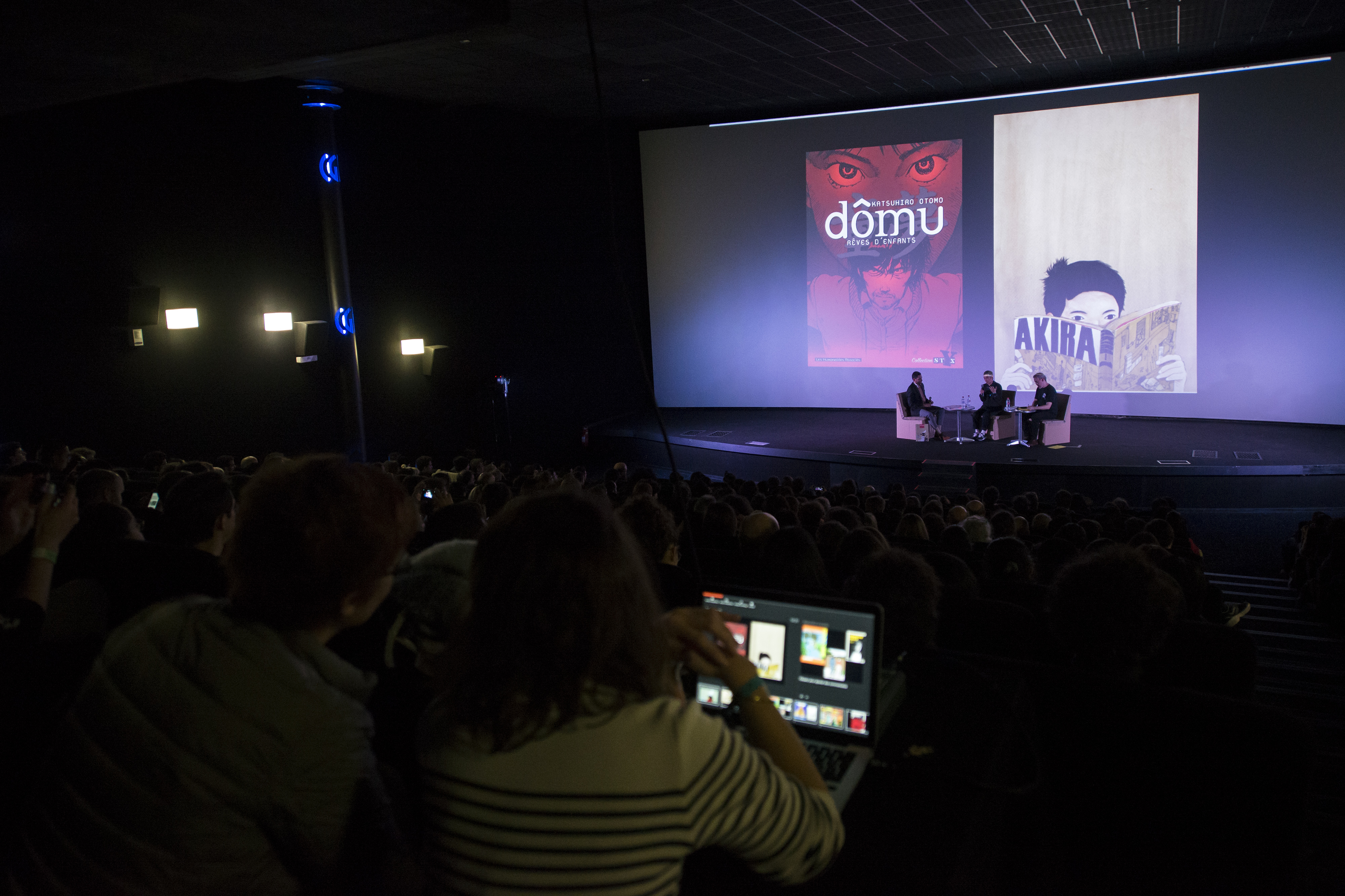
- Tribute to the Works of the Father of the New Wave Katsuhiro Otomo – Domu: A Child's Dream and Akira
- Years active: Late 1970s – Early 1980s
- Location: Japan
- Major figures: Katsuhiro Otomo, Noma Saeba, Hisaichi Ishii, Fumi Saimon, Yukio Kawasaki, Fumiko Takano, Jun Ishikawa, Hideo Azuma, Keizō Miyanishi, Yōsuke Takahashi, Hiroshi Masumura, Daijiro Morohoshi Hisashi Sakaguchi, Youji fukuyama, Hisauchi Michio

New Wave (Japanese: ニューウェーブ, Hepburn: Nyū Uēbu) was a movement within the Japanese manga industry during the late 1970s and early 1980s. Critics together with artists challenged the by then conventional frameworks of shōnen manga, shōjo manga and gekiga by introducing innovative means of expression and non-gendered approaches to manga. While artists differed vastly in terms of style, the visual language of Katsuhiro Otomo, new approaches to science fiction, and a less feminine approach to shōjo manga were the main New Wave characteristics. The short-lived movement was centered around smaller manga magazines that were initiated by manga critics, but had a wide impact onto the development of mainstream manga.

== History ==
Until the 1960s, Japan's manga industry was divided into four distinct genres: shōnen manga, shōjo manga as well as gekiga and seinen manga, with only a few experimental magazines like Garo and COM deviating from this pattern.

Towards the late 1970s, several minor manga magazines and anthologies were launched by the members of Meikyū, a collective of manga critics that was active in the doujinshi scene and founded the Comiket. These publications, such as June, Peke, Shōnen Shōjo SF Manga Kyōsaku Taizenshu, Bessatsu Kisōtengai SF Manga Taizenshu, and Mankinchō, featured works both by established manga artists and emerging amateur doujinshi artists. The artists featured in these magazines were recognized for breaking the conventions of existing manga genres and working outside of the gendered framework of shōjo and shōnen manga.

The term "New Wave" appeared first in a manifesto by Tomohiko Murakami published in the October 1979 issue of the magazine Comic Again (formerly Peke). Murakami used the term used to collectively describe a new form of exceptional individuality that defied traditional manga categorization. Katsuhiro Otomo was counted among the prominent figures in this movement. Other artists like Noma Saeba, Hisaichi Ishii, Fumi Saimon, Yukio Kawasaki, Fumiko Takano, Jun Ishikawa, Keizō Miyanishi, Yōsuke Takahashi, Hiroshi Masumura and Daijiro Morohoshi were also associated with the New Wave, even though their styles varied widely.

With growing popularity, several artists transitioned to various seinen manga magazines by major publishers such as Kodansha's Young Magazine and Shogakukan's Big Comic Spirits. Also the science fiction boom of the early 1980s started to decline. With this, the New Wave movement gradually subsided, leading to the discontinuation of the minor manga magazines.

== Style ==
Science fiction was an important genre for the movement, as several of the magazines associated with the movement focused on science fiction manga. Kentarō Mizumoto explains that this might be related to the overall boom in science fiction publishing at the time, "giving relatively minor writers a place to play an active role." He also argues that new wave science fiction writers like Philip K. Dick and J. G. Ballard might have brought about a change in methodology and consciousness among manga artists, as they moved towards philosophical, speculative or absurdist approaches to science fiction rather than established space opera tropes. Mizumoto quotes Hideo Azuma's Fujōri Nikki (1979) as an example, as they would function as a parody of science fiction and were thus the essence of new wave science fiction.

The New Wave often blurred the lines of the gendered expectations of the manga industry with its distinct categories of female-oriented shōjo manga and male-oriented shōnen manga, inspired by the Year 24 Group that had introduced new approaches, genres and visual elements to shōjo manga earlier in the 1970s. According to Mizumoto, shōjo manga became "less girly". Homosexuality and sex were not taboo topics anymore and the New Wave led to the establishment of the boys' love genre, especially through the impact of June magazine. Yasuko Sakata, Akimi Yoshida and Fumiko Takano all published in commercial shōjo magazines like Petit Flower and LaLa, but also in some of the magazines associated with the New Wave such as June (Sun Publishing), Manga Shōnen / Duo (Asahi Sonorama), Girls Comic (Shufu no Tomosha), Pretty Pretty (Sevensha) and Grapefruit (Shinshokan). Mizumoto mentions Fumiko Takano's symbolist short story "Zettai Anzen Kamisori" and Keiko Takemiya's Kaze to Ki no Uta, both published in June, as especially influential.

Also magazines with a male readership in mind became more open to the aesthetics of shōjo manga. It became common for female artists like Fumi Saimon and Rumiko Takahashi to publish in seinen manga magazines like Young Magazine and Big Comic Spirits. The erotic magazine Manga Burikko under editor Eiji Ōtsuka was conscious of the New Wave, with artists like Kamui Fujiwara. Hisashi Eguchi: When I was editor of Comic Cue, I was trying to make it a magazine of the children of the New Wave, having guys like Taiyo Matsumoto and Minetaro Mochizuki contributing. Recently, though, I also feel the New Wave in, say, Daisuke Igarashi.

Also magazines of the punk and new wave music subcultures like Bikkuri House and Takarajima published manga, often blending the line between illustration and manga. Yoshikazu Ebisu and Shigeru Tamura were among the artists publishing in these magazines.

== Impact ==
Some of the artists associated with the New Wave, for example Katsuhiro Otomo, became popular in commercial magazines throughout the 1980s and the visual techniques of the New Wave became assimilated in the mainstream. Artists like Kyoko Okazaki, Minetarō Mochizuki, Sensha Yoshida, Taiyō Matsumoto, and Usamaru Furuya were influenced by the New Wave. Kentarō Mizumoto also sees the influence of the movement on the later magazines Comic Cue and Manga Erotics F.

== Reception ==
Manga critic Eiji Ōtsuka, himself considered to be part of the movement, criticized the New Wave movement, noting that both creators and readers focused more on the "methods" rather than the "content" being portrayed. As a result, the movement produced numerous imitations, becoming part of the commercialized manga landscape. Ōtsuka compared the New Wave with the Year 24 Group that transformed shōjo manga in the 1970s. However, he regarded the latter as more profound in transforming the manga industry compared to the superficial changes brought about by the New Wave.

Manga artist Hideo Azuma rejected being labeled as part of the New Wave, when manga critic Natsume Fusanosuke invited him and other artists to appear in a newspaper article Fusanosuke wanted to publish about the New Wave in 1981. Fusanosuke later commented on Twitter that the framework of the New Wave was done by young people without much academic background in theory.

== See also ==
- History of manga
- Japanese New Wave
