= Toshie Kihara =

Japanese manga artist (born 1948)

Toshie Kihara 木原 敏江
- Born: February 14, 1948 (age 78) Meguro, Tokyo, Japan
- Area: Manga artist
- Notable works: Mari to Shingo; Yume no Ishibumi
- Awards: Shogakukan Manga Award (1985)

Toshie Kihara (木原 敏江, Kihara Toshie; born February 14, 1948, in Meguro, Tokyo) is a Japanese manga artist and a member of the Year 24 Group. She made her professional debut in 1969 with the short story Kotchi Muite Mama! in Bessatsu Margaret. She is best known for her manga series Mari to Shingo, serialized from 1977 to 1984 in LaLa, which follows a romance between two young men at the start of the Shōwa era. Several of her manga series have inspired musicals performed by the all-female Takarazuka Revue, including Angélique, an adaptation of the novels by Anne Golon; Torikaebaya Ibun, an adaptation of the Heian era tale Torikaebaya Monogatari; and Ōeyama Kaden.

In 1985, Kihara won the 30th Shogakukan Manga Award in the shōjo (girls') category for Yume no Ishibumi, a multi-volume collection of short stories with shōnen-ai (male-male romance) themes.

In 2017, to commemorate Kihara's 48th anniversary as a manga artist, Kawade Shobo Shinsha published a book containing a chronological list of all of her works; a lengthy interview with Kihara about her career; a round-table discussion between Kihara and her fellow Year 24 Group members, Moto Hagio and Yasuko Aoike; and contributions from other celebrated manga artists, such as Riyoko Ikeda and Yasuko Sakata.

The same year, Kihara's first solo art exhibition was held at the Span Art Gallery in Ginza, Tokyo, Japan, from November 3 to November 14, 2017. The exhibition was also held at the Niigata City Manga House in Niigata, Japan, from June 21 to October 9, 2018. Another exhibition dedicated solely to Mari to Shingo was held at the Span Art Gallery in two parts: first, from April 26 to May 8, 2019, and second, from June 22 to July 9, 2019. During its run, Kihara made several appearances at the gallery to sign autographs.

== Works ==
- Yume no Ishibumi (夢の碑)
- Angélique (アンジェリク)

- An adaptation of Anne Golon's Angélique novel series

- Ten made Agare! (天まであがれ！)
- Suishō to Velvet (水晶と天鵞絨)
- Iwa o Makura ni Hoshi wo Daki (岩を枕に星を抱き)
- Junkin no Dōwa (純金の童話)
- Tsue to Tsubasa (杖と翼)
- Ginshōsui (銀晶水)
- Gin'iro no Romance (銀色のロマンス)
- Itoshiki Gen Tsukushiteyo (愛しき言つくしてよ)
- Diamond Godzillan (ダイヤモンド・ゴジラーン)
- Shijūshichi Moji (四十七文字; "Forty-seven Characters")
- Ōji-sama ga Īno! (王子さまがいいの！)
- Emerald no Kaizoku (エメラルドの海賊)
- Kihara Toshie Zenshū (木原敏江全集; "Complete Works of Toshie Kihara")
- Furufuru (ふるふる)
- Mugonka (無言歌)
- Kadentha (花伝ツァ)
- Shiroi Mori (白い森; "White Forest")
- Hinata e Hikage eno Romance (日なたへ日かげへのロマンス)
- Odeai Asobase (お出合いあそばせ)
- Mugen Kaden (夢幻花伝)
- Hana no Na no Himegimi (花の名の姫君)
- Sieglinde no Komoriuta (ジークリンデの子守歌; "Sieglinde's Lullaby")
- Dōshitano Daisy? (どうしたのデイジー？)
- Last Tango (ラストタンゴ)
- Āra Waga Tono! (あ-らわが殿!)
- Ginga Sō Nano! (銀河荘なの！)
- Bernstain (ベルンシュタイン)
- Torikaebaya Ibun (とりかえばや異聞)
- Nue (鵺)
- Classic na Safari (クラシックなサファリ)
- Chitose no Saikai (千歳の再会)
- Ugetsu Monogatari (雨月物語)
- Ōeyama Kaden (大江山花伝)
- Taishō Roman Tanteitan (大正浪漫探偵譚)
- Tasogare no Cinderella (黄昏のシンデレラ)
- Fuchi to Narinu (渕となりぬ)
- Fūrenki (風恋記)
- Mari to Shingo (摩利と新吾; "Mari and Shingo")
