= Year 24 Group =

Group of influential Japanese shōjo manga artists

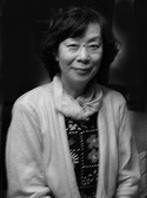
Moto Hagio, one of the primary artists associated with the Year 24 Group

The Year 24 Group (Japanese: 24年組, Hepburn: Nijūyo-nen Gumi) (Note: The name Fabulous Year 24 Group (花の24年組, Hana no Nijūyo-nen Gumi; lit. "Year 24 Group of Flowers") is also used. In English-language contexts, the names The Magnificent Forty-Niners and The Fabulous Forty-Niners are also occasionally used.) is a grouping of female manga artists who heavily influenced shōjo manga (Japanese girls' comics) beginning in the 1970s. While shōjo manga of the 1950s and 1960s largely consisted of simple stories marketed towards elementary school-aged girls, works by members of the group significantly developed shōjo manga by expanding it to incorporate new genres, themes, and subject material. Narratives and art styles in shōjo manga became more complex, and works came to examine topics such as psychology, gender, politics, and sexuality. Manga produced by the Year 24 Group brought the shōjo category into what scholars have described as its "golden age".

As a largely notional group, the criteria used to determine the membership of the Year 24 Group varies. Individuals who have been associated with the Year 24 Group include Yasuko Aoike, Moto Hagio, Riyoko Ikeda, Toshie Kihara, Minori Kimura, Yumiko Ōshima, Nanae Sasaya, Keiko Takemiya, Mineko Yamada, and Ryōko Yamagishi.

== Etymology ==
"The Year 24 Group" is not a proper name for a specific collective of artists, but rather a name used by critics, journalists, and academics to retroactively refer to the generation of female manga artists who emerged in the early 1970s and contributed to the growth and development of shōjo manga. Though the precise first use and originator of the term is unknown, it was widely in use by the end of the 1970s, notably in manga critic Tomohiko Murakami's 1979 book Twilight Times: Dőjidai no Manga no Tameni.

"Year 24" refers to Shōwa 24 – the 24th year of the Shōwa era in the Japanese calendar, or 1949 in the Gregorian calendar. The number thus ostensibly references the year its members were born in, although only a small number of individuals associated with the Year 24 Group were actually born in 1949.

== History ==
=== Context ===
During the 1950s and 1960s, shōjo manga largely consisted of simple stories marketed towards elementary school-aged girls. Stories were typically sentimental or humorous in tone, and were often centered on familial drama or romantic comedy; manga scholar Rachel Thorn notes that these stories frequently focused on "passive, pre-adolescent heroines in melodramatic situations, often involving separation from a mother." Authors of shōjo manga were typically men who began their careers in the genre before migrating to shōnen manga, or manga for boys.

During the 1960s, the manga industry responded to an aging readership and increased competition from television by increasing the production of manga magazines and diversifying the content of their publications. Shōnen manga during this period innovated and found new audiences through the concept of gekiga, which sought to use manga to tell serious and grounded stories aimed at adult audiences; shōjo manga largely stagnated, and was generally perceived as frivolous and of low quality by critics. Though the increase in manga production during the 1960s allowed female manga artists such as Hideko Mizuno, Toshiko Ueda, and Yoshiko Nishitani to launch their careers, the sclerotic conventions and editorial standards of shōjo manga publishing of this era prevented them from achieving the degree of innovation seen in shōnen manga.

=== The "Ōizumi Salon" and professional debut ===
By the early 1970s, the majority of the male artists who had launched their careers in shōjo manga in the 1960s had migrated to shōnen manga, giving way to a new generation of female shōjo manga artists. These new artists drew inspiration from a diversity of sources, including European literature and cinema, American rock and roll culture, and the Bildungsroman genre. Magazines such as Shūkan Shōjo Comic that granted more editorial freedom to creators provided outlets for these artists to publish their work.

The so-called "Ōizumi Salon", a rented house in Ōizumigakuenchō, Nerima, Tokyo that manga artists Moto Hagio and Keiko Takemiya shared as roommates from 1971 to 1973, came to be an important gathering point for members and affiliates of the Year 24 Group. Hagio and Takemiya made the house available to shōjo artists for use as living and working space, allowing them to both bond socially, share ideas and influences, and collaborate on manga. Notable artists who visited the Ōizumi Salon include Shio Satō, Yasuko Sakata, Yukiko Kai, Akiko Hatsu, Nanae Sasaya, Mineko Yamada, Aiko Ito, Michi Tarasawa, and Misako Nachi. The Ōizumi Salon has been compared to Tokiwa-sō, an apartment building that housed multiple influential manga artists in the 1950s and 1960s.

In 1972, two major works of shōjo manga were published: The Rose of Versailles by Riyoko Ikeda, and The Poe Clan by Hagio. Widely acclaimed upon their release, the works attracted the attention of critics who had to that point largely ignored the shōjo genre. These works paved the way for a wave of "literary manga" (roughly analogous to Western graphic novels), which due to their aesthetic and literary qualities, brought shōjo manga into what has been described by scholars as its "golden age".

=== Innovation of the shōjo genre ===
The 1970s would see the publication of multiple works by the Year 24 Group that significantly contributed to the development of shōjo manga. Notable works in addition to the aforementioned Rose of Versailles and Poe Clan include Shiroi Heya no Futari (1971) by Ryoko Yamagishi, The Heart of Thomas (1974) by Moto Hagio, They Were Eleven (1975) by Hagio, From Eroica With Love (1976) by Yasuko Aoike, Kaze to Ki no Uta (1976) by Keiko Takemiya, and Toward the Terra (1977) by Takemiya. These works expanded shōjo manga to incorporate new subgenres, including science fiction, historical fiction, adventure fiction, horror, fantasy, and same-sex romance (both male-male and female-female). These stories typically focused on complex narratives that emphasized the psychology and interiority of their protagonists, and addressed controversial topics and subject material.

Works that openly explored politics and sexuality came to be a defining trait of Year 24 Group manga. While pre-war girls magazines had forbidden discussion or depictions of these topics, cultural shifts in the 1970s allowed manga artists to depict these concepts more freely. Members of the Year 24 Group were shaped by the counterculture of the 1960s, particularly the New Left student protest movements; Ikeda was a member of the Japanese Communist Party, and the group generally was "empowered by the sense of youthful rebellion and iconoclasm at the time." This realist style, notably in the manga of Takemiya, Ōshima, and Hagio, contributed to the popularity of shōjo manga among general audiences.

Works by the group often examined issues of gender through their focus on male protagonists, a departure from earlier shōjo manga that focused on female heroines exclusively. These protagonists were often bishōnen – literally "beautiful boys", distinguished by their androgynous appearances – or were characters that blur gender distinctions, such as the crossdressing Oscar François de Jarjayes of The Rose of Versailles. Works focused on male protagonists were often homosocial or homoerotic in nature, and helped lay the foundation for the boys' love genre (male-male romance, also known as "BL" or yaoi).

Stylistically, the Year 24 Group created new conventions in panel layout by departing from the rows of rectangles that were the standard at the time, creating borders that were abstracted or removed entirely. These so-called "non-narrative" layouts focus on communicating the emotions of the characters, and often superimpose and overlap backgrounds, characters, and dialogue to create an effect that breaks the standard narrative structure. For example, Ikeda is noted for using panel compositions that remove spatial landmarks, while Hagio often removes panels entirely to merge characters and backgrounds into a single composition.

By the end of the 1970s, shōjo manga "had ceased to be a monolithic and homogeneous genre," and the innovation introduced to shōjo manga by the Year 24 Group was firmly entrenched in the medium. The trend towards specialization and narrowly targeted readerships through subgenres continued into the 1980s and 1990s, as shōjo works targeted towards young adult and adult women continued to proliferate.

== Members ==
As a largely notional group, the criteria used by scholars to determine the membership of the Year 24 Group varies. Some define its membership as only the most popular and "radical" shōjo artists of the era – typically considered to be Hagio, Ōshima, and Takemiya, occasionally referred to using the acronym "HOT". Others exclude Ikeda, such as sociologist Shinji Miyadai, considering her instead as representative of the "popular novel style" of shōjo manga alongside manga artists Machiko Satonaka and Yukari Ichijo. Others use an expansive definition that includes every artist who frequented the Ōizumi Salon.

=== Manga artists ===
Yasuko Aoike
Noted for her works that focus on romance, adventure, and comedy. Aoike is best known for her long-running spy parody series From Eroica with Love, serialized in Princess from 1976 to 2012. In 1991, she received the Japan Cartoonists Association Award for her series Alcazar.

Moto Hagio
Noted as "one of the most important creators to rise from the world of Japanese manga," Hagio's works were profoundly influential to the shōjo genre, introducing elements of science fiction, fantasy, and male-male romance. She has won numerous awards, and was the first shōjo manga creator to receive a Medal of Honor.

Riyoko Ikeda
Noted for her historical dramas that often featured foreign settings and androgynous characters. Ikeda's acclaimed series The Rose of Versailles was the first major commercial success in the shōjo genre, and proved the genre's viability as a commercial category.

Toshie Kihara
Noted for her historical manga, Kihara is best known for her manga series Mari and Shingo; published in LaLa from 1977 to 1984, it follows a romance between two young men at the start of the Shōwa era. In 1984, she received the Shogakukan Manga Award in the shōjo category for her series Yume no Ishibumi.

Minori Kimura
Produced manga noted for their realistic themes and subject material, such as sexuality, health, and work. Made her professional debut at the age of 14 with Picnic, a manga published in Ribon.

Yumiko Ōshima
Best known for her series Wata no Kunihoshi, which won the 1978 Kodansha Manga Award and popularized the "catgirl" character archetype. Ōshima's works are noted for their use of outwardly "cute" aesthetic styles to explore deeper themes and subject material.

Nanae Sasaya
Noted for her works focusing on suspense, black comedy, and "offbeat romances". Her series Superior Observation by an Outsider won a Japan Cartoonists Association Award in 1990.

Keiko Takemiya
Influential in the science fiction, fantasy, and male-male romance genres. Takemiya's 1970 one-shot manga In The Sunroom is noted as the first commercially-published manga in the shōnen-ai genre, while her 1976 series Kaze to Ki no Uta is regarded as a seminal work of that genre. She received two Shogakukan Manga Awards in 1979, for Kaze to Ki no Uta and Toward the Terra.

Mineko Yamada
Noted for her works in the science fiction and fantasy genres. Her long-running Armageddon series, consisting of multiple one-shot stories, was serialized across multiple magazines from 1977 to 2002.

Ryōko Yamagishi
The creator of Shiroi Heya no Futari, noted as the first work in the yuri genre. In 1983, she won the Kodansha Manga Award in the shōjo manga category for Hi Izuru Tokoro no Tenshi.

=== Other associated individuals ===
Norie Masuyama
A friend of Takemiya's and Hagio's who is credited with introducing them to magazines such as Barazoku and other literature, music, and films that would come to heavily influence their manga.

Junya Yamamoto
An editor at Shogakukan who published the works of many Year 24 Group members, regardless of their controversial subject material or unconventional art styles.

== Analysis ==
=== Impact ===
Initial critical reaction to works published by the Year 24 Group was almost invariably positive, as many critics who had previously ignored shōjo manga seriously considered the genre for the first time through the group's work. Critics noted how works by the group considered women as human beings, rather than as the idealized young girls of early shōjo manga. Comiket, the world's largest comic convention, was founded by the dōjinshi circle Meikyu to study the works of various manga artists, including Hagio and other members of Year 24 Group. Critic Osamu Takeuchi argues that the shift in shōjo manga that the Year 24 Group represented is an example of how shōjo manga in the 1970s was changing "from simple entertainment to a vehicle of self-expression for the author"; Eiji Ōtsuka compares this shift to the discovery of interiority in early Meiji fiction, while Inuhiko Yomota sees the Year 24 Group as analogous to New Wave cinema.

The group's works were only marginally representative of all shōjo manga of the 1970s; artists such as Suzue Miuchi continued to create "conventional" shōjo manga, even at the peak of the Year 24 Group's popularity. Works by the Year 24 Group have nevertheless come to be regarded by critics as "classics" of the genre, both for their aesthetic and thematic quality, and for the "visual grammar" they established which influenced subsequent generations of manga artists. New generations of female manga artists also began to create manga about male-male romance following the emergence of the Year 24 Group, which became formalized in the boys' love genre.

Many of the artist assistants and amateur artists who attended the Ōizumi Salon, such as Yasuko Sakata, Akiko Hatsu and Shio Satō, went on to become professional manga artists. These artists are sometimes referred to as the "Post Year 24 Group" (ポスト24年組, Posuto Nijūyo-nen Gumi).

=== Criticism ===
One of the Year 24 Group's first dissenting critics was Hiroshi Aramata, who has criticized the group's "deification" and believes the group "should not be singled out or treated as special." Manga scholar Deborah Shamoon concurs that while the works of the Year 24 Group are "often characterized as revolutionary," she argues that the ascendance of the group "was less a counterculture takeover and more a recognition by (male) editors that stories penned by female artists were and still are more popular with girl readers than works by male artists and hence more profitable."

The largely notional nature the Year 24 Group has led to scholarly disagreement over who constitutes its membership, and the usefulness of "the Year 24 Group" as an organizing category in and of itself. Academic Tomoko Yamada has criticized the use of the term "Year 24 Group" to describe shōjo manga artists of the 1970s, arguing that the designation lumps women together based on their age, that it may perpetuate a bias against earlier shōjo manga artists, that it is overly inclusive of all female baby boomer manga artists, and that some manga artists considered part of Year 24 Group may reject the label.

== See also ==
- New Wave (manga)
