= Nishitani =

Nishitani is a Japanese surname. Notable people with the surname include:

- Keiji Nishitani (西谷 啓治, 1900–1990), Japanese philosopher of the Kyoto School
- Yoshiko Nishitani (西谷祥子, born 1943), shōjo manga artist
