= Daniel F. Akin House =

Historic house in Minnesota, United States

- U.S. National Register of Historic Places
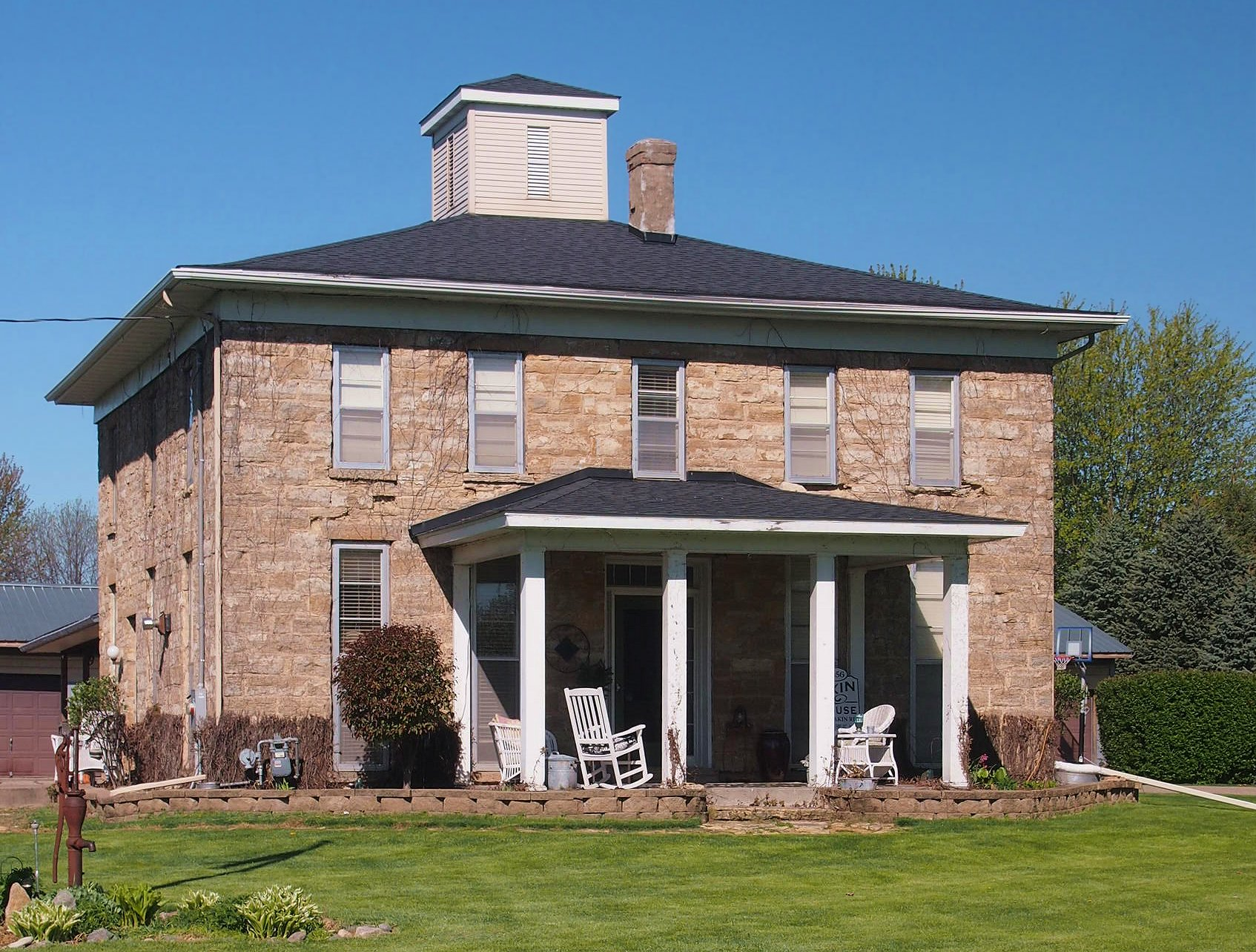
- The Daniel F. Akin House from the east

- Location within Minnesota Location within the United States
- Location: 19185 Akin Road, Farmington, Minnesota
- Coordinates: 44°40′18″N 93°10′18″W
- Built: 1856
- Architect: Daniel F. Akin
- Architectural style: Italianate
- NRHP reference No.: 79001223
- Added to NRHP: December 31, 1979

The Daniel F. Akin House is a historic house located at 19185 Akin Road in Farmington, Minnesota.

== Description and history ==
The Italianate two-story farmhouse was built around 1860 from locally quarried limestone, and features a hipped roof with cupola on top. It is an example of the "Country Homes" style of Andrew Jackson Downing, a pioneer in American landscape architecture.

It was added to the National Register of Historic Places on December 31, 1979.
