= List of From Eroica with Love characters =

Characters from a manga

The long-running manga series From Eroica with Love by Yasuko Aoike first appeared in 1976 in the Japanese magazine Viva Princess. The series revolves around the adventures of Dorian Red, Earl of Gloria, an openly gay English lord who is an art thief known as "Eroica", and Major Klaus Heinz von dem Eberbach, an uptight West German NATO major.

== The Eroica Gang ==
In stealing things, Dorian Red Gloria, Earl of Gloria is aided by his gang of thieves, who also manage his household. These characters are also inspired by the band Led Zeppelin. For the heists the band often uses sleeping gas on the guards. Dorian sometimes lets his gang perform the heists themselves, but sometimes he participates. When told he needn't be there in person for a heist, he replies: "Occasionally, I like to feel the excitement". In Achilles' last stand they go by submarine, in A Thousand Kisses and Love In Greece by Zeppelin. The exact number of thieves is unknown, but in Hallelujah Express Dorian orders 20 tickets for the trip to Rome. They disguise themselves as nuns, from the covenant of Cecilia.

=== Dorian Red Gloria, Earl of Gloria ===
Dorian Red Gloria, Earl of Gloria, is the protagonist of the series and leader of The Eroica Gang. His custom is to introduce himself using his full name and title: Dorian Red Gloria, the Earl of Gloria. His name is a play on the Oscar Wilde character Dorian Gray, whilst his pseudonym "Eroica" is Italian for "heroic" and the title of several pieces of art and music, among them Beethoven's Eroica Symphony.

Looks: He is blond, with long, curly hair and blue eyes. When Sugar Plum first meets him she compares him to "Apollo with his magnificent locks of gold". His forelock is shaped like a heart. He is tall and slender, but strong. On seeing parts of his body, Leopard Solid seems shocked and thinks "A body better than mine?" According to Bonham, he is the "very embodiment o' pomp". At least once Klaus calls him "Earl Goldilocks". Aoike physically modelled him after Robert Plant of the band Led Zeppelin, of which she is a fan.

Sexuality and love interests: A major aspect of Dorian's personality is his flamboyant homosexuality, which is viewed with various degrees of disgust (or admiration) by those around him. By his own statement: "I don't particularly fancy thin men", said to Major Klaus Heinz von dem Eberbach. However, Dorian's first love interest in A Thousand Kisses, Professor Caesar Gabriel, is no less thin than Klaus. Also Dorian surrounds himself with plenty of thin-looking men that he also appears to like. He does say that he and Klaus are "mortal enemies, so to speak", while discussing the major with Maya Bulgakova.

His attraction to Caesar seems instant, as he gives him admiring looks, comments on a shared taste in art and how Caesar is just his type. However, when Caesar and his friends stake out the Tate Gallery in hope of catching Eroica, Dorian's interest seems to peak. "You came here to catch me? What a splendid chap you are. I think I like you all the more". He considers Caesar "A beauty among beauties. No matter what delights I may find in the world, my collection would be incomplete without him". Towards the end of A Thousand Kisses Dorian uses blackmail to get Caesar to kiss him, while Catullus' poem of a thousand kisses is quoted. However, Caesar faints after only a few kisses and Dorian lets him go. In Achilles' Last Stand he even refers to him as a 'comely child' and remarks that he does not appear to have grown any more manly. The trio never appears again after Achilles' Last Stand. Dorian later, instead falls in love with his enemy, Iron Klaus. Unfortunately, when he tells Klaus, he gets punched for it, as Dorian's confession is public.

While often seen in women's clothing, he states that he is not personally inclined to cross-dressing.

Profession: Dorian is a successful art thief, a profession arising from his natural talent for stealing and his passion for beautiful objects. After performing a theft, Dorian leaves behind ransom cards signed with his catchphrase: "From Eroica with love. Good luck." When Klaus first investigates him, he concludes that "he's good – very good". When the Achilles Statue he hunted in Achilles' Last Stand is put in the Musée du Louvre, he's not overly concerned: "I can choose to steal it whenever I fancy". That he is one of the best thieves is further acknowledged in that he is asked to host the Rogues' Gallery, and he claims to be a capable fencer.

Likes and Dislikes: Dorian likes beautiful things. "I'm always searching all over the world for works of beauty to make them mine". The "worth" of something is of less importance to him than how beautiful it is: when a painting he likes is called a fraud he steals it anyway, simply because he still likes it, as he is a well-known art collector.

Personal policy: "Whatever I want, I get". He can break his word, depending on the circumstances, as proven when he promises Maya to help her in exchange for the Buddha, but has no intention of letting her hurt G.

Family: His father is dead. His mother, who abandoned him at the age of 13, is alive, and he has three sisters.

Age: unknown. In the very first scene with him, in London's National Gallery, Sugar Plum compares him to "Cupid in the form of a gorgeous 20-year-old". When Professor Caesar Gabriel profiles the leader of the Eroica gang, he theorizes: "They're led by an intelligent young man, perhaps 22 or 23 years old. Using the name 'Eroica' indicates narcissism, so he's probably very handsome".

Cars: In both A Thousand Kisses and Iron Klaus he is seen in a car identified as a Lamborghini. In Love In Greece he drives a red Maserati. While going to Palmyra he drives a jeep, saying that "Just once I wanted to roar through the desert in a jeep".

Present in titles:
A Thousand Kisses
Iron Klaus
Achilles' Last Stand
Love in Greece
Dramatic Spring
In'shallah
Hallelujah Express
Alaskan Front

=== James ===
Member of The Eroica Gang. Miserly and jealous accountant. In the early work, he has a slightly neater, longer appearance than in later work. His greed and strangeness also progress as the series develops. He appears highly jealous of Dorian's love interests, trying to keep them apart.

Towards the end of "A Thousand Kisses", Dorian Red Gloria, Earl of Gloria orders him to shoot Leopard Solid and Sugar Plum. Dorian intends to blackmail Professor Caesar Gabriel with this and Caesar folds - but James goes ahead anyway, trying to kill them, because Caesar cried and "The Earl always ignores me when I cry", and he wants to prove to Dorian that he can do more than "push buttons on a calculator". Nothing similar ever happens again.

Apart from his obsession with Dorian (he buys him new underwear, so he can have his old ones, to wear), James is preoccupied with profit and money. He says about a heist with no monetary compensation that he'd be better off dead and he is always devoted to the god of money. Dorian often exploits James’ weakness for Dorian himself, most often to use his accounting skills. In contrast, he is not always good at judging worth, as he sells one of Klaus's guns for a fifth of its real worth.

Characteristics: He has black hair (in some images leaning more towards dark brown) and his forelock almost always covers one of his eyes.

He disguises himself as Dorian's bedouin wife in Inshallah. An Iranian border guard comments that "she" isn't attractive and that he understands why Dorian would prefer a man (having seen him embrace and kiss Klaus).

Present in titles:
A Thousand Kisses
Iron Klaus
Achilles' Last Stand
Love in Greece
Dramatic Spring
In'shallah
Hallelujah Express
Alaskan Front
Veni, Vidi, Vici

=== Bonham ===
Member of The Eroica Gang. He gives the impression of the reliable, solid member of the gang, also slightly older than most of them, approaching middle-age.

Hair: Blond with mustache.

Present in titles:
Achilles' Last Stand
Love in Greece

=== Beck ===
Member of The Eroica Gang.

Present in titles:
A Thousand Kisses

=== Jonesy ===
Member of The Eroica Gang.

Present in titles:
Alaskan Front

== NATO ==
Major Klaus Heinz von dem Eberbach's crew of 26 subordinates are each named after a letter of the alphabet: Agent A, Agent B, Agent G, and Agent Z appear in the series most frequently. Collectively they are known as "The Alphabet". In the very beginning, some Alphabets change appearance, possibly also changing identities. A is in second command, B is generally portrayed as a bumbling clown, G enjoys cross-dressing, and Z, the youngest, is Klaus's favorite. All of Klaus's subordinates live in fear of his ire and his constant threats to reassign them to Alaska: "Anyone who disagrees will find himself posted in Alaska". They work for NATO's intelligence division and are stationed in Bonn.

=== Major Klaus Heinz von dem Eberbach ===
Major Klaus Heinz von dem Eberbach, a.k.a. "Iron Klaus", is a protagonist who acts as a foil to Dorian Red, Earl of Gloria, and, later, as his love interest. He is a West German intelligence agent serving in NATO. He is nicknamed "Iron Klaus" by enemy characters for his notoriously high number of successful missions and is apparently feared as one of the best intelligence agents NATO has, as confirmed by his boss. In Dramatic Spring he is also referred to as a Neo-Nazi specialist (he considers them an embarrassment to Germany and the free world).

Klaus's missions involve averting international incidents and collecting intelligence and are frequently disrupted by Dorian. Klaus reacts to Dorian's flirting and confessions of love with violence and pronounced homophobia. In the beginning, he even refers to Dorian as his sworn enemy and he threatens Dorian's men when trying to get Dorian to hand him the Achilles statue. Despite this, he is occasionally cordial with Dorian when they have worked together on a mission successfully and he gets him iodine when he is hurt.

Klaus has not been sent to capture Dorian, stating that "Art theft lies outside my jurisdiction – No wonder I didn't really know about him" (though later on he teases Giuliani for not knowing Eroica). He also encourages him to hurry up and steal what he is after, so he can get out of Klaus's life. However, he has no problems using the troops to protect the Eberbach collection when Dorian threatens to steal it, to protect a national treasure.

Name: The "von dem" is part of the last name and should not be omitted, according to German naming rules. Despite this, he is often called just "Major Eberbach" or "Major" in the manga. He is also called "Iron Klaus" - according to his boss this name came from "the other side" (unspecified) and was given to him "out of respect and fear". The Chief on occasion calls him Major "Ramrod". In Inshallah he uses the name Jhabil Rhasa'ail, son of Muhammed. His Agents sometimes calls him "Major It's-A-Mission". He is also sometimes called "The Eternal Major", referring to his not having risen in rank for so long.

Family: His father is alive and his mother is dead. He is of noble family – his Chief mentions "blueblood". Klaus is head of the family, which is related to the German branch of the House of Habsburg.

The Eberbach Collection: The family has a collection of art masterpieces, referred to as "The Eberbach Collection". Dorian thinks that the collection must be among the best in Germany, and Klaus confirms its importance, saying that the Eberbach collection is considered a part of the cultural heritage of Germany and that each and every item is a priceless cultural treasure. One piece is work by "Jakob Zaizeneggar" (Jakob Seisenegger).

Personal policy: "I always accomplish my mission". Dorian also characterizes him as a man who "does what needs to be done".

Residence: While he works in Bonn, Eberbach (Baden) is presumed to be his home town. (Author Aoike Yasuko is an honorary citizen of Eberbach). In Alaskan Front James mentions going to the major's castle "in Bonn". The major lives in a castle, complete with servants and Herr Hinkel, the butler.

Cars and tanks: In Iron Klaus he chases Dorian in a modified, fully automatic Leopard B-1. He knows the Panzerlied by heart (or at least to the third verse). He says he prefers to drive Mercedes or BMWs.

Faith: When Dorian offers to swear on something on the Bible, Klaus finds the prospect of Dorian doing so appalling. In Veni Vidi Vici Klaus says he is an atheist, but he respects religious people, especially nuns.

Languages: Speaks Italian "enough". Seen reading Le Monde, a French magazine. Speaks Russian in Madan no Shashu.

Present in titles:
Iron Klaus
Achilles' Last Stand
Love in Greece
Dramatic Spring
In'shallah
Hallelujah Express
Veni, Vidi, Vici
Alaskan Front

=== Agent A ===
NATO agent. Major Klaus Heinz von dem Eberbach's second in command. Rank is sergeant major. Married. Mostly seen with Agent B. In Alaskan Front dives for the treasure in Tazlina Lake.

In Iron Klaus, Agent A has curly hair. In later issues his look changes to short, straight hair. Possibly the first Agent A was replaced by a new Agent A (possibly the previous Agent B). In Hallelujah Express, Dorian takes A's wallet, for "safekeeping".

Present in titles:
Iron Klaus
Achilles' Last Stand
Love In Greece
Veni, Vidi, Vici
Alaskan Front

=== Agent B ===
NATO agent. Most often seen with Agent A. He is a bit of a clown characters and also somewhat out of shape. In Alaskan Front dives for the treasure in Tazlina Lake.

In Iron Klaus, Agent B has straight hair. In later issues his look changes to curly hair. Possibly the first Agent B was replaced by a new Agent B (possibly the previous Agent A).

Present in titles:
Iron Klaus
Achilles' Last Stand
Dramatic Spring
Veni, Vidi, Vici
Alaskan Front

=== Agent C ===
NATO agent. In Alaskan Front dives for the treasure in Tazlina Lake.

Present in titles:
Achilles' Last Stand
Dramatic Spring
Alaskan Front

=== Agent D ===
NATO agent.

Present in titles:
Achilles' Last Stand

=== Agent E ===
NATO agent.

Present in titles:
Dramatic Spring

=== Agent F ===
NATO agent. In Alaskan Front dives for the treasure in Tazlina Lake.

Alaskan Front

=== Agent G ===
NATO agent. Transvestite. He adores both Major Klaus Heinz von dem Eberbach and Dorian Red Gloria, Earl of Gloria. Goes undercover as Yanis Phaerikis's sister, Daphne Phaerikis, but Dorian easily sees through his disguise. At first Klaus is dead set to send G to Alaska, regardless of what happens, but he doesn't.

Present in titles:
Love In Greece
Hallelujah Express
Alaskan Front
James I - The Coin King

=== Agent H ===
NATO agent. Plays Major Klaus Heinz von dem Eberbach's wife in In'shallah, dressed in a burqa. He thinks Agent G or Agent Z would be more suitable for the role. One of the border guards tells Klaus his wife is ravishing, though.

Present in titles:
In'shallah

=== Agents I through K ===
NATO agents. In Alaskan Front they dive for the treasure in Tazlina Lake.

Alaskan Front

=== Agent L ===
NATO agent. On the trip through the desert he wears sunglasses, which Major Klaus Heinz von dem Eberbach orders him to remove as "You're not a comic book hero."

Present in titles:
In'shallah

=== Agents M through Y ===
NATO agents. In Alaskan Front they dive for the treasure in Tazlina Lake.

Alaskan Front

=== Agent Z ===
NATO agent. Youngest or newest of Major Klaus Heinz von dem Eberbach's agents. He appears to be something of a favorite of Klaus's. Not good at Arabic (when asked by Klaus he knows one word). In Hallelujah Express Klaus calls him a "naive rookie" and "as innocent as they come". In Alaskan Front he writes a letter to his sister, telling her to give his love to their parents and grandparents. In Alaskan Front dives for the treasure in Tazlina Lake.

Present in titles:
In'shallah
Hallelujah Express
Alaskan Front

=== The Chief ===
Major Klaus Heinz von dem Eberbach's superior in NATO. His name is unknown. He has a secretary. The impression is given that he is a little sweet on Agent G.

Present in titles:
Iron Klaus
Achilles' Last Stand
Love In Greece
Veni, Vidi, Vici
Alaskan Front

=== John Drake ===
Major Klaus Heinz von dem Eberbach names John Drake as "our Intelligence man in England".

Present in titles:
Iron Klaus
Achilles' Last Stand

=== Giovanni Stephano ===
Meets up with Major Klaus Heinz von dem Eberbach at an airforce base in Turkey. He is with the Istanbul Office (likely of NATO). From Italy. According to him, in Turkey the custom is that all business is conducted after tea.

Present in titles:
In'shallah

== KGB ==
As the series take place during the Cold War and Major Klaus Heinz von dem Eberbach work for NATO his missions often bring him up against various members of the KGB. Most Russians have code names referring to animals. Most often seen is Mischa the Bear Cub. He and his successors have attempted to assassinate Klaus, capture him or foil his missions several times.

=== Red Fox ===
Sends information by telegraph to Mischa (but is answered by Polar Bear). Not seen.

Present in titles:
Hallelujah Express

=== Mischa the Bear Cub ===
Mischa is a reoccurring antagonist in the series. Member of the KGB, he is a previous Olympic Gold-Medalist boxer.

Present in titles:
Hallelujah Express
Alaskan Front

=== Dostoyevsky, Tolstoy, Turgenev ===
These are three of Mischa the Bear Cub's agents, members of the KGB.

Present in titles:
Hallelujah Express

=== Polar Bear ===
A member of the KGB who sends information by telegraph to Red Fox in Hallelujah Express, but not seen.

Present in titles:
Hallelujah Express

=== Maya Bulgakova ===
Comes to Athens, Greece, possibly on KLM Flight 801, which is mentioned in the manga, but not explicitly as her flight. Skilled spy, has the reputation of the Mata Hari of KGB. When Dorian meets her, he calls her a "fair slav maiden". He estimates that she carries either a PPK or a Beretta in her purse and draws the conclusion that she is an east-block spy. She calls him a pretentious prat. She does not realize his homosexuality, implying that his KGB-file lacks this information. She promises to have a clerk correct this mistake. She thinks that the world is going to rot because of "freaks like him" and finds him to be "the very picture of why capitalism is evil" and decides that he deserves to be eliminated. From Greece she takes the Trans-European Express from the Termini station to Austria.

=== William Smile ===
Code name: Katyusha. He is an undercover agent in Alaska, working the gas station.

Present in titles:
Alaskan Front

== Rogue's Gallery ==
The Rogue's Gallery is a criminal organization of which Dorian Red Gloria, Earl of Gloria, is a member.

=== Saleem Al Sabaah ===
Member of the Rogue's Gallery. Saleem is a reoccurring minor character in the series. He is an extremely rich Kuwaiti oil magnate who is also an arrogant, handsome young man. He comes into competition with Dorian Red Gloira, Earl of Gloria over various works of art they both wish to possess. Dorian finds Saleem's view of artworks as investments as repugnant, whilst Saleem later holds a grudge against Dorian for tricking him after he had been his accomplice in an art theft.

He surrounds himself with a harem of women.

=== Gian Maria Volvolante ===
Member of the Rogue's Gallery. Gian Maria is an Italian mob leader who appears in love with Dorian Red Gloria, Earl of Gloria. He surrounds himself with women who share some physical similarities with Dorian. He assists Dorian when given the chance and acts protectively towards him (or at least threatens to kill people who hurt him), and calls Dorian the star and idol of the Rogue's Gallery.

Present in titles:
Veni, Vidi, Vici

=== The Bakchials ===
Members of the Rogue's Gallery, also of the Beirut underworld. Father and son. Arabic characters. The father appears fascinated by Dorian Red Gloria, Earl of Gloria. They assist Dorian when given the chance.

Present in titles:
In'shallah

=== Gabon ===
Member of the Rogue's Gallery, one of the "good old gangsters" (but all he does now is watch old movies and TV shows). He does not go to the gallery meeting hosted by Dorian in North Downs, but opts to stay in Paris. Dorian goes to fetch him, he suggests watching From Russia With Love instead (Connery is mentioned). Klaus also goes to visit him, with only nine hours remaining until the bomb explodes. The Superman memorabilia Dorian steals for him (from a storage room at a TV station) has special thanks to special guest stars, Sachiko Kana and Minori Kimura.

Present in titles:
Dramatic Spring

== Caesar, Sugar and Leopard ==
This trio of friends appear prominently in A Thousand Kisses, also in Iron Klaus and a tiny bit in Achilles' Last Stand, but is then never seen again. They are from England and gifted with the ability to communicate telepathically with each other. All three have "extrasensory perception". They gained their powers "five summers ago", when their parents took them on a trip to Peru and they got lost in the Nasca Highlands.

They visit Lady Devlin's house in London, just prior to a very expensive painting of hers being stolen. When Detective Tarao Bannai suspects them of the crime, they decide to solve it themselves.

=== Professor Caesar Gabriel ===
First Caesar Gabriel appears to be a protagonist of the series. He is a friend of Sugar Plum and Leopard Solid.

Education: Caesar is fluent in 20 languages, and is a "virtuoso" on practically every musical instrument. He was intelligent to begin with, but after the encounter in Peru he developed into a genius. 15 doctorates.

Love interests: He first meets Dorian Red Gloria, Earl of Gloria at Lady Devlin's house in London. He has never even kissed a girl before, when Dorian kidnaps him and kisses him repeatedly. After which he falls in love with Dorian, something he admits to Major Klaus Heinz von dem Eberbach.

Profession: He works as an instructor at University of London (the university's youngest instructor). Rated "A-1 art appraisal skills". In Iron Klaus he is hired to evaluate the Eberbach collection, though this is just a front for NATO to check if he has supernatural abilities.

Age: When A Thousand Kisses starts, he is 18 years old. 18 is also the age listed for him in Iron Klaus.

Characteristics: He is tall and slender and has long, straight and blond hair and green eyes.

Present in titles:
A Thousand Kisses
Iron Klaus
Achilles' Last Stand

=== Sugar Plum ===
Sugar Plum is the first character seen, apart from a quick introduction to the three friends. She then visits the National Gallery in London (a guard recognizes her, so she appears to be a regular or memorable visitor), where her favorite work is a work by Bronzino, Venus, Cupid, Folly and Time, also called An Allegory of Venus and Cupid (or A Triumph of Venus).

She is a friend of Professor Caesar Gabriel and Leopard Solid. After the encounter in Peru her senses were significantly better. She also has the ability to see into the future. The latter she uses to foretell when the trio (and especially Caesar) is in danger, from where they "backtracks" to when interesting events will occur.

She is a talented art student.

Age: When the first volume starts, she is 16 years old.

Characteristics: Strawberry blond hair, brown eyes.

Present in titles:
A Thousand Kisses
Iron Klaus

=== Leopard Solid ===
Leopard Solid is a successful athlete, who works as a stuntman. He is a friend of Professor Caesar Gabriel and Sugar Plum. After the encounter in Peru his body changed, giving him strength and athleticism. He could "enter every Olympic sport and set superhuman world records in each one".

He eats a lot, presumably to fuel his body; Caesar says that Leopard's body is "special".

Age: When the first volume starts, he is 19 years old.

Characteristics: Dark brown hair, bordering on black. Brown eyes.

Present in titles:
A Thousand Kisses
Iron Klaus

== Agents and police ==
=== Charles Lawrence ===
British agent in the SIS. He is vain, somewhat incompetent, and extremely annoying. He admires the Major, whom he imagines to be the type of glamorous playboy spy Lawrence himself aspires to be, but dislikes Eroica, whom he says is a disgrace to Great Britain. He has black hair combed back with a forelock, and wears suits.

=== Tarao Bannai ===
INTERPOL detective. Despite that he has devoted his life to catching Eroica he is only present in two episodes. His specialty is changing outfit every other frame or so, "disguising" himself as various professions, though always given away by his dour face and frown. He strongly suspects Caesar, Sugar and Leopard of having stolen Lady Devlin's very valuable painting of Christ. Major Klaus Heinz von dem Eberbach is not particularly impressed by him: "Someone call up the zoo and have this ape taken away". He uses two guns at the same time, like others in his "two-gun gang".

Present in titles:
A Thousand Kisses
Iron Klaus

=== Lieutenant Colonel Otto Reinhart ===
Together with Professor Erlich Gunter he meets up with Major Klaus Heinz von dem Eberbach at Cologne Bonn Airport to pick up Professor Caesar Gabriel. Dorian Red Gloria, Earl of Gloria impersonated him when getting Caesar away from Klaus. Bald and embarrassed about this, usually wears a toupee.

Present in titles:
Iron Klaus

=== Professor Erlich Gunter ===
Together with Lieutenant Colonel Otto Reinhart he meets up with Major Klaus Heinz von dem Eberbach at Cologne Bonn Airport to pick up Professor Caesar Gabriel.

Present in titles:
Iron Klaus

=== Captain Sanjhiabi, Captain Azhali ===
They meet up with Major Klaus Heinz von dem Eberbach at an airforce base in Turkey.

Present in titles:
In'shallah

=== Ibrahim Arashid ===
Gedi is his code name, it means Goat. For ten years he has been NATO's man in Tehran. When Klaus orders him to find Eroica, he says he can do it within 48 hours, but Klaus refuses to give him more than 6.

=== Franco Giuliani ===
Better known as "Detective Casket". Associate with Fra Angelico. They chase crooks in a hearse. When they catch a criminal they put him in a coffin in the back of the hearse and draw a cross on the car. Klaus claims that NATO had never heard of him.

Present in titles:
Veni, Vidi, Vici

=== Special Investigator Smith ===
Picks Major Klaus Heinz von dem Eberbach up at Fairbanks Airport to assist him on his mission. Shows he has researched Klaus by providing him with a Mercedes.

Present in titles:
Alaskan Front

=== Agent Ford ===
Works for the FBI. Klaus exposes him as a KGB spy which FBI was already aware of. Codename: Comrade Kalinka.

Present in titles:
Alaskan Front

== Others ==
=== Sister Theresa ===
Sister Theresa is a nun at the school Major Klaus Heinz von dem Eberbach went to as a child. Klaus appears to have had a crush on her.

=== Herr Hinkel ===
The butler of Schloss Eberbach, where Major Klaus Heinz von dem Eberbach lives.

=== Lady Devlin ===
Lady Devlin is a famous art collector. She invited Professor Caesar Gabriel to a party in her house, where she hosts a party to show off her "Christ" by Johannes Vermeer. Supposedly the painting is worth £300.000, which she mentions repeatedly. Alas, the Christ is not a Vermeer. Caesar calls it to be a "von Muehlen" (possibly Han van Meegeren, a known forger of Vermeer?), the work of a forger. Dorian Red, Earl of Gloria, who is also present at the party, had also suspected as much.

Lady Devlin is a heavy woman who favours flora-painted dresses. Her house is large, with much art: "It's almost like a museum", Sugar says.

Present in titles:
A Thousand Kisses

=== Countess Boulanger ===
Travels on the Michaelangelo, a cruise ship going from Southampton to the Mediterranean. Possibly French, as it is mentioned that even in Paris she's considered among the richest. Travels with twenty suitcases.

Present in titles:
Achilles' Last Stand

=== Duke Boulanger ===
Present in titles:
Achilles' Last Stand

=== Yanis Phaerikis ===
He is 23 years old, a.k.a. "Prince of Greek shipping". He is the son of Papas Phaerikis, who died the year prior to the story, a "shipping tycoon". He graduated from university the year of the story. When the story starts he is just appointed president of his father's "shipping empire", which is claimed to be rivaled only by that of Onassis (Aristotle Onassis). James thinks that he looks like an imbecile (though at the time he thinks that Yanis is what tempts Dorian to want to go to Greece, which is not the case). Yanis is not very interested in the industry as such, more in disco and nice clothes. Maya Bulgakova flatters him, asking him if he is John Travolta. Dorian claims to have met him before, at Onassis parties, unclear if he lies or not, Yanis does not appear to recognize him. He parties every Saturday night. His mother was described as a bit of a “Medusa”. His father had an affair and fathered a daughter, Daphne Phaerikis. Daphne's last known whereabouts is New York City, with her mother, and at the time of the story she is 22–23 years old.

Present in titles:
Love In Greece

=== Pieter Guerten ===
Dorian tips Klaus off that a Neo-Nazi, Pieter Fritz (an alias), was loaned a considerable amount by a black market financier during the events of Dramatic Spring. He is described as "young". Expert bomb maker. Believed to have planted a bomb in England and then left for Beirut (according to Klaus, Beirut is "a regular Mecca for extremists").

Present in titles:
Dramatic Spring

=== Harlun ===
Harlun leads Dorian Red, Earl of Gloria to his contact in iron. As identification a flower is held up, identified as an Eroica, possibly an Eroica/Erotica rose. Later trades vital information to Dorian for a kiss. Harlun says that he is almost twenty and asks if he can see Dorian again in a couple of years. Dorian gives him a green emerald necklace. He tries to trade Klaus for a kiss too, but fails.

Present in titles:
In'shallah

=== Fra Angelico ===
An ex-priest, who works with Franco Giuliani.

Present in titles:
Veni, Vidi, Vici

=== Lucretia Umberto ===
When trying to tunnel to the Borgia apartment of the Vatican, Major Klaus Heinz von dem Eberbach and Dorian Red, Earl of Gloria accidentally emerges in her bathroom. Lucretia is in the bathroom, wearing only a towel. Her elder brother comes in, interrupting them and later accuses them of trying to rape her. In doing so he uses "Friends, Romans, countrymen" from Mark Antony's speech in William Shakespeare's play, Julius Caesar.

Present in titles:
Veni, Vidi, Vici
