= James F. White =

American politician (1935–2026)

James Flavian White

Member of the Minnesota House of Representatives from the 25A district
- In office January 6, 1975 – December 31, 1978

Personal details
- Born: May 13, 1935 Lakeville, Minnesota, U.S.
- Died: January 15, 2026 (aged 90) Farmington, Minnesota, U.S.
- Resting place: All Saints Catholic Cemetery, Lakeville, Minnesota, U.S.
- Party: Democratic (DFL)
- Spouse: Patricia Catherine Fischer (m. 1958; died 2022)
- Children: 7
- Education: Saint John's College; University of Minnesota
- Occupation: Funeral director; politician

James Flavian White Sr. (May 13, 1935 – January 15, 2026) was an American funeral director and politician. A member of the Democratic–Farmer–Labor party, he was a member of the Minnesota House of Representatives from 1975 to 1978.

== Life and career ==
Born to Flavian and Louise (née Gephart) White in Lakeville, Minnesota, on May 13, 1935, James Flavian White graduated from Lakeville High School in 1951 or 1953. He first attended Saint John's College before he attended the University of Minnesota, where he graduated in 1957 with a bachelor's degree in mortuary science. After graduating, White worked for his father in the funeral business founded by his grandfather. To supplement his income, he also worked for his uncle and cousins at the Gephart Furniture store in Lakeville. He bought a funeral home in Farmington, Minnesota, in 1961 or 1963, and renamed it White Funeral Home. White bought out his father's funeral business in 1972 and expanded his own business into Lonsdale, Apple Valley, and Burnsville, Minnesota. White married Patricia Catherine Fischer on June 7, 1958, at St. Nicolas Catholic Church in New Market, Minnesota. Elected as a member of the Democratic–Farmer–Labor party to the Minnesota House of Representatives in 1974, he represented Dakota County and Goodhue County as a representative of district 25A from 1975 to 1978.

His wife Patricia Catherine (née Fischer) White died on October 19, 2022. White died in Farmington on January 15, 2026, at the age of 90. He was interred at the All Saints Catholic Cemetery in Lakeville.
