= Farmington, Minnesota =

City in Minnesota, United States

Farmington
- City
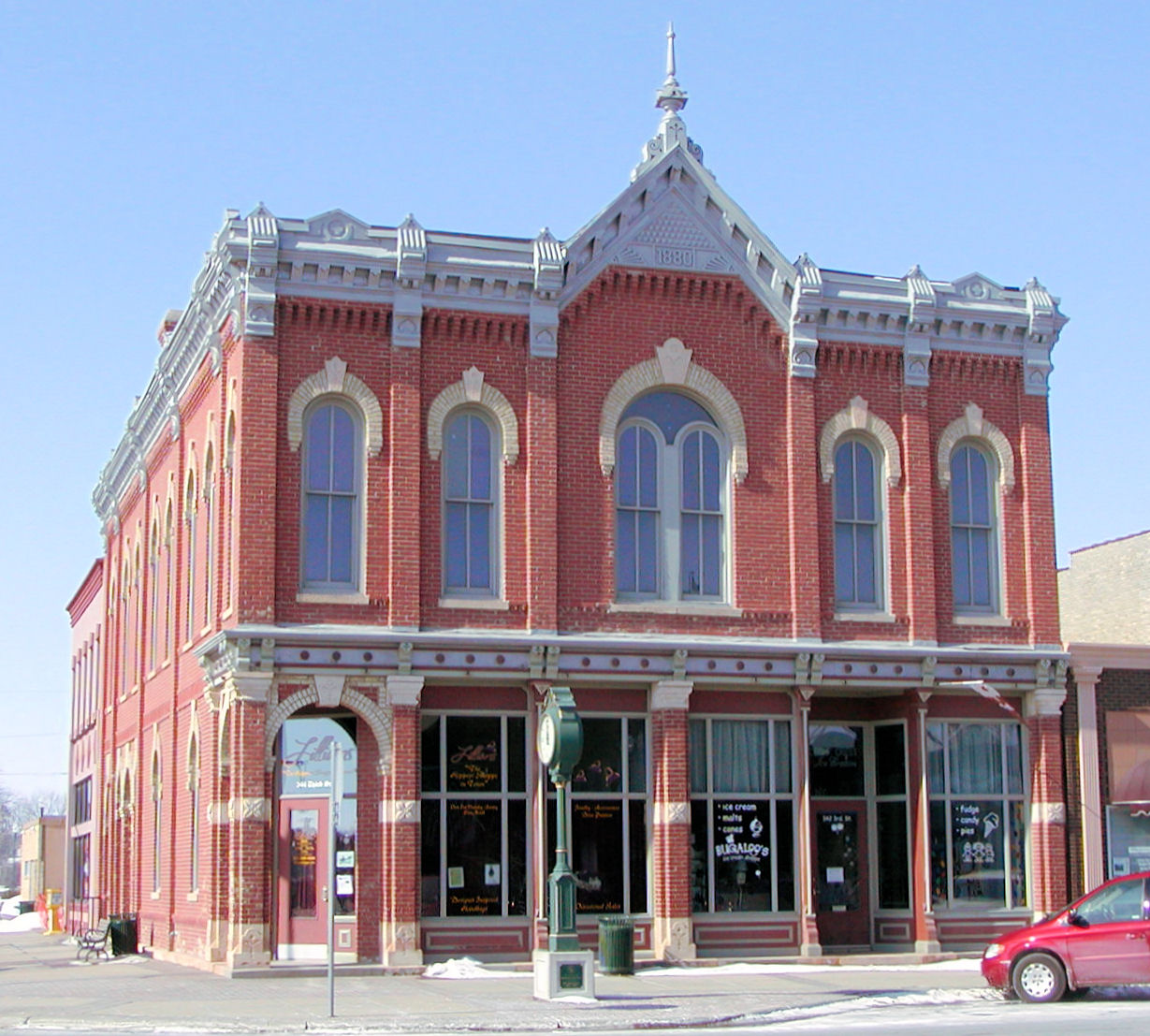
- The Exchange Bank Building in downtown Farmington
- Motto(s): "A Proud Past, A Promising Future."
- Location of the city of Farmington within Dakota County, Minnesota
- Coordinates: 44°38′57″N 93°9′8″W
- Country: United States
- State: Minnesota
- County: Dakota
- Incorporated: February 12, 1872

Government
  - Type: Mayor-Council
  - Body: Farmington City Council
  - Mayor: David Pritzlaff
  - City Council: Members: Mayor Nick Lien (acting); Councilmember Holly Bernatz; Councilmember Jake Cordes; vacant; Councilmember Steve Wilson

Area
  - Total: 14.87 sq mi (38.52 km^{2})
  - Land: 14.62 sq mi (37.87 km^{2})
  - Water: 0.25 sq mi (0.65 km^{2})
- Elevation: 902 ft (275 m)

Population (2020)
  - Total: 23,632
  - Estimate (2022): 23,566
  - Density: 1,616.3/sq mi (624.05/km^{2})
- Time zone: UTC−6 (Central (CST))
  - Summer (DST): UTC−5 (CDT)
- ZIP code: 55024
- Area code: 651
- FIPS code: 27-20618
- GNIS feature ID: 0643570
- Sales tax: 8.125%
- Website: farmingtonmn.gov

Farmington is a city in Dakota County, Minnesota, United States. The population was 23,632 at the 2020 census. It is a part of the Minneapolis-St. Paul metropolitan area. On February 5, 2026, Mayor Joshua Hoyt resigned after a tense city council meeting. Nick Lien was appointed as acting mayor on March 2, 2026.

== History ==
A Kemps processing facility in Farmington

Settlers began arriving in Empire Township, in which Farmington grew, in the early 1850s. The village of Dakota City began around the intersection of the Minnesota Central, Hastings, and Dakota railroads, and the Vermillion River. The popular city train station in Dakota City was Farmington Station and non-residents began confusing the names and calling the town Farmington. The town's name was then permanently changed to Farmington. It derives from the numerous farms near the original town site. Farmington received its village charter in 1872, making it Dakota County's second-oldest community after the county seat, Hastings.

A notable event in Farmington's history is the movement of the Dakota County Fair to Farmington in 1869. Another event, the Great Fire of Farmington on November 22, 1879, destroyed several houses, stores, a hotel, and a grain elevator in the current downtown area. The fire was started by a firework cart that was knocked over in a buggy accident. Farmington High School graduated its first class in 1884. In 1897, Farmington became one of the first communities in the United States to offer rural free mail delivery.

The town continued to grow throughout the 20th century. It celebrated its centennial in 1972. The city has since expanded to include several suburban neighborhoods north of downtown. It continues to be incorporated into the expanding Minneapolis-St. Paul metropolitan area.

Farmington is home to three properties listed on the National Register of Historic Places for Dakota County: the Daniel F. Akin House, the Church of the Advent, and the Exchange Bank Building.

=== Data Center Lawsuit ===
Between 2025 and 2026, Farmington residents organized the Coalition for Responsible Data Center Development, and filed a lawsuit to block the construction of a 2.5 million square foot data center on a former Farmington golf course. Opponents to the Farmington data center came from different political backgrounds, with many local Democrats and Republicans opposing local development. The suit is backed by the Minnesota Center for Environmental Advocacy, and represents local concerns about the center's potential use of more than 2 million gallons of water and 700 megawatts of energy per day. The land developer, Tract, stated that the center would bring 275 - 300 permanent jobs to Farmington, and yield $16-18 million per year in property tax revenue. Tract also clarified that the project's annual water usage would be capped at 50 million gallons.

== Economy ==
Farmington is the location of the Minneapolis Air Route Traffic Control Center (ZMP) and a Marigold Kemps packing plant.

== Geography ==
According to the United States Census Bureau, the city has an area of 14.94 square miles (38.69 km^{2}), of which 14.69 square miles (38.05 km^{2}) is land and 0.25 square miles (0.65 km^{2}) is water.

Farmington borders Lakeville to the west, Empire Township to the east, and the Townships of Castle Rock and Eureka to the south.

County Road 31/Pilot Knob, County Road 50, Minnesota Highway 50, and Minnesota Highway 3 are four of the main routes in Farmington.

== Community ==
The Dakota County Fairgrounds are in Farmington, with entrances on 220th Street (Ash Street) and along Highway 3 (Chippendale Avenue). The Fairgrounds is the largest in area with 360 acres (1.5 km^{2}) versus 300 for the next largest: The Minnesota State Fairgrounds. It also hosts the largest county fair attendance in the state, with average annual attendance of 125,000.

Farmington is largely residential. It can be divided into two sections, north and south of County Highway 50. The area to the north has been widely developed in the last 18 years, while the area to the south is generally known as "Downtown" and has had only two major developments in the last 20 years. The third area of the city is the North-East Farmington/West Central Empire Township developments, with large areas of development in the last five years. Farmington has many biking and walking trails within its housing communities. The trail along the Vermillion River unites the downtown, uptown, and Empire Township neighborhoods.

== Demographics ==
Historical population
Census	Pop.	Note	%±
1880	688		—
1890	657		−4.5%
1900	733		11.6%
1910	1,024		39.7%
1920	1,449		41.5%
1930	1,342		−7.4%
1940	1,580		17.7%
1950	1,916		21.3%
1960	2,300		20.0%
1970	3,104		35.0%
1980	4,370		40.8%
1990	5,940		35.9%
2000	12,365		108.2%
2010	21,086		70.5%
2020	23,632		12.1%
2022 (est.)	23,566		−0.3%
U.S. Decennial Census; 2020 Census

=== 2020 census ===
As of the 2020 census, Farmington had a population of 23,632. The median age was 35.3 years. 29.9% of residents were under the age of 18 and 8.6% of residents were 65 years of age or older. For every 100 females there were 99.4 males, and for every 100 females age 18 and over there were 96.5 males age 18 and over.

99.1% of residents lived in urban areas, while 0.9% lived in rural areas.

There were 7,906 households in Farmington, of which 44.9% had children under the age of 18 living in them. Of all households, 61.8% were married-couple households, 13.2% were households with a male householder and no spouse or partner present, and 17.7% were households with a female householder and no spouse or partner present. About 18.0% of all households were made up of individuals and 5.8% had someone living alone who was 65 years of age or older.

There were 8,065 housing units, of which 2.0% were vacant. The homeowner vacancy rate was 0.6% and the rental vacancy rate was 5.0%.

Racial composition as of the 2020 census
Race	Number	Percent
White	19,512	82.6%
Black or African American	1,003	4.2%
American Indian and Alaska Native	97	0.4%
Asian	951	4.0%
Native Hawaiian and Other Pacific Islander	11	0.0%
Some other race	529	2.2%
Two or more races	1,529	6.5%
Hispanic or Latino (of any race)	1,083	4.6%

=== 2010 census ===
As of the census of 2010, there were 21,086 people, 7,066 households, and 5,426 families living in the city. The population density was 1,435.4 inhabitants per square mile (554.2/km^{2}). There were 7,412 housing units at an average density of 504.6 per square mile (194.8/km^{2}). The racial makeup of the city was 89.8% White, 2.1% African American, 0.5% Native American, 3.6% Asian, 0.1% Pacific Islander, 1.1% from other races, and 2.8% from two or more races. Hispanic or Latino of any race were 3.6% of the population.

There were 7,066 households, of which 51.4% had children under the age of 18 living with them, 63.4% were married couples living together, 8.7% had a female householder with no husband present, 4.7% had a male householder with no wife present, and 23.2% were non-families. 17.7% of all households were made up of individuals, and 4.7% had someone living alone who was 65 years of age or older. The average household size was 2.95 and the average family size was 3.38.

The median age in the city was 31.6 years. 33.3% of residents were under the age of 18; 6.3% were between the ages of 18 and 24; 35.7% were from 25 to 44; 19% were from 45 to 64; and 5.6% were 65 years of age or older. The gender makeup of the city was 50.1% male and 49.9% female.

=== 2000 census ===
As of the census of 2000, there were 12,365 people, 4,169 households, and 3,255 families living in the city. The population density was 986.0 inhabitants per square mile (380.7/km^{2}). There were 4,233 housing units at an average density of 337.5 per square mile (130.3/km^{2}). The racial makeup of the city was 95.62% White, 0.74% African American, 0.28% Native American, 1.46% Asian, 0.02% Pacific Islander, 0.59% from other races, and 1.28% from two or more races. Hispanic or Latino of any race were 1.88% of the population.

There were 4,169 households, of which 51.0% had children under 18 living with them, 67.4% were married couples living together, 7.2% had a female householder with no husband present, and 21.9% were non-families. 16.7% of all households were made up of individuals, and 6.0% had someone living alone who was 65 or older. The average household size was 2.95 and the average family size was 3.35.

In the city, the population was spread out, with 34.0% under the age of 18, 6.5% from 18 to 24, 41.5% from 25 to 44, 12.4% from 45 to 64, and 5.6% who were 65 years of age or older. The median age was 30. For every 100 females, there were 101.7 males. For every 100 females age 18 and over, there were 99.5 males.

The median income for a household in the city was $61,864, and the median income for a family was $65,380. Males had a median income of $42,796 versus $30,373 for females. The per capita income was $22,281. About 1.3% of families and 2.4% of the population were below the poverty line, including 2.6% of those under age 18 and 9.5% of those age 65 or over.

== Education ==
Farmington schools are operated by ISD 192 and enroll about 6,900 students. The district range includes Farmington, eastern Lakeville, and the Townships of Castle Rock, Empire, and Eureka. The Farmington Senior High School mascot is Pouncer the Tiger and the school colors are orange and black, with white occasionally included.

== Politics ==
Farmington is in Minnesota's 2nd congressional district, represented by Angie Craig. It is represented in the Minnesota Senate by District 58 Senator Zach Duckworth and in the Minnesota House by District 58B Representative Drew Roach.

=== Presidential elections ===
Precinct Results
Year	Republican	Democratic	Third parties
2020	52.1% 6,410	45.2% 5,562	2.7% 322
2016	53.8% 6,178	36.3% 4,161	9.9% 1,141
2012	54.4% 6,073	43.4% 4,847	2.2% 238
2008	52.5% 5,398	45.6% 4,692	1.9% 200
2004	58.3% 5,431	40.7% 3,793	1.0% 95
2000	54.4% 3,267	40.1% 2,406	5.5% 335
1996	37.4% 1,468	49.4% 1,937	13.2% 520
1992	32.5% 1,013	39.5% 1,231	28.0% 873
1988	50.3% 1,233	49.7% 1,216	0.0% 0
1984	52.1% 1,127	46.9% 997	0.0% 0
1980	44.2% 979	46.7% 1,034	9.1% 200
1976	44.3% 868	53.7% 1,051	2.0% 40
1968	43.9% 578	52.6% 692	3.5% 46
1964	37.1% 431	62.7% 728	0.2% 3
1960	54.0% 614	45.9% 522	0.1% 1

== Notable people ==
- Shauna Grant, pornographic actress and nude model
- Drew Helleson, National Hockey League player
- Walter K. Klaus, Minnesota state legislator and farmer
- Mike Markuson, American football coach
- Steve Strachan, former member of the Farmington City Council, former member of the Minnesota House of Representatives, former sheriff of King County, Washington.
- James F. White, Minnesota state legislator
