= Church of the Advent (Farmington, Minnesota) =

Historic church in Minnesota, United States

- U.S. National Register of Historic Places
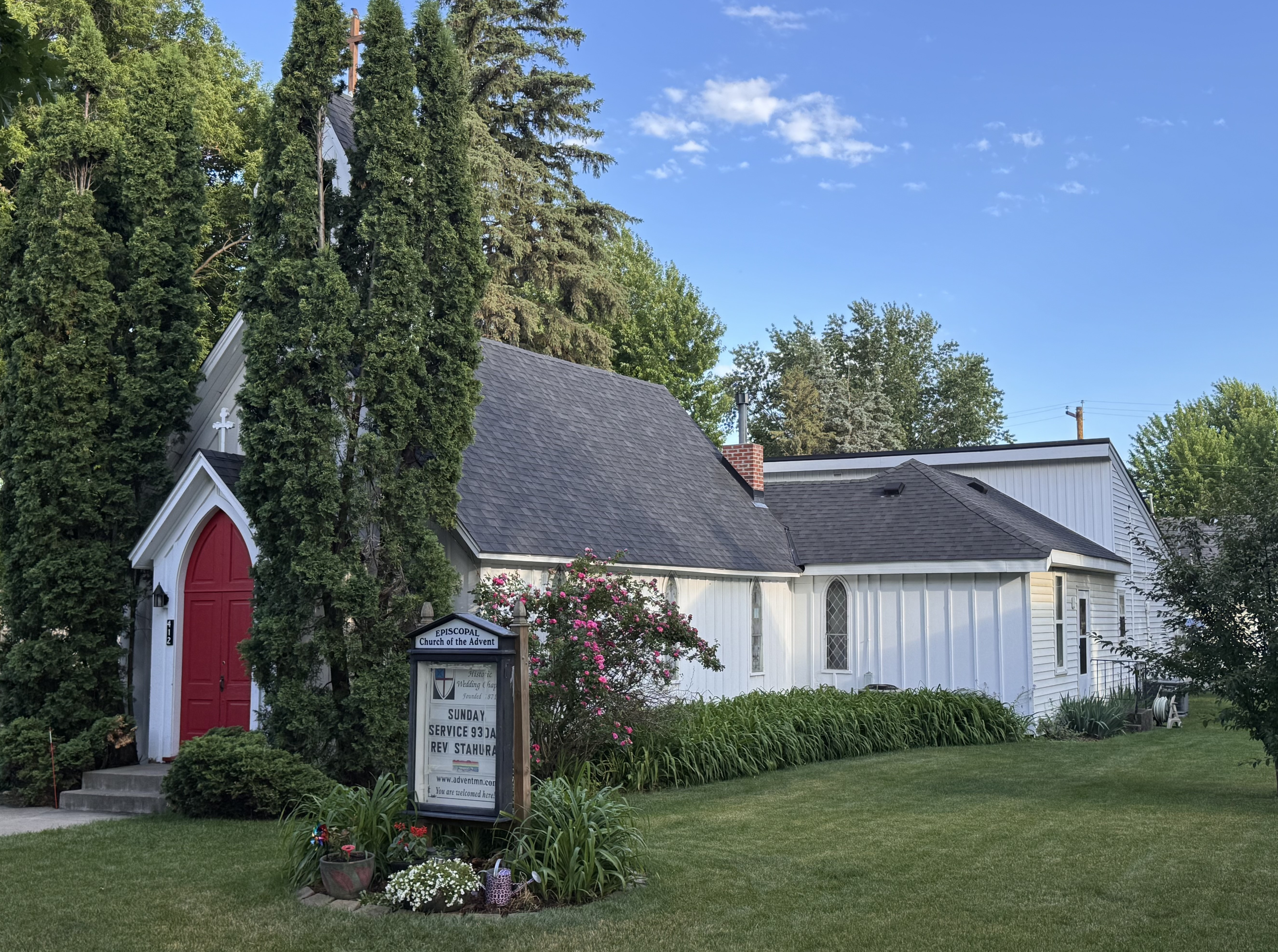
- The church from the north in 2026

- Location within Minnesota Location within the United States
- Location: Farmington, Minnesota
- Coordinates: 44°38′20″N 93°8′33″W
- Built: 1872
- Architect: Richard Upjohn; John H. Thurston
- Architectural style: Carpenter Gothic
- NRHP reference No.: 79001225
- Added to NRHP: December 31, 1979

The Church of the Advent, built in 1872, is a historic Carpenter Gothic Episcopal church at 412 Oak Street, in Farmington, Minnesota, in the United States. On December 31, 1979, it was added to the National Register of Historic Places.

The church reported 25 members in 2023.

The 1872 church building seats 70 people and is used as a wedding chapel, while larger worship services are held in a structure built in 1976.

== See also ==
List of Registered Historic Places in Minnesota
