= Yukiko Kai =

Japanese manga artist (1954–1980)

Yukiko Kai 花郁 悠紀子
- Born: Kimiko Kaihatsu (開発 公子); 21 September 1954; Kanazawa, Ishikawa Prefecture, Japan
- Died: 12 December 1980 (aged 26); Kanazawa, Ishikawa Prefecture, Japan
- Known for: Manga

Yukiko Kai (花郁 悠紀子, Kai Yukiko, 21 September 1954 - 12 December 1980) was a Japanese shōjo manga artist. Her real name was Kimiko Kaihatsu (開発 公子, Kaihatsu Kimiko). She is considered a member of the Post Year 24 Group. Although she died young, her works are still analyzed. Manga artist Akiko Hatsu is her younger sister.

== Biography ==
Born in Kanazawa, Ishikawa prefecture, Kai graduated from a high school and entered a company where she worked for one year. She joined the manga coterie magazine Ravuri which her friend Yasuko Sakata operated when she was in high school. In 1973, she went to Tokyo and became a manga assistant of Moto Hagio, and lived in Hagio's house. She also worked as an assistant of Keiko Takemiya.

Kai debuted in the Spring issue of Bessatsu Viva Princess (the first issue of this magazine) in Akita Shoten for her work Anasutashia no Sutekina Otonari (Nice Next-door Neighbor of Anastasia). She published the stories of the "Shiki series" (Seasons series) and the "Anastasia series" in the magazine Gekkan Princess and Bonita.

In 1979, when Moto Hagio, Aiko Itō, Yukiko Kai, Akiko Jō and Shio Satō visited the Europe, they participated in the 37th Worldcon, Seacon '79 at Brighton, United Kingdom.

After published Ryokuin Kōro in the Summer issue of Bessatsu Viva Princess in 1980, Kai spent time under medical treatment at a hospital in Kanazawa city. She died on 12 December 1980 of stomach cancer at a hospital in Kanazawa.

The story which was contributed to the collaboration manga Kyōdai Jingi is her last work.

== Style of works ==
Kai read Japanese fantastic novels and works such as those by Tatsuhiko Shibusawa, Hideo Nakai (JA) and Kunio Tsukamoto (JA) etc. She was largely affected by these fantastic works. Kai wrote various genres of manga stories. But she loved Fantasy and Science fiction. Many of her works are classified in these genres.

== Works ==
=== Princess comics ===
There are nine books of Yukiko Kai published in Princess comics by Akita Shoten.

Title (English)	Title (Japanese)	Title	Release	ISBN	ref	Remark
Fenera	フェネラ	Fenera	1977-1130	ISBN 4-253-07091-4	ref	
Anastasia and Neighbors	アナスタシアとおとなり	Anasutashia to Otonari	1979-0310	ISBN 4-253-07138-4	ref	
Seasons Records	四季つづり	Shiki Tsuduri	1979-0805	ISBN 4-253-07143-0	ref	
Raising Dream Lily	夢ゆり育て	Yumeyuri Sodate	1980-0710	ISBN 4-253-07171-6	ref	
Visionary Flower Love	幻の花恋	Maboroshi no Hanakoi	1981-0515	ISBN 4-253-07177-5	ref	
The Day Karuki Comes	カルキのくる日	Karuki no Kuru Hi	1981-0905	ISBN 4-253-07191-0	ref	
Dance Please, Death god	踊って死神さん	Odotte Shinigami-san	1981-0920	ISBN 4-253-07190-2	ref	
Lament in the Wind	風に哭く	Kaze ni Naku	1981-1205	ISBN 4-253-07193-7	ref	
Magnolia Excerpts	白木蓮抄	Magnolia Shō	1981-1205	ISBN 4-253-07194-5	ref	

=== Akita bunko ===
There are six bunkobon books of Yukiko Kai published by Akita Shoten. In this bunkobon version, even if the title of book is same as that of Princess comics version, the stories contained are different.

Title (English)	Title (Japanese)	Title	Release	ISBN	ref	Remark
Magnolia Excerpts	白木蓮抄	Magnolia Shō	1999-0610	ISBN 4-253-17467-1	ref	
Seasons Records	四季つづり	Shiki Tsuduri	1999-1010	ISBN 4-253-17471-X	ref	
Fenera	フェネラ	Fenera	1999-1210	ISBN 4-253-17473-6	ref	
The Day Karuki Comes	カルキのくる日	Karuki no Kuru Hi	2000-0210	ISBN 4-253-17481-7	ref	
Raising Dream Lily	夢ゆり育て	Yumeyuri Sodate	2000-0610	ISBN 4-253-17562-7	ref	
Anastasia and Neighbors	アナスタシアとおとなり	Anasutashia to Otonari	2000-0810	ISBN 4-253-17564-3	ref	

=== Others ===
Title (English)	Title (Japanese)	Series	Publisher	Form	Release	ISBN	ref	Remark
Flower Evening Twilight	花宵闇	Papermoon sōsho	Shinshokan	B5	1982-0515	ISBN 4-40-301021-0	ref	
Letter of Chrysanthemum	菊花の便り	Shinchō comic	Shinchosha	A5	1992-1215	ISBN 4-10-603033-0	ref	(Alice book)
Brotherhood Duties	兄弟仁義	Papermoon comics	Shinshokan	-	1981	-	ref	Collaboration

== See also ==
- Moto Hagio - Kai was her assistant. Kai was influenced by Hagio's works.
- Yasuko Sakata - Kai's friend since high school.
- Akiko Hatsu - The younger sister of Kai. Hatsu was at one point Kai's assistant. Closely following Kai's death, Akiko Hatsu made her debut as a manga artist. The pseudonyms "Yukiko Kai" and "Akiko Hatsu" come from their real surname (Kaihatsu).
