= Fumiko Takano =

Japanese manga artist

- Born: November 12, 1957; Niigata Prefecture, Japan
- Occupation: Manga artist

Fumiko Takano (高野文子, Takano Fumiko; born 12 November 1957) is a Japanese manga artist. She is considered to be one of the manga artists of the "New Wave" of the late 1970s and early 1980s, when she started as a doujinshi (amateur) artist and then drew short stories with an unconventional style for magazines like June and Petit Flower. She was also a pioneer for female manga artists to publish outside of female-oriented publishing venues. Two of Takano's short story collections, Zettai Anzen Kamisori (1982) and Kiiroi Hon (2002), won awards. While she has a strong fan base in Japan, her work is less known internationally.

== Life ==
Takano was born in the countryside of Niigata Prefecture in 1957. When she was nine years old, she had to spend three months in a hospital due to a problem with her kidney. She did not read many manga during her childhood, as none except few by Osamu Tezuka were available, and instead she read children's literature that she borrowed from the library. During high school, she became fascinated with the works of shōjo manga artist Moto Hagio and she started drawing her own manga based on a guidebook by Shotaro Ishinomori. She submitted a short story of her own to an amateur contest of Bessatsu Shōjo Comic magazine, which Moto Hagio published her works in at the time, and received a prize. When she submitted another work to the magazine, it was rejected.

After graduating from high school, she moved to Tokyo and studied at a nursing school. She worked as a nurse for two years afterwards. During this time, she discovered COM magazine and the works of Shinji Nagashima and Fumiko Okada. She started drawing doujinshi amateur manga, she participated in the Comiket and published her first short story Hana ("Flower") in 1977 in the zine Rakugakikan. One of the members of the zine became one of the founders of the new manga magazine June, which became crucial for the development of Boys' love manga. She published her first work as a professional manga artist in 1979 in June with the short story "Zettai Anzen Kamisori". She continued publishing in June as well as anthologies around the Meikyū manga critic circle like Manga Kisōtengai. However, soon she also drew manga for commercial shōjo manga magazines like Petit Flower and Seventeen.

Her first short story collection Zettai Anzen Kamisori, named after her professional debut, was published by Hakusensha in 1982 in an unusual A5 format and with a cover design by Garo editor Minami Shinbo. The short story collection was a critical success. In the beginning of the 1980s, she was working as a secretary at the small publisher Kitansha. Her husband Kyoichiro Akiyama also worked for this publisher and edited, among others, some of Katsuhiro Otomo's short story collections. Kitansha published Takano's second short story collection Otomodachi in 1983.

In the late 1980s, she focused completely on her manga career. She drew two series, Lucky Jō-chan no Atarashii Shigoto (1986–1987) and Ruki-san (1988–1992). She also continued publishing short stories in the magazine Petit Flower until the early 1990s.

Her output slowed then in the mid-1990s, as she felt tired of producing: "I couldn’t work at the rate I used to, and I started to notice the younger generation catching up to me, and I started thinking, like, what am I supposed to do once I’m tired of this?" From 1996 until 2001, she published four short stories in the alternative manga magazines Comic Are! and Comic Cue as well as the seinen manga magazine Monthly Afternoon. These were published under Afternoon's imprint at Kodansha as the short story collection Kiiroi Hon in 2002. She did not publish any book after the release of Kiiroi Hon until Dimitri Tomkins was released first as a web comic and then as a book in 2014.

== Style ==
Most of her manga are short stories rather than series. In her early work, she experimented with several different genres, among them samurai stories, social satires and love stories.

Takano only draws manga when she feels like it. In an interview, she said she regularly has to step away from fiction, both in terms of reading and creating it. She published only relatively few works since then and is considered to be an exceptionally slow artist in the manga industry, as only seven books of hers have been published as of July 2023.

== Reception ==
Takano's work is classified as part of a "New Wave" in the manga industry in the late 1970s and early 1980s, as some of it was published outside of gendered magazine structures, like in the anthologies of the Meikyū critic circle, and her style could not be easily classified. Takano was one of the only women at the time who published manga outside of shōjo manga and josei manga. Scholar Jacqueline Berndt calls her a pioneer for women like Kyoko Okazaki, Erica Sakurazawa and Shungicu Uchida, who started publishing manga in erotic and alternative manga magazines in the 1980s.

Her work has a fan community in Japan and has been acclaimed by manga critics. Masanao Amano has called her work "experimental" and "with an interesting quality all her own, something that cannot be seen elsewhere". Manga artists Taiyō Matsumoto and Daisuke Igarashi have praised her work. She received the Japan Cartoonists Association Award in 1982 for Zettai Anzen Kamisori and the Tezuka Osamu Cultural Prize in 2003 for Kiiroi Hon. In 2015, she was the second manga artist after Osamu Tezuka to win the Iwaya Sazanami Literary Award. Her manga Dimitri Tomkins was nominated for the Manga Taishō in 2015.

While she is relatively little known in the English-speaking world, some of her manga have been translated into French and German.

== Works ==
Title	Year	Notes	Refs
"Zettai Anzen Kamisori" (絶対安全剃刀)	1979	Short story published in June	
Zettai Anzen Kamisori (絶対安全剃刀)	1982	Short story collection published by Hakusensha	
Otomodachi (おともだち)	1983	Short story collection published by Kitansha	
Lucky Jō-chan no Atarashii Shigoto (ラッキー嬢ちゃんのあたらしい仕事)	1986–1987	Serialized in Petit Flower; Published in 1 vol. by Shogakukan	
Ruki-san (るきさん)	1988–1992	Serialized in Hanako; Published in 1 vol. by Magazine House	
Bō ga Ippon (棒がいっぽん)	1995	Short story collection published by Magazine House	
Kiiroi Hon (黄色い本)	2002	Short story collection published by Kodansha	
Dimitri Tomkins (ドミトリーともきんす)	2014	Serialized online in Mato Grosso; Short story collection published by Chūōkōron Shinsha	
