= Klavs =

Danish name

- Gender: Male
- Language: Danish

Origin
- Region of origin: Denmark

Other names
- Related names: Klaus

Klavs is a predominantly Danish masculine given name; which is a variant of Klaus. People bearing the name Klavs include:

- Klāvs Čavars (born 1996), Latvian basketball player
- Klavs Jørn Christensen (born 1961), Danish sport shooter
- Klavs F. Jensen (born 1952), Danish chemical engineer
- Klavs Bruun Jørgensen (born 1974), Danish handball player and coach
- Klavs Neerbek (born 1944), Danish author, entrepreneur. chemist and interlingua promoter
- Klavs Randsborg (1913–2016), Danish archaeologist
- Klavs Rasmussen (born 1966), Danish football manager
