= Nanae Sasaya =

Japanese manga artist (1950–2024)

- ささや ななえ
- Born: January 31, 1950; Ashibetsu, Hokkaido, Japan
- Died: June 8, 2024 (aged 74)
- Occupation: Manga artist
- Writing career
- Pen name: Nanaeko Sasaya; (ささや ななえこ)

Nanae Sasaya (ささや ななえ, Sasaya Nanae; January 31, 1950 – June 8, 2024), also known by the pen name Nanaeko Sasaya (ささや ななえこ, Sasaya Nanaeko), was a Japanese manga artist. She was associated with the Year 24 Group.

== Biography ==
Sasaya was born on January 31, 1950, in Ashibetsu, Sorachi Subprefecture, Hokkaido, as the youngest in a family of four children. Despite the wishes of her father, who wanted his four children to become teachers, she chose to pursue a career as a manga artist. At the age of 20, she began working in the manga magazine Ribon, where she became known for her horror stories with occult themes. Sasaya became associated with the Year 24 Group, a number of female manga artists who emerged in the 1970s and are noted for their innovation of shōjo manga (girls' comics).

In 1990, Sasaya won the Excellence Prize at the 19th Japan Cartoonists Association Award for her manga series Okamehachimoku (おかめはちもく), an autobiographical manga about her life with her husband. In 1994, after reading Oya ni Naruhodo Muzukashii Koto wa Nai (親になるほど難しいことはない), a book about child abuse by journalist Atsuko Shiina（椎名 篤子）, she adapted the book into the manga Kōritsuita Me (凍りついた瞳; lit. Frozen Eyes). The manga, which was serialized in the manga magazine You in 1996, is credited with influencing the adoption of new child abuse laws in Japan on May 24, 2000, and it received the Avon Educational Award in 2004.

In 1996, she changed her pen name to "Nanaeko Sasaya". In 2017, she was a lecturer in the Faculty of Manga at Kyoto Seika University.

Sasaya died on June 8, 2024, at the age of 74.
