= Klaus Seltenheim =

Austrian politician (born 1984)

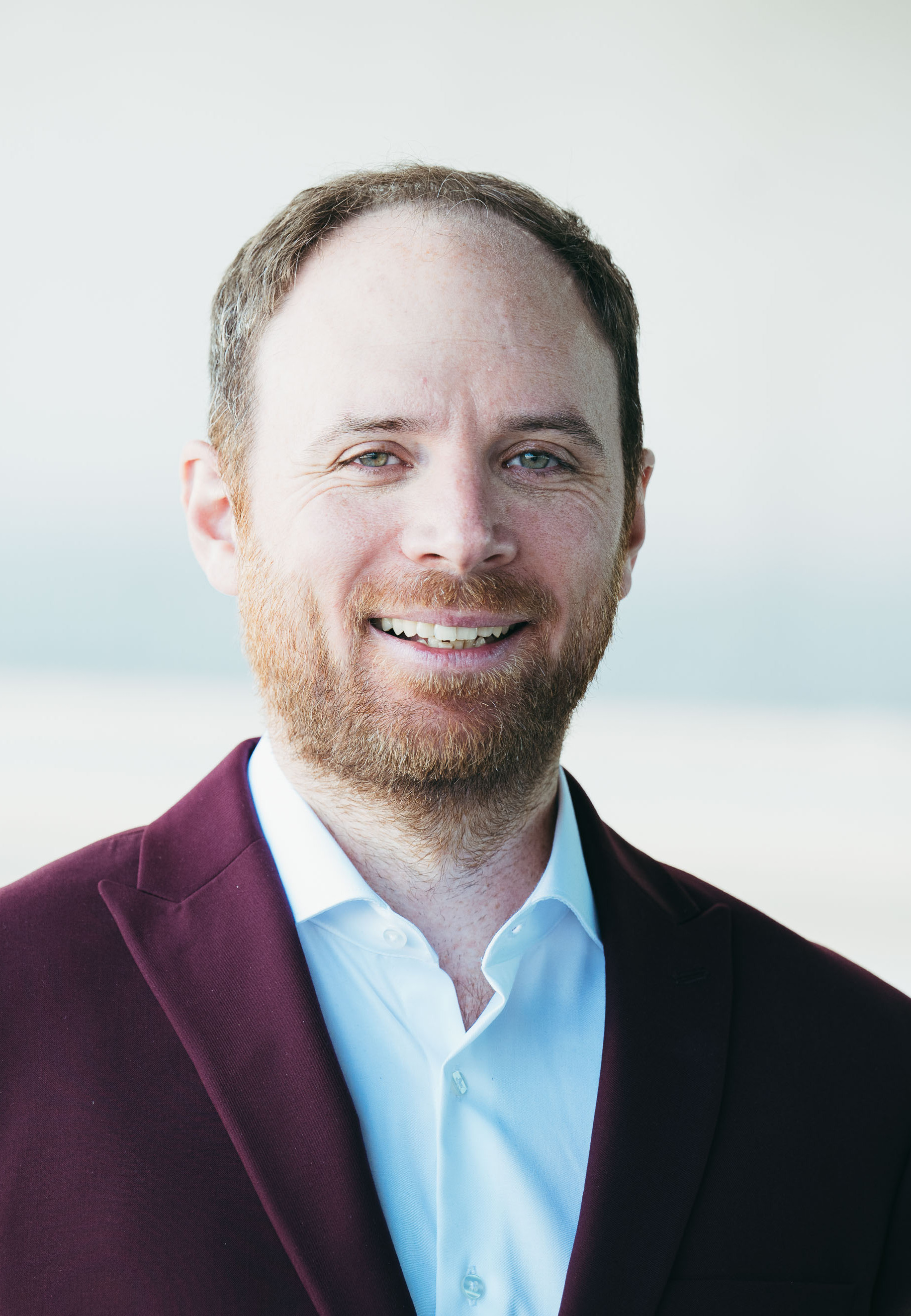
- Seltenheim in 2023

Member of the National Council
- Incumbent
- Assumed office 7 March 2025

Personal details
- Born: 20 March 1984 (age 42)
- Party: Social Democratic Party

Klaus Seltenheim (born 20 March 1984) is an Austrian politician serving as a member of the National Council since 2025. He has served as managing director of the Social Democratic Party since 2023.
