= Yoshiko Nishitani =

Japanese manga artist

- Born: 2 October 1943 (age 83) Kōchi, Kōchi Prefecture, Japan
- Area: Manga artist
- Notable works: Mary Lou

Yoshiko Nishitani (西谷祥子, Nishitani Yoshiko; born 2 October 1943) is a Japanese manga artist pioneering in shōjo manga. She released her works in Shōjo Club and Margaret. According to Rachel Thorn, Nishitani "more or less single-handedly invented the school campus romance that remains the mainstay of shôjo manga today", and Robert Petersen regards her innovation as giving her characters personality. She gave her readers characters that were like them, "teenaged Japanese girls dealing with friendships, family, school, and, yes, falling in love." Her success inspired an influx of female manga artists. Her manga Mary Lou is thought to have opened up the idea of shōjo manga telling stories about ordinary teenagers. Nishitani's characteristics have been described as 'big eyes and huge reflections within' as well as a use of curly hair and frilly clothes, with an attention to detail when drawing that inspired later artists like Nanae Sasaya.

== Works ==
- Haruko no Mita Yume (春子のみた夢) (1964, Bessatsu Margaret)
- Mary Lou (マリィ・ルウ) (1965, Margaret)
- Lemon and Cherry (レモンとサクランボ, Lemon to Sakuranbo) (1966, Margaret)
- Jessica no Sekai (ジェシカの世界) (1967, Margaret)
- Gyangu to Ojō-san (ギャングとお嬢さん) (1967, Margaret)
- Gakuseitachi no Michi (学生たちの道) (1967, Margaret)
- Hanabira Nikki (花びら日記) (1968, Margaret)
- Nanako no Seishun (奈々子の青春) (1969, Margaret)
- Konnichiwa Suzanne (こんにちはスザンヌ) (1971, Margaret)
- Shirobara Monogatari (白ばら物語) (1971, Margaret)
- Mugibae no Kikoeru Machi (麦笛の聞こえる町) (1972, Seventeen)
- Shōjo no Koi (少女の恋) (1974, Margaret)
- Sumire Sake Sake (すみれ咲け咲け) (1975, Shōjo Comic)
- Tōki-bi Hatake de (とうきび畑で) (1976, LaLa)
- Ki ga Chigai Sō no Jūnin-tachi (気がちがい荘の住人達) (1977, Hana to Yume)
- Kōfuku Yuki Kashira? (幸福ゆきかしら?) (1977, Margaret)
- Tegami wo Kudasai! (手紙をください!) (1978, Margaret)
- Ai ga Arimasu ka? (愛がありますか?) (1980, Margaret)
- Kōenji Atari (高円寺あたり) (1980, Bouquet)
- Hey Bōya (HEY☆坊や) (1981, Margaret)
