= Walter K. Klaus =

American politician

Walter Kloepping Klaus (April 19, 1912 – November 11, 2012) was an American politician and farmer.

Klaus was born in Empire Township, Dakota County, Minnesota. He graduated from Farmington High School in Farmington, Minnesota, and from Hamline University. Klaus also studied at University of Minnesota. He was a farmer and lived in Farmington. Klaus served in the Minnesota House of Representatives from 1957 to 1974 and was a Republican. He died in Farmington.
