= From Eroica with Love =

Japanese manga series by Yasuko Aoike

- Cover of the 34th volume

エロイカより愛をこめて (Eroica Yori Ai o Komete)
- Genre: Adventure; Boys' love
- Manga
- Written by: Yasuko Aoike
- Published by: Akita Shoten
- English publisher: NA: CMX Manga
- Magazine: Viva Princess (1976–1979); Princess (1979–2008); Princess Gold (2008–2012)
- Original run: December 1976 – June 2012
- Volumes: 39

From Eroica with Love (Japanese: エロイカより愛をこめて, Hepburn: Eroica Yori Ai o Komete) is a Japanese manga series written and illustrated by Yasuko Aoike. It was serialized in Viva Princess from 1976 to 1979, Princess from 1979 to 2008, and Princess Gold beginning in 2008; it has been on hiatus since 2012. Its individual chapters have been collected into 39 volumes by Akita Shoten. It has received several spin-off works, alongside a tribute manga and a stage play adaptation.

== Plot ==
The series revolves around the adventures of Dorian Red Gloria, Earl of Gloria, an openly gay English lord who is an art thief known as "Eroica", and Major Klaus Heinz von dem Eberbach, an uptight West German NATO major. They have frequent inadvertent encounters, with Dorian often disrupting Klaus's missions. Dorian has developed a fondness for and flirts incessantly with Klaus, who typically reacts with extreme disgust.

== Media ==
=== Manga ===
Written and illustrated by Yasuko Aoike, the series began serialization in Akita Shoten's Viva Princess magazine in December 1976, where the series was serialized until April 1979. In September 1979, the resumed serialization in Princess. On December 28, 2008, the series was transferred to Princess Gold. The series has been on hiatus since June 2012. Its individual chapters were collected into 39 tankōbon volumes from September 8, 1978, to August 16, 2012. The series was one of the first three titles published by CMX in English. They published the first fifteen volumes.

Aoike has written several spin-off stories, including Z: Tsetto and Madan no Shashu. A tribute series, titled With Love to From Eroica with Love!!, began serialization in Akita Shoten's Mystery Bonita magazine in June 2021 and was published in tankōbon form on February 16, 2024. Each chapter was written by a different artist, with Moto Hagio and Naoki Urasawa participating.

=== Stage play ===
A stage play adaptation was performed in the Sakura Hall in Tokyo from May 11–14, 2023. It was directed by Akiko Kodama, with Oropa Irie writing the scripts, Mako Kuwabara composing the music, and Umebou in charge of choreography. It starred Yuki Nakayama and Mitsu Murata in the lead roles. A second performance run was held in the Kinokuniya Hall in Tokyo from July 26–29, 2024.

== Reception ==
In the mid-1980s, fan translations of From Eroica with Love began to circulate through the slash fiction community, creating a "tenuous link" between slash and shōnen-ai. From Eroica with Love is more popular with slash fans than it has been with doujinshi artists. The series has been described as an example of a movement in shōnen-ai and yaoi to depict more masculine men, as part of the audience's increasing comfort with objectifying males.

Johanna Carlson of Comics Worth Reading liked the artwork, but found the story to be uninteresting. She described it as a "shōnen-ai starter book". Jason Thompson described the story as Fake and Yellow but with added spy action.
