= Akiko Hatsu =

Japanese manga artist (born 1959)

Akiko Hatsu 波津彬子
- Born: December 16, 1959 (age 66); Kanazawa, Ishikawa Prefecture, Japan
- Known for: Manga
- Movement: Yaoi

Akiko Hatsu (波津 彬子, Hatsu Akiko) is a Japanese manga artist born on December 16, 1959, in Kanazawa, Ishikawa Prefecture, Japan.

== Career ==
From the time she was in high school, she assisted her older sister, professional manga artist Yukiko Kai. After graduating high school, she began working for a printing company in Kanazawa City, but she soon quit in order to become a full-time assistant to her sister. She also began to assist other professional artists, most notably Moto Hagio.

Throughout this period, Hatsu was creating self-published manga with her friend Yasuko Sakata (who also went on to become a prominent professional manga artist), and sometime around 1980, the two of them coined the term yaoi. In 1980, Yukiko Kai died of stomach cancer at the age of 26. The following year, Hatsu made her professional debut in the magazine ALLAN with the short story "Elegy of the Waves" (波の挽歌, Nami no Banka).

Her work has been published in numerous magazines, including DUO (published by Asahi Sonorama), Grapefruit (グレープフルーツ, Gurēpufurūtsu) (published by Shinshokan), Petit Flower (published by Shogakukan, later retitled flowers), Strange Stories for Sleepless Nights (眠れぬ夜の奇妙な話, Nemureru Yo no Kimyō na Hanashi) (published by the Asahi Shimbun Corporation, later retitled Nemuki (ネムキ)). Hatsu served as an adjunct instructor at Kyoto Seika University until retiring in 2005 due to health issues.

== Works ==
B Class Paradise! (B級パラダイス!, Bīkyū Paradaisu!)
(April 1984)
Garden of Light, The Wind's Rising Shadow (光の庭·風の立つ影, Hikari no Niwa, Kaze no Tatsu Kagei)
(July 1987)
Perfect Gentlemen (パーフェクト·ジェントルマン, Pāfekuto Jentoruman)
(November 1988, bunko edition released June 2000)
Lively Golden Waves (さざめく黄金(きん) の波, Sazameku Kin no Nami)
(July 1989)
Night Tales of Enjakuan (燕雀庵夜咄, Enjakuan yo banashi)
(September 1989, bunko edition December 1999)
A Pleasure to Meet You (お目にかかれて, Ome ni Kakarete)
(April 1990, bunko edition June 2000)
Uryūdō Dream Tales (雨柳堂夢咄, Uryūdō Yume Banashi)
(Published in Strange Stories for Sleepless Nights (眠れぬ夜の奇妙な話, Nemurenu yo no Kimyō na Hanashi) [later changed to Nemuki (ネムキ)] from 1991 until 2007.) A series of short occult mystery stories set in Meiji Period Japan and featuring Ren, a young man who works in an antique shop named Uryūdō and who can see and communicate with the spirits that inhabit antiques. Currently available in wide-ban and bunko editions from Asahi Shimbun. Was a Jury Recommended work in the 2008 Japan Media Arts Festival.
Devil in the Water (水に棲む鬼, Mizu ni Sumu Oni)
(July 1992, Asahi Sonorama, bunko edition September 2000, new edition October 2007); published in English in 2000 by ComicsOne.
Mourning of Autumn Rain (秋霖の忌, Shūrin no Ki)
(November 1992, Asahi Sonorama; bunko edition 2001 (Hakusensha), new edition October 2007. A collection of short love stories; the title story is about a young man involved with his brother's widow. Published in English by ComicsOne.
Night Comes and Talks of Love (夜は来て愛を語り, Yoru wa Kite Ai o Katari)
(November 1993, bunko edition June 2003, new edition October 2007)
Master of the Haunted Inn: Tales of the Pale I (幽霊宿の主人(あるじ) 冥境青譚抄·一, Yūreijuku no Aruji: Meikyū Seitanjō Ichi)
(June 1994)
Peony Lantern (牡丹灯篭, Botan Tōrō)
(July 1995, new edition October 2007)
Dreams and Illusions of Reflected Flowers (鏡花夢幻, Kyōka Mugen)
(November 1995, bunko edition June 2000, new edition October 2007)
Reflected Moon: Tales of the Pale II (水の中の月 冥境青譚抄·二, Mizu no Naka no Tsuki: Meikyū Seitanjō Ni)
(May 1996)
The Doors of Nine Nights (9つの夜の扉, Kokonotsu no Yoru no Tobira)
(September 1997, new edition October 2007)
The Foreign Flower Guard (異国の花守, Ikoku no Hanamori)
(September 1997)
The Foreign Flower Guard: The Flowers' Voice (異国の花守 花の聲, Ikoku no Hanamori: Hana no Koe)
(March 1999)
Beautiful England Series (うるわしの英国シリーズ, Uruwashi no Eikoku Shirīzu)
(Published in Flowers (フラワーズ, Furawāzu) from 2000 to 2007.) A series of short stories with an element of fantasy set in Victorian England and centering on Cornelius Everdeanne, a young, handsome heir to an earldom. Currently available in a wide-ban edition from Shogakukan.
