= Yasuko Aoike =

Japanese manga artist

Yasuko Aoike (青池 保子, Aoike Yasuko; born July 24, 1948, in Shimonoseki, Yamaguchi) is a female Japanese manga artist. Most of her works are shōjo manga, predominantly focused on romance, adventure and light comedy, and many of them contain elements of shōnen-ai. She is included in the Year 24 Group.

Aoike grew up as the youngest child in a large family (including five sisters and a brother) that owned a construction company, so in her childhood she was surrounded by the strong men employed by the company. Her father, an amateur artist who had studied ink wash painting under a master of the Southern School style, was a great influence on Aoike.

Aoike made her professional debut at the age of 15 in Ribon magazine's 1963 Winter Special Edition with the short story Sayonara Nanette. Her short works appeared in Shōjo Friend and other Kodansha publications through the mid-1970s. She began writing serial works primarily for Akita Shoten, starting with Miriam Blue's Lake in the January 1975 issue of Princess. Her work has also appeared in Shueisha's Monthly Seventeen Magazine in the late 1970s (most notably El Alcon and Seven Seas, Seven Skies) and Hakusensha's Lala magazine in the 1980s.

She is best known for From Eroica with Love, which has been serialized by Akita Shoten since 1976 and has produced several spinoff series. It was licensed in English by CMX, which published 15 volumes from 2004 to 2010. In 1991 Aoike was awarded the Japan Cartoonists Association Award's Excellence Award for Alcazar.

== Selected works ==
Yasuko Aoike has worked on various stand-alone manga and short stories that are included in other volumes:

- Greenhill Story (story by Keiko Nagita)
- Miriam Blue's Lake (story by Keiko Nagita)
- From Eroica with Love (エロイカより愛をこめて, Eroika yori Ai o Komete)
- Sons of Eve (イブの息子たち, Ibu no Musuko-tachi)
- Seven Seas, Seven Skies (七つの海七つの空, Nanatsu no Umo Nanatsu no Sora)
- El halcón (エル・アルコン - 鷹 -, Eru Arukon - Taka)
- Ivy Navy (IVY NAVY)
- Trafalgar (トラファルガー, Torafarugā)
- Z (Z - ツェット -, Tsetto - Tsetto -)
- Der Freischütz (魔弾の射手, Madan no Shashu)
- Alcazar (アルカサル-王城-, Arukasaru-Ōjō-)
- The Tale of a Priest and a Doctor
- The Day of Saladin (サラディンの日, Saradin no Hi)
- Richard, the Lion-Hearted
- Brother Falco (修道士ファルコ, Shūdōshi Faruko)
- The Temptation of Scarlet (緋色の誘惑, Hiiro no Yūwaku)
- The Carthaginian Fantasy
- The Melancholy of Her Majesty
- The Knight of Drachen (ドラッヘンの騎士, Dorahhen no Kishi)
- Cologne Police Odo (ケルン市警オド, Köln Shikei Odo)
- Plus Ultra (collection of pictures)
- Aoike Yasuko Official Character Guide Book
