= Yasuko Sakata =

Japanese manga artist

Yasuko Sakata 坂田 靖子
- Born: 25 February 1953 (age 73); Takatsuki, Osaka Prefecture, Japan
- Known for: Manga
- Movement: Yaoi
- Awards: Agency for Cultural Affairs Media Arts Festival Grand Prize (Manga Division, 1997)

Yasuko Sakata (坂田 靖子, Sakata Yasuko) is a Japanese manga artist. She is considered to be a successor to the Year 24 Group that is credited with renewing shōjo manga. Her works span a variety of genres and stlyes, from serious to comedy. She is known for her witty writing style, and an art style with a unique sense of simplicity and contrast. From her start writing doujinshi to leading the manga circle Lovely (ラヴリ) she has had widespread influence.

== Life ==
Sakata was born on 25 February 1953 in Takatsuki, Osaka, Japan She now lives in Kanazawa, Ishikawa Prefecture. Her interest in manga began in kindergarten, as a child she was especially moved by hoshi no tategoto (星のたてごと) by Hideko Mizuno. She founded the manga circle Lovely (ラヴリ) in her third year of middle school. At age 17 she became friends with Yukiko Kai.

In 1971, as a fan of Moto Hagio, Sakata went to visit the "Ōizumi Salon", and ended up staying there and working as an assistant. By the mid 70s, her work was becoming popular among doujinshi readers, leading to her official debut with the work Saikon Kyousou Kyoku (再婚狂騒曲), published in Hana to Yume in 1975. In the late 1970s and early 1980s, she was involved in the yaoi dōjinshi movement, having co-coined the term "yaoi" with Akiko Hatsu. One of Sakata's dōjinshi, Loveri, was amongst the very first to be described as "yaoi". Her best known works are Jikan wo Warerani, Basil Shi no Yuuga na Seikatsu (The Elegant Life of Mr Basil), about a 19th-century British aristocrat, and Yamiyo no Hon (serialized 1982–1985 in Asahi Sonorama's Duo magazine). She won the Agency for Cultural Affairs Media Arts Festival Grand Prize in the Manga Division in 1997. Most of her work is short stories - as of 2003, one catalogue listed over 40 of her stories. The type of stories she tells include traditional Japanese ghost stories, science fiction, mysteries, and Western and Chinese stories. She is marked for her talent at "casually portraying" everyday life.

== Style ==
Compared to Sakata's more recent works which are full of comedy, in her early works she was prone to writing sadder stories. She is quoted as saying "I didn't really understand why, but at first I was drawn to writing mellow, sad stories, but as I get older I find that life is quite amusing. I've really turned around". Japanese: 「最初の頃はよくわからなかったせいもありまして、しっとりした話だとか悲しい話とかにも惹かれたんですけど、だんだん年を取ってきますと、人生はけっこう楽しいなって（笑）。開き直ってきまして。」

A lot of Sakata's stories are set in England, particularly Victorian era England, such as Jikan wo Warerani, Basil Shi no Yuuga na Seikatsu (The Elegant Life of Mr Basil) but she also enjoyed writing stories based on folk Japanese horror stories (Kaidan). Despite being known for her light hearted comedy, her stories are varied, and some explore character's complex psychology. Examples of her more serious work are hokori takaki senjō (誇り高き戦場) (based of the novel The General by Alan Sillitoe), paetōn (パエトーン). momo no mura (桃の村) among others. Her work celebrates characters who despite repeated failures continue to live.

== Influences ==
The manga artist's that influenced Sakata most deeply are Osamu Tezuka, Hideko Mizuno and Moto Hagio. Her interest in fantasy developed from Mary Poppins and The Chronicles of Narnia. She is fan of films, especially musicals, and was inspired by Fred Astaire, Gene Kelly and others in That's Entertainment!, as well as films like My Fair Lady, The Sound of Music, and Mary Poppins. Her favorite directors are Alfred Hitchcock, David Lean, William Wyler and Federico Fellini.

Her interest in Asian folklore and stories has been influenced by Alakazam the Great, and NHK documentaries about works such as Tōno Monogatari (遠野物語) by Kunio Yanagita. Rakugo and Kyōgen are influences on her comedy.

== Works ==
=== 1970s ===
- erudon no yoru (エルドンの夜)
- yoru no ochakai (夜のお茶会)
- oyasumi mae no hon (おやすみまえの本)
- ao kinu no kaze (青絹の風)
- D-han repōto (D班レポート)
- obake chitai (おばけ地帯)
- chan no kishi tachi (チャンの騎士たち)

=== 1980s ===
- バジル氏の優雅な生活 Basil Shi no Yuuga na Seikatsu (The Elegant Life of Mr Basil)
- hyūi ・dyūi monogatari (ヒューイ・デューイ物語)
- raira ・ penshon (ライラ・ペンション)
- amon to asuraēru (アモンとアスラエール)
- kyōdaijingi (兄弟仁義)
- mahōken (魔法圏)
- yamiyo no hon (闇夜の本)
- hoshigui (星食い)
- furedorikku・buraun wa nido shinu (フレドリック・ブラウンは二度死ぬ)
- raimu hakase no jūnikagetsu (ライム博士の12か月)
- murano (村野)
- erefantoman ・ raifu (エレファントマン・ライフ)
- tantei gēmu (探偵ゲーム)
- paetōn (パエトーン)
- hokori takaki senjō (誇り高き戦場)
- zōazarashi kai ni (ゾウアザラシかいに)
- pītā to pisutāchi (ピーターとピスターチ)
- māgaretto to goshujin no sokonuke chindōchū (マーガレットとご主人の底抜け珍道中)
- nōberu ・ manshon (ノーベル・マンション)
- tsuki to hakase (月と博士)
- tenkafun (天花粉)
- hanamoyō no meiro (花模様の迷路)
- megami no mita yume (女神の見た夢)
- yami tsuki ō (闇月王)
- kichijō haruto rakushumī (吉祥花人ラクシュミー)
- kayan to kushi (カヤンとクシ)
- mairuzu kyō monogatari (マイルズ卿ものがたり)
- ojisama wa shi no meiwaku (叔父様は死の迷惑)
- tō ni furu yuki (塔にふる雪)
- baraeti・gifuto (バラエティ・ギフト)
- chū kun to hai chan (チューくんとハイちゃん)
- shimauma (シマウマ)
- sakatayasuko no hon (坂田靖子の本)
- zō no katakake (ゾウの肩かけ)
- sakatayasuko kessaku shū (坂田靖子傑作集)
- hikkoshiteiku anatahe (引っ越していくあなたへ)

=== 1990s ===
- danjonzu & doragonzu (ダンジョンズ&ドラゴンズ)
- bīsuto teiru (ビーストテイル)
- ōgon no nashi (黄金の梨)
- mizu no mori ayaginu tan (水の森綺譚)
- chinmiibun (珍見異聞)
- arisu・bukku (アリス・ブック)
- mizuno henrin makuguran garō (水の片鱗 マクグラン画廊)
- bigin・za・bigin (ビギン・ザ・ビギン)
- shōto fushigi sutōrīzu (ショート不思議ストーリーズ)
- shoki kessaku shū (初期傑作集)
- kimuchi (キムチ)
- pasuta yarō (パスタ野郎)
- kusare en (くされ縁)
- hanjuku shōnen (半熟少年)
- danjon kyōsōkyoku (ダンジョン狂騒曲)
- jisen sakuhinshū (自選作品集)
- THE X FILES 2 umi no kanata ni (THE X FILES 2 海の彼方に)
- tekateka airando (てかてかアイランド)
- yo naki udon (よなきうどん)
- midorigaokasanchōme (緑が丘3丁目)
- basu kabi ru no mamono (バスカビルの魔物)
- tsutsumichūnagom monogatari (堤中納言物語)

=== 2000s ===
- tainī pomupomu (タイニーポムポム)
- isoppu hentōsen (イソップ扁桃腺)
- chin ken dyukasu no misuterī (珍犬デュカスのミステリー)
- sakata sō 221gō shitsu (サカタ荘221号室)
- deru・kanto・bajetto (デル・カント・バジェット)
- umi ni ika nai ka (海に行かないか)
- taputapu dai ari (たぷたぷだいあり)
- kurisumasu・kyaroru (クリスマス・キャロル)

=== 2010s ===
- beru deaborika (ベル デアボリカ)
- sakatayasuko yorinuki sakuhinshū (坂田靖子よりぬき作品集)
- henjin tantei emu (変人探偵エム)
- tsubikkī korekushon (ツビッキーコレクション)
- sakatayasuko no kurisumasu☆mania (坂田靖子のクリスマス☆マニア)
- ichiō tantei kyoku (一応探偵局)
