= Kaze to Ki no Uta =

Japanese manga series by Keiko Takemiya

- The cover of the first tankōbon volume, featuring Gilbert (left) and Serge (right)

風と木の詩
- Genre: Shōnen-ai
- Manga
- Written by: Keiko Takemiya
- Published by: Shogakukan
- Magazine: Weekly Shōjo Comic; (February 29, 1976 – November 5, 1980); Petit Flower; (February 1981 – June 1984)
- Original run: February 29, 1976 – June 1984
- Volumes: 17
- Original video animation

Kaze to Ki no Uta Sanctus: Sei Naru Kana
- Directed by: Yoshikazu Yasuhiko
- Music by: Nobuyuki Nakamura
- Released: November 6, 1987
- Runtime: 60 minutes
- Sequels and related works
- Sunroom Nite (1970); Kami no Kohitsuji: Agnus Dei (1990–1994); Kōfuku no Hato (1991)

Kaze to Ki no Uta (風と木の詩, lit. "The Poem of Wind and Trees" or "The Song of Wind and Trees") is a Japanese manga series written and illustrated by Keiko Takemiya. It was serialized in Shogakukan's shōjo manga magazines Weekly Shōjo Comic and then Petit Flower from February 1976 to June 1984. One of the earliest works of shōnen-ai (a genre of male-male romance fiction aimed at a female audience), Kaze to Ki no Uta follows the tragic romance between Gilbert Cocteau and Serge Battour, two students at an all-boys boarding school in late 19th-century France.

The series was developed and published amid a significant transitional period for shōjo manga (manga for girls), as the medium shifted from an audience composed primarily of children to an audience of adolescents and young adults. This shift was characterized by the emergence of narratively more complex stories focused on politics, psychology, and sexuality, and came to be embodied by a new generation of shōjo manga artists collectively referred to as the Year 24 Group, of which Takemiya was a member. The mature subject material of Kaze to Ki no Uta and its focus on themes of sadomasochism, incest, and rape were controversial for shōjo manga of the 1970s; it took nearly seven years from Takemiya's initial conceptualization of the story for her editors at Shogakukan to agree to publish it.

Upon its eventual release, Kaze to Ki no Uta achieved significant critical and commercial success, with Takemiya winning the 1979 Shogakukan Manga Award in both the shōjo and shōnen (manga for boys) categories for Kaze to Ki no Uta and Toward the Terra, respectively. It is regarded as a pioneering work of shōnen-ai, and is credited by critics with widely popularizing the genre. An anime film adaptation of the series, Kaze to Ki no Uta Sanctus: Sei Naru Kana (風と木の詩 SANCTUS－聖なるかな－, lit. "The Poem of Wind and Trees Sanctus: Is It Holy?"), was released as an original video animation (home video) in 1987.

== Synopsis ==
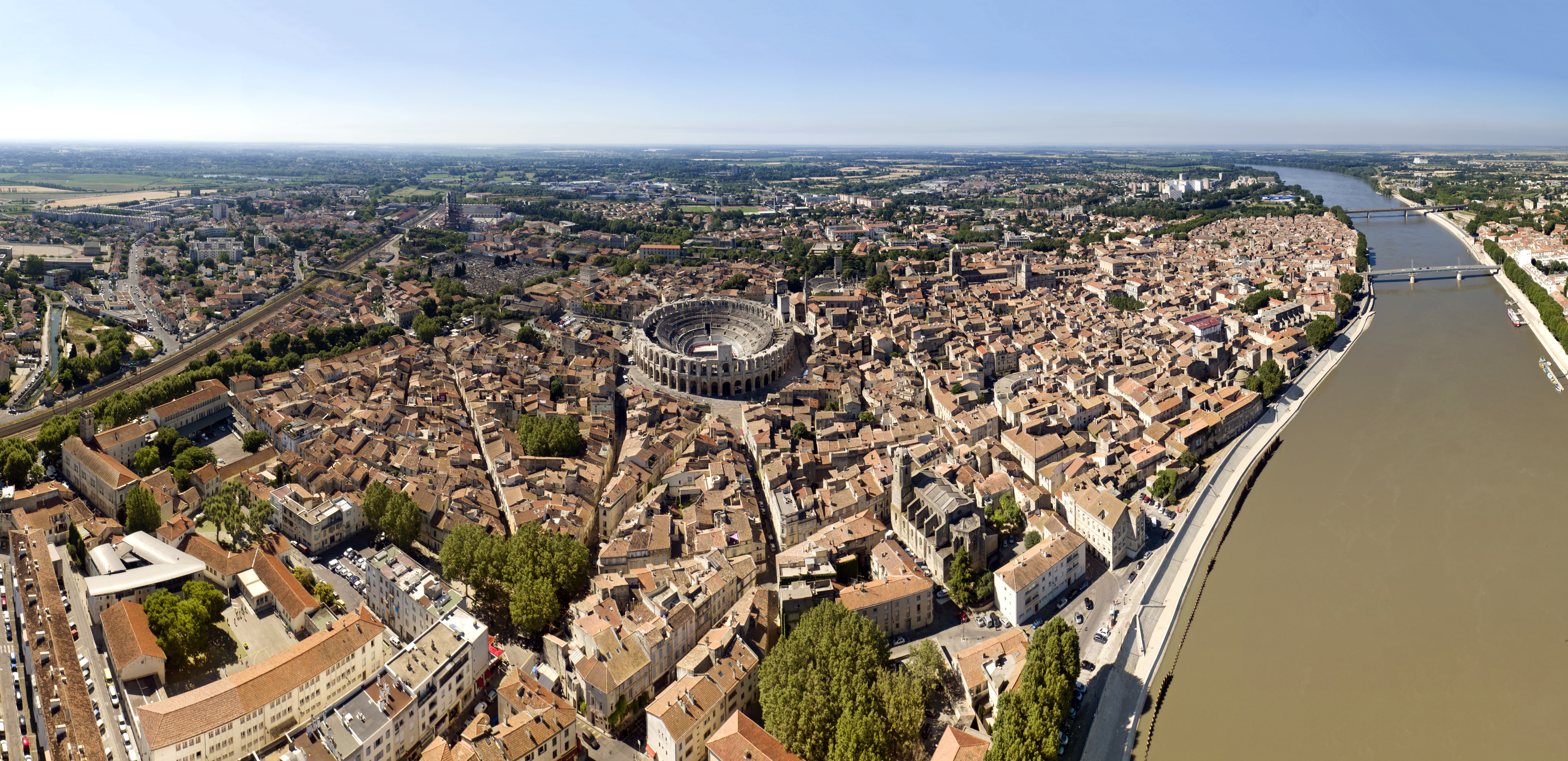
The city of Arles in France, where the series is set

Kaze to Ki no Uta is set in late 19th-century France, primarily at the fictional Lacombrade Academy, an all-boys boarding school located on the outskirts of the city of Arles in Provence.

Serge Battour, the teenaged son of a French viscount and a Roma woman, is sent to Lacombrade at the request of his late father. He is roomed with Gilbert Cocteau, a misanthropic student who is ostracized by the school's pupils and professors for his truancy, and for having sexual relations with students and faculty. Serge's efforts to befriend his roommate and Gilbert's simultaneous efforts both to drive away and to seduce Serge form a complicated and disruptive relationship between the pair.

Gilbert's apparent cruelty and promiscuity are the result of a lifetime of neglect and abuse, as perpetrated chiefly by his ostensible uncle Auguste Beau. Auguste is a respected figure in French high society who has physically, emotionally, and sexually abused Gilbert since he was a child. His manipulation of Gilbert is so significant that Gilbert believes that the two are in love, and he remains beguiled by Auguste even after he later learns that he is not his uncle, but his biological father.

Despite threats of ostracism and violence, Serge perseveres in his attempts to bond with Gilbert, becoming friends and eventually lovers. Faced with rejection by Lacombrade's faculty and students, Gilbert and Serge flee to Paris. Serge finds work to support the pair, causing him to unintentionally alienate Gilbert, who is now desperate for his affection. Gilbert is later attacked and forcibly drugged by a group of men, and descends into a life of drug use and forced prostitution. While hallucinating under the influence of opium, Gilbert runs in front of a moving carriage and is fatally crushed under its wheels, convinced that he has seen Auguste. Some of the pair's friends, who have recently rediscovered the couple, console the traumatized Serge and return him to his parents' home.

== Characters ==
The transliteration of the characters' names is sourced from the Italian edition of the manga, which the author approved. Voice actors in Kaze to Ki no Uta Sanctus: Sei Naru Kana are noted where applicable.

=== Primary characters ===
Gilbert Cocteau (ジルベール・コクトー, Jirubēru Kokutō)
Voiced by: Yūko Sasaki
A fourteen-year-old student at Lacombrade from an aristocratic family in Marseille. He is the illegitimate child of his mother Anne Marie and her brother-in-law Auguste Beau, the latter of whom has abused Gilbert physically, emotionally, and sexually since he was a child. This abuse has left Gilbert as an antisocial cynic, unable to express love or affection except through sex. Gilbert is initially antagonistic and violent towards his new roommate Serge, and rejects his early attempts to befriend him. Serge's persistent altruism slowly wins Gilbert over, and the two flee to Paris as lovers. Gilbert has difficulty adjusting to their new lives of genteel poverty and begins using drugs and engaging in prostitution, and dies after being struck by a carriage while under the influence of opium.
Serge Battour (セルジュ・バトゥール, Seruju Batūru)
Voiced by: Noriko Ohara
A fourteen-year-old student at Lacombrade, and heir to an aristocratic house. The orphaned son of a French viscount and a Roma woman who faces discrimination for his mixed ethnicity, Serge is a musical prodigy with a noble and humanistic sense of morality. Despite Gilbert's initial ill treatment of him, he remains devoted in his attempts to help and understand him. His attraction to Gilbert causes him confusion and distress, particularly when he finds that he can depend on neither the church nor his friends for guidance and support. He gradually grows closer to Gilbert as they become friends and later lovers, and the two flee Lacombrade together.

=== Secondary characters ===
Auguste Beau (オーギュスト・ボウ, Ōgyusuto Bō)
Voiced by: Kaneto Shiozawa
Gilbert's legal uncle, later revealed to be his biological father. Adopted into the house of Cocteau as a child, Auguste was raped by his elder step-brother in his own youth and has abused Gilbert from a young age. At first attempting to raise Gilbert to be an "obedient pet", he later works to transform him into a "pure" and "artistic" individual through neglect and manipulation of Gilbert's obsessive love for him. Upon learning of Serge's relationship with Gilbert, he works to separate the pair.
Pascal Biquet (パスカル・ビケ, Pasukaru Bike)
Voiced by: Hiroshi Takemura
An eccentric, iconoclastic classmate of Serge and Gilbert and a close friend of the former. A super senior who is dismissive of religion and classical education, he insists upon the importance of science and takes it upon himself to teach Serge about sexuality. Though mildly attracted to Gilbert, he is the most frankly heterosexual of Serge's confidants, and helps to introduce Serge to women.
Carl Maïsser (カール・マイセ, Kāru Maise)
Voiced by: Tsutomu Kashiwakura
Serge's first friend at Lacombrade. A gentle, pious boy who struggles with his attraction to Gilbert.
Aryon Rosemarine (アリオーナ・ロスマリネ, Ariōna Rosumarine)
Voiced by: Yoshiko Sakakibara
The sadistic student superintendent at Lacombrade, nicknamed the "White Prince". A distant relative of the Cocteau family, he was raped by Auguste at the age of 15. Rosemarine cooperates with Auguste's manipulation of Gilbert, but forms a friendship with Serge and ultimately aids Gilbert and Serge in their escape to Paris.
Jules de Ferrier (ジュール・ド・フェリィ, Jūru do Feryi)
A student supervisor at Lacombrade, and Rosemarine's childhood friend. His aristocratic family's fortune was lost with the death of his father, and he is only able to attend Lacombrade through his intelligence and friendship with Rosemarine. He provides comfort and guidance to Gilbert and Rosemarine through their troubles.

== Development ==
=== Context ===
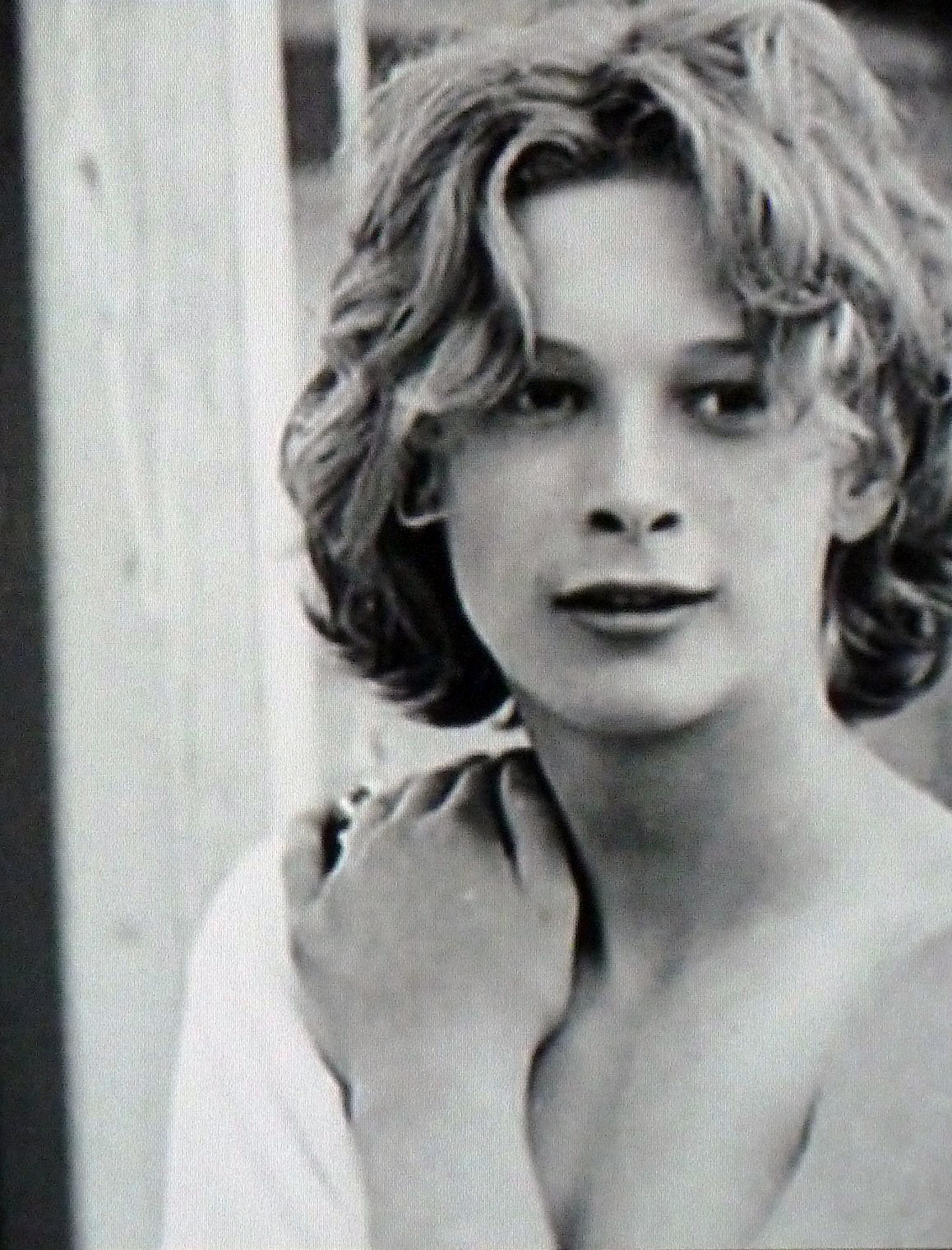
The 1971 film Death in Venice (actor Björn Andrésen pictured) was an influence on Kaze to Ki no Uta.

Keiko Takemiya made her debut as a manga artist in 1967, and though her early works attracted the attention of manga magazine editors, none achieved any particular critical or commercial success. Her debut occurred in the context of a restrictive shōjo manga (girls' manga) publishing culture: stories were marketed to an audience of children, were focused on uncomplicated subject material such as familial drama or romantic comedy, and favored Cinderella-like female protagonists defined by their passivity. Beginning in the 1970s, a new generation of shōjo artists emerged who created manga stories that were more psychologically complex, dealt directly with topics of politics and sexuality, and were aimed at an audience of teenage readers. This grouping of artists, of which Takemiya was a member, came to be collectively referred to as the Year 24 Group. (Note: The group was so named because its members were born in or around year 24 of the Shōwa era (or 1949 in the Gregorian calendar).) The group contributed significantly to the development of shōjo manga by expanding the genre to incorporate elements of science fiction, historical fiction, adventure fiction, and same-sex romance: both male–male (shōnen-ai and yaoi) and female–female (yuri).

Takemiya was a close friend to fellow Year 24 Group member Moto Hagio, with whom she shared a rented house in Ōizumigakuenchō, Nerima, Tokyo, from 1971 to 1973. The house was nicknamed the "Ōizumi Salon", and came to be an important gathering point for Year 24 Group members and their affiliates. Their friend and next-door neighbor Norie Masuyama was a significant influence on both artists: though Masuyama was not a manga artist, she was a shōjo manga enthusiast motivated by a desire to elevate the genre from its status as a frivolous distraction for children to a serious literary art form, and introduced Takemiya and Hagio to literature, magazines, and films that came to inspire their works.

Of the works Masuyama introduced to Takemiya, novels by writer Hermann Hesse in the Bildungsroman genre were particularly relevant to the development of Kaze to Ki no Uta. Masuyama introduced Takemiya and Hagio to Beneath the Wheel (1906), Demian (1919), and Narcissus and Goldmund (1932); Demian was especially impactful on both artists, directly influencing the plot and setting of both Takemiya's Kaze to Ki no Uta and Hagio's own major contribution to the shōnen-ai genre, The Heart of Thomas (1974). Though none of Hesse's stories are explicitly homoerotic, they inspired the artists through their depictions of strong bonds between male characters, their boarding school settings, and their focus on the internal psychology of their male protagonists. Other works that informed the development of Kaze to Ki no Uta were the European drama films if.... (1968), Fellini Satyricon (1969), and Death in Venice (1971), which screened in Japan in the 1970s and influenced both Takemiya and Hagio in their depiction of "preternaturally beautiful" male characters; Taruho Inagaki's essay Shōnen-ai no Bigaku (少年愛の美学; "The Aesthetics of Boy Love", 1968), which influenced Takemiya to select a school as the setting for her series; and issues of Barazoku, the first commercially circulated Japanese gay men's magazine. (Note: Hagio has reported that she was uninterested in the sexually explicit Barazoku, but that the magazine especially affected Takemiya and Masuyama.)

=== Production ===
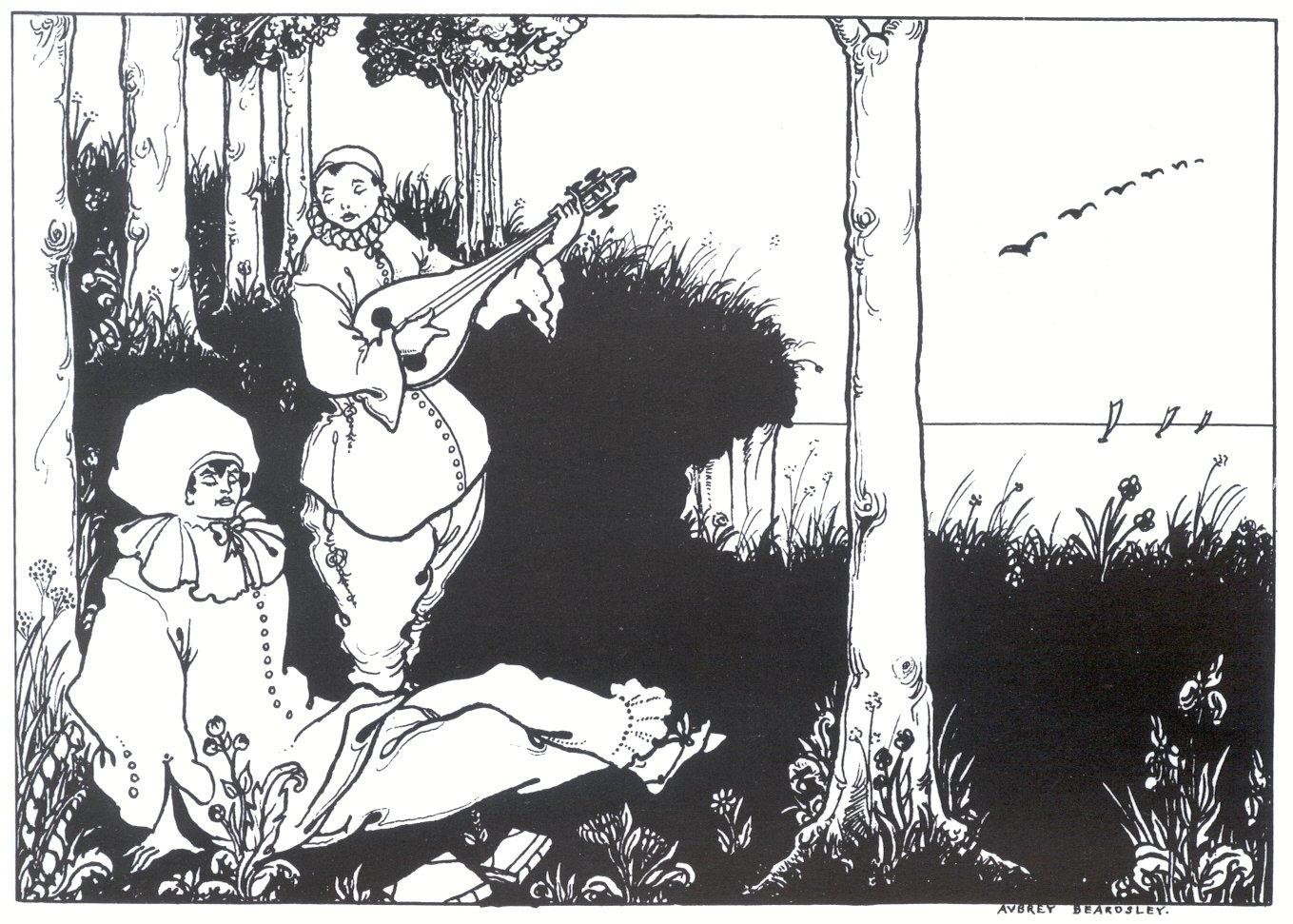

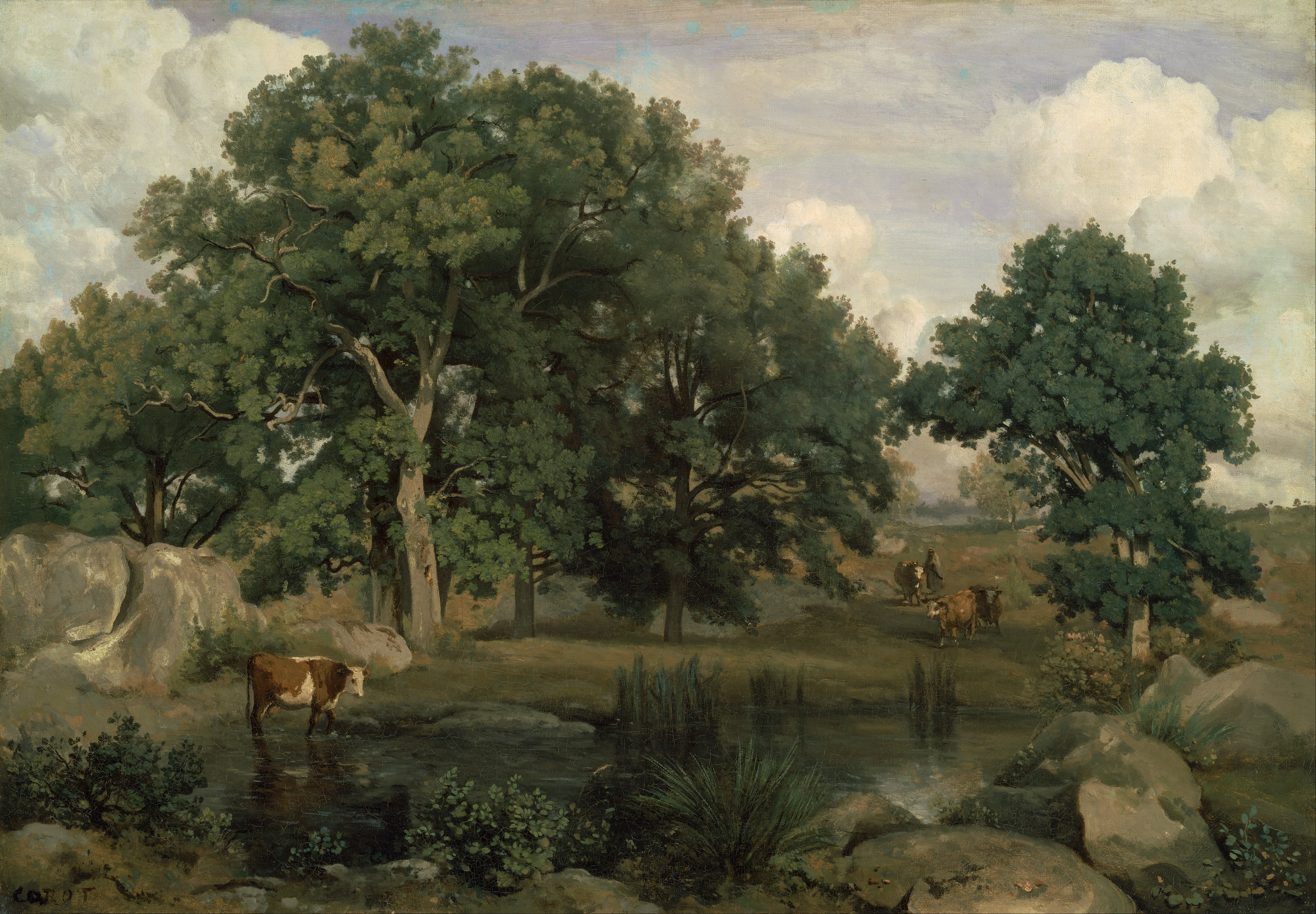
Takemiya cited the black ink drawings of Aubrey Beardsley (top) and the landscapes of the Barbizon school (bottom) as influences on the artwork of Kaze to Ki no Uta.

Takemiya initially conceived of the story of Kaze to Ki no Uta in 1970, following which she stayed up through the night with Masuyama discussing the series over the telephone. She wrote a detailed outline of the plot in December of that year, and drew the first 50 pages of the manga in a sketchbook in January 1971. Takemiya showed the sketchbook draft to multiple editors, but none were interested in publishing the series, citing its controversial subject material. Several editors advised her to move the opening scene of the series, which depicts Gilbert in bed with an older male student, to later in the story; she refused, stating, "I want to put the page that best reflects the story at the beginning."

At the time, manga censorship codes specifically forbade depictions of male–female sex, but ostensibly permitted depictions of male–male sex. Takemiya's decision to focus on male over female protagonists – still a relatively new practice in shōjo manga at the time – was born from her desire to write a sexually explicit story that she believed would appeal to female readers. Per Takemiya, "if there is a sex scene between a boy and a girl, [readers] don't like it because it seems too real. It leads to topics like getting pregnant or getting married, and that's too real. But if it's two boys, they can avoid that and concentrate on the love aspect." In developing the main characters of the series, Takemiya considered that Gilbert's complex background necessitated the creation of an equally compelling background for Serge, prompting her to place focus on Serge's deceased parents. She drew inspiration for Serge's mixed ethnic background from La Dame aux Camélias (1852), saying "if you had to tell a story about a child of a viscount, I thought, you had no other choice but La Dame aux Camélias."

In the December 1970 issue of Bessatsu Shōjo Comic, Takemiya published a one-shot (standalone single chapter) manga titled Yuki to Hoshi to Tenshi to... ("Snow and Stars and Angels and..."), which was later re-published under the title Sunroom Nite ("In the Sunroom"). Takemiya describes the one-shot as a "compact" version of Kaze to Ki no Uta: both stories focus on a Roma teenager named Serge Battour, who enters a relationship with a blond boy who dies at the conclusion of the story. Aware that a male–male romance story was likely to be heavily revised or rejected by her editor, Takemiya intentionally submitted Yuki to Hoshi to Tenshi to... immediately before the magazine's publication deadline. Her gambit was successful, and the one-shot was published without edits; Yuki to Hoshi to Tenshi to... became the first work in the genre that would become known as shōnen-ai and granted Takemiya greater critical recognition.

Takemiya contributed a "one-page theater" (a page in which an author discusses miscellaneous thoughts and impressions with essay-like illustrations) to Shogakukan's shōjo manga anthology Weekly Shōjo Comic in September 1973, in which she described her desire to write Kaze to Ki no Uta. She noted that it had been three years since she conceived of the story and characters, and that she still wished to see it published. She told readers, "Please remember the name 'Gilbert'. I'm sure I will draw it!" Along with the editorial barriers she faced, Takemiya found it difficult to develop the story as she felt she lacked sufficient knowledge of its European setting. In 1973, Takemiya traveled to Europe with Hagio, Masuyama, and Year 24 Group member Ryoko Yamagishi. (Note: None could speak French, so the group communicated with locals using drawings; Takemiya reports that "at an information desk of a hotel, I explained that we needed a room with a bathtub and shower, drawing illustrations".) She stated that the trip made her "more concerned with details. After I knew how to make a stone-paved street, I also watched repairs on it and stared at the blocks which were used." European art of the 19th century became a major influence on the art style of Kaze to Ki no Uta; Takemiya has specifically cited the black ink drawings of Aubrey Beardsley and the landscapes of the Barbizon school as influences. Takemiya continued to visit Europe annually, staying in different countries for a month each time.

In an effort to overcome the low level of editorial freedom and autonomy that was preventing her from publishing Kaze to Ki no Uta, Takemiya sought to build her profile as an artist by creating a manga series that would have mass appeal. That series, Pharaoh no Haka (ファラオの墓, "The Pharaoh's Tomb", 1974–1976), follows the kishu ryūritan ("noble wandering narrative") story formula of an exiled king who returns to lead his kingdom to greatness, which Takemiya chose specifically because it was popular in manga at the time. Shortly after Pharaoh no Haka began serialization, Takemiya published a 16-page preview of Kaze to Ki no Uta in the first collected volume of her manga series Sora ga Suki! (空がすき!, "I Love the Sky!", 1971–1972). The preview, titled Rakuyō no Ki (落葉の記; "The Chronicle of Fallen Leaves"), was included at the end of the volume without notice or explanation. Takemiya said she wanted to "expose" a part of Kaze to Ki no Uta, and she was curious to see how readers would react to it. Pharaoh no Haka was ultimately a commercial success that succeeded at boosting Takemiya's profile as an artist, especially among female readers, and granted her the necessary influence at Shogakukan to publish Kaze to Ki no Uta. In all, it took nearly seven years for Takemiya to, in her words, "earn the right" to publish the series.

=== Release ===
Kaze to Ki no Uta began serialization in Weekly Shōjo Comic on February 29, 1976. It attracted controversy for its sexual depictions, particularly its opening male–male sex scene and its depictions of sadomasochism, incest, and rape. Takemiya has stated that she was concerned how parent–teacher associations would react to the series, as Weekly Shōjo Comic publisher Shogakukan was a "stricter" company best known for publishing academic magazines for schoolchildren. Reader letters in Weekly Shōjo Comic were divided between those who were offended by the subject material of the series, and those who praised its narrative complexity and explicit representations of sex. Gilbert was initially unpopular with readers, though as the series progressed to depict his backstory and early childhood, he subsequently became more popular than Serge.

In 1980, Weekly Shōjo Comic editor Junya Yamamoto became the founding editor of Petit Flower, a new manga anthology aimed at an audience of adult women that published titles with mature subject material. Kaze to Ki no Uta moved to the new magazine, and the last chapter of the series published in Weekly Shōjo Comic was released on November 5, 1980. Serialization continued in Petit Flower beginning in the Winter 1981 issue, where it continued until the conclusion of the series in the June 1984 issue.

Shogakukan collected the series, which was significantly longer than Takemiya's previous works, into 17 tankōbon volumes by Shogakukan from May 1977 to August 1984. The publisher re-released it as nine hardcover volumes from July 1988 to March 1989. Since then, Kaze to Ki no Uta has been reprinted several times by different Japanese publishers, including a nine-volume edition published as part of "The Complete Keiko Takemiya" collection under Kadokawa Shoten's Asuka Comics DX imprint from August 1990 to March 1991; a four-volume aizōban edition published under Chuokoron-Shinsha's Chuko Aizōban imprint from August to November 1993; a ten-volume bunkoban edition published under Hakusensha's Bunko imprint from March to September 1995; and an eight-volume bunkoban edition published under Chuokoron-Shinsha's Chuko Bunko Comic-ban imprint from July 2002 to January 2003. The series was also released as sixteen e-book volumes by eBook Initiative Japan in 2010.

Kaze to Ki no Uta was translated and published outside of Japan for the first time in 2018, by Spanish-language publisher Milky Way Ediciones. It was released in ten omnibus volumes based on the 1995 Japanese bunkoban edition, featuring color pages and new cover art chosen by Takemiya. The series was also published by Italian-language publisher Edizioni BD in late 2018, under their J-Pop Manga imprint. It was initially released in a ten-volume box set, the individual volumes later being released once a month.

== Themes and analysis ==
=== Gender ===
The primary characters of Kaze to Ki no Uta are bishōnen (lit. "beautiful boys"), a term for androgynous male characters that sociologist Chizuko Ueno describes as representing "the idealized self-image of girls". Takemiya has stated that her use of protagonists that blur gender distinctions was done intentionally, "to mentally liberate girls from the sexual restrictions imposed on us [as women]". By portraying male characters with physical traits 'typical' of female characters in manga – such as slender bodies, long hair, and large eyes – the presumed female reader is invited to self-identify with the male protagonist. This device led psychologist Hayao Kawai to remark in his analysis of Kaze to Ki no Uta that "perhaps no other work has expressed the inner world of the adolescent girl to such an extent".

This self-identification among girls and women assumes many forms; art critic Midori Matsui considers how this representation appeals to adolescent female readers by harking back to a sexually undifferentiated state of childhood, while also allowing them to vicariously contemplate the sexual attractiveness of boys. James Welker notes in his field work that members of Japan's lesbian community reported being influenced by manga featuring characters who blur gender distinctions, specifically citing Kaze to Ki no Uta and The Rose of Versailles by Year 24 Group member Riyoko Ikeda. This self-identification is expressed in negative terms by psychologist Watanabe Tsueno who sees shōjo manga as a "narcissistic space" in which bishōnen operate simultaneously as "the perfect object of [the readers'] desire to love and their desire for identification", seeing Kaze to Ki no Uta as the "apex" of this tendency.

Manga scholar Yukari Fujimoto argues that female interest in shōnen-ai is "rooted in hatred of women", which she argues recurs throughout the genre in the form of misogynistic thoughts and statements expressed by male characters. She cites as evidence Gilbert's overt disgust towards women, arguing that his misogynistic statements serve to draw the reader's attention to the subordinate position women occupy in society; as the female reader is ostensibly meant to self-identify with Gilbert, these statements expose "the mechanisms by which women cannot help falling into a state of self-hatred". To Fujimoto, this willingness to "[turn] around" these misogynistic statements against the reader, thus forcing them to examine their own internalized sexism, represents "one of the keys" to understanding the influence and legacy of Kaze to Ki no Uta and works like it.

=== Sex and sexual violence ===
I wanted to tell women what sex was without veiling it, including bad things as well as good things. Drawing sex as an important theme in relation to propriety seems naturally acceptable. But sex involves an issue of power. From the old days, during war, men used to rape women of an enemy country. In order to understand such circumstances surrounding women, in these peaceful days, women should think directly about sex without fear, not just about sex with fear. I thought that the most important issue for women was sex. So, I tried to imagine how I could convey the message directly to women.

— Keiko Takemiya

Shōnen-ai allowed shōjo manga artists to depict sex, which had long been considered taboo in the medium. There has been significant academic focus on the motivations of Japanese women who read and created shōnen-ai in the 1970s, with manga scholar Deborah Shamoon considering how shōnen-ai permitted the exploration of sex and eroticism in a way that was "distanced from the girl readers' own bodies", as male–male sex is removed from female concerns of marriage and pregnancy. Yukari Fujimoto notes how sex scenes in Kaze to Ki no Uta are rendered with a "boldness" that was unprecedented in shōjo manga at the time, depicting "sexual desire as overwhelming power". She examines how the abuse suffered by Gilbert has rendered him as "a creature who cannot exist without sexual love" and who thus suffers "the pain of passivity". By applying passivity, a trait that is stereotypically associated with women, to male characters, she argues that Takemiya is able to depict sexual violence "in a purified form and in a way that protects the reader from its raw pain". These scenes of sexual violence "would be all too realistic if a woman were portrayed as the victim"; by portraying the subject as a man, "women are freed from the position of always being the one 'done to', and are able to take on the viewpoint of the 'doer', and also the viewpoint of the 'looker'."

Midori Matsui similarly argues Gilbert exists as a "pure object of the male gaze", an "effeminate and beautiful boy whose presence alone provokes the sado-machochistic desire of older males to rape, humiliate, and treat him as a sexual commodity". She argues that Gilbert represents a parody of the femme fatale, and at the same time "his sexuality evokes the subversive element of abjection." That is to say, Gilbert's backstory as a victim of rape – a status that is often associated with women – allows the female reader to identify with him, and experience an abject and vicarious fear that reflects her own fear of rape. Gilbert's contradictory status as both femme fatale and sexual assault victim therefore contradicts the stereotype of "feminine power of seduction that usurps the rationality of the masculine subject", at the same time reinforcing "conventional metaphors of feminine sexuality as a dark seducer".

Kazuko Suzuki considers that although society often shuns and looks down upon women who are raped in reality, shōnen-ai depicts male characters who are raped as still "imbued with innocence" and typically still loved by their rapists after the act. She cites Kaze to Ki no Uta as the primary work that gave rise to this trope in shōnen-ai manga, noting how the narrative suggests that individuals who are "honest to themselves" and love only one other person monogamously are regarded as "innocent". That is, so long as the protagonists of shōnen-ai "continue to pursue their supreme love within an ideal human relationship, they can forever retain their virginity at the symbolic level, despite having repeated sex in the fictional world".

=== Occidentalism ===
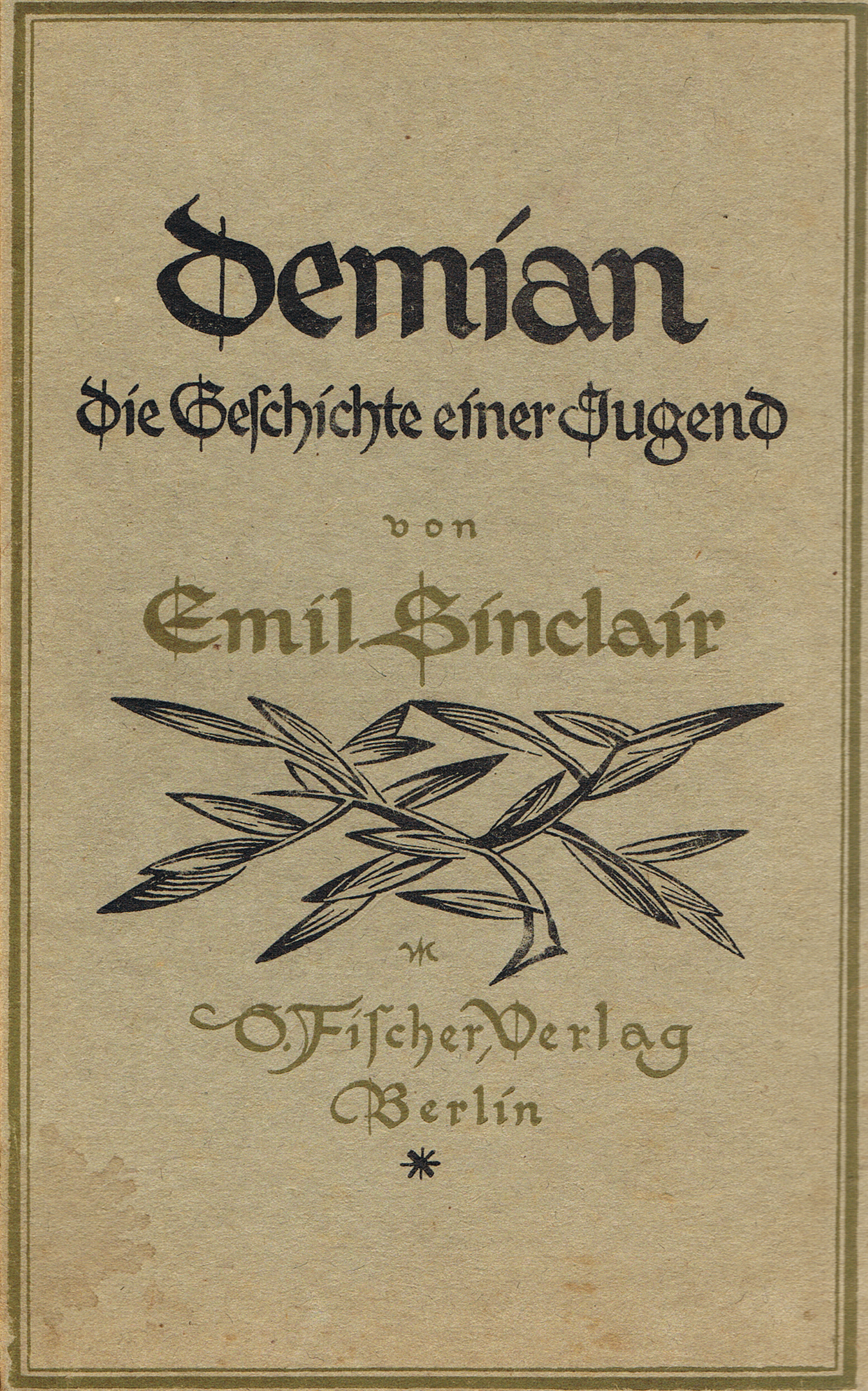
Works by the Year 24 Group often used western literary tropes, especially those associated with the Bildungsroman genre, such as Hermann Hesse's Demian.

The French setting of Kaze to Ki no Uta is reflective of Takemiya's own interest in European culture, which is in turn reflective of a generalized fascination with Europe in Japanese girls' culture of the 1970s. Takemiya has stated that interest in Europe was a "characteristic of the times", noting that gravure fashion magazines for girls such as An An and Non-no often included European topics in their editorial coverage. She sees the fascination as stemming in part from sensitivities around depicting non-Japanese settings in manga in the aftermath of the Second World War, stating that "you could draw anything about America and Europe, but not so, about 'Asia' as seen in Japan".

Manga scholar Rebecca Suter asserts that the recurrence of Christian themes and imagery throughout the series – crucifixes, Bibles, churches, Madonnas and angels appear both in the diegesis and as symbolic representations in non-narrative artwork – can be seen as a sort of Occidentalism. Per Suter, Christianity's disapproval of homosexuality is represented primarily in Kaze to Ki no Uta as a narrative obstacle to be overcome by Gilbert and Serge as they pursue their relationship, a means to "complicate the plot and prolong the titillation for the reader". She argues that the series' appropriation of western religious symbols and attitudes for creative purposes "parallels and subverts" the Orientalist tendency to view Asia as more spiritual, "superstitious, and backwards".

Works by the Year 24 Group often used western literary tropes, especially those associated with the Bildungsroman genre, to stage what Midori Matsui describes as "a psychodrama of the adolescent ego". Takemiya has expressed ambivalence about that genre label being applied to Kaze to Ki no Uta; when artist Shūji Terayama described the series as a Bildungsroman, Takemiya responded that she "did not pay attention to such classification" when writing the series, and that when she heard Terayama's comments she "wondered what Bildungsroman was" as she "did not know literary categories". In this regard, several commentators have contrasted Kaze to Ki no Uta to Moto Hagio's The Heart of Thomas through their shared inspirations from the Bildungsroman novels of Hermann Hesse. Both Kaze and Thomas follow similar narrative trajectories, focusing on a tragic romance between boys in a European setting, and where the death of one boy figures heavily into the plot. Kaze to Ki no Uta is significantly more sexually explicit than both The Heart of Thomas and Hesse's novels, with anime and manga scholar Minori Ishida noting that "Takemiya in particular draws on latent romance and eroticism between some male characters in Hesse's writing". Midori Matsui considers Kaze to Ki no Uta as "ostensibly a Bildungsroman" that is "surreptitious pornography for girls" through its depiction of male characters who openly express and act upon their sexual desires, contrasting the largely non-sexual Heart of Thomas.

== Related media ==
=== Adaptations ===
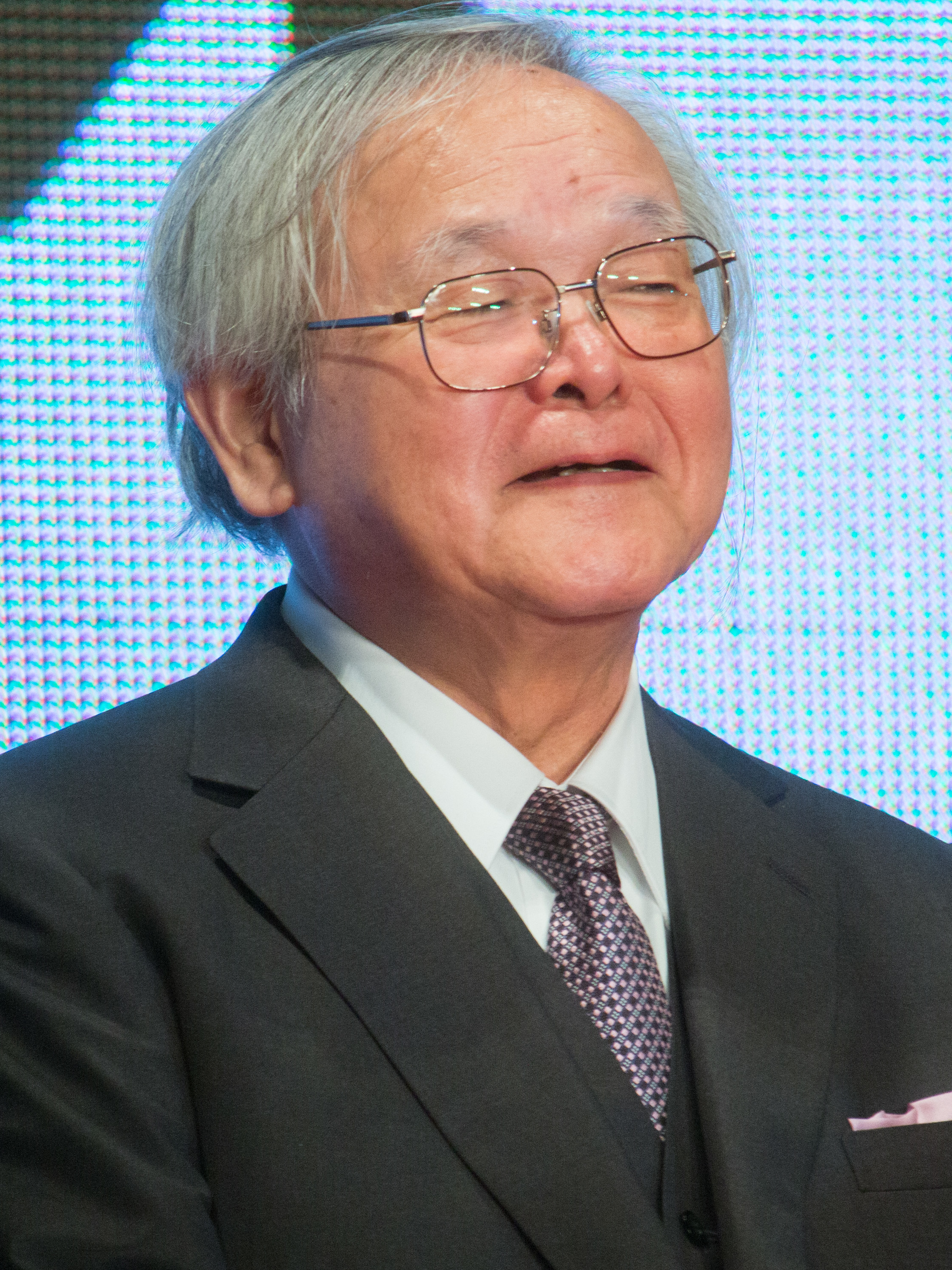
Yoshikazu Yasuhiko, director of the anime film adaptation of Kaze to Ki no Uta

An anime film adaptation, Kaze to Ki no Uta Sanctus: Sei Naru Kana, was released by Pony Canyon as an original video animation (OVA) on November 6, 1987. The sixty-minute film was produced by Shogakukan, Herald Enterprise, and Konami and directed by Yoshikazu Yasuhiko, with Sachiko Kamimura as animation director. Animation for the film was done in cooperation between Tranquilizer Product Company, Kugatsusha, Triangle Staff, and Tokyo Media Connections. (Note: Group Donguri, Doga Kobo, Studio AP, AC Pro, Wizard, Studio Max, Studio Wombat, Studio Musashi, Animaruya, and Warp are further credited for in-between animation. The Anime Encyclopedia states that the OVA was produced by "Studio Gallop, Konami Kogyo, [and] Herald", but Studio Gallop does not appear in the end credits of the film, and their website does not list the film. A 1987 advertisement in June credits Konami for "animation production/work" (アニメーション制作, animēshon seisaku).) The film's soundtrack, which features classical compositions by Bach and Chopin and original compositions by Nobuyuki Nakamura, was also released by Pony Canyon in 1987. Sanctus adapts the introductory chapters of the manga, bookended by scenes of a now-adult Serge re-visiting Lacombrade; multiple sequels were planned, but were never produced. Internationally, Sanctus was licensed by Italian distributor Yamato Video in 2006, which released the film as a DVD containing both the original Japanese audio and an Italian dub starring Marisa Della Pasqua as the voice of young Serge and Paola Della Pasqua as the voice of Gilbert.

A radio drama adapting the first volume of Kaze to Ki no Uta aired on TBS Radio, with Mann Izawa as scriptwriter and Hiromi Go as the voice of Gilbert. The series has also been adapted for the stage several times: by the theater company April House in May 1979, with Efu Wakagi as Gilbert and Shu Nakagawa as Serge; and in the early 1980s by an all-female troupe modeled on the Takarazuka Revue.

=== Tie-ins ===
Two Kaze to Ki no Uta image albums have been released by Nippon Columbia: the self-titled Kaze to Ki no Uta, composed by Seiji Yokoyama, in 1980; and Kaze to Ki no Uta: Gilbert no Requiem (風と木の詩 ジルベールのレクイエム, "Gilbert's Requiem"), composed by Osamu Shōji, in 1984. Kaze to Ki no Uta: Shinsesaizā Fantajī (風と木の詩 シンセサイザー・ファンタジー; "Synthesizer Fantasy"), a remix album of Gilbert no Requiem, was released in 1985.

In 1985, Shogakukan published Le Poème du Vent et des Arbres, an artist's book featuring original illustrations by Takemiya of characters from Kaze to Ki no Uta. Fukkan.com reprinted the book in 2018, with eight new illustrations and new scans of the original artwork produced by Genga' (Dash), an art preservation project Takemiya developed at Kyoto Seika University. In 2016, Takarajimasha published Shōnen no Uta (少年の詩; "The Poem of the Boy", alternatively titled Le Poème du Garçon), a limited edition artist's book containing thirty-two Kaze to Ki no Uta illustrations chosen by Takemiya and new illustrations originally drawn by Takemiya for her solo art exhibitions.

=== Sequels ===
Kami no Kohitsuji: Agnus Dei (神の子羊 Agnus Dei, "The Lamb of God: Agnus Dei"), a serial novel sequel to Kaze to Ki no Uta, was published in the yaoi magazine June from 1990 to 1994. The novel was written by Norie Masuyama, under the pen name Norisu Hāze. Takemiya produced eighty-one illustrations to accompany chapters in the series but otherwise had no creative involvement in Kami no Kohitsuji, instead granting permission to Masuyama to write a continuation of the manga series. Kami no Kohitsuji follows Henri (アンリ, Anri), a descendant of the Battour family, and Fran (フラン, Furan), a student at the Conservatoire de Paris, as they investigate what happened to Serge after the death of Gilbert. During their research, they encounter Matthieu (マシュウ, Mashū), a descendant of the Cocteau family related to Gilbert. The novel's chapters were collected into three hardcover volumes published by Kōfūsha Shuppan from 1992 to 1994, each featuring an original cover illustration by Takemiya. The hardcover editions were re-released by Fukkan.com in 2018, to mark Takemiya's 50th anniversary as a manga artist. The Fukkan.com re-release includes Takemiya's illustrations from the original June serialization, which were not included in the Kōfūsha Shuppan edition.

Kōfuku no Hato (幸福の鳩, "The Dove of Happiness") is a 48-page sequel and side story to Kaze to Ki no Uta. Set three years after Gilbert's death, the story focuses on the relationship between Jules and Rosemarine, who meet again by chance at Serge's piano concert in Paris. Kōfuku no Hato was written and illustrated by Takemiya, and was published in her artist's book Umi no Tenshi (海の天使, "Angel of the Sea", alternatively titled Chérubin de la Mer), released by Kadokawa Shoten in November 1991.

== Reception and legacy ==
=== Critical response ===
In 1980, Takemiya won the 25th (1979) Shogakukan Manga Award in both the shōjo and shōnen (manga for boys) categories for Kaze to Ki no Uta and Toward the Terra, respectively. Roughly 5 million copies of collected volumes of Kaze to Ki no Uta have been sold as of 2019.

Although some Japanese critics dismissed Kaze to Ki no Uta as a "second rate imitation" of The Heart of Thomas upon its initial release, it has received wide critical acclaim, and has been described as a "masterpiece" of the shōnen-ai genre. Masaki Satō, a gay writer who originated the yaoi ronsō debate of the 1990s, said he was "saved" by manga like Kaze to Ki no Uta, and poet and playwright Shūji Terayama compared the series' publication to "the great events that occurred in the Parisian literary world", likening it to Story of O by Anne Desclos and Justine by the Marquis de Sade and writing that "from now on, comics will probably be called 'Kaze to Ki no Uta and thereafter'". The series inspired several works: Kentaro Miura cited Kaze to Ki no Uta as an influence on his manga series Berserk, stating that both Kaze to Ki no Uta and The Rose of Versailles prompted him to change his approach to the series and write a story "with sad and painful human relationships and emotions"; Chiho Saito believes that Kaze to Ki no Uta heavily influenced the anime and manga series Revolutionary Girl Utena she developed as part of the artist collective Be-Papas, noting the many similarities between the works in a 2016 essay she wrote about Takemiya.

In an overview of the filmography of Yoshikazu Yasuhiko for Anime News Network, critic Michael Toole praised Kaze to Ki no Uta Sanctus: Sei Naru Kana as a "subtle piece" that is "vibrant and beautiful", favorably comparing it to the 1981 film adaptation of Takemiya's Natsu e no Tobira. (Note: Toole notes that unauthorized English fansub releases of Kaze to Ki no Uta Sanctus were typically included on the same VHS tape as Bronze: Zetsuai Since 1989 (1996) – a more overtly pornographic yaoi OVA – which Toole likens to "running Breakfast at Tiffany's back to back with Animal House".) In a review of the film for THEM Anime Reviews, Julian Malerman wrote that the short length of Sanctus makes it feel "like a prelude, or a summary" of the original manga, describing it as it "collection of compelling but largely disconnected scenes". He nonetheless offers praise for its visual direction, particularly its "gorgeous hand-painted background art" and character designs, and the central relationship between Gilbert and Serge, which he assesses as "solid enough, if rather melodramatic".

=== Impact ===
Kaze to Ki no Uta is credited with widely popularizing the shōnen-ai genre. Yukari Fujimoto writes that Kaze to Ki no Uta (along with The Heart of Thomas and Hi Izuru Tokoro no Tenshi) made male homosexuality part of "the everyday landscape of shōjo manga" and "one of its essential elements", and manga scholar Kazuko Suzuki cites Kaze to Ki no Uta as "one of the first attempts to depict true bonding or ideal relationships through pure male homosexual love". James Welker concurs that Kaze to Ki no Uta and The Heart of Thomas "almost certainly helped foster increasingly diverse male–male romance narratives within the broader shōjo manga genre from the mid-1970s onward".

In particular, Kaze to Ki no Uta contributed significantly to the development of male–male romance manga through its depiction of sex. Previously, sex in shōjo manga was confined almost exclusively to doujinshi (self-published manga); the popularity of Kaze to Ki no Uta prompted a boom in the production of commercially published shōnen-ai beginning in the late 1970s, and the development of a more robust yaoi doujinshi subculture. This trend towards sex-focused narratives in male–male romance manga accelerated with the founding of the manga magazine June in 1978, for which Takemiya was an editor and major contributor. June was the first major manga magazine to publish shōnen-ai and yaoi exclusively, and is credited with launching the careers of dozens of yaoi manga artists.

Kaze to Ki no Uta has been invoked in public debates on sexual expression in manga, particularly debates on the ethics and legality of manga depicting minors in sexual scenarios. In 2010, a revision to the Tokyo Metropolitan Ordinance Regarding the Healthy Development of Youths was introduced that would have restricted published media containing sexual depictions of characters who appeared to be minors, a proposal that was criticized by multiple anime and manga professionals for disproportionately targeting their industry. Takemiya wrote an editorial critical of the proposal in the May 2010 issue of Tsukuru, arguing that it was "ironic" that Kaze to Ki no Uta, a series that "many of today's mothers had grown up reading, was now in danger of being banned as 'harmful' to their children". In a 2016 interview with the BBC, Takemiya responded to the charge that depictions of rape in Kaze to Ki no Uta condone the sexualization of minors by stating that "such things do happen in real life. Hiding it will not make it go away. And I tried to portray the resilience of these boys, how they managed to survive and regain their lives after experiencing violence."
