= Sora ga Suki! =

Japanese manga series

- Cover of the second collected volume

空がすき!
- Genre: Comedy
- Created by: Keiko Takemiya
- Manga
- Published by: Shogakukan (Note: Collected editions of Sora ga Suki! have also been published by Kadokawa Shoten and Shōeisha.)
- Imprint: Flower Comics
- Magazine: Shūkan Shōjo Comic
- Original run: March 1971 – October 1972
- Volumes: 2
- Sequels
- Marude Haru no Yō Ni (1972); Noel! (1975)

Sora ga Suki! (Japanese: 空がすき!; lit. 'I Love the Sky!' or 'I Like the Sky!') is a Japanese manga series written and illustrated by Keiko Takemiya. It was originally serialized in the manga magazine Shūkan Shōjo Comic in two parts: from March to May 1971, and from August to October 1972. It was later published as a collected edition by Shogakukan, and was the first manga series by Takemiya to be published in this format.

The series follows a teenaged con artist in Montmartre who develops a friendship with the son of one of his marks. It is heavily influenced by musical theater, with characters expressing their feelings and emotions through dance and song lyrics, and its largely male cast composed of bishōnen (lit. "beautiful boys", a term for androgynous male characters) was atypical for shōjo manga (girls' manga) of the era. Sora ga Suki! was Takemiya's breakthrough work as a manga artist, and her first critical success as a creator. Two sequels, Marude Haru no Yō Ni (まるで春のように; 'Just Like Spring') and Noel!, were published in 1972 and 1975, respectively.

== Plot ==
=== Part 1 ===
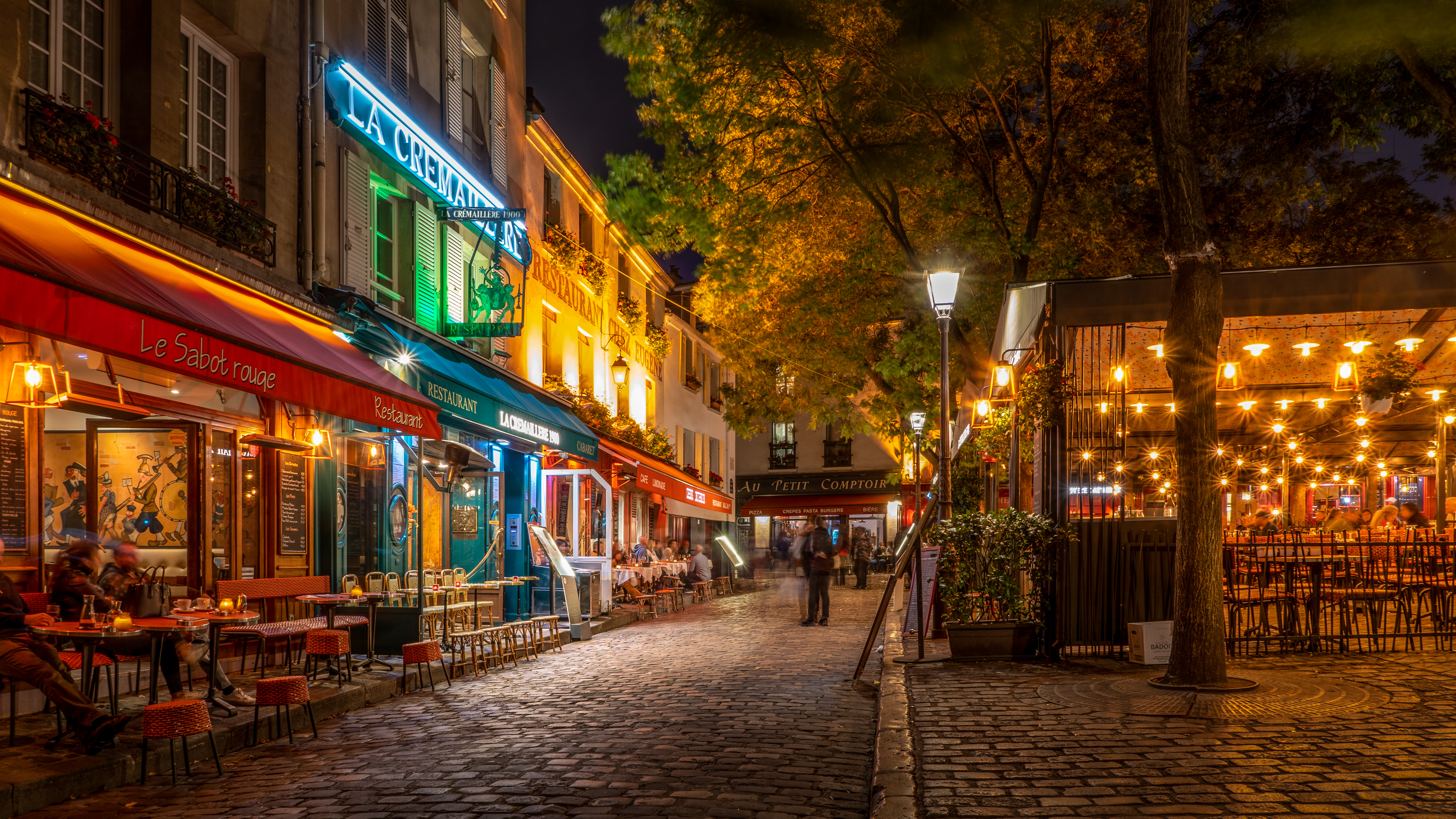
Montmartre, the setting of first part of the series

Fourteen-year-old con artist Tag Parisian (タグ・パリジャン, Tagu Parijan) arrives in Montmartre, Paris, where he quickly charms the denizens with his skill at music, singing, and dancing. He integrates himself with a famous local pianist and is hired to teach piano to Genet Hortense (ジュネ・オルタンス, June Orutansu), the upper-class son of the local police chief. Genet becomes aware of Tag's deception, and says he will remain silent if Tag agrees to be his friend. As Tag and Genet gradually grow closer, Tag begins to target Genet's wealthy mother for his next scheme. Torn between his life as a con artist and his friendship with Genet, he decides to leave Montmartre.

=== Part 2 ===
Sometime after Tag's departure, Genet has been transferred to a boarding school in Paris where he suffers under the social dominance of student Solmon Correll (ソルモン・コレル, Sorumon Koreru), the son of the mayor of Paris. He reunites with Tag, now selling poems written by a beggar named Bollocks (ボロックズ, Borokkuzu) that Tag misrepresents to buyers as written by "Claire Peynet" (クレール・ペイネ, Kurēru Peine), a famed poet. He sells a poem to a wealthy American businessman, who reveals he is aware that the poem is a forgery; the businessman wishes to verify the authenticity of a statue of The Bath of Venus owned by Solmon's father that is on display at the Louvre, and hires Tag to steal it. Tag accepts the job and steals the statue, which is determined to be a forgery made by Solmon. Bollocks reveals that he is in fact Claire Peynet, and that he holds the genuine statue, which he returns to the Louvre. In an epilogue, Tag and Genet are shown living happily together.

== Production ==
=== Development ===
In September 1970, Keiko Takemiya began drawing a manga tie-in for the television series Majoha Hottona Otoshi-goro in Shūkan Shōjo Comic, and took a brief hiatus at its conclusion at the end of the year to plot out her next serialization. Feeling confined by the creative constraints of writing an adaptation, she began to plan for her next work to be an original series. In her planning, Takemiya broadly focused the story of the series around two concepts – a manga musical and a shōjo manga (girls' manga) series that featured a bishōnen (lit. "beautiful boy", a term for androgynous male characters) as its protagonist.

Takemiya selected Paris as the setting for the series; at the time, she had developed an interest in Paris and was collecting film soundtracks of movies set in the city. As Takemiya had never travelled there, she purchased a variety of books and other materials related to the city for use as reference to incorporate its culture and customs into the series, particularly in regards to drawing clothing and buildings that were location-accurate.

The central characters of Sora ga Suki! were created before Takemiya conceived of the story, with Takemiya rationalizing that once the characters were established, they alone would be enough to appeal to readers. She chose the surname "Parisian" for Tag not only as a reference to Paris, but also because it was a last name that was clearly fake, and thus indicated his status as a con artist. She designed Genet, whose name is a reference to French writer Jean Genet, to contrast Tag: upper-class compared to Tag's low-born status, a police chief's son versus a con artist. The supporting characters, such as Genet's father, follow typical archetypes common in shōnen manga (boys' manga).

=== Release ===
When Takemiya submitted Sora ga Suki! to Shūkan Shōjo Comic editor Junya Yamamoto, she was chastised for creating a story with male protagonists – shōjo manga of the era featured female protagonists almost exclusively – but the series was accepted for publication. Takemiya speculated that the series was accepted because its depiction of male characters was seen as more palatable than that of Sunroom Nite, a shōnen-ai (male–male romance) manga she had published in the December 1970 issue of Bessatsu Shōjo Comic.

It was determined that Sora ga Suki! would begin serialization in the March 1971 issue of Shūkan Shōjo Comic and run for ten chapters, with an agreement made between Takemiya and Yamamoto that the series would be extended if it was received well by readers. However, the response was ultimately deemed insufficient thus ending the series with its tenth chapter in the May issue that same year. Following the conclusion of the series, Shūkan Shōjo Comic received an influx of letters from readers expressing disappointment that Sora ga Suki! had ended. Reflecting on these fan letters, Takemiya stated in her 2019 memoir The Boy's Name Is Gilbert:

While I was grateful for the response from fans, I also felt like, 'it's too late! If you had said something earlier, they might have extended the series!' I was a little irritated. (Note: Quoted in Japanese:「ファンのこの反応をありがたいと感じつつも、『遅いよ！もっと早く言ってくれれば連載が延びたかもしれないのに！』と少しいらついていたのだけれども」)

In response to these letters, Sora ga Suki! resumed serialization with a second part of the series starting in the August 1972 issue. However, Takemiya was no longer as enthusiastic about the series as she had previously been. The second part similarly ended after ten chapters, with the final installment published in the October 1972 issue of Shūkan Shōjo Comic.

==== Collected volumes ====
In October 1974, Sora ga Suki! was published as two tankōbon (collected edition) volumes by Shūkan Shōjo Comic publisher Shogakukan, under their Flower Comics imprint. It was the first manga by Takemiya to be published in this format. The first volume contains Rakuyō no Ki (落葉の記; 'The Chronicle of Fallen Leaves'), a 16-page preview of what would become her 1976 manga series Kaze to Ki no Uta (lit. 'The Poem of Wind and Trees'). The preview was included at the end of the volume without notice or explanation. Takemiya said she wanted to "expose" a part of Kaze to Ki no Uta, and she was curious to see how readers would react to it.

Multiple collected volume editions of Sora ga Suki! have been published:

- Sora ga Suki!, published by Shogakukan (Flower Comics), collected as:
  - Volume 1, released October 1, 1974 (ISBN 4-09-130021-9)
  - Volume 2, released December 1, 1974 (ISBN 4-09-130022-7)
- Sora ga Suki!, published by Shogakukan (Keiko Takemiya Works), collected as:
  - Volume 1, released October 15, 1978 (ISBN 4-09-178205-1)
  - Volume 2, released December 15, 1978 (ISBN 4-09-178206-X)
- Sora ga Suki!, published by Shogakukan (Shogakukan Bunko), collected as:
  - Volume 1, released February 1984 (ISBN 4-09-190736-9)
  - Volume 2, released May 1984 (ISBN 4-09-190737-7)
- Sora ga Suki!, published by Kadokawa Shoten (Asuka Comics DX), released September 1989 (ISBN 4-04-852128-4)
- Sora ga Suki!, published by Shōeisha (Masterpiece Manga Selection), released April 1995 (ISBN 4-88135-178-8)

=== Sequels ===
Marude Haru no Yō Ni (まるで春のように; 'Just Like Spring'), a sequel to Sora ga Suki!, was published in a special issue of Shūkan Shōjo Comic in 1972. It is a 40-page one-shot depicting the events in a town visited by Tag. A second sequel, Noel!, was published in two parts in the November and December 1975 issues of Bessatsu Shōjo Comic. The 120-page story continues the events of the original manga series. Both Marude Haru no Yō Ni and Noel! were included in the 1978 collected edition of Sora ga Suki! published by Shogakukan.

== Themes and analysis ==
=== Musical theater ===
Sora ga Suki! is influenced in plot and form by musical theater, with characters expressing their feelings and emotions through dance and song lyrics. In illustrating the series, Takemiya stated that she drew inspiration through the use of movement to indicate expression and meaning, and that she was particular about drawing motion lines that indicated character movement in order to communicate their emotions. Further, she felt she was able to express the vividness of youth by incorporating musical elements.

=== Shōnen-ai ===
The primary characters of Sora ga Suki! are all male, which was atypical for shōjo manga of the era. This, combined with the ambiguously homoerotic subtext attributed to the central friendship between Tag and Genet, led writer and sociologist Shunsuke Tsurumi to describe it as a shōnen-ai (male–male romance) manga. The second part of the series depicts a kiss between Tag and Genet; while it is depicted in-text as an expression of their friendship, it was nevertheless a taboo at the time for manga to portray male characters kissing. In the afterword of the 1984 collected edition, Takemiya described the kiss scene as "the most fun" she'd had as a manga artist since seeing her work in print for the first time. However, in her 2019 memoir The Boy's Name is Gilbert, she stated that she intended the kiss as an expression of the emotional drama between the characters, and that she ultimately viewed its inclusion as unnecessary in retrospect.

== Reception and influence ==
Sora ga Suki! was Takemiya's breakthrough work as a manga artist. It was her first critical success as a creator and helped establish a fan base for her manga, some of whom began to visit her at the Ōizumi Salon, the nickname for the rented house she shared with manga artist Moto Hagio that became an important gathering point for shōjo manga artists in the early 1970s.

Manga artist Mineo Maya (Patalliro!) has praised Sora ga Suki! for pushing forward depictions of fashion in manga, specifically noting the black and white spectator shoes worn by Tag, and evaluates the series as unique for its era in this regard. Manga artist Chiho Saito (Revolutionary Girl Utena) became aware of Takemiya after reading Sora ga Suki! while in junior high school; at the time she had developed an interest in films and musicals after watching West Side Story, and was impressed that a musical could be depicted in manga. She credits Sora ga Suki! with helping inspire her to become a manga artist. Aiko Itō also became a fan of Takemiya's after reading Sora ga Suki! and began visiting the Ōizumi Salon in fall 1972, becoming Takemiya's assistant shortly thereafter. She studied under Takemiya and made her debut as a manga artist in 1973.
