= Andromeda Stories =

Japanese manga series

- Cover of the first volume

アンドロメダ・ストーリーズ (Andoromeda Sutōrīzu)
- Genre: Drama, science fiction
- Manga
- Written by: Ryu Mitsuse
- Illustrated by: Keiko Takemiya
- Published by: Kodansha; Asahi Sonorama
- English publisher: NA: Vertical; Manga Planet
- Magazine: Manga Shōnen Monthly; Duo
- Original run: November 1980 – November 1982
- Volumes: 3
- Anime television film
- Directed by: Masamitsu Sasaki
- Written by: Masaki Tsuji
- Music by: Yuji Ohno
- Studio: Toei Animation
- Original network: Nippon TV
- Released: August 22, 1982
- Runtime: 85 minutes

Andromeda Stories (Japanese: アンドロメダ・ストーリーズ, Hepburn: Andoromeda Sutōrīzu) is a Japanese manga series written by Ryu Mitsuse and illustrated by Keiko Takemiya. It was serialized in Manga Shōnen Monthly and later Duo from November 1980 to November 1982. Its individual chapters were collected into three volumes. An anime television film adaptation premiered in August 1982.

Vertical published the manga in English. In 2019, Manga Planet added the manga to their service under the title Stories of Andromeda Galaxy.

== Plot ==
On the planet of Astria in the Andromeda Galaxy the Cosmoralian Empire is about to marry Prince Ithaca to Ayodoya's Princess Lilia, in the process crowning him King Astralta III. Unfortunately the happy couple's honeymoon is interrupted when sinister machines from another planet land and invade Astria, intent on eradicating all life, controlling human minds, and terraforming the once-green planet into a mechanical wasteland inhabited only by artificial life forms. After the King and his ministers are assimilated by the alien machines, the Queen Lilia and her newborn son Prince Jimsa must flee Astria. However the natives of Astria are not aware that exiles from the planet of Murat (the source of the enemy) have actually been selectively breeding the royal lines and Prince Jimsa is the ultimate fruit of their efforts. He is destined to lead their resistance against the alien machines.

== Reception ==
"It's a complicated mix of ideas. After Terra, though, nobody on this continent should be surprised by what Takemiya's capable of." — David F. Smith, Newtype USA.
