= Tenma no Ketsuzoku =

Japanese manga series by Keiko Takemiya

天馬の血族
- Genre: Adventure, fantasy
- Manga
- Written by: Keiko Takemiya
- Published by: Kadokawa Shoten
- Imprint: Asuka Comics
- Magazine: Asuka
- Original run: 1991 – 2000
- Volumes: 24

Tenma no Ketsuzoku (Japanese: 天馬の血族; lit. 'Bloodline of the Heavenly Horse'), also known as Crystal Lord Opera, is a Japanese fantasy manga series written and illustrated by Keiko Takemiya. It was serialized in Kadokawa Shoten's monthly shōjo manga magazine Asuka from 1991 to 2000, with its chapters collected in 24 tankōbon volumes.

== Plot ==
The manga is set in 12th-century Mongolia, in the time of Genghis Khan. It follows Altojin, a determined girl warrior with a mysterious tattoo. Abandoned as a child, Altojin grows up in the grassland plains of Chigul, in the Chigul Khanate (チグル汗国, Chiguru Hankoku).

One day she goes on a hunting trip with the Prince Olsbolt and saves him from an assassination attempt. Prince Olsbolt thinks the assassin was sent by his father, who is also the ruler of Chigul. He decides to kill his father, and in doing so he also takes back his former lover, who had been married to his father. After killing his father the khan, Olsbolt hides at Altojin's house. A dramatic event happens. While they are out for a while, Altojin's family is slaughtered.

It is up to the reader to discover the fate of Altojin and Prince Olsbolt, and what role the mysterious tattoo plays in the story.

== Characters ==
Altojin (アルトジン, Arutojin)
A determined girl warrior who was raised in the grassland plains of Chigul. Although she was abandoned as a child, she is in fact of royal descent.
Prince Olsbolt (オルスボルト, Orusuboruto)
The Prince of Chigul and the son of the ruling sovereign, Bilge Khan.
Ismail (イスマイル, Isumairu)
Prince Olsbolt's half-brother.
Am Mahal (アムマハル, Amumaharu)
The King of Palmis, said to be the country of merchants.
Ratuya (ラトゥヤ)
A shrine princess and the twin sister of Sihel.
Sihel (シヘル, Shiheru)
The twin sister of Ratuya.
Bilge Khan (ビルゲ大汗, Biruge Hān)
The khan of Chigul.

== Publication ==
Tenma no Ketsuzoku was written and illustrated by Keiko Takemiya. It was serialized in Kadokawa Shoten's monthly shōjo manga magazine Asuka, starting in the January 1991 issue. It concluded in the magazine's January–February 2000 issue. The series was collected in 24 tankōbon or trade paperback volumes published by Kadokawa Shoten's Asuka Comics imprint from 1991 to 2000. Its early chapters were also collected in a three-volume omnibus edition published by the company's Asuka Comics Deluxe imprint from 1991 to 1992. The complete series was re-released in eight kanzenban or "perfect edition" volumes published by Kadokawa Shoten's Tankōbon Comics imprint in 2003.
