= Majokko Tickle =

Television series

- Majokko Tickle DVD vol. 2 cover

魔女っ子チックル (Majokko Chikkuru)
- Genre: Magical girl, comedy
- Created by: Go Nagai
- Anime television series
- Directed by: Takashi Hisaoka
- Written by: Mitsuru Majima; Masaki Tsuji; Akiyoshi Sakai
- Studio: Nippon Sunrise (Note: Animation studio); Toei Company (Note: Production company)
- Original network: ANN (TV Asahi)
- Original run: March 6, 1978 – January 29, 1979
- Episodes: 45
- Manga
- Written by: Go Nagai
- Illustrated by: Yuki Narumi
- Published by: Akita Shoten
- Magazine: Hitomi
- Original run: April 1978 – February 1979
- Volumes: 1
- Manga
- Written by: Go Nagai
- Illustrated by: Peko Natsumi
- Published by: Shogakukan
- Magazine: Shogaku Ichinensei
- Original run: May 1978 – July 1978
- Manga
- Written by: Go Nagai
- Illustrated by: Miko Arasu
- Published by: Shogakukan
- Magazine: Yochien
- Original run: June 1978 – August 1978

Majokko Tickle (魔女っ子チックル, Majokko Chikkuru), also known as Magical Girl Tickle or Tickle the Witch Girl, is a 1970s magical girl manga and anime by Go Nagai. Unlike Nagai's earlier Cutie Honey, Majokko Tickle is much similar in structure to Toei Animation's previous slate of magical girl series, with a younger demographic than the former.

The anime television series was produced by Toei Company in association with Kaze Productions and Neomedia and animated by Nippon Sunrise. It consisted of 45 episodes and was aired across Japan on TV Asahi from March 6, 1978, to January 29, 1979.

== Story ==
Chiko, a shy Japanese schoolgirl, receives a book as a gift from her father on her thirteenth birthday. When Chiko opens the book, she releases Tickle (pronounced "Chikkuru" in Japanese, similarly to "Chiko"), a mischievous witch who was imprisoned inside the book for playing pranks on people. At first, Chiko doesn't believe Tickle is a witch, and tells her to prove it. Tickle delivers Chiko's scarf to her friend Miko (who had just moved to Hokkaido, and promised to be around for Chiko's birthday). Once Chiko realizes the truth, she is happy to befriend Tickle. Tickle casts a spell, and Chiko is surprised when her mother tells her and her "sister" Tickle to come down for dinner. Tickle reveals that in order to avoid awkward questions about where she came from, she will pass herself off as Chiko's twin sister. Tickle uses her powers to solve everyday problems and, of course, to continue playing tricks on people (particularly Chiko's annoying kid sister, Hina).

Like other magical girls, Tickle has a special phrase she uses to cast a spell: "Maharu Tamara Furampa" (translated as "Sparkle, Twinkle, Magic will be").

Although the series is mostly light-hearted and whimsical, episodes contain a few serious themes, such as children being teased for being overweight or ugly. The series also features a reversal of expectations, as Tickle is from another world, and does things in her own unique way.

== Characters ==
=== Lucky Pair ===
- Tickle Komori (小森チックル) Voiced by: Rihoko Yoshida

A mischievous witch who was imprisoned in a book for playing tricks before being freed by Chiko (although she claims to be a magical princess on the run from a dragon). She decides to stay around for a while, and uses her magic to manipulate everyone's memories, making them believe she has always been Chiko's twin sister. Although she loves playing tricks, she doesn't hesitate to use her magic to solve problems. Though being part of a family is a new experience for Tickle, magic can't solve problems she doesn't understand. Tickle's hair is typically in twintails. She is between 12–13 years. Tickle was renamed Lilli in the Italian dub.

- Chiko Komori (小森チーコ) Voiced by: Yoko Asagami, Keiko Han in the final episode

A very shy girl, she is the one who freed Tickle, and now lives with her, posing as twins. She had just lost her best friend when she received the book containing Tickle. She is usually against Tickle's use of magic. She is 13–14 years. Her birthday is March 2nd. Chiko was renamed Mirtilla in the Italian dub, and in the French version her name was semi-romanized to Cheko.

=== Family ===
- Hina Komori (小森ヒナ) Voiced by: Toyoko Komazawa

The bratty 4 or 5-year-old little sister of Chiko and (presumably) Tickle. She loves nothing more than butting into whatever her "sisters" are doing. She often gets her comeuppance via Tickle's magic. Naturally, nobody believes her when she claims to have seen Tickle using magic.

- Fuyuyoshi Komori (小森冬吉) Voiced by: Hiroshi Ohtake

The father of Chiko, Hina and (presumably) Tickle, he is the one who gave Chiko the book containing Tickle.

- Haruko Komori (小森春子) Voiced by: Haruko Kitahama

The mother of Chiko, Hana and (presumably) Tickle, she is a loving and kind woman.

=== Middle school ===
==== Tickle's classmates ====
- Donta (山谷ドン太) Voiced by: Hiroshi Ohtake

The fat trouble maker at Tickle and Chiko's school (similar to Boss in Nagai's Mazinger Z). He has two friends (or "underlings") - Ago and Pochi. They all befriend Tickle and Chiko.

- Ago (アゴ) Voiced by: Isamu Tanonaka

One of Donta's two best friends, he is modeled after Alphonne from Nagai's "Kikkai-kun" manga.

- Pochi (ポチ) Voiced by: Sachiko Chijimatsu

One of Donta's two best friends, he is modeled after Dr. Pochi from Nagai's Kikkai-kun manga.

- Fuuko (フー子, Fūko) Voiced by: Keiko Yamamoto

The heavy-set girl in Chiko and Tickle's class, she is teased at school for her weight. Tickle encourages her to do her best.

- Tadashi Yoshikawa (吉川正) Voiced by: Keiko Yamamoto

A serious and handsome boy who's a class representative.

- Satomi Yano (矢野さとみ) Voiced by: Haruko Kitahama

The resident "rich-girl", she is very snobby, and usually causes problems for Chiko.

==== Other students ====
- Saburo (錦三郎, Kinsaburō/Kinzaburō)) Voiced by: Akira Kamiya

A boy that Tickle and Chiko both have a crush on.

==== Teachers and school staff ====
- Mr. Takakura (高倉先生, Takakura-sensei) Voiced by: Hiroshi Masuoka

Tickle and Chiko's teacher, he is very silly, and clumsy. Takakura-sensei has a crush on Hanamura-sensei.

- Miss Hanamura (花村先生, Hanamura-sensei) Voiced by Kazuko Sugiyama

The beautiful teacher at Chiko and Tickle's school.

- School Principal (校長先生, Kōchōsensei) Voiced by Shunji Yamada
- School Vice Principal (教頭先生, Kyōtōsensei) Voiced by Jōji Yanami

=== Magic Kingdom ===
- King Ojyama (オジャマ大王, Ōjama Daiō) Voiced by: Kenichi Ogata

The king of the Magic Kingdom, he is green, red and white, and has a magical wand. He appears in the last episode, demanding Tickle to return.

== Production ==
Majokko Tickle is the first Toei-produced magical girl series since Majokko Megu-chan, which had finished airing in September 1975. The premise of the series, which features "double heroines" (consisting of Tickle and her human "twin sister" Chiko, a "lucky pair" as described in the series), was reportedly based on the pop duo Pink Lady's performing style, involving singing and dancing in unison. The duo was tremendously popular at the time of the series's inception, with their song "Southpaw" later being utilized in an episode of the show as Tickle, Chiko, and Hina watch them perform on television.

Masaki Tsuji, longtime friend of Nagai and head writer on his earlier series Devilman, Dororon Enma-kun, and Cutie Honey, contributed scripts to Tickle. Lyrics to the opening theme were written by Nagai. Animation was not contributed to by Toei's animation department themselves, instead outsourced to Nippon Sunrise.

== Distribution ==
=== Foreign dubbing ===
The series was dubbed into other languages and broadcast in several other countries, including Italy (Lilli, un guaio tira l'altro), France (Magique Tickle, drole de fee or "Tickle the Funny Fairy"), Turkey, and Poland (Magiczne Igraszki).

In Italy, the opening theme song was an instrumental version of the original Japanese theme by Mitsuko Horie, and the Polish version (aired on Polonia 1) retains the original Japanese vocal themes, but an entirely different song was used in the French version. The Polish dub does not feature actual Polish voice actors, but simply a reading of Polish-language dialogue by a female voiceover artist over the original Japanese dialogue. A Spanish dub, titled Cosquillas Mágicas, was also aired in Spain on the Antena 3 network. The Italian, French and Spanish dubs also have completely replaced the music and effects track from the original Japanese version.

=== Home media ===
Since the copyright of the series belongs to Toei Co. Ltd. and not Toei Animation, a VHS and LD release was not possible. Additionally due to this situation, Tickle's appearance in the 1999 role-playing video game Majokko Daisakusen: Little Witching Mischiefs (which featured magical girls from Toei Animation TV series from 1966 to 1981, including Cutie Honey, Megu-chan, Sally, and Akko-chan among others) was not possible. The series had been released for the home video market by Toei Video in Japan in 4 DVD sets of two discs between 2005 and 2006.

== Anime staff ==
Source: Anime News Network; Anime Memorial, The Anime Encyclopedia by Jonathan Clements and Helen McCarthy

- Original creator: Go Nagai
- Series director: Takashi Kuoka
- Direction: Atsushi Takagi, Tôru Sakata, Takashi Hisaoka, Tôru Sakata, Yûji Uchida, Kenji Nakano, Fumio Tashiro
- Script: Mitsuru Majima, Tatsuo Tamura, Yoshimi Shinozaki, Sukehiro Tomita, Hirohisa Soda, Akiyoshi Sakai, Naoko Miyake, Masaki Tsuji, Kunihiko Yuyama, Kôzô Takagaki, Yû Yamamoto, Toyohiro Andô, Tomoko Konparu
- Storyboard: Hideo Yamada, Atsushi Takagi, Shûji Iuchi, Hiroshi Ashibe, Katsutoshi Sasaki, Kunihiko Yuyama, Watake Na
- Character designs: Hiroshi Takahisa, Osamu Motohara
- Animation directors: Takeshi Tamazawa, Yûji Uchida, Kanji Hara, Masuo Ani, Yoshiteru Kobayashi, Otojirô Katô
- Backgrounds: Shin Kato
- Music: Takeo Watanabe
- Theme song lyrics: Go Nagai (OP), Saburo Yatsude (a pseudonym for the collective Toei - not Toei Animation - staff) (ED)
- Theme song performance: Mitsuko Horie (OP- Majokko Tickle, ED- Tickle and Tiko's Cha-cha-cha)
- Production: Neomedia/Nippon Sunrise/Kaze Pro for Toei Company Ltd.
