= Keiko Takemiya =

Japanese manga artist

Keiko Takemiya 竹宮 惠子
- Born: February 13, 1950 (age 76) Tokushima, Tokushima Prefecture
- Area: Manga artist
- Notable works: Kaze to Ki no Uta; Toward the Terra
- Awards: Seiun Award (1978); Shogakukan Manga Award (1980); Avon Achievement Award (2001); Japan Cartoonists Association Award (2012); Medal of Honor with Purple Ribbon (2014)

Keiko Takemiya (竹宮 惠子, Takemiya Keiko; born February 13, 1950) is a Japanese manga artist, professor and university administrator. As part of the Year 24 Group, she was a leading figure in shōjo manga scene in the 1970s creating such manga as Kaze to Ki no Uta, Toward the Terra, Natsu e no Tobira. Additionally she became head of the Faculty of Manga at Kyoto Seika University, and then later became the president of the university.

== Career ==
Keiko Takemiya is included in the Year 24 Group, a term coined by academics and critics to refer to a group of female authors in the early 1970s who helped transform shōjo manga (manga for girls) from being created primarily by male authors to being created by female authors. These women were born in the year 1949 in the Gregorian calendar, or Shōwa 24 – the 24th year of the Shōwa era in the Japanese calendar which resulted in the name "Year 24".

The addition of realism to the stories of Takemiya, as well as other shōjo manga creators such as Moto Hagio, and Yumiko Oshima is cited as a reason for the increased popularity of the genre.

As part of the Year 24 Group, Takemiya pioneered a genre of shōjo manga about love between young men called shōnen-ai (lit. "boy love"). In 1970, she published a historical short story titled Sunroom Nite ("In the Sunroom") in Bessatsu Shōjo Comic, which is possibly the first shōnen-ai manga ever published. Illustrating a tragic romance between a Romani boy and his wealthy classmate, it contains the earliest known male–male kiss in shōjo manga.

Takemiya cites her influences as being shōnen manga (manga for boys), the works of Shotaro Ishinomori, films, and documentaries. In 1972, after publishing Sora ga Suki! (空がすき！; "I Love the Sky!"), Takemiya traveled to Europe to learn more about life there as research for Kaze to Ki no Uta ("The Poem of Wind and Trees"). After that, she traveled to different parts of Europe on an almost annual basis.

Among her best known works are the manga Kaze to Ki no Uta and Toward the Terra, which are noted for being pioneering series of the 1970s and 1980s. She received the 9th Seiun Award for best science fiction manga for Toward the Terra in 1978, and the 25th (1979) Shogakukan Manga Award in the shōjo and shōnen category for both Kaze to Ki no Uta and Toward the Terra in 1980. She is regarded as "one of the first successful crossover women artists" to create both shōjo and shōnen manga. Many of her series have been adapted into anime, including Toward the Terra in 1980 and 2007, Natsu e no Tobira ("The Door into Summer") in 1981, Andromeda Stories in 1982, and Kaze to Ki no Uta in 1987. In 1983, Takemiya served as a special designer on the theatrical anime film Crusher Joe: The Movie, alongside other notable manga artists.

Since 2000, Takemiya has taught at Kyoto Seika University's Faculty of Manga. That university is the only one in Japan with its own manga department as well as a museum showcasing manga art. In 2010, the university offered a Masters graduate degree, where Takemiya would teach. She served as Dean of the Faculty of Manga from April 2008 until March 2013. She was also president of the university from April 2014 to March 2018. During her tenure at Kyoto Seika, Takemiya started the Genga' (Dash) (原画ダッシュ) project, which uses digital technology to create accurate reproductions of manga artwork and manuscripts, for both its preservation and to produce material suitable for art exhibitions, with a focus on shōjo manga art.

In 2001, she received the Avon Achievement Award for women who contribute to society. From 2009 to 2014, she served as a member of the selection committee for the Tezuka Osamu Cultural Prizes. In 2012, she received the Japan Cartoonists Association's Minister of Education, Culture, Sports, Science and Technology Award in recognition of her entire body of work. In 2014, she was awarded the Medal of Honor with Purple Ribbon by the Ministry of Internal Affairs and Communications of Japan for her contributions to manga.

In January 2016, Takemiya published her first autobiography, Shōnen no Na wa Gilbert (少年の名はジルベール, Shōnen no Na wa Jirubēru; "The Boy's Name Is Gilbert"). The book documents the shōjo manga revolution of the 1970s and the creation of Kaze to Ki no Uta and Toward the Terra. In March 2021, she published her second autobiography, Tobira wa Hiraku Iku Tabi mo: Jidai no Shōgen-sha (扉はひらくいくたびも 時代の証言者; "The Door Opens Every Time: A Witness of the Times"). Its text was compiled from Takemiya's interviews with journalist Keiko Chino, first published in the Jidai no Shōgen-sha column of the Yomiuri Shimbun newspaper.

Takemiya's work is featured in the catalogue for The Citi Exhibition: Manga (2019), including an interview where she discusses the Genga (Dash) project (pages 253-267).

In 2019, the Japanese Diet proposed and then ultimately withdrew a bill that could increase copyright control on the internet for publishers. Takemiya opposed the bill, saying it could harm the creation of fan fiction. "Fan fiction represents a love for manga", Takemiya said. "We don't want the close relationship between artists and fans to collapse."

== Works ==
- Ringo no Tsumi (りんごの罪; "The Sin of the Apple"), 1968
- Sunroom Nite (サンルームにて, "In the Sunroom"), 1970
- Sora ga Suki! (空がすき！, "I Love the Sky!"), 1971–1972
- Wedding License (ウェディング・ライセンス, Wedingu Raisensu), 1973
- Hensōkyoku (変奏曲シリーズ; "Variation"), with Norie Masuyama, 1974–1985
- Pharaoh no Haka (ファラオの墓, Farao no Haka; "The Pharaoh's Tomb"), 1974–1976
- Natsu e no Tobira (夏への扉; "The Door into Summer"), 1975
- Kaze to Ki no Uta (風と木の詩; "The Poem of Wind and Trees"), 1976–1984
- Sobakasu no Shōnen (そばかすの少年; "The Freckled Boy"), 1979–1980
- Watashi o Tsuki made Tsuretette! (私を月まで連れてって！; "Fly Me to the Moon!"), 1981–1986
- Toward the Terra (地球へ..., Tera e...), 1977–1980
  - First published in English by Vertical as To Terra..., later by Manga Planet as Toward the Terra
- Andromeda Stories (アンドロメダ・ストーリーズ, Andoromeda Sutōrīzu), with Ryu Mitsuse (original story,) 1980–1982
  - First published in English by Vertical as Andromeda Stories, later by Manga Planet as Stories of Andromeda Galaxy
- Izarōn Densetsu (イズァローン伝説; "The Legend of Izaron"), 1982–1987
- Eden 2185 (エデン2185, Eden Ni Ichi Hachi Go), 1984
- 5:00 PM Revolution, 1985–1988
- Spanish Harlem (スパニッシュ・ハーレム, Supanisshu Hāremu), 1988–1990
- Hayate no Matsuri-goto (疾風のまつりごと; "The Gale Festival"), 1990–1993
- Tenma no Ketsuzoku (天馬の血族; "Bloodline of the Heavenly Horse"), 1991–2000
- Kurenai Niō (紅にほふ; "The Scent of Crimson"), 1994–1995
- Hermès no Michi (エルメスの道, Erumesu no Michi; "The Path of Hermès"), 1997
- Heian Jōruri Monogatari (平安情瑠璃物語; "A Heian Jōruri Tale"), 1998–1999
- Bright no Yūutsu (ブライトの憂鬱, Buraito no Yūutsu; "Bright's Melancholy"), 2000–2004

== Awards and honors ==
- 2025 – Person of Cultural Merit
