= Masaki Tsuji =

Japanese anime producer, author, & writer

- 辻 真先
- Born: March 23, 1932 (age 94); Nagoya, Aichi Prefecture, Japan
- Occupations: Producer, scriptwriter, writer, critic, planner
- Writing career
- Language: Japanese
- Genres: Anime, manga, novels
- Website: 2323.la.coocan.jp

Masaki Tsuji (辻 真先, Tsuji Masaki; born March 23, 1932 in Nagoya) is a Japanese anime screenwriter, mystery writer, manga author, travel critic, essayist, professor as well as mystery fiction novels writer. Tsuji was most active in the business from the 1960s through the 1980s, and worked as a script writer on many popular anime television series for Mushi Production, Toei Animation, and Tokyo Movie Shinsha.

He is well known for his association with the animated adaptations of the works of Osamu Tezuka and Go Nagai.

In April 2007, Tsuji headed Japan's first international anime research lab as part of Digital Hollywood University. On December 4, 2007, Tsuji was given a lifetime achievement award at the 11th Japan Media Arts Festival. On September 24, 2008, Tsuji won a Special Award in the 13th Animation Kobe for his writing work.

== Filmography ==
List of production work in anime
Year	Title	Crew role	Notes	Source
1963–66	Astro Boy	Writer		
1963–64	8 Man	Writer		
1965–66	Super Jetter	Writer		
1965–67	Space Boy Soran	Writer		
1965–69	Obake no Q-tarō	Writer		
1965–67	Kimba the White Lion	Writer	Also ending theme	
1966–67	Leo the Lion	Writer	Also ending theme	
1966	Marine Boy	Writer		
1966–68	Sally the Witch	Writer		
1967–68	Perman	Writer		
1967–68	Princess Knight	Writer		
1967	ja:冒険ガボテン島	Writer		
1967–68	ja:冒険少年シャダー	Writer		
1968	ja:おかしなおかしな星の国	Writer	Film	
1968–72	GeGeGe no Kitarō series	Writer	TV series 1, 2	
1968–68	すばらしい世界旅行 ニューヨークの旅 "コンピュートピア 西暦2000年の物語"	Writer		
1968	ja:わんぱく探偵団	Writer		
March 1968–71	Kyojin no Hoshi	Writer	Also film in 1969, 1970, 1982	
1968	ja:アニマル1	Writer		
1968	Cyborg 009	Writer		
1968	Akane-chan	Writer		
1968–69	The Vampires	Writer	Drama	
1969	Hakkutsu ワンダー君の初夢宇宙旅行	Writer	Also opening	
1969–70	Himitsu no Akko-chan	Writer		
1969	Undersea Boy Marine	Writer	Rerun in 1971	
1969–70	Mōretsu Atarō	Writer		
1969	ja:六法やぶれクン	Writer		
1969	Flying Phantom Ship	Writer	Film, Also ending	
1969–71	Tiger Mask	Writer	Also anime film	
1969–	Sazae-san	Writer		
1969–71	Attack No. 1	Writer		
1970	ja:ばくはつ五郎	Writer		
1970–71	Kick no Oni	Writer		
1970–71	Norakuro	Writer		
1970–71	Mahō no Mako-chan	Writer		
1971	ja:珍豪ムチャ兵衛	Writer		
1971–72	Shin Obake no Q-tarō	Writer		
1971–72	Tensai Bakabon	Writer		
1971–72	Sarutobi Ecchan	Writer		
1971–72	Tensai Bakabon	Writer		
1972	Triton of the Sea	Writer		
1972	Mahōtsukai Chappy	Writer	Also film	
1972	ja:アニメドキュメント ミュンヘンへの道	Writer		
1972–73	Devilman	Writer		
1972	ja:魔犬ライナー0011変身せよ!	Writer		
1972–74	Dokonjō Gaeru	Writer		
1972–73	隆一まんが劇場 おんぶおばけ	Writer		
1973	Babel II	Writer		
1973	Doraemon	Writer		
1973	Microsuperman	Writer		
1973–74	Miracle Girl Limit-chan	Writer		
1973–74	Dororon Enma-kun	Writer		
1973–74	Cutie Honey	Writer		
1974–75	Majokko Megu-chan	Writer		
1974–75	Jim Button	Writer		
1975	ja:これがUFOだ!空飛ぶ円盤	Writer		
1975–76	Brave Raideen	Writer		
1975–83	World Famous Fairy Tale Series	Writer	Short films	
1975–76	The Adventures of Pepero	Writer		
1975–82	Ikkyū-san series	Writer	Also films	
1976	ja:マシンハヤブサ	Writer		
1976–77	Chōdenji Robo Combattler V series	Writer	Also films	
1977	Jetter Mars	Writer		
1977–78	Barbapapa	Writer		
1977	ja:氷河戦士ガイスラッガー	Writer		
1977–78	Chōdenji Machine Voltes V	Writer		
1977–78	Arrow Emblem: Hawk of the Grand Prix	Writer		
1978–79	Majokko Tickle	Writer		
1978–79	Captain Future series	Writer	Also films	
1979–80	Cyborg 009	2nd TV series		
1979	Tōshō Daimos	Writer	film	
1979–80	Mirai Robo Daltanious	Writer		
1979	Jean Valjean Monogatari ja:ジャン･バルジャン物語	Writer		
1979	Ganbare!! Tabuchi-kun!!	Writer	film	
1980–81	Lalabel	Writer		
1980–81	Space Emperor God Sigma	Writer		
1980	Ganbare!! Tabuchi-kun!! 2: Gekitō Pennant Race	Writer	film	
1980	Makoto-chan	Writer	film	
1980–82	Ojamanga Yamada-kun	Writer		
1981	The Fantastic Adventures of Unico	Writer		
1981–86	Dr. Slump	Writer		
1981	21エモン 宇宙へいらっしゃい!	Writer		
1981	Natsu e no Tobira	Writer	film	
1981	ja:ぼくらマンガ家 トキワ荘物語	Writer		
1981–82	Honey Honey no Suteki na Bouken	Writer		
1982–83	Asari-chan	Writer		
1982	Andromeda Stories	Writer		
1982–84	ja:さすがの猿飛	Writer		
1982–84	ja:フクちゃん	Writer		
1983	ひなまつりアニメファンタジー! 宇宙の果てまで冒険旅行 ロマンチック銀河ツアーへの御招待!!	Composition	film	
1984	The Star of Cottonland	Writer	Film	
1984	Giant Gorg	Writer		
1984	God Mazinger	Writer		
1984–85	Galactic Patrol Lensman	Scenario		
1988	Sekai meisaku dowa shirizu 世界名作童話シリーズ	Writer	OVA	
1994	Maps	Writer		
2015	Concrete Revolutio	Writer	Ep. 9	

== See also ==
- Honkaku Mystery Writers Club of Japan
