= Toward the Terra =

Japanese manga series & its adaptations

- Cover of LaserDisc release of the film depicting Soldier Blue

地球へ… (Tera e...)
- Genre: Space opera
- Manga
- Written by: Keiko Takemiya
- Published by: Asahi Sonorama (original); Square Enix (reprint)
- English publisher: NA: Manga Planet (digital); US: Vertical
- Magazine: Gekkan Manga Shōnen
- Original run: January 1977 – May 1980
- Volumes: 5 (3 in English)
- Audio drama
- Station: NHK-FM
- Original run: July 23, 1979 – July 28, 1979
- Anime film
- Directed by: Hideo Onchi
- Written by: Chiho Shioda; Hideo Onchi
- Music by: Masaru Sato
- Studio: Toei Animation
- Licensed by: NA: Crunchyroll
- Released: April 26, 1980
- Runtime: 115 minutes
- Anime television series
- Directed by: Osamu Yamazaki
- Produced by: Hirofumi Morotomi; Ai Abe; Norihiro Hayashida
- Written by: Satoru Nishizono
- Music by: Yasuharu Takanashi
- Studio: Tokyo Kids; Minamimachi Bugyōsho
- Licensed by: NA: Bandai Entertainment
- Original network: JNN (MBS TV)
- English network: SEA: Animax Asia
- Original run: April 7, 2007 – September 22, 2007
- Episodes: 24
- Manga

Terra e... ~Keith of the Blue Light~
- Written by: Fumino Hayashi
- Published by: Square Enix
- Magazine: GFantasy
- Original run: May 2007 – March 2008
- Volumes: 2

Toward the Terra (Japanese: 地球(テラ)へ…, Hepburn: Tera e...) is a Japanese science fiction manga series by Keiko Takemiya. It was originally serialized in Asahi Sonorama's Gekkan Manga Shōnen magazine, between January 1977 and May 1980. In 1978, it won the first Seiun Award for manga, and in 1980 also won the Shogakukan Manga Award for shōnen/shōjo manga (along with Takemiya's Kaze to Ki no Uta).

In 1980, it was adapted into an anime movie, produced by Toei Animation and directed by Hideo Onchi. In 2007, the manga was adapted into an anime television series, co-animated by Minamimachi Bugyōsho and Tokyo Kids, and produced by Aniplex, SKY Perfect Well Think, and Mainichi Broadcasting System. Directed by Osamu Yamazaki and featuring character designs by Nobuteru Yuki, it premiered in Japan on MBS-TBS's Saturday 6:00 pm doroku time slot (previously occupied by other notable anime series such as Mobile Suit Gundam SEED, Fullmetal Alchemist and Blood+) on April 7, 2007, and ended on September 22, 2007, replacing the canceled Bones series Tenpō Ibun Ayakashi Ayashi.

== Plot ==
The story takes place in the distant future sometime after the 31st millennium (at least 301st century) where humanity exists under the rule of the political order controlled by supercomputers known as Superior Dominance and the carefully selected humans known as the Members Elite. Centuries before the story begins, the human race came to the conclusion that war and pollution rendered life on Earth unsustainable. Using warp travel the decision was made to leave a supercomputer artificial general intelligence and caretaker humans behind and colonize distant stars.

Under the rule of Superior Dominance all humans are born in vitro and given to carefully selected parents. At the age of 14, all children are put through brainwashing where their memories are wiped by Superior Dominance and overwritten to produce functional adults. A race of advanced humans with psionic abilities called Mu (pronounced myuu, μ) has evolved, and the supercomputers that control Superior Dominance make every effort to exterminate them. Led by Soldier Blue and then Soldier Shin, the Mu make every effort to locate and rescue as many Mu children as possible before the children are discovered and eliminated. The Mu have only one wish, to return to what they see as their promised land, Terra.

The series spans a large number of years, jumping back and forth multiple times, from Soldier Shin's life on Ataraxia, the various events on Station E-1077, Soldier Shin's founding of a Mu colony on a habitable planet, Neska, the Superior Dominance war of extermination on the Mu, and finally to the Mu's return to Terra.

=== Main characters ===
- Jomy Marcus Shin (ジョミー・マーキス・シン, Jomī Mākisu Shin) – A student from Ataraxia who carries the Mu factor; becomes a powerful Type Blue and succeeds Soldier Blue as leader of the Mu. Voiced by: Junichi Inoue (1980), Mitsuki Saiga (2007 TV series).
- Keith Anyan (キース・アニャン, Kīsu Anyan) – Raised in a test tube; an elite SD-system officer who rises to lead humanity and ultimately turns against Grandmother. Voiced by: Masaya Oki (1980), Takehito Koyasu (2007 TV series).
- Soldier Blue (ソルジャー・ブルー, Sorujā Burū) – The first leader of the Mu and the original Type Blue psion; seeks Jomy as successor and dies destroying the Meggido cannon. Voiced by: Taro Shigaki (1980), Tomokazu Sugita (2007 TV series).
- Tony (トニー, Tonī) – The first natural birth since the SD system; a rapidly growing, exceptionally powerful Type Blue who ultimately succeeds Jomy as Mu leader. Voiced by: Chiyoko Kawashima (1980), Eri Kitamura (2007 TV series).
- Physis (フィシス, Fishisu) – A blind tarot-reading seer revered by the Mu; an otherwise normal human granted psionic abilities by Blue. Voiced by: Kumiko Akiyoshi (1980), Sanae Kobayashi (2007 TV series).
- Jonah Matsuka (ジョナ・マツカ, Jona Matsuka) – A Mu who passes undetected and becomes fiercely loyal to Keith; dies saving him from an assassination attempt. Voiced by: Hiroko Yakushimaru (1980), Motoki Takagi (2007 TV series).
- Seki Ray Shiroe (セキ・レイ・シロエ, Seki Rei Shiroe) – A rebellious student on E-1077, unaware of his Mu powers, who constantly challenges Keith. Voiced by: Akira Kamiya (1980), Marina Inoue (2007 TV series).
- Harley (ハーレー, Hārē) – Commander of the Mu mothership Shangri-La; a Type Green with strong psionic defense. Voiced by: Keiichi Noda (1980), Juurouta Kosugi (2007 TV series).
- Sam Houston (サム・ヒューストン, Samu Hyūsuton) – Jomy's childhood friend who becomes close to Keith; later regresses mentally and dies of pneumonia. Voiced by: Hiroya Ishimaru (1980), Wataru Hatano (2007 TV series).
- Swena Dalton (スウェナ・ダールトン, Suwena Dāruton) – One of Jomy's childhood friends; assigned with Keith and Sam, and her daughter develops the Mu factor. Voiced by: Yuki Masuda (2007 TV series).
- Grandmother (グランドマザー, Gurandomazā) – The ruling computer of humanity, programmed to suppress the Mu and channel human hostility toward them.
- Computer Terra (コンピュータ・テラ (Konpyūta Tera) – A deep-Earth computer whose predictions about the Mu were rejected, leading to the creation of Grandmother.
- Mother Eliza (マザー・イライザ, Mazā Iraiza) – The "mother computer" of Educational Station E-1077 that favors Keith; later destroyed by him. Voiced by: Masako Ikeda (1980), Ai Orikasa (2007 TV series).
- Weeping Mouse (ナキ・ネズミ, Naki Nezumi) – A Mu-created, foxlike creature with limited telepathy; one specimen follows Jomy and is eventually named "Rain". Voiced by: Manami Komori (2007 TV series).

== Media ==
=== Manga ===
The manga series, written and illustrated by Keiko Takemiya, was serialized by Asahi Sonorama in Gekkan Manga Shōnen between January 1977 and May 1980. The chapters were collected in five bound volumes, which was reissued in August 1980 with the release of the movie. In 2007, on the day before the TV series began airing, the manga was reprinted by Japanese publisher Square Enix. In 2007, American publisher Vertical released the manga in three print volumes in North America under the title To Terra.... Manga Planet re-released the series digitally in 2019 under the title Toward the Terra. The series won two awards: the Seiun Award for best manga in 1978 and the Shogakukan Manga Award for best shōnen in 1979.

=== Movie ===
In 1980, Toward the Terra was adapted into an animated movie, produced by Toei Animation and directed by Hideo Onchi. Rightstuf released a hardsubbed version of the movie in North America. It was titled Toward the Terra, and appeared on VHS in 1994 and on laserdisc in 1995. At Anime Expo 2008, The Right Stuf International announced that its Nozomi Entertainment division had licensed the Toward the Terra film for the North American market.

=== TV series ===
Toward the Terra was adapted into an animated TV series in 2007, co-animated by Minamimachi Bugyōsho and Tokyo Kids, and produced by Aniplex, SKY Perfect Well Think and Mainichi Broadcasting System. It was directed by Osamu Yamazaki, written by Satoru Nishizono and featured character and conceptual designs by Nobuteru Yuki (Vision of Escaflowne) and Yutaka Izubuchi (RahXephon) respectively. The first opening theme, spanning episodes 1–13, was "Endscape", performed by the band UVERworld, while the first ending theme is "Love is", performed by Miliyah Kato. These were replaced from episodes 14–24 onwards, with the second opening theme being "Jet Boy Jet Girl", performed by Hitomi Takahashi, and the second ending theme being "This Night", performed by Chemistry.

The series premiered in Japan on MBS-TBS's Saturday 6:00 pm time slot on April 7, 2007. That time slot was previously occupied by other notable animated series, such as Mobile Suit Gundam Seed and Fullmetal Alchemist. It was replaced in this timeslot by Mobile Suit Gundam 00, which premiered in October 2007. The series was also aired in Japan on the BS network Animax, who also subsequently aired in its English language network in Southeast Asia and South Asia.

==== Episodes ====
No.	Title	Storyboard by	Written by	Original release date
1	"Day of Awakening" "Mezame no hi" (目覚めの日)	Osamu Yamasaki	Satoru Nishizono	April 7, 2007
At the human colony of Ataraxia, Jomy prepares to leave his parents' house and take the adulthood exam. However, just as Jomy's memories are about to be wiped by the mother computer, Soldier Blue interferes.
2	"Mu Ship" "Myū no fune" (ミュウの船)	Osamu Tsuruyama	Akemi Omode	April 14, 2007
Jomy reaches the Mu mother ship and learns of the true nature of the Mu. But the truth is too hard to handle for one who still believes himself to be human. Blaming the disruption of the adulthood exam on Soldier Blue, Jomy demands to be sent back.
3	"Ataraxia" "Atarakushia" (アタラクシア)	Osamu Tsuruyama	Akemi Omode	April 21, 2007
Still unwilling to face the truth, Jomy returns to Ataraxia with the help of Leo. However, only a cold house devoid of signs of life awaits him. Soon both Jomy and Leo are captured and interrogated.
4	"Return from Space" "Sora kara no kikan" (宙からの帰還)	Hidetoshi Yoshida	Miho Sakai	April 28, 2007
Having just awakened to his Mu powers, Jomy is going wild. As Soldier Blue goes out to help him, the Mu ship surfaces to draw away the human forces' attention. However, the battle does not look good.
5	"Leap of Death" "Shi no chōyaku" (死の跳躍)	Osamu Tsuruyama	Akemi Omode, Osamu Yamasaki	May 5, 2007
Jomy has come to terms with his powers and undergoes training to control them. But time is running out as Ataraxia's forces discover the location of the Mu ship. In a desperate move, the Mu warps the ship from the planet's surface and starts their long journey towards Terra.
6	"Station E-1077" "Sutēshon E-1077" (ステーションE-1077)	Osamu Tsuruyama	Akemi Omode, Osamu Yamasaki	May 12, 2007
At Educational Station E-1077, an academy for students who have passed the adulthood exam, Keith and Sam meet. When a transport ship collides with a military vessel in the docks and becomes isolated, Keith and Sam stage a rescue mission. However, with the station's mother computer preparing a purge of the affected region, they are running out of time.
7	"Rebellious Shiroe" "Hangyaku no Shiroe" (反逆のシロエ)	Hatano Kōhei	Toshizo Nemoto	May 19, 2007
Four years after Sam enters E-1077, Shiroe, a top student with a rebellious attitude, arrives at the station. Shiroe, who is the same child whom Jomy tried to save previously, tries his best to challenge Keith. His verbal provocations eventually lead to Keith hitting him. Meanwhile, Swena, tired of trying to win cold Keith's heart, decides to marry and leaves the station.
8	"Trembling Heart" "Furueru kokoro" (震える心)	Hidetoshi Yoshida	Toshizo Nemoto	May 26, 2007
Keith is troubled by his own nature and Shiroe's words, and questions Sam's statement that he is different from others after all. Shiroe, while investigating Keith's origins, uncovers the secret of Mother Ilaiza's genetic breeding program. Jomy, as the leader of the Mu telepathically broadcasts a diplomatic message causing everyone except Keith revert to child-like behavior.
9	"Unreaching Thought" "Todokanu omoi" (届かぬ思い)	Yūji Yanase	Toshizo Nemoto	June 2, 2007
Keith finds and shelters Shiroe, who is fleeing from a psychic exam. Shiroe is arrested while in Keith's care, but manages to stir doubts in Keith. The next day, much to Keith's surprise, everyone's memories of Shiroe and Jomy are erased. However, as Jomy attempts to communicate yet again, Shiroe flees the station and is shot down by Keith.
10	"Star of Escape" "Nogare no hoshi" (逃れの星)	Osamu Tsuruyama	Yutaka Izubuchi	June 9, 2007
Eight years after Shiroe is killed by Keith, the Mu are still drifting through space in search of Terra. Karina brings up the topic of natural childbirth in conversation with Jomy and her friends, and Jomy decides that this is the future path for the Mu. When the ship comes across an abandoned human outpost named Silvester 7 in the Silvester system, Jomy proposes to stay there, renaming the planet to Nazca. Meanwhile, Swena is investigating the existence of Moby Dick, the rumored space whale, as well as the events that took place on Station E-1077 eight years ago.
11	"Child of Nazca" "Nasuka no ko" (ナスカの子)	Osamu Tsuruyama	Hiroshi Ōnogi	June 16, 2007
The Mu have adapted to life on Nazca. The younger generation treat it as their home, but the elders are still bent on finding Terra. Karina gives birth to Tony, her and Yui's natural child. Meanwhile, Sam, brainwashed by the computers, arrives on Nazca and attempts to assassinate Jomy who survives but causing Sam to lose his memories and revert to child-like behavior. With all the recent events surrounding Nazca, Keith is sent out to investigate.
12	"The Lonesome Mu" "Kodoku Naru Myū" (孤独なるミュウ)	Ryoji Fujiwara	Dai Satō	June 23, 2007
Three years after settling on Nazca, Yui is killed in an accident. The old and the new generation are split more than ever about the future of Nazca and the quest to return to Terra, with the young Mu refusing to work on the ship. Meanwhile, Keith begins his journey to Silvester 7 to investigate the possible appearance of the Mu.
13	"What Hides On the Planet" "Hoshi ni Hisomu Mono" (星に潜むもの)	Kanyasaki Takaomi	Hiroshi Ōnogi	June 30, 2007
Jomy is optimistic about the future of the Mu on Nazca, but Physis feels the "winds of misfortune" coming to the planet. Keith arrives and is shot down, captured, and interrogated by the Mu while his inexperienced crew abandons him and runs away. To Physis' surprise, Keith has the same vision of Terra that she does, although they couldn't find out more due to his strong mental block.
14	"Identical Memories" "Onaji Kioku" (同じ記憶)	Risako Yoshida, Osamu Tsuruyama	Toshizo Nemoto	July 7, 2007
Jomy continues to interrogate Keith but ultimately fails. Tony attempts to take Keith's life using his power but Keith manages to throw a broken shard at Tony and immobilizes him. Meanwhile, Soldier Blue awakens from his long sleep while Matsuka flies to rescue Keith from capture. Episode ends with Keith meeting with Physis.
15	"Omen of Change" "Hendō no Yochō" (変動の予兆)	Yasuhiro Minami, Osamu Yamasaki	Shigeru Morita	July 14, 2007
Tony, along with Physis, is taken hostage by Keith. Karina goes berserk believing her son is dead and unleashes powers that damage sections of the ship. She is finally calmed by Jomy but in the end dies, due to her overexerting her powers. Keith uses the two hostages to slip by Soldier Blue and is taken home by Matsuka. Keith then contacts the military base and plans to return to eliminate the Mu.
16	"Red Eyes, Blue Planet" "Akai Hitomi, Aoi Hoshi" (赤い瞳 蒼い星)	Hideki Takayama	Hiroshi Ōnogi	July 21, 2007
Tony and other children on Nazca are suddenly in a state of hibernation now and the doctor is unable to bring them out of it. Keith assembles a crew and heads back to Nazca. A massive planetary scale weapon called the Meggido is introduced and the Members Elite plans to use this to eradicate the Mu's planet. The Meggido fires at Nazca and Soldier Blue teleports out of the ship to put up a powerful psion shield to stop it.
17	"Eternity and the Heat Haze" "Eien to Kagerō to" (永遠と陽炎と)	Jun Takada, Risako Yoshida	Hiroshi Ōnogi	July 28, 2007
Soldier Blue's shield isn't enough to stop the Meggido. Immediately, Soldier Shin (Jomy) and the seven other hibernating children teleports to the scene and reinforces the shield. The majority of the beam from the Meggido is deflected but a portion still manages to damage the planet and kill the Mu taking shelter there. Soldier Blue uses his last ounce of strength and destroys the Meggido while Jomy gathers other Mu and warps out in the Shangri-la. In that act, Soldier Blue dies and Jomy takes his place as the leader of the Mu. Jomy orders the Mu to return to Artemisia to destroy the system that controls humans and to liberate all that reside in it.
18	"Reunion on Artemisia" "Saikai no Arutemeshia" (再会のアルテメシア)	Risako Yoshida, Osamu Tsuruyama	Toshizo Nemoto	August 4, 2007
The seven blue-type children, including Tony, are now fully grown and are used as deadly weapons against the humans that get in the Mu's way. Due to their power and ruthless antics, the new blue-types are feared and a generation clash emerges. Jomy recognizes this but chooses to ignore it to reach the goal ahead, Artemisia. Keith, Swena and Sam are reunited and Swena hands over Shiroe's Peter Pan book. Inside the book Keith discovers a chip with a visual recording of his own birthplace. Keith decides to return to Educational Station E-1077 while Jomy and the Mu obliterate the humans' defenses and reach Artemisia.
19	"Respective places" "Sorezore no Basho" (それぞれの場所)	Hikaru Takanashi	Toshizo Nemoto	August 11, 2007
Keith and Physis discover the shocking truth that they both were artificially created through a process of genetic manipulation and a product of many failed experiments. It becomes evident that Physis is not a Mu, but an artificially created human given powers by Soldier Blue in the past. Jomy returns to the amusement park where he was supposed to have undergo his adulthood exam by Terras #5 and completely destroys Terras #5 this time. Keith puts Mother Iliza and Educational Station E-1077 on a self-destruct sequence and a new computer system called Grand Mother is reinstated. With Terras #5's computer system destroyed and the path to Terra cleared, Jomy decides to venture there along with the other Mu.
20	"The Night Before the Decisive Battle" "Kessen Zen'ya" (決戦前夜)	Osamu Tsuruyama	Shigeru Morita	August 18, 2007
With the help of Grand Mother, Keith quickly rises to become the leader of the human race and announces his plan to exterminate the Mu. A plan to ambush the Mu spaceship with a vast army before they reach Terra is immediately put in place.
21	"Stardust Memory" "Hoshikuzu no Kioku" (星屑の記憶)	Hikaru Takanashi	Shigeru Morita	September 1, 2007
On the way to Terra the Mu encounter a large human army near Jupiter. War and bloodshed ensues with lives lost on both sides. The human army is equipped with special spacecraft immune to the Mu's psionic powers and as a result three of the blue-type Mu are killed. Tony who was struck with grief unleashes a large psionic wave that pulverizes a large section of the human army. Keith then decides to use the Mu captured on Artemisia as hostages and this angers Tony even further.
22	"Fading Life" "Kureru Inochi" (暮れる命)	Hisashi Ishii	Toshizo Nemoto	September 8, 2007
Tony decides to take matters into his own hands and tries to assassinate Keith. He uses telekinesis to suffocate Keith but it ends prematurely when Matsuka jumps into the scene. Tony tries to deal the finishing blow but instead kills Matsuka who jumps to shield an unconscious Keith. At that moment, reinforcements arrive and Tony was forced to retreat.
23	"Toward Earth" "Chikyū e" (地球へ)	Kanyasaki Takaomi	Hiroshi Ōnogi	September 15, 2007
Due to Jomy's persuassion, Keith requests a meeting between the higher ups of both sides. Jomy and the Mu warp close to Earth only to find a planet that is completely ruined and does not support life. What was awaiting the Mu was an ambush consisting of 6 Meggido units ready to fire. The firing of the Meggido weapons were stopped by Keith himself who decides to have talks with the Mu. The humans and Mu argue and bicker in a conference until Keith offers to take Jomy to Grand Mother. They both go down towards the center of the planet where Grand Mother awaits.
24	"Terra's green hills" "Tera no Midori no Oka" (地球の緑の丘)	Rion Kujo	Hiroshi Ōnogi, Osamu Yamasaki	September 22, 2007
Swena broadcasts Keith's message to humanity about the truth behind Grand Mother's ideals. The final truth about the Mu genes is revealed: before the creation of SD system, scientists discovered the mutant Mu genes and arguments ensued as to whethere they were only a flick of mutation or the next phase of evolution. Unable to decide, the SD system was programmed to leave Mu genes intact in birth control process, only to carry out the extermination when the gene carrier reached adulthood; the purpose was to check whether they could survive the stress and became the next phase of evolution. As such, the Mu survived, confirming their superiority; the only problem being that the Grand Mother system has flawed programming and cannot accept the Mu. Keith broadcast this revelation for all humans to see, urging them to finally take over the decision and not relying on SD system any longer, while choosing to maintain the system for the sake of controlling human as a bet on human's future. Acknowledging Keith's decision, Grand Mother's programming moved to phase 4: eliminate Mu factor in birth progress, and order Keith to kill Jomy. Keith & Jomy decide to fight Grand Mother and are fatally wounded. Tony is chosen by Jomy to destroy the Meggidos pointed at Terra and to stand up as the next Soldier. Keith calls his subordinates to also destroy the Meggido units along with the Mu. The Meggido units are destroyed with the help of General Murdock who rams into it with his ship and Terra is saved from obliteration. Humans across the galaxy are shown rebelling against the SD system, and Tony steps up as the next leader of the Mu to bring humans and Mu together. The final scene after the credits shows a reborn Earth, as both the humans and Mu had hoped it would become. Two boys who resemble younger versions of Jomy and Keith meet each other for the first time, only to shed tears upon seeing each other, and not knowing why.

== Reception ==
The 2007 anime adaptation received mostly positive reviews from critics. Theron Martin of the Anime News Network gave the series several positive reviews concluding, "Toward the Terra is not a top-rate series, but it tells a good enough and engrossing enough, and acceptable enough, story to be worth a look. It never much more than toys with the serious underlying issues it touches upon, and has definite flaws elsewhere, but through this span of episodes it is still less shallow than most typical series".

In The Encyclopedia of Science Fiction, the show is described as warmly received by critics and fans. SFE notes that "It can be seen as a modern classic of post-2000s space-themed Anime, and a sincere revival of old-school Space Opera sensibilities, without the irony or genre deconstruction common in early twenty-first-century sf media. The anime has an ambitious narrative scope (spanning generations and multiple viewpoints) and the emotional intensity with which it explores themes of Evolution, Memory, and Identity – framing an ultimate choice between human empathy and authoritarian control – that remains compelling to this day. The anime can be seen as both a tribute to and a revival of the "great wave" of 1970s Japanese sf manga/anime: Takemiya was part of the Year 24 Group of female creators who revolutionized manga (in particular, shojo manga) with sf themes, and the anime adaptation of her award-winning manga demonstrates that even decades-old stories can find new life and relevance when animated with creativity and conviction".

== See also ==
- Slan, a 1946 novel with a similar premise and protagonist with the same first name
