= Natsu e no Tobira =

1975 Japanese manga and 1981 anime film

- Cover of the Anthology Book Natsu e no Tobira, featuring protagonist Marion

夏への扉
- Genre: Coming-of-age
- Manga
- Written by: Keiko Takemiya
- Published by: Hakusensha
- Magazine: Hana to Yume
- Published: October 1975
- Volumes: 1
- Anime film
- Directed by: Mori Masaki
- Produced by: Hiroki Akitsu
- Written by: Masaki Tsuji
- Music by: Kentarō Haneda
- Studio: Toei Animation; Madhouse
- Released: March 20, 1981
- Runtime: 59 minutes

Natsu e no Tobira (Japanese: 夏への扉; 'The Door into Summer') is a Japanese manga series written and illustrated by Keiko Takemiya. It is an early example of a shōnen-ai manga. It was originally serialized in Hana to Yume in 1975, published by Hakusensha, and it was re-released in 2000 by Kodansha. An animated film adaptation was released on March 20, 1981, in Japan.

== Manga ==
The original manga of Natsu e no Tobira is a short story, which first appeared in 19th and 20th issues of magazine Hana to Yume in October 1975. This work was contained in the anthology book of Keiko Takemiya, published in 1976. In 1981, a 60-minute anime movie adaptation was released in Japan.

The plot is a coming-of-age tragic romance involving five children in a French academy: a young boy, Marion, begins an affair with an older woman; his friend Ledania has unrequited feelings for him; their friend Claude is secretly deeply in love with Marion; friends Lind and Jacques develop a dangerous rivalry over their love for Ledania.

== Characters ==
Marion
A handsome, clever student of the certain school in France. He falls madly in love with the much older Sara, to whom he loses his virginity. He stays as her lover for some time, all the while knowing that the love would never be permanent due to Sara being married to Count Cluny. He rejects the affections of both Ledania and Claude because of his love for Sara. Claude ends up committing suicide over the rejection, something that Marion deeply regrets. When Sara finally breaks off their relationship, Marion is heartbroken, not just for Sara, but for the loss of Claude as well. He becomes gravely injured attempting to stop the duel between Lind and Jacques, and in the end is sent back to his family.
Jacques
Marion's friend and classmate. In contrast to his friends, Jacques is a simple boy from the countryside. He is stubborn yet optimistic. Jacques and Lind are good friends, however both are in love with Ledania, and their rivalry slowly turns bitter. In addition to Jacques' discovery that Lind is attempting to betray Marion, Jacques' rivalry with Lind culminates in a duel to the death. They only stop when Marion gets hurt attempting to stop them. At the end of the manga, Jacques is the only one to remain at the academy, and it appears Ledania has accepted his love. In the OVA ending, he still stays at the academy, but Ledania has not responded to his request to be in a relationship.
Lind
Marion's friend and classmate. He appears calm and collected, appearing the opposite of Jacques, but the two are good friends at first. He later turns out to be very cunning and envious, willing to hurt anyone over his love for Ledania. Lind and Jacques discover their mutual love for Ledania and become rivals from thereon. Upon discovering that Ledania is in love with Marion, Lind plans to double-cross Marion by telling the Count (Sara's husband) that Marion is having an affair with her, in hopes of getting Marion expelled from the academy and far away from Ledania. Jacques confronts him over this and, combined with their rivalry over Ledania, the situation escalates into a duel to the death. Marion gets hurt attempting to stop the two. After these events, Lind leaves the academy, transferring to a school in Paris.
Claude
Marion's friend and classmate. The quiet one of the group. He feels alone, and has been deeply in love with Marion, though he pretends to be in love with Ledania so his friends don't find out. During a drug-induced rage, he confesses his love and asks Marion to love him back. Marion does not reciprocate however, since he is in love with Sara. Claude also attempts to rape Marion, but eventually gives up altogether since Marion will not love him back. Heartbroken, Claude later commits suicide by slitting his wrists and throwing himself into a river.
Ledania
A beautiful young girl. Daughter of the mayor of the town. Many boys adore her. Shy and quiet, she is in love with Marion, though he has never had romantic interest in her. Ledania confesses her feelings to him, but is harshly rejected. She slaps him before crying and running away. At the end of the manga, she appears to have accepted the love of Jacques. In the OVA, she is too heartbroken over the events of the summer to give him an answer.
Sara
A beautiful older woman with dark hair and pale skin. Wife of Count Cluny. She begins an affair with Marion, being the one to take his virginity. However, the love is temporary for Sara, as she is only making love to Marion to fill an emptiness in her heart. She eventually ends the relationship with him, much to his sadness. In the end, Sara and the Count return to their home in Paris.
Le Comte de Cluny (Count Cluny)
A rich politician, and the husband of Sara. He appears to be aware of his wife's affair, but does not think much of it and never intervenes.
