= Sunroom Nite =

1970 manga by Keiko Takemiya

- Cover of Sunroom Nite in the Keiko Takemiya Collection e-book anthology series

サンルームにて (Sanrūmu Nite)
- Genre: Shōnen-ai
- Created by: Keiko Takemiya
- Manga
- Written by: Keiko Takemiya
- Published by: Shogakukan (magazine); Asahi Sonorama (book)
- Imprint: Sun Comics
- Magazine: Bessatsu Shōjo Comic
- Published: December 1970

Sunroom Nite (Japanese: サンルームにて, Hepburn: Sanrūmu Nite; transl. 'In the Sunroom') is a Japanese manga one-shot written and illustrated by Keiko Takemiya. It was originally published in the December 1970 issue of the manga magazine Bessatsu Shōjo Comic under the title Yuki to Hoshi to Tenshi to... (雪と星と天使と; transl. 'Snow and Stars and Angels and...'). It is the first work in the shōnen-ai genre, a genre of male-male romance manga aimed at a female audience.

The story is a loosely adapted and condensed version of Takemiya's later manga series Kaze to Ki no Uta, and follows the relationship between a Roma teenaged boy and the son of a wealthy family. Takemiya's publishers had declined to publish Kaze to Ki no Uta, owing to its homoerotic subject material and their refusal to publish stories focused on male protagonists. She was ultimately able to publish Sunroom Nite by submitting the story to her editor at Bessatsu Shōjo Comic immediately before the issue's publication deadline, thus foreclosing any attempts to edit or reject the story. Upon its publication, Sunroom Nite was a critical success; it is credited with establishing male–male romance as a discrete category of manga, and launching Takemiya's career as a manga artist in earnest.

== Plot ==
Serge Battour (セルジュ・バトール, Seruju Batōru), (Note: A character of the same name also appears as a primary character in Takemiya's later Kaze to Ki no Uta, though in that series, his surname is spelled in katakana as Batūru (バトゥール).) the teenaged son of a Roma fortuneteller, regularly visits an abandoned mansion to spend time in its sunroom. During one such visit he encounters Étoile Rael (エトアール・ライエル, Etoāru Raieru) and Angel Rael (エンジェル・ライエル, Enjeru Raieru), and learns they are respectively the son and daughter of a family that has recently taken up residence in the mansion. The siblings befriend Serge, and invite him to continue visiting the sunroom. Serge and Étoile gradually grow closer, though Étoile becomes deeply depressed and falls ill after Serge demurs from his romantic advances. Étoile's mother forbids the two from seeing each other, prompting Serge to infiltrate the mansion to visit him. Reunited, Étoile asks Serge to kiss him, which he obliges; Étoile then commits suicide by grabbing Serge's hand and using it to plunge a knife into his own stomach.

== Production ==
=== Context ===
Keiko Takemiya made her amateur debut as a manga artist in 1967, when her manga Kokonotsu no Yuujou (ここのつの友情) submitted to the magazine COM was published as a "Monthly Newcomer Honorable Mention", and made her professional debut in 1967 or 1968. (Note: Nakagawa 2020, p. 120 states that Takemiya made her professional debut in 1967 with Otōto (弟) published in the December 1967 issue of COM, while Ishida 2008 states that Takemiya made her debut with Ringo no Tobira (リンゴの扉) published in the supplemental New Years 1968 issue of Shūkan Margaret.) Having grown up reading shōnen manga (manga for boys), Takemiya was interested in creating manga that featured boys instead of girls, and especially "friendships" between boys. She had previously been introduced to literature, artwork, music, and films that depicted relationships between males by her friend Norie Masuyama, and was influenced by Taruho Inagaki's essay Shōnen-ai no Bigaku (少年愛の美学; "The Aesthetics of Boy Love", 1968) to make "shōnen-ai" (lit. 'boy love') the core of her creative work. (Note: While Inagaki's shōnen-ai referred to relations between adult males and adolescent boys, Takemiya's shōnen-ai refers to freely-associated romance between boys.)

The shōjo manga (girls' manga) publishing culture into which Takemiya made her debut was highly restrictive, and her editors at Shūkan Shōjo Comic refused to publish stories featuring male protagonists. Shōjo stories in general were marketed to an audience of children, were focused on uncomplicated subject material such as familial drama or romantic comedy, and favored Cinderella-like female protagonists defined by their passivity. Over the course of the 1970s, a new generation of shōjo artists would emerge who would introduce a greater degree of narrative and thematic complexity to the genre, collectively referred to as the Year 24 Group. (Note: The group was so named because its members were born in or around year 24 of the Shōwa era (or 1949 in the Gregorian calendar).) The group, of which Takemiya was a member, contributed significantly to the development of shōjo manga by expanding it to incorporate elements of science fiction, historical fiction, adventure fiction, and same-sex romance: both male–male (shōnen-ai and yaoi) and female–female (yuri).

In September 1970, Takemiya began drawing a manga tie-in for the television series Majoha Hottona Otoshi-goro in Shūkan Shōjo Comic, though she was unenthusiastic about the series because she found the material uninspiring. A one-shot (single chapter manga) adaptation had been publicly announced for publication in the December 1970 issue of the supplemental magazine Bessatsu Shōjo Comic, which Takemiya had little interest in writing. Masuyama suggested that she instead submit a shōnen-ai story, which Takemiya agreed to.

=== Development ===
By the early 1970s, Takemiya had already conceived of the plot and characters for what would become her acclaimed 1976 shōnen-ai series Kaze to Ki no Uta, but was unable to find a publisher for the series. Consequently, she sought to publish a "compact" version of Kaze to Ki no Uta in the form of Sunroom Nite. Knowing that a male–male romance story was likely to be heavily edited or rejected by her editors, Takemiya included the character of Angel, which gave the story the impression of a love triangle narrative. By having one of the central characters be a young girl, Sunroom Nite was able to "barely maintain the appearance of a shōjo manga", with Takemiya remarking that Angel's inclusion "made it easier to tell the story. If there were only two boys, there would be no way to tell the story."

Takemiya has described Sunroom Nite as the "foundation" of Kaze to Ki no Uta, with both works sharing common narrative and thematic elements. Both stories focus on a Roma teenager named Serge Battour, and his relationship with a blonde boy who dies at the end of the story; Serge and Étoile have been described as "prototypes" of Serge and Gilbert, the primary couple in Kaze to Ki no Uta. A character similar to Carl Maïsser, a secondary character in Kaze to Ki no Uta, also appears in Sunroom Nite.

Sunroom Nite contains nudity and scenes of male characters kissing each other, which was considered radical for shōjo manga of the time. The story begins and concludes with a monologue by Serge mourning Étoile, a narrative structure similar to that of Kaze to Ki no Uta. This narrative structure is also used in Takemiya's other shōnen-ai works, including Hohoemu Shōnen (ほほえむ少年) and 20 no Hiru to Yoru (20の昼と夜). Takemiya had rarely used this technique prior to Sunroom Nite; manga scholar Miki Ishida suggests that Takemiya's depiction of the inner lives of her characters evolved along with her development of the theme of shōnen-ai.

=== Release ===
"[The editors] were very angry. But fortunately, it was not rejected. The editorial department did not have a convenient alternative manuscript. They wanted me to redraw it, but there was no time. I think my credibility was seriously damaged, but it was a winning strategy."

– Keiko Takemiya (Note: Quoted in Japanese: 「すごく怒っていた。だが、幸運なことにボツにはならなかった。編集部に都合の良い代わりの原稿がなかったのだ。私に描き直させたくても、時間がない。私の信用はずいぶん落ちたと思うが、作戦勝ちだった」)

Takemiya submitted a manuscript of the finished manga under the same title as the previously announced one-shot, but with completely different content, immediately before the publication deadline for Bessatsu Shōjo Comic. Her editor Junya Yamamoto called Takemiya to the Shogakukan offices, where he expressed anger that the content was different from what had been discussed, but ultimately permitted the manga to be published as-is because there was no time to revise it. Takemiya stated in her 2019 memoir that this was the first and last time she changed the content of her manga without consulting the editor.

The 50-page one-shot was published under the title Yuki to Hoshi to Tenshi to... in the December 1970 issue of Bessatsu Shōjo Comic. In all subsequent releases, it has been published under the title Sunroom Nite. As shōnen-ai did not yet exist as a category of manga, the story was marketed as "a manga with bishōnen as the main characters"; manga featuring bishōnen (literally 'beautiful boys') as central characters were rare in female-centric shōjo manga of the era. In 1976, Asahi Sonorama published an anthology of short stories by Takemiya titled Sunroom Nite under its Sun Comics imprint, which contains the titular one-shot manga. In 1978, Chikuma Shobō also published an anthology containing Sunroom Nite, as part of its Keiko Takemiya Collection in the short-lived Gendai Manga Zenshū (現代まんが全集, 'Complete Collection of Modern Manga') series. (Note: Chikuma Shobō's Gendai Manga Zenshū series ceased publication after the release of its first Takemiya volume in July 1978. Chikuma Shobō filed for bankruptcy in summer 1978.) The one-shot was similarly included in anthologies of Takemiya's manga published by Kadokawa Shoten in 1990 and Media Factory in 2002. In 2010, eBook Initiative Japan released an e-book anthology titled Sunroom Nite, featuring the titular one-shot and five other short stories by Takemiya from the early 1970s. The e-book was the third of fifteen short story volumes released as part of the company's digital Keiko Takemiya Collection.

== Reception ==
=== Critical reaction ===
Takemiya stated that she expected a public backlash for Sunroom Nite, but that she received many supportive letters from readers, and the story was favorably assessed in a reader survey organized by the magazine. In their analysis, Ishida attributes the positive reader response to interest in the new theme of shōnen-ai, as well as the quality of the story itself, including its focus on the internal conflicts of the characters. The positive reader response led several of Takemiya's shōnen-ai one-shots to be published by Shogakukan, including Hohoemu Shōnen in the August 1972 issue of Bessatsu Shōjo Comic, 20 no Hi to Yoru in the August 1973 issue of Bessatsu Shōjo Comic, and Sutā! (スター！) in the supplemental summer 1974 issue of Shūkan Shōjo Comic.

After the publication of Sunroom Nite, Takemiya says that was separately contacted by manga artists Jun Morita and Ryoko Yamagishi through the editorial department at Shogakukan, both of whom had read the story. Yamagishi told Takemiya that she too was interested in drawing a shōnen-ai manga, but that her editors at Shueisha only permitted her to draw conventional shōjo manga.

=== Legacy ===
"I think I was able to show the possibility of boys talking about love with each other in [Sunroom Nite]. The girls who read it responded so well to it that I wondered why there was such a strong reaction to it, unlike other works. I thought that it is girls who can make a 'story that is incomprehensible' to men into a 'story that is possible'."

– Keiko Takemiya (Note: Quoted in Japanese: 「この作品で少年同士が愛を語る可能性を示すことができ たのではないかと思います。読 者の少女たちからは、なぜ他の作品と違ってこんなにも反応があるのだろうというくらい、手応えがあった。男性からしたら「訳が分からん話」が「あり得る話」になるのは、やっぱり女の子だな、と思いました。」)

Sunroom Nite was the first work of shōjo to depict romance between male characters, and became the first work in the genre that would become known as shōnen-ai. (Note: It was not the first shōjo manga to depict homosexuality generally, a distinction that belongs to the 1969 manga series Fire! by Hideko Mizuno.) As the genre of shōnen-ai did not exist upon its original release, the series was positioned as a shōjo manga featuring a bishōnen (lit. "beautiful boys", a term for androgynous male characters), which was unusual for shōjo manga at the time. Sunroom Nite played a significant role in establishing male–male romance as a discrete category of manga, and became a precursor to the modern genres of yaoi and boys' love (BL). Ishida similarly evaluates the series as an influential work that served as a starting point for manga about romance and sex between men created by women for a female audience. The positive critical recognition that Sunroom Nite received is credited with launching Takemiya's career as a manga artist in earnest.
