= Nagai =

Nagai may refer to:

- Nagai (surname), a Japanese surname
- Nagai, Yamagata, a city in Yamagata Prefecture, Japan
- An alternative name for Nagapattinam district, Tamil Nadu, India
- Nagai (Star Wars), a fictional alien race in the Star Wars franchise

== People with the given name ==
- Nagai Sriram, Indian musician and Carnatic violinist
