= Kyoko Mizuki =

Japanese manga artist

- Born: November 28, 1949 (age 76); Tokyo, Japan
- Occupations: Novelist, manga writer, poet, essayist, lyricist
- Writing career
- Pen name: Keiko Nagita (名木田 恵子 Nagita Keiko), Ayako Kazu (加津 綾子 Kazu Ayako), Akane Kouda (香田 あかね Kouda Akane), Kyoko Mizuki (水木 杏子 Mizuki Kyōko)
- Period: 1968–present
- Genres: Romance, fantasy, juvenile
- Notable works: Candy Candy (1975); Rainette, Kin Iro no Ringo (2006)

Kyoko Mizuki (水木 杏子, Mizuki Kyōko) is one of the pen names of Keiko Nagita (名木田 恵子, Nagita Keiko; born November 28, 1949), a Japanese writer who is best known for being the author of the manga and anime series Candy Candy.

Kyoko Mizuki won the Kodansha Manga Award for Best Shōjo Manga for Candy Candy in 1977 with Yumiko Igarashi.

Keiko Nagita won the Japan Juvenile Writers Association Prize for Rainette, Kin Iro no Ringo (Rainette - The Golden Apples) in 2007.

Her short story Akai Mi Haziketa is printed in Japanese Primary School Textbook for 6th grade (Mitsumura Tosho Publishing Co., Ltd.).

Her picture book Shampoo Ōji series (art by Makoto Kubota) was adapted into an anime television series in October 2007.

== Biography ==
When she was 12 years old, her father died. Then she created "imaginary family Andrews" to relieve her loneliness and wrote their stories on a notebook. Mizuki said: "I feel Andrews family have watched me affectionately. They are the origin of my story writing".

She spent a few years as an actress of Shiki Theatre Company in her late teens, and some of her works reflect this.

In eleventh-grade, she won a prize short story contest for young girls' magazine Jogakusei no Tomo. After selling her short story Yomigaeri, Soshite Natsu wa to the magazine when she was 19 years old, she decided to become a full-time writer.

In those days she was a frequent contributor of poems to Koukou Bungei magazine, famous poet Katsumi Sugawara appreciated her talent and she joined his poetry club. When she was 20, she published a collection of poems Kaeru privately. Five years later, her poetical works Omoide wa Utawanai was published by Sanrio Company, Ltd.

She wrote short stories and love stories for young girls' magazines, and Kodansha commissioned her to write stories for their shōjo manga magazine Shōjo Friend. In the 1970s, she wrote many shōjo manga stories as Ayako Kazu, Akane Kouda, Kyoko Mizuki and Keiko Nagita.

In 1975, she wrote the story of freckled hearty girl, Candy Candy for monthly Nakayoshi.

In her twenties, she wrote the first story for a manga at the request of Mr. Higashiura, then the chief editor of Bessatsu Shōjo Friend. She wrote many shōjo manga stories for mainly Friend and Nakayoshi in 1970s. Then, Mr. Higashiura, who took up the post of the chief editor of Monthly Nakayoshi, drew up a project that a shōjo manga like a famous stories retold for children as Heidi.

She said:

"I lost my mother when I was 21, then I was all alone in the world. To write the story healed my sorrow"; "Before I wrote the story of Candy, one of what some decided was "Who is her mother is not the theme". Whoever are your parents, you must accept your destiny and stand on your own feet---I wanted to say so. When I started to write the story, it was two years after my mother passed away. My father passed away at my 12th year, I lived in solitude because I am the only child of them. Looking back on my years of writing Candy story, I realize that I healed my pain by writing".

(quote: "Interviews with Manga Authors" by Itou Ayako, Doubun Shoin inc.).

The manga was adapted into anime television series in 1976 by Toei Animation. Since then Candy Candy has made her one of the more successful female manga writers.

The last episode of Candy Candy was written at Domaine De Beauvois, a chateau-hotel in France. Mizuki said: "I wanted to say good-bye to Candice in beautiful place. If possible, I wanted to go to the United Kingdom When I was into the room, tears welled up in my eyes because a picture of fox hunting was hung on the wall. Fox hunting--it took Anthony's life. When I remember Candice, autumn days at the beautiful hotel came to my mind. The hotel was like the villa of Ardray family".

Since 1980, she is mainly writing juveniles and love stories for young girls as Keiko Nagita. Her Fūko to Yūrei series is especially popular. Music for Fūko to Yūrei series was composed by Toru Okada (岡田 徹, Okada Toru; born April 23, 1949 in Tokyo) who is a member of Japanese famous rock group Moonriders, the album called Siriau Maekara Zutto Suki 知りあう前からずっと好き was released in 1995.

In 2001, she returned to publishing with the concluding part of Fūko to Yūrei.

She won the Japan Juvenile Writers Association Prize 2007 for Rainette, Kin Iro no Ringo, a love story of a Japanese girl and a Belarusian boy who was exposed to radiation of Chernobyl Nuclear Power Plant.

In May 2008, she wrote a story for Shōjo manga after an interval of 18 years. The manga Loreley was drawn by Kaya Tachibana.

She has a husband and a daughter, and they enjoy vacation at their cottage in Prince Edward Island every summer. Terry Kamikawa, a student of Anne of Green Gables and hostess of Blue Winds Tea Room in P.E.I, is her best friend.

She has a collection of heart shaped objects. Part of her collection is shown on the Aoitori Bunko official site.

== Selected bibliography ==
=== Manga ===
- Sanremo ni Kanpai (as Keiko Nagita, art by Waki Yamato), 1970
- Brandenburg no Asa (as Keiko Nagita, art by Waki Yamato), 1970
- Le Grand Anne Gou wa Yuku (as Keiko Nagita, art by Waki Yamato), 1970
- Greenhill Monogatari (as Keiko Nagita, art by Yasuko Aoike), 1970–1971
- Lorient no Aoi Sora (as Keiko Nagita, art by Yoko Shima), 1974–1975
- Candy Candy (as Kyoko Mizuki, art by Yumiko Igarashi), 1975–1979
- Etruria no Ken (as Keiko Nagita, art by Kyoko Fumizuki), 1975
- Miriam Blue no Mizuumi (as Keiko Nagita, art by Yasuko Aoike), 1975
- Hoshi eno Kaidan (as Akane Kouda, art by Akemi Matsuzaki), 1975
- Byakuya no Nightingale (as Keiko Nagita, art by Yoko Shima), 1976–1977
- Bara no Ki (as Kyoko Mizuki, art by Chikako Kikukawa), 1978
- Premier Muguet (as Kyoko Mizuki, art by Yōko Hanabusa), 1979–1981
- Kirara Boshi no Daiyogen (as Kyoko Mizuki, art by Yū Asagiri), 1980–1981
- Sunday's Child (as Kyoko Mizuki, art by Tsubasa Nunoura), 1980–1981
- Tim Tim Circus (as Kyoko Mizuki, art by Yumiko Igarashi), 1981–1982
- Loreley (as Kyoko Mizuki, art by Kaya Tachibana), 2008

=== Novels ===
As Keiko Nagita

- Candy Candy, 1978
- Umi ni Otiru Yuki, 1980
- Night Game, 1985
- Moonlight Express, 1986
- Fūko to Yūrei series (art by Yumi Kayama), 1988–2002
- Umizikan no Marin, 1992
- Akai Mi Haziketa, 1999
- Hoshi no Kakera, 2000–2001
- Tenshi no Hashigo, 2002–2003
- Koppu no Naka no Yuuzora, 2004–2005
- air, 2003
- Rainette, Kin Iro no Ringo, 2006
- Ballerina Jikenbo series, 2006–2008
- Birthday Club series (art by Yu Azuki), 2006–

=== Poems ===
As Keiko Nagita

- Kaeru, 1969
- Omoide wa Utawanai, 1974
- Otanjoubi ni (art by Yoko Sano), 1975
- Fifty, 2004

=== Essays ===
As Keiko Nagita

- Mouitido Utatte, 1978
- Nagita Keiko Hitoritabi, 1980
- Anne no Shima, Kazedayori, 1993, collaboration with Terry Kamikawa
- Islander Monogatari, Anne no Sima no Hitobito, 1997

=== Picture books ===
As Keiko Nagita

- kodansha Ohimesama Ehon4 Ningyohime (art by Macoto Takahashi), 1971
- Nemutai Kirin (art by Keiji Nakamura), 1979
- Monmonku wa Yasasii (art by Makoto Obo), 1979
- Shampoo Ōji no Bouken (art by Makoto Kubota), 2004
- Shampoo Ōji to Kitanai Kotoba (art by Makoto Kubota), 2005
- Shampoo Ōji to Daiakutou (art by Makoto Kubota), 2006

=== Lyrics ===
As Keiko Nagita

- Candy Candy (composition: Takeo Watanabe, performance: Mitsuko Horie)
- Ashita ga Suki (composition: Takeo Watanabe, performance: Mitsuko Horie)
- Futari kiri no Lullaby (composition: Juichi Sase, performance: Ruo Megimi)
- Tazunebito futagoza (composition: Juichi Sase, performance: Ruo Megimi)
- Ame no Suizokukan (composition: Satsuya Iwasawa, performance: Ruo Megimi)
- Shabondama Love (composition: Masami Koizumi, performance: Ruo Megimi)
- Shiriau Maekara Zutto Suki (composition: Toru Okada, performance: Yoko Ishida)
- Shizuku wa Anata no Sign (composition: Toru Okada, performance: Mitsuko Horie)
- Uwasa Shitteruwa (composition and performance: Miyuki Yokoyama)
- Shampoo Ōji no Bouken (composition: Hironobu Kageyama, performance: Ikuko)
- Shampoo Ōji no Komoriuta (composition: Hironobu Kageyama, performance: Mayu Miyauchi)
