= Izawa =

Izawa is a Japanese surname. Notable people with the surname include:

- Atsushi Izawa (born 1989), Japanese footballer who plays for Ventforet Kofu
- Hiroshi Izawa (born 1955), Japanese actor, voice actor, and director
- Takushi Izawa (born 1994), Japanese TV personality, quiz player, YouTuber and entrepreneur
- Kyoko Izawa (born 1962), Japanese politician of the Liberal Democratic Party, a member of the House of Representatives in the Diet
- Mann Izawa (born 1945), Japanese manga writer mostly known for his popular manga and anime series Lady Georgie
- Takio Izawa (1869–1949), Japanese politician of the early 20th century
- Takuya Izawa (born 1984), Japanese racing driver
- Toshimitsu Izawa (born 1968), Japanese professional golfer
