= Moritani =

Moritani (written: 森谷 or 守谷) is a Japanese surname. Notable people with the surname include:

- Kaori Moritani (守谷 香, born 1969), Japanese singer
- Shirō Moritani (森谷 司郎, 1931–1984), Japanese film director and screenwriter

== See also ==
- Mauritania, called Moritani in the Pulaar language
