= Kaoru Kurimoto =

Japanese novelist (1953–2009)

- Born: Sumiyo Yamada; February 13, 1953; Katsushika-ku, Tokyo, Japan
- Died: May 26, 2009 (aged 56); Tokyo, Japan
- Occupations: novelist, composer and critic
- Spouse(s): Kiyoshi Imaoka, former editor of SF Magazine, now president of Tenro Productions

Kaoru Kurimoto (栗本 薫, Kurimoto Kaoru; February 13, 1953 – May 26, 2009) was the pen name of Sumiyo Imaoka (今岡 純代, Imaoka Sumiyo), a Japanese novelist. Imaoka also used the pen name Azusa Nakajima (中島 梓, Nakajima Azusa) to write criticism and music. She was known for her record-breaking 130-volume Guin Saga series, which has been translated into English, German, French, Italian and Russian. Her style has been described as being part of the New Wave science fiction movement. Outside of her literary endeavors, she was a playwright, composer, and pianist who performed with her own jazz ensemble, the Azusa Nakajima Trio.

== Biography ==
Kurimoto was born in Tokyo and studied literature at Waseda University, graduating in 1975. Still in her twenties, she won the Gunzo Prize for New Writers (Criticism), as Azusa Nakajima, in 1977, and the Edogawa Rampo Prize in 1978 for "Our Era". This spectacular introduction to the literary world drew a lot of attention, especially as she was the youngest ever winner of the Edogawa Rampo Prize. Her use of two pen names was also discussed, and shortly after she won the Rampo prize, Heibon Panchi magazine featured a conversation between the "two" writers.

Kurimoto is known for having written nearly 400 books since she began her career. She wrote in several genres, including science fiction, fantasy, horror, mystery, yaoi and Japanese-style historical romance.

Her writing shows the influence of Mori Mari, with a number of her works featuring homosexual love, and her 1979 novel, Mayonaka no Tenshi (真夜中の天使; Midnight Angel) played an important part in the creation of the shonen-ai/yaoi genres, "pioneering interest" in them before they became widely popular. She has also supported yaoi in her work as Nakajima. She was also heavily involved with the first issue of the yaoi magazine June in 1978, contributing stories and criticism as Kaoru Kurimoto and Azusa Nakajima, as well as using a number of other pseudonyms.

She died on May 26, 2009, aged 56, in a Tokyo hospital, from pancreatic cancer, which was diagnosed in 2007. She had been writing the 130th volume of the Guin Saga up until May 23, 2009. Kurimoto was given a special award posthumously by the Science Fiction and Fantasy Writers of Japan association.

== Works ==
=== As Azusa Nakajima ===
- The outlines of literature 文学の輪郭 Bungaku no rinkaku - won the Gunzo Prize for New Writers with this work in 1977.
- Nakajima, Azusa. 1987. Introduction to the theory of Bishōnen 美少年学入門 Bishōnen gaku nyūmon. Tōkyō: Shūeisha
- Nakajima, Azusa. 2005. Tanatosu no kodomo tachi – Kajōtekiō no seitaigaku. Tōkyō: Chikuma

Shobō.

=== As Kaoru Kurimoto ===
- Bokura no Jidai (ぼくらの時代; debut novel, 1978)
- Mayonaka no Tenshi (真夜中の天使, 1979)
- Guin Saga, 1979 to 2009 (her death) - a "heroic fantasy" epic about a warrior cursed with a leopard head mask.
- Makai Suikoden 魔界水滸伝 - 'makai' means 'demon world' and 'Suikoden' is the Japanese title of The Water Margin, a Chinese classical novel. This novels regarded as an important work in the Japanese Cthulhu Mythos, tells the story of a war between the Elder Gods and Japanese gods. It is partially based on The Water Margin.
- Makyou Yuugeki Tai - a work bridging the Guin Saga and the Cthulhu Mythos, with a male protagonist named after the author.
- The Sword of Paros, a 1986 manga illustrated by Yumiko Igarashi.
