= Ikuko =

- Gender: Female

Origin
- Origin: Japanese
- Meaning: Different meanings depending on the kanji used

Ikuko (written: 郁子 or 育子) is a feminine Japanese given name. Notable people with the name include:

- Ikuko Ishii ((石井 郁子); born 1940), Japanese politician
- Ikuko Itoh ((伊藤 郁子)), Japanese character designer and animation director
- Ikuko Kawai ((川井 郁子), born 1968), Japanese classical violinist and composer
- Ikuko Nagai (永井 郁子, 1893–1983), Japanese soprano
- Ikuko Okamura ((岡村 育子); born 1976), Japanese field hockey player
- Ikuko Kitamori (北森 郁子); born 1963), Japanese discus thrower
- Ikuko Tani (谷 育子, born 1939), Japanese actress, voice actress and narrator
- Ikuko Yoda (依田 郁子; 1938–1983), Japanese sprinter
- Ikuko Tsukino (月野育子), fictional character in Sailor Moon
