= Shino Kakinuma =

Japanese voice actress (born 1965)

- 柿沼 紫乃
- Born: October 27, 1965 (age 61); Setagaya, Tokyo, Japan
- Occupation: Voice actress
- Years active: 1980–present
- Agent: Aoni Production
- Spouse: Toshio Furukawa (m. 1991)
- Website: www.topio.jp/shino-top.htm

Shino Kakinuma (柿沼 紫乃, Kakinuma Shino; born October 27, 1965) is a Japanese voice actress from Tokyo.

She is best known for her voice roles as Naru Osaka in Sailor Moon and Suzuko in the 1980s remake of Sally the Witch. She also voiced Videl in Dragon Ball Kai while the character's original voice actress, Yūko Minaguchi, was on hiatus.

Kakinuma is married to fellow voice actor Toshio Furukawa and is affiliated with Aoni Production.

== Filmography ==
=== Anime television ===
- Dream 9 Toriko & One Piece & Dragon Ball Z Chō Collaboration Special!! (Videl)
- GeGeGe no Kitarō 1985 series
- GeGeGe no Kitarō 1996 series
- Goldfish Warning! (Chieiko (ep. 15))
- Hello! Lady Lynn (Peggy)
- Kemonozume (Rie Kakinoki)
- Lady Lady!! (Jill)
- Sailor Moon (Naru Osaka)
- Sailor Moon Crystal (Keiko Tomoe)
- Dragon Ball Kai (Videl, Pan)
- Fight! Kickers (Shinsuke Koga)
- Mama wa Shōgaku 4 Nensei (Kiyoko Takashimaya)
- Shōnen Santa no Daibôken (Luweny (ep. 24), Twenty)
- Sally the Witch 2 (Suzuko)
- Sorcerer Hunters (girl (ep. 13))
- Urusei Yatsura

=== OVAs ===
- Be-Bop High School (Satomi)
- Down Load - Namiamidabutsu wa Ai no Uta (Yoko)
- End of the World (Kazumi)
- Karura Mau (Setsuko)
- Legend of the Galactic Heroes
- Shōnan Bakusōzoku (Announcer (ep. 3), Vice President (ep. 7))

=== Video games ===
- Yaiba: Ninja Gaiden Z (Momiji)

=== Minor roles ===
- Shadowverse: Worlds Beyond (Fledgling Dragonslayer)
