= Muka Muka Paradise =

Japanese manga series

ムカムカパラダイス
- Genre: Adventure, Fantasy
- Manga
- Written by: Fumiko Shiba
- Illustrated by: Yumiko Igarashi
- Published by: Shogakukan
- Magazine: Ciao
- Original run: March 1993 – September 1994
- Volumes: 3
- Anime television series
- Directed by: Katsuyoshi Yatabe
- Music by: Nobuyuki Nakamura
- Studio: Nippon Animation
- Original network: JNN (MBS)
- Original run: September 4, 1993 – August 27, 1994
- Episodes: 51

Muka Muka Paradise (Japanese: ムカムカパラダイス) is a manga series by Yumiko Igarashi and Fumiko Shiba, serialized between March 1993 and September 1994 in Shogakukan's Ciao magazine. It was later adapted into a 51 episode anime that aired in Japan between September 4, 1993, and August 27, 1994. The story revolves around a young girl named Uiba Shikatani and her newly found pet dinosaur, which is named after the only words that come out of its mouth, Muka Muka.

== Characters ==
Muka Muka (ムカムカ)
Voiced by: Chika Sakamoto
Muka Muka is Uiba's newly hatched pet dinosaur.
Uiba Shikatani (鹿谷初葉, Shikatani Uiba)
Voiced by: Kumiko Watanabe
Uiba Shikatani is the daughter of a pet shop owner.
Hazuki Shiberia (志歴屋葉月, Shiberia Hazuki)
Voiced by: Rica Matsumoto
One of Uiba's childhood friends and the daughter of a dry goods store. She is a first-year junior high school student who is older than Uiba. She is called the Moon Sister by Uiba and the others. She is active and strong in fights, and she avenges Kawata, who always challenges her.

== Volumes ==
1. ISBN 4-09-134841-6 published in September 1993.
2. ISBN 4-09-134842-4 published in March 1994.
3. ISBN 4-09-134843-2 published in October 1994.
