= Yumiko Igarashi =

Japanese manga artist

Yumiko Igarashi いがらしゆみこ
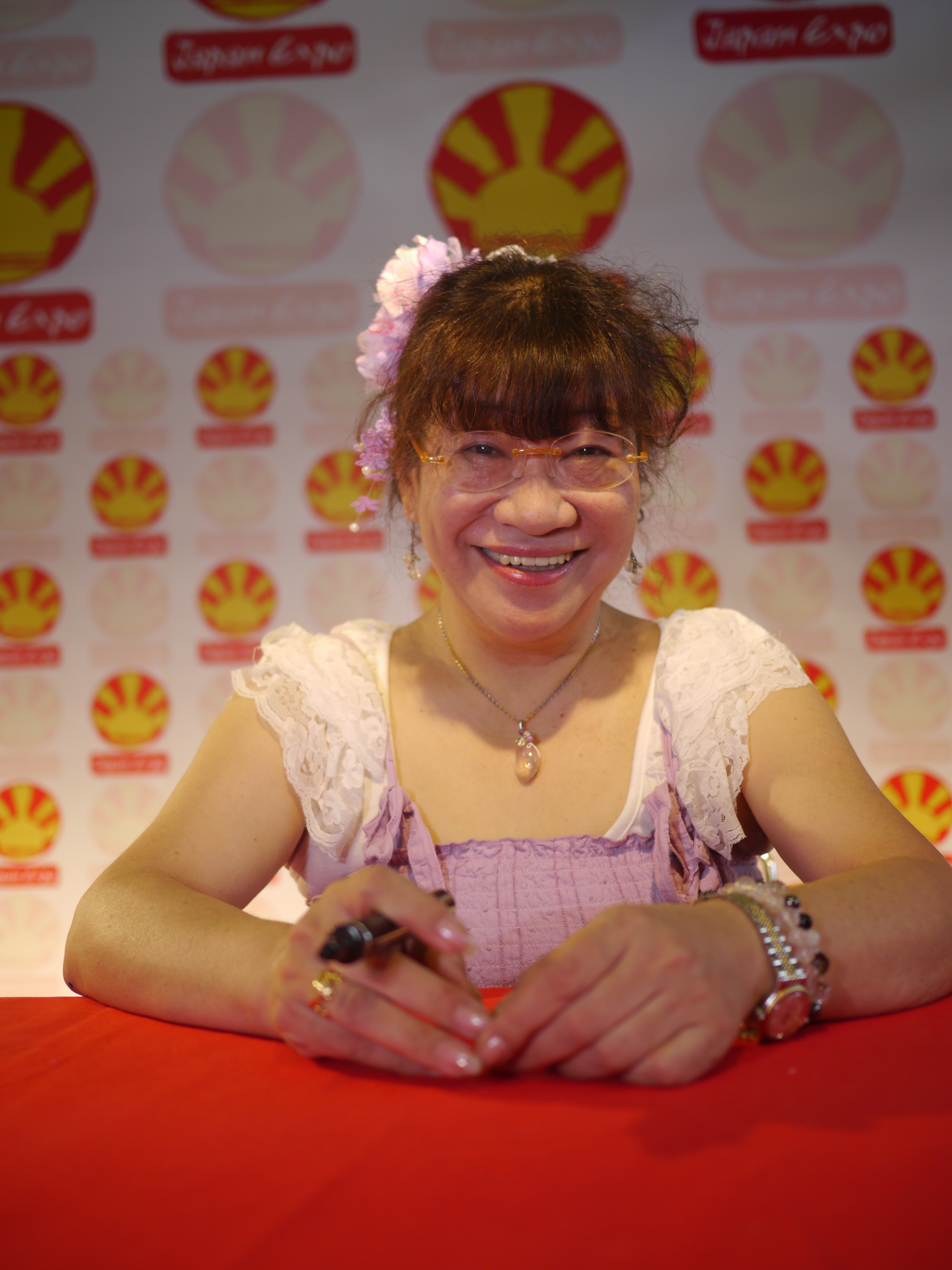
- Igarashi at Japan Expo 2011 in France
- Born: Izumi Aso; 26 August 1950 (age 76) Asahikawa, Japan
- Area: Manga artist
- Notable works: Candy Candy (artist); Georgie! (artist)
- Awards: 1977 Kodansha Manga Award

Yumiko Igarashi (いがらし ゆみこ, Igarashi Yumiko; born 26 August 1950 in Asahikawa, Hokkaido) is a Japanese manga artist. She is best known for illustrating the manga series Candy Candy.

== Career ==
In 1968, as a third-year high school student at the Asahi Gaoka High School in Sapporo, Hokkaido, Igarashi made her debut in Shueisha's Ribon manga magazine with Shiroi Same no iru Shima. She won the 1st Kodansha Manga Award in 1977 as the artist of Candy Candy.

In the late 1990s, Igarashi became involved in a number of legal battles related to her intellectual property rights as an illustrator. Igarashi claimed that in series for which she was the illustrator, she should hold sole intellectual property rights to the portrayals of the characters, and not need the consent of her authors to license merchandise based on their likenesses. In a dispute over the Candy Candy character designs in 1999, the court ruled against Igarashi, stating that both she and writer Kyoko Mizuki held equal rights to the characters, and awarded Mizuki reparations equal to 3% royalties on all the merchandise that had been created without her consent. This legal battle paralyzed the franchise for several years, interfering with Toei's production of a Candy Candy anime, and making the creation of new merchandise difficult due to the court's order that all merchandise be approved by both Igarashi and Mizuki. A trickle of new merchandise was produced in 2004, suggesting some agreement had been reached.

== Personal life ==
Igarashi is a resident of Sapporo, Hokkaido. Satsuki Igarashi, a member of the manga circle Clamp, is her cousin.

Igarashi married voice actor Kazuhiko Inoue and they later divorced. They have a son named Keiichi Igarashi (born 1981), known professionally as Nanami Igarashi, who is a former idol-trainee at Johnny & Associates and published a comic essay about his experiences as an otokonoko in 2010.

== Works ==
- 1968: Shiroi Same no iru Shima (debut)
- 1975: Candy Candy (story by Kyoko Mizuki)
- 1979: Mayme Angel (story and art by Igarashi)
- 1981: Swan Lake (character design by Igarashi)
- 1982: Koronde Pokkle (story and art by Igarashi)
- 1982: Georgie! (story by Mann Izawa)
- 1986: The Sword of Paros (story by Kaoru Kurimoto)
- 1993–1994: Muka Muka Paradise (story by Fumiko Shiba)
- 1997: Anne of Green Gables (story and art by Igarashi, adapted from Lucy Maud Montgomery's novel)
- 1998: Anne of Avonlea (story and art by Igarashi, adapted from Lucy Maud Montgomery's novel)
- 1998: Anne of the Island (story and art by Igarashi, adapted from Lucy Maud Montgomery's novel)
- 2011–2014: Josephine the French Rose (story by Kaoru Ochiai)
