= Yōko Hanabusa =

Japanese manga artist

Yōko Hanabusa 英 洋子
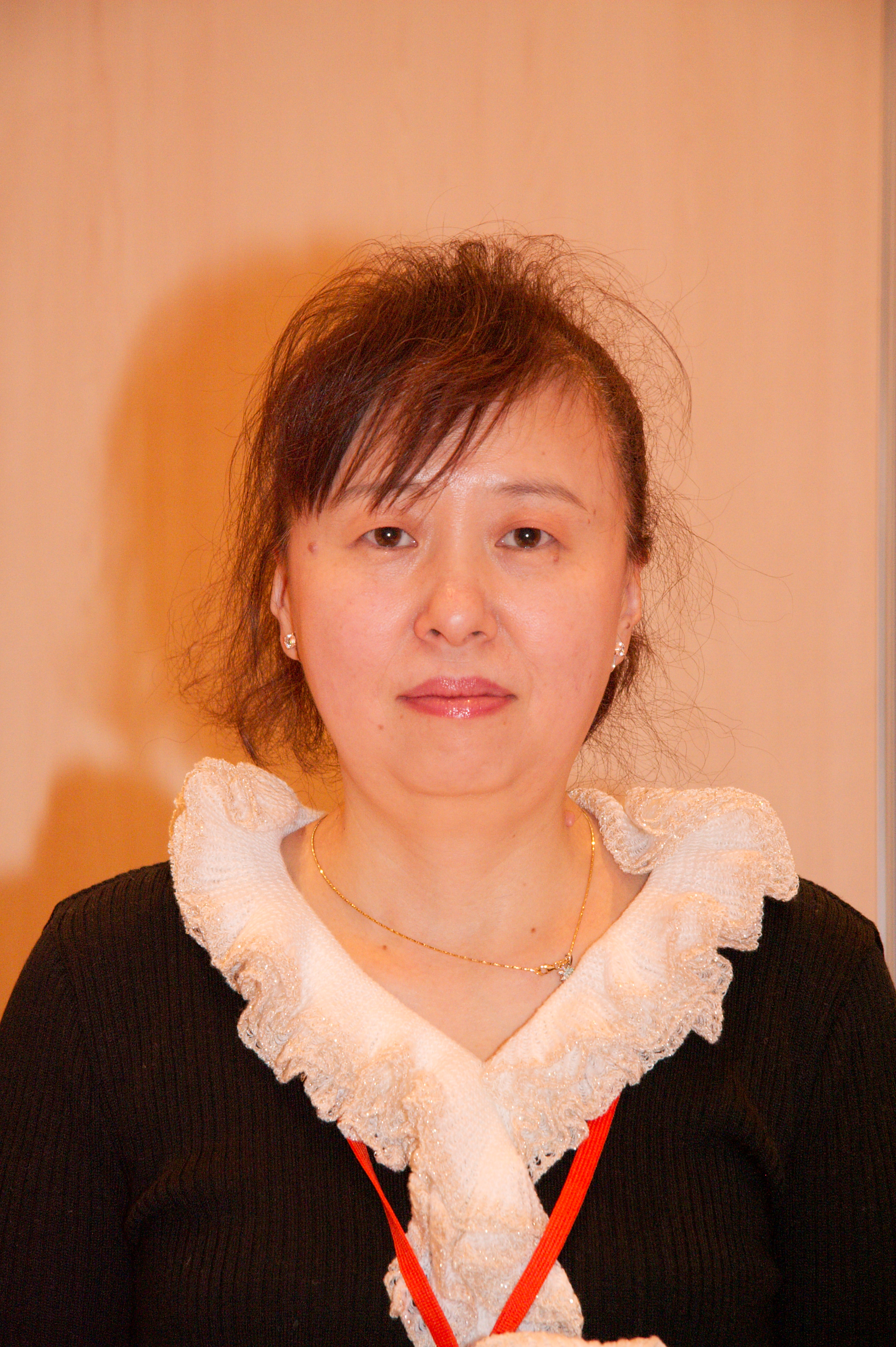
- Born: Hanabusa, Yōko Suginami, Tokyo, Japan
- Areas: Writer, Penciller, Inker
- Notable works: Lady!!

Yōko Hanabusa (英 洋子, Hanabusa Yōko; born December 29, in Tokyo) is a Japanese shōjo manga artist. She debuted in 1978 with the short story Koi wa Happy Snow ni Notte (monthly HITOMI, AKITA Publishing Co., Ltd.).

== Selected bibliography ==
=== Shōjo manga ===
- Lady!! (レディ!!)

The manga was adapted into anime television series - Lady Lady!! and Hello! Lady Lynn in 1987 by Toei Animation Co., Ltd.

- Lady Lynn! (レディ リン!)

a sequel to Lady!!

- Lynn no Kodomotachi & Peter Pan (リンのこどもたち&ぴぃたぁぱん)

Hanabusa's official dojinshi that focuses on twin children of Lynn and Edward.

- Premier Muguet (プルミエ・ミュゲ) story by Kyoko Mizuki
- Heart ni Aozora Yohou (ハートに青空予報)
- Kirameki Green Age (きらめきグリーンエイジ)
- Milk Miracle (みるく みらくる)
- Majinai Ningyou (呪い人形)
- Time Princess (タイムプリンセス)
- Kurayami no Yubiwa (暗闇の指輪)
- Hoho Yosete Dakishimete (ほほよせて抱きしめて)
- Yaneura Beya e Youkoso (屋根裏部屋へようこそ)
- Hatsukoi Swimming (初恋スイミング)
- Engage Kiss (エンゲージ・キス)
- Jooubachi (女王蜂)
- Roma no Kyuujitu (ローマの休日) adapted from Roman Holiday Paramount Pictures

=== Manga adaptations of western romance novels ===
手紙 Tegami OHZORA PUBLISHING, Co.(2004/1) Original story by Lucy Gordon "Farelli's Wife"(Harlequin Romance, 3561)

- Idol Dreams リッツで夕食 (Charlotte Lamb, A Wild Affair) Dark Horse Comics, Inc.
- 鏡の中の女 (Charlotte Lamb, The Devil's Arm)
- 恋の砂漠 (Charlotte Lamb, Desert Barbarian)
- ローレライ愛の調べ (Lucy Gordon, Song of the Lorelei)
- 手紙 (Lucy Gordon, Farelli's Wife)
- ある日突然結婚 (Diana Hamilton, An Inconvenient Marriage)
- 身代わりプリンセス (Tracy Sinclair, The Princess Gets Engaged)
- 王子様とわたし (Elizabeth Harbison, Annie and the Prince)
- いつしか求愛 (Carole Mortimer, To Woo a Wife)
- あこがれる心の裏で (Carole Mortimer, To Be a Husband)
- 今夜だけのパートナー (Carole Mortimer, To Be a Bridegroom)
- 悩める伯爵 (Anne Ashley, The Earl of Rayne's Ward)
- 消えた子爵夫人 (Anne Ashley, Lady Linford's Return)
- 泥棒は恋の始まり (Anne Gracie, An Honourable Thief)
- 献身 (Violet Winspear, Passionate Sinner)
- ハリウッドの天使 (Violet Winspear, Lucifer's Angel)
- 情熱のマスカレード (Emma Darcy, The Power and the Passion)
- 王子様は、ある日突然 (Miranda Lee, Knight to the Rescue)
- プリンスと虹色の指輪 (Joan Elliott Pickart, Man...Mercenary...Monarch)
- 一夜だけの花嫁 (Day Leclaire, One Night Wife)
- 無邪気なかけひき (Penny Jordan, The Sheikh's Virgin Bride)
- 誘惑はオアシスで (Penny Jordan, One Night with the Sheikh)
- 砂塵に舞う花嫁 (Penny Jordan, Possessed by the Sheikh)
- 愛は復讐の果てに (Penny Jordan, The Perfect Seduction)
- 危険な結婚 (Helen Bianchin, A Passionate Surrender)
- 愛の惑い (Helen Bianchin, The Greek Bridegroom)
- 見知らぬ国で (Catherine George, Devil Within)
- 堕ちた愛人 (Susanne McCarthy, No Place for Love)
- プリンセスへの階段 (Cathie Linz, A Prince At Last!)
- フィアンセは当店で (Jackie Braun, One Fiancee to Go, Please)
- 銀色に光る海で (Miranda Jarrett, The Silver Lord)
- リメンバー・ミー (Sharon Sala, Remember Me)
- さらわれたハート (Barbara Cartland, The Wing of Ecstasy)
- 公爵の花嫁 (Barbara Cartland, A Nightingale Sang)
- My fiance is in love with my sister
