= Lady!! =

Japanese manga series

- Cover of the sixth manga volume (1989)

レディ!! (Redi!!)
- Genre: Drama; Romance; Historical; Slice of life Coming-of-age story Melodrama
- Manga
- Written by: Youko Hanabusa
- Published by: Akita Shoten
- Magazine: Hitomi Comics
- Original run: April 1, 1987 – January 1, 1993
- Volumes: 12
- Anime television series

Lady Lady!!
- Directed by: Hiroshi Shidara
- Produced by: Hiromi Seki; Hiroshi Inoue; Kazuo Yokoyama
- Music by: Kohei Tanaka
- Studio: Toei Animation
- Original network: JNN (TBS)
- Original run: October 21, 1987 – March 23, 1988
- Episodes: 21
- Anime film

Lady Lady!!
- Directed by: Hiroshi Shidara
- Produced by: Chiaki Imada
- Written by: Mitsuru Majima
- Music by: Kohei Tanaka
- Studio: Toei Animation
- Released: March 12, 1988
- Runtime: 27 minutes
- Related works
- Hello! Lady Lynn (2nd season)

Lady!! (レディ!!, Redi!!) is a Japanese manga series written and illustrated by Youko Hanabusa. It was published by Akita Shoten in the shōjo manga magazine Hitomi Comics from 1987 to 1993 and collected in 12 tankoubon volumes. The manga series was adapted into two anime television series, entitled, Lady Lady!! and its sequel Hello! Lady Lynn, produced by Toei Animation.

The first season of the anime series, entitled Lady Lady!! (レディレディ!!, Redi Redi!!) consists of 21 episodes and was aired on Wednesdays from October 21, 1987, to March 23, 1988, on TBS.

Youko later made two sequels, Lady Lynn!! (レディ リン!) and the dōjinshi Lynn no Kodomotachi & Peter Pan (リンのこどもたち&ぴぃたぁぱん). In Italy it was published with the original title by Goen from February 2011 to January 2013.

== Summary ==
Young Lynn and her mother travel from Japan to meet Lynn's father, the Viscount of Marble, who lives in England. On their way to the Marble Mansion, Lynn and her mother get into a tragic car accident in which Lynn's mother dies. When Lynn wakes up in the hospital, the truth about her mother's death is kept as a secret from her since her father cannot bear to bring her such grief.

Soon after, Lynn moves with her father to the Marble Mansion, where she encounters a miscellaneous cast of servants, most of who are charmed by Lynn's adorableness. Lynn also finds out that she is not the only child of the Viscount of Marble – she meets her elder half-sister Sarah, whose mother has also died. At first Sarah seems cold and distant towards her, but after a string of events, the two sisters finally form a strong bond.

Problems arise with the arrival of the scheming Waverleys, who take it upon themselves to run the household in the Marble Mansion while the Viscount of Marble is away. The motherless little girl tries to accommodate to the high society life and get the approval of the nobility. Her greatest wish is to become a true lady as her mother hoped her to be.

Much later, because of unpaid debts, the Russels lose the Marble Mansion to the bank. Sarah and Lynn are put into different homes. Nevertheless, Lynn never gives up and finally becomes a lady.

== Characters ==
Lynn Russell (リン・ラッセル, Rin Rasseru)
Voiced by: Sanae Miyuki
Lynn is a cheerful and innocent 5-year-old Anglo-Japanese girl who wishes to be accepted by her new family. She is naïve yet has an optimistic personality. She is the youngest daughter of The Viscount of Marble George Russell and Misuzu Midorikawa. Though she is half-British and half-Japanese, her appearance is predominantly English, especially having a wavy blonde hair. Hailing from Japan, her name was Rin Midorikawa (緑川 鈴, Midorikawa Rin), when she was still living there with her mother and her grandparents. Her name Lynn is sometimes spelled as Rin to keep her Japanese ancestry.
Her mother was killed from a car accident while protecting Lynn and wasn't told the truth until Magdalene Waverley coldly told her about it. She holds her mother's keepsake, the Lady's Key and promised that she'll persevere to become a true Lady. Lynn loves and cares for her father and sister very much that she is willing to make sacrifices even her own happiness just for their sake. She is good at horse riding, under the tutelage of Arthur and Edward and their steed Alexandra who is particularly fond of her. She has a pet kitten named Queen.
Sarah Frances Russell (セーラ・フランシス・ラッセル, Sēra Furanshisu Rasseru)
Voiced by: Chieko Honda
Sarah is Lynn's elder half-sister. She is the eldest daughter of The Viscount of Marble George Russell and Lady Frances Russell. She is 5 years elder than Lynn. Cold and distant at their first meeting, Sarah is actually kind and caring. Gradually, she cherishes Lynn as if she is her own younger sister, spurred on by their same state of being motherless, and defends her from the abuses of the Waverleys.
Unlike Lynn, Sarah doesn't have any memory of her mother because she died when Sarah was very young. Her mother's only keepsake is the flute and the musical score. She is very good at painting and an excellent flutist. Sarah has feelings for Arthur.
Arthur Drake Brighton (アーサー・ドレイク・ブライトン, Āsā Doreiku Buraiton)
Voiced by: Ryo Horikawa
Arthur is the eldest son of the noble Brighton family. He is Edward's elder brother. Calm, reserved and charming, Arthur is an excellent equestrian, and together with his noble steed Alexandra, wins a competition hosted by the equestrian club in the course of the series. He and Sarah have been friends long before Lynn arrived in England.
Edward Brighton (エドワード・ブライトン, Edowādo Buraiton)
Voiced by: Hidehiro Kikuchi
Edward is the youngest son of the noble Brighton family. He is Arthur's younger brother. He is Energetic and playful, and very protective of Lynn and would do anything for her sake. Though he can ride horses like his brother, he cannot ride Alexandra since the latter refuses to be ridden on by anyone except Arthur and Lynn. Later in the series, Edward manages to ride on Alexandra to stop Lynn from going back to Japan.
George Russell (ジョージ・ラッセル, Jōji Rasseru)
Voiced by: Hideyuki Tanaka
George is The Viscount of Marble and Sarah and Lynn's father. He is gentle and kind, he loves his children dearly and will do anything for their sakes. He is away on business trips a lot in order to pay back the money he owed to the bank for his businesses, with The Marble Mansion as the collateral. George works hard to the point of endangering his health. He is pressured by his father, The Duke of Woburn, to marry Magdalene Waverley to pay off his debts.
Frances Russell (フランシス・ラッセル, Furanshisu Rasseru)
Frances was the first wife of The Viscount of Marble and Sarah's mother. She has a kind and gentle personality and cares her loved ones very much. She died when Sarah was very young so Sarah does not have any memory of her. She and George met in the university and they rode horses together with their friends. She is also an excellent flutist. Her portrait hangs in the Marble Mansion. Throughout the series, she is seen as the ideal Lady, both by Sarah and Lynn.
Misuzu Midorikawa (緑川 美鈴, Midorikawa Misuzu)
Voiced by: Keiko Yokozawa
Misuzu is Lynn's mother. She met George when he was in Japan for a business trip. She also has a similar personality as his late wife and a reason why he chose her. She was killed from a tragic car accident while protecting Lynn from harm shortly after their arrival in England. Her wish for Lynn is to become a true Lady.
Magdalene Waverley (モードリン・ウィバリー, Mōdorin Wibarī)
Voiced by: Eiko Masuyama
Magdalene is Sarah and Lynn's almost stepmother. Together with her children, Thomas and Mary, they play as the antagonists of the story. She wants to marry The Viscount of Marble in order for her family to be incorporated in the nobility. She turns a blind eye to her children's wrongdoings while heaping the blame on Lynn. Her family is very wealthy and is capable of paying off George's debts.
Thomas Waverley (トマス・ウィバリー, Tomasu Wibarī)
Voiced by: Keiichi Nanba
Thomas is the eldest son of Magdalene Waverley and Sarah and Lynn's almost stepbrother. He is a mean and mischievous boy who, together with his sister Mary, enjoys tormenting Lynn. He has a penchant of playing with his pistol and shooting the roses and Mary's cat, Prince. He is also a habitual liar. However, he is quite cowardly and runs away when his pranks are found out.
Mary Waverley (メアリ・ウィバリー, Meari Wibarī)
Voiced by: Mayumi Shou
Mary is the youngest daughter of Magdalene Waverley and Sarah and Lynn's almost stepsister. Like her brother, she enjoys making Lynn miserable. Unlike Thomas though, she experiences pangs of conscience when her pranks go too far. She owns a Persian cat named Prince, but she is sometimes mean to him, and later disowns him at the end of the series.
The Duke of Woburn (ウォーバン公爵, Wōban-koushaku)
Voiced by: Kouji Totani
Richard Russell is the father of the Viscount of Marble and Sarah and Lynn's emotionally abusive grandfather. Brooding and serious, he refuses to recognize Lynn as a member of the family because of her origin. He pressures George to marry Magdalene Waverley to solve his money problems, to the point of offering to accept Lynn into the family if he does, or the Marble Mansion will be taken.
Isabel Montgomery (イザベル・モンゴメリ, Izaberu Mongomeri)
Voiced by: Nana Yamaguchi
Isabel is Richard's younger sister and the Countess Montgomery. A contrast with her brother, she is kind and understanding. She is charmed by Lynn's adorableness when they first meet. She subtly tries to make Richard more accepting of Lynn.
Robert (ロバート, Robāto)
Voiced by: Masaharu Satou
Robert is the household butler of The Marble Mansion.
Brenda (ブレンダ, Burenda)
Voiced by: Reiko Suzuki
Brenda is the head maid of The Marble Mansion.
Jill (ジル, Jiru)
Voiced by: Shino Kakinuma
Jill is a maid working at The Marble Mansion.
Tom (トム, Tomu)
Voiced by: Kouhei Miyauchi
Tom is the gardener of The Marble Mansion.
Prince (プリンス, Purinsu)
Voiced by: Noriko Uemura
Prince is Mary's pet Persian cat. Playful and mischievous, he is often used by Mary as a tool in her schemes against Lynn. Though often treated kindly by Lynn, Prince is consistently causing trouble for her. He often picks on Lynn's pet cat Queen. Later in the series, however, he was disowned by his owner and adopted by Lynn.

== Media ==
=== Manga ===
The series was originally released by Akita Shoten. It was licensed in French by Isan Manga under the title "Gwendoline. It was released in Italy by Goen, it was released from February 2011 to January 2013.

No.	Japanese release date	Japanese ISBN
1	April 23, 1987	978-4-253-08196-2
2	September 21, 1987	978-4-253-08197-9
3	January 6, 1988	978-4-253-08198-6
4	May 10, 1988	978-4-253-08199-3
5	October 31, 1988	978-4-253-08200-6
6	May 22, 1989	978-4-253-08263-1
7	November 2, 1989	978-4-253-08264-8
8	March 16, 1990	978-4-253-08265-5
9	August 30, 1990	978-4-253-08266-2
10	March 22, 1991	978-4-253-08267-9
11	March 19, 1992	978-4-253-08268-6
12	January 28, 1993	978-4-253-08269-3

=== List of episodes ===
No.	Title	Original release date
1	"Hello! I'm Lynn"; Transliteration: "Harō! Rin Desu" (Japanese: ハロー!リンです)	October 21, 1987
Lynn flies to England with her mother to meet her father. On their way to the mansion, her mother is killed in a tragic car accident. She meets her half-sister Sarah. She also meets Arthur and Edward Brighton and their horse, Alexandra.
2	"Two Little Gentlemen"; Transliteration: "Chiisana Shinshi ga Futari" (Japanese: 小さな紳士がふたり)	October 28, 1987
3	"The Uninvited Guest"; Transliteration: "Manekare-zaru Kyaku" (Japanese: 招かれざる客)	November 4, 1987
Magdalene Waverly shows up and tells Lynn and Sarah that she will be their mother once she marries their father. When Lynn asks why, the baroness coldly tells her about her mother's death.
4	"My Mother's Keepsake"; Transliteration: "Mama no Wasure-gatami" (Japanese: ママのわすれ形見)	November 11, 1987
George gives his daughter Lynn the Lady's Key, which belonged to Lynn's mother.
5	"Thomas' Plot"; Transliteration: "Tomasu no Waru-dakumi" (Japanese: トマスの悪だくみ)	November 18, 1987
Thomas shoots Alexandra with his BB gun and she throws off Edward and Lynn. Edward gets badly injured and Lynn is accused.
6	"Misunderstood Sincerity"; Transliteration: "Gokai sare ta Magokoro" (Japanese: 誤解されたまごころ)	December 2, 1987
Sarah and Arthur learn the truth behind what really happened to Edward and Lynn the day of the accident.
7	"The Oath to the Lady"; Transliteration: "Redi e no Chikai" (Japanese: レディへの誓い)	December 9, 1987
8	"Longed-for London"; Transliteration: "Akogare no Rondon" (Japanese: あこがれのロンドン)	December 16, 1987
Lynn's father visits the Marble Mansion and spends time with Sarah and Lynn
9	"Christmas Card of Love"; Transliteration: "Ai no Kurisumasu Kādo" (Japanese: 愛のクリスマス·カード)	December 23, 1987
10	"The Witch Dancing in the Snow"; Transliteration: "Yuki no Naka ni Majo ga Mau" (Japanese: 雪の中に魔女が舞う)	January 6, 1988
Mary steals the Lady's Key sends Lynn out in the snow to look for it. Lynn faints from the cold and fights a witch in her delirium. Mary feels bad and puts her key back. Alexandra breaks out of her stable and leads Arthur and Edward to Lynn.
11	"Do You Love the Aunt, Father?"; Transliteration: "Papa, Oba-sama o Ai Shite Iruno?" (Japanese: パパ.おば様を愛しているの?)	January 13, 1988
12	"Lynn's Adventure to Call Spring"; Transliteration: "Haru o Yobu Rin no Bōken" (Japanese: 春を呼ぶリンの冒険)	January 20, 1988
George is taking a week off from work and takes Lynn and Sarah on a vacation to visit Sarah's maternal relatives.
13	"Why Can't I Meet My Grandfather!?"; Transliteration: "Naze!? Ojī-sama ni Aenai no?" (Japanese: なぜ!?おじい様に会えないの?)	January 27, 1988
Sarah, Lynn and their father go meet the grandfather. He refuses to see Lynn but his sister, Isabel, warmly embraces her.
14	"In the Raining! Don't Break Down, Sarah"; Transliteration: "Ame no Naka! Onegai Sēra Taore nai de" (Japanese: 雨の中!お願いセーラ倒れないで)	February 3, 1988
Lynn is excited that she can finally go to school. Prince messes up her dress and Sarah goes out in the rain to get it washed and fixed.
15	"Why Can't I Go to School!?"; Transliteration: "Doushite!? Rin wa Gakkōni Haire Naino" (Japanese: どうして!?リンは学校には入れないの)	February 10, 1988
16	"Arthur! Please Help Sarah"; Transliteration: "Āsā! Onegai Sēra o Tasukete" (Japanese: アーサー!お願いセーラを助けて)	February 17, 1988
When Sarah's painting gets left behind, Arthur rides like the wind to get it submitted on time.
17	"Don't Leave Me! I Hate Being Alone"; Transliteration: "Sutenaide! Hitori-bocchi wa Iya" (Japanese: 捨てないで!ひとりぼっちはイヤ)	February 24, 1988
Tom gets fired
18	"Don't Lie! Lynn Make Everything Bad?"; Transliteration: "Uso Desho! Minna Rin ga Waruino?" (Japanese: ウソでしょ!みんなリンが悪いの?)	March 2, 1988
Sarah is black mailed by her grandfather that if her father marries Magdalene he will accept Lynn as a member of the family, if George refuses to marry Magdalene The Duke of Woburn will not allow Lynn to stay in England.
19	"I'm Hopeless! Father Will Marry"; Transliteration: "Rin mō Dame! Papa ga Kekkon Suruno" (Japanese: リンもうダメ!パパが結婚するの)	March 9, 1988
When Thomas and Mary blames Lynn for causing her mother's death Jill slaps Thomas and she gets fired by Magdalene.
20	"I'm Sorry, Sarah. I'll Return to Japan!"; Transliteration: "Gomen ne Sēra Rin Nippon ni Kaeru!" (Japanese: ごめんねセーラ リン 日本に帰る!)	March 16, 1988
George decides to marry Magdalene as the only condition for Lynn to be accepted by The Duke of Woburn if not, The Duke of Woburn will not allow her to stay in England.
21	"Farewell, England"; Transliteration: "Sayōnara Igirisu" (Japanese: さようならイギリス)	March 23, 1988
Lynn decides to go back to Japan forever so that her father won't marry Magdalene and make Sarah sad. Edward warns Arthur and Sarah and they race off to the airport to stop her.

=== Music ===
Opening Theme

- "LADY"
  Lyrics by Masumi Kawamura
  Composition and arrangement by Katsuhisa Hattori
  Performed by Shonentai
  Courtesy of Warner Pioneer

Ending Theme

- "The Moonlight for Only Two" (ふたりだけのムーンライト, Futari dake no Mūnraito)
  Lyrics by Masumi Kawamura
  Composition and arrangement by Katsuhisa Hattori
  Performed by Shonentai
  Courtesy of Warner Pioneer

Insert Theme

- "Hello Lady" (ハロー·レディ, Harō Redi)
  Lyrics by Takashi Matsumoto
  Composition by Kazuo Zaitsu
  Arrangement by Akira Nishihira
  Performed by Nami Shimada
  Courtesy of Columbia Records

=== Staff ===
Production Staff
Role	Name(s)
Director	Hiroshi Shidara
Producer	Kazuo Yokoyama, Hiromi Seki, Hiroshi Inoue
Episode Director	Toshihiko Arisako, Yasuo Yamayoshi
Character Design	Kazuhiro Ochi
Art Design	Takao Sawada
Storyline	Tomoko Konparu
Planning	Hiromi Seki, Kazuo Yokoyama
Production Manager	Yoshiro Sugawara
Music	Kōhei Tanaka
Production Company	Toei Animation, TBS

=== Home video ===
A DVD version was released in 2012.

== Reception ==
The manga was described as a combination of "Tears, tenderness and frills" while the series was said to be "overflowed by emotional moments".
