= Nagai (surname) =

Nagai (written: 永井 lit. eternal well or 長井 lit. "long well") is a Japanese surname. Notable people with the surname include:

- Fujio Nagai (永井 希仁男; 1951–2007), Japanese boxer
- Go Nagai, Japanese manga artist
- Hazuki Nagai (born 1994), Japanese field hockey player
- Hina Nagai (長井 陽菜; born 2003), a member of K-Pop girl group, LIGHTSUM
- Ikuko Nagai (永井 郁子; 1893–1983), Japanese soprano
- Jordan Nagai (born 2000), American former voice actor
- Jun Nagai (born 1944), Japanese middle-distance runner
- Kafū Nagai, Japanese novelist, playwright, essayist, and diarist
- Kazumasa Nagai (1929–2026), Japanese printmaker and graphic designer
- Kenji Nagai, Japanese journalist, killed in Myanmar
- Kensuke Nagai, Japanese footballer
- Koji Nagai, Japanese businessman, CEO of Nomura Holdings
- Koji Nagai (baseball), Japanese baseball coach
- Michiko Nagai, Japanese writer
- Mitsuya Nagai (長井 満也; born 1968), Japanese mixed martial artist, kickboxer and professional wrestler
- Nagai Naoyuki (永井 尚志; 1816–1896), Japanese samurai
- Ryo Nagai, Japanese footballer
- Shunta Nagai (永井 俊太; born 1982), Japanese footballer
- Takashi Nagai, Japanese radiologist and Catholic writer
- Tatsuo Nagai, Japanese writer
- Yasutomo Nagai (1965–1995), Japanese motorcycle racer
- Yuri Nagai (born 1992), Japanese field hockey player
