= Anne Hampson =

British writer (1928–2014)

- Born: 28 November 1928; England
- Died: 25 September 2014 (aged 85)
- Occupation: Novelist
- Writing career
- Pen name: Anne Hampson; Jane Wilby
- Period: 1969–2005
- Genre: Romantic novel

Anne Hampson (28 November 1928 – 25 September 2014) was a British writer of over 125 romance novels in Mills & Boon from 1969 to 1998. She published historical romance novels under the pseudonym Jane Wilby. Although she retired in 1998, in 2005 she published two romance and a crime novel. She has been written an autobiography entitled Fate Was My Friend.

== Early life ==
Hampson dreamed of teaching and writing when she was six, but due to the depression after World War II, she had to leave her studies at fourteen and begin making blouses for Marks & Spencer's. She left work when she married. She sold her sewing machine for £15 to the neighbour who later encouraged her to publish her first novel.

Later, when her marriage broke up, she had to return to work and lived in a mobile home in the village of Cuddington in Mid Cheshire. But, when Manchester University decided to trial older women she applied and graduated. She wrote articles about her travels in Greece and they were published in various education magazines. She also had an interest in fossils and sometimes went to the North Yorkshire coast to collect. Her first manuscript was a romance about Delphi where she had visited. This manuscript sat on a shelf in her mobile home until she showed it to Brice Burgum, a neighbour who said she should seek out an agent to get it published.

== Career ==
In 1973, she became a launch author for the new Harlequin Presents line of category romance novels. Harlequin Presents books were more sensual than the previous line, Harlequin Romance, under which she had been published. She was chosen to be a launch author because she, along with Violet Winspear and Anne Mather, were the most popular and prolific of Mills&Boon/Harlequin's authors.

== Bibliography ==
=== As Anne Hampson ===
==== Single novels ====
- Eternal Summer (1969)
- Autocrat of Melhurst (1969)
- Unwary Heart (1969)
- Precious Waif (1969)
- Beyond the Sweet Waters (1970)
- By Fountains Wild (1970)
- Hawk and the Dove (1970)
- Love Hath an Island (1970)
- When the Bough Breaks (1970)
- Isle of the Rainbows (1970)
- Gates of Steel (1970)
- Heaven Is High (1970)
- An Eagle Swooped (1970)
- Dark Hills Rising (1971)
- Rebel Bride (1971)
- Stars of Spring (1971)
- Wings of Night (1971)
- Gold Is the Sunrise (1971)
- Waves of Fire (1971)
- South of Mandraki (1971)
- Petals Drifting (1971)
- Follow a Shadow (1971)
- Beloved Rake (1972)
- Fair Island (1972)
- There Came a Tyrant (1972)
- Plantation Boss (1972)
- Wife for a Penny (1972)
- Dark Avenger (1972)
- Enchanted Dawn (1972)
- Master of Moonrock (1972)
- Thousand Stars (1972)
- After Sundown (1973)
- Blue Hills of Sintra (1973)
- Dear Plutocrat (1973)
- Dear Stranger (1973)
- When the Clouds Part (1973)
- Kiss from Satan (1973)
- Stormy the Way (1973)
- Windward Crest (1973)
- Hunter of the East (1973)
- Boss of Bali Creek (1973)
- Black Eagle (1973)
- Unwanted Bride (1973)
- Way of a Tyrant (1974)
- Moon Without Stars (1974)
- Fetters of Hate (1974)
- Stars Over Sarawak (1974)
- Not Far from Heaven (1974)
- Pride and Power (1974)
- Two of a Kind (1974)
- Jonty in love (1975)
- Reap the Whirlwind (1975)
- Where the South Wind Blows (1975)
- Flame of Fate (1975)
- South to Capricorn (1975)
- Autumn Twilight (1975)
- Call of the Outback (1976)
- Dangerous Friendship (1976)
- Man to Be Feared (1976)
- South of the Moon (1976)
- Song of the Waves (1976)
- Sunset Cloud (1976)
- Dear Benefactor (1976)
- Hills of Kalamata (1976)
- Satan and the Nymph (1976)
- Fire Meets Fire (1976)
- Isle at the Rainbow's End (1976)
- Beloved Vagabond (1977)
- Sweet Is the Web (1977)
- Man of Importance (1977)
- Harbour of Love (1977)
- Bitter Harvest (1977)
- Isle of Desire (1977)
- Fly Beyond the Sunset (1977)
- The Shadow Between (1977)
- Call of the Veld (1977)
- For Love of a Pagan (1978)
- Leaf in the Storm (1978)
- Moon Dragon (1978)
- Under Moonglow (1978)
- Master of Forrestmead (1978)
- To Tame a Vixen (1978)
- Temple of the Dawn (1979)
- Bride for a night (1979)
- Coolibah Creek (1979)
- Rose from Lucifer (1979)
- Chateau in the Palms (1979)
- Laird of Locharrun (1980)
- Payment in Full (1980)
- Stormy Masquerade (1980)
- Call of the Heathen (1980)
- Pagan Lover (1980)
- Second Tomorrow (1980)
- Man of the Outback (1980)
- Dawn Steals Softly (1980)
- Laird of Locharrun (1980)
- Desire (1981)
- Enchantment (1981)
- Man Without a Heart (1981)
- Where Eagles Nest (1981)
- Shadows of Apollo (1981)
- The Tender Years (1982)
- Another Eden (1982)
- Fascination (1982)
- A Kiss and a Promise (1982)
- Man Without Honour (1982)
- Realm of the Pagans (1982)
- Stardust (1982)
- South of Capricorn (1982)
- Devotion (1983)
- Dreamtime (1983)
- Love So Rare (1983)
- Strangers May Marry (1983)
- There Must be Showers (1983)
- To Buy a Memory (1983)
- When Love Comes (1983)
- Dawn Is Golden (1983)
- Spell of the Island (1984)
- Sweet Second Love (1984)
- Soft, Velvet Night (1984)
- Destiny (1988)
- A Touch of Romance (1988)
- Pemberley Place (1997)
- Legacy of Hate (1998)
- Night Is Ours (2005)
- The Dead Can't Kill (2005)

==== Collections ====
- When The Bough Breaks / Love Hath an Island / Stars of Spring (1980)

=== As Jane Wilby ===
==== Single novels ====
- Eleanor and the Marquis (1977)
- Man of Consequence (1979)

==== Anthologies in collaboration ====
- The Runaways / Eleanor and the Marquis / A Rose for Danger / The Secret of Val Verde (1977) (with Marguerite Bell, Judith Polley and Julia Herbert)
- Eleanor and the Marquis / The Runaways / A Rose for Danger / Puritan Wife (1977) (with Marguerite Bell, Judith Polley and Elizabeth De Guise)

=== Autobiography ===
- Fate Was My Friend
