= The Sword of Paros =

Japanese manga series

- First tankōbon volume cover

パロスの剣 (Parosu no Ken)
- Genre: Fantasy, Romance
- Manga
- Written by: Kaoru Kurimoto
- Illustrated by: Yumiko Igarashi
- Published by: Kadokawa Shoten, Chuokoron-Shinsha
- English publisher: Manga Mavericks
- Magazine: Monthly Asuka
- Original run: March 1986 – February 1987
- Volumes: 3
- Novel series
- Written by: Kaoru Kurimoto
- Illustrated by: Yumiko Igarashi
- Published by: Kadokawa Shoten
- Imprint: Kadokawa Bunko
- Volumes: 1

The Sword of Paros (パロスの剣, Parosu no Ken) is a Japanese shoujo historical fantasy manga written by Kaoru Kurimoto and illustrated by Yumiko Igarashi. It was serialized in Kadokawa Shoten's Monthly Asuka manga magazine from March 1986 to February 1987. It was later adapted into a novel by Kurimoto that was published by Kadokawa Bunko on October 25, 1989.

The story is set thousands of years before Kurimoto's long running Guin Saga, and strongly centred on the romance of the protagonists, one of whom, like Oscar in The Rose of Versailles, is trying to pass as a man.

== Plot ==
Far away and long ago in the kingdom of Paros, legend says that one can wield the sacred sword of the true ruler of Paros. According to this legend, in time of war, a single person will come forward, who can brandish this weapon and lead the country towards the future. This prophecy also asserts that the true ruler, who will carry Paros to a future of light and prosperity, is neither man nor woman, while the one who will wield the sword wrongfully, and so destroy Paros forever, is neither man nor woman.

Unfortunately, in the kingdom of Paros, war is in the air: the neighbouring realm of Kauros wants in fact to conquer - through diplomacy, or through open war - the prosperous Kingdom of the Sword. The King of Paros, unfortunately, does not have a male heir, but only the Princess Erminia, who has grown up as if she were a boy.

Princess Erminia is widely noted for her strong-willed and independent character. However, under the kingdom's succession laws, only men are permitted to rule, meaning that her future husband would become king regnant. In this context, her father instructs her to marry in order to avoid a political union with the Prince of Kauros, which could result in Paros being absorbed into Kauros.

Erminia does not intend to obey her father's wishes. She tells her true friend, Yurias, that she feels that she is caught in a woman's body, possessing the mind of a man. Yurias is secretly in love with Erminia.

Fiona is one simple laundry maid of the castle of Paros, with a kind heart. However, she lives a life of uneasiness and suffering because of her poverty. When she was little, Fiona met in a barn a young prince who took care of her for a night. From then on, Fiona has lived her life hoping to see her prince again.

Because of a fortuitous series of events, Erminia one day saves Fiona from a wild horse. From then on, the two girls begin to fall in love. Erminia tells Fiona of how trapping she finds being a princess, and how she feels about being born in the body of a woman. Fiona then tells Erminia of her young prince, and Erminia realises that she was Fiona's young prince. She is elated that Fiona sees her as being her prince, and Erminia kisses Fiona. They dance, kiss and exchange promises on the night of the Carnival of Paros.

But the war between Kauros and Paros is imminent, and the king of Paros tries to force Erminia to marry. Finding her shoulders to the wall again, Erminia decides to consent to the wish of her father, on the condition that her husband is chosen through a tournament. The last victor to this series of duels will have to defeat Erminia in battle in order to win her hand. Her father begins to arrange the competition, confident that Yurias will win.

Whilst this is going on, Fiona has been abducted, raped, and left for dead. As Erminia is cloistered, she does not know of Fiona's fate.

During the final duel, the knights of Paros are focussing their attention on the duel, allowing the knights of Kauros to sneak in, even as the traitor Prince Alfonse tosses her the Sword of Paros to use in the battle. At this point, Erminia's father is assassinated, and Alfonse proclaims his death to be part of the legend of the Sword. The duel is stopped, and the Prince of Kauros is declared the victor. Taken captive by the guards of Kauros, Erminia is convinced that she has lost everything. Fiona has vanished, Yurias has been defeated and half-blinded, her father is dead, and she will be forced to marry the Prince of Kauros.

Just when all seems to be at its worst, the peasants of the kingdom of Paros rebel against the Kauran soldiers. Fiona is part of the group that intends to free Erminia, by having Fiona take Erminia's place. Erminia cannot bear the thought of this, and so the two escape together on a horse provided by Yurias.

== Characters ==
Fiona (left) and Erminia (right)

Erminia (エルミニア, Eruminia)
The princess of Paros and sole heir to the throne, she considers herself to have been 'born with both a man's heart and a woman's heart'. She has just come of age, but she does not want to marry and only find worth in bearing a prince for Paros. She yearns for freedom and adventure.
Fiona (フィオナ, Fiona)
A young washerwoman who serves at the royal palace of Paros. An orphan, she has always dreamed of finding the prince of her childhood again, for which she is often mocked for by the other servants.
Yuriasu (ユリアス, Yuriasu)
Having lost his mother, he was raised alongside Erminia. Over time, Yuriasu developed unrequited romantic feelings for Erminia, who, while loving him like a brother, repeatedly rejected him.
Phaon (ファオン, Faon)
Heir to the throne of the neighboring kingdom of Kauros. He is a traveling prince, and his first duel with Erminia takes place during the carnival celebrations in Paros, when both are attending the popular festivities incognito.
Alphonse (アルフォンス, Arufonsu)
Half-brother of the king and uncle of Erminia, Alphonse has always had close dealings with the rival kingdom of Kauros. His thirst for power and natural talent for deception make him a slippery and deceitful figure, a proponent of court subterfuge and shadowy crimes.

== Publication ==
=== Manga ===
Written by Kaoru Kurimoto and illustrated by Yumiko Igarashi, The Sword of Paros was serialized in Kadokawa Shoten's Monthly Asuka manga magazine from March 1986 to February 1987. The series was collected in three tankōbon volumes.

Manga Mavericks announced during their panel at Anime Expo 2026 that they had licensed the series for an English print publication, compiling all three volumes into a single deluxe hardcover collection.

No.	Original release date	Original ISBN	English release date	English ISBN
1	February 4, 1987	9784049240016	April 27, 2027	9781968054588
2	March 4, 1987	9784049240061	April 27, 2027	9781968054588
3	May 7, 1987	9784049240122	April 27, 2027	9781968054588

=== Novel ===
No.	Release date	ISBN
1	October 25, 1989	9784041500293
