= Violet Winspear =

British writer (1928–1989)

- Born: 28 April 1928; London, England
- Died: January 1989 (aged 60)
- Occupation: Novelist
- Writing career
- Pen name: Violet Winspear
- Period: 1961–1987
- Genre: Romance

Violet Winspear (28 April 1928 – January 1989) was a British writer of 70 romance novels in Mills & Boon from 1961 to 1987.

In 1973, she became a launch author for the new Mills & Boon-Harlequin Presents line of category romance novels. Presents line books were more sexually explicit than the previous line, Romance, under which Winspear had been published. She was chosen to be a launch author because she, along with Anne Mather and Anne Hampson were the most popular and prolific British authors of Mills and Boon.

In 1970, Winspear commented that she wrote her leading males as if they were 'capable of rape'. This comment caused uproar and led to her receiving hate mail.

== Biography ==
Violet Winspear was born on 28 April 1928 in London, England. She worked in a factory since 1942, when in 1961 she sold her first romance novels to Mills & Boon. In 1963, she became a full-time writer. She wrote from her home in the South East England, an area which she never left, but she researched her far-flung settings at the local library. She said: "The real aim of romance is to provide escape and entertainment", but when in 1970 she commented: "I get my heroes so that they're lean and hard muscled and mocking and sardonic and tough and tigerish and single, of course. Oh and they've got to be rich and then I make it that they're only cynical and smooth on the surface. But underneath they're well, you know, sort of lost and lonely. In need of love but, when roused, capable of breathtaking passion and potency. Most of my heroes, well all of them really, are like that. They frighten but fascinate. They must be the sort of men who are capable of rape: men it's dangerous to be alone in the room with". The comment that they were "capable of rape" caused uproar and lead to her receiving hate mail. She never married, and had no children, but she inspired her nephew Jonathan to write.

== Death ==
Violet Winspear died at January 1989 after a long battle with cancer.

== Book notes ==
Winspear's novels take the readers around the world. Even though many of her storylines are uninspiring, she excels at boldly using the written words to vividly bring to life the surroundings of her plots. For example, The Palace of the Peacocks (1969). Many established Harlequin novelists such as Robyn Donald and Kay Thorpe, employ sexual antagonism in developing conflict in their stories. These devices are popular with modern readers. For instance, Robyn Donald creates leaping sexual awareness between men and women. Since men are quick to acknowledge this vital force, Robyn casts them into the role of hunter and as women label it as a weakness to despise and overcome, she makes them the prey. This is the adversarial set up that drives her plots forward. Employing the same motif of sexual antagonism, critics say that Winspear, contrasts her hero and heroine in such extremes that the heroine lacks awareness of her own sexuality against the hero who is fully aware of his. This lends her stories an acute imbalance in character development where the heroine is left bemused with an alpha male hero who exerts overwhelming control over every situation.

== Bibliography ==
=== Single novels ===
- Lucifer's Angel (1961)
- Wife Without Kisses (1961)
- Strange Waif (1962)
- House of Strangers (1963)
- Beloved Tyrant (1964)
- Love's Prisoner (1964)
- Cap Flamingo (1964)
- Bride's Dilemma (1965)
- Desert Doctor (1965)
- Tower of the Captive (1966)
- Viking Stranger (1966)
- Tender Is the Tyrant (1967)
- Beloved Castaway (1968)
- Court of the Veils (1968)
- Blue Jasmine (1969)
- Palace of the Peacocks (1969)
- Unwilling Bride (1969)
- Dangerous Delight (1969)
- Pilgrim's Castle (1969)
- Chateau of St. Avrell (1970)
- Cazalet Bride (1970)
- Castle of the Seven Lilacs (1971)
- Bride of Lucifer (1971)
- Dear Puritan (1971)
- Black Douglas (1971)
- Raintree Valley (1971)
- Little Nobody (1972)
- Silver Slave (1972)
- Rapture of the Desert (1972)
- Devil in a Silver Room (1973)
- Kisses and the Wine (1973)
- Forbidden Rapture (1973)
- Glass Castle (1973)
- Noble Savage (1974)
- Palace of the Pomegranate (1974)
- Girl at Goldenhawk (1974)
- Dearest Demon (1975)
- Devil's Darling (1975)
- Satan Took a Bride (1975)
- Darling Infidel (1976)
- Sin of Cynara (1976)
- Burning Sands (1976)
- The Sun Tower (1976)
- Love Battle (1977)
- Passionate Sinner (1977)
- Time of the Temptress (1977)
- Love in a Stranger's Arms (1977)
- Loved and the Feared (1977)
- Valdez Marriage (1978)
- Awakening of Alice (1978)
- Desire Has No Mercy (1979)
- Sheik's Captive (1979)
- A Girl Possessed (1980)
- Love's Agony (1981)
- Man She Married (1982)
- By Love Bewitched (1984)
- Brides Lace (1984)
- Secret Fire (1984)
- House of Storms (1985)
- Sun Lord's Woman (1985)
- Syn of Cynara (1986)
- The Honeymoon (1986)
- A Silken Barbarity (1987)
- Primavera em Veneza (1982)

=== Stephanos Saga ===
1. The Honey Is Bitter (1967)
2. Dragon Bay (1969)
3. The Pagan Island (1972)

=== Romanos Saga ===
1. Tawny Sands (1970)
2. No Man of Her Own (1981)

=== Mavrakis Saga ===
1. The Child of Judas (1976)
2. Love is the honey (1980)

=== Anthologies ===
- The Fifth Anthology of 3 Harlequin Romances by Violet Winspear (1981)
- The Sixth Anthology of 3 Harlequin Romances by Violet Winspear (1983)

=== Graphic novels ===
Blue Jasmine OHZORA PUBLISHING, Co.(2004/9)

- Blue Jasmine (Art by Masae Hashimoto)
- Passionate Sinner (Art by Yoko Hanabusa)
- Lucifer's Angel (Art by Yoko Hanabusa)
- Desert Doctor (Art by Naomi Hibiki)
- Dragon Bay (Art by Rin Ogata)
- Love is the Honey (Art by Amii Hayasaka)
- The Child of Judas (Art by Misao Hoshiai)
- The Burning Sands (Art by Misao Hoshiai)
- Time of the Tempress (Art by Misao Hoshiai)
- Pilgrim's Castle (Art by Misuzu Sasaki)
- Sun Loard's Woman (Art by Rinko Nagami)
- A Silken Barbarity (Art by Kaishi Sakuya)

== Musicals ==
In 1983, Takarazuka Snow Troupe staged Blue Jasmine.

Director / Playwright: Ken Ako
Composer / Arranger: Takio Terada, Kenji Yoshizaki
Kasim ben Hussayn: Rei Asami
Lorna Morel: Kurara Haruka
Rodney: Michi Taira
