= Georgie! =

Japanese manga series

- Cover of the 2007 reprint of the first manga volume

ジョージィ! (Jōjī!)
- Genre: Romance, drama
- Manga
- Written by: Mann Izawa
- Illustrated by: Yumiko Igarashi
- Published by: Shogakukan
- Magazine: Shōjo Comic
- Original run: 1982 – 1984
- Volumes: 5
- Anime television series

Lady Georgie
- Directed by: Shigetsuga Yoshida
- Music by: Takeo Watanabe
- Studio: Tokyo Movie Shinsha
- Licensed by: NA: Discotek Media
- Original network: ANN (ABC, TV Asahi)
- Original run: April 9, 1983 – February 25, 1984
- Episodes: 45

Georgie! (ジョージィ!, Jōjī!) is a manga series, written by Mann Izawa and illustrated by Yumiko Igarashi. It was serialized from 1982 to 1984 in the Shōjo Comic manga magazine.

The series was adapted in 1983 into an anime television series, Lady Georgie (レディジョージィ, Redi Jōjī), by Tokyo Movie Shinsha, which originally premiered across TV Asahi and spanned 45 episodes.

The animated series was released in the United States by Discotek Media on Standard Definition Blu-Ray in Japanese audio with English subtitles.

== Story ==
Georgie is a charming, lively girl who grew up in Australia. She is very much loved by her father and adored by her two brothers, Abel and Arthur. Her mother, on the other hand, seems to harbor resentment over Georgie especially after the death of her father, for which she is blamed.

Growing up, Georgie noticed her hair color is different from those of her family. While everyone else had brunette hair, hers is blonde. Eventually, the mother broke the news to her that she was not part of the family and was actually adopted. A gold bracelet is her only clue to the past. After gaining some information about her birth parents who are British, she decided to go to London to find out more about her past. She was willingly accompanied by her brothers. Both brothers were secretly in love with her but had been trying to keep it because she is their adoptive sister. Apart from wanting to learn about her parents, Georgie also has another goal, which is to find her lost love, Lowell, who had left Australia and moved to London some years ago. Along with her brothers, Georgie experiences both the kindness and cruelty of the real world in London, England.

The story progresses with her search for her real family along with the love triangle that develops between her adoptive brothers as well as Lowell.

The end of the plot drastically changes and is different from the manga series on which it has been based. In the animated series, there is a happy and quite ambiguous ending while the manga has a more dramatic ending.

In both media, the story is the same from the beginning (except for minor details) but near the point of the ending, it changes when Georgie is forced to leave her first love, Lowell because of his tuberculosis, which can be healed only by an expensive operation that they can't pay because of lack of money.

=== Anime ===
In the anime series, after Georgie leaves Lowell because of his illness to Elisa (his promised wife from a rich family). She then reunited with her brother Abel while Arthur was kept captive by the Duke of Dangering, a nobleman who leads an illegal drug trafficking ring in London. The same man accused Georgie's father of the attempted murder of the Queen. Because of this accusation, Georgie's father was deported to Australia with his family. They have successfully rescued Arthur with the help of Fritz and the Duke's daughter, Mary who fell in love with Arthur. Although Dangering's son Arwin, the sadistic man who tortured Arthur during his imprisonment, tried to stop them, he died by falling from his horse during the pursuit. Arthur informed the Queen about the criminal offenses of Dangering and for this, the Duke was arrested while Georgie's father was absolved from all accusations. Georgie then decided to return to her home in Australia with her brothers before saying goodbye to her father and Lowell who is now officially married to Elisa.

=== Manga ===
In the manga, the pursuit ends in a different way. Georgie and Abel managed to rescue Arthur although the boy is mentally tested by the drugs which Arwin used on him to keep him quiet during imprisonment in Dangering mansion. He then committed suicide by throwing himself in the river Thames. Meanwhile, Abel who substituted himself for Arthur to rescue his brother is unmasked by Arwin who is killed by Abel. The boy is accused of murder by Arwin's father and is arrested and condemned to death by shooting. Georgie went to visit him in prison where the two finally discovered their feelings for one another and had sex. Georgie's father tried to help Abel who revealed Dangering's crimes during his execution, but the duke grabbed a gun and shoot him. Abel dies in Georgie's arms while Dangering was executed for shooting Abel. Some months later Georgie found out that she is pregnant with Abel's son. She decided that they will return to Australia where she discovered that Arthur is alive and didn't drown in the river Thames as previously believed. He was rescued by a fishing boat and returned to Australia. The manga ended with the three of them talking and playing in a big field. It is implied that they will live together as a family and rekindle their memory of Abel.

== Anime ==
=== Cast ===
- Georgie: Yuriko Yamamoto
- Arthur: Reiko Kitō (young) / Isao Nagahisa (adult)
- Abel: Eiko Yamada (young) / Hideyuki Hori (adult)
- Kevin: Kyōsuke Maki
- Mother: Miyuki Ueda
- Royal (Lowell J. Grey): Yūji Mitsuya
- Narrator: Yasuko Endō (遠藤泰子, not to be confused with Yasuko Endō/遠藤康子)

=== Staff ===
- Story: Mann Izawa
- Art: Yumiko Igarashi
- Script: Hiroshi Kaneko, Senhito Asakura, Noboru Shiroyama
- Art director: Junzaburo Takahata
- Music: Takeo Watanabe

=== Theme songs ===
- OP: Wasurerareta Message (忘れられたメッセージ, Wasurerareta Messēji) (Lyrics: Kazuya Senke, composition: Takeo Watanabe, arrangement: Nozomi Aoki, performance: Yuriko Yamamoto)
- ED: Yasashisa o Arigatō (やさしさをありがとう) (Lyrics: Mann Izawa, composition: Takeo Watanabe, arrangement: Nozomi Aoki, performance: Yuriko Yamamoto)

=== Insert songs ===
- Ai no Bracelet (愛のブレスレット, Ai no Buresuretto) (Lyrics: Kazuya Senke, composition: Takeo Watanabe, arrangement: Nozomi Aoki, performance: Yuriko Yamamoto)
- Ashita no Meguri Ai (あしたのめぐり逢い) (Lyrics: Toyohisa Araki, composition: Takeo Watanabe, arrangement: Nozomi Aoki, performance: Yuriko Yamamoto)
- Boomerang (ブーメラン, Būmeran) (Lyrics: Kouichi Hino, composition: Takeo Watanabe, arrangement: Takeo Watanabe, performance: Yuriko Yamamoto)
- Otōsan no Komori Uta (父さんの子守歌) (Lyrics: Mann Izawa, composition: Takeo Watanabe, arrangement: Nozomi Aoki, performance: Yuriko Yamamoto)

=== Episodes ===
1. The Bracelet's Secret
2. Daddy Promised
3. The Lezard's Island
4. Daddy Stay with Us
5. Will They Sell the Farm?
6. Children's Dreams
7. The Bracelet Lost
8. Sister Katie
9. The Other Abel
10. Happy Birthday Mother
11. An Unexpected Visit
12. Georgie's New Room
13. Abel is Jealous
14. The Wolves
15. Bettie the Vermin
16. The Birthday Dinner
17. Kim Finds a Bride
18. The Gentleman
19. Georgie the Dressmaker
20. Abel's Going Away
21. Blue as the Sky
22. Abel is Back
23. The Railroad
24. First Kiss
25. The Secret Revealed
26. A Night of Storm
27. Georgie's Sadness
28. A Cruel Dilemma
29. Georgie's Decision
30. Mother's Death
31. Towards England
32. Three Ships
33. The Terrible Piege
34. The Reunion
35. Dreams and Tears
36. The Blind
37. Abel's Judgement
38. The Duke's Menaces
39. The Debutants' Ball
40. The Fear
41. Georgie Sells the Bracelet
42. The Sacrifice
43. Farewell Laurent
44. Father
45. The Nightmare's End
