= Hello! Lady Lynn =

Television series

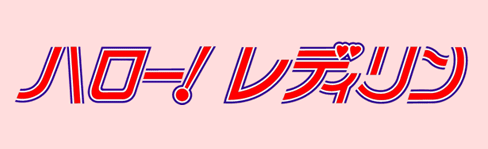
- ハロー!レディリン
- Genre: Drama; Romance; Historical; Slice of life Coming-of-age story School drama
- Based on: Lady!! by Youko Hanabusa
- Directed by: Hiroshi Shidara
- Music by: Kohei Tanaka
- Country of origin: Japan
- Original language: Japanese
- No. of episodes: 36

Production
- Producers: Kazuo Yokoyama; Seki Hiromi
- Production companies: Toei Animation; Toei Advertising

Original release
- Network: TXN (TV Tokyo)
- Release: May 12, 1988 – January 26, 1989

Related
- Lady!!

Hello! Lady Lynn (ハロー!レディリン, Harō! Redi Rin) is the second season of the anime series, Lady Lady!!, produced by Toei Animation Co., Ltd. It consists of a total of 36 episodes and was aired on Thursdays from May 12, 1988, to January 26, 1989, on TV Tokyo. The series was produced due to the success of the previous series. Unlike the previous series, it features a unique story and setting that differs from the original Lady!!. The overall story is concluded in episode 32, with the following four episodes being produced as a compilation. While the voice actors have changed due to a change in broadcasting network, the main staff continues to participate from the previous series.

== Plot ==
3 years after Lady!!, Lynn starts a new life, living separately from her family. Her sister Sarah lives at her grandfather's place at Woburn Castle, and her father works to repurchase the Marble Mansion. She studies at Saint Patrick Academy, a reputed horse-riding school. She makes friends and enemies along the way to attain the Lady Crest, a prestigious honor, with her noble steed Andrews. Will they overcome the obstacles coming in their way? Can Lynn return to her old home?

== Characters ==
Lynn Russell (リン·ラッセル, Rin Rasseru)
Voiced by: Kumiko Nishihara
Lynn is a cheerful and friendly 8-year-old girl who slowly wins the affections of the people around her. She is a first-year student at Saint Patrick Academy and a member of equestrian club. When she befriends the unruly horse, Andrews, she becomes the center of attention of the town, as well as the object of ire and envy of her schoolmates who are eying Lady Crest.
Andrews (アンドリュウス, Andoryuusu)
Andrews is an Arabian horse. He has characteristically bay or chestnut in color. He was formerly Vivian's steed. He has a fear of squirrels. He inherited his marvelous skills from his mother, Gloria.
Sarah Frances Russell (セーラ·フランシス·ラッセル, Sēra Furanshisu Rasseru)
Voiced by: Chiharu Kataishi
Sarah is Lynn's elder half sister. After losing The Marble Mansion, she is now living at Woburn Castle, her grandfather's place. Kind and caring, she is often concerned of her younger sister's well-being. Despite living separately, she and Lynn still share a strong bond. They both have golden heart-shaped lockets given to them by their father, The Viscount of Marble. In the locket is a picture of the three of them as well as the words engraved that characterize a true Lady: Merciful, Courageous, and Noble. As a skilled flutist, she has a tendency to play the flute whenever she is troubled or in deep thought, and sometimes to comfort her grandfather.
George Russell (ジョージ·ラッセル, Jōji Rasseru)
Voiced by: Rokuro Naya
George is Sarah and Lynn's father. After losing The Marble Mansion, George is working hard to pay all of his debts and regain it from the bank. He is frequently away but loves his children dearly.
Misuzu Midorikawa (緑川 美鈴, Midorikawa Misuzu)
Voiced by: Mika Doi
Misuzu is Lynn's deceased mother. She died in a car crash three years ago. She appears in her dreams to encourage her whenever she is downhearted.
Arthur Drake Brighton (アーサー·ドレイク·ブライトン, Āsā Doreiku Buraiton)
Voiced by: Shigeru Nakahara
Arthur is the eldest son and heir of the noble Brighton family. He is in love with Sarah.
Edward Philip Brighton (エドワード·ブライトン, Edowādo Buraiton)
Voiced by: Keiichi Nanba
Edward is Arthur's younger brother and Lynn's childhood friend. He is a student at Winston Churchill Boarding Academy. Good-looking and a skilled equestrian, Edward is the object of Vivian's affections . However, he is in love with Lynn.
The Duke of Woburn (ウォーバン公爵, Wōban-koushaku)
Voiced by: Hidekatsu Shibata
Richard Russell is George's Father and Sarah and Lynn's Grandfather
Isabel Montgomery (イザベル·モンゴメリ, Izaberu Mongomeri)
Voiced by: Reiko Mutō
Isabel is the Countess Montgomery and she lives at Montgomery Mansion where Lynn is living at.
Sophie Montgomery (ソフィ·モンゴメリ, Sofi Mongomeri)
Voiced by: Yūko Mita
Hailing from France, Sophie is the Granddaughter of The Countess Montgomery. At the beginning of the series, she puts up a sweet and innocent facade while scheming to put Lynn in a bad light in order to ensure that the Countess' inheritance will go to her family. She loves her mother dearly and does what it takes to please her even though she knows that actions against Lynn were wrong. Fear of being lonely in her life, she is afraid of being put into a dormitory. Lynn, being naïve, cared for her as her little sister and understands what she is going through. Though Sophie has a mother, she does not feel any motherly love from her. After the incident her pet squirrel Roi, Sophie changed her attitude towards Lynn and become friendly with her. She usually carries a doll around with her, the only gift she received from her mother on her birthday.
Jeanne Montgomery (ジャンヌ·モンゴメリ, Jannu Mongomeri)
Voiced by: Kazuko Yanaga
Jeanne is Sophie's mother. Threatened by Lynn's closeness with the Countess Montgomery, she used her own daughter to make sure that they will be the ones to inherit the Countess' inheritance, frequently threatening Sophie to return her to the Boarding School.
Vivian Spencer (ヴィヴィアン·スペンサー, Bibian Supensā)
Voiced by: Maria Kawamura
Vivian is the captain of Saint Patrick Academy girls' equestrian club. She is renowned as the "queen" of horseback riding because of her outstanding performance in horsemanship and is admired by her peers. Strict and exacting, she is a gifted equestrienne. She is the former rider of Andrews and current rider of Elizabeth. Threatened by Lynn's popularity when she managed to tame Andrews, Vivian treats Lynn harshly. Her feeling of dislike for Lynn is further fueled when she notices that Edward is more interested in Lynn than in her. She allied herself with Mary, who also resented Lynn for ruining her mother's marriage arrangement and to become one of the nobility classes. After the accident, Vivian's attitude towards Lynn gradually changes and began to accept her and even support her in her struggles. She is often accompanied by her entourages Phyllis and Matilda.
Phyllis (フェリース, Ferīsu)
Voiced by: {{{1}}}
Phyllis is a classmate and friend of Vivian and Matilda. She is a member of girls' equestrian club. Like Vivian, Phyllis and Matilda are discontented with Lynn thinking that they will be outdone by a junior who is not affiliated with them.
Matilda (マチルダ, Machiruda)
Voiced by: {{{1}}}
Matilda is the bespectacled friend of Vivian and Phyllis. She is a member of girls' equestrian club.
Catherine Baker (キャサリン·ベーカー, Kyasarin Bēkā)
Voiced by: Mayumi Shou
Catherine or Cathy, is Vivian's close cousin. She is a transferred first-year student and a newest member of the girls' equestrian club in Saint Patrick Academy. Keen and intelligent, she is a talented equestrienne and only first-year allowed to ride Elizabeth. Unlike her cousin, she sees Lynn as a good friend and a commendable rival. She is also competing for the tournament championship and for the Lady Crest.
Philip Anderson (フィリップ·アンダーソン, Firippu Andāson)
Voiced by: Hiroshi Takemura
Philip is the captain of the St. Patrick Academy boys' equestrian club and an acquaintance of Edward. Like Edward, he is good-looking and a skilled equestrian. He occasionally hangs around at girls' equestrian club's premises to see Vivian practicing. He has feelings for Vivian though he does not want to admit it to her, knowing that she has feelings for Edward.
Zara (サラ)
Voiced by: Miyoko Aoba
Lynn's friend and classmate. She is also a member of equestrian club.
Dorothy (ドロシー, Doroshī)
Voiced by: Yuko Minaguchi
Lynn's friend and classmate. She is quite timid around people. She recently joined the equestrian club.
Suzie (スージー, Sūjī)
Voiced by: Kimie Hangai
Suzie is one of Lynn's classmate and a member of school's disciplinary committee. She is also a member of tennis club, and Mary's underclassman. She is quite discontented with Lynn after the incident with Andrews and the attention she is getting.
Headmaster (校長, Kouchou)
Voiced by: Kōji Yada
His name was not mentioned in the series; he is the headmaster of Saint Patrick Academy. He is an old acquaintance of Countess Isabel Montgomery and her late husband.
Eric (エリック, Erikku)
Voiced by: Michitaka Kobayashi
Eric is Paul and Nancy's elder brother. Ever since their parents died, he has been running a small shop to support his younger siblings.
Paul (ポール, Pōru)
Voiced by: Tsutomu Kashiwakura
Paul is Eric's younger brother and one of Lynn's friends.
Nancy (ナンシー, Nanshī)
Voiced by: Saori Suzuki
Nancy is Eric and Paul's younger sister.
Peggy (ペギー, Pegī)
Voiced by: Shino Kakinuma
Peggy is the daughter of a general store's owner.
Henry (ヘンリー, Henrī)
Voiced by: Yonehiko Kitagawa
Henry is the household butler and chauffeur working at Montgomery Mansion. Aside his job, he is also knowledgeable about horseback riding, training and helping Lynn at home to further improve her skills with Andrews.
Patricia (パトリシア, Patorishia)
Voiced by: Mariko Mukai
She is the maid working at Montgomery Mansion.
Jim Clark (ジム·クラーク, Jimu Kurāku)
Voiced by: Kouichi Hashimoto
Jim is the shaggy coach employed by the headmaster to teach horse riding at Saint Patrick Academy's both boys and girls equestrian clubs. Despite his looks, he is young and good at equestrian skills.
Barbara Merton (バルバラ·マートン, Barubara Mēton)
Voiced by: ?
Barbara is a skilled equestrian from another school and an acquaintance of Cathy. She first appeared on episode 14, as one of the observing spectators during Lynn and Cathy's preliminary competition for the Junior Grand Nationals. Like the two, Barbara is also competing for tournament together with her friends Betty and Anne.
Betty Grant (ベティ·グラント, Beti Guranto)
Voiced by: ?
Betty is the freckled blonde equestrian and a friend of Barbara and Anne. She is another competitor participating in the tournament finals.
Anne Caster (アンネ·キャスター, Anne Kyasutā)
Voiced by: ?
Anne is an equestrian from another school and a bespectacled friend of Barbara and Betty. Like her friends, she is also competing in the tournament finals.
Mary Waverley (メアリ·ウィバリー, Meari Wibarī)
Voiced by: Rihoko Nagao
Mary is the daughter of Magdalene Waverley and granddaughter of Victor Reynolds. She appeared on episode 22 and continued to the latter half of the series. Mary returned from Geneva, Switzerland and is enrolled at Saint Patrick Academy, after learning that Lynn is also studying there. She resented Lynn for ruining her mother's marriage arrangement three years ago and to become one of the nobility classes, and wants to take revenge by manipulating misfortunes that befall on her and use it to her advantage. She joined the tennis club, being a skilled tennis player. Like other girls in the academy, she also aiming for the Lady Crest. Though Vivian allied herself with her, Mary has other plans of her own. She will do anything to eliminate her rivals from obtaining the Lady Crest, even putting others in harm's way.
Victor Reynolds (ビクター·レイノルズ, Bikutā Reinoruzu)
Voiced by: Takeshi Aono
Victor is the president of one of Britain's largest companies. He is Magdalene's father and Thomas and Mary's grandfather, subtly he wants to buy the Marble Mansion after the arson fire it happened and he dislikes George because he refused to marry his daughter, which made her hating London along with Thomas.
Narrator
Voiced by: Reiko Mutō

== List of episodes ==
No.	Title	Original release date
1	"Cinderella of the Mews"; Transliteration: "Umagoya no Shinderera" (Japanese: 馬小屋のシンデレラ)	May 12, 1988
Sarah and her father George came to Montgomery Mansion to visit Lynn after three years. Meanwhile at St. Patrick Academy, Lynn is tending the horses at the stable when she was called by her friend Sara. They went together to see their captain, Vivian, as she maneuvers around the obstacle course with her horse Andrews. As they reached the final fence, a squirrel suddenly appeared in front of them and Andrews went to a panic, threw Vivian to the ground. Humiliated, Vivian lashed Andrews with a whip. Andrews went to a wild frenzy and escaped to the city. Lynn and Paul, who happens to pass by, went after Andrews. They managed to find Andrews at the entrance hall of a building. Lynn slowly approached the panic-stricken Andrews and managed to settle it down. As the people cheered, behind them, Vivian was infuriated by Lynn's heroic actions. After the incident, Lynn went home to the mansion and was delighted to her family - her elder sister Sarah and her father George, again. She told them her adventures earlier today, but as time passed Sarah and George have to go away and leave Lynn to Countess Montgomery's care. Lynn is hoping that one day they will be together again.
2	"Two Mysterious Meetings"; Transliteration: "Fushigi na deai ga Futatsu" (Japanese: ふしぎな出会いが2つ)	May 19, 1988
Sophie comes to stay at the Montgomery mansion. Her mother believes that Isabelle will leave her inheritance to Lynn and cut them out of their share. She told her daughter to make Lynn look bad. Isabelle buys Andrews from the school to give to Lynn.
3	"It's as Beautiful as the Wild Orchids"; Transliteration: "Yasē no Ran no yō ni Utsukushiku" (Japanese: 野生のランの様に美しく)	May 26, 1988
The principal is coming to visit and Sophie has a plan to place Lynn in danger so that Andrews will be taken away. When Lynn takes her to see Andrews, Sophie releases a squirrel on him. He goes crazy and runs away from the stable, dragging Lynn among with him. However, Lynn falls in a field of Wild Orchids. She grabs a handful since her great uncle used to give them to his wife. On the other hand, Sophie runs and tells the principal that Andrews has gone rogue and taken Lynn with him. Then Lynn shows up all bruised but with a bouquet of her aunt's favorite flowers.
4	"The Way to the Little Lady"; Transliteration: "Ritoru Redi e no Michi" (Japanese: リトルレディへの道)	June 2, 1988
5	"Event of the Green Pavilion"; Transliteration: "Midori no Yakata no Dekigoto" (Japanese: 緑の館の出来事)	June 9, 1988
6	"I'm Sorry, Sophie..."; Transliteration: "Gomen ne Sofi..." (Japanese: ごめんねソフィ...)	June 16, 1988
Lynn's grandfather is in the hospital so Isabelle leaves Lynn and Sophie at home. Dorothy comes over to tell Lynn about the new freshman who could already ride horses. Sophie tells her to leave since she will be ok by herself. Lynn goes to school to watch Cathy ride while Sophie pretends to run away to make Lynn look bad. Lynn and her friends look everywhere for Sophie. In the end, Leonard finds her. At home, when asked by Isabelle why she ran away, Sophie blames Lynn for leaving her alone. Isabelle is at first mad at Lynn but she forgives her.
7	"Andrews' Secret"; Transliteration: "Andoryūsu no Himitsu" (Japanese: アンドリュウスの秘密)	June 23, 1988
When Andrews gets frightened by a squirrel once again, Henry and Lynn go to Andrews' birthplace to find out why. They meet William who tell them that Andrews was scared by a squirrel on a muddy hill and almost fell to his death. However, Gloria, his mother, saved him but died herself. William's son Bobby hates Andrews for this reason but he knows that he is as great as his mother. So, he gives Gloria's cover to Lynn. When she gets home, she puts the cover around Andrews who starts to cry.
8	"The Day Lynn Rode on a Horse"; Transliteration: "Rin ga Uma ni Noreta hi" (Japanese: リンが馬に乗れた日)	June 30, 1988
Jim is introduced as the new teacher to the riding class. He takes them all to exercise and assess their skills. When the upperclassmen go running, a bee scares Vivian's horse and she runs off towards a cliff. Lynn rides Cathy's horse to save her and almost dies herself. Jim is impressed by Lynn's bravery.
9	"Tearful Birthday"; Transliteration: "Namida ni Nureta Tanjōbi" (Japanese: 涙にぬれた誕生日)	July 7, 1988
Sophie gets invited to Paul's birthday party because Lynn asks him to. At the party, everybody but her has no mother but they seem so happy. When she tearfully runs home, Lynn goes after her and lets her know that it must be hard on her since she has a mother but cannot see her. Sophie decides to be nicer to Lynn and be a compassionate Lady.
10	"Awakening to the Crest"; Transliteration: "Kuresuto e no Mezame" (Japanese: クレストへのめざめ)	July 14, 1988
Cathy comes over to see Andrews and commend Lynn for saving Elizabeth. She also wishes her good luck since they are both competing for the Lady Crest.
11	"My Rival is a Genius!?"; Transliteration: "Raibaru wa Tensai!?" (Japanese: ライバルは天才!?)	July 21, 1988
Lynn is asked to enter the competition with Andrews. Everybody is against the idea but Vivian agrees to it since she knows that Andrews is scared of jumping over hurdles now. Lynn is not confident she can learn so much in less than a week. Sophie, who is coming back from the hospital, sees Cathy riding. When she gets home, she tells Lynn that Cathy is practicing very hard and that if she practice too, she can make it.
12	"Goodbye Sophie"; Transliteration: "Sayonara ne Sofi" (Japanese: さよならねソフィ)	July 28, 1988
Sophie's mother comes over but Sophie is not happy to see her. Her mother tells her to cut Andrews' saddle so that Lynn falls off while riding him but she throws the knife in the lake and walks off. She accidentally falls in a ditch and twists her ankle. Her squirrel goes for help. He finds Lynn and signals for her to follow him. Sophie gets rescued and she wakes up in her bed. Sophie's mother accuses Lynn of causing her daughter's accident. Sophie defends Lynn and tells her mother that she hates her. Sophie's mother leaves and Sophie is sent back to France to live in a dorm. But she gives her ribbon to her squirrel.
13	"Please Fly!"; Transliteration: "Tonde! Onegai" (Japanese: 飛んで!おねがい)	August 4, 1988
Lynn tries to get Andrews to jump over a hurdle but he gets scared since he remembers Vivian's beating after he threw her off. For three days this goes on. Then Lynn talks to Andrews about how a Lady is brave. Andrews gets over his fear.
14	"Run! Towards the Dream"; Transliteration: "Hashire! Yume ni Mukatte" (Japanese: 走れ!夢に向かって)	August 11, 1988
Isabelle give Lynn a new riding outfit to wear to the tournament. Everybody comes out to cheer Lynn and Andrews on, but Andrews is still scared of Vivian. At the last hurdle, Vivian tries to scare Andrews but he jumps anyway. Nobody but Vivian, Cathy, and Lynn make it to the finish line.
15	"Lynn's Farewell and Departure"; Transliteration: "Wakare to Tabidachi no Rin" (Japanese: 別れと旅立ちのリン)	August 18, 1988
Sarah tries to read Lynn's good news to her grandfather but he does not want to hear it. The principal decides to move Andrews to the school stables. Vivian is happy since she can scare Andrews even more. Dorothy overhears Phyllis and Mathilda talking about their plan for Andrews and warns Lynn. She is sad to see Andrews go and sleeps in the stable.
16	"Hurry Up! To the Marble Mansion"; Transliteration: "Hayaku! Māburu-kan e" (Japanese: 早く!マーブル館へ)	August 25, 1988
Lynn has a wonderful dream about getting together with her family and friends, and her mother. She decides to visit her old home. George and Lynn visit the Marble Mansion but her Grandfather does not let Sarah go. Arthur visits Sarah and asks her what her dreams are. Sarah plays her flute while the grandfather thinks about what he said about Lynn.
17	"Watch Out! Edward"; Transliteration: "Abunai! Edowādo" (Japanese: 危ない!エドワード)	September 1, 1988
Edward is coming back to school but on his way, he sees a ? in a store window and decides to give it to Lynn. On the other hand, Arthur is reflecting back to the day when Lynn left Marble Mansion and decides to visit her too. Edward meet Lynn in Andrews' empty stable and tries to give her the ?. But, she is looking past him to another figure. She asks Edward if she is dreaming she is seeing Arthur. He says no and she goes running. Edward heads to school to practice riding while Arthur and Lynn catch up. He is so absorbed in his daydreams that he falls off his horse and breaks his leg. Philip picks Lynn up from school and takes her to the hospital. Vivian overhears and decides to go too. In Edward's room, Vivian accuses Lynn of causing Edward's accident since he was trying too hard to get into the Finals. Edward says that the sun was in his eyes. When everyone leaves, Arthur says that he knows there was no sun at night and that he was thinking of Lynn. He tells his brother to give Lynn the ? when he meets her next time.
18	"Lynn and Sarah's Promise"; Transliteration: "Rin to Sēra no Chikai" (Japanese: リンとセーラの誓い)	September 8, 1988
Lynn goes early to school but Louie beats her there. Mathilda and Phyllis yell at her for bringing animals to school. Mathilda forgets her badge her father once gave her at the race track but Jim hands it to her. When Lynn gets home, Sarah is there to welcome her. She asks Lynn if she remembered the day they made a promise to be Ladies under a strong tree. They renew their promise and Lynn realizes that Sarah loves Arthur. Paul comes and tells Lynn that her horse went missing. She bikes to the stables and only find Gloria's blanket. On the other hand, Sarah and Henry follow Louie to Andrews and take him back to the school stables. Andrews remember that Mathilda took off her blanket and dropped her father's badge in his stall. Cathy notices the badge and Mathilda says that she dropped it in the morning. Sarah leaves.
19	"Mother is Still Within my Heart"; Transliteration: "Chiisana Mune ni wa Mama ga" (Japanese: 小さな胸にはママが)	September 15, 1988
Lynn and Paul are at the stable brushing Andrews when Sophie shows up. She tells them that Isabelle had her transferred to the town's school. She also apologizes to Paul for messing up his birthday. At Isabelle's home, they have a wonderful time and everyone notices the difference in Sophie. In Lynn's bedroom, Sophie wishes that her mother was like Lynn's. Her mother called sometimes and only saw her at special occasions and had given her the doll on her 5th birthday. when Lynn steps out to water her dog, Sophie's mother calls to talk to Isabelle. After breakfast, Isabelle tells the two girls to get ready and go with Henry for a surprise. They end up on Turner's farm, where Bobby introduces Sophie to her mother's gift, Florence whose mother was Gloria's sister. They both think it was from Isabelle but when Sophie runs to the road, she finds her mother getting in the car. She doesn't believe it but Lynn pushes her to go make up with her mother. They leave together and Lynn hopes that one day, she and her grandfather make up too.
20	"Wedding of Happiness"; Transliteration: "Shiawase no Wedingu" (Japanese: 幸せのウェディング)	September 22, 1988
Lynn has a wonderful dream in which Edward was driving a carriage and Arthur is riding with her to a castle. She gets up and races Cathy in school. Cathy wins. Elizabeth gets scared of the fierce wind. Vivian tells Lynn to search for a suitable meadow for her horse. Lynn and her two friends find Paul and he invites them to Peggy's wedding to another man. Paul tells both Peggy and Eric separately that Lynn wants to see them. When they meet at the bridge at 4 pm, they just stare at the water. Paul and the 3 girls look from afar and he gets frustrated. he runs up to the bridge and tells his brother to say something to Peggy. He doesn't and get leaves. Lynn asks Peggy why she wouldn't marry Eric but she tells her not to ask her that. At the store, Peggy tells her father that she doesn't want to marry the man she doesn't love. Peggy's father tells his daughter that she is marrying a son of his good friend and to forget about Eric since he has two siblings to worry about. Just then, the three girls and Paul walk in and try to make the old man change his mind about Eric. He tells them to leave and Eric walks in and takes them with him. he tells them that there are things in life they don't understand. On the other hand, Peggy is distraught and her mother comforts her. Lynn looks at a wedding magazine and makes up fake invitations to Eric and Peggy's wedding. Peggy's father is furious but her mother tells her to marry whom she loves. Eric comes by and convinces the father but he is convinced when Isabelle calls about Eric's love for Peggy. He finally says yes and they get married.
21	"Why!? This Sudden Grief"; Transliteration: "Naze!? Totsuzen no Kanashimi ga" (Japanese: なぜ!?突然の悲しみが)	September 29, 1988
George and Sarah are coming to visit Lynn. Lynn practices with Andrews while Jim watch and then he tells the principal that she is getting better day by day. Sarah and her grandfather are visited by George and he tells them that he got his house back. Sarah leaves with George and they are both positive that soon Grandfather will recognize Lynn. On the other hand, Jim tells Vivian, Cathy and Lynn to be ready in 10 days. Vivian invites Cathy but she says that Lynn needs tips and advice more than she does and that she is not coming over for dinner unless Lynn goes with her. She concedes angrily. Cathy and Lynn decide to fight fairly for the Lady Crest and wish each other luck. George and Sarah visit her in school and watch her practice. Lynn is told that the manor is back. At night, George gets a call that his warehouses are on fire and he leaves.
22	"The Uninvited Transfer Student"; Transliteration: "Manekare-zaru Tenkōsei" (Japanese: 招かれざる転校生)	October 6, 1988
Sarah leaves to stay with her grandfather and Lynn is not told about her father's loss. Edward is getting out of the hospital. He and Arthur meet Lynn at the entrance and she tells them that she is moving back to Marble Mansion. She and Arthur leave and pass Mary in a car, who just arrived from the airport. Arthur and Mary notice each other and he worries that she is going to bully Lynn again. Mary visits her grandfather at the bank and he tells her that he plans on buying the marble home from the bank for her. He hates George since baroness and Thomas hate London because of him. Mary tells her grandfather to get her enrolled in St. Paul Academy. She goes to live in Vivian's home since her father also works at the bank. The next day when Mary and Vivian admire Elizabeth, Lynn greets them. When Vivian asks how Mary knows Lynn, she says that she is the daughter of a poor viscount. Vivian realizes that they are not friends and decide to make Mary her friend.
23	"Why, Arthur!?"; Transliteration: "Nazenano Āsā!?" (Japanese: なぜなのアーサー!?)	October 13, 1988
Mary is throwing a party and invites Lynn to Vivian's anger. She says that she has an idea and also invites Arthur and Edward. Mary impresses the school with her tennis skills and invites Lynn to the party. Edward and Arthur also gets invited but only Arthur decides to go since Mary says that she will tell Arthur something. She tells him that George's stuff was all burned so the bank will take the mansion back. Arthur agrees to go with her as her date. At the party Lynn is upset to find that Arthur is with Mary. Edward gets a phone call from Philip telling him that Vivian told him to come and that Arthur is here with Mary. He gets mad and comes to the party and hits Arthur.
24	"The Secret Race at Daybreak"; Transliteration: "Yoake no Himitsu Rēsu" (Japanese: 夜明けの秘密レース)	October 20, 1988
Mary calls Lynn at the tower and tells her about her father's arson fire. She promises to talk to her grandfather if Lynn competes with Vivian. Lynn and Vivian race at daybreak. Isabelle, Jim, principal, Jim, Eric, Peggy, and Philip show up. Lynn's strap breaks since Mary cuts it. Vivian is distracted by the sun when Edward appears. Both tie and then she falls.
25	"Forgive Me, Everyone..."; Transliteration: "Minna, Yurushite..." (Japanese: みんな、許して...)	October 27, 1988
Lynn is told to stay at home by the principal until they sort out the truth. Jim tries to quit but the principal tells him to wait until they talk to both Vivian and Lynn. Philip is suspicious of Mary since she called him about the race and tries to talk to her. Phyllis and Mathilda blame Lynn and show Dorothy and Sarah the cut strap. Cathy looks and says that it has been cut and shows it to Philip. Mary's grandfather is determined to get the mansion to get back at George. Cathy watches Mary and overhears her talking about ?. Cathy tells Philip but they have no proof. At home Edward sneaks in while Patricia takes Isabelle out. He realizes that Mary forced Lynn to race after he sees the news about her father's wares. He confronts Vivian in the hospital and tells her to tell the truth. She goes to the principal and then to Lynn's home to return her newspaper. Lynn is back at the school.
26	"Lynn's Dream, Lynn's Crisis"; Transliteration: "Rin no Yume, Rin no Kiki" (Japanese: リンの夢 リンの危機)	November 3, 1988
Mary moves to her grandfather's. Lynn and Cathy's horses are being taken to the champs. Cathy asks Lynn why she is keeping secrets from her. Lynn asks Mary if she has talked to her grandfather and she lies. At the champs, the judge tells people say if they pass the first track, they move on to the next one. They try the first track and then meet the red head girl, Barbara, and her friends Betty and Ann. They race at the second track but Cathy's horse comes last since it is scared of other horses. Arthur comes to visit while Mary's second goal is him. Arthur tells Sarah to believe in her father. Vivian asks Cathy to ride Elizabeth and Philip is surprised at her change. Thomas and Barones visit and Mary tells them about Marble Mansion.
27	"The Marble Mansion before the Storm"; Transliteration: "Arashi no Mae no Māburu-kan" (Japanese: 嵐の前のマーブル館)	November 10, 1988
Lynn is exercising. Isabelle is worried that in 16 days, the mansion will be repossessed. When Lynn asks Mary if she had talked to her grandfather, she scolds her and says that she has champs to worry about. Lynn paints her 100-year-old tree and looks back at her old times and the promise. Cathy finds Elizabeth is wonderful. Vivian comes and watches them and tells Mathilda and Phyllis to be nice to both girls. Edward watches Lynn practice with Philip but decides not to see her. He meets Mary from her practice with Suzie and asks her what she is doing with Lynn. She tells Edward to invite Arthur to her tennis champ. When Edward says that Arthur is not interested, she says he will be. Edward meets with his brother and asks him why he is going out with Mary. He tells him about Mary not telling Lynn in return for her silence. They will do this for Lynn. the Duke visits his son and tells him that Reynolds is after his mansion and George will never give up or lose. Sarah visits her father. Edward calls Lynn to let her know that he made up with his brother. Lynn finishes her painting of Marble Mansion.
28	"Mary's Last Plot"; Transliteration: "Meari Saigo no Takurami" (Japanese: メアリ最後の企み)	November 17, 1988
Mary goes to the tennis champs while Lynn goes to school. While cleaning her room, Patricia finds the news story on George's ares. Isabelle finds out that Lynn knew about her father's loss. Mary meets her match but she is determined to win. Lynn messes up her practice and everyone notices. Mary comes in second and cannot get the crest. Vivian thinks that Mary cut Lynn's strap when they were racing. She tells Philip to tell Edward to watch out for Lynn. Sophie comes to visit for her birthday. Isabelle tells Lynn that her father will do everything for them and not worry. Isabelle decides to throw a party for Sophie. Mary blames Lynn for her second place. Her grandfather Reynolds yells at George on the phone that Mary and her family will get the mansion and not Lynn. Mary meet Lynn at the lake and tells her that she did everything for her but there was a problem. She come in second so her grandfather was upset. So she gives her a choice, mansion or Lady Crest. Sophie hears all.
29	"The Dream of the Vanishing Crest"; Transliteration: "Kieru Kuresuto no Yume" (Japanese: 消えるクレストの夢)	November 24, 1988
Sophie asks Lynn not tell her everything. She tells her but she cannot decide. Sophie almost tells Isabelle but Lynn drags her to get her dressed. Isabelle notices them acting strange. Sarah waits for Arthur and Edward and asks her grandfather to go with her. Arthur notices her happy and she says that parties make her happy. Edward says that Lynn will be fine and will win the champs. Paul, Nancy, Dorothy, Sara, Vivian, Mathilda, Phyllis, Cathy, Jim, and Philip come to the party too. Lynn worries that she will cry at the party. When Lynn does not show up at the party, Isabelle, Sophie, Edward, Arthur and Sarah go to her room. Her dress is there. Sophie breaks down and tells all. Everyone is furious and Edward goes to find Lynn. Vivian knows something is up since Lynn and Edward are both missing. Lynn goes to her home and think about her two dreams. She realizes that mansion is also Sarah and George's dream so she gives up on the crest. Edward tells her that she is not selfish. But she wants happiness from George and Sarah. She tells her friends that she will give up her dream. Edward decides that Lynn should go for the crest and asks Vivian to ask her bank president father to loan George the money since his is the only child, he will listen. She asks her father but he says impossible and tells her she is a child. Sophie leaves with Louie. She thanks Lynn for giving her the gift of courage and selflessness.
30	"There is much Unhappiness in the Heart"; Transliteration: "Mune Ippai no Kanashimi" (Japanese: 胸いっぱいの悲しみ)	December 1, 1988
Grandfather looks at an unhappy Lynn, who is thinking of the champs 3 days away. He comes to Isabelle to take Sarah but she wants to stay because she is worried about Lynn. She tells her grandfather about the situation. He lets her stay and tells Isabelle to take care of Lynn. People at school wish Lynn luck with the champs. Viv overhears Mary asking Suzie where Lynn is and follows her. Lynn tells Mary that she will give up on the crest in return for her help. Viv overheas. Viv tells Lynn to practice well because she knows all. She tells her to leave everything for her and give her a day. Lynn performed badly at her practice and Cathy hands over the cut strap to Viv. Viv visits Mary and threatens to tell the principal, and tells her that Cathy saw her cut the strap. She makes Mary promise not to get in Lynn's way. Mary calls her grandfather and he calls Spencer and gets Viv in trouble. Spencer hears out his daughter. She tells him that Lynn and Andrews will win the champs. But she tells him that she has a good heart and will lose the champs for her family. Cathy and Philip come and she tells her uncle to help courageous Lynn. Spencer is surprised that his daughter is being so selfless.
31	"The Symphony of Love"; Transliteration: "Ai no Shinfonī" (Japanese: 愛のシンフォニー)	December 8, 1988
Lynn and Cathy race and Spencer watches them. Sarah gets a call from Arthur, who tells her that her father is on his way from Boston. Cathy tells her riding class and Philip and they all want to help. Viv tells Lynn to do her best since her father will help. Mary cries to her grandfather that everyone is helping Lynn and she cannot stand it since she drove her family out from the mansion. Just then Spencer comes in and Mary runs out. He tells him that Lynn is truthful and that Mary told Lynn that she will talk to her grandfather about helping George if she gives up the champs. He tells him that Mary did not say. Edward walks in and points out that her classmates are there. They look out to see them holding up signs in favor of Lynn. Spencer reminds him of his time with rugby. He agrees but with one condition. Lynn must win. Lynn comes home to her father and Arthur and Edward and Vivian come to tell her what happened. Her father and Sarah wishes her luck. Mary tries going home but her grandfather force her to go to see the race. Peggy, Nancy, Eric, Paul, Bobby, William, Patricia, Henry, Isabelle, Sarah, George, and Duke Warbawn come to see Lynn race and the pets. Sophie and her mother, Cathy, Ann, and Barbara make it.
32	"There is a Rainbow over Tears"; Transliteration: "Namida no Mukō ni wa Niji ga" (Japanese: 涙のむこうには虹が)	December 15, 1988
Lynn passes the first round and everyone goes to the other stadium. Victor talks to Lynn about her home and asks her if she is scared. Lynn says that her dream will not come true if she give in to fright. She meets with her teacher and Viv. Isabelle tries softening her brother about Lynn and he sort of agrees that she has contributed much to the family. they race. Lynn starts coming in fourth. She comes in first and everyone cheers. Duke finally accepts Lynn as a granddaughter. Lynn also wins the crest. Sarah and her father come to take her to the mansion. Her father gives her a treasure chest to open with Lady's key. There is a crown inside. She dreams about her wearing the crown.
33	"Gentle, Strong and Beautiful"; Transliteration: "Yasashiku Tsuyoku Utsukushiku" (Japanese: やさしく強く美しく)	December 22, 1988
34	"Lynn Looks Forward to the Wind"; Transliteration: "Rin wa Kaze ni Mukatte" (Japanese: リンは風に向かって)	December 29, 1988
35	"The Trio of Sadness"; Transliteration: "Kanashimi no Sanjūsō" (Japanese: 悲しみの三重奏)	January 19, 1989
36	"Farewell, Sadness"; Transliteration: "Kanashimi yo Sayōnara" (Japanese: 悲しみよサヨウナラ)	January 26, 1989

== Music ==
Opening Theme

- "Lady Crest ~Opening the Door~" (レディ·クレスト〜扉を開けて〜, Redi Kuresuto ~Tobira o Akete~)
  Lyrics by Mitsuko Shiramine
  Composition by Ryo Matsuda
  Arrangement by Keiichi Oku
  Performed by Kaori Moritani
  Courtesy of Columbia Records

Ending Theme

- "Portrait of Wild Roses" (野ばらの肖像, Nobara no Shouzou)
  Lyrics by Mitsuko Shiramine
  Composition by Masae Nanbu
  Arrangement by Keiichi Oku
  Performed by Kaori Moritani
  Courtesy of Columbia Records

== Staff ==
- Director: Hiroshi Shidara
- Producer: Kazuo Yokoyama, Hiromi Seki
- Episode Director: Toshihiko Arisako, Yasuo Yamayoshi
- Character Design: Kazuhiro Ochi
- Art Design: Takao Sawada
- Storyline: Tomoko Konparu
- Planning: Hiromi Seki, Kazuo Yokoyama
- Production Manager: Yoshiro Sugawara
- Music: Kōhei Tanaka
- Production Company: Toei Animation Co., Ltd., Toei Advertising, Ltd.
