= Candy Candy =

Japanese manga, anime, and novel

- The first volume of Candy Candy, featuring Candy on the cover

キャンディ・キャンディ♡ (Kyandi Kyandi)
- Manga
- Written by: Kyoko Mizuki
- Illustrated by: Yumiko Igarashi
- Published by: Kodansha
- Magazine: Nakayoshi
- Original run: April 1975 – March 1979
- Volumes: 9
- Anime television series
- Directed by: Hiroshi Shidara; Tetsuo Imazawa
- Produced by: Kanetake Ochiai; Shinichi Miyazaki; Yuyake Usui
- Written by: Noboru Shiroyama; Shun'ichi Yukimuro
- Music by: Takeo Watanabe
- Studio: Toei Animation
- Original network: ANN (TV Asahi)
- Original run: 1 October 1976 – 2 February 1979
- Episodes: 115
- Anime film

Candy Candy: The Call of Spring/The May Festival
- Directed by: Yoshikatsu Kasai
- Written by: Noboru Shiroyama
- Music by: Takeo Watanabe
- Studio: Toei Animation
- Released: 18 March 1978
- Runtime: 25 minutes
- Novel
- Written by: Kyoko Mizuki
- Published: May 1978 – April 1979
- Anime film

Candy Candy's Summer Vacation
- Directed by: Yoshikatsu Kasai
- Produced by: Chiaki Imada
- Music by: Takeo Watanabe
- Studio: Toei Animation
- Released: 22 July 1978
- Runtime: 15 minutes
- Anime film

Candy Candy the Movie
- Directed by: Tetsuo Imazawa
- Produced by: Chiaki Imada
- Music by: Takeo Watanabe
- Studio: Toei Animation
- Released: 25 April 1992
- Runtime: 26 minutes

Candy Candy (キャンディ・キャンディ, Kyandi Kyandi) is a Japanese anime created by Japanese writer Keiko Nagita under the pen name Kyoko Mizuki. It was published as a manga in April 1975 written by Mizuki and illustrated by Yumiko Igarashi, a collaboration which was put together by the Japanese magazine Nakayoshi. The manga series ran for four years, and won the 1st Kodansha Manga Award for shōjo in 1977. The story was adapted into an anime series by Toei Animation. There are also three animated short films. In addition, a three-volume novel was published between 1978 and 1979.

To create the story of Candy Candy, its author, Keiko Nagita, drew primary inspiration from novels such as Jean Webster's Daddy Long Legs and Lucy Maud Montgomery's Anne of Green Gables, seeking to explore the trope of the optimistic, cheerful orphan protagonist who faces life head-on and moves forward.

In Candy's Secret Revealed!—an interview for the Keizensha Encyclopedia—Nagita says: "I decided to write a story that was neither merely a magical manga nor a conventional tale of an orphan girl searching for her mother, but rather the life of a girl who lives looking toward the future; within that life, I wanted to include three loves. The first is the initial love with Anthony—a fleeting romance, a love composed solely of tenderness with a boy of a special, pure transparency. Then comes the turbulent, youthful love with Terry—a love one must part from, even while still in love. And finally, I wrote of a serene, mature, fated, and enduring love with Albert."

== Plot ==
The story follows Candice "Candy" White, an orphan abandoned at Pony's Home. After a childhood filled with ups and downs and the loss of her first loves (Anthony and Terry), Candy trains to become a nurse. After overcoming numerous obstacles, she discovers that the enigmatic Albert is actually her protector and the childhood crush to whom she was bound by the red thread of fate.

=== Origins and the Prince of the Hill ===
The story begins in the early 20th century. Candy and her best friend, Annie, grow up together at Pony's Home, an orphanage near Lake Michigan. When Annie is adopted by a wealthy family, Candy is left heartbroken and weeps on a hill covered in daffodils; there, she meets a mysterious Scottish boy who tells her, "You look more beautiful when you laugh than when you cry!" As he quickly leaves, the young man drops a happiness talisman, which Candy keeps as proof that "her prince hadn't been a dream." She calls him the "Prince of the Hill"—a figure who will shape the destiny of the entire story.

=== Life with the Ardlays ===
Years later, Candy is hired as a maid and playmate for the spoiled Leagan siblings. After being falsely accused of theft, she is adopted by the Ardlay family under the legal guardianship of the Ardlay Clan Patriarch, whose identity remains a secret until the end of the story. Candy moves into the family mansion, where she meets the brothers Archie and Stear, and—above all—Anthony Brown, a young rose enthusiast who bears a striking resemblance to her "Prince of the Hill" and is the Patriarch's only nephew. Candy and Anthony fall in love, but their happiness is cut short when he dies tragically after falling from a horse during a hunt.

=== St. Paul's School ===
To help them move past their grief, the young people are sent to study at the Royal St. Paul's School in England. There, Candy meets the rebellious and sarcastic Terry Grandchester, an aggressive young man with family issues. Although they clash at first, they eventually fall in love. Due to the schemes of her lifelong enemy, Eliza Leagan, Candy and Terry are separated. Terry decides to leave the school to pursue his dream of becoming an actor. Some time later, Candy also travels to the United States, hoping to reunite with Terry.

=== Nursing and World War I ===
In the United States, Candy's life takes a drastic turn with the outbreak of World War I. She decides to become a nurse and moves to Chicago to study and care for the wounded. During this time, she reunites with Albert, a kind-hearted soul who had once saved her life and shared a special bond with animals. At that moment, Albert was suffering from amnesia, and Candy decided to live with him at Magnolia House. Meanwhile, Terry becomes a stage actor in New York and becomes involved with his co-star, Susanna Marlowe, who had sacrificed her leg to save him from an accident. Candy and Terry cross paths again, but he chooses Susanna over her and bids Candy a final farewell—a moment that leaves Candy deeply saddened. Albert comforts Candy during her grief and protects her from harm. After three years, Albert decides to leave because they were living together unmarried, and neighbors had begun to tarnish Candy's reputation. Realizing just how important and indispensable Albert is to her, Candy becomes desperate and begins searching for him everywhere. During this search, she runs into Terry by chance; however, finding Albert is her only priority, so she turns Terry away, and he returns to Susanna.

=== Resolution and Ending ===
After many farewells and losses, Candy returns to her roots at Pony's Home to dedicate herself to helping those in need. It is there that Candy happily reunites with Albert, and the story's great mystery is finally revealed: Albert turns out to be none other than the Patriarch of the Ardlay Clan—Candy's mysterious legal guardian—whose full name is William Albert Ardlay. Furthermore, Albert confesses to Candy that he is the "Prince of the Hill" she met in her childhood and never forgot—the owner of her talisman of happiness. Candy runs happily into Albert's arms, and he becomes her true and destined love.

== Media ==
=== Manga ===
The Candy Candy manga was announced in the March 1975 issue of Nakayoshi. The first chapter was published in the following month, and continued until the last chapter in March 1979. The story, however, did not appear in the November 1975, December 1976, as well as January-June 1978 issues. The manga was published in nine volumes.

==== Volumes ====
- 1 (2 October 1975)
- 2 (8 March 1976)
- 3 (8 August 1976)
- 4 (8 December 1976)
- 5 (18 March 1977)
- 6 (18 September 1977)
- 7 (18 April 1978)
- 8 (18 November 1978)
- 9 (19 March 1979)

=== Anime ===
The anime adaptation of Candy Candy, produced by Toei Animation, began airing on TV Asahi a year and a half after the start of the original manga. It ran concurrently with the manga from October 1, 1976, to February 2, 1979. It was broadcast from 7:00 to 7:30 p.m. and lasted 115 episodes. The final episode aired the day before the last chapter of the manga was published in Nakayoshi.

There are three animated theatrical short films: Candy Candy: The Call of Spring/The May Festival (1978), Candy Candy's Summer Vacation (1978) and Candy Candy the Movie (1992). In addition, episode 29, "Setting out on a Voyage Towards Hope", was screened in theaters in a blow-up format during the Toei Manga Matsuri in July 1977.

=== Novel ===
Kyoko Mizuki's Candy Candy novel, consisting of three volumes published between May 1978 and April 1979, has piqued the interest of Candy Candy fans outside Japan for some years. This novel was only available in Japan and published in Japanese. The third volume covers the period after the events chronicled in the manga and anime. The novels have been translated in their entirety by Western fans but the translations confirmed that, true to her artistic form, Kyoko Mizuki did not provide concrete closure to the story, yet in the last letter that closed out the novel, Candy was still an optimistic, life-loving and cheerful heroine. In 2010, Keiko Nagita published "Candy Candy Final Story"—her final novel adaptation of her original work—in which it becomes evident once again that Albert is Candy's ultimate romantic love.

=== Live-action ===
==== Film ====
In 1981, a Korean drama/family live action film based on the series was produced by Choi Chu-ji, directed by Choi In-hyeon, and written by Man Izawa. Choi Shin-hee starred, alongside Kim Do-hee, Eom Hyo-jeong Eom, Song Bo-geun, and Yoo Eun-suk. Due to licensing issues, the film was only released domestically.

==== Cast ====
- Minori Matsushima as Candice "Candy" White Ardlay
- Makio Inoue as William Albert Ardlay, Candy's husband
- Kazuhiko Inoue as Anthony Brown, Candy's first love interest
- Ryo Horikawa as Anthony Brown (1992 film)
- Kei Tomiyama as Terrence "Terrius/Terry" Graham Granchester, Candy's second love interest
- Kaneta Kimotsuki as Alistair "Stear" Cornwell
- Yūji Mitsuya as Archibald "Archie" Cornwell
- Mami Koyama as Annie Brighton
- Yumi Touma as Annie Brighton (1992 film)
- Chiyoko Kawashima as Patricia "Patty" O'Brien
- Yumi Nakatani as Eliza Leagan
- Eiko Hisamura as Eliza Leagan (1992 film)
- Kiyoshi Komiyama as Neil Leagan
- Ryuusei Nakao as Neil Leagan (1992 film)
- Taeko Nakanishi as Sister Pony, Grandaunt Elory and Narrator
- Nana Yamaguchi as Sister Lane, Mrs. Leagan and Sister Gray
- Miyoko Aso as Mary Jane Headmistress
- Sachiko Chijimatsu as Jimmy
- Eken Mine as Garcia
- Koko Kagawa as Susanna Marlowe

==== TV series ====
An Indonesian television series adaptation titled Candy was produced by Sinemart. It was produced by Leo Sutanto and directed by Widi Wijaya and aired on channel RCTI in 2007, starring Rachel Amanda, Nimaz Dewantary, Lucky Perdana, and Bobby Joseph.

== Releases ==
From 1980s to early 1990s, VHS within Japan and the rest of the world were being serialized and distributed under the approval of Toei Animation.

List of Candy Candy VHS released in Japan
Name	Episodes	Extras	Catalog
Candy Candy Vol. 1	1, 5, 12	Previews of 2, 3 and 4 + Call of Spring advertisement	TE-M884
Candy Candy Vol. 2	22, 23, 24	Previews of 25, 26, 27 (27 is not on the third vol. VHS)	TE-M262
Candy Candy Vol. 3	25, 26, 29	Unknown	VRTM-00643
Candy Candy Vol. 4	30, 31, 32	Unknown	VRTM-00106
Candy Candy Vol. 5	36, 37, 38	Unknown	VRTM-00818
Candy Candy Vol. 6	39, 40, 41	Unknown	VRTM-00800
Candy Candy Vol. 7	42, 43, 44	Unknown	VRTM-00311
Candy Candy Vol. 8	45, 46, 47	Unknown	VRTM-00707
Candy Candy Original Movie: Call of Spring (OVA 1); Candy Candy no Natsuyasumi (OVA 2)	OVA 1, OVA 2	Toei Otoshidama Manga Matsuri	TE-M156
Million Seller Series Candy Candy: A Small Ribbon Connecting Hearts	11	Unknown	TE-M437
Candy Candy New Movie	OVA 3	Karaoke of the opening theme	VHS VRTM-01308; LD LSTD-01050

== Legal issues ==
In the early 1990s, co-creators Mizuki and Igarashi, along with Toei Animation, battled over the legal ownership of the title. Igarashi was producing Candy Candy material without the consent of Mizuki or Toei. In 1998, Mizuki brought her case to a Tokyo district court to prove that she had equal rights of ownership of the Candy Candy title. In October 2001, the court ruled the case in favor of Mizuki and ordered Igarashi and five companies that distributed the unauthorized merchandise to pay Mizuki ¥29,500,000, or 3% of their sales. In June 2002, Igarashi sued Toei to enforce her rights on the Candy Candy trademark, forcing broadcasters to stop airing the series.

In September 2003, a toy manufacturer based in Misato, Saitama sued the two copyright managers of Candy Candy for ¥11 million for loss of revenue due to legal battle between Mizuki and Igarashi. The manufacturer was commissioned by the copyright managers to produce Candy Candy jigsaw puzzles without being informed that they could be immediately dismissed by Mizuki any time for copyright infringement. The Tokyo high court ordered the copyright managers to pay ¥7.8 million to the toy company.

== Legacy ==
Roll from Megaman was originally visually inspired by Candy Candy, although the design was later changed.
