= Mann Izawa =

Japanese screenwriter and novelist

Mitsuru Izawa (井澤 満, Izawa Mitsuru; born August 6, 1945), better known as Mann Izawa (井沢 満, Izawa Man), is a Japanese screenwriter and novelist.

In 1991, he won the Ministry of Education, Culture, Sports, Science and Technology's Newcomer Award for his writing on the medical drama series Gekai Arimori Saeko (外科医有森冴子). His gay-themed drama series Dōsōkai (同窓会), which aired on prime-time television in 1993, is considered a pioneering work for its depiction of gay relationships.

Izawa also wrote several manga series that were illustrated by Yumiko Igarashi in the 1980s, including Georgie!, which was adapted into an anime series; Twinkle Star 2 (ティンクル・スター2); and Boku no Brassiere Island (ぼくのブラジャー♡アイランド). In the late 1990s, he was involved in a legal dispute with Igarashi over merchandising rights to Georgie!
