= Kaori Moritani =

- Also known as: Wanku
- Born: July 26, 1969 (age 55)
- Origin: Inuyama, Aichi, Japan
- Genres: Pop
- Occupation: Singer
- Years active: 1986–1997, 2008–2011
- Labels: Healing World

Kaori Moritani (守谷 香, Moritani Kaori, born July 26, 1969), also known as Wanku (わんくぅ), is a Japanese singer from Aichi Prefecture, Japan. She retired after marrying in 1997, but resumed activities in 2008 for the record label Healing World.

In 1993, she played Ophelia in a musical adaptation of Hamlet. Four years later on February 17, 1997, she married her Hamlet co-star Toshi, lead singer of the heavy metal band X Japan. Toshi filed for divorce in February 2010, saying that for the past ten years they "effectively have not been husband and wife." He also claimed that for the same duration she has been living with Tōru Kurabuchi (倉渕透), better known as "Masaya", the leader of a self-help organization called Home of Heart and her label Healing World.

== Discography ==
=== Albums ===
- [1987.07.21] Chizu no Nai Machi (地図のない街)
- [2003.12.03] Moritani Kaori Best (守谷香ベスト)
- [2009.07.31] Kirei na Heart (きれいなハート)

=== Singles ===
- [1987.05.27] Yokokuhen (予告編)
- [1987.10.21] Ano Sora wa Natsu no Naka (あの空は夏の中)
- [1988.04.21] Oyomesan ni Natte Agenaizo (お嫁さんになってあげないゾ)
  Opening theme song for the anime Kiteretsu Daihyakka
- [1988.05.21] Lady Crest: Tobira o Akete (レディ・クレスト ～扉を開けて～)
  Opening theme song for the anime Hello! Lady Lynn, coupled with Nobara no Shōzō (野ばらの肖像) as its ending theme.
- [1988.08.21] Kaze ni Mukatte
- [1988.10.01] Shitsurenza (失恋座)
- [1989.02.01] Kanashii no Hako Maru no (悲しいのはこまるの)
- [1989.06.21] Try Love Again

=== Duet participation with Toshi ===
- (2008.09.30) Toshi Toshi Duet I Towa ni Tabi Suru Koto
- (2009.03.25) Toshi & Wanku – Daichi o Shizumete (大地をしずめて)
- (2009.08.13) Toshi Itsumademo
- (2009.09.11) Toshi Arigato no uta
