= Ikuko Nagai =

Japanese singer

- 永井 郁子
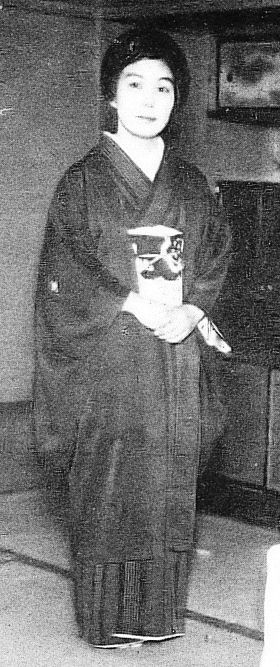
- Nagai, from a 1929 publication
- Born: 30 August 1893
- Died: 28 January 1983 (aged 89)
- Occupation: Singer

Ikuko Nagai (30 August 1893 – 28 January 1983; in Japanese: 永井 郁子), was a Japanese soprano concert singer. She dedicated much of her performing career to promoting the works of Japanese composers and songwriters, and gave a thousand recitals of Japanese art songs between 1925 and 1941.

== Biography ==
Nagai studied music with Hanka Petzold, a Norwegian singer and vocal coach who was based in Tokyo.

Nagai, a soprano, sang selections from Carmen with the Tokyo Philharmonic Society in 1914. She announced in November 1925 that she would give a thousand recitals of art songs in Japanese, either by Japanese composers or translated by Japanese writers, accompanied on shamisen. She gave the 1000th promised recital in 1941, then retired. She also made recordings of the music she promoted, including duets with fellow singers Ayako Ogino and Chiyako Sato. She toured in Taiwan five times while it was occupied by the Japanese, in 1928, 1930, 1933, 1936, and 1937.

Nagai died in 1983, at the age of 89.
