= Mimi (magazine) =

Japanese manga magazine

- Cover of the 22/1985 issue of Mimi
- Categories: Shōjo manga
- Frequency: Monthly (1975–83, 1992–96); Semimonthly (1983–91)
- First issue: August 1975
- Final issue: December 1996
- Company: Kodansha
- Country: Japan
- Based in: Tokyo
- Language: Japanese

Mimi (Japanese: ミミ), stylized as mimi, was a Japanese shōjo manga magazine. It was published in a monthly and partially semimonthly rhythm between August 1975 and December 1996 by Kodansha. It was one of the first manga magazines targeted at an audience of girls in their late teens. The magazine was best known for publishing Waki Yamato's The Tale of Genji.

== History ==
The magazine was founded in August 1975. At this time, shōjo manga was undergoing a transformation, with a new generation of women around the Year 24 Group and others pioneering new visual and narrative forms. Mimi was one of the first manga magazines targeted at an audience of girls in their late teens and young women, founded before Bouquet (1978) and Petit Flower (1980). The catchphrase written on the cover of its first issue was "to you, just in the spring of life", referring to its target group of readers who had read manga already in elementary school or junior high school and had now grown older.

In its first years, the magazine was specialized in publishing short stories. Some of its early contributors were Machiko Satonaka, Shinji Wada, Suzue Miuchi, Yōko Shōji, Makiko Hirata as well as two members of the Year 24 Group, Minori Kimura and Toshie Kihara. In the late 1970s, first series started to appear.

In 1983, the magazine's rhythm was changed from monthly to semimonthly. With the March 1992 issue, the rhythm was changed back to monthly. The magazine was released on the 28th of each month.

Kodansha described the magazine in 1996 as a magazine for young adult women, adding that trendy single women around the age of 20 were the core audience. In the 1990s, most of its editors were young women in their 20s themselves.

Four magazines were published as supplementary magazines of Mimi. Mimi DX existed from 1979 until 1987, Mimi Excellent (mimiエクセレント) from 1985 until 1993 and Mimi Carnival (mimiカーニバル) from 1987 until 1997. The fourth supplementary magazine Kiss was founded in 1992. Tankōbon of manga published in Mimi and its supplementary magazines were released under the imprint Mimi KC.

The last issue was the February 1997 issue released in December 1996. The editorial team of Mimi switched to being in charge of its successor, its former supplementary magazine Kiss and also some of its artists worked for KIss after Mimi's closure. Kiss Carnival was started in 1997 as a successor to Mimi Carnival.

== Legacy ==
Mimi as one of the first magazines for girls in their late teens and young women is credited with influencing a genre known as "young ladies". Young ladies was introduced to denote an intermediate category between shōjo manga for girls and josei manga for adult women, when magazines like Young You, Young Rose and Feel Young appeared in the late 1980s and early 1990s.

The magazine published several critically acclaimed or commercially successful manga. The best known title of the magazine is Waki Yamato's The Tale of Genji, which was published between 1979 and 1993. Books of the series were sold more than 20 million times, making it one of the best-selling shōjo manga. Yumiko Suzuki's Shiratori Reiko de Gozaimasu!, published between 1987 and 1992, was adapted into a popular live-action TV series, won the 1989 Kodansha Manga Award and its volumes were sold 17 million times. Junko Karube's Kimi no te ga Sasayaiteiru also won the Kodansha Manga Award in 1994 and its volumes were sold 3.5 million times. Mayumi Yoshida won the Kodansha Manga Award in 1980 for Remon Hakusho and Naka Marimura won it in 1990 for Pride. Suzue Miuchi's 1975 short story Shiroi Kagebōshi is considered a classic of shōjo horror manga.

The magazine marked the career start of several artists. Naka Marimura (1979), Tamiko Akaboshi (1979), Yumiko Suzuki (1982), Rinrin Takaguchi (1996) and Mitsurou Kubo (1996) all published their debut work in the magazine or its supplementary magazines.

== Serialized manga (selection) ==
=== Mimi ===
- Shiroi Kagebōshi (白い影法師) by Suzue Miuchi (1975)
- Asunaro-saka (あすなろ坂) by Machiko Satonaka (1977–1980)
- Remon Hakusho (れもん白書) by Mayumi Yoshida (1978–1979)
- Ten no Hate, Chi no Kagiri (天の果て 地の限り) by Waki Yamato (1978–1979)
- The Tale of Genji by Waki Yamato (1979–1993)
- Umibe no Kain by Minori Kimura (1980–1981)
- Idol wo Sagase (アイドルを探せ) by Mayumi Yoshida (1984–1987)
- Kunitachi Monogatari (くにたち物語) by Morii Ōno (1987–1992)
- Shiratori Reiko de Gozaimasu! by Yumiko Suzuki (1987–1992)
- Long Thai Baby (ロンタイBABY) by Satosumi Takaguchi (1988–1996)
- Valentine (バランタイン) by Fuyumi Ogura (1988–1992)
- Pride (プライド) by Naka Marimura (1989–1991)
- blue by Mari Ozawa (1990–1991)
- Kimi no te ga Sasayaiteiru (君の手がささやいている) by Junko Karube (1992–1996)
- Tenshi no Kajitsu (天使の果実) by Waki Yamato and Shizuka Ijūin (1993–1994)
- Niji no Natasha (虹のナターシャ) by Waki Yamato and Mariko Hayashi (1995–1997)

=== Supplementary magazines ===
- Tenjō no Niji (天上の虹) by Machiko Satonaka (Mimi DX, Mimi Excellent, 1983–1993, afterwards released directly in book form)
