= Haikara-San: Here Comes Miss Modern (film) =

Two-part film by Kazuhiro Furuhashu and Seimei Kidokoro

- Theatrical release poster for Part 1
- Kanji: 劇場版 はいからさんが通る
- Revised Hepburn: Gekijōban Haikara-san ga Tōru
- Directed by: Kazuhiro Furuhashi (Part 1); Seimei Kidokoro (Part 2)
- Screenplay by: Kazuhiro Furuhashi
- Based on: Haikara-San: Here Comes Miss Modern by Waki Yamato
- Produced by: Akio Matsuda; Chitose Kawazoe; Takashu Inoue
- Starring: Saori Hayami; Mamoru Miyano
- Cinematography: Takeo Ogiwara
- Edited by: Ayako Tan
- Music by: Michiru Ōshima
- Production company: Nippon Animation
- Distributed by: Warner Bros. Japan
- Release dates: November 11, 2017 (Part 1); October 19, 2018 (Part 2)
- Running time: 97 minutes (Part 1); 105 minutes (Part 2)
- Country: Japan
- Language: Japanese

Haikara-San: Here Comes Miss Modern (Note: Japanese: 劇場版 はいからさんが通る, Hepburn: Gekijōban Haikara-san ga Tōru; lit. "Haikara-San: Here Comes Miss Modern the Movie") is a Japanese two-part animated romance film based on a manga series of the a same title written and illustrated by Waki Yamato. Part 1 was directed by Kazuhiro Furuhashi and Part 2 by Seimei Kidokoro, while both films were written by Furuhashi, produced by Nippon Animation, and distributed by Warner Bros. Japan. The two-part film stars the voices of Saori Hayami and Mamoru Miyano. The first film, Part 1, (Note: 劇場版 はいからさんが通る 前編 ～紅緒、花の17歳～, Gekijōban Haikara-san ga Tōru Zenpen - Benio, Hana no 17-sai; lit. "Haikara-San: Here Comes Miss Modern the Movie Part 1: Benio, Hana 17 Years-Old") was released in Japan on November 11, 2017, and the second film, Part 2, (Note: 劇場版 はいからさんが通る 後編 ～花の東京大ロマン～, Gekijōban Haikara-san ga Tōru Kōhen: Hana no Tōkyō Dai Roman; lit. "Haikara-San: Here Comes Miss Modern the Movie Part 2: The Grand Tokyo Romance") on October 19, 2018.

== Plot ==
=== Part One ===
Raised by a single father who is also an army general, Benio is a tomboy with qualities that are deemed not feminine, and proclaims herself to be a modern woman. Her grandmother sets her up in an arranged marriage with an army lieutenant Shinobu Ijuin. Benio strongly believes that women should have the right to choose their own husband and wants a marriage based on love. She makes it her mission to give Shinobu's family a bad impression so that the arranged marriage doesn't go through. However, this becomes difficult as she starts falling for Shinobu's charm.

=== Part Two ===
After marrying the head of the military, Benio hears her husband died in Siberia during a war. However, after finding out he's alive and fighting against his home land, Benio starts looking for her first love. Wondering why he didn't return and wanting to welcome him back. Hardships will happen and hearts may be broken, as he might have moved on.

== Voice cast ==
Character	Japanese voice cast	English voice cast
Benio Hanamura	Saori Hayami	Mimi Torres
Shinobu Ijūin	Mamoru Miyano	Robbie Daymond
Major Hanamura	Unshō Ishizuka	Bill Rogers
Ranmaru Fujieda	Yuki Kaji	Shannon McKain
Shingo Onijima	Kazuya Nakai	Kirk Thornton
Tamaki Kitajoi	Asami Seto	Cristina Vee
Kichijii	Shizuka Itō	TBA
Tosei Inoue	Takahiro Sakurai	Keith Silverstein
Larissa	Maaya Sakamoto	TBA

== Production ==
It was first announced in November 2016 that an animated film adaptation of Haikara-San: Here Comes Miss Modern written and illustrated by Waki Yamato will be produced as a two-part film. Kazuhiro Furuhashi wrote the screenplay, Terumi Nishii was in charge of the character design, and Michiru Ōshima composed the music. Mitsuko Kase was set to direct the second film, but later was replaced by Seimei Kidokoro for unknown reasons. In July 2018, voice actress and singer Maaya Sakamoto joined the cast for Part 2 as Larissa.

The theme song for both films are performed by Saori Hayami, and written and composed by Mariya Takeuchi. Part 1 is "Yume no Hate Made" (夢の果てまで; lit. "Until the End of the Dream"), and Part 2 is "Atarashii Ashita" (新しい朝(あした); lit. "New Tomorrow").

== Release ==
Part 1 was released in theaters in Japan on November 11, 2017. Eleven Arts released it on home video.

Part 2 was released in theaters in Japan on October 19, 2018. Eleven Arts screened the film in the U.S. on December 17, 2018.
