= Miuchi =

Miuchi is a Japanese surname. Notable people with the surname include:

- Suzue Miuchi (born 1951), Japanese artist and author
- Takuro Miuchi (born 1975), Japanese rugby union player
