= Karube =

Karube (written: 苅部 or 軽部) is a Japanese surname. Notable people with the surname include:

- Hiroshi Karube (軽部 弘), Japanese Paralympic swimmer
- Junko Karube (軽部 潤子), Japanese manga artist
- Masaya Karube (軽部 雅也, born 1979), Japanese footballer
- Ryutaro Karube (苅部 隆太郎, born 1992), Japanese footballer
- Shunji Karube (苅部 俊二, born 1969), Japanese hurdler and sprinter
