= Genji Monogatari Sennenki =

Japanese anime television series

源氏物語千年紀 Genji (Genji Monogatari Sennenki Genji)
- Genre: Psychological, romance
- Created by: Murasaki Shikibu
- Anime television series
- Directed by: Osamu Dezaki; Satoshi Kuwabara (Assistant)
- Produced by: Hiroaki Nakajima; Kōji Yamamoto; Hideaki Miyamoto
- Written by: Tomoko Konparu
- Music by: S.E.N.S. Project
- Studio: Tezuka Productions; TMS Entertainment
- Original network: Fuji TV (Noitamina)
- Original run: January 15, 2009 – March 26, 2009
- Episodes: 11

Genji Monogatari Sennenki: Genji (源氏物語千年紀 Genji; lit. 'The Tale of Genji Millennium: Genji'), official title Millennium Old Journal: The Tale of Genji is a Japanese anime adaptation of The Tale of Genji. Originally, it was meant to be an anime adaptation of Waki Yamato's The Tale of Genji manga, but the director decided to make it a direct adaptation of the original tale. The character designs are still taken from Yamato's manga. The anime is directed by Osamu Dezaki. The series premiered on Fuji TV on January 15, 2009.

== Anime ==
Announced in August 2008, the series was originally meant to be an adaptation of Waki Yamato's manga adaptation, however, on November 10, 2008, it was announced that the series would now be a direct adaptation of the original novel, there were only a little changes to the staff. The series uses two pieces of theme music. The opening theme is "Hiyori Hime" by Puffy AmiYumi, while "Koi" (恋; lit. 'Love') by Kousuke Atari is the series' ending theme. On April 11, 2022, Digital Media Rights announced that they would be streaming the anime series on RetroCrush with English subtitles. The Anime ends at halfway with Genji being exlied to Suma.

=== Episodes ===
No.	Title	Original air date
1	Master Hikaru (光る君, Hikaru Kimi)	15 January 2009
2	Rokujou (六条, Rokujou)	22 January 2009
3	The Evening Glory (夕顔, Yūgao)	29 January 2009
4	The Princess of the Wisteria Pavilion (藤壺, Fujitsubo)	5 February 2009
5	Karma (宿世, Shukuse)	12 February 2009
6	The Lady of the Misty Moon (朧月夜, Oborozukiyo)	19 February 2009
7	The Lady Aoi (葵の上, Aoi no Ue)	26 February 2009
8	Sagano (嵯峨野, Sagano)	5 March 2009
9	Under Dark Clouds (叢雲, Murakumo)	12 March 2009
10	Treason (謀叛, Muhon)	19 March 2009
11	To Suma (若紫へ, Wakamurasaki e)	26 March 2009

== Soundtrack CDs ==
On February 25, 2009, Sony Music Entertainment released an animation soundtrack CD for Genji Monogatari Sennenki by S.E.N.S. Project and a single for the opening theme of Genji Monogatari Sennenki, "Hiyori Hime" by Puffy AmiYumi. On March 25, 2009, Sony Music Entertainment released a soundtrack CD for the ending theme of Genji Monogatari Sennenki, "Koi" by Kousuke Atari.

== See also ==
- List of characters from The Tale of Genji
