= List of My Love Story!! episodes =

My Love Story!! (Ore Monogatari!!) is an anime television series produced by Madhouse, based on the manga series by Kazune Kawahara. The series follows the muscular but kind-hearted Takeo Gōda, who forms a romance with the timid Rinko Yamato. The series, directed by Morio Asaka and written by Natsuko Takahashi, aired in Japan between April 8, 2015, and September 23, 2015, was simulcast by Crunchyroll. The opening theme is "Miraikei Answer" (未来形 Answer, lit. Futuristic Answer) by Trustrick while the ending theme is "Shiawase no Arika" (幸せのありか, lit. 'Where Happiness Lies') by Local Connect. The soundtrack is composed by S.E.N.S. Project. The series is licensed in North America by Sentai Filmworks.

== Episode list ==
No.	Title	Directed by	Written by	Original release date
1	"My Story"; Transliteration: "Ore no Monogatari" (Japanese: 俺のものがたり)	Kotono Watanabe	Natsuko Takahashi	April 8, 2015
Takeo Gōda is a large gorilla-like boy who, despite being admired by his male peers, has had little luck with romance. Every girl he develops a crush on ends up falling for his best friend, Makoto "Suna" Sunakawa, who always rejects their affections. Shortly after entering high school, Takeo rescues a girl named Rinko Yamato from being molested on the train. He ends up getting suspended from school after punching the molester at the police station. Rinko, thankful for her rescue, takes an interest in Takeo and offers to bake various treats for him, though Takeo assumes that Makoto is the one she likes.
2	"My Romance"; Transliteration: "Ore no Koi" (Japanese: 俺の恋)	Nanako Shimazaki	Natsuko Takahashi	April 15, 2015
Takeo tries to figure out the mystery behind Makoto, who has never shown any interest in girls despite being popular with them. As the two meet up with Rinko again, Takeo, convinced Makoto is the one she likes, tells her about all the times Makoto has helped him out. Later, after the pair exchange contact details with Rinko, a large construction girder comes crashing down towards Rinko, forcing Takeo to step in to protect her. Despite being urged by Takeo to get to safety, Makoto and Rinko stay behind to help hold up the girder until help arrives. Afterwards, Rinko asks to meet up with Takeo without Makoto, though Takeo assumes she is seeking advice on her relationship with Makoto.
3	"My Blue Ogre"; Transliteration: "Ore no Ao Oni" (Japanese: 俺の青鬼)	Hideki Hosokawa	Natsuko Takahashi	April 22, 2015
As Rinko meets up with Takeo, she becomes upset when all he does is talk up Makoto. When Takeo comes to his place for advice, Makoto clearly tells Takeo that he is the one Rinko is in love with, clearing up any misunderstandings he may have had. Makoto further clarifies that the reason he's rejected every girl who's confessed to him is because they all insulted Takeo behind his back. When Rinko comes over, Makoto hides Takeo under his bed and has Rinko clearly express her feelings for Takeo over and over so that he understands it, after which Takeo and Rinko properly confess to each other face-to-face and begin dating.
4	"My Boyfriend"; Transliteration: "Uchi no Kareshi" (Japanese: うちの彼氏)	Makoto Fuchigami	Natsuko Takahashi	April 29, 2015
Rinko invites Takeo to bring some of his male friends, Makoto included, to a singles' meet with some of her friends, who are surprised by Rinko's new boyfriend. Midway through the meet, Rinko becomes upset and runs away when she and Takeo overhear her friends, Aya and Nanako, badmouth Takeo behind their backs. Takeo catches up to her, stating that he doesn't care about the bad things people say about him because he is happy Rinko has been saying nice things about him. Just then, a fire breaks out at the building the meet was being held at, with Aya and Nanako still trapped inside. Takeo rushes in to save them, but gets trapped under some rubble himself after the girls have escaped safely. However, thanks to an encouraging phone call from Suna, Takeo gains the strength to stand up and escape the building by jumping through the second-story window, after which Rinko's friends now see him as cool as she does.
5	"I'm Dense"; Transliteration: "Ore wa Nibui" (Japanese: 俺はニブイ)	Kumiko Habara	Seiko Takagi	May 6, 2015
As word spreads around class about Takeo and Rinko's relationship, Takeo saves a child from drowning on his way to another date. The pair take a stroll through the park at night, where Takeo appears to miss some subtle hints from Rinko. Makoto is visited by his older sister Ai, who is shocked to hear Takeo has a girlfriend, having had a crush on him herself. The next day, Ai brings herself along to Takeo's next date to meet Rinko, who becomes shocked when she learns she messed up the cookies she baked. Rinko feels relieved that Takeo likes them anyway, but becomes downhearted when he mentions how pure she is, something Ai is keen to pick up on. Noticing Takeo realise his own denseness and putting in the effort to try and understand Rinko, Ai offers to speak to Rinko about what's bothering her.
6	"My Wish"; Transliteration: "Ore no Negai" (Japanese: 俺のねがい)	Tomoya Takahashi	Seiko Takagi	May 13, 2015
While Takeo studies up on shoujo manga in the hopes of better understanding girls, Makoto and Ai meet up with Rinko, who confesses that she wants to become more intimate with Takeo, but is afraid of telling him as he'll think she is impure. Putting her own happiness aside, Ai encourages Rinko to tell Takeo how she really feels, later telling Makoto about how she fell for Takeo. Catching up to Rinko, Takeo listens to each of her small demands, accepting them without argument. Rinko then confesses that she previously lied a few times in order to have an excuse to keep seeing Takeo, which just makes Takeo even happier. That night, as Ai makes her way back home, Rinko sees her first shooting star while Takeo asks Makoto to practice kissing with him, which is met with futile resistance.
7	"My Strength"; Transliteration: "Ore no Tsuyosa" (Japanese: 俺の強さ)	Kotono Watanabe	Seiko Takagi	May 20, 2015
Takeo agrees to join the judo club for a month in order to help them in an upcoming match against a rival school, despite the fact it'll give him less time to spend with Rinko. This time lessens further when Takeo asks Rinko not to meet him at night out of fear for her safety. As Rinko holds herself back from seeing Takeo to avoid interfering with his training, she tells Makoto about the reasons she fell in love with Takeo. On the day of the match, Takeo's opponent, Tsuyoshi Iwayama, feels that Takeo would have gotten soft from having a girlfriend, but Takeo manages to prove otherwise and wins the match for his team using the strength he gained from Rinko.
8	"My Friend"; Transliteration: "Ore no Tomodachi" (Japanese: オレのトモダチ)	Nanako Shimazaki	Natsuko Takahashi	May 27, 2015
While wondering what to do for Rinko's birthday on June 15, Takeo learns from his mother that he'll become a big brother come January. Claiming he has something else to do on the day of Rinko's birthday, Makoto instead helps Takeo with his plans for Rinko's birthday, becoming quite amused by his own memories his suggestions bring up. As Takeo takes on a part-time job at a café to earn money for a present for Rinko, he learns that Makoto's father had been hospitalized and is to undergo surgery on June 15. As Makoto urges Takeo not to abandon his plans with Rinko to accompany him, Takeo decides to respect his wishes.
9	"My Friend and I"; Transliteration: "Ore to Tomodachi" (Japanese: オレとトモダチ)	Hideki Hosokawa	Natsuko Takahashi	June 3, 2015
On June 15, after seeing Makoto off, Takeo begins his birthday outing with Rinko, following the plan that Makoto had laid out for him. After spending the day bowling and going to a fancy restaurant, Takeo keeps thinking about Makoto and tells Rinko about his father's surgery. Understanding Takeo's wishes, Rinko encourages him to go visit Makoto and stay by his side during his father's surgery. After the surgery goes successfully, Takeo and Makoto find Rinko waiting for them, enjoying her birthday despite the sudden change in plans.
10	"My Mountain"; Transliteration: "Ore no Yama" (Japanese: 俺の山)	Ryōichi Kuraya	Seiko Takagi	June 10, 2015
Takeo and Rinko go on a picnic in the mountains to make up for her birthday being interrupted. When a hawk tries to steal the brooch Takeo had bought for Rinko, the pair end up falling off the mountain, landing safely thanks to Takeo's efforts but winding up in an unknown part of the woods. As the pair try to make their way back to civilization, Rinko becomes anxious about having to spend the night alone with Takeo. That night, as Takeo goes to sleep, Rinko decides to give him a peck on the cheek. The next morning, Takeo and Rinko get to meet some woodland critters before reaching the roadside, after which they are able to get home safely.
11	"My Ocean"; Transliteration: "Ore no Umi" (Japanese: 俺の海)	Nanako Shimazaki	Seiko Takagi	June 17, 2015
Rinko invites Takeo and his friends to join her and her friends to the beach. As Rinko's friends encourage her to make her boyfriend's heart skip with a new swimsuit, Takeo remains determined to keep the beach experience purely about swimming and avoid looking at her in a lecherous way. Rinko starts feeling embarrassed at her failed attempts to become closer with Takeo, but the two eventually get to share a romantic view of the sunset together, though are interrupted before they can share their first kiss.
12	"My Scores"; Transliteration: "Ore no Hensachi" (Japanese: 俺の偏差値)	Makoto Fuchigami	Natsuko Takahashi	June 24, 2015
Hearing about Rinko wanting to go to the same college as him, Takeo asks Makoto to help him prepare for an upcoming benchmark exam so he can go to Rinko's university of choice. As Rinko comes around to help Takeo with his studies, Takeo's parents take extra measures to leave a good impression on their son's girlfriend, prompting Takeo to take his studies to Makoto's room. During the exam, Takeo manages to confidently get through the test with what he learned, only to discover he wrote all his answers in the wrong places, and though he rushes to fix his mistake he ends up with poor marks. As Rinko assures Takeo that they can both go to another college together, she points out the university Takeo took the test for was actually a women's college and he wouldn't have been able to go there anyway, something Suna had known all along.
13	"Today Is All On Me"; Transliteration: "Kyō wa Ore no Ogori da" (Japanese: 今日は俺のおごりだ)	Norihiko Nagahama	Seiko Takagi	July 1, 2015
Takeo and Rinko hold a surprise birthday outing for Makoto, with Takeo treating both of them. While at Takeo's workplace, the group meet Hayato Oda, one of Ai's acquaintances from university who came to see the boy she turned him down for. Later, after Takeo becomes concerned over Rinko turning down a trip to an amusement park, Ai and Hayato get Rinko to reveal she is cautious about a rumored jinx that causes couples who go there to break up. Since the jinx seems to only apply to dates, Hayato suggests that they make it a group outing with everyone. That night, Hayato spends the night at Takeo's place, where he explains how he fell in love with Ai. The next morning, Hayato reveals to Ai his intentions to separate Takeo from Rinko so she can confess her feelings to him.
14	"My Jinx"; Transliteration: "Ore no Jinkusu" (Japanese: 俺のジンクス)	Kotono Watanabe	Seiko Takagi	July 8, 2015
While at the amusement park, Hayato takes Rinko and Makoto with him in order to give Ai a chance to be alone with Takeo. As the two go on a wild goose chase searching for them, Ai comes close to confessing to Takeo, but ultimately decides against it, feeling that his obliviousness is what she likes about him. Instead she encourages Rinko to ignore the jinx and watch the evening parade with Takeo.
15	"My Girlfriend"; Transliteration: "Ore no Kanojo" (Japanese: 俺の彼女)	Nanako Shimazaki	Natsuko Takahashi	July 15, 2015
Takeo is participating in the upcoming sports festival on the class's Swedish relay team. The team runs into trouble when one of their fast runners sprains her ankle, and is replaced with the slower Mariya Saijou. Feeling that Mariya isn't as slow as everyone says she is, Takeo starts training her to run faster and ends up accidentally motivating her to run faster only because she was afraid the much faster Takeo would run her over. On the day of the festival, Mariya trips, but is encouraged by Takeo to get the baton over to him, allowing the team to win by a landslide. Afterwards, Mariya gives Takeo a towel as a thank-you gift, causing Rinko to become concerned that she might be a rival for Takeo's affections. A few days later, after Takeo helps her out with a twisted ankle, Mariya tells Takeo that she likes him as a person and asks to be his disciple, giving Rinko some relief.
16	"My Pupil"; Transliteration: "Ore no Deshi" (Japanese: 俺の弟子)	Hideki Hosokawa migmi	Natsuko Takahashi	July 22, 2015
Takeo and the others invite Mariya to join them for a festival being held at a university, with Rinko and Mariya bonding over their admiration for Takeo. Later, Makoto catches on that Mariya's feelings towards Takeo are indeed romantic, telling her that keeping them inside will only hurt her. Spurred on by Makoto's advice, Mariya confesses her feelings to Takeo, getting turned down in the process. Following this, Takeo realises that the reason Rinko shouldn't have to worry about him isn't because he is allegedly unpopular with the girls, but rather that he doesn't have eyes for any other girl but Rinko. Takeo reaffirms his love for Rinko while remaining good friends with Mariya.
17	"My Christmas"; Transliteration: "Ore no Kurisumasu" (Japanese: 俺のクリスマス)	Hazuki Mizumoto; Ippei Yokota	Seiko Takagi	July 29, 2015
While preparing for a Christmas party, Takeo learns that his friend Osamu Kurihara hopes to confess to Rinko's friend Nanako. Takeo and Rinko decide to do what they can to get them together. During the party however, Kurihara's overly pushy personality ends up angering Nanako, who ends up storming off when he has Takeo step in to protect her from delinquents instead of protecting her himself. After receiving some tough encouragement from Takeo to man up, Kurihara obtains a star from the top of a giant Christmas tree in order to prove himself to Nanako, and the two finally confess to each other.
18	"My Birthday"; Transliteration: "Ore no Tanjōbi" (Japanese: 俺の誕生日)	Nanako Shimazaki	Seiko Takagi	August 5, 2015
Hearing about how Osamu and Nanako have already kissed, Takeo contemplates waiting for the right time to kiss Rinko, while Rinko gets advice from Makoto and Ai about trying to kiss him herself. On New Year's Day, Takeo's birthday, Rinko goes with Takeo on a shrine visit before coming over to his place, where they are visited by many of Takeo's old friends. After finally getting some time alone, Rinko works up the courage to kiss Takeo while his eyes are closed making his birthday wish. Only after speaking with Makoto does Takeo realise he's been kissed and immediately rushes over to Rinko's home to have a second first kiss.
19	"My Mom"; Transliteration: "Ore no Kaa-chan" (Japanese: 俺のかあちゃん)	Makoto Fuchigami	Natsuko Takahashi	August 12, 2015
Rinko hears from Takeo's mother, Yuriko, about Takeo's birth and how he became so overprotective of her. Takeo tells Rinko about how he was 4300 grams (9 pounds 5 ounces) at birth, and Rinko tells Takeo she was born prematurely and weighed less than 2000 grams (4 pounds 4 ounces) and had to be kept in an incubator. As Takeo becomes concerned about Yuriko being so active near the end of her pregnancy, his father Yutaka talks about how he came to fall in love with her. Shortly after protecting another pregnant woman from falling down some stairs, Yuriko feels a pain in her stomach and has to be hospitalized, leaving Takeo understandably worried. As Rinko and Makoto come in to give Takeo their support, Yuriko goes into labor, with Takeo helping to carry Yuriko when she offers her wheelchair to another pregnant woman. With help from the safe birth charm Rinko gave her, Yuriko gives birth to a large but healthy baby girl, Maki, who at 4200 grams (9 pounds 3 ounces) is only slightly smaller than Takeo was. Rinko happily declares she wishes to work with children, either as a midwife or a nursery teacher.
20	"My Chocolate"; Transliteration: "Ore no Chokorēto" (Japanese: 俺のチョコレート)	Tōru Takahashi	Seiko Takagi	August 19, 2015
With Valentine's Day approaching, Rinko invites all of her friends to make chocolate together on the 13th while Takeo's friends ask to hang out with the girls on the 14th. As the girls and guys meet up on the 14th, Takeo becomes overly excited over what chocolate he'll receive from Rinko, only to become stunned when she leaves for home early without giving him any. Takeo assumes that the cookies he received earlier was in fact the chocolate in question and he regrets not having savoured it, only for Rinko to show up with her proper chocolate that she specially prepared just for him. Yuriko ends up berating Takeo for constantly waking up Maki with his overjoyed shouting.
21	"The Letter and Me"; Transliteration: "Ore to Tegami" (Japanese: 俺と手紙)	Kotono Watanabe	Natsuko Takahashi	August 26, 2015
Takeo comes across a girl named Yukika Amami, who has had a crush on Makoto since kindergarten, but hasn't had the courage to talk to him for the past ten years. Upon being given an opportunity to actually speak to Makoto, Yukika ends up blurting her confession immediately. Recognising her as the girl who gives him an anonymous Valentines each year, Makoto agrees to exchange details with Yukika in order to get to know her better before making a decision. As Yukika continues to struggle to talk to Makoto properly, Rinko offers her own advice, suggesting that they all go to the zoo together.
22	"The Letter to Me"; Transliteration: "Ore e no Tegami" (Japanese: オレへの手紙)	Nanako Shimazaki	Seiko Takagi	September 2, 2015
While on their outing to the zoo, Yukika continues to struggle with talking directly to Makoto, but eventually manages to work her way up to casual conversation. Later, Yukika manages to win a quiz contest with Makoto, managing to talk a lot more with him during the rest of the day. The next day, however, Yukika becomes convinced that Makoto only accompanied her out of kindness and not because of love, feeling that she should just give up and break off her ties with everyone. Not wanting things to end just like that, Takeo and Rinko catch up to her, helping her understand her feelings. Afterwards, Makoto gives Yukika a gift in return for the chocolates she gave him every year, properly turning her down while still leaving her with happy memories.
23	"My Spring Break"; Transliteration: "Uchi no Haruyasumi" (Japanese: うちの春休み)	Tōru Takahashi	Seiko Takagi	September 9, 2015
During spring break, Rinko takes a part-time job at a cake shop, catching the attention of the shop's assistant, Kouki Ichinose. While getting used to the job, Rinko helps Kouki to sell some of his own cake ideas, which he starts to misinterpret as her having feelings for him. This leads to some jealousy from Takeo, as Kouki starts speaking with Rinko on a first name basis, something Takeo has not yet done himself. Upon finding out that Takeo is Rinko's boyfriend, Kouki tries to convince him to break up with her, believing himself to be the better man for her. Takeo becomes concerned that Kouki may have a point, especially after seeing him giving a lift to Rinko in his car. Kouki asks Rinko to help him in a patissiére contest.
24	"My Heart"; Transliteration: "Ore no Kokoro" (Japanese: 俺のココロ)	Hideki Hosokawa; Kotono Watanabe; Morio Asaka	Natsuko Takahashi	September 23, 2015
Rinko offers to take Takeo out on her day off, only to have to cancel it at Kouki's request. As Takeo starts questioning if it is alright to be with Rinko, her friends assure him that Rinko chose him for who he is, strengthening his resolve to not lose to Kouki. Resolving to win the patissiére contest and confess his feeling towards Rinko, Kouki gets inspiration from Rinko's gushing about Takeo to create a unique sweet for the contest. On the day of the contest, Kouki ends up leaving his cake-making tools at the store, so Rinko asks Takeo to get them to him before the contest starts. Thanks to the support of both Rinko and Takeo, Kouki manages to win the gold medal and makes his confession to Rinko, who chooses to stay with Takeo and assures Kouki that he won through his own effort. Afterwards, Takeo starts calling Rinko by her first name, bringing their relationship a small step further.
