= The Tale of Genji (manga) =

Japanese manga series by Waki Yamato

- The Tale of Genji: Dreams at Dawn
- Cover of the third tankōbon volume, featuring Hikaru Genji (right)

あさきゆめみし (Asakiyumemishi)
- Genre: Drama; Historical; Romance
- Manga
- Written by: Waki Yamato
- Published by: Kodansha
- English publisher: NA: Kodansha USA (digital)
- Magazine: Mimi; Minmi Excellent
- Original run: 1979 – 1993
- Volumes: 13

The Tale of Genji: Dreams at Dawn (あさきゆめみし, Asakiyumemishi) is a Japanese manga series written and illustrated by Waki Yamato. It is a manga adaptation of Murasaki Shikibu's The Tale of Genji, staying largely faithful to the original plot while incorporating some modern elements. The series was serialized in Kodansha's shōjo manga magazines Mimi and Minmi Excellent from 1979 to 1993, with its chapters compiled into 13 tankōbon volumes.

The first ten volumes focus on Hikaru Genji and his life, while the final three volumes shift to two princes—Lord Kaoru and Niou no Miya (the "Royal Prince with Perfumes")—following Hikaru Genji's death.

Kodansha International published four volumes of the series as part of its bilingual manga program from 2000 to 2001. Later, Kodansha USA released the manga digitally in ten volumes between 2019 and 2020.

An anime adaptation was initially planned to air on Fuji TV's Noitamina programming block starting in January 2009. However, the producers decided to create the anime directly based on the original The Tale of Genji, resulting in the new title Genji Monogatari Sennenki.

The manga series has sold over 18 million copies.

== Characters ==
Hikaru Genji
Hikaru Genji is a royal prince and the second son of Emperor Kiritsubo. Renowned for his beauty and excellence, he was often referred to as the "Shining Prince." Due to his mother's low rank as a concubine, the Emperor established a branch house for him called Gen. This effectively removed him from the royal family and stripped him of his right to inherit the throne. As a result, he was called Gen-ji, meaning "shining Gen-ji" (Hikaru Genji) ; but his actual name would be, originally, Hikaru-shinnō, and then Minamoto no Ason Hikaru no Kimi. The Onyomi
Empof Minamoto, Genji, was used poetically. eror Kiritsubo
Emperor Kiritsubo is the father of Hikaru Genji. Although he wished for Genji to become his successor, it was not possible due to the low rank of Genji's mother, Kiritsubo-koui. In contrast, the mother of his first son, Kokiden-nyougo, held a much higher rank.
Kiritsubo-koui
Kiritsubo-koui was a second-class concubine of Emperor Kiritsubo and the mother of Hikaru Genji. She was the Emperor's most beloved, but the jealousy and resentment of the other concubines in the palace ultimately led to her untimely death.
Kokiden-nyougo
Kokiden-nyougo was a first-class concubine of Emperor Kiritsubo and the mother of his first royal prince, who later became Emperor Suzaku. She was the daughter of the Minister of the Right.
Fujitsubo-nyougo
Fujitsubo-nyougo was a royal princess and a first-class concubine of Emperor Kiritsubo. She bore a striking resemblance to the late Kiritsubo-koui, which endeared her to the Emperor, leading to her elevation as the Empress Consort (Chuuguu). Lord Genji also secretly loved and adored Fujitsubo, ultimately leading him to commit adultery with her.
Murasaki no ue
Murasaki no Ue was the daughter of the Imperial Prince Hyobukyo no Miya and the niece of Empress Consort Fujitsubo. Lord Genji first met her when she was 12 years old. Eventually, he married her, and she came to be known as Murasaki no Ue (Lady Murasaki).
Aoi no ue
Aoi no Ue was the daughter of the Minister of the Left and the first wife of Hikaru Genji. She was four years older than Genji and was originally raised to marry the next emperor. However, she was instead wed to Genji, the Emperor's second son, which caused her to grow cold and distant toward him. Tragically, Aoi was killed by the jealous living spirit of Lady Rokujou.
Rokujou-miyasudokoro
Rokujou-miyasudokoro was the mother of Umetsubo-nyougo and a first-class concubine of the former Crown Prince, who was the elder brother of Emperor Kiritsubo. After her husband's death, she withdrew into her mansion and only appeared at poetry recitals. Renowned for her wisdom and charm, she was highly admired at court and became Genji's mistress. Her intense love for him eventually overwhelmed Prince Genji, leading him to distance himself from her. The title "Miyasudokoro" refers to the mother of a royal prince or princess.
Yuugiri
Yuugiri was the second son of Hikaru Genji. His mother was Lady Aoi.
Emperor Suzaku
Emperor Suzaku was the first son of Emperor Kiritsubo, and his mother was Kokiden-nyougo. Suzaku succeeded his father to the throne and became emperor. As a result, Kokiden-nyougo became the Grand Empress Consort.
Emperor Reizei
Emperor Reizei was the son of Empress Consort Fujitsubo. Although he was officially recognized as the royal prince, the son of Emperor Kiritsubo, his real father was Lord Genji, making him a child of adultery.
Tou-no-chuujou
Tou-no-chuujou was the eldest son of the Minister of the Left and the older brother of Aoi. He was both a rival and a close friend of Genji.
Yuugao
Yuugao was a young woman from the middle class, renowned for her beauty. She was one of Genji's loves and was tragically killed by the vengeful spirit of the jealous Rokujou-miyasudokoro at the age of nineteen. Her death plunged Genji into a deep depression. Yuugao left behind a daughter, Tamakadura, who was the child of Tou-no-chuujou.
Oborodukiyo
Oborodukiyo was the daughter of the Minister of the Right and the younger sister of the Grand Empress Consort Kokiden. She was known for her beauty and bravery. Kokiden had planned to make her a first-class concubine of Emperor Suzaku, but Oborodukiyo had an affair with Lord Genji. She later became the chief Lady of the Chamber (Naishi-no-kami) to Emperor Suzaku. Kokiden was enraged by this, prompting Genji to retire to the seashore palace at Suma.
Akashi-no-okata
Akashi-no-okata was the daughter of Priest Akashi. When Genji and his followers were caught in a typhoon at Suma, they sought refuge at Priest Akashi's house. During their stay, Genji had an affair with her, resulting in the birth of a daughter, who would later be known as Akashi-no-nyougo.
Shin-Kokiden-nyougo
Shin-Kokiden-nyougo was the daughter of Tou-no-chuujou and the elder sister of Kumoi-no-Kari. She was a first-class concubine of Emperor Reizei.
Umetsubo-nyougo
Umetsubo-nyougo was the daughter of Rokujou-Miyasudokoro and the former Crown Prince. She was a royal princess and entered the palace of Emperor Reizei as a nyougo (first-class concubine). After her mother's death, Genji became her father-in-law in the palace. Emperor Reizei eventually discovered that Genji was his real father, which caused him great emotional turmoil, but he later came to terms with it. Reizei raised Umetsubo to the position of Empress Consort, as she was Genji's daughter. She became known as Akikonomu-chuuguu. Genji, in turn, became the de facto Ex-Emperor, known as Rokujou-in.
Kumoi-no-Kari
Kumoi-no-Kari was the daughter of Tou-no-chuujou and the younger sister of Shin-Kokiden-nyougo. She fell in love with Yuugiri, the son of Genji, and later married him.
Tamakadura
Tamakadura was the daughter of Tou-no-chuujou. She left Kyoto for Dazai-fu in Kyushu at a young age. After growing up and becoming a young lady, she returned to Kyoto. Genji recognized her and announced that she was his daughter. Many high-ranking noblemen sent love letters to her. The Royal Army General of the Left, Kurohige, proposed to her and subsequently kidnapped her.

== Publication ==
Written and illustrated by Waki Yamato, The Tale of Genji was serialized in Kodansha's shōjo manga magazines Minmi and Minmi Excellent from 1979 to 1993. Kodansha collected the chapters into 13 tankōbon volumes, released between November 15, 1980, to July 13, 1993.

Kodansha International published four volumes as part of its bilingual manga program from 2000 to 2001. Kodansha USA began publishing the manga digitally, releasing ten volumes from February 26, 2019, to February 4, 2020.
