= Minori Kimura =

Japanese manga artist

Minori Kimura 樹村 みのり
- Born: 11 November 1949 (age 77) Saitama Prefecture, Japan
- Area: Manga artist
- Notable works: Nanohana short stories; Hoshi ni Sumu Hitobito; Umibe no Kain

Minori Kimura (樹村 みのり, Kimura Minori; born 11 November 1949 in Saitama Prefecture) is a Japanese manga artist. Scholars often include her in the Year 24 Group, an informal grouping of female artists who revolutionized shōjo manga (girls' comics) in the 1970s.

She made her professional debut in 1964 at the age of 14 with the short story Picnic (ピクニック, Pikunikku), published by Shueisha in the spring break special issue of Ribon. During her school holidays, Kimura continued to publish short stories in magazines such as COM and Ribon Comic. Her settings throughout the 1960s and early 1970s varied widely, featuring locations such as Auschwitz, Vietnam, and the slums of Rio de Janeiro. She focused on topics of interest to adolescent girls, exploring the complex feelings and motivations of her characters.

After graduating from college, Kimura took a brief hiatus from creating manga before returning with Okurimono (贈り物, "Gift"), published by Shogakukan in Bessatsu Shōjo Comic in 1974. The story focused on the struggles of elementary school life. She later published Nanohana Hatake no Kochiragawa (菜の花畑のこちら側, "This Side of the Rapeseed Blossom Field"), a short story about four female college students living together. The work brought her wider popularity. From that point, Kimura generally published in shōjo (aimed at teenage girls), seinen (aimed at young men), and josei (aimed at adult women) magazines published by Akita Shoten and Kodansha.

Later in her career, Kimura published fewer new works, with most of her releases consisting of reprints. She has also created several health-related manga. In 2008, she concluded a serialization in Mugenkan, a magazine published by Asahi Sonorama.

Rachel Thorn, an anthropologist specializing in shōjo manga, described Kimura as "one of the most brilliant and largely forgotten members of the [Year 24 Group]". Thorn praised her for creating manga with "explicitly social and feminist messages" and for addressing "issues of interest to women, including sexuality, work, and health".

== Works ==
- Picnic (ピクニック, Pikunikku) (1964, Ribon, Shueisha)
- Ame (雨, "Rain") (December 1966, Ribon, Shueisha)
- Ashita Kagayaku Hoshi (あした輝く星, "Tomorrow's Shining Star") (April–June 1967, Ribon, Shueisha)
- Tomī (トミィ, "Tommy") (May 1968, Ribon Comics, Shueisha)
- Fūsen (風船, "Balloon") (March 1969, Junior Comics, Shueisha)
- Tonneru (トンネル, "Tunnel") (May 1969, Junior Comics, Shueisha)
- Otōto (おとうと, "Little Brother") (September 1969, COM, Mushi Pro)
- Kaihō no Saishō no Hi (解放の最初の日, "The First Day of Liberation") (May–June 1970, COM, Mushi Pro)
- Mamoru-kun ga Shinda (まもる君が死んだ, "Mamoru Is Dead") (May 1970, Ribon Comic, Shueisha)
- Umi e (海へ, "To the Sea") (September 1970, Ribon Comic, Shueisha)
- Karunabaru (カルナバル, "Carnival") (October 1970, Ribon Comic, Shueisha)
- Fuyu no Hanabi (冬の花火, "Winter Fireworks") (February 1971, Ribon Comic, Shueisha)
- Tobenai Tobibako (跳べないとび箱, "Cannot Jump the Vaulting Box") (May 1971, Ribon, Shueisha)
  - Collected in Poketto no Naka no Kisetsu (ポケットの中の季節, "Seasons in My Pocket")
- Onē-san no Kekkon (おねえさんの結婚, "Big Sister's Marriage") (September 1971, COM, Mushi Pro)
- Kōfuku na Hanashi (こうふくな話, "Happy Talk") (December 1971, COM, Mushi Pro)
- Uruguai kara no Tegami (ウルグアイからの手紙, "Letter from Uruguay") (May 1973, Gekkan Funny, Mushi Pro)
  - Collected in Poketto no Naka no Kisetsu Tsū (ポケットの中の季節2, "Seasons in My Pocket 2")
- Okurimono (贈り物, "Gift") (October 1974, Bessatsu Shōjo Comic, Shogakukan)
- Mienai Aki (見えない秋, "Unseen Autumn") (November 1974, Bessatsu Shōjo Comic, Shogakukan)
- Nanohana (菜の花, "Rapeseed Blossoms") (January 1975, Bessatsu Shōjo Comic, Shogakukan)
- Tsubasa no Nai Tori (翼のない鳥, "Wingless Bird") (April–May 1975, Bessatsu Shōjo Comic, Shogakukan)
- Byōki no Hi (病気の日, "Sick Day") (August 1975, Ribon Comic, Shueisha)
- Watashi-tachi no Hajimari (わたしたちの始まり, "Our Beginning") (September 1975, Bessatsu Shōjo Comic, Shogakukan)
- Nanohana Hatake no Kochiragawa (菜の花畑のこちら側, "This Side of the Rapeseed Blossom Field") (November 1975 – January 1976, Bessatsu Shōjo Comic, Shogakukan)
- Sōshun (早春, "Early Spring") (Spring 1976, Ribon Deluxe, Shueisha)
- Hoshi ni Sumu Hitobito (星に住む人びと, "The People Living in the Stars") (November 1976, Bessatsu Shōjo Comic, Shogakukan)
- Nanohana Hatake no Mukō to Kochira (菜の花畑のむこうとこちら, "That and This Side of the Rapeseed Blossom Field") (March 1977, Bessatsu Shōjo Comic, Shogakukan)
- 40-0 (March 1977, Mimi, Kodansha)
- Watashi no Uchūjin (わたしの宇宙人, "My Alien") (1 May 1977, Big Comic Original, Shogakukan)
- Umi no Hōseki (海の宝石, "Jewel of the Sea") (September 1977, Mimi, Kodansha)
- Nanohana Hatake wa Yoru mo Sugara (菜の花畑は夜もすがら, "If the Rapeseed Blossom Field Is also Clinging to the Night") (October 1977, Bessatsu Shōjo Comic, Shogakukan)
- Kakkō no Musume-tachi (カッコーの娘たち, "The Cuckoo's Daughters") (April, June 1978, Mimi, Kodansha)
- Ken Ken Ken Monogatari (犬・けん・ケン物語, "Dog Dog Dog Tales") (May–June, September 1978, Princess, Akita Shoten)
- Nanohara Hatake wa Man'in Onrei (菜の花畑は満員御礼, "Many Thanks for Supporting Nanohara Hatake") (December 1978, Bessatsu Shōjo Comic, Shogakukan)
- Flight (April 1979, Seventeen, Shueisha)
- Maruta to Rīza (マルタとリーザ, "Marta and Leeza") (December 1979 – February 1980, Manga Shōnen, Asahi Sonorama)
- Sabaku no Ō-sama (砂漠の王さま, "King of the Desert") (February 1980, Seventeen, Shueisha)
- Umibe no Kain (海辺のカイン "Cain of the Seaside") (June, August, November 1980 and January, March 1981, Mimi, Kodansha)
- Warui Ko (悪い子, "Bad Girl") (August 1980, Petit Comic, Shogakukan)
- Jōn B no Natsu (ジョーン・Bの夏, "Joan B's Summer") (Summer 1980, Petit Flower, Shogakukan)
  - Revised version published in the 1 July 1981 issue of Shōnen Shōjo Esuefu Manga Daizenshū (少年少女SFマンガ大全集, "The Boys and Girls SF Manga Complete Collection")
- Pyūgurumun (ピューグルムン) (January–March 1981, Petit Comic, Shogakukan)
- Azami no Hana (あざみの花, "Azami's Flower") (August, December 1981, February 1982, Comic Tom, Ushio Publishing)
- Yuganda Kagami (歪んだ鏡, "Warped Mirror") (Early Spring Special 1982, Bonita, Akita Shoten)
- Hahaoya no Musume-tachi (母親の娘たち, "Mother's Daughters") (January–June 1984, Bonita Eve, Akita Shoten)
- Kinō no Tsuzuki (昨日の続き, "Continuation of Yesterday") (February 1987, Viva Princess, Akita Shoten)
- Doi Takako Monogatari (土井たか子物語, "Takako Doi Story") (October 1989, Comic Burger, Schola)
  - Later reprinted as Doi Takako Gurafuti (土井たかこグラフティ, "Takako Doi Graffiti")
- Shirīzu: Yokokara no Kōzu (シリーズ・横からの構図, "Series: An Outside View") (October 1990 – August 1992, Human Sexuality)
- Karera no Hanzai (彼らの犯罪, "Their Crimes") (December 1992, Rosa, Shōnen Gahōsha)
- And I Love Her (June 1993, Rosa, Shōnen Gahōsha)
- Yume no Iriguchi (夢の入り口, "The Entrance to Dreams") (March 1993, Rosa, Shōnen Gahōsha)
- Oya ga Korosu (親が・殺す, "Parents Kill") (September 1993, Belle Rose, Shōnen Gahōsha)
- Nigatsu no Kokonoka Kan (二月の九日間, "Nine Days in February") (December 1993, January–February 1994, Belle Rose, Shōnen Gahōsha)
  - Later reprinted as Fuyu no Tsubomi: Beate Shirota to Josei no Kenri (冬の蕾：ベアテ・シロタと女性の権利, "Winter Flower Buds: Beate Sirota and Women's Rights")
- The Rose (March 1994, Belle Rose, Shōnen Gahōsha)
- You've Got a Friend (June 1994, Belle Rose, Shōnen Gahōsha)
- Shoshū (初秋, "Early Autumn") (September 1994, Belle Rose, Shōnen Gahōsha)
- Kyō made Soshite Ashita kara (今日までそして明日から, "Until Today, and From Tomorrow On") (August 1995, Belle Rose, Shōnen Gahōsha)
- Sekushuaru Harasumento no Nai Sekai e (セクシュアル・ハラスメントのない世界へ, "Toward a World Without Sexual Harassment") (May 2000, Tokyo Women's Foundation)
- Miokuri no Ato de (見送りの後で, "After Seeing You Off") (2006, Mugenkan, Asahi Sonorama)
- Hoshi ni Sumu Hitobito (星に住む人々, "The People Living in the Stars") (2007, Mugenkan, Asahi Sonorama)
  - Remake of her 1976 short story of the same name
