= Machiko Satonaka =

Japanese manga artist

Machiko Satonaka 里中 満智子
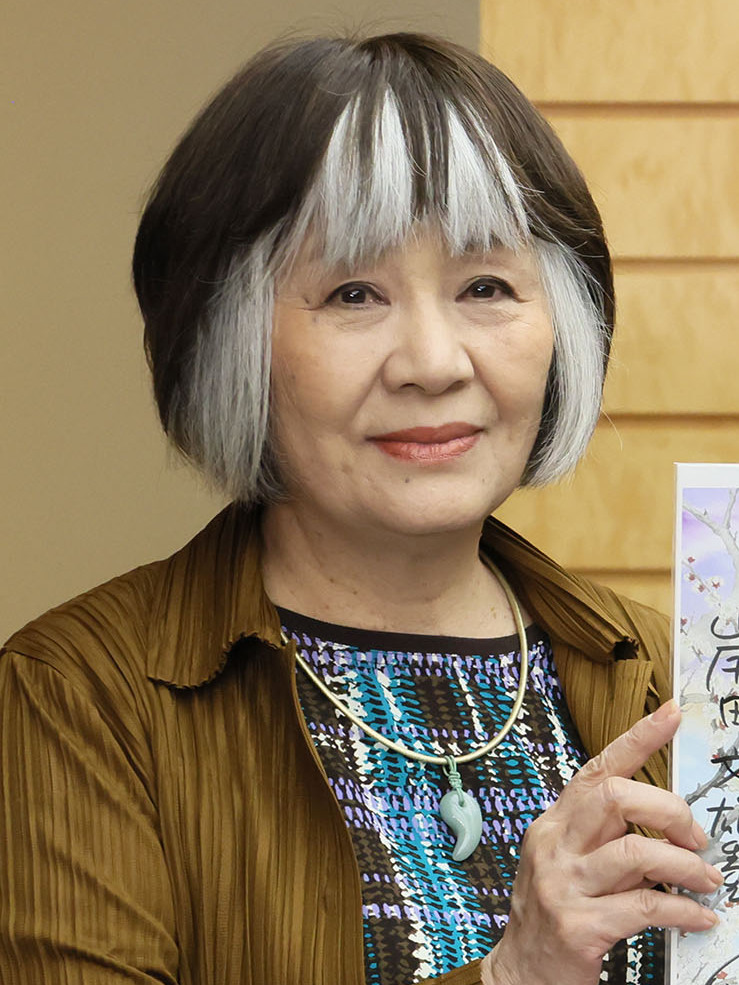
- Satonaka in 2023
- Born: 24 January 1948 (age 78) Osaka, Japan
- Area: Manga artist
- Notable works: Ashita Kagayaku; Ariesu no Otometachi; Karyūdo no Seiza; Tenjō no Niji
- Awards: See below

Machiko Satonaka (里中 満智子, Satonaka Machiko; born 24 January 1948) is a Japanese manga artist. She made her professional debut in 1964 during her second year of high school with the one-shot Pia no Shōzō ("Portrait of Pia"). She has since created nearly 500 manga in a variety of genres. Two of her most notable works are Ashita Kagayaku ("Tomorrow Will Shine"), which won the 1974 Kodansha Publishing Culture Award, and Karyūdo no Seiza ("Constellation of the Hunter"), which won the 1982 Kodansha Manga Award. In addition to creating manga, Satonaka teaches at the Osaka University of Arts as the head of the Character Creative Arts Department and serves on the board of various manga-related organizations in Japan.

== Early life ==
Machiko Satonaka was born on 24 January 1948 in Osaka, Japan. As a child, her elementary school banned students from reading manga such as Astro Boy because of its violent and unscientific content; her teachers even burned manga in front of her class. Satonaka—who admired the works of Osamu Tezuka, Shotaro Ishinomori, Tetsuya Chiba, and Hideko Mizuno—was filled with a desire to "protect manga" and to "contribute to raising its status" in society by becoming an artist herself.

== Career ==
In 1964, during her second year of high school, Satonaka made her professional debut with the one-shot Pia no Shōzō ("Portrait of Pia"), published in Kodansha's Shōjo Friend magazine; for this, she received the inaugural Kodansha New Faces Award. The editorial staff of Shōjo Friend subsequently advertised Satonaka as "a genius girl". She dropped out of school against her parents' wishes and moved to Tokyo to pursue her career.

As of 2019, Satonaka has created nearly 500 manga for both shōjo (young girls) and josei (adult women) in a variety of genres, including romantic comedies, fantasy epics, and historical dramas. Her longest-running manga, Tenjō no Niji ("Celestial Rainbow"), depicts the life of the Japanese Empress Jitō and was serialized for more than 30 years. Two of her works—a short story collection titled Machiko's One Thousand and One Nights and an anthology of Biblical tales titled The Old Testament—are available in English on the digital manga website Manga Reborn. Masami Toku, a scholar and professor of art education at California State University, Chico, described Satonaka as an artist who "consistently protested against a stereotypical male view of women, which often demanded that they remain young and immature, and instead wholeheartedly affirmed women's growth and maturity."

In addition to creating manga, Satonaka serves as the head of the Osaka University of Arts Character Creative Arts Department; the director of the Japan Cartoonists Association; the director of the Manga Japan foundation; the chairperson of the Digital Manga Association; a representative of the NPO Asia Manga Summit Administering Authority; and a member of the Cabinet Secretariat of Japan Intellectual Property Strategy Headquarters.

== Selected works ==
- Pia no Shōzō (ピアの肖像; "Portrait of Pia"), 1964
- Nana to Riri (ナナとリリ; "Nana and Lili"), 1967
- Watashi no Jonī (わたしのジョニー; "My Johnny"), 1968
- RaRa Hāto (ララ・ハート; "LaLa Heart"), 1968–1969
- Redī An (レディー・アン; "Lady Ann"), 1969–1970
- Ashita Kagayaku (あした輝く; "Tomorrow Will Shine"), 1972–1973
- Hime ga Iku! (姫が行く！; "There Goes the Princess!"), 1973–1974
- Ariesu no Otometachi (アリエスの乙女たち; "Ladies of Aries"), 1973–1975
- Cleopatra (クレオパトラ), 1975, serialized in Shōjo Friend
- Asunaro Zaka (あすなろ坂; "Cypress Hill"), 1977–1980, serialized in Mimi
- Umi no Ōrora (海のオーロラ; lit. 'Aurora of the Ocean'), 1978–1980
- Karyūdo no Seiza (狩人の星座; "Constellation of the Hunter"), 1979–1981
- Tenjō no Niji (天上の虹; "Celestial Rainbow"), 1983–2015, serialized in Mimi DX and Mimi Excellent (until 1993)
- Tsurukame Warutsu (鶴亀ワルツ; "Crane Turtle Waltz"), 1996–1997
- Raphael - Sono Ai (ラファエロ―その愛), 1996

=== Translated into English ===
- Machiko's One Thousand and One Nights (まちこの千夜一夜, Machiko no Senya Ichiya), published by Shoeisha in 1995; translated for the digital manga website Manga Reborn in 2013
- The Old Testament (マンガ旧約聖書, Manga Kyūyaku Seisho), published by Chuokoron-Shinsha in 2011; translated for the digital manga website Manga Reborn in 2014

== Awards ==
- 1964: Kodansha New Faces Award for Pia no Shōzō
- 1974: Kodansha Publishing Culture Award in the children's manga category for Ashita Kagayaku and Hime ga Iku!
- 1982: Kodansha Manga Award in the general manga category for Karyūdo no Seiza
- 2006: Japanese Ministry of Culture and Science's Achievement Certificate for Lifetime Works and Cultural Activities
- 2010: Commendation of the Commissioner for Cultural Affairs
- 2013: Kojiki Publishing Grand Prize's Ō no Yasumaro Award for Kojiki: Manga Koten Bungaku
- 2014: Japanese Foreign Minister's Commendation for "the promotion of cultural exchange through manga between Japan and foreign countries"
- 2023: Person of Cultural Merit
- 2026: Order of the Rising Sun, 3rd Class, Gold Rays with Neck Ribbon
