= Haikara-San: Here Comes Miss Modern =

Japanese manga series by Waki Yamato

- Cover of the first manga volume

はいからさんが通る (Haikara-san ga Tōru)
- Genre: Historical; Romantic comedy
- Manga
- Written by: Waki Yamato
- Published by: Kodansha
- Magazine: Shōjo Friend
- Original run: 1975 – 1977
- Volumes: 8
- Anime television series
- Music by: Masuhiro Yamaguchi
- Studio: Nippon Animation
- Original network: ANN (ABC, TV Asahi)
- Original run: June 3, 1978 – March 31, 1979
- Episodes: 42
- Live-action television film
- Original network: KTV
- Released: 1979
- Live-action television film
- Studio: Fuji Television; Izumi TV Production
- Original network: FNS (Fuji TV)
- Released: 1985
- Live-action film
- Written by: Takaya Nishioka
- Studio: Toei Company
- Released: December 12, 1987
- Runtime: 90 minutes
- Live-action television film
- Original network: TBS
- Released: 2002
- Anime film
- Haikara-San: Here Comes Miss Modern (2017–18)
- icon

Takarazuka Revue
- Original language: Japanese
- Written by: Naoko Koyanagi
- Genre: Musical Theatre

Premiere
- Date: October 7, 2017
- Place: Umeda Arts Theater, Osaka
- Official website

Haikara-San: Here Comes Miss Modern (Japanese: はいからさんが通る, Hepburn: Haikara-san ga Tōru), also known as Smart-san or Mademoiselle Anne, is a Japanese manga series written and illustrated by Waki Yamato. It was serialized by Kodansha in the magazine Shōjo Friend from 1975 to 1977. The title can be literally translated into English as Here Comes Miss Modern, Here Comes Miss High-Collar ("haikara" being the wasei eigo for "high collar"), or Fashionable Girl Passing By. In 1977, it was awarded the 1st Kodansha Manga Award for shōjo manga.

The series was later adapted as a 42-episode anime television series produced by Nippon Animation, which aired in Japan on TV Asahi in Tokyo and other local stations across the country from June 3, 1978, to March 31, 1979. The anime was later rebroadcast across Japan on the anime satellite television network Animax and on NHK satellite channel BS2. The manga was also adapted into three television drama specials and theatrical film. Two new anime films have been released, with the first film in 2017, and the second film in 2018. In 2017, the story was also adapted for the musical theatre of the Takarazuka Revue.

== Plot ==
One day, Benio Hanamura has a series of embarrassing encounters with the army lieutenant Shinobu Ijuin (voiced by Katsuji Mori). Benio encounters Shinobu again when she arrives home that day, and promptly attacks him with her kendo stick, only to receive a shock when her father (voiced by Ichiro Nagai) tells her that Shinobu is to be her husband, due to a pact made between the Hanamura and Ijuin families before Benio's birth. Since Benio's friend Tamaki is in love with Shinobu, Benio also wants out of the engagement to avoid hurting Tamaki.

Moved by this unexpected show of kindness, Benio decides to forget Shinobu and accept Tosei's proposal of marriage. Lalissa is fatally injured in the quake trying to save Shinobu, and as she lies dying, she tells Shinobu to marry Benio and be happy. Tosei tries to save Benio, but Benio refuses, preferring to die alongside her beloved rather than face life without him; thus, Tosei rescues both Benio and Shinobu.

In the end, Tosei comes to terms with his feelings about his mother and rededicates himself to his business; Onijima returns to Manchuria, Tamaki decides to obey her heart and follow him, and Benio and Shinobu are wed at last.

== Distribution ==
The manga was serialized in Kodansha's Shōjo Friend magazine in Japan from 1975 to 1977. It remains a popular nostalgia item in Japan to this day, considered a classic work from the same 1970s shōjo manga boom that gave birth to such popular titles as Candy Candy, and copies are still in print. The anime adaptation of the story, which aired across Japan on the terrestrial TV Asahi network from June 1978 to March 1979, spanned 42 episodes, was directed by Kazuyoshi Yokota (Spaceship Sagittarius, Grimm's Fairy Tale Classics, My Daddy-Long-Legs), and featured character designs by future Ranma 1/2 director Tsutomu Shibayama.

Due to disappointing ratings, Nippon Animation was forced to end the series early and craft an ending to the anime that was different from that of the manga, cutting the story off after the arrival of Shinobu and Lalissa in Japan. In the final episode, Benio is told that the mysterious Russian count is not Shinobu (Lalissa has a photograph of their wedding day to prove it). However, an epilogue narration reveals that Lalissa found Shinobu in Siberia. He was severely hurt, and was the spitting image of her late husband. The final episode concludes with Benio finally being reunited with Shinobu. Up until this point, the anime had been a very faithful adaptation of the manga, even incorporating redrawn stills from Yamato's original work (although the anime portrayed Benio with reddish-brown hair, and Yamato's colorized drawings often showed her as blonde).

The anime has been discovered by new audiences in the years since thanks to the enduring popularity of the original manga (as well as a live-action movie version of the story released in Japan in 1987). In 2005, Haikara-san ga Tooru was listed at #95 in a TV Asahi poll of the top 100 animation series of all time, based on a nationwide survey of Japanese of all age groups. The anime has also been aired across Japan by the anime satellite television network, Animax, and the NHK satellite channel BS2.

Both the manga and anime have also enjoyed considerable success in the European market. The manga was released in Italy in the late 1990s under the title Una ragazza alla moda (A Fashionable Girl). The anime was successful on Italian TV in 1986 under the title Mademoiselle Anne, and a French dub of the series, Marc et Marie, aired on French TV in 1995. The anime has also been dubbed into Arabic, under the title Beno (the Arabic name for Benio). Nippon Animation's official English title for the anime is Smart-san.

Two-part anime film adaptations have been announced with the first film being released in Japan on November 11, 2017, while the second film on October 19, 2018, covering the latter story of the original manga series, which was not told in the 42-episode anime television series in 1978–1979. Eleven Arts has released the first film in theaters in the U.S. and Canada and on Blu-ray in partnership with Right Stuf. The second film has also been licensed by Eleven Arts.

== 1978–1979 anime television series ==
- Director: Kazuyoshi Yokota
- Script: Nizo Takahashi
- Storyboards: Hiroshi Yoshida, Teppei Matsuura
- Music: Masuhiro Yamaguchi
- Original Story: Waki Yamato
- Character Design: Tsutomu Shibayama
- Animation Directors: Eiji Kawakita, Eiji Tanaka, Takashi Saijo, Tatsuhiro Nagaki, Yoshiyuki Kishi
- Background Art: Kazu Setouchi, Takafumi Kase
- Executive Producer: Koichi Motohashi
- Theme Songs: OP - Haikara-san ga Tōru, ED - Gokigen Ikaga? Benio desu, performed by Shosuke Sekita

The theme song for the late 1980s movie was performed by Yoko Minamino; it is a different song from that used in the anime series.

== 2017–2018 anime films ==
=== Staff ===
- Director: Kazuhiro Furuhashi (first film), Seimei Kidokoro (second film)
- Script: Kazuhiro Furuhashi
- Original Story: Waki Yamato
- Character Designer: Terumi Nishii
- Background Designer, Art Director: Kentaro Akiyama
- Color Designer: Kunio Tsujita
- Photography: Takeo Ogiwara (Graphinica)
- Sound Director: Kazuhiro Wakabayashi
- Music: Michiru Oshima
- Animation Production: Nippon Animation

=== Cast ===
Character	Japanese	English
Shinobu Ijuin	Mamoru Miyano	Robbie Daymond
Tosei Aoe	Takahiro Sakurai	Keith Silverstein
Major Hanamura	Unshō Ishizuka	Bill Rogers
Shingo Onijima	Kazuya Nakai	Kirk Thornton
Tamaki Kitaoji	Asami Seto	Cristina Vee
Benio Hanamura	Saori Hayami	Mimi Torres
Ranmaru Fujieda	Yuuki Kaji	Shannon McKain
Kichiji	Shizuka Ito	?
Larissa	Maaya Sakamoto	?

Saori Hayami performed the theme song "Yume no Hate Made" (夢の果てまで, lit. 'Until the End of the Dream'). Mariya Takeuchi composed the theme song and also wrote the lyrics, with arrangement by Takeshi Masuda. Hayami also performed the theme song for the second film, "Atarashii Ashita" (新しい朝(あした), lit. 'New Tomorrow'), also composed by Takeuchi.

== Takarazuka Revue ==
Naoko Koyanagi adapted the story for musical theatre for the all-female Takarazuka Revue. She directed the Flower Troupe in performances in October 2017 and July to November 2020. In both performances, Rei Yuzuka was cast as Shinobu Ijuin and Yuuki Hana was cast as the title role, Benio Hanamura. The 2020 performance was Rei Yuzuka's Grand Theater debut as top star of the Flower Troupe; while it was originally scheduled for March 2020, it was delayed and rescheduled due to government COVID-19 restrictions.
