= Shiratori Reiko de Gozaimasu! =

Japanese manga series

白鳥麗子でございます!
- Genre: Romantic comedy
- Manga
- Written by: Yumiko Suzuki
- Published by: Kodansha
- Magazine: Mimi
- Original run: 1988 – 1992
- Volumes: 7
- Original video animation
- Directed by: Mitsuru Hongo
- Written by: Taeko Okina
- Studio: Ajia-do
- Released: April 25, 1990
- Runtime: 40 minutes
- Television drama
- Directed by: Masayuki Suzuki, Hisao Ogura
- Written by: Miho Nakazono
- Original network: Fuji TV
- Original run: January 14, 1993 – February 11, 1993
- Episodes: 11
- Live-action film
- Directed by: Hisao Ogura
- Produced by: Tomoki Ikeda, Takashi Ishihara, Yuji Iwata, Shinichi Ogawa
- Written by: Kazuyuki Morosawa
- Released: August 19, 1995
- Runtime: 71 minutes
- Television drama
- Directed by: Shinji Kuma, Tatsuya Matsuoka, Keita Mizunami
- Original network: Nagoya TV
- Original run: January 18, 2016 – March 28, 2016
- Episodes: 10
- Live-action film
- Directed by: Shinji Kuma
- Produced by: Nobuaki Suzuki, Makoto Kimata, Naoki Fukuhara, Maki Uemara
- Written by: Shinji Kuma, Yosuke Otani
- Released: June 11, 2016
- Runtime: 92 minutes

Shiratori Reiko de Gozaimasu! (Japanese: 白鳥麗子でございます!; "I Am Reiko Shiratori!") is a shōjo romantic comedy manga by Yumiko Suzuki. It was published by Kodansha in the magazine Mimi from 1988 to 1992 and collected in seven tankōbon volumes.

The series was adapted as an anime OVA produced by Ajia-do that was released in 1990, an 11-episode live-action television series broadcast on Fuji TV in 1993, and a theatrical movie released in 1995. In 1989, the manga won the Kodansha Manga Award for shōjo.

It is the story of Reiko Shiratori, a nouveau-riche girl from the countryside, who enters a Tokyo university to pursue ordinary college student Tetsuya Akimoto.

== Television dramas ==
=== 1989 cast ===
- Honami Suzuki as Reiko Shiratori
- Makoto Nonomura as Tetsuya Akimoto

=== 1993 cast ===
- Yasuko Matsuyuki as Reiko Shiratori
- Masato Hagiwara as Tetsuya Akimoto

=== 2016 cast ===
- Mayuko Kawakita as Reiko Shiratori
- Masaru Mizuno as Tetsuya Akimoto

== Original video animation ==
=== Cast ===
- Maria Kawamura as Reiko Shiratori
- Kenyu Horiuchi as Tetsuya Akimoto
