= Glass Mask =

Japanese manga series

- Cover of the first tankōbon volume, featuring Maya Kitajima

ガラスの仮面 (Garasu no Kamen)
- Genre: Romance, drama
- Manga
- Written by: Suzue Miuchi
- Published by: Hakusensha
- Magazine: Hana to Yume; Bessatsu Hana to Yume (defunct)
- Original run: January 1976 – (on hiatus since 2012)
- Volumes: 49
- Anime television series
- Directed by: Gisaburō Sugii (Chief); Yūsaku Sakamoto; Toshitaka Tsunoda
- Produced by: Hidehiko Takei; Masanobu Shimoda; Tatsuya Ono
- Music by: Kazuo Otani
- Studio: Eiken
- Licensed by: NA: Maiden Japan
- Original network: NTV
- Original run: April 9, 1984 – September 27, 1984
- Episodes: 22
- Television drama
- Directed by: Toshinori Nishimae; Kazuhisa Imai; Noboru Yagiyama
- Produced by: Ryuichi Sato; Satoko Uchiyama; Keijo Miruta; Katsunori Motonobu; Motoi Sasaki (Assistant, season 1); Shinichiro Shirakura (Assistant, season 2)
- Written by: Fumie Mizuhashi; Miyuki Noyori; Michiru Egashira
- Music by: TEAM B'z
- Studio: TV Asahi; G・Company
- Original network: ANN (TV Asahi)
- Original run: 1997 – 1999
- Episodes: 23 + 1 special
- Original video animation

Glass no Kamen: Sen no Kamen o Motsu Shoujo
- Directed by: Tsuneo Kobayashi
- Written by: Nobuaki Kishima; Yoshiyuki Suga; Tomoko Konparu
- Music by: Tamiya Terashima
- Studio: TMS Entertainment
- Released: December 16, 1998 – April 21, 1999
- Runtime: 48 minutes
- Episodes: 3
- Anime television series
- Directed by: Mamoru Hamatsu
- Produced by: Shinsaku Hatta; Tadahito Matsumoto
- Written by: Toshimichi Saeki
- Music by: Tamiya Terashima
- Studio: TMS Entertainment
- Licensed by: NA: Sentai Filmworks
- Original network: TV Tokyo
- Original run: April 6, 2005 – March 29, 2006
- Episodes: 51

Glass Mask (Japanese: ガラスの仮面, Hepburn: Garasu no Kamen) is a Japanese shōjo manga series written and illustrated by Suzue Miuchi, serialized in Hana to Yume from January 1976, and collected in 49 tankōbon volumes as of October 2012. The story has also been adapted into anime and a live-action television series.

As of 2006, the collected volumes had sold 50 million copies in Japan, making it the second best-selling shōjo manga ever. In 2005, Oricon ranked the series in 8th place out of 10 shōjo manga.

== Plot ==
Glass Mask is a saga depicting the devotion of Maya Kitajima to the performing arts as a professional stage actress, and her competition with her skilled rival, Ayumi Himekawa. They are both pursuing the degree of acting proficiency and career success required to play the lead role of the legendary stage play "The Crimson Goddess" ("Kurenai Tennyo"). Maya is not particularly beautiful or smart in school, but her passion for acting is all-consuming, to the point where she literally puts her own life on the line several times for the sake of a role. Always told by her mother that she was good for nothing, Maya wants to prove to the world and to herself that she has worth. On the other hand, everyone expects the gifted and multi-talented Ayumi to succeed, so she is determined to reach the top on her own without the help of her prestigious parents.

As the story unfolds it encompasses the tangled human relationships of many characters, including Maya's mentor, Chigusa Tsukikage, who discovered Maya's tremendous talent for acting during her search for a successor capable of performing the role of "The Crimson Goddess", and Masumi Hayami, the young president of Daito, who often interacts with Maya as a crafty and cold-hearted entrepreneur, while giving her faithful support and warm encouragement in the disguise of an anonymous fan ("The Purple Rose Person", or "murasaki no bara no hito" as Maya calls him for his trademark gift of purple roses). Hajime Onodera, a director for Daito, wants the rights to "Kurenai Tennyo", which were given to Tsukikage by the playwright; since Tsukikage refuses to sell him the rights, Onodera tries to drive Tsukikage's acting school out of business through a series of nefarious schemes. Since Onodera is working for Hayami, Maya (unaware that Hayami is "The Purple Rose") hates him. Though there is an age difference of eleven years, Masumi falls in love with Maya and gives her encouragement in subtle ways.

== Characters ==
- Maya Kitajima (北島 マヤ, Kitajima Maya). A talented young actress (a 13-year-old at the beginning of the story) who originally worked as a waitress in a Chinese restaurant alongside her mother. Her father died when she was a little girl and her mother, Haru, who is mentally unstable, considers Maya useless due to Maya's tendency to be sidetracked by anything to do with acting while in the middle of working. She is discovered by the former diva Chigusa Tsukikage and starts a promising, yet thorny acting career under the older woman's wing. Her mother discourages her daughter from an acting career, believing that her daughter would be a laughingstock. She even refused to attend a school play Maya was in because Maya's role was that of a pitiful and wretched minor character. So Maya gave the role more depth and sadness to a character who was originally meant to be portrayed as laughable and pathetic. Later on, Maya is given the opportunity to make a living as an actress. Tsukikage cuts off Maya's ties with her mother, making the decision of becoming an actress. However, Maya is consistently given encouragement through an anonymous fan who sends her a bouquet of purple roses which is none other than Hayami Masumi, whom Maya shows an immense hatred towards, especially since he took malicious enjoyment in bringing down Tsukikage's acting school. A few years later, Haru dies of tuberculosis and blindness, traumatizing Maya for many weeks.

Maya's talent for acting comes from both her natural skill and emotional personality, unlike Ayumi whose skills are more technically driven; in fact, Maya practically 'becomes' her characters when she plays, so brutal her training methods are and so intensely she performs. During the beginning of her training sessions, Maya has always displayed unconventional performances of the assigned tasks, such as laying on the floor to "sit on" a toppled chair. People often note how unremarkable Maya is until she takes the stage. In fact, the prodigy actress Ayumi comments that Maya knows how to captivate the audience, even though she isn't aware of doing so. Despite having enormous potential and raw talent, Maya often doesn't recognize her abilities. She thinks of herself as unremarkable and "useless", as her mother constantly referred to her as, though she is compelled to pursue a career in acting because "acting is all she has". She also harbors moments of inferiority in comparison to Ayumi, who is beautiful, talented, and rich. Despite all this, Maya doesn't harbor any malice or ill will toward Ayumi, though Ayumi is secretly competitive toward Maya. Maya has three nicknames. One is "The Stage Storm", referring to her innate ability to drown out other actors' importance in a play even while in a bit part. Tsukikage refers to Maya as "the girl with a thousand masks" in tribute to her versatility whenever taking on character roles. And she is addressed as "little child" (ちびちゃん, Chibi-chan) by Masumi Hayami, a diminutive nickname he's given to her due to their broad disparity in age and height, to satirize her naivete, and eventually out of true affection.

- Ayumi Himekawa (姫川 亜弓, Himekawa Ayumi) Maya's biggest rival, the honor-bound and noble Ayumi was born as the daughter of a very famous actress, Utako Himekawa (once the student of Tsukikage) and a successful director and producer, Mitsugu Himekawa, and has been touted as a prodigy from an early age. Ever since learning she got her first acting role just because of her family links, Ayumi has striven to shine on her own and never falls into arrogance. Ayumi becomes aware of Maya's prodigious gift for acting when they first meet in a practice session; from then on she views the younger girl as a life-rival. She is ambitious enough to try to surpass her own mother, who is a widely recognized actress. People have jokingly told Utako that her daughter will steal the role of the Crimson Goddess from her. Even though Ayumi is young, she believes that she will re-vitalize the renowned role. Thus, she takes it upon herself to get as much experience as she can by trying out for any roles, including minor ones. At first, when Ayumi took on the role of Tom in The Prince and the Pauper, the children in attendance didn't like the performance because they were used to seeing Ayumi as a beautiful young woman rather than a dirty and homely boy. Yet Ayumi soon draws the children's favor by begging for "money" in a hat, to which the children offer her their candy. The people behind the stage were surprised that Ayumi would do such a thing, particularly since Ayumi generally would have thought such things beneath her. Her passion to become the Crimson Goddess is undeniable, however, as she continually strives for perfection to attain the role. Even though critics generally favour her over Maya, Ayumi is upset at being unable to reach the sort of emotional peaks Maya does when she performs.
- Chigusa Tsukikage (月影 千草, Tsukikage Chigusa) Maya's mentor and a former street urchin. She once was a very talented and beloved actress, most notable for her role at the legendary play "Crimson Goddess" (紅天女, Kunenai-Tennyo) whose performance was so acclaimed that its author left the rights over it solely to her in his will, but she got horribly scarred in an onstage accident (a lamp lighter hit her and burned half her face off) and had to leave the acting scene, opening an acting school instead. She has very weak health and is hospitalized several times during the story. Yet she is a woman of unstoppable will, refusing to give the rights of "The Crimson Goddess" to Masumi Hayami and his father, as according to her, currently there is not an actress suitable for the main role. After finding potential in Maya, she takes her under her wing despite her mother's objections and strives to shape her into the best actress ever, so she can contest with Ayumi for the leading role in "The Crimson Goddess". Tsukikage understands that an actress's face is her most important feature, and she covers Maya when Maya's incensed mother tries to throw a kettle in her daughter's face.
- Masumi Hayami (速水 真澄, Hayami Masumi) An abused stepson of the president of the Daito Entertainments (大都芸能). His real father died by accidentally falling off a building when he was 2 years old. He is brutally attempting to obtain the performance rights for "The Crimson Goddess" from Chigusa, efforts which ultimately led to her acting school burned. When he sees Maya act as Beth in "Little Women" despite a high fever, he is impressed with her strong will and devotion to her acting dreams. He secretly sends her purple roses and financial support as encouragement (thus Maya refers to her anonymous fan as "The Purple Roses Man"; her friends call him Daddy Long-Legs), but acts mocking, cynical and even cruel in front of her to conceal his anonymous identity. Originally a normal, happy child, his cold exterior grew from the death of his mother, Aya, when he was a child, and his bad relationship with his stepfather Eisuke, who murdered the Crimson Goddess' author. As the manga proceeds, he becomes more and more infatuated with Maya and finally falls deeply in love with her. He doesn't reveal either his alternate identity or his true feelings for many reasons, one of which is the belief that Maya hates him since he indirectly caused her mother's death.

== Manga ==
Written and illustrated by Suzue Miuchi, Glass Mask began serialization in 1975 in Hakusensha's Hana to Yume magazine. After not publishing a new chapter of the story for more than two years, Miuchi re-launched Glass Mask in Hakusensha's Bessatsu Hana to Yume magazine in July 2008. Miuchi announced in 2009 that she intended to end the series "soon", however, it is currently on an extended hiatus, with the latest chapter released in October 2012, the 50th volume of the series has also been indefinitely delayed. In 2014, Miuchi announced that she is getting closer to the ending of the series. After Bessatsu Hana to Yume ended publication in 2018, Miuchi announced that she still intends to complete the series.

When asked about the potential of an English release in 2019, Miuchi stated that she hadn't signed any contracts with an English publisher, she stated that she knew that English readers were likely pirating the series in order to read it, which gave her mixed feelings, however, knowing that the Italian releases of the series was available in other nations, her skepticism didn't apply to all international readers.

Glass Mask has been published Italy by Star Comics, and in Taiwan by Tong Li Publishing.

No.	Release date	ISBN
1	March 19, 1976	4-592-11091-9
2	June 19, 1976	4-592-11092-7
3	January 20, 1977	4-592-11093-5
4	April 20, 1977	4-592-11094-3
5	July 20, 1977	4-592-11095-1
6	September 20, 1977	4-592-11096-X
7	January 20, 1978	4-592-11097-8
8	May 20, 1978	4-592-11098-6
9	August 19, 1978	4-592-11099-4
10	December 20, 1978	4-592-11100-1
11	March 20, 1979	4-592-11101-X
12	July 20, 1979	4-592-11102-8
13	November 20, 1979	4-592-11103-6
14	April 19, 1970	4-592-11104-4
15	June 20, 1980	4-592-11105-2
16	August 20, 1980	4-592-11106-0
17	November 20, 1980	4-592-11107-9
18	February 20, 1981	4-592-11108-7
19	May 20, 1981	4-592-11109-5
20	September 19, 1981	4-592-11110-9
21	December 16, 1981	4-592-11111-7
22	March 20, 1982	4-592-11112-5
23	July 20, 1982	4-592-11113-3
24	October 20, 1982	4-592-11114-1
25	April 20, 1983	4-592-11115-X
26	June 18, 1983	4-592-11116-8
27	November 19, 1983	4-592-11117-6
28	March 19, 1984	4-592-11118-4
29	August 17, 1984	4-592-11119-2
30	February 19, 1985	4-592-11120-6
31	August 19, 1985	4-592-11121-4
32	June 19, 1986	4-592-11122-2
33	March 19, 1987	4-592-11123-0
34	November 19, 1987	4-592-11124-9
35	August 26, 1988	4-592-11125-7
36	September 26, 1989	4-592-11126-5
37	October 19, 1990	4-592-11127-3
38	March 30, 1992	4-592-11128-1
39	October 19, 1992	4-592-11129-X
40	September 17, 1993	4-592-11130-3
41	December 22, 1998	4-592-17001-6
42	December 16, 2004	4-592-17002-4
43	January 26, 2009	978-4-592-17003-7
44	August 26, 2009	978-4-592-17004-4
45	September 30, 2010	978-4-592-17005-1
46	October 29, 2010	978-4-592-17006-8
47	July 26, 2011	978-4-592-17007-5
48	February 25, 2012	978-4-592-17008-2
49	October 5, 2012	978-4-592-17009-9

== Anime ==
There have been several anime adaptations since the manga began its serialization. The first adaptation was a 22-episode TV series produced by Eiken in 1984 which was directed by Gisaburō Sugii with animation contributions from Shingo Araki and Michi Himeno (for the opening) and character designs by Makoto Kuniyasu. The main voice cast featured Masako Katsuki as Maya Kitajima, Taeko Nakanishi as Chigusa Tsukikage, Minori Matsushima as Ayumi Himekawa and Nachi Nozawa (and later Katsuji Mori from episode 19 onwards) as Masumi Hayami. The opening and ending theme, Garasu no Kamen (ガラスの仮面; Glass Mask) and Pāpuru Raito (パープル・ライト; Purple Light) was performed by Mariko Ashibe. This adaptation was broadcast by Nippon TV. The series was licensed by Maiden Japan in May 2018. The series was added to HIDIVE on May 28, 2018.

A three episode OVA, titled as Garasu no Kamen: Sen no Kamen o Motsu Shōjo (ガラスの仮面 千の仮面を持つ少女; Glass Mask: The Girl Who Wears A Thousand Masks), was the remake of the first 3 arcs of the manga series. The OVA was released by TMS Entertainment in 1998. The voice cast from the 1984 series was not used and instead featured Megumi Ogata as Maya Kitajima, Keiko Toda as Chigusa Tsukikage, Naoko Matsui as Ayumi Himekawa and Jūrōta Kosugi as Masumi Hayami. The OVA was directed by Tsuneo Kobayashi with scripts written by Nobuaki Kishima, Tomoko Konparu and Yoshiyuki Suga as well as animation character designs by Satoshi Hirayama and Masako Gouto.

In 2005, TMS Entertainment, the company who produced the OVA began a TV series which was directed by Mamoru Hamatsu with series composition done by Toshimichi Saeki, animation character designs by Satoshi Hirayama and music composed by Tamiya Terashima. This adaptation was broadcast by TV Tokyo and there were 2 opening themes, Promise which was performed by Candy for episodes 1–26 and zero by Aiko Ikuta for episodes 27–51. There were 4 ending themes which were Yasashii Sayonara (やさしいさよなら; A Kind Farewell) for episodes 1–13 by Aina, Step One by Sister Q for episodes 14–24, Sunao ni Narenakute (素直になれなくて; I Couldn't Be Honest With You) by Splash Candy for episodes 27–39 and Hello Hello by Core of Soul for episodes 40–51. Like the other adaptations, the voice cast was not reused and Maya Kitajima was voiced by Sanae Kobayashi, Chigusa Tsukikage by Toshiko Fujita, Akiko Yajima as Ayumi Himekawa and Masumi Hayami was voiced by Toshiyuki Morikawa. The original voice actor for Maya Kitajima in the 1984 adaptation returned to voice Ayumi's mother, Utako Himekawa.

The 2005 adaptation was licensed in North America by Sentai Filmworks, and distributed by Section23 Films. The first half of the season was released on DVD, on January 19, 2010; however, the second half of the season has been cancelled reportedly due to low sales.

In 2013, a 17-episode short flash series was launched by DLE. The series reimagined Maya and Ayumi as a pair of rival delinquent girls vying to become the new leader of the Crimson Goddess gang.

In 2016, a 13-episode parody version, which "re-imagines the manga and its characters in a school gag comedy focused on satirizing modern society", and with the title 3-Nen D-Gumi Glass no Kamen (3ねんDぐみガラスの仮面; The Glass Mask Year 3 Class D), was broadcast on Tokyo MX starting on October 3. A film based on the anime titled, 3-Nen D-Gumi Glass no Kamen ~Tobidase Watashi-tachi no VR (Victory Road)~ (3ねんDぐみガラスの仮面～とびだせ私たちのVR; The Glass Mask Year 3 Class D ~Fly, Our VR), premiered on July 22, 2017, as a "VR film" where the characters were projected onto a stage using live holographic technology.

== Film ==
In 2013, an animated film dubbed It's Glass Mask But... the Movie: Female Spy's Love! The Purple Rose Has a Dangerous Scent!? (ガラスの仮面ですが THE MOVIE 女スパイの恋! 紫のバラは危険な香り!?, Garasu no Kamen desu ga THE MOVIE: Onna Supai no Koi! Murasaki no Bara wa Kiken na Kaori!?) was released. Like the flash series, the film was a parody which reimagined Maya and Ayumi as a pair of students who become junior spies after their mentor, Chigusa, is kidnapped.

== Live-action ==
A live-action version adapted the first 38 volumes of the series in 1997, and continued in 1998 as "Garasu no Kamen 2." Both productions starred Yumi Adachi as Maya Kitajima.

=== Cast ===
- Yumi Adachi as Maya Kitajima
- Seiichi Tanabe as Masumi Hayami
- Megumi Matsumoto (Aimi Nakamura in the special) as Ayumi Himekawa
- Kenji Kohashi as Yū Sakurakōji
- Kazuko Katō as Utako Himekawa
- Kenta Satoi as Hajime Onodera
- Kyōko Togawa as Saeko Mizuki
- Naomasa Musaka as Genzō Kobayashi
- Kaya Saeki as Shiori Takamiya
- Hinako Saeki as Suzuko Tashiro (Norie Otobe)
- Mariko Fuji as Haru Kitajima
- Yōko Nogiwa as Chigusa Tsukikage

Season 2

- Yasutaka Tsutsui as Eisuke Hayami
- Yūichi Haba as Ryūzō Kuronuma
- Gamon Kaai as Takuya Kazama

== Spinoff – The Crimson Goddess ==
The play within Glass Mask, the Crimson Goddess, will be adapted in 2020 as a "creative opera".
