= Kousuke Atari =

Japanese pop singer

Kousuke Atari 中 孝介
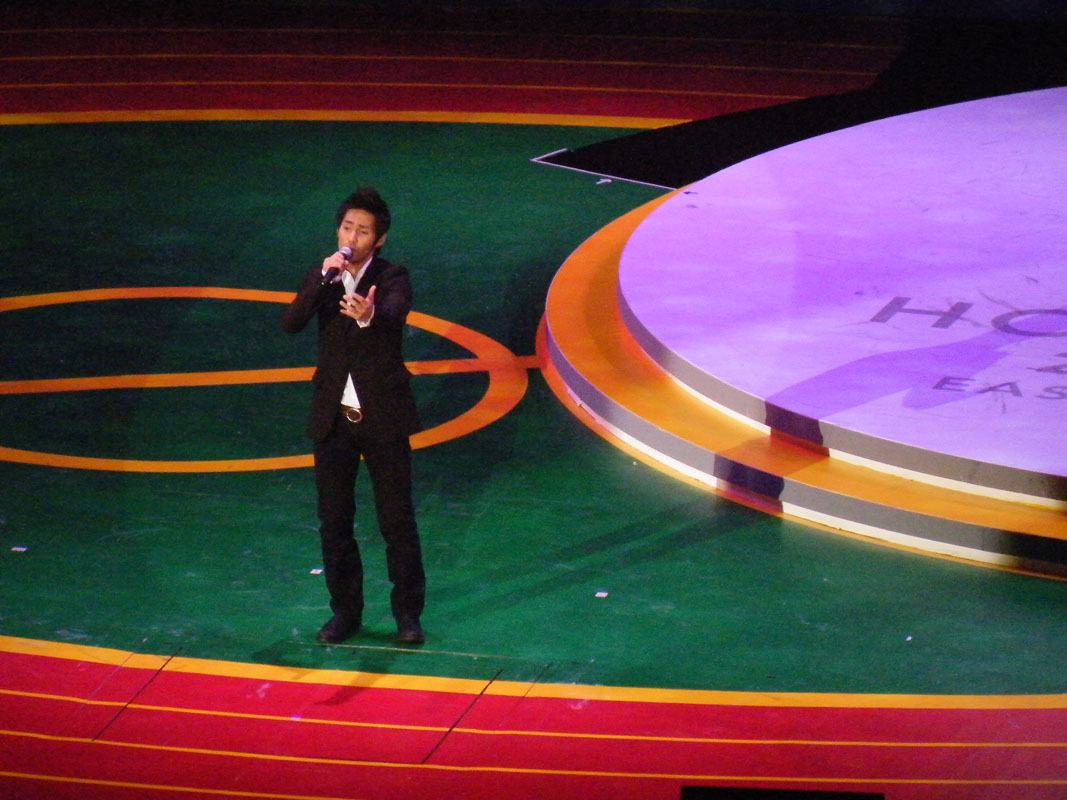

Background information
- Born: 13 July 1980 (age 46); Naze, Kagoshima, Japan
- Genres: Shimauta, J-Pop
- Occupations: Singer, actor
- Instrument: Vocals
- Years active: 1999–present
- Label: Epic
- Website: atarikblog.exblog.jp

Kousuke Atari (中 孝介, Atari Kōsuke; born 13 July 1980) is a Japanese pop singer. He is a self-trained musician, and performs in the shimauta (island-song) style of his hometown.

== Discography ==
=== Albums ===
- 1999: Atari (アタリ) (Indies)
- 2000: Kurudando (くるだんど) (Indies)
- 2002: Shodon (諸鈍; Place Name) (Indies)
- 2004: Notus (ノトス) (Indies)
- 2006: Chu Dong Xin Xian (触動心弦; Touch Strings of Your Heart)
- 2007: Yurai Bana (ユライ花; The First Flower)
- 2007: Hua Jian Dao (花間道; Road Between Flowers)
- 2008: Kizuna Utav (絆歌; Bond Songs)

=== Mini-Albums ===
- 2005: Materia (マテリヤ) (Indies)
- 2006: Natsukasha no Shima (なつかしゃのシマ; The Island I Miss)

=== Singles ===
- 2006: "Sorezore ni" ("それぞれに"; "In Each and Every")
- 2006: Omoide no Sugu Soba de / Mahiru no Hanabi ("思い出のすぐそばで / 真昼の花火"; "Right Next to Memories / Midday Fireworks")
- 2007: "Hana" ("花"; "Flower")
- 2007: "Tane wo Maku Hibi" ("種をまく日々"; "The Days When Seeds are Scattered")
- 2008: "Haru" ("春"; "Spring")
- 2008: "Kizuna" ("絆"; "Bonds")
- 2009: "Koi" ("恋"; "Love")

=== Collaborations/Other ===
- 2002: Various Artists – Amami Shima Uta (#2. "Asabanabushi", #9. "Kurudando", #13. "Rankanhashi")
- 2004: Various Artists – Okinawa Songs ~Watashita Uta~(#14. "IRAYOI Tsukiyo Hama")
- 2005: Masayoshi Yamazaki Tribute Album – One More Time, One More Track (#3. "HOME")
- 2008: Van Fan & Kousuke Atari - Cape No.7 OST ("Heidenröslein")

== Films ==
- Cape No. 7 (2008) – Teacher / Himself – Singer
- "Taipei Exchanges" (2010) – Singing Customer/ Tourist
- "Happiness Me Too" (2012)

== Trivia ==
- The song "Natsu Yuuzora (夏夕空; Summer Evening Sky)" was used as the ending theme in the Japanese anime adaptation of the manga series Natsume Yuujinchou. He also performed the song "Kimi no Kakera (君ノカケラ; Pieces of You)" which was used in the third season.
- The single "Tane wo Maku Hibi (種をまく日々; The Days When Seeds are Scattered)" was used as the thirteenth ending theme in the anime series Bleach.
- The single "Koi (恋; Love)" was used as the ending theme in the anime series Genji Monogatari Sennenki.
