= Kumakawa =

Kumakawa (written: 熊川 lit. "bear river") is a Japanese surname. Notable people with the surname include:

- Eriko Kumakawa (熊川 恵利子, born c. 1971), Japanese Paralympic goalball player
- Tetsuya Kumakawa (熊川 哲也, born 1972), Japanese ballet dancer
