= Suzue Miuchi =

Japanese manga artist

Suzue Miuchi 美内 すずえ
- Born: February 20, 1951 (age 75) Nishi-ku, Osaka, Japan
- Areas: Writer, Penciller, Inker
- Notable works: Glass Mask
- Awards: 1982 Kodansha Manga Award; 1995 Japan Cartoonists Association Award

Suzue Miuchi (美内 すずえ, Miuchi Suzue; born February 20, 1951) is a Japanese manga artist and author of long-running shōjo manga Glass Mask.

== Life ==
She was born in Nishinomiya, Japan and grew up in Osaka. She lived nearby a rental bookstore (kashi-hon) in her childhood and started drawing manga herself, when she had too many unpaid bills at a rental bookstore and her mother forbid her to continue reading manga. Miuchi made her professional debut as a manga artist in 1967, aged only 16, with the manga Yama no Tsuki to Kodanuki in the shōjo magazine Bessatsu Margaret. Her early debut as a highschool-aged manga artist inspired Yukari Ichijo to start a professional career as a manga artist at the time. She became famous for publishing short stories in the early 1970s, among them also horror manga. Her 1975 short story Shiroi Kagebōshi is considered a classic of shōjo horror manga.

Her biggest success came in 1976, when she began the long-running series Glass Mask about a girl becoming a famous theater actress. The manga has been adapted into a stage play, a live-action TV series and two anime series. She continued publishing Glass Mask until 2012, when she went on hiatus with the series.

She won the Kodansha Manga Award (1982) for Yōkihi-den and the Japan Cartoonists Association Award (1995) for Glass Mask.

== Works ==
=== Series ===
- Moeru Niji (燃える虹), 1970
- 13-gatsu no Higeki (13月の悲劇), 1971
- Amaranth no Joō (アマランスの女王), 1972
- Harukanaru Kaze to Hikari (はるかなる風と光), 1973–1974
- Kujaku-iro no Kanaria (孔雀色のカナリア), 1973–1974
- Shira-yuri no Kishi (白ゆりの騎士), 1974–1975
- Glass Mask (ガラスの仮面, Garasu no Kamen), 1976–1997, 2008–2012, serialized in Hana to Yume and Bessatsu Hana to Yume
- Saint Alice Teikoku (聖アリス帝国, Sei-Arisu Teikoku), 1976–1978
- Bara Monogatari (バラ物語), 1979
- Yōkihi-den (妖鬼妃伝), 1981
- Dynamite Milk Pie (ダイナマイト・みるく・パイ, Dainamaito Miruku Pai), 1982
- Amaterasu (アマテラス), 1986–2001

=== One-shots ===
- Yama no Tsuki to Kodanuki to (山の月とこだぬきと), 1967
- Shiroi Kagebōshi (白い影法師), 1975, published in Mimi
- Dynamite Milkpie
- Futari no Melody
- Kaerazaru Hyuuga
- Majou Medea
- Niji no Ikusa
- Oujo Alexandra
- Pollyana's Knight
- Shiroi Kageboshi
