= S.E.N.S. =

Japanese new-age instrumental group

- Origin: Japan
- Genres: New-age; ambient; soundtrack
- Years active: 1988-present
- Label: Sony Music
- Members: Akihiko Fukaura (深浦 昭彥): Yukari Katsuki (勝木 ゆかり)
- Website: www.sens-company.com

S.E.N.S. (センス) is a Japanese new-age instrumental group formed in 1988, originally with two members. The name stands for "Sound, Earth, Nature, and Spirit" based on their spiritual policy.

They have produced many musical scores for TV dramas, documentaries, and movies in Japan, also making it into the anime scene with the score for xxxHolic.

Their albums have also been released in European and Asian countries.

In Japan, the album Tomei na Ongaku (透明な音楽, Transparent Music) was awarded second prize for "Instrumental Album of the Year" in the 2001 Japan Gold Disc Award.。

== Members ==
Logo

- Akihiko Fukaura: Keyboards and programming
- Yukari Katsuki: Vocal, piano and programming

== Works ==
=== TV drama ===
- Gorilla – Keishicho Sousadaihappan (ゴリラ・警視庁捜査第8班 / 1989)
- Chushingura – TBS 40th anniversary drama (忠臣蔵 – TBS開局40周年記念ドラマ / 1990)
- Turn Around and That Guy'll Be There (振り返れば奴がいる / 1993)
- Asunaro Hakusho (あすなろ白書 / 1993)
- Deatta Koro No Kimi De Ite (出逢った頃の君でいて / 1994)
- Kagayaku Kisetsu No Nakade (輝く季節の中で / 1995)
- Mrs. Cinderella (ミセスシンデレラ / 1997)
- Aoi Tori (青い鳥 Blue Bird / 1997)
- Kamisama, Mo Sukoshi Dake (神様、もう少しだけ God, Just a Little More / 1998)
- Sotsugyo Ryoko (卒業旅行 / 1999)
- P.S. Genki desu, Shunpei (P.S. 元気です、俊平, P.S. I'm Fine, Shunpei / 1999)
- Nisen-nen no Koi (二千年の恋 Love 2000 / 2000)
- Yanagibashi Bojou (柳橋慕情 / 2000)
- MARIA (マリア / 2001)
- Beautiful Days (美しき日々 / 2001)
- Satomi Hakken Den – TBS 50th anniversary project (里見八犬伝 / 2006)
- Yakusya Damashii! (役者魂！ / 2006)
- Last Friends (ラストフレンズ / 2008)
- Aishiteru – Kaiyo (アイシテル – 海容 / 2008)
- Tenshi no dairinin (天使の代理人 / 2010)
- Aishiteru – Kizuna (アイシテル – 絆 / 2011)
- Kyogu – ABC 60th anniversary special drama (境遇 – ABC創立60周年記念スペシャルドラマ / 2011)
- Yoake No lullaby (夜明けのララバイ / 2012)
- Boku no Natsuyasumi (僕の夏休み / 2012)
- Ao No Umi – LONG SUMMER - (碧の海 – LONG SUMMER – / 2014)
- Sparrow (麻雀 / 2016 / Chinese drama)
- The Glory of Tang Dynasty (大唐荣耀 / 2017)
- The Advisors Alliance (大军师司马懿之军师联盟 / 2017)
- Totto-Chan ! (トットちゃん！/ 2017)
- Growling Tiger, Roaring Dragon (虎嘯龍吟 / 2017)
- The Smiling, Proud Wanderer (新笑傲江湖 / 2018)

=== TV documentary ===
- NHK Special Umi No Silk Road (NHK特集 海のシルクロード / 1988)
- NHK Special Chikyu Osen (NHK特集 地球汚染 / 1989)
- NHK Special Ningen Ha Nani Wo Tabetekita Ka (NHKスペシャル 人間は何を食べてきたか / 1900)
- MBS 40th anniversary Program – Shin Beagle-Go Tankenki (MBS40周年記念番組 新ビーグル号探検記 New Beagle Explorational Journal / 1991)
- TBS Yomigaeru Ougon No Miyako Shikan (TBS 蘇る黄金の都シカン / 1994)
- TBS 40th Anniversary Special Project – Nihonkai Daikikou (TBS40周年特別企画 日本海大紀行 / 1995)
- NHK Special Kokyu – Shihou Ga Kataru Chuka Gosen-nen - (NHKスペシャル 故宮 – 至宝が語る中華五千年 – / 1996)
- NHK Kokyo No Shihou (NHK 故宮の至宝 / 1997)
- TBS The 21st Century Project Kokyu Daiensei – Chugoku Koutei No Hihou 10,000 km No Tabi (TBS21世紀プロジェクト 故宮大遠征 – 中国皇帝の秘宝 – 10000キロの旅 / 1999)
- NHK Nippon Kawa Kikou (NHK にっぽん川紀行 / 1998)
- NHK Asia Ningen Kaidou (NHK アジア人間街道 / 2001)
- FujiTV Echika No Kagami – Kokoro Ni Kiku TV - (フジテレビ系 エチカの鏡 – ココロにキクTV – /2008–2009)
- NHK ASIAN PASSION – Asia Wo Kakeru Nihonjin – (NHK ASIAN PASSION – アジアを駆ける日本人 – / 2010 – )
- NHK Umi To Ikiru (NHK 海と生きる / 2013)
- NHK Gurutto Setouchi No Tabi (NHK ぐるっと瀬戸内の旅 / 2013)
- Roof of the World (中国CCTV 第三极 / 2015)
- The Land of Spirits (中国bilibili 众神之地 / 2022)

=== TV commercial ===
- Onward Kashiyama – KUMIKYOKU - (オンワード樫山 – 組曲 – / 1993, 1998)
- Sagami – I, KIMONO - (さが美 – I, KIMONO – / 1994, 1995)
- KIRIN Seagram – Chivas Regal - (キリンシーグラム – シーバスリーガル – / 1995)
- Ajinomoto – Company Commercial - (味の素 企業CM / 2000)
- J-PHONE Tokai (J-PHONE 東海 / 2001)
- KATAOKA – MON CAFE - (片岡物産 MON CAFE / 2003, 2004)
- Tokyo Gas – company commercial - (東京ガス 企業CM / 2005)
- Take and Give. Needs – House Wedding - (テイクアンドギヴ・ニーズ ハウスウェディング / 2005, 2006)
- Kibun – Osechi - (紀文 おせち料理 / 2005, 2006, 2007)

=== Movie ===
- A City of Sadness (悲情城市 / 1989)
- Ichigensan (いちげんさん / 2000)
- All About My Dog series (いぬのえいがシリーズ / 2005, 2011)
- Shissou (疾走 / 2005)
- Mezamashi TV Nyanko The Movie (めざましテレビ にゃんこ THE MOVIE / 2006)
- Shikyuu No Kioku Koko Ni Anata Ga Iru (子宮の記憶 ここにあなたがいる / 2007)
- Mezamashi TV Nyanko The Movie 2 (めざましテレビ にゃんこ THE MOVIE 2 / 2007)
- Crossing Over (日中合作映画 鳳凰 わが愛 / 2007 / Japan and China collaboration movie)
- Mezamashi TV Nyanko The Movie 3 (めざましテレビ にゃんこ THE MOVIE 3 / 2009)
- Mezamashi TV Nyanko The Movie 4 (めざましテレビ にゃんこ THE MOVIE 4 / 2010)
- The Warring States (日中韓合作映画 戦国 / 2011 / Japan, China, and Korea collaboration movie)
- Little Ghostly Adventures of the Tofu Boy (豆富小僧 Tōfu Kozō / 2011)
- Mezamashi TV Nyanko The Movie 5 (めざましテレビ にゃんこ THE MOVIE 5 / 2012)
- Time Raiders (中国映画 盗墓筆記 タイム・レイダース / 2016 / Chinese Movie)
- Born in 2000 (中国映画 零零后 / 2019 / Chinese Movie)

=== TV animation ===
- The Wonderful Galaxy of Oz (スペースオズの冒険 / 1992)
- KURAU Phantom Memory (2004)
- xxxHolic (×××HOLiC / 2006)
- xxxHolic: Kei (×××HOLiC◆継 / 2008)
- Genji Monogatari Sennenki (源氏物語千年紀 Genji / 2009)
- Kimi ni Todoke (君に届け / 2009)
- Kimi ni Todoke 2nd Season (君に届け 2ND SEASON / 2011)
- Dededen (西武鉄道100周年、トムス・エンタテインメント50周年記念 – でででん – / 2015)
- My Love Story!! (俺物語!! / 2015)
- Space Battleship Yamato 2202: Warriors of Love Ending Song of Chapter 2～6 (「宇宙戦艦ヤマト2202 愛の戦士たち」第二～六章 エンディング主題歌 / 2017～2018)
- Kimi ni Todoke 3rd Season (君に届け 3RD SEASON / 2024)

=== Others ===
- Stage Drama – Kaijin Bessou – (舞台 – 海神別荘 – / 1994)
- – KENZO collection – Music Produce (KENZOコレクション / 音楽プロデュース / 1997)
- – Koibumi / Hiroko Yakushimaru – Produce (薬師丸ひろ子 – 恋文 – / 音楽プロデュース / 1997)
- Tokyo Dome – Colosseum 2000 – Theme Song (東京ドーム – コロシアム2000 – テーマ曲 / 2000)
- Beijing Olympics – Opening Theme of Unveiling ceremony of Symbol (北京オリンピックシンボルマーク除幕式オープニングテーマ / 2003)
- – I'm Remembering Me / Hanayo – Produce (花世 – I'm Remembering Me – / プロデュース / 2005)
- – Bokura no Ao Setouchi no Uta / Ayaka Hirahara – Produce (平原綾香 – 僕らの青~ 瀬戸内の詩 ~ / プロデュース / 2013)

== Discography ==
=== Singles ===
No.	Title	Release date	Notes
1	Kaishin (海神 The God of the Sea)	February 25, 1988	
2	APHRODITE	July 25, 1988	
3	Hijo Joshi (悲情城市 A City of Sadness)	April 25, 1990	
4	Hito to Toki to Kaze no Naka e (人と時と風の中へ Winds of Time)	March 5, 1993	
5	Kaze no You ni (風のように Like the Wind)	November 1, 1993	
6	I'KIMONO	April 25, 1994	
7	Kagayaku Toki no Naka de (輝く季節の中で In the Shining Season)	May 25, 1995	
8	Remembering Me	June 21, 1995	
9	Kokyu (故宮)	April 25, 1996	
10	Flying	June 4, 1997	
11	L'oiseau Bleu	November 21, 1997	
12	Kumikyoku - Yasashisa no Sentaku (組曲 - やさしさの選択 Suite - the Choice of Gentleness)	March 21, 1998	
13	Wish	August 21, 1998	
14	Fine	July 23, 1999	
15	Forbidden Love	February 23, 2000	
16	MARIA	July 25, 2001	

=== Albums ===
No.	Title	Release date	Notes
1	Kaishin (海神 The God of the Sea)	April 25, 1988	1st soundtrack from NHK documentary The Silk Road of the Sea
2	Masala Tea Waltz	October 10, 1988	2nd soundtrack from NHK documentary The Silk Road of the Sea
3	Kyara (伽羅)	April 25, 1989	3rd soundtrack from NHK documentary The Silk Road of the Sea
4	Sailing	August 5, 1989	Soundtrack album from NHK documentary The Silk Road of the Sea
5	Hijo Joshi (悲情城市 A City of Sadness)	April 25, 1990	Soundtrack from the movie A City of Sadness
6	Tsuki no Ishi to Chikyu no Mizu (月の石と、地球の水 The Stone of the Moon and The Water of the Earth)	October 1, 1990	
7	Shin Beagle-Go Tankenki (新ビーグル号探検記 New Beagle Explorational Journal)	October 1, 1991	Soundtrack from TV program New Beagle Explorational Journal
8	Tokyoite	July 25, 1992	
9	Space Oz no Boken (スペース・オズの冒険 The Space Adventures of Oz)	November 26, 1992	Soundtrack from TV animation The Space Adventures of Oz
10	Yah Yah Yah	March 10, 1993	Soundtrack from TV drama Furikaereba Yatsuga Iru (振り返れば奴がいる Turn Around and That Guy'll Be There) / Produced by Aska & S.E.N.S. / 8th Japan Gold Disc Award Album Award (1994)
11	Kumikyoku - Hito to Toki to Kaze no Naka e (組曲 - 人と時と風の中へ The Suite - Winds of Time)	April 1, 1993	
12	Asunaro Hakusho (あすなろ白書 Asunaro White Paper)	November 1, 1993	Soundtrack from TV drama Asunaro Hakusho
13	Statement	February 25, 1994	Best Album 1988–1993
14	Deatta Koro no Kimi de Ite (出逢った頃の君でいて Be As You Were When We Met)	May 25, 1994	Soundtrack from TV drama Deatta Koro no Kimi de Ite
15	Kagayaku Toki no Naka de (輝く季節の中で In the Shining Season)	May 25, 1995	Soundtrack from TV drama Kagayaku Toki no Naka de
16	Asian Blue	November 15, 1995	
17	Palace Memories	July 24, 1996	1st soundtrack from NHK TV documentary Forbidden City
18	Palace Sketch	November 21, 1996	2nd soundtrack from NHK TV documentary Forbidden City
19	Palace Seeds	February 21, 1997	3rd soundtrack from NHK TV documentary Forbidden City
20	Sweetheart Story	March 21, 1997	Best Album selected for weddings
21	Flying	June 4, 1997	Soundtrack from TV drama Mrs. Cinderella
22	Heaven's Song	June 21, 1997	Best album from TV drama soundtracks
23	L'oiseau Bleu	November 21, 1997	Soundtrack from TV drama Aoi Tori (青い鳥 Blue Bird)
24	Kumikyoku II - Yasashisa no Sentaku (組曲II - やさしさの選択 The Suite II - The Choice of Gentleness)	March 21, 1998	
25	Wish	August 21, 1998	Soundtrack from TV drama Kamisama, Mo Sukoshi Dake (神様、もう少しだけ God, Just a Little More)
26	Movement	May 21, 1999	Best Album 1994–1998
27	Fine	July 23, 1999	Soundtrack from TV drama P.S. Genki desu, Shunpei (P.S. 元気です、俊平 P.S. I'm Fine, Shunpei)
28	Future	February 23, 2000	Soundtrack from TV drama Nisen-nen no Koi (二千年の恋 Love 2000)
29	Tomei na Ongaku (透明な音楽 Transparent Music)	August 23, 2000	Best Album / 2001, 15th Japan Gold Disk Grand-Prix Award of the year (Instrumental)
30	Tomei na Ongaku 2 (透明な音楽2 Transparent Music 2)	December 6, 2000	
31	Heijitsu no Kyujitsu (平日の休日。 Weekday Holiday)	April 25, 2001	
32	Heart	July 24, 2002	
33	Tomei na Jikan (透明な時間 Transparent Time)	July 23, 2003	Collaborational album with Etsushi Toyokawa
34	The Key	September 3, 2003	
35	Ren-ai Shu (恋愛集 Collection of Love)	November 24, 2004	
36	Shissou (疾走)	December 21, 2005	Soundtrack from the movie Shissou
37	Hotel Asia	December 21, 2005	
38	Yasumi Jikan (休み時間 Resting Time)	November 22, 2006	
39	Sound. Earth. Nature. Spirit. Vol. Sound	November 21, 2007	20th anniversary best album
40	Sound. Earth. Nature. Spirit. Vol. Earth	May 21, 2008	20th anniversary best album
41	Sound. Earth. Nature. Spirit. Vol. Nature	November 24, 2008	20th anniversary best album
42	Sound. Earth. Nature. Spirit. Vol. Spirit	May 27, 2009	20th anniversary best album
43	Forgiving	May 27, 2009	Soundtrack from TV drama Aishiteru - Kaiyo (アイシテル - 海容)
44	Kumikyoku - Sora ga Kokoro ni Naru hi (組曲 - 空がこころになる日 Suite - Sky In My Heart)	November 23, 2011	Soundtrack from TV drama Kyogu (境遇)

=== Other project singles ===
Title	Release date	Note
Opura-Upulai-Lai	September 23, 1998	as S.E.N.S. of Y (S.E.N.S. & Hiroko Yakushimaru)
Moonlight Dream	January 26, 2000	as S.E.N.S. featuring Susie Kang
Moonlight	August 4, 2004	as Yukari Katsuki (S.E.N.S.)

=== Other project albums ===
Title	Release date	Note
SUPER BEST 2000～S.E.N.S. TV DRAMA BEST SELECTION	November 15, 1995	Best Album
Terra Firma	December 16, 1998	as S.E.N.S. of Y (S.E.N.S. & Hiroko Yakushimaru) / Soundtrack from TV documentary program Kokyu Daiensei (故宮大遠征 Great Journey of the treasures of Palace Museum)
THE SILK ROAD OF THE SEA	May 21, 1999	3CDs Box Set of soundtrack from TV documentary Umi No Silk Road
THE PALACE MUSEUM TREASURES	May 21, 1999	3CDs Box Set of soundtrack from TV documentary Kokyu - Shihou Ga Kataru Chuka Gosen-nen -
Indigo	October 6, 2004	as Yukari Katsuki (S.E.N.S.) / 1st soundtrack from TV animation Kurau Phantom Memory
Crimson	December 16, 2004	as Yukari Katsuki (S.E.N.S.) / 2nd soundtrack from TV animation Kurau Phantom Memory
xxxHolic Soundfile	August 22, 2007	as S.E.N.S. Project / Soundtrack from TV animation xxxHolic
Genji Monogatari Sen-nenki (源氏物語千年紀Genji) Soundtrack	February 25, 2009	as S.E.N.S. Project / Soundtrack from TV animation Genji Monogatari Sennenki
Kimi ni Todoke (君に届け) Soundtrack	January 27, 2010	as S.E.N.S. Project / Soundtrack from TV animation Kimi ni Todoke
Kimi ni Todoke 2nd Season (君に届け 2ND SEASON) Soundtrack	February 23, 2011	as S.E.N.S. Project / Soundtrack from TV animation Kimi ni Todoke 2nd Season
Tofu Kozo (豆富小僧) Soundtrack	April 27, 2011	as S.E.N.S. Project / Soundtrack from 3D animation movie Tofu Kozo
S.E.N.S. GOLDEN ☆BEST SINGLES COLLECTION	October 26, 2011	Best Album
SKY IN MY HEART	May 14, 2014	Korean Version of Kumikyoku - Sora ga Kokoro ni Naru hi
The Warring States	April 22, 2014	Original Soundtrack from the movie The Warring States
Ore Monogatari!! (俺物語!!) Soundtrack	July 22, 2015	as S.E.N.S. Project / Soundtrack from TV animation Ore Monogatari!!
Totto-Chan! (トットちゃん!) Soundtrack	December 6, 2017	as S.E.N.S. Project / Soundtrack from TV drama Totto-Chan!
Space Battleship Yamato 2202: Warriors of Love (宇宙戦艦ヤマト2202 愛の戦士たち) Theme Songs	March 2, 2019	as S.E.N.S. Project
Roof of the World	April 1, 2022	as S.E.N.S. Project / Soundtrack from TV documentary Roof of the World
Sparrow	April 1, 2022	as S.E.N.S. Project / Soundtrack from TV drama Sparrow
The Glory of Tang Dynasty	April 1, 2022	as S.E.N.S. Project / Soundtrack from TV drama The Glory of Tang Dynasty
The Advisors Alliance	April 1, 2022	as S.E.N.S. Project / Soundtrack from TV drama The Advisors Alliance
Proud Wanderer	November 9, 2023	as S.E.N.S. Project / Soundtrack from TV drama The Smiling, Proud Wanderer
Kimi ni Todoke 3rd Season (君に届け 3RD SEASON) Soundtrack	August 3, 2024	as S.E.N.S. Project / Soundtrack from TV animation Kimi ni Todoke 3rd Season

== Awards ==
- Venezia International Festival of Film Grand Prix (1989)
- The 8th Japan Gold Disc Grand-Prix Album Award (Instrumental) (1994)
- The 15th Japan Gold Disc Grand-Prix Award of the year (Instrumental) (2001)

== See also ==
- Kitaro, a Japanese new-age composer
- Himekami, a Japanese new-age music group
