= Junko Karube =

Japanese manga artist

- Area: Manga artist
- Notable works: Kimi no te ga Sasayaite iru
- Awards: 18th Kodansha Manga Award for shōjo manga - Kimi no te ga Sasayaite iru

Junko Karube (Japanese: 軽部潤子, Hepburn: Karube Junko) is a Japanese manga artist. She is best known for Kimi no te ga Sasayaite iru ("Your Hands Are Whispering"), about a romance between a deaf woman and a hearing man, for which she won the 1994 Kodansha Manga Award for shōjo manga.
