= Waki Yamato =

Japanese manga artist

- Born: 一ノ関 和紀 (later 木野 和紀); March 13, 1948 (age 78) Sapporo, Japan
- Area: Manga artist
- Notable works: Haikara-san ga Tōru; Asaki Yume Mishi
- Awards: 1st Kodansha Manga Award for shōjo manga – Haikara-san ga Tōru

Waki Yamato (Japanese: 大和 和紀, Hepburn: Yamato Waki; born March 13, 1948) is a Japanese manga artist. She debuted in 1966 with the short story Dorobō Tenshi.

Since her debut, Yamato steadily created and published a variety of works in the genre of shōjo manga. Among her early time works, Mon Cherie CoCo, 1971, was adapted into an anime television series, and her work, Haikara-san ga Tōru, 1975 to 1977, was very successful, winning the 1st Kodansha Manga Award for shōjo manga in 1977. It was also made into a musical for the Takarazuka Revue, an anime series (which reached an international audience through TV broadcasts in Italy and France), and a live-action film. Through these early works, she established her position as one of the most popular manga artists.

== Life and works ==
After the success of Haikara-san ga Tōru, she continued to create many manga, including the comedy Aramis '78 (series), Yokohama Monogatari (The Story of Yokohama), and N. Y. Komachi (The Belle of New York). The latter two were historical manga, set during the Meiji period.

The heroines of these stories were active girls who traveled overseas. Yamato's early work Reidii Mitsuko (Lady Mitsuko), 1976, was based on the true story of Mitsuko Aoyama, who was the mother of Richard von Coudenhove-Kalergi.

Similarly, in Yokohama Monogatari, Uno visits California, marries her Japanese lover there and returns to Yokohama, while Mariko visits London to meet her Japanese husband. In N. Y. Komachi tomboy Shino travels to New York and becomes a camerawoman. At the end she settles in America with her husband Danny.

=== Asaki Yume Mishi ===
Yamato's major work is Asaki Yume Mishi. Yamato spent 13 years (1980–93) completing this famous long work, based on Murasaki Shikibu's The Tale of Genji. Yamato studied the historical details of the Heian period. But she made radical changes to the characters and plot, to fit contemporary mores. Yet her work remains one of the best visualizations of the Heian era.

== List of works ==
Book information from Media Arts Database. (in progress, incomplete).

N	Title	ja-Title	Label	Vol.	Date of Pub.	Publisher	Magazine	Date	Remark
01	Thief Angel	泥棒天使	Teen comics deluxe	1	1972-10-10	Wakagi shobo	Shojo Friend	1966 (37th)	Debut short story
02	Mon Cheri CoCo	モンシェリCoCo	KC	3	1972-08-28	Kodansha	Shojo Friend	1968	adapted into TV anime (1972)
03	Haikara-san ga Tōru	はいからさんが通る	KC friend	8	1975–1977	Kodansha			adapted into TV anime (1978–79)
04	Lady Mitsuko	レディーミツコ	KC friend B	1	1977	Kodansha			
05	Killa	Killa	KC friend	5	1978–1979	Kodansha			
06	End of Heaven, Border of Earth	天の果て地の限り	KC mimi	1	1979-10-15	Kodansha			
07	Aramis '78	アラミス'78	KC friend B	4	1979–1984	Kodansha			
08	Playball in the Year 2600	紀元2600年のプレイボール	KC friend	5	1979–1980	Kodansha			
09	The One with Wings	翼ある者	KC friend	1	198008-15	Kodansha			
10	Asaki Yume Mishi	あさきゆめみし	KC mimi	13	1980–1993	Kodansha			based on Murasaki Shikibu's The Tale of Genji
11	Moonlight Shining Tree	月光樹	KC friend B	1	1980	Kodansha			
12	Myth of Dark-blue Color	あい色神話	KC friend	1	1980-12-15	Kodansha			
13	The Story of Yokohama	ヨコハマ物語	KC friend	8	1981–1984	Kodansha			
14	The Belle of New York	NY小町	KC friend	8	1986–1988	Kodansha			
15	High Hheels Cop	ハイヒールCOP	KC mimi deluxe	5	1990–1993	Kodansha			
16	Wow, He is Prince!?	なんと王子さま!?	KC friend	1	1990-09-13	Kodansha			
17	Fruits of the Angel	天使の果実	KC mimi	3	1993–1994	Kodansha			based on novel by Shizuka Ijuin
18	Natascha of Rainbow	虹のナターシャ	KC mimi	5	1995–1997	Kodansha			based on novel by Mariko Hayashi
19	Samurai facing to the West	にしむく士	KC BE LOVE	5	1997–2001	Kodansha			
20	Baby-sitter Gin!	ベビーシッター・ギン!	K Comics kiss	9	1998–2007	Kodansha			
21	The Scent of Crimson	紅匂ふ	KC BE LOVE	4	1998–2007	Kodansha			
22	The Daughter of Ishtar	イシュタルの娘	KC BE LOVE	16	2010–2017	Kodansha			(The Life of Ono no Otsū)

== Reception ==
Yamato's story manga Haikara-san ga Tōru series had been sold over 10 million copies. Also, the total sales number of her representative work Asaki YUmemishi had been over 12 million, as of 1997.

== Notes and references ==
- Waki Yamato manga at Media Arts Database (in Japanese)
- List of Works fan site, based on ｢大和和紀自選集5｣(Author's Selected Works, Vol.5) Kodansha, (Japanese)
- List of Works fan site, based on ｢大和和紀自選集5｣(Author's Selected Works, Vol.5) Kodansha, (Japanese)
- Yamato Waki Haikara-san ga Tooru Kodansha (Japanese comic)
- Yamato Waki Lady Mitsuko Kodansha (Japanese comic)
- Yamato Waki Yokohama Monogatari 8 volumes, Kodansha (Japanese comic)
- Yamato Waki N. Y. Komachi 8 volumes, Kodansha (Japanese comic)
- Yamato Waki Asaki Yume Mishi 13 volumes, Kodansha (Japanese comic)

=== Bibliography ===
- Nichigai Associates Editorial Department (April 21, 1997), Dictionary of Manga and Anime artists. Nichigai Associates Co., Ltd. ISBN 4-8169-1423-4
- Hiroyuki Hirosaki ed. (July 30, 2021), Bungei Special Feature: Yamato Waki, the 55th Anniversary of Debut. Kawade Shobo Shinsha Co. Ltd. ISBN 978-4-309-98032-4
- ｢あさきゆめみし PerfectBook｣宝島社 (Takarajima co.ltd.), 2003/2007 ISBN 978-4-7966-3603-2
