= Taifu Comics =

French publishing company

Taifu Comics is a French manga publisher established in 2004.

== Titles ==
- +Anima
- Akumetsu
- Bond(z)
- Challengers
- Cobra
- Crossroad
- Cut
- Densha Otoko
- Girl Friends
- Hanjuku-Joshi
- Haru Natsu Aki Fuyu
- Himitsu no Recipe
- Karasu Tengu Kabuto
- Koi wa Ina Mono Myōna Mono
- Little Butterfly
- Living For Tomorrow
- Love Junkies
- Shina Dark
- Taimashin
- The Tyrant Falls in Love
- Tokyo Underground
- Wild Rock

== See also ==
- List of manga publishers
