= Dear+ =

Japanese manga magazine

- December 2020 issue of Dear+, featuring Therapy Game
- Categories: Manga (boys' love)
- Frequency: Monthly (Dear+); Bimonthly (Chéri+); Quarterly (Shōsetsu Dear+)
- Publisher: Shinshokan
- First issue: 1997 (Dear+); 1998 (Shōsetsu Dear+); 2011 (Chéri+)
- Country: Japan
- Based in: Tokyo
- Website: www.shinshokan.com/dearplus/

Dear+ (Japanese: ディアプラス, Hepburn: Dia Purasu; pronounced Dear Plus) is a monthly manga magazine published by Shinshokan that specializes in boys' love (BL) manga. It has two sister publications: the quarterly BL light novel magazine Shōsetsu Dear+ (Japanese: 小説ディアプラス), and the bimonthly BL manga magazine Chéri+ (Japanese: シェリプラス, Hepburn: Sheri Purasu).

== History ==
Dear+ was founded in 1997 as a companion magazine to Shinshokan's manga magazine Wings, which focuses on shōjo manga (manga for girls). As a magazine focused on BL (male-male romance), Dear+ was established to publish material considered too explicit for publication in Wings. Initially established as a quarterly magazine, Dear+ has been published monthly since 2003.

Shōsetsu Dear+ was established in 1998 as a magazine publishing serialized BL light novels. Chéri+ was established in 2011 as a BL magazine published triannually (thrice per year) before becoming a quarterly publication in 2014.

To commemorate the 20th anniversary of Dear+ in 2017, an exhibition was held at the Parco Museum in Ikebukuro. The exhibition featured original artwork from 53 artists, as well as smartphone-enabled augmented reality elements. Bar Dear+, a radio program also commemorating the anniversary, was broadcast weekly on Super! A&G+ (an internet radio subsidiary of Nippon Cultural Broadcasting) from June 6 to August 29, 2017. The program was hosted by Toshiki Masuda and Yoshiki Nakajima.

== Serializations ==
The following is a partial list of titles serialized in Dear+, Shōsetsu Dear+, and Chéri+.

=== Dear+ ===
Current

- Hey, Class President! by Kaori Monchi (since 2003; on hiatus)
- Kuroneko Kareshi by Aya Sakyō (since 2012)
- Therapy Game: Restart by Meguru Hinohara (since 2019)

Concluded

- Dear Myself by Eiki Eiki (1998)
- Electric Hands by Taishi Zaō (1998)
- Color by Eiki Eiki and Taishi Zaō (1999)
- World's End by Eiki Eiki (1999)
- Jazz by Sakae Maeda and Tamotsu Takamure (1999–2000)
- Camera, Camera, Camera by Kazura Matsumoto (2002–2003)
- Koi wa Ina Mono Myōna Mono by Taishi Zaō (2002)
- Beyond My Touch by Tomo Maeda (2003)
- Brilliant Blue by Saemi Yorita (2004–2005)
- Ze by Yuki Shimizu (2004–2011)
- Living for Tomorrow by Taishi Zaō (2005)
- Boys Love by Kaim Tachibana (2007)
- Ten Count by Rihito Takarai (2013–2017)
- Secret XXX by Meguru Hinohara (2016–2017)
- Therapy Game by Meguru Hinohara (2017–2018)
- Takara's Treasure by Minta Suzumaru (2020–2022)

=== Shōsetsu Dear+ ===
- Yes, No, or Maybe? by Michi Ichiho and Lala Takemiya (since 2014)

=== Chéri+ ===
- Given by Natsuki Kizu (2013-2023)
- Given 10th Mix by Natsuki Kizu (since 2024)
- Candy Color Paradox by Isaku Natsume (2010–2012 in Dear+; moved to Chéri+ in 2014)
