= The Devil's Secret =

Japanese manga

- Cover of the English language edition.

アクマのひみつ (Akuma no Himitsu)
- Genre: Yaoi
- Manga
- Written by: Hinako Takanaga
- Published by: Libre Publishing
- English publisher: NA: 801 Media
- Magazine: Be × Boy Gold
- Published: May 10, 2007

The Devil's Secret (アクマのひみつ, Akuma no Himitsu) is a Boys Love manga by the Japanese manga artist Hinako Takanaga, who also authored Little Butterfly, Challengers and The Tyrant Falls in Love. It is licensed in English by 801 Media and in German by Tokyopop Germany.

== Plot ==
Father Mauro, a priest who looks after a small parish, takes in a young man named Raoul and discovers that he is an incubus. Father Mauro finds it hard to ignore his growing feelings for the demon, especially when Raoul sickens because he does not have sex, which is food to his kind. They discover this after Raoul seduces Mauro, and his horns and tail grow larger. Later, Raoul's older brother Baldur comes to collect him and bring him back to the demon realm. Baldur disapproves of Raoul and Father Mauro's relationship, as he believes Raoul should use his powers to make Father Mauro his sex slave (particularly in light of the fact that Mauro, uncomfortable with a sexual relationship given his vows has been denying Raoul sex). Father Mauro has doubts about his own feelings' validity after learning that incubi have the power to do this and rejects Raoul, who becomes depressed and turns into a ball. Baldur plans to take him away, but Father Mauro stops him. Raoul turns back, the couple make up and Baldur returns to the demons' realm, as taking Raoul would simply cause him to revert to a ball again. Baldur explains the situation to his father, and an old lover of Baldur's, Zahan, tries to make Baldur remember what he's missing. Some time has passed and ends in an epilogue showing that as he and Mauro are now in a true relationship, Raoul has gained full horns, and large tail and wings and the power to conceal these when he is not "eating".

Let's Do Something Useless!

A student teacher is propositioned by one of his students.

Before Winter Comes…

A new college student Tomono thinks about a text message his best friend from high school Yuba sent him, who had confessed his love to him.

== Reception ==
Leroy Douresseaux regarded the premise as "scandalous", and describes the message of the book as being one of all-conquering love. Holly Ellingwood praised Takanaga's sense of humour in this book.
