= Love Stage!! =

Japanese manga and anime series

- Cover of Love Stage!! volume 1.

ラブ ステージ (Rabu Sutēji)
- Genre: Romantic comedy, Yaoi
- Manga
- Written by: Eiki Eiki
- Illustrated by: Taishi Zaō
- Published by: Kadokawa Shoten
- English publisher: NA: SuBLime
- Magazine: Asuka Ciel
- Original run: July 2010 – September 2016
- Volumes: 7
- Light novel

Back Stage!!
- Written by: Eiki Eiki; Kazuki Amano
- Illustrated by: Taishi Zaō
- Published by: Kadokawa Shoten
- Imprint: Kadokawa Ruby Bunko
- Original run: May 31, 2011 – June 1, 2013
- Volumes: 3
- Anime television series
- Directed by: Ken'ichi Kasai
- Written by: Michiko Yokote
- Music by: Ryosuke Nakanishi
- Studio: J.C.Staff
- Licensed by: NA: Sentai Filmworks
- Original network: Tokyo MX, Sun TV, BS11, MTV, TV Saitama, CTC, tvk, GBS, TVQ, Anime Network
- Original run: July 9, 2014 – September 10, 2014
- Episodes: 10 + 1 OVA
- Live-action film
- Written by: Eiki Eiki
- Released: October 2, 2020

Love Stage!! (Japanese: ラブ ステージ, Hepburn: Rabu Sutēji) is a Japanese yaoi manga series written by Eiki Eiki and illustrated by Taishi Zaō. It began serialization in the July 2010 issue of Kadokawa Shoten's Asuka Ciel magazine. The manga is licensed in North America by SuBLime. A spin-off light novel series titled Back Stage!! began publication in May 2011. A 10-episode anime television series adaptation produced by J.C.Staff aired between July and September 2014.

== Characters ==
Izumi Sena (瀬名 泉水, Sena Izumi)
Voiced by: Tsubasa Yonaga (Japanese); Greg Ayres, Tia Ballard (child) (English)
Portrayed by: Mahiro Sugiyama (film)
Izumi is the main protagonist of the story. A college student at the age of eighteen, he aspires to be a manga author despite lacking the talent for it. His father is a director, his mother is a film actress, and his older brother Shōgo is the lead vocalist of a popular band. Ten years ago, he botched a bouquet catching scene in a commercial while dressed as a girl, and since then he refuses to be involved in the entertainment industry due to his "accident" caused by stage fright. Over the course of the series, he begins to develop strong feelings for Ryoma and falls in love with him. He is a huge fan of the fictional anime show Magical Girl Lala-Lulu. Izumi is often mistaken as a girl due to his tiny frame.
Ryōma Ichijō (一条 龍馬, Ichijō Ryōma)
Voiced by: Takuya Eguchi (Japanese); Adam Gibbs (English)
Portrayed by: Hiroki Nakada (film)
Ryoma is a popular young actor two years older than Izumi, who fell in love with him as a child, thinking him to be a girl, when they co-starred in a commercial together ten years prior. Even after he finds out Izumi is a guy when they reunite, he still maintains strong feelings for him. He fell in love with Izumi when he was ten and Izumi was eight during the commercial.
Rei Sagara (相楽 玲, Sagara Rei)
Voiced by: Daisuke Hirakawa (Japanese); David Wald (English)
Portrayed by: Shinichi Wago (film)
Rei is the Sena family's manager. He was taken in by Izumi's father, Seiya Sena, when he was 18 years old and has lived with the family since then.
Shōgo Sena (瀬名 聖湖, Sena Shōgo)
Voiced by: Daigo (Japanese); Greg Cote (English)
Shōgo is Izumi's doting older brother. Whenever Rei has problems regarding Izumi, Rei contacts his brother. He always dotes on his younger brother and gives Izumi Magical Girl Lala-Lulu merchandise whenever the situation calls for it. Shōgo has been in love with Rei since he was 16 and is the main reason why he joined the band Crusherz.

== Media ==
=== Manga ===
Love Stage!! is written by Eiki Eiki and illustrated by Taishi Zaō. It began serialization in the July 2010 issue of Kadokawa Shoten's Asuka Ciel magazine. Seven tankōbon volumes was published from May 27, 2011, to November 1, 2016. The manga is licensed in North America by SuBLime. The manga is also published in Germany by Tokyopop.

No.	Original release date	Original ISBN	English release date	English ISBN
1	May 27, 2011	978-4-04-854636-2	May 12, 2015	978-1-42-157991-7
2	May 30, 2012	978-4-04-120265-4	July 14, 2015	978-1-42-157992-4
3	May 30, 2013	978-4-04-120723-9	September 8, 2015	978-1-42-157993-1
4	May 31, 2014	978-4-04-121134-2	November 10, 2015	978-1-42-157994-8
5	November 22, 2014	978-4-04-101729-6; ISBN 978-4-04-101730-2 (limited edition)	May 10, 2016	978-1-42-158049-4
6	October 1, 2015	978-4-04-103322-7; ISBN 978-4-04-103323-4 (limited edition)	December 13, 2016	978-1-42-158808-7
7	November 1, 2016	978-4-04-104889-4	September 12, 2017	978-1-42159372-2

The Back Stage!! spin-off manga series, adapted from the previously released light novels, got published by Kadokawa Shoten.

No.	Japanese release date	Japanese ISBN
1	July 1, 2021	978-4041114896
2	August 1, 2022	978-4041127698
3	September 29, 2023	978-4041141526

=== Light novels ===
The first volume of a spin-off light novel series titled Back Stage!!, written by Eiki Eiki and Kazuki Amano, with illustrations by Taishi Zaō, was published by Kadokawa Shoten under their Kadokawa Ruby Bunko imprint on May 31, 2011. As of June 1, 2013, three volumes have been released.

No.	Japanese release date	Japanese ISBN
1	May 31, 2011	978-4-04-449423-0
2	December 28, 2011	978-4-04-100150-9
3	June 1, 2013	978-4-04-100866-9

=== Anime ===
A 10-episode anime adaptation was first announced by Kadokawa in November 2013 at Animate Girls Festival. Directed by Ken'ichi Kasai and produced by J.C.Staff, it aired between July 9 and September 10, 2014, on Tokyo MX. The screenplay is written by Michiko Yokote and the character design is by Yōko Itō. Crunchyroll licensed the series to be streamed in countries of North America, Europe, Latin America and Africa. It was released in five DVD and Blu-ray volumes by Kadokawa Shoten from September 26, 2014, to January 24, 2015. The opening theme is "LΦvest" by Screen Mode under the record label Lantis and the ending theme is "Click Your Heart!!" by Kazutomi Yamamoto.

==== Episode list ====
No.	Title	Original air date
1	"The Door to My Dreams"; Transliteration: "Yume no Tobira" (Japanese: ユメヘノトビラ)	July 9, 2014
Izumi Sena is a college student who aspires to be a manga artist despite lacking talent for it. His family is in show business. He is a huge fan of the fictional anime series Magical Girl Lala-Lulu. He is lured by his older brother Shōgo with a voice-customized Lala-Lulu alarm clock to shoot a commercial as a "ten years later version" of a wedding commercial shot when he was a kid. Shōgo tells him he is supposed to act as the bride that caught the bouquet 10 years earlier with a boy. That boy was Ryoma Ichijo, a popular young actor. Wanting to keep it a secret, Izumi asks his manager and makeup artists not to tell anyone about his real identity. When Izumi messes up the shoot, Ryoma gives him a marble and tells Izumi to use it again. At first, Izumi wonders what he meant by "again", but he then remembers that when he messed up the shoot ten years ago, Ryoma gave him a marble and told him to hold it near his chest and ask for nervousness to go away. Izumi holds the marble near his chest and before long, all his nervousness disappears.
2	"Because I Was Able to Meet You"; Transliteration: "Kimi ni Aetakara" (Japanese: キミニアエタカラ)	July 16, 2014
Izumi accepts to do the happy bride commercial and has to work with Ryoma. Izumi gets dressed up as a girl, and when Ryoma finds out, he gets mad.
3	"If Only It Had All Been A Dream"; Transliteration: "Yume Nara Yokatta no Ni" (Japanese: ユメナラヨカッタノニ)	July 23, 2014
Izumi discovers the good-luck marble is cracked, and unsuccessfully tries to find a replacement. Ryoma's work being disrupted by thoughts of Izumi, he visits Izumi's house in order to put his feelings to rest by reminding himself that Izumi is male. However, after partially undressing the unwilling Izumi, he ends up kissing his body and violating him until Izumi's annoying older brother interrupts Ryoma.
4	"But I Do Like You"; Transliteration: "Demo Suki Nanda" (Japanese: デモスキナンダ)	July 30, 2014
Izumi shuts himself in his room for a few days. Rei coaxes him out by reminding him of the consequences to his family. He also reveals that he too has had sexual encounters with men. After being on a comedy show with gloomy Ryoma, Shōgo agrees to let Ryoma see Izumi on the condition that he is there too. However, he gets mobbed by fans and Ryoma chases after Izumi alone and apologises on hands and knees. Rei tracks Izumi, and he and Shōgo watch the two from a car. Ryoma explains his actions and Izumi agrees to be "texting buddies". A suspicious white van (later shown to be paparazzi) pulls away from the scene.
5	"Just a Little"; Transliteration: "Chotto Dake Nara" (Japanese: チョットダケナラ)	August 6, 2014
Ryoma has been texting Izumi excessively, and visits Izumi at his school. Izumi relents and lets him stay for Manga Club. Izumi's irritation dissipates when Ryoma compliments his manga. Izumi wants to enter the Kadoyama Manga Prize and acquires Ryoma's help to meet the deadline. After finishing, Izumi collapses into sleep and Ryoma puts him to bed. Before leaving for work, Ryoma cannot resist stealing several kisses from the sleeping Izumi.
6	"What Kind of Test Is That?"; Transliteration: "Nan no Shiren desu ka" (Japanese: ナンノシレンデスカ)	August 13, 2014
Ryoma has been called to an emergency meeting with the company president, who reveals photos of Ryoma and Izumi taken by paparazzi. Uncertain whether to reveal Izumi is male, Ryoma calls Rei who devises a plan to divert attention away from a possible scandal by having Izumi make his debut. Izumi rebels, as he already has his heart set on debuting as a manga artist. Rei makes a deal with him, that if Izumi's manga doesn't get a favorable review, then Izumi must make his debut in the film industry. Izumi agrees and confidently takes his manga to the agency. However the reviewer tells him he has no talent and depressed Izumi goes to Ryoma's house, asking him not to contact Rei. Izumi never wants to return home and tells Ryoma that he wants to stay at Ryoma's place. Ryoma reminds him that he's in love with Izumi and that he doesn't have that much self-control. Defeated Izumi invites him to have his way with him.
7	"Could This Be..."; Transliteration: "Korette Moshikashite" (Japanese: コレッテモシカシテ)	August 20, 2014
Ryoma begins to take Izumi's invitation but stops when he notices Izumi crying. Upset at Izumi's disregard for his legitimate feelings for him, he leaves the room. But realizing the reason why Izumi is acting this way, he takes Izumi's manga to be reviewed by the author of the Lala-Lulu manga himself, Saotomi. Invigorated by Ryoma's and Saotomi's words, Izumi decides to go home, still with some fear of what Rei will say. Rei who has not slept since Izumi left, greets him joyfully before falling immediately to sleep. Ryoma kisses Izumi before going home.
8	"Love-Stage: Men's Style"; Transliteration: "Rabu-Stēji Otokotachi no Ryūgi" (Japanese: Φ(ラブ)-STAGE 男達の流儀)	August 27, 2014
Izumi has agreed to make a debut, which details his debut and the trivial matters behind it. He is having jitters about his press conference and is pressured by Rei about his agreement in debuting. Rei shows him different footage about what the family thinks of Izumi to help him be more confident, but in the end, Ryoma's message calms him down. He gets scared again after hair and make up and a kiss from Ryoma calms him down. At the press conference it is finally revealed that Izumi is actually a guy, with Shōgo making the official announcement of Izumi debuting and stating that Izumi is his brother.
9	"Which Way Is Right?"; Transliteration: "Docchi ga Tadashii no" (Japanese: ドッチガタダシイノ)	September 3, 2014
Izumi has been in his room since the press conference. Rei catches Izumi buying Ryoma-paraphernalia online and realizes the cause. Izumi is unsure about his feelings. Ryoma on the other hand is worried about the extra competition with admirers now that Izumi has debuted. When he meets Izumi on the set of his show, he gets jealous of the attention Izumi gives his fans (Ryoma's co-workers) and pulls Izumi away. He then asks Izumi whether Izumi has feelings for him or if they are just texting buddies before collapsing due to exhaustion. Ryoma is admitted to the hospital and later released to rest at home. Izumi is caught again by Rei but this time has been buying yaoi manga. Izumi asks Rei about the details of sex with another man. Izumi leaves the house to meet up with his manga club, but is recognized when his glasses fall off. A mob of fans chase after him and Izumi hides out in a construction area. Meanwhile, Kuroi, from Izumi's manga club, saw him pass and runs after him. Izumi encounters some thugs harassing a man for money. The man escapes and the thug's attention turns to Izumi.
10	"Love is Not Enough"; Transliteration: "Suki ja Tarinai" (Japanese: スキジャタリナイ)	September 10, 2014
Izumi manages to escape the attackers and runs into Kuroi who tells Izumi that he has been working as an assistant to the author of the Lala-Lulu manga, Saotomi. Kuroi relates how Ryoma came to the studio and grovelled before the editors and Saotomi, in order to get the review of Izumi's manga. Izumi realizes that he has feelings for Ryoma and goes to his flat, declaring that he's decided he wants Ryoma. They have sex for the first time and, afterwards, Izumi tells Ryoma he loves him.
OVA	"It Wasn't Just "a Little""; Transliteration: "Chotto ja Nakutte" (チョットジャナクッテ)	November 22, 2014
Ryoma is just finishing up a two-week shoot for the detective show he is starring in. As it was for a two-hour special, Seiya Sena, Izumi's father was asked to play as the supervisor of Ryoma's character. Izumi received a text from Ryoma saying that he was on his way home, however, Izumi does not want to see him for unknown reasons. As Ryoma drives up to Izumi's place the next day, he fantasizes what he would do with Izumi on their date. To his disappointment, Izumi shows up at the door with his chaperons, Rei and Shōgo (although he did not know it, Izumi asked Rei for favor: to call Shōgo knowing that he would intervene on the date). Shōgo immediately derails Ryoma's plans for a romantic date and with Shōgo's adamant insistence, is forced to drive to the amusement park. With Shōgo preventing Ryoma from being alone with Izumi, he decides to take matters into his own hands and "loses" Shōgo in the Maze game. Seeing his chance, Ryoma whisks Izumi away (Rei was out getting popcorn and drinks) when Izumi tells him that he is afraid of being alone with him. He says he is scared of getting hurt during sex and Ryoma becomes shell shocked. The next day, Izumi asks advice from Rei for his "friend" K-kun. He tells Rei that "K-kun" does not like sex and is scared of it. Rei tells Izumi that he should tell this "If you dont want to take it, you simply need to shove it in him". With this advice, Izumi goes to tell "K-kun" he went to Ryoma's apt. There he learns that Ryoma spent all day learning how to pleasure the male body without causing pain. Ryoma and Izumi make love, which Izumi actually enjoys. He mentions to Ryoma how he had actually wanted to top him before, much to his horror. The OVA ends with Shōgo and Rei riding the Ferris wheel, and it is hinted that Shōgo and Rei kiss.

=== Film ===
The September 2019 issue of Ciel announced that a live-action film adaptation for Love Stage!! had been green-lit, with Eiki Eiki, the manga's original author, in charge of the screenplay. To promote the announcement, a short story was printed in the issue along with a re-print of the manga's first chapter. On October 2, 2019, the film's cast and 2020 release date was announced.

=== TV drama ===
A Thai live-action television drama adaptation was announced on February 28, 2021. It starred Kittipat Kaewcharoen and Turbo Chanokchon Boonmanawong and premiered through AIS Play and Amarin TV on September 12, 2022.
