= The Day of Revolution =

Japanese manga series

- Cover of the first volume, featuring Kei (left) and Megumi (right)

革命の日 (Kakumei no Hi)
- Genre: Romantic comedy
- Manga
- Written by: Mikiyo Tsuda
- Published by: Shinshokan
- English publisher: NA: Digital Manga Publishing
- Magazine: South
- Original run: 1999 – 2001
- Volumes: 2

The Day of Revolution (Japanese: 革命の日, Hepburn: Kakumei no Hi) is a Japanese manga series written and illustrated by Mikiyo Tsuda. It was serialized in Shinshokan's shōjo manga magazine South from 1999 to 2001; two volumes were published. Two drama CDs based on the series were produced, the first in July 2001 and the second in March 2002. The story mainly focuses around an intersex boy who starts to live as a girl upon revelation of being intersex and how her group of friends changes due to her new lifestyle.

The series was initially intended to be completed in a single volume. After Tsuda went to a convention and saw fans thought it ended on a cliffhanger, she was convinced by a friend that it needed a more conclusive resolution, so she wrote a second volume to give it a proper ending. A major theme is the difference of social standing between Megumi as a boy and as a girl. Critics have praised the story, particularly the humor, and the artwork, though some felt the backgrounds lacked detail. After the end of the series, it was spun-off into the manga Princess Princess, with Megumi's boyfriend, Mikoto, as one of the three protagonists.

== Plot ==
The Day of Revolution revolves around Kei Yoshikawa, a boy in high school who one day is informed that he is genetically female. This shocking realization causes his family to grow closer together and Kei decides that he is going to restart his life as a girl named Megumi. Megumi takes a six-month leave from school and returns as a first-year student with Makoto Yutaka, the niece of the doctor who aided in Kei's transition; Makoto also helps Megumi adjust to living life as a girl. Megumi is quickly found out by her old male friends who all start hitting on her once they discover the truth that she was Kei. Shocked at their new behavior, Megumi is appalled at the thought of ever dating any one of them or even getting a boyfriend. After a traumatic experience with a former enemy, she tells her friends that she has chosen Makoto instead of any of them, though they do not back down in their pursuits.

Megumi, in an attempt to avoid her persistent male friends, starts spending more time at Makoto's house where she meets her younger brother Mikoto, who is home during the summer from an all-boys boarding school. Megumi starts to become more fond of Mikoto, though still only thinks of him as a younger brother, while at the same time Mikoto harbors feelings for Megumi. Megumi and Mikoto go on a date together but are interrupted by Megumi's male friends and Makoto. Megumi attempts to protect Mikoto from her friends' teasing of him, and in the process causes Mikoto to confess his love to her. Megumi and Mikoto begin dating though are still constantly interrupted and are thus unable to progress their relationship very far even two years later. However, they resolve to make progress together.

== Characters ==
Kei/Megumi Yoshikawa (吉川 恵, Yoshikawa Kei/Megumi)
Voiced by: Junko Takeuchi
Kei was a rebellious boy in high school who would get into fights along with his three close friends. However, one day his doctor tells him and his parents that while Kei may appear to be physically male, he is in fact genetically female female. He thus starts to live as a girl and even changes his name to Megumi, which uses the same kanji as 'Kei'. After the change in lifestyle, Megumi still has a problem with the transition from male to female. Even as Megumi dresses as a girl, she still feels more like a boy, and feels more comfortable when around Makoto. As a guy, he was often told he was cute, causing him to physically retaliate and retains much of the same personality after his transition. Megumi tends to be very outspoken and even blunt sometimes.
Makoto Yutaka (豊 麻琴, Yutaka Makoto)
Voiced by: Fujiko Takimoto
Makoto is Megumi's best female friend who acts as a kind of coach to guide her through the process of becoming a typical girl. She teaches Megumi things such as feminine mannerisms, and speech patterns that only Japanese girls use. She was given this task because she is the niece to Kei's doctor and because she wants to become a counselor after high school. Makoto is very protective of Megumi, not wanting anything bad to happen to her. She has a very strong personality and uses it to command people around her however she likes. Makoto often uses this trait to coerce her younger brother, Mikoto, into doing things she wants him to do, whether they be for her own benefit or his own.
Mikoto Yutaka (豊 実琴, Yutaka Mikoto)
Voiced by: Naoki Yanagi
Mikoto is Makoto's younger brother who later becomes Megumi's boyfriend. He is a rather short guy who is in his second year at an all-boys junior high school. He is usually a very shy person but speaks out with much emotion. Ever since he entered junior high, he has been plagued by other students who treat him more like a girl than a guy due to his appearance and feminine face and is intensely embarrassed about this happening to him. He takes an early liking to Megumi by the pictures of her that are displayed at his house. Mikoto even takes a few of the pictures for himself, something his sister reminds him about later to the embarrassment of Mikoto. Eventually, he wants to become a doctor and take over the family hospital.
Hiroaki Kawada (河和田 広明, Kawada Hiroaki)
Voiced by: Eiji Takemoto
Hiroaki Kawada is a former classmate of Kei's who eventually becomes the student council president. He has a lot of traits that fit well for a school president, such as forcefulness and being straightforward.
Shuji Toba (鳥羽 修司, Tōba Shūji)
Voiced by: Chihiro Suzuki
Shuji Toba has a very lively personality and is one of Megumi's main friends. Back when Megumi was Kei, he would love to hug her, much to the detest of Kei.
Tadashi Tachimachi (立待 匡, Tachimachi Tadachi)
Voiced by: Koichi Hasebe
Tadashi Tachimachi is also one of Megumi's close friends; he is usually very silent. He is also rather short, only a few centimeters taller than Megumi.
Kazutoshi Shinmei (神明 和季, Kazutoshi Shinmei)
Voiced by: Susumu Chiba
Kazutoshi Shinmei is one of Megumi's friends that she knew as Kei. He constantly smiles and is shown to be the leader of Toba and Tachimachi. He can be very domineering and intimidating at times.
Taisei Nakagawa (中河 大誠, Nakagawa Taisei)
Taisei Nakagawa is a third-year student at the school who is at odds with Shinmei, Toba, Tachimachi and Kei since they took over the roof position at the top of the school. He is rather idiotic and does not always think up the best of plans on how to go about things. Also, he is the main reason Megumi starts to avoid guys after he assaults her one day.
Takayuki Katakaki (片上 孝之, Katakaki Takayuki) & Tomoyuki Katakaki (片上 智之, Katakaki Tomoyuki)
They are twin brothers who serve as the voice of reason for the otherwise idiotic Nakagawa. They always hang around with him and follow him as their leader.

== Production ==
Tsuda initially intended the story to be complete after the first volume, but was persuaded by her friend and fellow manga artist Eiki Eiki that the story had not been satisfactorily ended, and needed a more conclusive resolution. The kanji Zoku (続; lit. 'to continue') was added to the beginning of the title for the second volume of the Japanese release.

== Themes ==
The Day of Revolution emphasizes the difference in social standing between Megumi as a boy and a girl. In particular, upon entering school as a girl, Megumi is hit on by her friends from when she was a boy. The boys at the school also harass, bully, and grope her, which emphasizes her loss in social standing due to her transition. J. D. Ho of The Horn Book Magazine compared the plot to As You Like It, noting that Megumi creates new relationships that she could not have had as a boy. The series is not considered to be a yuri, though it does have yuri undertones.

== Media ==
=== Manga ===
Written and illustrated by Mikiyo Tsuda, the series was serialized in Shinshokan's shōjo manga magazine South from 1999 to 2001. Its individual chapters were collected into two tankōbon volumes.

Digital Manga Publishing published the series in English.

==== Volumes ====
No.	Original release date	Original ISBN	North American release date	North American ISBN
1	April 1, 1999	978-4-4036-1536-8	September 20, 2006	978-1-56970-890-3
"The Day of Revolution" (革命の日, Kakumei no Hi); "The Day of Rebirth" (再生の日, Saisei no Hi); "The Day of Battle" (決戦の日, Kessen no Hi)
2	June 1, 2001	978-4-4036-1633-4	December 13, 2006	978-1-56970-889-7
"The Day of Revolution Continued" (続・革命の日, Zoku Kakumei no Hi); "The Day of Fate" (運命の日, Unmei no Hi); "365-Step March" (365歩のマーチ, 365-ho no Māchi)

=== Drama CDs ===
Two drama CDs based on the manga were released by Shinshokan in Japan. The first was released on July 28, 2001, and the second was released on March 15, 2002.

== Reception ==
Irene Salzmann of Splash Comics liked the humor and characters, recommending the series to fans of Gravitation and Descendants of Darkness. Nicolas Demay of Planete BD described the humor as "genuinely hilarious". Demay also praised the artwork, especially the page layout, though he felt that the backgrounds needed more detail. A columnist for Manga News liked the humorous moments where Megumi tries to act like a girl. They felt the art style was similar to other shōjo manga, but that it suited the story well. However, they felt the backgrounds were a bit too empty. In Manga: The Complete Guide, Jason Thompson praised the initial premise, but felt the story became too generic. He described it as Cheeky Angel, but with a weaker heroine, slow plot, and dull page compositions.
