= My Maid, Miss Kishi =

Japanese manga series

- First tankōbon volume cover

メイドの岸さん (Meido no Kishi-san)
- Genre: Romantic comedy
- Manga
- Written by: Kano Kashiwagi
- Published by: Kodansha
- English publisher: NA: Kodansha USA
- Imprint: Shōnen Magazine Comics
- Magazine: Magazine Pocket
- Original run: May 5, 2020 – October 5, 2021
- Volumes: 6

My Maid, Miss Kishi (メイドの岸さん, Meido no Kishi-san) is a Japanese manga series written and illustrated by Kano Kashiwagi. It was serialized on Kodansha's Magazine Pocket manga website from May 2020 to October 2021.

== Synopsis ==
Kiichiro Hayase is the heir to the Hayase family, one of the most prestigious families in Japan and an elite who oversees operations for conglomerates in the country. However, Kiichiro is error-prone and has his maid Kishi-san cover for his mistakes. Kiichiro is grateful to her and tries to woo her, but is usually unsuccessful due to Kishi's unchanging cool appearance.

== Publication ==
Written and illustrated by Kano Kashiwagi, My Maid, Kishi-san was serialized on Kodansha's Magazine Pocket manga website from May 5, 2020, to October 5, 2021. Its chapters were collected into six tankōbon volumes released from October 9, 2020, to January 7, 2022.

During their panel at Anime Expo 2022, Kodansha USA announced that they had licensed the series for digital-only English publication.

No.	Original release date	Original ISBN	North American release date	North American ISBN
1	October 9, 2020	978-4-06-521011-6	July 12, 2022	978-1-68-491342-8
1. "Miss Kishi Doesn't Laugh"; 2. "The Gift Strategy!"; 3. "I Want to Praise Miss Kishi"; 4. "Cold"; 5. "Yuipomu"; 6. "Styling"; 7. "You're Fired"; 8. "Surveying"; 9. "Secretary"; 10. "The Box"; 11. "Sexual Harassment Suspicions"
2	January 8, 2021	978-4-06-522202-7	August 9, 2022	978-1-68-491391-6
12. "Count Samoyed"; 13. "Professional"; 14. "Bath Time"; 15. "Summer Festival"; 16. "Fireworks"; 17. "Summer Vacation"; 18. "I Want to Take Care of You"; 19. "Complaining"; 20. "Miko"; 21. "14 Years Ago"; 22. "Soichiro Hayase"; 23. "Farewell"
3	April 8, 2021	978-4-06-522874-6	September 13, 2022	978-1-68-491433-3
24. "Phone Call"; 25. "Welcome Back"; 26. "Handsome Actors"; 27. "Boing Boing"; 28. "Miss Kishi's Change"; 29. "Break Time"; 30. "Dishwashing"; 31. "Alcohol"; 32. "Hunger"; 33. "Marriage Partner"; 34. "Cape Jasmine Flowers"; 35. "The Kishi Family's Daughter"; 36. "Friends?"; 37. "Not Interested"; Bonus: "I Want to Make Miss Kishi Happy"
4	July 8, 2021	978-4-06-524004-5	October 11, 2022	978-1-68-491479-1
38. "Date Plan"; 39. "Auditions"; 40. "Valentine's"; 41. "In a Foreign Country"; 42. "Bug Snatcher"; 43. "Reciprocal Gift"; 44. "White Day"; 45. "School Years"; 46. "Scouting"; 47. "The Nanjo Group"; Bonus: "Slap"; Bonus: "Sudden Evening Shower"
5	October 8, 2021	978-4-06-525127-0	November 8, 2022	978-1-68-491536-1
48. "Solitary Morning"; 49. "Choice"; 50. "Reconciliation"; 51. "Impossible"; 52. "Hand"; 53. "Pajama Party"; 54. "Irritated"; 55. "Midnight Snack"; 56. "Takoyaki"; 57. "Swimsuit"; 58. "Womanizer"; 59. "Flag"
6	January 7, 2022	978-4-06-526588-8	December 13, 2022	978-1-68-491585-9
60. "Hope"; 61. "The Kishi Household"; 62. "The Plan"; 63. "Aquarium Date"; 64. "Contract"; 65. "Good Night"; 65.5. "Preparation"; 66. "Goodbye"; 67. "Weird Face"; 68. "Her Happiness"; 69. "A Forgotten Item"; 70. "My Maid, Miss Kishi"

== Reception ==
The series was nominated for the seventh Next Manga Awards in the web category.
