= I Don't Understand What My Sister's Friend Is Thinking =

Japanese manga series

- First tankōbon volume cover

妹の友達が何考えてるのかわからない (Imōto no Tomodachi ga Nani Kangaeteru no ka Wakaranai)
- Genre: Romantic comedy
- Manga
- Written by: Rei
- Published by: Comic Smart (digital); Ichijinsha (print)
- English publisher: NA: Mangamo
- Magazine: Ganma!
- Original run: April 29, 2020 – April 16, 2022
- Volumes: 3

I Don't Understand What My Sister's Friend Is Thinking (妹の友達が何考えてるのかわからない, Imōto no Tomodachi ga Nani Kangaeteru no ka Wakaranai) is a Japanese manga series written and illustrated by Rei. It was serialized on Comic Smart's Ganma! website from April 2020 to April 2022, with its chapters collected by Ichijinsha into three volumes released from February 2021 to July 2022.

== Synopsis ==
The series is centered around Yuto Hidaka and Tsuyu Amamiya, the best friend of Yuto's younger sister Chie. Due to Tsuyu's quiet and timid personality, Yuto cannot predict what she's thinking. Unbeknownst to him, Tsuyu holds romantic feelings towards him.

== Publication ==
Written and illustrated by Rei, I Don't Understand What My Sister's Friend Is Thinking was serialized on Comic Smart's Ganma! manga website from April 29, 2020, to April 16, 2022. Its chapters were collected by Ichijinsha into three tankōbon volumes released from February 26, 2021, to July 5, 2022.

During their panel at Anime Expo 2022, Mangamo announced that they licensed the series and added it to their app.

No.	Release date	ISBN
1	February 26, 2021	978-4-7580-2179-1
2	December 17, 2021	978-4-7580-2331-3
3	July 5, 2022	978-4-7580-2426-6

== Reception ==
The series was nominated for the sixth Next Manga Awards in 2020 in the web category and was ranked 10th.
