= Therapy Game =

Japanese manga series

- Cover of the Japanese version of vol. 1 of Therapy Game, first published on December 1, 2018

セラピーゲーム (Serapī Gēmu)
- Genre: Boys' love
- Manga

Secret XXX
- Written by: Meguru Hinohara
- Published by: Shinshokan
- English publisher: NA: SuBLime
- Imprint: Dear+ Comics
- Magazine: Dear+
- Original run: January 14, 2016 – March 14, 2017
- Volumes: 1
- Manga

Therapy Game
- Published by: Shinshokan
- English publisher: NA: SuBLime
- Imprint: Dear+ Comics
- Magazine: Dear+
- Original run: November 14, 2017 – October 12, 2018
- Volumes: 2
- Manga

Therapy Game: Restart
- Published by: Shinshokan
- Imprint: Dear+ Comics
- Magazine: Dear+
- Original run: October 12, 2019 – present
- Volumes: 5
- Television drama
- Directed by: Misato Kato; Miyako Yasoshima
- Written by: Yō Saitō; Shinju Funabiki
- Studio: Video Planning
- Original network: Nippon TV
- Original run: October 30, 2025 – present

Therapy Game (Japanese: セラピーゲーム, Hepburn: Serapī Gēmu) is a Japanese manga series written and illustrated by Meguru Hinohara. Therapy Game is centered on Minato Mito and Shizuma Ikushima, two characters that were previously introduced as secondary and minor characters in Secret XXX, Hinohara's debut work from 2016. It was serialized in the monthly boys' love manga magazine Dear+ from November 14, 2017, to October 12, 2018. Following Therapy Game's end, a sequel titled Therapy Game: Restart is serialized beginning on October 12, 2019.

A live-action television drama adaptation is scheduled to be broadcast on Nippon TV beginning October 30, 2025.

== Plot ==
=== Secret XXX ===
Shohei Ikushima, a university student, works part-time at Trois Lapins, a shop specializing in rabbits owned by Itsuki Mito. In love with both rabbits and Itsuki, Shohei hides his rabbit allergy from Itsuki in order to stay at his job, but an allergic reaction forces him to reveal his secret. Itsuki, however, reveals that he returns Shohei's feelings and the two become a couple. As their relationship progresses, the two learn more of each other's secrets.

=== Therapy Game ===
Following the events of Secret XXX, Minato Mito, Itsuki's younger brother, develops an interest in Shizuma Ikushima, Shohei's older brother, at a bar. After a drunken evening together, Shizuma cannot remember what happened the previous night, and as revenge, Minato makes a bet with his friends to make Shizuma fall in love with him and then reject him. When Shizuma develops feelings for him, Minato becomes conflicted, as he is forced to acknowledge his own feelings for him.

=== Therapy Game: Restart ===
Shizuma graduates from veterinary school and begins his employment as a veterinarian, but his job leaves him with less time to spend with Minato. After the two agree to move in together, Shizuma prioritizing his career, as well as his boss Yamamoto developing an interest in him, threaten their relationship.

== Characters ==
Minato Mito (三兎 湊, Mito Minato)
Voiced by: Yūki Ono
Minato is a photographer who also works at the rabbit shop Trois Lapins owned by his older brother, Itsuki. He and Itsuki were previously part of the wealthy Kirigaya family until they moved in with their maternal grandmother and adopted her surname. The collapse of his parents' relationship and their subsequent deaths in his childhood has traumatized him so that he cannot bring himself to trust in relationships.
Shizuma Ikushima (生嶋 静真, Ikushima Shizuma)
Voiced by: Tarusuke Shingaki
Shizuma is a veterinary student and Shohei's older brother. He recently ended his relationship with his ex-girlfriend, Yuka, after she cheated on him. He identifies as bisexual.
Shohei Ikushima (生嶋 翔平, Ikushima Shōhei)
Voiced by: Hiro Shimono
A protagonist featured in Secret XXX, Shohei is a university student and a part-time helper at Trois Lapins. He has a rabbit allergy, which he attempts to hide from Itsuki.
Itsuki Mito (三兎 樹, Mito Itsuki)
Voiced by: Daisuke Hirakawa
Itsuki is the owner of Trois Lapins. Unlike Minato, he is able to look at his past from a detached perspective.

== Media ==
=== Manga ===
Meguru Hinohara first published XXX Allergy as her debut short story in the February 2016 issue of Dear+ released on January 14, 2016, which focused on the relationship between Shohei Ikushima, a university student allergic to rabbits, and Itsuki Mito, the owner of a rabbit shop. The story was then expanded into a series titled Secret XXX running from the November to December 2016 issues, followed by a two-chapter story arc titled Relation XXX from the March to April 2017 issues. The chapters were later released as one bound volume titled Secret XXX by Shinshokan under the Dear+ Comics imprint.

Therapy Game was created as a spin-off featuring Shizuma Ikushima and Minato Mito, Shohei and Itsuki's brothers, who were originally introduced in Secret XXX as minor characters. It was serialized from the December 2017 to July 2018 issues of Dear+. It was followed by a three-chapter story arc titled Therapy Game: Play More, which was serialized from the September 2018 to November 2018 issues. The chapters were later released as two bound volumes by Shinshokan under the Dear+ Comics imprint.

A sequel to Therapy Game titled Therapy Game: Restart is serialized beginning on the November 2019 issue of Dear+.

In August 2019, Viz Media licensed the series for North American distribution in English under their SuBLime imprint.

==== Secret XXX ====
No.	Title	Original release date	English release date
1	Secret XXX; Shīkuretto Peke Peke Peke (シークレット×××)	October 2, 2017; 978-4403665981	April 14, 2020; 978-1974712410

==== Therapy Game ====
No.	Title	Original release date	English release date
1	Therapy Game vol. 1 Serapī Gēmu (Ue) (セラピーゲーム（上）)	December 1, 2018; 978-4403666612	June 9, 2020; 978-1974712427
2	Therapy Game vol. 2 Serapī Gēmu (Shita) (セラピーゲーム（下）)	December 28, 2018; 978-4403666667	September 8, 2020; 978-1974712434

==== Therapy Game: Restart ====
No.	Original release date	Original ISBN	English release date	English ISBN
1	December 1, 2020	978-4403667527	December 14, 2021	978-1974726028
2	June 1, 2021	978-4403667756	August 9, 2022	978-1974732241
3	April 1, 2023	978-4403668609	February 13, 2024	978-1974743841
4	May 1, 2023	978-4403668647	May 14, 2024	978-1974746415
5	July 1, 2024	978-4403669385	July 8, 2025	978-1974755257

=== Drama CDs ===
Shinshokan released a series of audio dramas on CD adapting each volume. The drama CD for Secret XXX was released on March 29, 2019, starring Hiro Shimono as Shohei, Daisuke Hirakawa as Itsuki, and Yūki Ono as Minato; the CD peaked at #159 on the Oricon Weekly Albums Chart. Volume 1 of Therapy Game was released on March 13, 2020, with the cast of Secret XXX reprising their roles with Tarusuke Shingaki cast as Shizuma; the CD peaked at #39 on the Oricon Weekly Albums Chart, selling 1,049 physical copies on its first week of release. Volume 2 of Therapy Game was released on April 10, 2020; the CD peaked at #32 on the Oricon Weekly Albums Chart, selling 1,215 physical copies on its first week of release. Therapy Game: Play More is scheduled for release on December 18, 2020.

Shinshokan also produced several mini-drama CDs with original story content that were included as bonuses for Dear+. A mini-drama CD for Secret XXX was released in the May 2019 issue; the issue also included a comic titled Secret XXX Side Story: Photo Shoot. A mini-drama CD for Therapy Game: Restart was released in the November 2019 issue to promote the start of the series, and a second mini-drama CD was released in the December 2020 issue to commemorate the release of its first volume.

=== Television drama ===
A live-action television drama adaptation of Therapy Game was announced on August 29, 2025. The series is scheduled to be broadcast on October 30, 2025, (Note: TV Tokyo lists the broadcast date as October 29, 2025, at 24:59, which is October 30, 2025, at 12:59 a.m.) on Nippon TV. GagaOOLala acquired the streaming rights for the series.

The television drama adaptation is directed by Misato Kato and Miyako Yasojima; it is written by Yō Saitō and Shinju Funabiki. It was produced by Video Planning.

== Reception ==
In 2019, Therapy Game ranked at #7 in the Best Comic category of Chil Chil's 10th annual BL Awards.

Anime News Network praised Therapy Game for its development of Minato's character and realistic portrayal of LGBT issues, while citing discomfort with the non-consensual scenes in the early chapters.
