= Train Train (manga) =

Japanese manga series

トレィン☆トレィン (Torein☆Torein)
- Genre: Comedy
- Manga
- Written by: Eiki Eiki
- Published by: Shinshokan
- English publisher: NA: Digital Manga Publishing
- Magazine: Wings
- Original run: 2002 – 2005
- Volumes: 3

Train☆Train (トレィン☆トレィン, Torein☆Torein) is a manga by Eiki Eiki first published in Wings and licensed by Digital Manga Publishing.

== Reception ==
"Train Train is off the wall screwball comedy that is as energetic as it is funny." — Holly Ellingwood, activeAnime. Leroy Douresseaux gave the first volume a B+ at the Comic Book Bin. "Train☆Train may not have a dramatic or compelling story line, but the humor is light and sweet, and it does give its intended audience what they want - vignettes centering on their favorite cute guy." — Patricia Beard, Mania.
