= Beyond My Touch =

Japanese manga series

- Beyond my Touch

目にはさやかに見えねども (Me Niwa Sayakani Mienedomo)
- Genre: Romance
- Manga
- Written by: Tomo Maeda
- Published by: Shinshokan
- English publisher: US: Digital Manga Publishing
- Magazine: Dear+
- Published: July 2003
- Volumes: 1

Beyond My Touch (目にはさやかに見えねども, Me Niwa Sayakani Mienedomo) is a Japanese manga series written an illustrated by Tomo Maeda and published by Shinshokan.

The volume contains 3 stories; Beyond My Touch, Cool Lips, and Recipe.

== Reception ==
Josephine Fortune, writing for Mania Entertainment, disliked the artist's style of face and felt that the character designs were too similar to each other. However, she felt that the artist's style went well with the supernatural story. Johanna Draper Carlson felt that "the concept was cute", but that the art style did not stand out and Carlson "skipped" reading some of the manga to avoid getting "bored".
