= Princess Princess (manga) =

Japanese manga series

- Cast of Princess Princess, from left to right, Mikoto, Toru and Yuujirou

プリンセス・プリンセス (Purinsesu Purinsesu)
- Genre: Comedy, drama
- Manga
- Written by: Mikiyo Tsuda
- Published by: Shinshokan
- English publisher: NA: Digital Manga Publishing
- Magazine: Wings
- Original run: August 2002 – April 2006
- Volumes: 5
- Manga

Princess Princess +
- Written by: Mikiyo Tsuda
- Published by: Shinshokan
- Magazine: Wings
- Original run: May 2006 – January 2007
- Anime television series
- Directed by: Keitaro Motonaga
- Studio: Studio Deen
- Licensed by: NA: Media Blasters
- Original network: TV Asahi
- English network: US: Toku
- Original run: April 5, 2006 – June 21, 2006
- Episodes: 12
- Video game

Princess Princess: Himetachi no Abunai Hōkago
- Publisher: Marvelous Interactive
- Genre: Visual novel
- Platform: PlayStation 2
- Released: October 26, 2006

Princess Princess (Japanese: プリンセス・プリンセス, Hepburn: Purinsesu Purinsesu) is the title of a fictional series written and illustrated by Japanese author Mikiyo Tsuda about the lives of three high school boys and the school they attend. The series is contained within multiple media pieces which began as a manga first serialized in the manga magazine Wings starting in 2002. After the first manga series ended, a sequel entitled Princess Princess + started serialization in the same magazine in May 2006, and finished in January 2007. An anime has since been adapted from the manga and began airing in Japan on April 5, 2006, produced by the Japanese animation studio, Studio Deen. A live action adaptation called Princess Princess D aired in Japan from June 28, 2006, to September 13, 2006. Finally, a visual novel video game for the PlayStation 2 based on the series was released on October 26, 2006, in Japan.

== Plot ==
Princess Princess is a story revolving around the lives of three boys chosen to dress up as girls at the all-boy school they attend, which also just happens to be the most elite school in the area. The main protagonist, Toru Kouno, has just transferred to a new all-boys school, Fujimori, after living with his uncle for a time. He is one such boy chosen to be one of the Hime (姫) or "Princesses", which is a tradition at the school in order to break up the monotony of life surrounded by nothing but males. Students (based on certain qualifications) are selected to be Princesses and are made to dress up as girls and attend school functions like this.

At the beginning of the story, there are already two such Princesses, Yuujirou Shihodani and Mikoto Yutaka, known as the Western Princess and Eastern Princess respectively, due to their room location. Toru is convinced into becoming a Princess soon after entering the school though once he accepted the job, he found it to be much more enjoyable than he thought.

=== Princess system ===
A candidate for a Princess must be a first year student of the school since they: have more free time from school work, their bodies have not fully developed, and they can easily wear girls' outfits. From all the first years, those with the best looks and most-suited personalities are chosen to be Princesses. However, if one only has good looks but is not popular, that person will not be chosen. The Princesses' duties consist of: wearing girl's clothes to morning meetings or school events, encouraging others at school, and cheering at school events. Students who are required to be Princesses cannot refuse the position.

When there is a conflict between a Princess' work and school classes, absence from class or leaving early can be considered as a school vacation, and the absence will not show up on his attendance record. Every month the Princesses receive thirty school luncheon vouchers each. Therefore, when they eat at school, they do not have to pay. All necessary school supplies (notebooks, school apparel, etc.) are covered by the Princess budget, which is the largest in the whole school. Also, the Princesses will receive partial profit they can use as pocket money from the photography club that takes pictures of the Princesses and sells them to other students. The school rules require the photography club to share profits with whoever serves as model for the photos they sell, and the photographs of the Princesses are the most sought after.

== Characters ==
=== Princess Princess ===
==== Princesses ====
Toru Kouno (河野 亨, Kōno Tōru)
Voiced by: Jun Fukuyama, Takeru Satoh (Live action actor)
He is the primary protagonist of the story who transfers to an all-boys school and becomes one of the Princesses. He seems enthusiastic about it since all the Princesses get a lot of free stuff and added luxuries. His parents died in an accident, which is when his uncle and aunt adopted him. He seems to be very reluctant about spending time with his family, which mainly has to do with his younger step-sister Sayaka, who has an unhealthy obsession with him. He mainly uses his job as a Princess as a distraction from the problems he has with his family and in effect usually gets very into acting like a Princess, much like Yuujirou. He often teams up with Yuujirou to tease Mikoto, much to Mikoto's chagrin. Yuujirou often jokingly says he and Toru are lovers—in fact when Toru's stepsister, Sayaka, comes looking for Toru, Yuujirou kisses him to scare her away; Toru was not amused by this. He reveals to Yuujirou on a day off of school that his ideal girl is the comforting type, which leads to the latter comically asking if Akira fit that type. When Toru answers yes, he seems get flustered when he realizes the actual question.

Toru (left), Yuujirou (center), and Mikoto (right) in various Princess costumes

Yuujirou Shihoudani (四方谷 裕史郎, Shihōdani Yuujirōu)
Voiced by: Romi Park, Ray Fujita (Live action actor)
The Eastern Princess, he is a confident boy and doesn't have many problems with dressing up like a girl in front of other people. He constantly likes to tease Mikoto because he thinks it's fun how Mikoto reacts. He has distanced himself from the rest of his family because he thinks that his mother, step-father, and younger half-brother together are the "perfect family". As the series progress, Yuujirou become quite close to Toru. Toru is the first person he ever opened up to. He and Toru often team up against Mikoto when Mikoto is at odds with them concerning Princess duties. This gets Mikoto to end up agreeing with them, especially since they hold leverage over Mikoto who doesn't want his girlfriend to find out about him being a Princess. Apparently, Yuujirou's idea of a girl for him is one with a perfect figure.

Mikoto Yutaka (豊 実琴, Yutaka Mikoto)
Voiced by: Tetsuya Kakihara, Kenta Kamakari (Live action actor)
The Western Princess, he is more reluctant than the other two Princesses to cross-dress because he does not want his girlfriend Megumi to find out about it. As such he is nonetheless a reliable character—he often stubbornly whines and complains about things the Princesses have to do but always ends up doing them anyway whether he's forced to or not. He is very self-conscious about being a Princess and is mortified whenever someone else outside of school finds out about it. He is the most animated of the three Princesses, always showing a lot of emotion and expression when yelling at Toru and Yuujirou. Mikoto is also tone deaf, having never sung before becoming a princess.

He also cares a lot about the people close to him, though especially for his girlfriend. He has shown to change character and act different when around Megumi, which greatly amuses Toru and Yuujirou. Despite all the whining and complaining, however, he eventually becomes accustomed to his duty as a Princess such that he once had a brief fantasy of him and Megumi both dressed in Gothic Lolita Princess costumes. Princess Princess is not the first media series Mikoto has appeared in. Mikoto's first appearance was as a supporting character from one of Tsuda's earlier manga works, The Day of Revolution, which was about Mikoto's girlfriend, Megumi.

==== Student council ====
Shuya Arisada (有定 修也, Arisada Shūya)
Voiced by: Hiroshi Kamiya, Takumi Saito (Live action actor)
The student council president, he is a very confident person who was also a former Princess one year prior to the beginning of the story, his first year. He is a very good leader and often comes up with fool-proof plans which benefit him and the rest of the student council. He can also be very intimidating to talk with and in effect people often go along with his plans regardless.

Masayuki Koshino (越廼 将行, Koshino Masayuki)
Voiced by: Kousuke Toriumi, Shōta Minami (Live action actor)
The student council vice president who is very strong.

Wataru Harue (春江 渉, Harue Wataru)
Voiced by: Takuma Terashima, Haruhiko Satō (Live action actor)
The student council treasurer, who is very good with math and can solve equations in his head quickly.

Takahiro Tadasu (糺 孝弘, Tadasu Takahiro)
Voiced by: Eiji Miyashita, Hiroshi Yoshihara (Live action actor)
The student council secretary, who has the impressive ability of speed and sleight of hand.

==== Other characters ====
Akira Sakamoto (坂本 秋良, Sakamoto Akira)
Voiced by: Soichiro Hoshi, Osamu Adachi (Live action actor)
The class president in Toru's class (1-D), he is a highly respected member of the school: due to his much-revered older brother and his own excellence in both academic performance and character, he is referred to as "Sakamoto-sama" by his peers regardless of their seniorities, and all students bow when they see him, though he feels somewhat intimidated by such reverence. For pretty much the same reasons, he has been hand-picked by Arisada as the next in line for the student council president and has on quite a number of occasions shown great leadership skills.

He has five immediate family members, all of whom are amazingly beautiful (and, in his sisters' case, androgynous as well). In the past, Akira had often been pointed out as the only "average" looking person in his family by both himself and strangers. For a while, Akira felt out of place or "unworthy" of belonging to his family. When his family found out about his worries, they quickly reassured him and dismissed such ideas. His siblings (especially his older brother and older sister) usually fight for his attention, since their brother is such a kind-hearted and good-natured boy. Akira and his family are the main characters of one of Tsuda's earlier manga works, Family Complex.

Kaoru Natasho (名田 庄薫, Natashō Kaoru)
Voiced by: Anri Katsu, Kōhei Yamamoto (Live action actor)
A third-year student majoring in home economics, he designs all of the clothes that the Princesses wear. He's fairly obsessed about this and always shows a lot of enthusiasm about it. However, he holds a lot of fashion awards for all the costumes he's designed and made himself. When it comes to the Princesses, he's easily struck by inspiration for new costumes.

Harumi Sakamoto (坂本 春海, Sakamoto Harumi)
Voiced by: Kenji Nojima
He's Akira's older brother and a former student at Fujimori who was known by all who knew him as "Sakamoto-sama" because of his amazing beauty. He comes back during the cultural festival to help the student council raise money. Harumi is usually very cool and smiles constantly. However, in the presence of his younger brother, he becomes completely emotional and is easily moved to tears (something which Toru and Yuujirou accidentally notice when visiting Akira, as seen in a manga filler chapter).

Megumi Yoshikawa (吉川 恵, Yoshikawa Megumi)
Voiced by: Junko Takeuchi
Known as Megumi-san by Mikoto due to her being older than he is, she is Mikoto's girlfriend. She has a caring heart and would do things asked of her by Mikoto so as not to upset him. Also, she is not entirely sure of Mikoto's feelings towards her and once even suspected something was going on between Mikoto and the other two Princesses. Megumi and Mikoto seem to have a very good, understanding relationship between them. For instance, even when Megumi finds out Mikoto is a Princess, she says she doesn't care and Mikoto's the same person she loves either way.

She has a very prominent effect on Mikoto's personality, being able to elevate his spirits when he's feeling depressed. Similarly, when around Mikoto she is very happy and it's obvious that they enjoy each other's company. As noted by Mikoto in episode five of the anime, Megumi does not seem to like using makeup because she thinks it's cuter. Mikoto seems to have no complaints over this as he thinks she's cute regardless. Megumi is the main character of Tsuda's earlier series, The Day of Revolution, with Makoto and Mikoto as supporting characters.

Makoto Yutaka (豊 麻琴, Yutaka Makoto)
Voiced by: Risa Hayamizu
She is Mikoto's older sister and has a different personality when compared to her brother. She is very forceful and never seems to back down, especially when the scenario involves Mikoto. Ironically, while Mikoto looks more feminine in appearance, Makoto looks more masculine.

Sayaka Kouno (河野 さやか, Kōno Sayaka)
Voiced by: Chieko Higuchi
The daughter of Toru's aunt and uncle that adopted him, making her Toru's younger step-sister and cousin. She is in love with Toru and is very adamant (to the point of psychosis) about them getting married one day, against the wishes of Toru himself (as his feelings for her never evolved beyond that for a sister). She is overly obsessive with him and has hurt one of Toru's previous girlfriends by shoving her down a set of steps out of jealousy. Her fragile grip on reality was wounded by Yuujirou's claim that he and Toru are lovers- and that Toru is not interested in girls because of this. In vol. 3 of the manga, Sayaka is encountered again by Yuujirou and Toru when they are out shopping, leading to Sayaka apologising, then declaring that in her mind only Yuujirou is worthy of dating Toru and he'd better hurry up and make her "brother" his.

Shinnosuke Shihoudani (四方谷 慎之介, Shihōdani Shin'nosuke)
Voiced by: Sayaka Aoki
He is Yuujirou's younger half-brother who appears in episode nine of the anime and vol. 5 of the manga where he had come with his parents to see his brother at the school festival. He tends to be very shy and at first is especially reluctant to talk with Yuujirou. He has claimed that he wants Yuujirou home more often so he can marry "sister" (Yuujirou in his princess costume).

Ryusaki (リュ先)
Voiced by: Daiki Nakamura
The director of the board who is in charge of the school. He became the director after his father retired. At first, he disapproved of the Princess system and sought to abolish it. Ryusaki only appears in the anime, and greatly resembles Mitaka in appearance and personality.

Toui C. Mitaka (御鷹・C・統威, Mitaka C. Toui)
A transfer student who first appears in volume four of the manga. Upon returning from studies abroad and transferring to Fujimori, Mitaka learns of the student council elections and decides to run against Akira. At first he has a low opinion of Akira, thinking of him as dull and not a worthy opponent, which causes Yuujirou and Toru to dislike him immensely. He eventually warms up to Akira, and by the end of the manga series he is so devoted to him that he is never more than a few feet away from him.

=== Princess Princess + ===
Tomoe Izumi (和泉 巴, Izumi Tomoe)
He is one of the new Princesses chosen by Toru and others. His parents show him little attention because they are often busy and on business.

Kiriya Matsuoka (松岡 桐也, Matsuoka Kiriya)
He is also one of the new Princesses chosen by Toru and others. He lost his parents, and now lives with his elder brother and younger sister.

== Media ==
=== Manga ===
The Princess Princess manga, written and illustrated by Mikiyo Tsuda, was first serialized in the manga magazine Wings, with the first tankōbon volume being released at August 2002. The series was published by Shinshokan in five volumes. Once the first manga series ended, a sequel entitled Princess Princess + started serialization in the May 2006 issue of Wings. The first manga series has been licensed by Digital Manga Publishing, with the first volume released in November 2006. Mikiyo has commented that Wings preferred her not to write it as a shōnen-ai series.

=== Anime ===
The anime series of Princess Princess based on the manga that preceded it aired in Japan from April 5 to June 21, 2006, and had twelve episodes. The opening theme is "Kimi to Deatte Kara" (キミと出逢ってから, Because I Met You) by Atsushi Miyazawa, and the ending theme is "Hohoemi o Agetai" (微笑みをあげたい, I Want to Give You a Smile) by team-F. The series premiered on Toku in the United States in January 2016.

==== Episodes ====
No.	Title	Original release date
1	"The All Boys School's Princesses" "Danshikō no Purinsesu" (男子校のプリンセス)	April 5, 2006
Toru Kouno is joining a new all-boys school in the middle of the semester. As soon as he arrives, he sees a beautiful girl, who is running from students calling her "Princess". After being led to his classroom by the teacher, he is surprised to receive a warm welcome by all his classmates (who are looking at him in a weird way). The class president, Sakomoto is asked to guide him around the school and he is seated beside a beautiful boy named Shihodani (who looks like a girl). The teacher says that Toru is "that" and asks Shihodani to take care of him. At lunch time, Shihodani seems to be surrounded by admirers. While Sakamoto takes Toru for a tour around the tour, Toru notices that everyone, including the seniors, are bowing their head to Sakamoto in respect and call him "Sakamoto-sama". After school, Shohidani takes him to the dorms. He is introduced to the dorm head, third-year Tsuji. Toru is led into the "P-room", short for "Princess room". Since Shihodani already shares a room with Mikoto, he is asked to move out; Toru recognizes him as being the same girl he met at the entrance and is surprised. He is introduced to the "Princess system" where the beautiful boys in the school are nominated and dressed as girls to "relieve the stress" in the all-boys school. Toru is pretty surprised by this system, but even more shocked when he learns that he himself is nominated as a Princess candidate.
2	"A Princess is Born" "Hime Tanjō" (姫誕生)	April 12, 2006
Toru, Yuujirou and Mikoto are summoned to the Student Council, where the Student Council members are all introduced to Toru by the president, Arisada. The president presents to Toru all the benefits of becoming a princess – after hearing which, Toru readily accepts to be a princess, even as Mikoto keeps disapproving (since he has a girlfriend already, he does not like dressing up like a girl). The princesses' clothes' designer Natashou also appears, completely exhilarated about new inspiration found by looking at all the Princesses. It is also revealed that Arisada is a former princess. Planning for the "New Princess Introduction" is also started. Mikoto immediately observes that Toru is quickly getting used to his Princess role and has already learnt how to deal with the fans. Toru says that he has learnt it from Yuujirou, who keeps everyone at bay by being sweet and having the pride and confidence of a queen. Mikoto also rehearses a little and succeeds at this. They also try out the new costumes to be used for the ceremony. Later when they meet Arisada who is overseeing the preparations for the ceremony, Sakamoto is also present, helping. Arisada says this is because Sakamoto is the next presidential candidate (this, even Sakamoto didn't know) and they all realize that it's because of Arisada that everyone calls Sakamoto "Sakamoto-sama" - he started it himself. The ceremony finally happens, where the Princesses ask each other to take care of them.
3	"The First Job, Princess Cheerleader" "Hatsu Shigoto, Hime-sama Ouendan" (初仕事、姫様応援団)	April 19, 2006
The three Princesses are to cheer for all the clubs, for the local preliminaries. Arisada also tells them that they are all to go for cheering all the clubs which win the preliminaries (and also those which go ahead and win the national finals) or the princess benefits will be cut - Arisada has gone even to the national games for cheering. But Mikoto is against this since he has to dress up as a girl and go outside the school premises. Going along with Arisada's idea, Natashou has designed the costumes to be nurses for the local preliminaries, cheerleaders for the prefectural and wedding dress for the national finals! Mikoto is entirely against this idea of being a man's bride. but Mikoto is nowhere to be found. Toru tries to convince him saying that if the teams do not win, they would not need to dress up and go out, but it seems that all the teams are trying extra hard to win with the Princesses cheering them, following the cheering tactics provided by Arisada. Completely beat up in the evening, Mikoto again sees that Toru is doing pretty fine with the Princess job - when he says that its easy when you want to do things yourself than when others force it on you. After two weeks of this regime, they see that teams are indeed winning the preliminaries with exceptional performances. So, the Princesses have to dress up in their special costumes to go cheering now - but Mikoto again throws a tantrum that he doesn't want to go out in dresses. The morning when they are to go cheering, Mikoto is nowhere to be seen. As toru and Yuujirou start searching for him, they find him trying out the costume - Mikoto remembered Toru's words about wanting to do thing by oneself and wanted to try putting on the costume himself. Finally, all the Princesses get along together again, with the special costumes on to go for cheering.
4	"Yuujirou's Past" "Yūjirō no Kako" (裕次郎の過去)	April 26, 2006
Summer vacation has arrived, and Yuujirou and Toru stay behind in the dorms to talk about their pasts as Mikoto leaves to spend time with his girlfriend, Megumi.
5	"Stalked Princesses" "Nera Wareta Hime" (狙われた姫)	May 3, 2006
Even though it is summer, the Princesses still have to cheer for sports teams and other clubs. Even Mikoto is called back for Princess work. As the princesses get ready, Sakamoto also accompanies them. As they are moving about, Toru has the creepy feeling that the Princesses are being watched. When they get to the Home Ec room, they see that the Princesses' costumes are laid on a sea of roses. Sakamoto tells the Princesses not to enter the room and fetches the Student Council members, who start investigating immediately. When Arisada gets to know that someone is watching them, he asks the princesses to stop their work until things are clear. But as the culprit does not come forth by the investigation, they decide to use the Princesses as bait and lure the culprit out. Even though they are reluctant to the idea, the Princesses soon agree since Mikoto says that he does not want the ones dear to him (meaning his girlfriend) to be affected in any way from this. As the Princess again start making their rounds, they come across a man photographing them. The Student Council captures him and it is revealed that he is from an agency and wants to make the Princesses as idols after he saw them at the tournament. Although he admits that he had been taking the Princesses' photos, he did not send any flowers. While everyone is still puzzled over who sends the flowers Natasho senpai comes floating out of nowhere, holding bouquet of roses and hands them to the Princesses claiming to have so found new inspiration.
6	"Sakamoto's Family Secret!" "Sakamoto ke no Himitsu!" (坂本家のヒミツ!)	May 10, 2006
Finally getting some free time, Toru and Yuujirou start with their summer homework. But they find some problems difficult to solve and so decide to go to Sakamoto's house to ask him for help (Sakamoto had invited them over earlier). they are also hopeful of meeting the famous older "Sakamoto-sama". When they finally arrive, Sakamoto warns them not to get too surprised by what they see, but Toru and Yuujirou convince him, that as princesses they are used to almost all surprises. When they arrive to Sakamoto's house, they see that, once after the other, all the family members they meet are exceptionally beautiful, to the point that they even ask Sakamoto if they are his real family. They meet everyone but the older brother "Sakamoto-sama". Later, when they are about to have barbecue, Sakamoto asks them to consider him too as their friend. Toru and Yuujirou accept and they all decide to call each other by their first names. Suddenly, the older Sakamoto arrives and baffles Toru and Yuujirou by being pretty childish over Akira not calling him to the barbecue.
7	"A Chorus Concert with Sweat and Tears" "Ase to Namida no Kashō Konkūru" (汗と涙の合唱コンクール)	May 17, 2006
The Princesses have to put on a song and dance opening act for the choir group at their school, but there is one small problem: Mikoto cannot sing. During practice, Toru meets his cousin, who wants him to come back and marry her.
8	"The Princesses' Existence Endangered!?" "Hime Sonzoku no Kiki!?" (姫存続の危機!?)	May 24, 2006
The director of the board who is in charge of the school comes to visit after inheriting the position from his father and is shocked to find out about the Princess system. So shocked, that he seeks to remove the system entirely.
9	"The School Festival Starts!" "Gakuensai Kaishi!" (学園祭開始!)	May 31, 2006
The school's cultural festival has finally started and the Princesses are hard at work once again. During the festival, Yuujirou's family comes to visit.
10	"Lovers' Time" "Koibitotachi no jikan" (恋人たちの時間)	June 7, 2006
Mikoto's girlfriend, Megumi, and his older sister, Makoto, come to visit him at school during the cultural festival, and things do not go exactly as planned.
11	"Secret Past" "Himerareta Kako" (秘められた過去)	June 14, 2006
With the school festival over, things are supposed to get back to normal, but strange things start happening to Yuujirou.
12	"The Path a Princess Chooses" "Hime no erabu michi" (姫の選ぶ道)	June 21, 2006
The chase continues to find out what Sayaka is doing at Toru's school, and later Toru has to decide whether stay at the school or return home. In the end, he decides to stay.

=== Live action drama ===
A live action drama based loosely on the series, named Princess Princess D (プリンセス・プリンセスD, Purinsesu Purinsesu Dī), aired on TV Asahi from June 28, 2006, to September 13, 2006, for ten episodes. The D in the title is for drama. Mikoto is the protagonist of this series. The story deviates from the original manga in that a new character named Otoya Hanazono, who is dissatisfied with the half-hearted efforts of the current Princesses, creates his own team of Dark Princesses to rival for the students' attention. The drama also excludes Mikoto's girlfriend, Megumi, and like the anime series features shōnen-ai overtones that are less present in the original manga.

=== Visual novel ===
A visual novel based on the series named Princess Princess: Himetachi no Abunai Hōkago (プリンセス・プリンセス 姫たちのアブナい放課後) was released on October 26, 2006, for the PlayStation 2 in Japan.

== Reception ==
Casey Brienza described the anime as "phony" and disliked its premise of forced cross-dressing.
