= Hey, Class President! =

Japanese manga series

- Cover of Hey, Class President! first volume as published by Shinshokan

生徒会長に忠告 (Seitokaichou ni Chukoku)
- Genre: Yaoi
- Manga
- Written by: Kaori Monchi
- Published by: Shinshokan
- English publisher: NA: 801 Media
- Magazine: Dear+
- Original run: 2003 – on hiatus
- Volumes: 7
- Original video animation
- Directed by: Keiji Kawakubo
- Studio: PrimeTime
- Released: November 27, 2009 – April 30, 2010
- Runtime: 30 minutes each
- Episodes: 2

Hey, Class President! (生徒会長に忠告, Seitokaichou ni Chukoku) is a Japanese yaoi manga written and illustrated by Kaori Monchi. The manga was serialized in Shinshokan's Dear+ magazine and the serial chapters collected into seven tankōbon, the first one released in September 2005. It is licensed in English by 801 Media, and the volumes were first released March 2009 . It is licensed in German as "Highschool Love" by Egmont Manga and Anime.

== Plot ==
This story centers on two high school students, Kokusai and Chiga. It comes in a manga form, where it extends a few chapters and also exists in a shorter anime form where it extends for only two episodes. The story is a romance between both of the high school students and largely follows the yaoi genre, dominant in Japanese literature. In the anime, the two students are shown to mainly interact at a judo club, where they spar together. Kokusai holds a leadership position as the class president and as the senior martial artist at the club while the younger Chiga is just a regular. The story starts with an entry level martial artist and Chiga cleaning up the judo activity room. The conversation steers toward the class president and the young member tells Chiga the latest rumor, that the old vice president was accused of sexually assaulting the president Kokusai. Chiga is visually upset by this and the entry level member is confused as to why he reacts so strongly. Kokusai then enters and talks about looking for a replacement for vice president. He laments about how his friend Akutsu declined the position and how he needs to continue looking for someone. Chiga asks him why he did not ask him to fill the position and after some pressure, Kokusai admits he had originally thought of Chiga but did not want to ask him as he knew Chiga (unlike his other friend) would take the position very seriously and might be burdened by it.

Chiga is touched and says he will gladly take the position. They bond for a bit while the entry level member notes their intense and intrinsic chemistry. Chiga and Kokusai enter the subway and Chiga is confused to see his friend looking uncomfortable and strange. Kokusai later tells him that he is constantly sexually assaulted on the train by men who grab him and make him feel uncomfortable. Chiga is upset and privately wonders what it is about this homely and average man that draws people to him. He inadvertently starts checking him out and suddenly realizes he is admiring him and he recoils in surprise. He decides to protect Kokusai and repel the perverts on the train. As men try to get close to his friend, he pushes them away and defends his friends chastity. However, in doing so, he positions himself very closely to his friend and starts acting inappropriately as well, sniffing his friends hair and neck and leaning close to him. He realizes what he is doing and cuts it out. Chiga mentions how he needs to get a haircut and Kokusai expresses interest in going with him so they agree to go together. Later in the evening, after taking a shower, Chiga reaches into the closet to pick out his clothes in advance and notices that he is a lot more anxious for the reunion than he expected. He gets a call by Kokusai and nervously responds to him. They speak but Kokusai tells him to wait as he is getting a call by Akutsu.

He returns and jokes about how his friend asked him if its weird that he always carries extra condoms. Chiga gets jealous but they return to talking about their plan for the next day and Chiga says goodnight in a tender and unique tone. They meet up and Chiga notices his friend is wearing new clothes. He realizes that just as he went out and bought new clothes to look his best, so did Kokusai. Out of the corner of his eye, he sees someone watching them. Once the guy realizes he has been caught, he deftly hides, too quickly for Chiga to make him out. Chiga senses this person is dangerous and makes a mental note of this intimidating presence. En route to the barbershop, a group of girls ask for them to pose for a picture since they are making a calendar of hot guys. Chiga originally doesn't want to but the girl suggest they pose for the picture together and he gets really into the idea. He starts pressuring Kokusai to accept, grabbing his wrist and pulling him close to him. Kokusai gets frightened and runs off. Chiga later finds him and apologizes for pressuring him after Kokusai apologizes for being too shy to pose for the picture. They get close and Chiga kisses Kokusai, surrendering to his attraction to him. Later Kokusai returns home and finds that the door is open and unlocked. Not thinking much about it, he reflects on his make out session with Chiga and realizes he is really into him. Chiga calls him and asks if it was Kokusai's first kiss. He asks because he doesn't know if his friend was saving it and would feel bad if that were the case. Kokusai tells him not to patronize him and they awkwardly talk for a minute. Chiga asks him not to be awkward since that will make him feel embarrassed and ruin their chemistry. Kokusai feels kind of unsafe so he asks Chiga to stay on the line while he locks the windows.

Chiga laughs but agrees. Kokusai goes to lock the windows but notes that the windows are already locked and he finds this strange as he did not remember doing that. He sits down on the couch and falls asleep. The intimidating man who was spying on them earlier steps out of the shadows and approaches the sleeping Kokusai, getting near him. Meanwhile, Kokusai dreams he is wrestling with a random man at the judo class. The random person turns into his friend Chiga and then struggle together, very homoerotically. The dream version of Chiga starts seducing Kokusai and Kokusai resists but appears very into it. Chiga starts talking dirty to him, calling him names and Kokusai gets nervous as he knows that Chiga respects him too much to speak to him like that. Kokusai realizes the man in his dream is not really Chiga and suddenly he awakens to see the real Chiga, trying to wake him up. Chiga rushed there after being called by Akutsu, who told him to check up on Kokusai. He realizes immediately by the unbuttoned pants and raised shirt that someone has sexually abused Kokusai. He hugs him tightly and the first episode ends.

== Characters ==
- Yasuhiro Chiga (知賀 泰広, Chiga Yasuhiro) - Voiced by: Tomokazu Sugita
- Yuuzou Kokusai (国斉 裕三, Kokusai Yūzō) - Voiced by: Kosuke Toriumi
- Masashi Kondou (近藤 武蔵, Kondō Masashi) - Voiced by: Daisuke Kishio
- Naoya Akutsu (阿久津 直也, Akutsu Naoya) - Voiced by: Takehito Koyasu

== Reception ==
Leroy Douresseaux felt the story depended on desire, rather than characters or sex, describing the artwork as a "fever dream of want", but felt that in the second volume, the characterization improved. Rachel Bentham described the artwork as "wind swept" and said that the second volume's sex scenes were the most explicit that she had encountered. Danielle Leigh enjoyed the protagonists' "stumbling attempts to connect on a deeper level".
