= Bond(z) =

Japanese manga anthology

ボンズ (Bonzu)
- Genre: Yaoi
- Manga
- Written by: Toko Kawai
- Published by: Biblos
- English publisher: NA: 801 Media
- Magazine: Magazine Be × Boy
- Published: December 20, 2003

Bond(z) (ボンズ, Bonzu) is a Japanese manga anthology written and illustrated by Toko Kawai. It is licensed in North America by 801 Media which released the manga in April 2007, and in France by Taifu Comics.

== Reception ==
Julie Rosato, writing for Mania Entertainment, noted that Kawai's style seems to be "characterized by long noses, large mouths and thin eyes", and that the characters look too similar to each other. Rosato enjoyed the "mature" first story, and found the last two stories "precious and angsty". Christopher Butcher praised the first story as being "really, really well put together", and felt the others in the volume were also "strong". A Publishers Weekly reviewer described the characters in the manga as being "sexy, believable characters with complex problems". Holly Ellingwood, writing for Active Anime, felt the fantasy short "Kitan Garden" had the best art.
