= Yoji Iwase =

Japanese actor (born 2004)

- Born: January 6, 2004 (age 22); Hyogo Prefecture, Japan
- Other name: Yuuki Ohsugi (大杉 侑暉)
- Occupation: Actor
- Years active: 2020–present
- Agent: A-Plus

Japanese name
- Kanji: 岩瀬 洋志
- Hiragana: いわせ ようじ
Transcriptions
- Romanization: Yōji Iwase
- Website: yoji-iwase.com

Yoji Iwase (岩瀬 洋志(いわせ ようじ), Iwase Yōji; born January 6, 2004) is a Japanese actor. He is managed by the talent agency A-Plus.

== Career ==
In 2019, when Iwase was in his sophomore year of high school, a senior student took a picture of him waiting for a train and posted it on TikTok with the caption "My junior is cute", it quickly went viral and attracted much attention.

In May of the following year, after the video of him gained attention, his Instagram account had amassed 170,000 followers, but he later posted that he was tired and would take a break from social media for the time being; he then deleted all of his social media accounts. In August of the same year, Iwase was scouted by a talent agency and made his debut in the entertainment industry, he joined the talent agency acali and made his debut as an actor under the stage name "Yuuki Ohsugi (大杉 侑暉)".

In September 2021, Iwase made his acting debut in season 2 of the web drama My Graduation Project. On August 27 of the following year, he made his television debut in the drama Love You Just as You Are.

In February 2023, Iwase left acali and ended his activities with the agency. On the 11th of the same month, he made his first film appearance in the web movie Icarus: The Town of One Wing inspired by Hata Motohiro's light novel, Icarus. In March of the same year, Iwase moved to the talent agency A-PLUS and changed his stage name back to his real name, Yoji Iwase. In July, he made regular appearances in the Saturday television drama The Greatest Teacher by Nippon Television.

In January 2024, Iwase appeared in the crime and suspense television drama Captured New Airport, as Naoki Tamba. In June, he launched his official fanclub website "Daphne". Later in July, Iwase landed his first lead role in the television drama Takara's Treasure, he also appeared in the drama Minami-kun is my lover!? by TV Asahi.

In December 2025, he won first place in the "NEXT" category of the women's fashion magazine Vivi's popularity poll, "ViVi National Treasure-level Handsome Men Ranking for the Second Half of 2025".

== Personal life ==
Yoji Iwase was born on January 6, 2004, in Hyogo Prefecture. His hobbies include playing the guitar and watching koshien tournaments. He is skilled in skateboarding and karate.

== Filmography ==
=== Film ===
Year	Title	Role	Notes	Ref.
2023	Icarus: The Town of One Wing			
2025	A Girl & Her Guard Dog	Ruka		
2026	Yamaguchi-kun Isn't So Bad	Rio Ishizaki		
2026	Tokyo MER: Mobile Emergency Room – Capital Crisis	So Takinogawa		
2026	Finding My Punchline	Morikey		
2027	Gacha	Yuta		

=== Television drama ===
Year	Title	Role	Notes	Ref.
2021	My Graduation Project	Taniguchi	Season 2	
2022	Love You Just as You Are		Episode 4	
2023	The Greatest Teacher	Taijiro Toyama		
2023	Dear Adult You	Taijiro Toyama	Web series; episode 6, spin-off	
2023	Muddy Table	Taniguchi		
2024	Captured New Airport	Monkey/Naoki Tamba		
2024	Takara's Treasure	Takara Shiga	Lead role	
2024	Superstar Minami Is My Boyfriend!?	Eto		
2024	Snowdrop's First Love	Riku Mochizuki		
2024	Octo: Emotional Investigator Akari Kokoro	Minato Imanishi	Season 2	
2025	Notice: What Happens in the Haunted Property	Yuto Mayama	Lead role	
2025	Kita-kun, Our Shared Love	Manaka Kita		
2026	Dream Stage	Ryo		

=== Commercials ===
Year	Company	Notes	Ref.
2024	Lancôme	Ambassador	

== Bibliography ==
=== Photobook ===
- LYRE (September 3, 2024, Kodansha ) ISBN 978-4-0653-6073-6

=== Calendar ===
- Desktop Iwase Yoji 2025 Calendar (2024, Hagoromo)
