= Challengers (manga) =

Japanese manga series

- Cover of Vol 1 of the DramaQueen English translation

チャレンジャーズ (Charenjāzu)
- Genre: Yaoi, Comedy
- Manga
- Written by: Hinako Takanaga
- Published by: Hakusensha (original), Kaiōsha (current)
- English publisher: NA: DramaQueen
- Magazine: Hanamaru Manga
- Original run: 1995 – 1999
- Volumes: 4

Challengers (Japanese: チャレンジャーズ, Hepburn: Charenjāzu) is a yaoi manga by the Japanese manga artist Hinako Takanaga, who also authored Little Butterfly and The Devil's Secret. The first volume of this series was originally called Goukaku kigan (合格祈願; Prayers for a passing grade) before the series was retitled Challengers. Challengers is licensed in German by Tokyopop Germany under the title Küss mich, Student! and in French by Taifu Comics under the title Rien n'est impossible. A spin-off series to Challengers, which follows Tomoe's older brother Souichi, is titled The Tyrant Falls in Love.

== Plot ==
Tomoe Tatsumi, a high school student from Nagoya, goes on a trip to Tokyo to take a university entrance exam. He gets lost wandering around Tokyo when he runs into Mitsugu Kurokawa, an office worker who had been out drinking with his friend Isogai. Isogai throws up on Tomoe and so Kurokawa takes him to clean his now ruined coat and tells him he'll help him find his hotel, but then they realize that the address to the hotel is in his coat pocket which is now in the wash, further complicating the situation.

Since Kurokawa has an extra room at his place, he offers to let Tomoe stay at his place for the night. Tomoe accepts and the next morning he goes off to take his entrance exam. When Tomoe is getting on the train back to Nagoya, Kurokawa kisses him. Tomoe appears shocked and appalled at this and Kurokawa thinks he'll never hear from him again, but is surprised to receive a post card from Tomoe telling him that he passed the entrance exam. When Tomoe returns to Tokyo to look for a place to live, he asks for Kurokwa's help and Kurokawa offers to let him sub-lessee the extra room in his apartment. Tomoe thinks it would be a good idea since it would save his family money and accepts the offer. Kurokawa eventually confesses his love to Tomoe and their relationship develops gradually, but not without interference from various friends and relatives.

Tomoe's short-tempered older brother, Souichi Tatsumi, is suspicious of the living arrangement and tries many times to get Tomoe to move back home. It is revealed that Souichi is homophobic because he was almost raped by one of his professors at his university but his lab assistant, Morinaga, saved him. As it so happens, Morinaga is gay and has had a crush on Souichi for 4 years starting from the moment he saw him. While sick with a cold, Morinaga inadvertently confesses that he is gay and in love with Souichi. Following this, he thought that Souichi would hate him because of his homophobia, and said he would leave school, but Souichi insists that they forget about it and remain friends. It also helps Souichi accept Tomoe's relationship more and he stops trying to force him to come home. Souichi and Morinaga's story is continued in the spin-off series, The Tyrant Falls in Love.

== Characters ==
- Tomoe Tatsumi
- Mitsugu Kurokawa
- Taichirou Isogai
- Souichi Tatsumi
- Tetsuhiro Morinaga
- Richard Coldman
- Reiko Hino
- Phil Lloyd

== Manga List ==
No.	Original release date	Original ISBN	English release date	English ISBN
1	November 1996 (Original); March 10, 2004 (Gush re-release)	978-4592203216 (Original); ISBN 978-4-87724-337-1 (Gush re-release)	March, 2006	978-0976604532
2	November 1997 (Original); April 10, 2004 (Gush re-release)	978-4592204114 (Original); ISBN 978-4-87724-344-9 (Gush re-release)	August, 2006	978-0976604549
3	November 1998 (Original); May 10, 2004 (Gush re-release)	978-4592204206 (Original); ISBN 978-4-87724-351-7 (Gush re-release)	January, 2007	978-0976604556
4	June 10, 2004 (Gush)	978-4877243548 (Gush)	March, 2007	978-0976604563

== Reception ==
Julie Rosato noted that it was obvious that Challengers, dating from 1995, was one of Takanaga's early works, as the art is not as polished as her later works, and there are some cliches in the storyline. However, Rosato found the first volume on the whole amusing. Writing about the second volume, Rosato feels that although the story is like other BL, Takanaga's execution is entertaining.
