= Takara's Treasure =

Japanese manga series

- Cover of the Japanese version, released on August 1, 2022

タカラのびいどろ (Takara no Bīdoro)
- Genre: Romance, boys' love
- Manga
- Written by: Minta Suzumaru
- Published by: Shinshokan
- English publisher: NA: SuBLime
- Imprint: Dear+ Comics
- Magazine: Dear+
- Original run: September 14, 2020 – April 13, 2022
- Volumes: 1
- Television drama
- Directed by: Yuho Ishibashi; Miki Tomita; Ryōma Kosasa
- Written by: Ayumi Shimo; Yuho Ishibashi; Miki Tomita
- Licensed by: GagaOOLala
- Original network: BS Asahi; TV Kanagawa; RKB; HBC; CBC
- Original run: July 1, 2024 – September 9, 2024
- Episodes: 10 + special

Takara's Treasure (Japanese: タカラのびいどろ, Hepburn: Takara no Bīdoro; lit. "Takara's Vidro" (Note: Vidro is the Portuguese word for "glass". In Japan, "vidro" refers to a type of blown glass craft produced in Nagasaki, Japan, for 400 years, since Japan had been trading with Portugal.)) is a Japanese manga series by Minta Suzumaru (鈴丸みんた). It is serialized in the monthly boys' love manga magazine Dear+ from September 14, 2020, to April 14, 2022. A live-action television drama adaptation was broadcast on BS Asahi, TV Kanagawa, RKB Mainichi Broadcasting, Hokkaido Broadcasting, and Chubu-Nippon Broadcasting from July 1, 2024, to September 9, 2024.

== Plot ==
After the death of his pet cockatiel, Taishin Nakano remembers being comforted by university student Takara Shiga. Unable to forget his kindness, Taishin moves to Tokyo and enrolls in the same university as him to thank him. Though Takara is cold towards Taishin, he can't help but be drawn towards Taishin's pure and straightforward personality.

== Characters ==
Takara Shiga (志賀 宝, Shiga Takara)
Voiced by: Ryōta Suzuki (audio drama), Portrayed by: Yoji Iwase (TV drama)
Takara is described as handsome and a kuudere (a person who appears to be calm and cool but has an affectionate side).
Taishin Nakano (中野 大進, Nakano Taishin)
Voiced by: Yūsuke Kobayashi (audio drama), Portrayed by: Eito Konishi (TV drama)
Taishin speaks in a Hakata dialect. He has a straightforward personality.

== Media ==
=== Manga ===
Takara's Treasure is written and illustrated by Minta Suzumaru. It is serialized in the monthly boys' love manga magazine Dear+ from the October 2020 issue released on September 14, 2020, to the May 2022 issue released on April 14, 2022. The chapters were later released in one bound volume by Shinshokan under the Dear+ Comics imprint.

In 2022, Suzumaru stated through an interview with Chil Chil that the inspiration behind Takara's Treasure was that they wanted to draw a boy who speaks a local dialect. The pitch that they wrote for the story described the boy as "[chasing] the person he wants to meet to the end of hell! He's holding a knife!" It was later changed to "a brave and pure boy who goes to see the person he wants to meet! His eyes are sparkling!" Suzumaru stated that the direction of the story had changed, and the ending of the original draft would have been an "open-ended" or a "bad ending".

On February 17, 2024, Viz Media announced that they would distribute the manga in English in both print and digital formats through their SuBLime imprint.

No.	Original release date	Original ISBN	English release date	English ISBN
1	August 1, 2022	978-4403668241	September 10, 2024	978-1974749621

=== Audio drama ===
An audio drama adapting Takara's Treasure was released onto CD by Shinshokan on July 28, 2023. It stars Yūsuke Kobayashi as Taishin and Ryōta Suzuki as Takara.

=== Television drama ===
A live-action television drama adaptation of Takara's Treasure was announced on May 14, 2024. It was broadcast beginning July 1, 2024, on BS Asahi, TV Kanagawa, RKB Mainichi Broadcasting, Hokkaido Broadcasting, and Chubu-Nippon Broadcasting.

The series stars Yoji Iwase as Takara and Eito Konishi as Taishin. Supporting cast members include Yui Mihara as Emiri Shinomiya, Ayaka Shimoda as Mei Hyōdō, and Kento Yamada as Kenzo Yukawa, Taishin's friends and classmates; Kazuya Asami as Akira Ishikawa, Yuri Kasama as Minami Uehashi, and Saaya Minase, members in Takara's club; Gaku Sano as Masaya Yamagata, Takara's friend; Kazuyuki Matsuzawa as Hōei Shiga, Takara's grandfather; and Mari Nishio as Tomiko Nakano, Taishin's mother.

The television drama adaptation is directed by Yuho Ishibashi, Miki Tomita, and Ryōma Kosasa. The screenplay is written by Ayumi Shimo, Ishibashi, and Tomita. The opening theme is "Clear" by Claquepot, and the ending theme is "Vidro" by Androp, who wrote the song specifically for the show. Filming for the drama took about a month and a half. Konishi had to get a dialect coach to learn how to speak the Hakata dialect.

==== Episodes ====
No.	Title	Original release date
1	"Episode 1"; Transliteration: "Dai-ichi-wa" (Japanese: 第1話)	July 1, 2024
2	"Episode 2"; Transliteration: "Dai-ni-wa" (Japanese: 第2話)	July 8, 2024
3	"Episode 3"; Transliteration: "Dai-san-wa" (Japanese: 第3話)	July 15, 2024
4	"Episode 4"; Transliteration: "Dai-yon-wa" (Japanese: 第4話)	July 22, 2024
5	"Episode 5"; Transliteration: "Dai-go-wa" (Japanese: 第5話)	July 29, 2024
6	"Episode 6"; Transliteration: "Dai-roku-wa" (Japanese: 第6話)	August 5, 2024
7	"Episode 7"; Transliteration: "Dai-nana-wa" (Japanese: 第7話)	August 12, 2024
8	"Episode 8"; Transliteration: "Dai-hachi-wa" (Japanese: 第8話)	August 19, 2024
9	"Episode 9"; Transliteration: "Dai-kyū-wa" (Japanese: 第9話)	August 26, 2024
10	"Episode 10"; Transliteration: "Dai-jū-wa" (Japanese: 第10話)	September 2, 2024
Spin–off	"Spin-off (Taishin Turns 20)"; Transliteration: "Taishin, Hatachi ni Naru" (Japanese: 大進、ハタチになる)	September 9, 2024

== Reception ==
Takara's Treasure won the 2023 Digital Comic Award by Comic CMoa in the BL category along with My Personal Weatherman by Nikke Taino. It also won 3rd place for Best Comic in the 2023 Chil Chil BL Awards. The audio drama won 1st place for the BL CD category in the 2024 BL Awards.

The Television reviewed the live-action drama adaptation favorably.
