= Dear Myself =

Japanese manga

- Genre: Yaoi
- Manga
- Written by: Eiki Eiki
- Published by: Shinshokan
- English publisher: NA: Digital Manga Publishing
- Published: January 1998
- Volumes: 1
- Manga

World's End
- Written by: Eiki Eiki
- Published by: Shinshokan
- English publisher: NA: Digital Manga Publishing
- Magazine: Dear+
- Published: June 1999
- Volumes: 1

Dear Myself is a Japanese manga written and illustrated by Eiki Eiki, with a sequel, World's End. They are licensed in North America by Digital Manga Publishing which released Dear Myself in August 2006 and World's End in October 2007. They are licensed in France by Asuka and in Germany by Egmont Manga.

== Reception ==
Andrea Lipinski, writing for School Library Journal recommended Dear Myself for grades 10 and up, describing it as "a thought-provoking story for mature readers". Danielle Van Gorder, writing about World's End for Mania Entertainment, noted that Eiki Eiki's artistic strength was in her drawings of eyes, but felt that the shifting personalities of the protagonists did not come off as being natural, and that their relationship shifted from being healthy to being "codependent". Holly Ellingwood, writing for Active Anime, enjoyed the "layered character development" of World's End compared to other yaoi manga. Jason Thompson, writing for the appendix to Manga: The Complete Guide, felt that World's End "reaches new depths in Eiki Eiki's glorification of pathological behavior".
