= Boys Love (manga) =

Japanese manga

- Genre: Yaoi
- Manga
- Written by: Kaim Tachibana
- Published by: Shinshokan
- English publisher: NA: Digital Manga Publishing
- Magazine: Dear+
- Published: 2007

Boys Love (ボーイズ ラブ) is a Japanese manga written and illustrated by Kaim Tachibana. It is licensed in North America by Digital Manga Publishing, which released the first volume through its imprint DokiDoki, on September 23, 2009. It is licensed in Germany by Egmont Manga & Anime and Taiwan by Ching Win Publishing. The story is based on the 2006 film Boys Love and the follow-up 2007 film Boys Love, the Movie both co-written directed by Kotaro Terauchi.

== Reception ==
Jennifer Dunbar enjoyed the portrayal of the relationship between the characters, but felt the ending was "predictable and lame", as it required previously intelligent characters to be in a state of "moronic inaction". Leroy Douresseaux felt that the manga "challenges, rather than delivering the usual pleasures". Danielle Leigh felt that the character designs for both leads reflected their personalities well.
