= Koi wa Ina Mono Myōna Mono =

2002 Japanese manga

- Genre: Romance, Yaoi
- Manga
- Written by: Taishi Zaō
- Published by: Shinshokan
- Magazine: Dear+
- Published: 2002
- Volumes: 1

Koi wa Ina Mono Myōna Mono or also known as Koiha Ina Mono Mouna Mono (恋は異なもの妙なもの; trans. Love is a Strange and Different Thing) is a fictional manga written and illustrated by Japanese author Taishi Zaō (also known for her shōjo works under the name Mikiyo Tsuda) in 2002.

The story focuses on the character, Masafumi Tamura, a sixteen-year-old high school boy who is a psychic of sorts. He has had foreseeing dreams ever since he was a young child, and the dreams he has always come true. As he grows older and enters junior high, he has fewer foreseeing dreams and they also become weaker. However, one night when he is in junior high, he has the strongest foreseeing dream he has ever had. This dream reveals that he will someday realize he is gay, since he is having sex with a man in his dream. From that day forth, Tamura is determined to assert his heterosexuality, even going as far as reading porn while in class. He continues this behavior even as he enters high school.

One day Tamura passes out after seeing fellow student Narumi Seiwa in class. It is revealed that Seiwa is the man he is always having sex with in his foreseeing dream. Later when Seiwa meets him out of dumb curiosity (wondering how someone can pass out from just seeing someone else) Tamura tries to avoid Seiwa. Seiwa in turn follows Tamura around, wondering why the other boy seems to dislike him for no apparent reason and demanding an explanation.

This series was first serialized in the Japanese manga magazine Dear+ in 2002. It has been licensed by Taifu Comics.

== Plot ==
Koi wa Ina Mono Myōna Mono actually starts while Tamura is in high school, when he encounters another boy, Narumi Seiwa, who he immediately recognizes from his foreseeing dream. He promptly passes out after seeing Seiwa from the stress of meeting the guy he knows he will end up sleeping with, which will confirm that he is a homosexual.

Tamura attempts to avoid Seiwa at all costs, since he is already strongly attracted to him against his will because of the numerous times he has had the foreseeing dream of sleeping with Seiwa. Seiwa's touch is enough for Tamura to get aroused. Seiwa is further confused from Tamura's reactions and adverse avoidance of him.

Tamura's avoidance of Seiwa irritates the other boy, who wants to know why he seemingly hates him. The result is that Seiwa follows Tamura around school wanting an explanation, making it hard for Tamura to control his feelings for Seiwa.

Eventually after such a long time of trying to avoid his "fate" and Seiwa's growing affection for him, Tamura finally gives up and sleeps with Seiwa after only knowing him for a few weeks, because of the stress it has caused him from his own stubbornness, and Seiwa's inability to give up liking him. However, the real reason he sleeps with Seiwa is because he finally admits that he does love Seiwa. The two become lovers and life partners afterwards.

When last seen, Tamura and Seiwa are an "idiot couple" who still act like newlyweds, even seven years later.

== Characters ==
Masafumi Tamura
The main character, Masafumi Tamura, has foreseeing dreams that tell the future and always come true. He has had these dreams since he was a young child. His most disturbing dream however was the one about himself, and his realization that he will discover he is gay.
The first night he has the dream, he is determined to assert his heterosexuality. Unfortunately, he keeps having the dream over and over again throughout junior high and into high school. Since Tamura avoids sleeping as much as possible, he spends the time he is awake studying, and is now a top student. This changed Tamura from an expressive kid with average grades and a really friendly demeanor, to a top-of-the-class student who took on extra responsibilities. He is polite but very stoic and a little awkward to approach. He has been labeled as being a real "goody goody" kid.
Tamura is a polite young man to everyone and he has no real enemies. He is usually well liked by others and likes taking care of people. He is even liked by his senpai (upperclassmen). He tries to act like he's in control by forcing himself to stay calm and trying to find any plausible way out of situations he doesn't like. When he is bothered by something, he tends to freak out or becomes extremely quiet and stammeringly shy. Tamura is also very stubborn, seen by how he absolutely denies having any inclinations of being gay.
To reassert his heterosexuality, Tamura went as far as reading porn right in the middle of class or out in public, which ended up earning him a bizarre sort of respect from the other boys in his class for his bold actions (at first no one outside Tamura's family know about his foreseeing ability, so the boys in his class don't know the real reason why he's reading porn in class).
Tamura lives with his father, mother, and older sister at the beginning of the story. They know about Tamura's foreseeing dreams and have already accepted that Tamura will be gay a long time ago, even if Tamura hasn't. This aggravates Tamura that none of his family is freaking out about him becoming gay, which ends up making him think of them as the "brainless family". By the time Tamura is 23, he is an important computer programmer at a company called IT Company.
Narumi Seiwa
Narumi Seiwa is a very normal high schooler, if a bit dense. He has a puppy-like persona, which occasionally is shown in a comical fashion with Seiwa sprouting dog-ears, a tail, and a begging look on his face. He often admits himself that he is very naive and a little dense, which is confirmed when he says stupid things and asks really dumb questions (Tamura even thinks of him as the "naive idiot" at one point). He's a nice boy, very expressive, friendly, and will boldly announce what he's upset about. He has a very straightforward personality and demands the reason for Tamura's apparent avoidance of him.
When Seiwa meets Tamura again (after Tamura fainted the day before), Seiwa wanted to find Tamura because he was so amazed someone could faint just by seeing someone else. Seiwa has a growing curiosity about what kind of person Tamura is which ends up with him following Tamura around and asking Tamura's friends about him.
Seiwa sees the dream as a lucky blessing that will put him together with Tamura who he has begun to really like. This stresses out Tamura even more that he isn't actual upset like he thinks he should be. Seiwa is just a little too enthusiastic about going out with Tamura, especially on the physical level. Tamura has to ward him off constantly, especially when he finds out that Seiwa is inexperienced and doesn't know how to sleep with a man, which brings more problems.
At the beginning of the story, Seiwa lives with his mother (twice divorced), an older sister, Nagisa, and a younger sister, Mio. Tamura doesn't meet Seiwa's family until seven years in their relationship when both of them are 23 and already living together. Seiwa has been avoiding letting Tamura meet his family, not because he's afraid or even worried about revealing his sexuality to his family, but because he knows Tamura is a good catch and that his mother and sisters are huge flirts. Seiwa often doesn't feel like he deserves such a great guy like Tamura since he considers himself pretty stupid at times, and his family tends to agree with him. By this time in the story, Seiwa is employed in restaurant services and is a chef apprentice.
Houjyou
Known only as Houjyou, Houjyou is one of two friends of Tamura that he talks to about his problem with Seiwa. Houjyou has known Tamura since at least junior high. Houjyou is a very calm young man, who gives good and reasonable advice, but also some that is very harsh. He hardly ever reacts to anything in any extreme, and doesn't care if Tamura is gay (saying that it's his romance, his problem) and will still be his friend. When Tamura and Seiwa finally become lovers, he thoroughly tells them that the world can be a harsh place for a gay couple.
Houjyou serves as half of the voice of reason for both Tamura and Seiwa, the other half being Ota. He and Ota talk and give common sense advice to both Tamura and Seiwa as their situation complicates.
Houjyou also speculates the reason why Tamura keeps having the same dream is because he is too stubborn to accept it, so unless he sleeps with Seiwa, he'll keep having the dream. He even tells Seiwa to sleep with Tamura as soon as possible, obviously saying that they're being stupid and they shouldn't be making the situation into such a big deal. After many failed attempts for the Tamura and Seiwa to get together, he starts to get aggravated with their lack of progress, but continues to give them advice. He even declares he'll call them the "idiot couple" if they finally hook up.
Both he and Ota give money to Tamura and Seiwa to go to a love hotel as their relationship begins to escalate and really drive Tamura crazy with frustration. The idea for them to go to a love hotel was Houjyou's who thinks they just need to sleep together so Tamura will finally quit fussing over his situation (Tamura by this time is becoming increasingly lethargic and stressed).
Ota
Simply known as Ota, Ota is one of Tamura's friends who has known him since at least junior high. Ota is one of Tamura's friends that Seiwa converses with to try to find out why Tamura is avoiding him. Ota is usually calm, even with the situation Tamura is in with Seiwa, but sometimes overreacts, especially after he notices the apparent changes between Tamura and Seiwa's behavior after their first night together. However, one of the things he doesn't overreact to is finding out Tamura had foreseeing dreams about finding out he's gay.
Ota serves as half of the voice of reason for both Tamura and Seiwa, the other half being Houjyou. He and Houjyou talk and give common sense advice to both Tamura and Seiwa as their situation complicates. He's more sympathetic than Houjyou and tries to help and support Tamura and Seiwa's decisions.
