= Living for Tomorrow =

Japanese manga series

たちは明日に向かって生きるのだ (Bokutachi wa Asu ni Mukatte Ikiru no da)
- Genre: Yaoi
- Manga
- Written by: Taishi Zaō
- English publisher: NA: Digital Manga Publishing
- Magazine: Dear+
- Published: January 31, 2005
- Volumes: 1

Living for Tomorrow (僕たちは明日に向かって生きるのだ, Bokutachi wa Asu ni Mukatte Ikiru no da) is a Japanese manga written and illustrated by Taishi Zaō, (a boys love and girls love pen-name for Mikiyo Tsuda). It is licensed in North America by Digital Manga Publishing, which released the manga on May 20, 2009. It is licensed in Germany by Egmont Manga, which anticipates its release in May 2010. It is licensed in France by Taifu Comics. It is about a boy who discovers that his late mother could make others lucky, and he wonders if he inherited her gift. To find out, he confesses his feelings to his friend, as he hopes that by dating his friend, he can make him lucky.

== Reception ==
Leroy Douresseaux, writing for Comic Book Bin, found the story to be "not particularly noteworthy", but enjoyed Zaou's art, especially on characters' faces, ultimately deciding that the art lifted the manga as a whole from being "average". Courtney Kraft, writing for Graphic Novel Reporter, felt that the manga never became "gratuitous and trashy", enjoying the themes of "friendship, trust, and the female fantasy of young men opening up to each other". However, Kraft felt that this fantasy meant that the dialogue between the characters was unrealistically "clean" and the characters were "too understanding and mature" to be in their early high school years. Michelle Smith, writing for PopCultureShock, had been unimpressed with Mikiyo Tsuda's shōjo works, but felt that Zaou's sense of humour was better suited to yaoi.
