= Hinako Takanaga =

Japanese manga artist

- Born: Aichi, Japan
- Occupation: Manga artist
- Known for: Yaoi romantic comedies
- Website: anaguranz.blog95.fc2.com

Hinako Takanaga (高永 ひなこ, Takanaga Hinako; born September 16) is a Japanese yaoi manga artist from Nagoya. She has also provided illustrations for several yaoi light novels by other authors, including The Guilty by Katsura Izumi. Most of her works have been translated into English and German (chiefly by Tokyopop imprints). Her influences include Suzue Miuchi, Yun Kōga and Range Murata.

== Biography ==
Hinako Takanaga was born on September 16 in Nagoya, Aichi, Japan. Her first manga story, Goukaku kigan (合格祈願; Prayers for a passing grade), was published by Hanamaru Comics in 1995. As the story continued it was later retitled Challengers, and it spawned a spinoff series titled The Tyrant Falls in Love. She currently lives in Osaka.

She was a guest at Yaoi-Con in 2007 and 2010, invited by Digital Manga Publishing, the US publishers of her popular series Little Butterfly and The Tyrant Falls in Love.

== Bibliography ==
=== Manga ===
- Challengers (チャレンジャーズ), 1995, 4 volumes
- Benkyou Shinasai! Study Hard! (勉強しなさい!Study Hard!; Please Study! Study Hard!), 1999, 1 volume (This work has an English subtitle; as of September 2011 it is not licensed in English.)
- Little Butterfly (リトル・バタフライ), 2001, 3 volumes
- Love Round!!, 2002, 1 volume
- Liberty Liberty! (リバティ・リバティ！), 2003, 1 volume
- Croquis (クロッキー), 2004, 1 volume
- Dekiru Otoko ga Suki Nanda! (デキる男が好きなんだ!; I Like Impressive Guys!), 2004, 1 volume; English title A Capable Man
- Awkward Silence (不器用なサイレント, Bukiyou na Silent), 2004, 6 volumes (completed)
- The Tyrant Falls in Love (恋する暴君, Koisuru Boukun), 2004, 14+ volumes (ongoing)
- Turning Point (ターニングポイント), 2005, 1 volume
- You Will Fall in Love (きみが恋に堕ちる, Kimi ga Koi ni Ochiru), 2005, 1 volume
- You Will Drown in Love (きみが恋に溺れる, Kimi ga Koi ni Oboreru), 2006, 3 volumes
- The Devil's Secret (アクマのひみつ, Akuma no Himitsu), 2007, 1 volume
- Kimi ga Koi ni Midareru (きみが恋に乱れる; You Will Be Thrown Into Chaos by Love), 2011 (completed)

=== Illustrations ===
- The Guilty Series, by Katsura Izumi (和泉桂)

- Yuuzai (有罪; Guilt), English title The Guilty Vol. 1: Verdict, 2002
- Genzai (原罪; Original Sin), English title The Guilty Vol. 2: Original Sin, 2002
- Shokuzai (贖罪; Atonement), English title The Guilty Vol. 3: Redemption, 2003
- Dazai (堕罪; Sinking into Sin), English title The Guilty Vol. 4: Forsaken, 2004

- Shirasagi Series, by Haruhi Sakiya (崎谷はるひ)

- Kiss wa daiji ni sarigenaku (キスは大事にさりげなく), 2005
- Yume wa kirei ni shidokenaku (夢はきれいにしどけなく), 2005
- Koi wa jouzu ni adokenaku (恋は上手にあどけなく), 2006
- Heiousen no moritoriamu (平行線上のモラトリアム), 2007
- Suichokusen no stoishizumu (垂直線上のストイシズム), 2007
- Mitsu wa yoru yori kagirinaku (蜜は夜よりかぎりなく), 2008

- Shinkan Series, by Tamaki Yoshida (吉田珠姫)

- Shinkan wa ou ni aisareru (神官は王に愛される; The priest is loved by the king), 2005
- Shinkan wa ou o kuruwaseru (神官は王を狂わせる; The priest drives the king crazy), 2007
- Shinkan wa ou o koishitau (神官は王を恋い慕う; The priest loves the king), 2007
- Shinkan wa ou o nayamaseru (神官は王を悩ませる; The priest annoys the king), 2010

- Sakihokoru mitsugetsu (咲きほこる蜜月), by Runoa Mafune (真船るのあ), 2008
