= A Capable Man =

Japanese manga

- Cover of Blu's English translation

デキる男が好きなんだ! (Dekiru Otoko ga Suki Nanda!)
- Genre: Yaoi
- Manga
- Written by: Hinako Takanaga
- Published by: Kadokawa Shoten
- English publisher: NA: Blu
- Published: January 29, 2004
- Volumes: 1

A Capable Man (デキる男が好きなんだ!, Dekiru Otoko ga Suki Nanda!; lit. 'I Like Impressive Guys!') is a one-shot Japanese manga written and illustrated by Hinako Takanaga.

== Plot ==
Shingo has always liked guys who are exceptional. His best friend, Koji, is the smartest, fastest, and hottest guy in school. But what Shingo doesn't know is that Koji has worked tirelessly to become so exceptional—and he's been doing it all to impress Shingo, because he's secretly in love with him. But everything is about to be revealed. When Shingo's equally impressive cousin comes to town, Koji realizes he'll have to confess his feelings or risk losing the one person he's in love with.

== Publication ==
Kadokawa Shoten released the manga on January 29, 2004. In North America, the manga was licensed by Tokyopop's BLU imprint under the title A Capable Man, with the English edition released on November 4, 2008. In Germany, the manga was licensed by Tokyopop Germany under the title Traumboyz, which was released in March 2007.

== Reception ==
Mania.com's Danielle van Gorder commends the manga for its "nicely distinct" character designs but criticises it for "the reproduction [which] looks slightly muddy, and the screentone replication isn't the greatest". Pop Shock Culture's Isaac Hale commends the manga for its "adorable humor [which] is abundant in every story". Comic Book Bin's Leroy Douresseaux comments on Hinako Takanaga's use of "a variety of moods, techniques, and styles to give her stories a variety of temperatures – from hot and sexy to adorable and funny".
