= Brilliant Blue (manga) =

Japanese manga series

ブリリアント☆BLUE (Buririanto Blue)
- Genre: Yaoi
- Manga
- Written by: Saemi Yorita
- Published by: Shinshokan
- English publisher: NA: Digital Manga Publishing
- Imprint: Dear Comics
- Magazine: Dear+
- Original run: June 30, 2004 – July 30, 2005
- Volumes: 2

Brilliant Blue (ブリリアント☆BLUE, Buririanto Blue) is a Japanese manga series written and illustrated by Saemi Yorita. It is licensed in North America by Digital Manga Publishing, which released the first volume of the manga through its DokiDoki imprint, on 6 May 2009. The second volume was released on 19 August 2009. Yorita considers Nanami to be a "stupid bottom" character.

== Reception ==
Michelle Smith, writing for PopCultureShock, found the first volume "utterly charming" – appreciating Shouzo not abusing the "imbalance of power" in his relationship with the "child-like" Nanami, and for encouraging Nanami to become more adult while still respecting his talents. Leroy Douresseaux, writing for Comic Book Bin, feels that Brilliant Blue is a "compelling drama" and "also an interesting workplace romance", because Shouzo and Nanami connect over workplace issues.

Michelle Smith, writing for PopCultureShock, found Shouzo's unexplained escalation of the relationship dissatisfying, Smith also found his impatience to make the relationship a sexual relationship "off-putting" and out of character, given Shouzo's patience in the first volume. In an epilogue six months later, the couple are out, but Smith feels the prejudices against them were glossed over in the end. Leroy Douressaux, writing for Comic Book Bin, felt that the storytelling became "awkward" once Shouzo and Nanami began their romantic relationship, but when the author pulled away from the couple to show more of their surroundings, the storytelling became better. Douressaux found the "small-town" feel of Brilliant Blue to be refreshing, as he felt the story was "as much about small-town commitments and friendships as it is about romance".
