= Electric Hands =

Japanese manga

- Genre: Yaoi
- Manga
- Written by: Taishi Zaō
- Published by: Shinshokan
- English publisher: NA: Digital Manga Publishing
- Magazine: Dear+
- Published: October 1998
- Volumes: 1

Electric Hands is a Japanese manga written and illustrated by Taishi Zaou, (a boys love and girls love pen-name for Mikiyo Tsuda). It is licensed in French by Asuka, which released the manga in January 2009. It is licensed in North America by Digital Manga Publishing, which released the manga on November 18, 2009. It is licensed in Germany by Egmont Manga.

== Reception ==
Faustine Lillaz, writing for Planete BD, felt that each of the stories in the anthology was pleasant to read, despite the overall quality of the book being 'average'. NiDNiM disliked the lack of background art in the volume. Connie C., writing for PopCultureShock, felt that the stories were about niche topics, and that the stories were "basic yaoi situations" with "one-dimensional characters". She felt that Zaou's author commentary redeemed the manga somewhat. Leroy Douresseaux felt that although "the shockingly aggressive nature and sexual forwardness of the preteens" may have come off as disturbing in another story, that Zaou's comedy and art lead to the overall impression being of a "frothy confection". Patricia Beard found Electric Hands's major draw to be "a theme in transition and the reflections of the creator on it".
