= Color (manga) =

Japanese manga anthology

- Cover of Color as published by Shinshokan.
- Genre: Yaoi
- Manga
- Written by: Eiki Eiki; Taishi Zaō
- Published by: Shinshokan
- English publisher: NA: Digital Manga Publishing
- Magazine: Dear+
- Published: 1999
- Volumes: 1

Color is a Japanese manga anthology written and illustrated by Taishi Zaou and Eiki Eiki. Color was serialized in Dear+, a magazine known for its romantic and non-explicit boys love manga published by Shinshokan, and a tankōbon collecting the chapters released in February 1999. Color is licensed in North America by Digital Manga Publishing which released the manga in June 2009. It is licensed in France by Asuka and in Germany by Egmont Manga.

== Reception ==
Courtney Kraft, writing for Graphic Novel Reporter, felt Color was a "rather endearing piece about two boys who develop genuine love that leads to physical attraction", which she felt was the opposite to how relationships are usually depicted in yaoi. Holly Ellingwood, writing for Active Anime, enjoyed the parallels between the two characters' meeting and friendship, and the artists' meeting and friendship. Danielle Leigh, writing for Comic Book Resources, noted that the characters' relationship was "based on equal parts affection, respect and interests", which she felt was lacking in other yaoi. Connie C., writing for Pop Culture Shock, felt that although each chapter of the manga was good, that they did not connect enough to each other, leaving the story feeling disjointed. Namtrac, writing in Homosexualité et manga: le yaoi, felt Color was only of interest for those new to boys love, due to its "light" and "gentle" story, "all but memorable" characters, "comedy that doesn't hit the mark" and "lukewarm sex scenes". Namtrac felt the "most interesting" part in Color was the bonuses. Faustine Lillaz, writing for PlaneteBD, described Color as "nice but the quality is still average", but enjoyed the growth of the "rapport" between the characters, which felt unforced to Lillaz, and how acutely and subtlety the emotions are depicted. However she wrote that sometimes the plot felt rushed due to the one-volume space of the work. NiDNiM, writing for Manga-News, felt the story was "well-constructed despite its lightness", and wanted to know more about the characters, expressing frustration over the one-volume space of the manga.
