= The Guilty (novel series) =

Japanese light novel series

有罪 (Yūzai)
- Genre: Yaoi
- Light novel
- Written by: Katsura Izumi
- Illustrated by: Hinako Takanaga
- Published by: Movic, Frontier Works
- English publisher: NA: Digital Manga Publishing
- Original run: January 2002 – October 2004
- Volumes: 4

The Guilty (Japanese: 有罪, Hepburn: Yūzai) is a Japanese yaoi light novel series written by Katsura Izumi and illustrated by Hinako Takanaga. It is licensed in North America by Digital Manga Publishing, which released all 4 books of the series through its yaoi imprint, Juné, between October 21, 2008, and July 8, 2009.

== Novels ==
The first two novels were published by Movic before the title was transferred to Frontier Works. The books were re-released in 2005.

No.	Title	Original release date	North American release date
01	The Guilty Vol. 1: Verdict; Yuuzai (有罪)	January 2002 (Movic); May 2005 (Frontier Works); 978-4896015591 (Movic); ISBN 978-4-86134-075-8 (Frontier Works)	October 21, 2008; 978-1-56970-614-5
Toya Sakurai has always wanted to get his hands on Kai Hodaka's books before anyone else, so when he is assigned to be the bestselling author's editor, it seems like a dream come true. Kai Hodaka, with a slick face and a sinful voice, is the subject of numerous rumors and gossip, but Toya is more intrigued by the glimpses he sees of the real man behind the stories: quiet, insightful, and with a hidden kindness to him. So when Hodaka makes a shocking proposal, Toya almost can't believe it: Toya's body, in exchange for Hodaka's manuscript. Enigmatic author...morally bankrupt celebrity...which is the real Kai Hodaka, and will Toya find out before he loses himself entirely?
02	The Guilty Vol. 2: Original Sin; Genzai (原罪)	September 2002 (Movic); August 2005 (frontier works); 978-4896016062 (Movic); ISBN 978-4-86134-092-5 (frontier works)	Jan 29, 2009; 978-1-56970-613-8
Toya Sakurai is swimming in success after his work with the bestselling author Kai Hodaka, who is also Toya's secret lover. But with expectations so high, his company soon gives him a new project: find a fresh and exciting new author to work for Sozan Publishing. When Toya finds the young author, Yo Amano, he discovers that the traits his lover Hodaka lacks, Amano has, and Amano is sensitive and caring to Toya's feelings. Emotions will run high in this second volume of The Guilty series.
03	The Guilty Vol. 3: Redemption; Shokuzai (贖罪)	November 2003; November 2005 (re-release); 978-4861340055; ISBN 978-4-86134-102-1 (re-release)	Apr 8, 2009; 978-1-56970-612-1
Editor Toya Sakurai is the talk of the industry for his amazing work with best-selling mystery writer Kai Hodaka. But most people don't know that the root of Toya's success is his secret relationship with Hodaka. However, Toya's success leads to jealousy from his coworkers, and that jealousy fuels some hateful gossip. All of this compounds when rumors fly around the internet about Hodaka having a relationship with one of his male editors. When Toya tries to distance himself from Hodaka to abate the rumors, everything gets worse, until finally, Hodaka asks for a new editor! Can these two guilty hearts find happiness together?
04	The Guilty Vol. 4: Forsaken; Dazai (堕罪)	October 2004; August 2006 (re-release); 978-4861340420; ISBN 978-4-86134-147-2 (re-release)	Jul 8, 2009; 978-1-56970-618-3
Toya Sakurai is starting fresh in a new apartment, now enticingly closer to his lover, Kai Hodaka. When he invites his lover to come visit, he realizes the benefits of living so much closer. But when Toya's publishing company decides to put out a fan book on Kai Hodaka, Toya is shocked to learn just how little he knows about his lover after two years! Also includes a collection of short stories with deeper insight on our favorite guilty pair! Toya spends a love burning weekend with Hodaka in Hayama after the tortuously written Emergence. Then, six months into their riotous relationship, Hodaka shows just what he's willing to do to make Toya happy. The loving, dangerous, guilty love they share comes to a climax in this final volume.

== Reception ==
Melinda Beasi of Pop Culture Shock commends the series for "some nice characterization and real emotional depth" but criticizes it for "uncomfortably humiliating sex scenes or homophobic self-loathing of the series' protagonist". ActiveAnime's Rachel Bentham describes the series as "torrid and wantonly graphic and at the same time manages to throw in some romantic angles" and praises the "gorgeous artwork".
