= Liberty Liberty! =

Japanese manga

- Japanese cover

リバティ☆リバティ! (Ribatei Ribatei!)
- Genre: Yaoi, Romance
- Manga
- Written by: Hinako Takanaga
- Published by: Gentosha
- English publisher: NA: Blu Manga
- Magazine: Comic Birz
- Published: May 24, 2005
- Volumes: 1

Liberty Liberty! (Japanese: リバティ☆リバティ!, Hepburn: Ribatei Ribatei!) is a Japanese manga written and illustrated by Hinako Takanaga. It was first serialized by Gentosha in Comic Birz. Later, it was licensed in North America by Blu Manga, an imprint of Tokyopop, in Germany by Tokyopop Germany, and in Poland by Studio JG.

== Plot ==
College student Itaru Yaichi is found drunk and lying on a pile of garbage by Kōki Kuwabara, a cameraman who works for a small local cable station. Accidentally, Itaru ends up breaking Kuwabara's camera during a fight, after he thought Kuwabara had insulted him. The next day, Itaru wakes up in the Kuwabara's apartment and learns that Kuwabara saved his life. However, Kuwabara demands the money from the broken camera: ¥200,000 (around US$1,700), but Itaru doesn't have any money. Kuwabara allows Itaru to stay in his apartment until he gets a job and pays his debt.

== Reception ==
Leroy Douresseaux enjoyed the character development over the volume, and the delayed gratification of the couple getting together. Matthew Warner enjoyed the "balance between romance and comedy" in the volume, and felt that the tameness of the manga made it a suitable entry point to the boys love genre. Jennifer Dunbar enjoyed the "steady, energetic art" and the character development of the side cast.
