= Family Complex =

Manga by Mikiyo Tsuda

- Cover of the first manga volume.

ファミリー・コンプレックス (Famirī Konpurekkusu)
- Genre: Comedy
- Manga
- Written by: Mikiyo Tsuda
- Published by: Shinshokan
- English publisher: NA: Digital Manga Publishing
- Magazine: South
- Original run: 1999 – 2000
- Volumes: 1

Family Complex (Japanese: ファミリー・コンプレックス, Hepburn: Famirī Konpurekkusu) is a Japanese manga written and illustrated by Mikiyo Tsuda. Family Complex was first serialized in the manga magazine South (a special issue of Wings) published by Shinshokan, with the only bound volume released in May 2000. Although the manga avoids openly image of any LGBT-themed content, it is also known because of the easy parody of yaoi and yuri fanservice.

== Plot ==
The story centers around Akira Sakamoto, who is a part of a very unusual family. Everyone in his family is incredibly beautiful, except him. Compared to the rest of his family, Akira is often overshadowed and feels left out of the rest of the family when they go out in public. Despite this, his family has never tried to distance themselves from him and they treat each other the same way. Akira and his entire family also appear in the series Princess Princess by the same author of Family Complex.

== Characters ==
Akira Sakamoto (坂本秋良, Sakamoto Akira)

The main character and the narrator of the story who's 14 years old and a junior at Fujimori Junior High School. He feels that he is the only normal person in his whole family of beauties. He is a supporting character in Princess Princess, another one of Tsuda's works.

Harumi Sakamoto (坂本春海, Sakamoto Harumi)

The eldest brother of the family at 17 years old. He's called "Sakamoto-sama" by his peers at school and could easily be a model. He experiences problems with girls because of his feminine beauty, he enjoys great popularity with most male classmates, many of whom are openly in love with him.

Natsuru Sakamoto (坂本夏流, Sakamoto Natsuru)

She is the eldest sister of the family at 16 years old. She is often mistaken for a boy because of her looks. She is also very popular with people of the same gender, like her older brother and later younger sister, but she is portrayed as the only member of the family who enjoys it.

Fuyuki Sakamoto (坂本冬姫, Sakamoto Fuyuki)

The youngest sister of the family at 10 years old. She is usually rather quiet. She has been compared to a doll various times. At the end of the manga, she changes her appearance and manner of behavior to communicate more smoothly, which makes her more handsome and caring like her older sister.

Hidetoshi Sakamoto (坂本英季, Sakamoto Hidetoshi)

The father of the family looks about as old to be Akira's brother despite him really being 41 as well. He works as a technician.

Nanami Sakamoto (坂本七美, Sakamoto Nanami)

The mother of the family who, much like her husband, looks incredibly young for her actual age of 41. She looks very innocent. In Princess Princess, when Kouno and Shihoudani first meet her, they think she is Akira's sister and wonder if she is older or younger than he is. After being told she is his mother, they ask if she is his stepmother but Akira not only confirms she is his real mother but also that she never had any surgery or other procedure to look too young for that.
