= Mikiyo Tsuda =

Japanese manga artist

Mikiyo Tsuda (つだ みきよ, Tsuda Mikiyo; born on January 10) is the pen name of Mikiyo Tsuda (津田 美貴代), a Japanese manga artist active since 1998. Under the name Taishi Zaō (蔵王大志, Zaō Taishi), she writes boys love and girls love manga while under Mikiyo Tsuda she writes comedy-shōjo manga.

== Biography ==
Tsuda is from Fukui Prefecture.

Her reasons for using more than one pen name was to keep the fact that she drew manga centered on homosexual relationships from her family, though they eventually found out anyway. Many manga artists often adopt artistic personas for themselves in order to represent themselves in sections of their manga not attributed to the story, as in an author's note section. Mikiyo Tsuda's persona is that of a teddy bear wearing a red bow tie with a bell at its center.

One of her friends, and also a fellow manga artist, is Eiki Eiki. They often co-author manga together, display their art together, and have autograph sessions together. Eiki Eiki has sometimes acted as Taishi Zaō's manager.

== Works ==
=== Written as Mikiyo Tsuda ===
- The Day of Revolution (1999)
- Family Complex (2000)
- Princess Princess (2002)
  - Princess Princess + (2006)
- Atsumare! Gakuen Tengoku (2008)

=== Written as Taishi Zaō ===
- Electric Hands (1998)
- Koi wa Ina Mono Myōna Mono (2002)
- Bokutachi wa Asu ni Mukatte Ikiru no da (2005)
- Aruji no Ōse no Mama ni (2005)
- Brothers Battle
- Her - included in Haru Natsu Aki Fuyu

==== Co-authored with Eiki Eiki ====
- Color (1999)
- Haru Natsu Aki Fuyu (2007) - a collection of stories that were serialized in Yuri Hime, such as She-Wolf and First Kiss.
- Love DNA Double X (2009)
- Love Stage!! (2010)
- Back Stage!! (2010)
