= The Tyrant Falls in Love =

Japanese manga and anime series

- Juné's cover for Vol 1 of the US license

恋する暴君 (Koisuru Bōkun)
- Genre: Yaoi, Comedy, Drama, Slice of Life
- Manga
- Written by: Hinako Takanaga
- Published by: Kaiōsha
- English publisher: NA: Juné
- Magazine: Gush
- Original run: February 2004 – present
- Volumes: 15
- Original video animation
- Directed by: Keiji Kawakubo
- Produced by: Yūki Morishita
- Written by: Yukina Hiiro
- Studio: Prime Time
- Released: June 25, 2010 – November 26, 2010
- Runtime: 30 minutes
- Episodes: 2
- Audio drama
- Studio: Inter Communications, Movic
- Original run: August 20, 2005 – September 29, 2017
- Episodes: 8

The Tyrant Falls in Love (Japanese: 恋する暴君, Hepburn: Koisuru Bōkun) is a Japanese yaoi manga series written and illustrated by Hinako Takanaga. The Tyrant Falls in Love is a sequel to Takanaga's series Challengers. The series has appeared on manga best-seller lists both in Japan and in Germany, and the long-delayed US release has been labeled "one of the most highly-anticipated Yaoi releases ever". The series is licensed in English by Juné. It is also licensed in German by Tokyopop Germany with the title Verliebter Tyrann, in Polish by Kotori with the title Zakochany Tyran, and in French by Taifu Comics with the title The Tyrant Who Fall in Love.

In 2010, the first volume was adapted into a two-part Original video animation (OVA) by Primetime.

== Plot ==
The story picks up on Morinaga and Souichi's story where Challengers left off.

At the start of The Tyrant Falls in Love, in 2004, a year following the events of Challengers, Tomoe and Kurokawa recently moved to California for Tomoe's new job when Souichi heard that California has just legalized gay marriage. Souichi furiously calls Tomoe to tell him that he should not get any ideas about getting married, but Tomoe has not heard the news since he has been busy working. In effect, Souichi's call does the exact opposite of what he wants, and Kurokawa and Tomoe run off to get married. Meanwhile, Morinaga laments to a friend about his unrequited love for Souichi, who in turn gives Morinaga a special drug that will make Souichi more compliant. Morinaga tries to throw it in the trash on his way home but feels curious about it since Hiroto said it was so good so reluctantly takes it home and hides it in his cupboard. The next day, Souichi runs around yelling that he's going to go to America and get a green card so he can become the governor of California to re-ban gay marriage. Morinaga convinces him to calm down and drink with him instead, so he goes to Morinaga's apartment to drown his sorrows.

After Souichi drinks all the alcohol they have bought, he demands that Morinaga go out to buy more. While Morinaga is out, Souichi searches his apartment for any alcohol he may have, finds the hidden drug-filled bottle, and drinks it, not knowing what it is. At first, it appears that it has no effect, and Morinaga believes his friend tricked him. They go to sleep, but Souichi wakes up at night to find himself aroused and unable to move his body properly. He tries to sneak off to relieve himself, but due to the effects of the drug, his weakened body trips and wakes up Morinaga. Morinaga sees that Souichi is aroused and understands that the drug Souichi has taken works. Thinking that Souichi would never return his feelings, Morinaga takes advantage of the situation. Despite Souichi's weak refusals, telling Morinaga to stop, he continues anyway.

The next morning, Morinaga is troubled by not being able to control himself and what he did to Souichi. Souichi is furious with Morinaga for betraying his trust and threatens him, but Morinaga also tells him that he has been insensitive. He reminds Souichi that he was aware of his feelings for him but became careless around him. Souichi then throws Morinaga out of his apartment, who then goes to the university in shame. When he returns home, Morinaga calls Souichi to apologize and makes plans to avoid seeing him. At first, Souichi thinks nothing of it, but Morinaga completely vanishes and his classmates and friends begin to ask Souichi if he knows where Morinaga has gone. Souichi is shocked, having thought that Morinaga had simply been avoiding him. After not being able to contact Morinaga, Souichi begins to grow extremely worried and anxious that Morinaga may have been hurt himself, getting his family contact info searching for him, and going to his apartment every day to see if he has come home. During this time, he realizes that despite everything that happened, he is willing to forgive and forget the entire event between the two. He then realizes how desperately he wants Morinaga to come back home, saying the loss he feels is the worst one he has ever felt.

Morinaga eventually returns to his apartment to pack up his belongings so he can move away when Souichi finally finds him. Souichi lets it slip how frantically worried he was when he vanished, and Morinaga is deeply touched. Souichi tells him never to go away again, and Morinaga tells him that if he is to stay, they will have to have sex since his feelings have not changed. Souichi, not wanting Morinaga to leave, reluctantly succumbs to the sexual advances and allows Morinaga to have sex with him. The two commence a relationship which develops over the series.

== Characters ==
- Souichi Tatsumi – A first-year doctorate student in the agricultural science department at a university in Nagoya. Extremely hot-headed and violent, he has a reputation of being a tyrant to other students at the university and is not very social in result. After almost being raped by a gay professor and other bad experiences with homosexual men, he becomes extremely homophobic. Despite this, he unconsciously becomes deeply emotionally attached to his research assistant and friend, Morinaga, whom he is aware is homosexual but allows by his side on the agreement that his sexual orientation not be an issue. He tries to rationalize his dependency on Morinaga by convincing himself that having sex with him from time to time is essential to keep him in his life, although refusing to admit why he needs him in his life in the first place.

Voiced by: Hikaru Midorikawa

- Tetsuhiro Morinaga – A first year masters student in the agricultural science department at a university in Nagoya. He has a rough past due to growing up in a conservative family who drove him out of his hometown after discovering his relationship with a boy named Masaki, disgracing him, and leading him to a life of partying and promiscuity before changing his ways. He has been in love with Souichi since he first set eyes on him in university. While appearing happy and cheerful, Morinaga manages to enter Souichi's heart, and enters into a sexual, although very complicated, relationship with him.

Voiced by: Kousuke Toriumi

- Hiroto – Morinaga's friend who works in a gay bar called Adamsite as a bartender. He often appears at the beginning of each volume and gives Morinaga advice on his romance problems, although occasionally growing tired of hearing about his love drama.

Voiced by: Daisuke Hirakawa

- Kanako Tatsumi – Souichi's 14-year-old sister. She mistakenly believes that Souichi and Morinaga are a couple, a belief that becomes less mistaken over time. She is shown to be a happy typical teenage girl and is supportive of her brother having a relationship with Morinaga, often teasing him about it and discussing their latest drama with Isogai.

Voiced by: Ayaka Kyo

- Taichirou Isogai – Mitsugu's friend and ex-coworker. He accidentally finds out about Souichi and Tetsuhiro's relationship when walking in on the two sharing a moment. He uses this knowledge as leverage to keep Souichi from threatening to kill Mitsugu and to treat him better.

Voiced by: Toshihiko Seki

- Tomoe Tatsumi – Souichi's younger brother and the main character of the manga Challengers. He is very smart, but ditzy and absent-minded.

Voiced by: Kouki Miyata

- Mitsugu Kurokawa – Tomoe's husband. He was one of the main characters in the manga series Challengers. He lives in constant fear of Souichi and is deathly afraid of him.

Voiced by: Tomokazu Sugita

- Kunihiro Morinaga – Tetsuhiro's older brother. He is partially the reason Tetsuhiro had left their hometown, being the one to discover his relationship with Masaki, who was also his best friend, and to reveal it their family and town. He hopes to make amends with Masaki and his brother, only to discover the amount of pain he unintentionally caused. Following this, he hopes to change his ways. He has a side story in the series, which focuses on him and Masaki re-connecting again before eventually becoming a couple themselves.

Voiced by: Ken Narita

- Junya Masaki – Tetsuhiro's first love and Kunihiro's best friend. He secretly started a relationship with Tetsuhiro in their teen years, but was actually in love with Kunihiro. Following Kunihiro finding out and harshly reprimanding them for their lifestyle, he tried to commit suicide, but the attempt failed and he soon moved away to start fresh. As seen in a side story, when he meets back up with Kunihiro, he initially takes it very badly due to still holding a grudge towards him. However, they eventually move past their emotional barriers and become a couple.
- Soujin Tatsumi – Souichi, Tomoe, and Kanako's father who often travels and has a love for bugs and nature. He is shown to be lively and loves his children dearly. When Tomoe and Mitsugu come out about their marriage to him when he comes to visit, despite being shocked, he is accepting and says all that matters is that he's truly happy.
- Yamaguchi – A friend of Morinaga who is in the same year and major as Morinaga.

== Production ==
The Tyrant Falls in Love was initially licensed in the US by DramaQueen, but had an extremely rocky road to English-language distribution. DramaQueen initially announced at Otakon 2006 but due to financial difficulties, the book was never released. In early 2008, DramaQueen announced that it was reorganizing and would bring The Tyrant Falls in Love into print imminently. However, after repeated delays and at least two official publication dates, the series remained unpublished. The series was available in scanlation, but DramaQueen issued cease and desist orders.

At the 2009 Yaoi-Con, Juné announced they had acquired the license and would be releasing volume 1 in Q3 2010.

In May 2011, Takanaga announced that she was ending the series, but would draw at least one more volume of extra stories based on the manga and a sequel series featuring Morinaga's brother Kunihiro. But in November 2012, Takanaga announced she had decided to continue the series from where it left off, although it would be at a slower pace.

== Media ==
=== Manga ===
No.	Original release date	Original ISBN	English release date	English ISBN
1	February 10, 2005	978-4-87724-398-2	August 18, 2010	978-1-56970-172-0
2	November 10, 2005	978-4-87724-430-9	December 1, 2010	978-1-56970-173-7
3	December 9, 2006	978-4-87724-483-5	April 20, 2011	978-1-56970-174-4
4	April 10, 2008	978-4-87724-844-4	August 15, 2011	978-1-56970-175-1
5	June 10, 2009	978-4-87724-129-2	December 21, 2011	978-1-56970-176-8
6	July 20, 2010	978-4-87724-197-1	April 25, 2012	978-1-56970-238-3
7	November 10, 2011	978-4-7964-0245-3	August 29, 2012	978-1-56970-265-9
8	February 10, 2012	978-4-7964-0276-7	July 31, 2013	978-1-56970-281-9
9	April 10, 2014	978-4-7964-0553-9	July 14, 2015	978-1-56970-343-4
10	April 10, 2016	978-4-7964-0852-3	June 28, 2017	978-1-56970-369-4
11	April 11, 2018	978-4-7964-1138-7	November 24, 2020	978-1-56970-383-0
12	February 10, 2020	978-4-7964-1348-0	—	—
13	November 10, 2021	978-4-7964-1482-1	—	—
14	June 9, 2023	978-4-7964-1594-1	—	—
15	October 9, 2024	978-4-7964-1693-1	—	—

=== OVA ===
In 2010 the first volume of the series was adapted into a two-part OVA by Primetime.

No.	Title	Original release date	Prod. code
1	"Koisuru Boukun Volume 1" "Koisuru Boukun 1" (恋する暴君 1)	June 25, 2010	ANDS-13005
2	"Koisuru Boukun Volume 2" "Koisuru Boukun 2" (恋する暴君 2)	November 26, 2010	ANDS-13006

=== Drama CDs ===
The BL Drama CD branch of Movic shut down in September 2012 and there are currently no plans to make more drama cds for the series.

- Koisuru Boukun (August 20, 2005) Inter Communications) INCD-2145
- Koisuru Boukun 2 (December 25, 2006) Inter Communications) INCD-2164
- Koisuru Boukun 3 (June 22, 2011) Movic MACY-2920
- Koisuru Boukun 4 (November 2, 2011) Movic MACY-2924
- Koisuru Boukun 5 (March 21, 2012) Movic
- Koisuru Boukun 6 (August 22, 2012)Movic MACY-2939
