= Daigo (musician) =

Japanese musician and actor (born 1978)

Daigo Naito
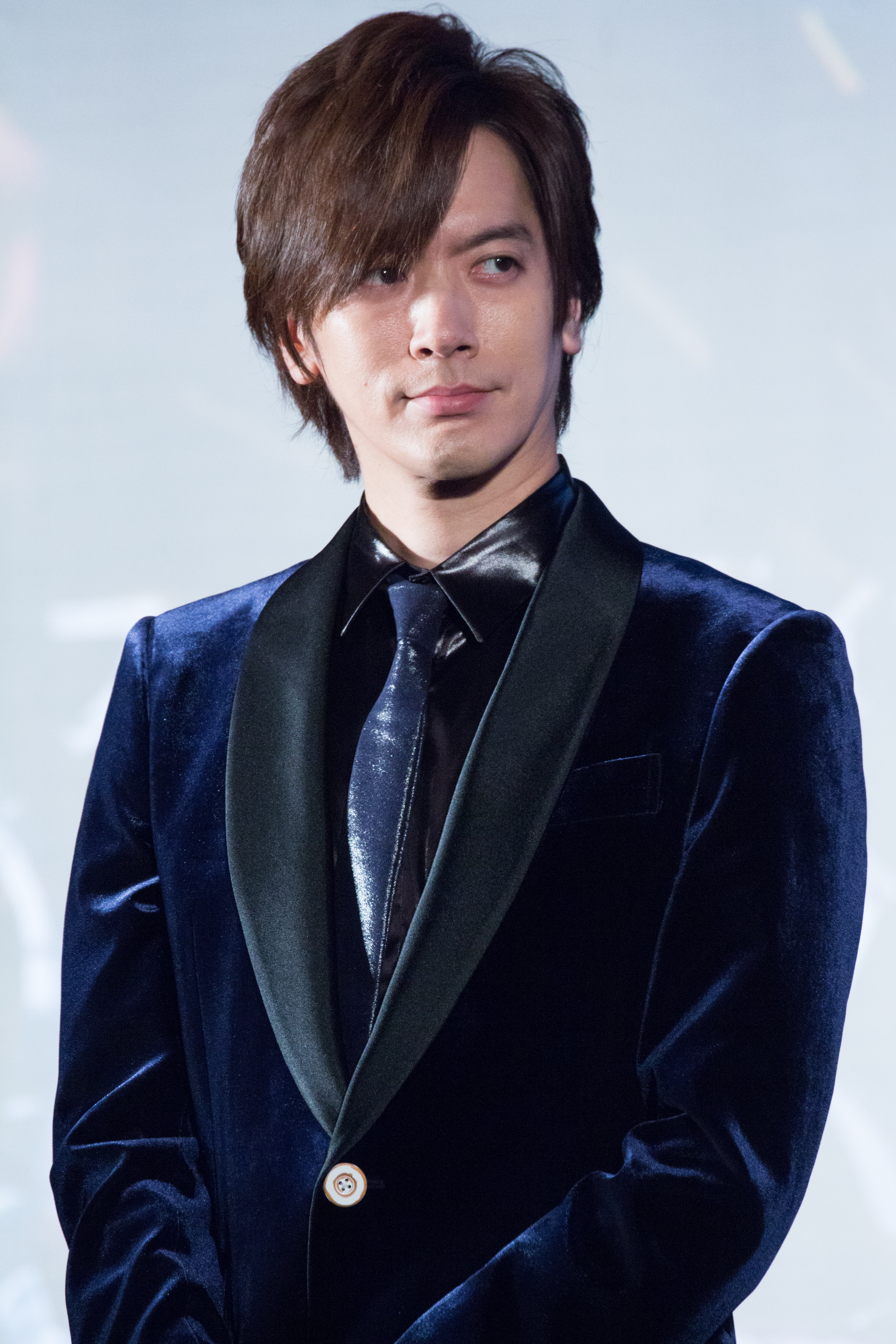
- Daigo in 2016

Background information
- Also known as: Daigo Stardust
- Born: Daigo Naito; April 8, 1978 (age 48); Nakano, Tokyo, Japan
- Genres: Rock
- Occupations: Singer-songwriter; actor; voice actor
- Years active: 1997–present
- Labels: Victor Entertainment; Zain Records
- Spouse: Keiko Kitagawa (m. 2016)
- Website: Website

Daigo Naitō (Japanese: 内藤 大湖, Hepburn: Naitō Daigo; born April 8, 1978), known mononymously as Daigo, is a Japanese singer-songwriter, actor, television personality and voice actor. He debuted in 2003 as Daigo Stardust under Victor Entertainment. In 2007, Daigo formed the visual kei rock band Breakerz. He resumed his solo project in 2013, but dropped the "Stardust" surname. Daigo is known for portraying Yukichi Oishi in the drama Love Shuffle.

== Biography ==
=== 1978–2001: early life ===
Daigo was born on April 8, 1978, in Nakano, Tokyo. He lived in Ichikawa, Chiba from the age of three until the summer of his third grade of elementary school. He moved back to Tokyo after his maternal grandfather, Noboru Takeshita, became the prime minister of Japan. His older sister is Eiko Naitō, a manga artist known as Eiki Eiki. He attended Tamagawa Gakuen. He attended Tamagawa University Department of Arts, but dropped out.

He developed a love of music at a young age when he listened to the Japanese rock band Boøwy and tried to learn the classical guitar, which he immediately quit to learn the electric guitar instead. He was also a fan of B'z, a major group under Daigo's current label. He formed a cover band for them in high school. He began voice-training during his third year in high school, and formed the band JZEIL, and performed at his high school festival before graduating. At that time, various visual bands were active, and blond hair, flashy makeup, and sexy costumes were trademarks. JZEIL grew in popularity and was expected to make a professional debut, but that did not occur and the band was dissolved on September 25, 2001.

=== 2001–2007: Daigo Stardust ===
After the band disbanded, he started his activity as a solo singer with the name "Daigo with the space toys". At age 25, with the help of photographer Katou Masonori, he made his debut on July 21, 2003, deriving the name from David Bowie's Ziggy Stardust persona.

== Family ==
Daigo married actress Keiko Kitagawa, who portrayed Sailor Mars in the live-action series Sailor Moon, on January 11, 2016. Their first daughter was born on September 7, 2020. On September 25, 2023, Daigo and Kitagawa announced they were expecting a second child. Their second child, a son, was born on January 31, 2024.

== Filmography ==
=== Drama ===
- Invisible (2022), Rose
- Brothers in Arms (2026), Saitō Yoshitatsu
- The Ghost Writer's Wife (2026), doctor Yabui

Anime

- Anpanman: Dororin and the Transforming Carnival (June 2022) as Demon King Makkuro

Dubbing

- Wanted (2008) as Wesley Gibson
- Sodor's Legend of the Lost Treasure (April 2016) as Ryan
- Mission: Impossible – Fallout (2019) as August Walker
