= Haru Natsu Aki Fuyu =

Japanese manga

- Cover

春夏秋冬
- Genre: Erotic, romance, yuri
- Manga
- Written by: Eiki Eiki
- Illustrated by: Taishi Zaou
- Published by: Sun Magazine; Ichijinsha
- English publisher: JManga
- Magazine: Yuri Shimai; Comic Yuri Hime
- Published: 2007
- Volumes: 1

Haru Natsu Aki Fuyu (Japanese: 春夏秋冬; "Spring, Summer, Fall, Winter") is a Japanese erotic romance yuri manga written by Eiki Eiki and illustrated by Taishi Zaou. It was serialized on Yuri Shimai and Comic Yuri Hime and published in a single volume by Ichijinsha. It was published in English on JManga and in French by Taifu Comics. Two drama CDs were also released.

== Characters ==
- Haruka

Voiced by: Yukari Tamura

- Akiho

Voiced by: Ryoko Shintani

- Fuyuka

Voiced by: Mamiko Noto

- Natsuki

Voiced by: Ayako Kawasumi

- Reiko

Voiced by: Tomoko Kawakami

- Ayano

Voiced by: Megumi Nasu

== Reception ==
On manga-news.com, the staff gave it a rating of 15 out of 20. On Manga Sanctuary, one of the staff members gave it a rating of 4 out of 10. On AnimeLand, the staff gave it a rating of "interesting" (4) out of 6. Erica Friedman gave it an overall rating of 8, saying "I don’t think this is their strongest work, but I really did appreciate the skill that went into tying up all the loose ends and making the thing work as a whole".
