= Eiki Eiki =

Japanese manga artist

- Born: Eiko Naitō (内藤 栄子); December 6, 1971 (age 54); Tokyo, Japan
- Occupation: Manga artist
- Relatives: Noboru Takeshita (grandfather); Daigo (brother); Keiko Kitagawa (sister-in-law)
- Writing career
- Genre: Fiction
- Subjects: Yaoi; Yuri
- Website: www.kozouya.com

Eiko Naitō (内藤 栄子; born December 6, 1971), known professionally as Eiki Eiki (影木 栄貴), is a Japanese manga artist. Active since 1998, most of her manga are written under the yaoi and yuri genre.

== Biography ==
Naitō was born on December 6, 1971, in Tokyo. Her grandfather Noboru Takeshita was Prime minister of Japan, and her younger brother is the rock singer Daigo. She lived in Ichikawa, Chiba but moved back to Tokyo after her grandfather became prime minister.

Since 2016, she has been the sister-in-law of actress Keiko Kitagawa.

One of her good friends, also a fellow manga artist, is Mikiyo Tsuda, otherwise known as Taishi Zaō. They often co-author manga together, display their art together, and have autograph sessions together. Naitō has sometimes acted as Tsuda's manager. Naitō's persona Eiki Eiki's is a rabbit wearing a red bow tie.

== Works ==
- The Art of Loving
- Dear Myself
  - Unmei ni Kiss - sequel
  - World's End - sequel
- Prime Minister
- Train Train
- Yuigon
- Scissors Sisters - coauthored with Daigo and drawn by Marico.

=== Co-authored with Taishi Zaō ===
- Color (1999)
- Haru Natsu Aki Fuyu (2007) - a collection of yuri stories that were serialized in Yuri Hime, such as She-Wolf and First Kiss.
- Love DNA Double X
- Love Stage!!
