= Little Butterfly =

Japanese manga series

- Cover of Vol 1 of Juné's English translation

リトル・バタフライ (Ritoru. Batafurai)
- Genre: Yaoi, Drama, Romance
- Manga
- Written by: Hinako Takanaga
- Published by: Kaiōsha
- English publisher: NA: Digital Manga Publishing
- Original run: January 10, 2004 – February 10, 2004
- Volumes: 3

Little Butterfly (リトル・バタフライ, Ritoru. Batafurai) is a Japanese manga written and illustrated by Hinako Takanaga. It is published in Japan by Kaiōsha, and is licensed in North America by Digital Manga Publishing, in Taiwan by Taiwan Tohan, in Germany by Tokyopop Germany and in France by Taifu Comics.

== Plot ==
When the cheerful junior high student Kojima decides to make friends with the loner Nakahara, he discovers that Nakahara has a lonely home life, as his father is distant, and his mother is mentally unhinged. Kojima finds that his feelings for Nakahara are romantic, and Nakahara confesses his own feelings towards Kojima. Nakahara applies for a scholarship at a distant high school to escape his home life, and Kojima, despite having much worse marks than Nakahara, decides to apply for the same school, so that they can continue to be together. Nakahara helps Kojima study, but Nakahara's sexual advances on Kojima are rebuffed. Nakahara has a crisis at home and stays at Kojima's house for a while, and their relationship becomes more physical.

== Publication ==
Little Butterfly is written and illustrated by Hinako Takanaga. Kaiōsha released the manga's three bound volumes between January 10, 2004, and February 10, 2004. It is licensed in North America by Digital Manga Publishing, which released the manga's three volumes between May 17, 2006, and January 25, 2007. Digital Manga Publishing is republishing Little Butterfly in an omnibus edition to be released in February 2010. It is licensed in Taiwan by Taiwan Tohan, which released the manga's three volumes between August 8, 2005, and December 23, 2005. It is licensed in Germany as Kleiner Schmetterling by Tokyopop Germany, which released the three volumes between August 2005 and January 2006.

== Reception ==
Mania Entertainment's Julie Rosato comments on the manga's "so sweet that it actually hurts" relationship between the protagonists. A review of the second volume of the manga by Rosato comments on the lack of relationships like the ones between the protagonists in the yaoi genre. She also comments on the "odd blurring effect on a handful of pages". Of the third volume of the manga, Rosato comments on the protagonists "open dialogue never took a back seat to the romantic "action" - quite often a pitfall in this genre". Active Anime described the art as "graceful and beautiful", and the story as being "mature and sophisticated".
