= Kuudere =

Japanese term for characters that show little emotion

Cosplayer as Rei Ayanami, who is said to have popularized this character archetype

Kuudere (クーデレ; pronounced [kɯːdeɾe]) is a Japanese term for a character who appears to not have emotions. They are often stoic and expressionless, and they remain calm in stressful situations.

In contrast to tsundere and yandere characters, whose archetypes revolve around change in their behavior, kuudere characters often keep the same core traits throughout a narrative. Other kuudere characters traits include being aloof, being level-headed, and serving as the voice of reason during conflict.

The word is derived from the words "cool" (クール, kūru) and "affectionate" (デレデレ, dere dere). The term refers to one of four popular Japanese character types, the others being tsundere, yandere, and dandere. Rei Ayanami of Neon Genesis Evangelion is thought to have played a major role in the popularization of kuudere.

== Relation to tsundere ==
In his 2008 paper on the tsundere character archetype, Professor Junichi Togashi of Daito Bunka University mentioned that tsundere characters who do not use standard tsundere expressions could be classified as kuudere.

In the book "Basic Knowledge of Modern Terminology 2007", it is stated that sunao kuuru (素直クール) ('honest cool') can be thought of as the opposite of tsundere. The term is used to refer to characters who casually mention strange topics in a calm and irreverent manner, causing embarrassment to the listener. This term has since been used to refer to both kuudere and tsundere characters.

== Examples in media ==
- Rei Ayanami from Neon Genesis Evangelion
- C.C. from Code Geass
- Minami Iwasaki from Lucky Star
- Yuki Nagato from Haruhi Suzumiya
- Kanade Tachibana from Angel Beats!
- Akame from Akame ga Kill!
- Takara Shiga from Takara's Treasure
- Kyoko Kirigiri from Danganronpa

== See also ==
- Apathy
- Extraversion and introversion
- Reduced affect display
- Glossary of anime and manga
