= Cosmetic Playlover =

Japanese manga series

- Cover of vol. 1 of the Japanese version, released on August 9, 2018

コスメティック・プレイラバー (Kosumetikku Pureirabā)
- Genre: Romance, boys' love
- Manga
- Written by: Sachi Narashima
- Published by: Libre
- English publisher: NA: Animate International
- Imprint: BBC Deluxe
- Magazine: Magazine Be × Boy
- Original run: December 7, 2017 – November 7, 2025
- Volumes: 10
- Television drama
- Directed by: Takehiro Shindō
- Written by: Hiroko Kanasugi
- Music by: Kōji Endō
- Studio: NBCUniversal Entertainment Japan
- Licensed by: GagaOOLala
- Original network: Fuji TV; Fuji TV On Demand
- Original run: August 6, 2024 – March 20, 2026
- Episodes: 18

Cosmetic Playlover (Japanese: コスメティック・プレイラバー, Hepburn: Kosumetikku Pureirabā) is a Japanese manga series by Sachi Narashima. It is serialized in the monthly boys' love manga magazine Magazine Be × Boy from December 7, 2017, to November 7, 2025. In addition, two spin-offs, Bitterness Playlover and Twilight Playlover, were also serialized in Magazine Be × Boy.

A live-action television drama adaptation premiered on Fuji TV on August 6, 2024, and ran for 8 episodes. A second season ran from January 16, 2026, to March 20, 2026, for 10 episodes.

== Plot ==
Natsume Mamiya and Touma Sahashi work as department store beauty consultants for the cosmetics brand Romy Feerique, where they are known as the "two princes". However, Natsume is constantly annoyed with Touma for not taking his job seriously despite his potential. One day, Touma discovers that Natsume is gay and decides to use his secret to get closer to him. After the two begin dating, they navigate through a myriad of obstacles in their relationship, such as rivals, misunderstandings, and their long-distance relationship once Touma begins working as a make-up artist for Romy Feerique's French headquarters.

In addition to Natsume and Sahashi, there are two side stories focusing on the relationships of other characters in the story: Bitterness Playlover, which focuses on Keigo Kakizaki (Natsume's acquaintance) and Yukito Saionji's (Touma's high school senior) relationship; and Twilight Playlover, which focuses on Atsushi Nanjo and Iori Kosaka's (Nanjo's high school classmate) relationship.

== Characters ==
Natsume Mamiya (間宮 棗, Mamiya Natsume)
Voiced by: Chiaki Kobayashi (audio drama); Portrayed by: So Okuno
Natsume is an earnest, hard-working beauty consultant. He is described as "pure-hearted". In volume 3, he is promoted to manager of his store.
Touma Sahashi (佐橋 斗真, Sahashi Tōma)
Voiced by: Kent Itō (audio drama); Portrayed by: Yudai Toyoda
Touma is Natsume's junior co-worker who also works as a beauty consultant. He is a former model, but he quit after his senior co-workers staged a dating rumor out of jealousy for his competence. Touma is a talented and highly skilled beauty consultant, but he tends to be nonchalant. He is described as having a "cheeky and cool" personality. After he begins dating Natsume, he becomes a possessive yet doting boyfriend. Later in the series, Touma trains to become a make-up artist for Romy Feerique.
Atsushi Nanjo (南条 敦, Nanjō Atsushi)
Voiced by: Tomohito Takatsuka (audio drama); Portrayed by: Shunta Sono
Nanjo is a make-up assistant from the Kansai region. He immediately becomes attracted to Natsume and irritates Touma, but he acts as a big brother figure to them. He is the main character of the side story Twilight Playlover.
Tanouchi (田之内)
Voiced by: Tomohiro Ōno (audio drama); Portrayed by: Yūichi Nakamura
Tanouchi is a former beauty consultant who currently works in the sales department of Romy Feerique. He was the person who inspired Natsume to become a beauty consultant and is his first love.
Tenma Sahashi (佐橋 天真, Sahashi Tenma)
Portrayed by: Gaku Oshida
Tenma is Touma's estranged older brother.
Harada (原田)
Portrayed by: Nozomi Seina
Harada is the manager of Romy Feerique. In volume 3, she is transferred to Romy Feerique's brand headquarters.
Aizawa (相沢)
Portrayed by: Ayano Kudō
Aizawa is the sub-manager at Romy Feerique.
Taichi Harukawa (春川 汰一, Harukawa Taichi)
Portrayed by: Tomoki Yonemura
Harukawa is a new employee in the sales department and is Natsume and Touma's junior. While eager to work, he is very clumsy. He falls in love with Natsume, but he also supports Natsume and Touma's relationship.
Keigo Kakizaki (柿崎 圭吾, Kakizaki Keigo)
Portrayed by: Kaito Hori
Kakizaki is a beauty consultant from a different brand. He resents Natsume and accuses him of stealing a customer in the past, which resulted in Natsume transferring locations. Kakizaki later becomes one of the main characters in the spin-off Bitterness Playlover, where, four years after losing a customer to Natsume, it is revealed that he has become a concierge for the Miharu Department Store. Kakizaki struggles with his low self-esteem in hitting his sales quota and pleasing his father. When Yukito becomes one of his clients, Kakizaki eventually realizes he returns Yukito's feelings for him.
Risa Yumihara (弓原 リサ, Yumihara Risa)
Portrayed by: Fuka Sugiura
Risa is a famous model and the brand muse for Romy Feerique. She is from the same talent agency as Touma when he used to work as a model. Her real name is Risako (梨沙子).
Emma Lauren (エマ・ローレン, Ema Rōren)
Emma is the top make-up artist for Romy Feerique and works for the flagship store in Paris, France. In addition to French, she is fluent in Japanese, having lived in Japan from her childhood up to when she was in fourth grade. She is married to a Japanese man and has a daughter named Alice. Emma sees potential in Touma and invites him to train with her in Paris.
Yukito Saionji (西園寺 幸人, Saionji Yukito)
Saionji is one of the main characters in the spin-off Bitterness Playlover. He is Touma's senior from high school. He is from a wealthy family known for their winery and owns his own label, Yukito. He is eccentric and enjoys teasing people's weak points. Saionji is in love with Kakizaki and hires him as a concierge.
Iori Kosaka (小坂 伊織, Kosaka Iori)
Kosaka is one of the main characters in the spin-off Twilight Playlover. He is Nanjo's classmate from high school in Osaka and is in love with him.

== Media ==
=== Manga ===
Cosmetic Playlover is written and illustrated by Sachi Narashima. It is serialized in the monthly boys' love manga magazine Magazine Be × Boy since the January 2018 issue released on December 7, 2017, to the December 2025 issue released on November 7, 2025. The chapters were later released in eight bound volumes by Libre under the BBC Deluxe imprint.

The manga is licensed in English by Animate International and distributed digitally. The English version also includes the limited edition comic booklets from Animate and digital bonus comics.

Narashima created the concept of Cosmetic Playlover after hearing from a beauty consultant friend mention that there were men who also worked as beauty consultants. A challenge she faced in drawing the series was drawing make-up products, which she soon got used to.

==== Cosmetic Playlover ====
No.	Original release date	Original ISBN	English release date	English ISBN
1	August 9, 2018	978-4799739631	November 22, 2022	—
1. Play 1 Play 1.5 (Note: This is a bonus chapter that has never been serialized in Magazine Be × Boy and only released through the bound volumes.); 2. Play 2; 3. Play 3; 4. Play 4; 5. Play 5; 6. Play 6; 7. Play 7 Play 7.5; Bitterness Playlover (ビターネス・プレイラバー, Bitānesu Pureirabā); Afterword (あとがき, Atogaki); Digital Bonus (電子限定書下ろし, Denshi gentei kakioroshi) (Note: This chapter was only released through digital versions of the volume. It is also included in the English version.)
Natsume is frustrated that his junior co-worker, Touma, is disrespectful and does not take his job seriously. One day, Touma discovers Natsume is in love with Tanouchi and promises to keep his secret if they have a friends with benefits relationship. Despite it all, Natsume sees career potential in Touma and advocates for him, causing Touma to declare his seriousness in being a beauty consultant so that he could show Natsume how serious he is about his feelings towards him. Later, Natsume receives harassing phone calls and rumors about his client relationships, threatening his career. With Touma's help, Natsume is able to clear his name, and he admits he has fallen in love with Touma.
2	April 10, 2019	978-4799742860	April 25, 2023	—
8. Play 8; 9. Play 9; 10. Play 10; 11. Play 11; 12. Play 12; 13. Play 13; Bitterness Playlover Play 2 (ビターネス・プレイラバー Play.2, Bitānesu Pureirabā Play 2); Bitterness Playlover Play 2.5 (ビターネス・プレイラバー Play.2.5, Bitānesu Pureirabā Play 2.5); Play 13.5; Afterword (あとがき, Atogaki)
Romy Feerique is having a two-week demonstration event at their stores, and Touma is selected by the brand model, Risa Yumihara, to be her make-up artist. However, Natsume, who has only started dating Touma, feels uneasy about this, as Touma and Risa have a close relationship stemming from when they used to work as models together. In addition, Nanjo, an openly gay make-up artist, has temporarily been transferred to the store in Touma's place, and expresses romantic interest in Natsume. After clearing up their misunderstandings, Touma reaffirms his love for Natsume and gives him a pair of earrings.
3	December 10, 2019	978-4799745977	June 27, 2023	—
14. Play 14; 15. Play 15; 16. Play 16; 17. Play 17; 18. Play 18; 19. Play 19; 20. Play 20 Play 20.5; Bitterness Playlover: Saionji-sama's Unpredictable Afternoon (ビターネス・プレイラバー 西園寺さまの気まぐれ昼下がり, Bitānesu Pureirabā: Saionji-sama no Kimagure Hirusagari); Afterword (あとがき, Atogaki); Digital Bonus (電子限定書下ろし, Denshi gentei kakioroshi)
Natsume is promoted to manager at the store, while Touma is transferred to the Ginza location, and because they have little time to see each other, Touma proposes that Natsume move into his apartment. Natsume is overwhelmed by his new position as he struggles with new responsibilities and a sales event, which strains his relationship with Touma. When Natsume recovers from his illness, his co-workers remind him to depend on them for help, including Harukawa, a new sales employee. Through this, Natsume realizes how much Touma wants to support him, and once Touma returns from a training session in Paris, he apologizes to him.
4	August 11, 2020	978-4799748893	January 30, 2024	—
21. Play 21; 22. Play 22; 23. Play 23; 24. Play 24; 25. Play 25; 26. Play 26; Bitterness Playlover Play 3 (ビターネス・プレイラバー Play 3, Bitānesu Pureirabā Play 3); Play 26.5; Afterword (あとがき, Atogaki); Digital Bonus (電子限定書下ろし, Denshi gentei kakioroshi)
Natsume moves in with Touma. At an after-work dinner, Harukawa confesses to Natsume that he is love with him, causing Touma to reveal their relationship to him; however, Harukawa supports their relationship. Later, Natsume notices a stalker at Romy Feerique, to which Touma reveals is his estranged older brother, Tenma. Tenma reveals that their family runs a fashion brand in New York and wants Touma to return with him to work there. When Natsume suggests to Touma that he should talk things over with Tenma, Touma becomes angry, causing a rift in their relationship. At the fireworks festival, Natsume and Touma apologize to each other with Harukawa's help. Touma tells Natsume that he is fine with not having a close relationship with his family, but he makes amends with Tenma, nonetheless.
5	April 9, 2021	978-4799752104	April 16, 2024	—
27. Play 27; 28. Play 28; 29. Play 29; 30. Play 30 Play 30.5; 31. Play 31; 32. Play 32; Bitterness Playlover Play 4 (ビターネス・プレイラバー Play 4, Bitānesu Pureirabā Play 4); Play 32.5; Afterword (あとがき, Atogaki); Digital Bonus (電子限定書下ろし, Denshi gentei kakioroshi); Animate Bonus (Note: Animate sold a limited edition comic booklet bundled with the printed volume upon its initial release. The comics are also included in the English version.)
Romy Feerique is invited to take part in the Tokyo Style Stage, a fashion runway event, but Touma is asked to model for Tenma's brand and attracts great attention, to which Natsume learns that he is even asked to become Romy Feerique's PR model for their upcoming men's cosmetics line. Fearing that Touma will return to modeling, Natsume proposes a duel over their total sales, where the loser has to do whatever the winner says. When Touma doesn't take the duel seriously, Natsume impulsively adds another stipulation where the two will not be intimate with each other until the sales period is over, which causes tension in their relationship. Weeks after their duel begins, the two realize they cannot stay apart from each other and make up, with Touma clarifying that he turned down the offer after the organizers rejected his proposal to have Natsume as a staff feature. At Romy Feerique's end-of-the-year awards ceremony, both Natsume and Touma receive rookie awards.
6	May 10, 2022	978-4799757178	July 23, 2024	—
33. Play 33; 34. Play 34; 35. Play 35; 36. Play 36; 37. Play 37; 38. Play 38; "Sahashi and Natsume's Reunion Dinner" (佐橋と棗のおかえりごはん, Sahashi to Natsume no Okaeri Gohan); Bitterness Playlover Play 5 (ビターネス・プレイラバー Play 5, Bitānesu Pureirabā Play 5); Play 38.5; Afterword (あとがき, Atogaki); Digital Bonus (電子限定書下ろし, Denshi gentei kakioroshi); Animate Bonus
Natsume and Touma go on a business trip to Romy Feerique's flagship store in Paris for five days. During this time, they run into Emma Lauren, the top make-up artist for the brand. Emma sees potential in Touma to become her successor, but she also believes he lacks ambition. Natsume urges Touma to do what he wants to do rather than following his input, and Touma eventually accepts her offer. Despite that Touma will be in Paris for two years to study under her, he and Natsume promise to encourage each other. After a conversation about marriage and thinking about their relationship, Natsume and Touma consider the idea of getting married.
7	January 10, 2023	978-4799760987	November 19, 2024	—
39. Play 39; 40. Play 40; 41. Play 41; 42. Play 42; 43. Play 43; 44. Play 44; Bitterness Playlover Play 6 (ビターネス・プレイラバー Play 6, Bitānesu Pureirabā Play 6); Side Story (番外編, Bangai-hen); Play 44.5; Afterword (あとがき, Atogaki); Digital Bonus (電子限定書下ろし, Denshi gentei kakioroshi); Animate Bonus
Before Touma is scheduled to leave for Paris, he and Natsume are assigned to a project celebrating Romy Feerique's 50th anniversary, which includes a photoshoot for Risa that doubles as her marriage announcement. However, the project faces several revisions that leave Natsume and Touma exhausted every day. Despite his lack of experience, Natsume thoughtfully incorporates Risa's favorite dress and eyeshadow into the photoshoot. At the end of the photoshoot, Touma proposes to Natsume, promising that he will return.
8	February 8, 2024	978-4799766088	April 8, 2025	—
45. Play 45 Play 45.5; 46. Play 46; 47. Play 47 Play 47.5; 48. Play 48; 49. Play 49; 50. Play 50; Bitterness Playlover Play 7 (ビターネス・プレイラバー Play 7, Bitānesu Pureirabā Play 7); Play 50.5; Afterword (あとがき, Atogaki); Digital Bonus (電子限定書下ろし, Denshi gentei kakioroshi); Animate Bonus
Natsume is assigned to train Riku, a male beauty consultant who recently transferred to their store, and help improve his customer service skills. Meanwhile, Touma begins training in Paris, but he does not cooperate with Emma nor her protégés and overworks himself to exhaustion. When the next fashion show is missing a Japanese limited edition palette, Emma requests Natsume to bring it and to reinvigorate Touma. Through his bond with Natsume, Touma realizes he needs to build relationships with his clients and co-workers. Emma allows Touma to continue working with her, and Natsume and Touma spend time with each other before the former returns to Japan.
9	September 10, 2024	978-4799768778	January 22, 2026	—
51. Play 51; 52. Play 52 Play 52.5; 53. Play 53; 54. Play 54; Twilight Playlover: Reset (Part 1) (トワイライト・プレイラバー リセット 前編, Towairaito Pureirabā: Risetto Zenpen); Twilight Playlover: Reset (Part 2) (トワイライト・プレイラバー リセット 後編, Towairaito Pureirabā: Risetto Kōhen); Bitterness Playlover Play 8 (ビターネス・プレイラバー Play 8, Bitānesu Pureirabā Play 8); Play 53.5; Afterword (あとがき, Atogaki); Digital Bonus (電子限定書下ろし, Denshi gentei kakioroshi)
10	February 26, 2026	978-4799776582	—	—
Short stories	February 26, 2026	978-4799776599	—	—

==== Spin-offs ====
Aside from Cosmetic Playlover, Narashima wrote and illustrated two other side stories focusing on other characters in the series. Bitterness Playlover is serialized on a yearly basis in Magazine Be × Boy from the August 2018 issue released on July 6, 2018, to the December 2025 issue released on November 7, 2025. The series was later compiled in the main Cosmetic Playlover volumes. Twilight Playlover was serialized in Magazine Be × Boy from the November 2020 issue released on October 7, 2020 to the August 2021 issue released on July 7, 2021.

No.	Title	Japanese release date	Japanese ISBN
1	Towairaito Pureirabā (トワイライト・プレイラバー)	August 10, 2021	978-4799753712

=== Audio drama ===
A series of audio dramas adapting the manga was released onto CD by Marine Entertainment. The first volume was released on November 26, 2021. The second volume was released on May 31, 2024.

=== Television drama ===
A live-action television drama adaptation of Cosmetic Playlover was announced on July 1, 2024. It was broadcast on Fuji TV since August 6, 2024 (Note: Fuji TV lists the broadcast date as August 5, 2024, at 26:55, which is August 6, 2024, at 2:55 AM.) with a total of 8 episodes. Fuji TV On Demand, the channel's online streaming service, is also releasing two episodes per week with uncut content. The series is directed by Takehiro Shindō, with Hiroko Kanasugi in charge of the script and Kōji Endō in charge of music. The drama adaptation is produced by NBCUniversal Entertainment Japan. The theme song is "Wagamama Only Mine" by Urashimasakatasen, of which the CD jacket illustration was also provided by Sachi Narashima. It was streamed internationally outside of Japan and South Korea through GagaOOLala.

The series stars So Okuno as Natsume and Yudai Toyoda as Touma. Additional cast members include Milk member Shunta Sono as Nanjo, Gaku Oshida as Tenma, Nozomi Seina as Harada, Ayano Kudō as Aizawa, and Tomoki Yonemura as Harukawa.

A second season was announced on August 21, 2024, and is scheduled to broadcast in January 2026.

==== Season 1 (2024) ====
No. overall	No. in season	Title	Directed by	Written by	Original release date
1	1	"Can I Get Serious About You?"; Transliteration: "Ore, Honki ni Natte ii Desu ka?" (Japanese: 俺、本気になっていいですか？)	Takehiro Shindō	Hiroko Kanasugi	August 6, 2024 (online streaming)
2	2	"Let Me Overwrite the Meaning of Your Earrings"; Transliteration: "Piasu no Imi o Uwagakisasete" (Japanese: ピアスの意味を上書きさせて)	Takehiro Shindō	Hiroko Kanasugi	August 6, 2024 (online streaming)
3	3	"You're Pretty Unfair"; Transliteration: "Kekkō, Zurui Nen na" (Japanese: 結構、ズルいねんな)	Takehiro Shindō	Hiroko Kanasugi	August 13, 2024 (online streaming)
4	4	"A Life Passing Each Other By... The Two Princes Disband?!"; Transliteration: "Surechigai no Seikatsu... Daburu Ōji no Kaisan!?" (Japanese: すれ違いの生活…W王子の解散！？)	Takehiro Shindō	Hiroko Kanasugi	August 13, 2024 (online streaming)
5	5	"Commonly Made Medicine for the Heart"; Transliteration: "Zara Tsuku Kokoro no Shohōsen" (Japanese: ザラつく心の処方箋)	Takehiro Shindō	Hiroko Kanasugi	August 20, 2024 (online streaming)
6	6	"A New Life Where Preciousness Grows Stronger"; Transliteration: "Itoshisa ga Tsunoru Shin Seikatsu" (Japanese: 愛しさが募る新生活)	Takehiro Shindō	Hiroko Kanasugi	August 20, 2024 (online streaming)
7	7	"Fireworks and Promises"; Transliteration: "Hanabi to Yakusoku" (Japanese: 花火と約束)	Takehiro Shindō	Hiroko Kanasugi	August 27, 2024 (online streaming)
8	8	"The Real Duel is with My Lover"; Transliteration: "Honki no Shōbu wa Koibito to." (Japanese: 本気の勝負は恋人と。)	Takehiro Shindō	Hiroko Kanasugi	August 27, 2024 (online streaming)

==== Season 2 (2026) ====
No. overall	No. in season	Title	Directed by	Written by	Original release date
9	1	"I Love How You Work Hard, Natsume"; Transliteration: "Natsume-san no Ganbare, Suki" (Japanese: 棗さんのがんばれ、好き)	Takehiro Shindō	Hiroko Kanasugi	January 16, 2026
10	2	"This Time, It's My Turn to Support You"; Transliteration: "Kondo wa Ore ga Sasaeru Ban da" (Japanese: 今度は俺が支える番だ)	Takehiro Shindō	Hiroko Kanasugi	January 23, 2026
11	3	"A New Male Beauty Consultant"; Transliteration: "Arata na Menzu BA" (Japanese: 新たなメンズBA)	Yoshikazu Sugiyama	Hiroko Kanasugi	January 30, 2026
12	4	"I Want to Be Like Mamiya"; Transliteration: "Mamiya-san Mitai ni Naritai" (Japanese: 間宮さんみたいになりたい)	Takehiro Shindō	Hiroko Kanasugi	February 6, 2026
13	5	"A Challenging Bridal Project"; Transliteration: "Zento Tanan na Buraidaru Kikaku" (Japanese: 前途多難なブライダル企画)	Takehiro Shindō	Hiroko Kanasugi	February 13, 2026
14	6	"I Want You to Praise Me..."; Transliteration: "Homete Hoshii Desu..." (Japanese: 褒めて欲しいです…)	Takehiro Shindō	Hiroko Kanasugi	February 20, 2026
15	7	"Our First Trip, a Promise That Ties Us Together"; Transliteration: "Hajimete no Ryokō, Musubu Yakusoku" (Japanese: 初めての旅行、結ぶ約束)	Yoshikazu Sugiyama	Hiroko Kanasugi	February 27, 2026
16	8	"Home Party Incident"; Transliteration: "Hōmu Pāti Jiken" (Japanese: ホームパーティ事件)	Takehiro Shindō	Hiroko Kanasugi	March 6, 2026
17	9	"Ready With My Allies Around Me"; Transliteration: "Mikata de Iru Kakugo" (Japanese: 味方でいる覚悟)	Takehiro Shindō	Hiroko Kanasugi	March 13, 2026
18	10	"The Two Princes are Back!"; Transliteration: "Fukkatsu! Daburu Ōji" (Japanese: 復活！W王子)	Takehiro Shindō	Hiroko Kanasugi	March 20, 2026

== Reception ==
Cosmetic Playlover won the 2021 Digital Comic Award by Comic CMoa in the BL category. In 2024, the series sold a consecutive total of over 1 million physical copies.
