= Mask Danshi: This Shouldn't Lead to Love =

Japanese manga series

- First tankōbon volume cover

マスク男子は恋したくないのに (Mask Danshi wa Koishitakunai no ni)
- Genre: Boys' love
- Manga
- Written by: Mitsuru Sangō
- Published by: Libre
- English publisher: NA: Animate International
- Imprint: B-Boy P! Comics
- Magazine: B-Boy P!
- Original run: November 26, 2019 – present
- Volumes: 4
- Original animation DVD
- Directed by: Naoko Takeichi
- Written by: Fumiyo Sakai
- Music by: Sōnosuke Takao
- Studio: Studio Fusion
- Released: October 20, 2023

Mask Danshi: This Shouldn't Lead to Love (マスク男子は恋したくないのに, Mask Danshi wa Koishitakunai no ni) is a Japanese yaoi manga series by Mitsuru Sangō. It has been serialized in Libre's B-Boy P! digital magazine since November 2019 and has been collected in four tankōbon volumes. The series is published in English by Animate International. An original animation DVD produced by Blue Lynx and animated by Studio Fusion was bundled with the limited edition of the manga's fourth volume in October 2023.

== Synopsis ==
Tsuzuru Saikawa, a popular and friendly guy, falls on Keigo Sayama, a loner who always wears a medical mask, on the stairs. Later in the infirmary, Saikawa takes off Sayama's mask, causing Sayama to curse him out. Sayama catches his attention, and Saikawa begins tutoring Sayama with the condition that he can do what he wants with what is under Sayama's mask.

== Characters ==
Tsuzuru Saikawa (才川 綴, Saikawa Tsuzuru)
Voiced by: Takuya Eguchi
Saikawa is part of Class 2-B.^{Ch.19} He is popular at school, frequently receiving confessions from girls. Saikawa sat in front of Sayama in class,^{Ch.1.5} and became interested in him after accidentally falling on him on the stairs.^{Ch.1} He is dating Sayama.^{Ch.10.5} Saikawa joins Yoshida's team for her campaign to become student council president.^{Ch.36} His parents got divorced when he was five, after which he began forcing a smile. Saikawa lives with his father.^{Ch.15} He works part-time at a cafe with his ex-girlfriend Yoshida.^{Ch.29}
Keigo Sayama (佐山 圭悟, Sayama Keigo)
Voiced by: Yūsuke Kobayashi
Sayama is part of Class 2-B.^{Ch.19} He always wears a mask, beginning to do so after making his crush Kobayashi cry in elementary school.^{Ch.3} Sayama is a loner, though he later begins talking to his classmates.^{Ch.9} He enjoys playing video games and reading manga.^{Ch.33} Sayama gets bad grades, though they improve with Saikawa's help.^{Ch.3} Yoshida forces him to join the senior trip committee.^{Ch.31} He also gives her campaign speech when she runs for student council president.^{Ch.38} Sayama is dating Saikawa.^{Ch.10.5} He lives with his mother and older sister, Chie.^{Ch.3} Sayama has a beauty mark near his mouth.^{Ch.9}
Teru Tsuruga (敦賀 テル, Tsuruga Teru)
Tsuruga is from Class 2-D, and is infamous for stealing other people's girlfriends.^{Ch.12} However, this stemmed from a misunderstanding with a friend whose girlfriend was interested in Tsuruga, who then decides to live up to the rumors.^{Ch.14} He has a crush on Sayama.^{Ch.19}
Riko Yoshida (吉田 莉子, Yoshida Riko)
Yoshida is the class representative for Class 2-A.^{Ch.31} She is later elected student council president.^{Ch.39} She is Saikawa's ex-girlfriend, and works part-time at a cafe with him.^{Ch.29} After she is elected president, she cuts her hair short.^{Ch.39}
Sayaka Kobayashi (小林 清香, Kobayashi Sayaka)
Kobayashi is a transfer student from Class 2-C.^{Ch.7} She is their representative for the senior trip committee.^{Ch.32} She was classmates with Sayama in elementary school.^{Ch.3}

== Media ==
=== Manga ===
No.	Original release date	Original ISBN	North American release date	North American ISBN
1	April 20, 2020	978-4-79-974735-3	April 5, 2022	978-1-64-711050-5
2	March 18, 2021	978-4-79-975159-6	September 27, 2022	—
3	April 20, 2022	978-4-79-975677-5	February 28, 2023	—
4	October 20, 2023	978-4-79-976282-0	June 18, 2024	—

=== Anime ===
An original animation DVD produced by Blue Lynx and animated by Studio Fusion was bundled with the limited edition of the manga's fourth volume on October 20, 2023.
