= Awkward Silence =

Japanese manga series

- Cover of the Japanese version of vol. 1, first published on August 10, 2006

不器用なサイレント (Bukiyō na Sairento)
- Genre: Boys' love
- Manga
- Written by: Hinako Takanaga
- Published by: Biblos (2004–2006); Libre (2006–2016)
- English publisher: NA: SuBLime
- Imprint: Be × Boy Comics
- Magazine: Magazine Be × Boy
- Original run: September 2004 – September 7, 2016
- Volumes: 6

Awkward Silence (Japanese: 不器用なサイレント, Hepburn: Bukiyō na Sairento) is a Japanese manga series written and illustrated Hinako Takanaga. It was serialized in the monthly boys' love manga magazine Magazine Be × Boy from September 2004 to September 2016.

== Plot ==
Satoru Tono is an introverted, expressionless high school student in love with Keigo Tamiya, a popular boy from the baseball club. One day, Keigo confesses to Satoru that he is in love with him, and while Satoru is overjoyed, his lack of facial expression and shyness makes it difficult for him to communicate his feelings. Over time, Keigo comes to understand Satoru more, and the two explore challenges in their relationship.

== Characters ==
Satoru Tono (遠野 智, Tōno Satoru)
Voiced by: Kōki Miyata
Satoru is a second-year high school student and a member of the art club. He does not easily show emotion on his face, causing many people to misunderstand him.
Keigo Tamiya (田宮 啓吾, Tamiya Keigo)
Voiced by: Hiroki Takahashi
Keigo is a second-year high school student and a member of the baseball club.
Yuji Sagara (相良 裕司, Sagara Yūji)
Voiced by: Kōji Yusa
Yuji is a third-year high school student and a member of the student council. He is Satoru's childhood friend.
Takahito Kagami (加賀見 隆仁, Kagami Takahito)
Voiced by: Tomokazu Sugita
Takahito is a third-year high school student and a member of the student council who falls in love with Yuji.

== Media ==
=== Manga ===
Awkward Silence is written and illustrated by Hinako Takanaga. It was serialized in monthly manga magazine Magazine Be × Boy beginning in the October 2004 issue released in September 2004. The series briefly went on hiatus, but resumed in the January 2011 issue of Magazine Be × Boy released on December 11, 2011, until its end in the October 2016 issue released on September 7, 2016. The chapters were later released in 6 bound volumes by Libre under the Be × Boy Comics imprint. Volumes 4 and 6 were distributed with comic booklets as a limited edition first press bonus.

Animate USA initially distributed the first volume of Awkward Silence overseas through the Kindle Store in 2010. In 2011, JManga listed the series as one of the titles they had planned on distributing in English. In February 2012, Viz Media licensed the series for North American distribution in English under their SuBLime imprint.

| No. | Original release date | Original ISBN | English release date | English ISBN |
|---|---|---|---|---|
| 1 | August 10, 2006 | 978-4-86263-028-5 | July 10, 2012 | 978-1-4215-4347-5 |
| 2 | July 10, 2008 | 978-4-86263-429-0 | October 23, 2012 | 978-1-4215-4353-6 |
| 3 | September 10, 2010 | 978-4-86263-832-8 | February 12, 2013 | 978-1-4215-4356-7 |
| 4 | March 9, 2013 | 978-4-7997-1271-9 (regular edition); 978-4-7997-1272-6 (limited edition with bonus booklet) | December 10, 2013 | 978-1-4215-5157-9 |
| 5 | March 10, 2015 | 978-4-7997-2504-7 | February 9, 2016 | 978-1-4215-8424-9 |
| 6 | January 10, 2017 | 978-4-7997-3194-9 | February 13, 2018 | 978-1-4215-9369-2 |

=== Drama CDs ===
Two drama CDs were produced by Libre under their boys' love CD label, Cue Egg Label, during the series' run, starring Kōki Miyata as Satoru Tono, Hiroki Takahashi as Keigo Tamiya, and Kōji Yusa as Yuji Sagara. The first drama CD was released on March 28, 2008, and peaked at #270 on the Oricon Weekly Albums Chart. The second drama CD was released on February 25, 2009, adding Tomokazu Sugita as a cast member, who voices Takahito Kagami.

== Reception ==
Volume 5 peaked at #45 on Oricon and sold 17,466 physical copies on its first week of sales.
