= Golden Cain =

Japanese manga

金のカイン (Kin no Cain)
- Genre: Yaoi
- Manga
- Written by: You Asagiri
- Published by: Biblos
- English publisher: NA: Central Park Media
- Magazine: Magazine Be × Boy
- Original run: March 2003 – unknown
- Volumes: 1

Golden Cain (金のカイン, Kin no Cain) is a yaoi manga by You Asagiri and serialized in Magazine Be-Boy by Biblos.

== Plot ==
The story is about Shun, a young man who works very hard to live up to the memory of his older brother, who in his eyes was always better than him at everything. Shun tries his best to live up to his brother's memory, so much so that he is willing to sacrifice everything that is important to him, even at the cost of his own personal life. Suddenly, a beautiful young stranger comes into his life and Shun is taken down a dangerous road of love, loss, lust, guilt, passion, and taboo.

== Book information ==
The yaoi manga, like many others, are sold in shrink-wrapped and carries an 18+ age advisory sticker to warn buyers about explicit content.

In 2010, Animate USA announced that it would republish Golden Cain in English on the Amazon Kindle format.
