= The Sky Over My Spectacles =

Japanese manga

眼鏡越しの空は… (Meganegoshi no Sora wa...)
- Genre: Yaoi
- Manga
- Written by: Mio Tennohji
- Published by: Libre Publishing
- English publisher: NA: 801 Media
- Magazine: Magazine Be × Boy
- Published: July 8, 2005

The Sky Over My Spectacles (眼鏡越しの空は…, Meganegoshi no Sora wa...) is a manga written and illustrated by Mio Tennohji. The manga was published in Japan by Libre Publishing. It is licensed in North America by 801 Media, as one of 801 Media's earliest titles.

== Reception ==
Holly Ellingwood characterises the manga as being more explicit than previous yaoi manga releases, but feels that there is enough character development to carry the story and render it romantic. Hannah Santiago, writing for the appendix to Manga: The Complete Guide, felt that the romance was realistically developed and appreciated the equality in their relationship. June Shimonshi, writing for Library Journal describes the manga as "formulaic" and as being solely driven by sex, finding the word balloons and panels difficult to follow. Shimonshi recommends Love Mode and the Finder series for those looking for explicit yaoi instead of this manga.
