= Clan of the Nakagamis =

Manga series

- Cover of Clan of the Nakagamis volume 1 as published by Biblos

仲神家の一族 (Nakagami-ke no Ichizoku)
- Genre: Yaoi
- Manga
- Written by: Homerun Ken
- Published by: Biblos
- English publisher: NA: Digital Manga Publishing
- Magazine: Magazine Be × Boy
- Published: July 8, 2005
- Volumes: 1

Clan of the Nakagamis (Japanese: 仲神家の一族, Hepburn: Nakagami-ke no Ichizoku) is a two volume yaoi manga by Homerun Ken and published by Biblos. The story is about Haruka Iijima and his teacher, Tokio Nakagami. Tokio has the body of a 14-year-old boy, despite being 25 and a math teacher. Haruku Iijima has the body of a tall, dashing young man though he's only a high school student. The couple attempt to make out, but Tokio's overprotective family, the Nakagimi Clan, keep getting in the way. In the second volume, subtitled The Devil Cometh, Tokio's cousin comes to visit, with plans to take over the family business and seduce Tokio.

== Reception ==
Clan of the Nakagimis has been described as 'light-hearted', being a "fresh look" at the romantic comedy genre. Library Journal describes the book as "zany", saying that it plays with conventions of shotacon and incest in fiction. The second volume's art has been described as "a wonderland of bishōnen"
