= Necratoholic =

Japanese manga by Maguro Wasabi

ネクラートホリック (Nekurātohoriku)
- Genre: Yaoi
- Manga
- Written by: Maguro Wasabi
- Published by: Libre Publishing
- English publisher: NA: Digital Manga Publishing
- Magazine: Magazine Be × Boy
- Published: October 10, 2006
- Volumes: 1

Necratoholic (ネクラートホリック, Nekurātohoriku) is a one-shot Japanese manga written and illustrated by Maguro Wasabi. The manga was published in Libre Publishing's manga magazine, Be x Boy. Libre Publishing released the manga's tankōbon volume on October 10, 2006. It is licensed in North America by Digital Manga Publishing, which released the manga through its imprint, Juné, on April 8, 2008.

== Reception ==
Leroy Douresseaux commends the manga for its art but criticises it for "flimsy and awkwardly developed" story. Danielle van Gorder commends the "random humor and the love/hate relationship between Sakuya and Atsumi". Holly Ellingwood commends the manga for its "tongue-in-cheek illustrative fun as in the case of the bat and extreme comedic expression on the part of the characters. And it has some original ideas like the tongue tattoos and their meaning."
