= Alcohol, Shirt and Kiss =

Japanese manga

- Cover of the English edition.

酒とYシャツとキス (Sake to Y-shirt to Kiss)
- Manga
- Written by: Yuko Kuwabara
- Published by: Libre Publishing
- English publisher: NA: Digital Manga Publishing
- Magazine: Magazine Be × Boy
- Published: March 21, 2007
- Volumes: 1

Alcohol, Shirt and Kiss (酒とYシャツとキス, Sake to Y-shirt to Kiss) is a one-shot Japanese manga written and illustrated by Yuko Kuwabara. It is her debut boys love manga. It is licensed in North America by Digital Manga Publishing, which released the manga through its imprint, Juné, on March 21, 2007.

== Reception ==
Mania.com's Patricia Beard comments on the level of sexuality of the manga, saying, "there is "consummation" and, while it is explicit in concept, it is not explicit graphically. Verbal references are very few. Graphic depictions are discreet and, in some cases, incomplete". Holly Ellingwood at ActiveAnime describes the manga as "fun, excitement and an engaging romance with sexy police officers".
