= Love Control =

Japanese manga series

恋愛操作（コントロール） (Renai Sousa)
- Genre: Yaoi
- Manga
- Written by: Ai Hasukawa
- Published by: Libre Publishing
- English publisher: NA: Digital Manga Publishing
- Magazine: Be × Boy Gold
- Original run: 10 November 2006 – 10 April 2023
- Volumes: 7

Love Control (恋愛操作（コントロール）, Renai Sousa) is a yaoi manga written and illustrated by Ai Hasukawa. It is licensed in English by Digital Manga Publishing, which released the first volume of the manga on 22 April 2008, and the second on 22 July 2009.

== Reception ==
Leroy Douresseaux enjoyed "the strong-willed leads" in the manga. Julie Rosato enjoyed the character designs, despite not usually enjoying salarymen, describing the series as a "guilty pleasure". Connie C. said that Love Control was "exactly what I like to see"... "an older couple in a steady, healthy, and passionate relationship". Danielle Leigh praised Hasukawa's sexy character designs. Rachel Bentham describes the finish of the story as being "delicious melodrama". Leroy Douresseaux felt the second volume "lacks heat". Shaenon Garrity sums up the manga as "pretty but unremarkable."
