= Truly Kindly =

Japanese manga

- English cover of Truly Kindly.

本当に、やさしい。 (Hontō ni, Yasashii.)
- Genre: Yaoi, Romance
- Manga
- Written by: Fumi Yoshinaga
- Published by: Biblos
- English publisher: NA: Blu
- Magazine: Magazine Be × Boy
- Published: March 1997
- Volumes: 1

Truly Kindly (本当に、やさしい。, Hontō ni, Yasashii.) is a one-shot Japanese manga written and illustrated by Fumi Yoshinaga. Biblos released the manga in March 1997.

It is licensed and published in North America by Blu on August 14, 2007.

== Reception ==
Pop Shock Culture's Katherine Dacey criticises the manga for her feelings of déjà vu "with its recycled character designs, clumsy socio-political lectures masquerading as conversation, and the "I didn't realize how much I liked you until you forced yourself on me!" epiphanies that her uke characters experience". Coolstreak Cartoons's Leroy Douresseaux describes the "mix of poignancy and surprises" in the manga as "engaging". Mania.com's Danielle Van Gorder commends the manga's "character's expressions, which can convey volumes without words". Jason Thompson, writing for the appendix to Manga: The Complete Guide, noted that Truly Kindly was one of Yoshinaga's early works, saying that "some of the plot twists feel arbitrary", and her art feels "flat", but the rest of the anthology "are just plain good relationship stories".

== See also ==
- Lovers in the Night – another anthology by Yoshinaga which contains a story about two of the characters from this book.
