= Tarako (disambiguation) =

Tarako (1960–2024) was a Japanese singer.

Tarako may also refer to:

- Tarako (food), Japanese salted cod roe
- Tarako, a Kōtarō Makaritōru! character
- "Tarako", a 1984 song by Tony Haynes

== People with the name ==
- Tarako Kotobuki, creator of Love Pistols, a Japanese yaoi manga series

== See also ==
- Tappuri! Tarako Man or Masa Takanashi, wrestler
