= Cut (manga) =

Japanese manga by Toko Kawai

- Cover of Cut as published by Biblos
- Genre: Yaoi
- Manga
- Written by: Toko Kawai
- Published by: Biblos
- English publisher: NA: Digital Manga Publishing
- Magazine: Magazine Be × Boy
- Published: March 10, 2003
- Volumes: 1

Cut is a one-shot Japanese manga written and illustrated by Toko Kawai. It was serialized in Biblos's magazine, Magazine Be x Boy, finishing at 5 chapters. It is licensed in North America by Digital Manga Publishing, which released the manga through its imprint, Juné, on March 25, 2009. It is licensed in France as Juste au Coin de la Rue by Taifu Comics. Biblos released the manga on March 10, 2003.

== Plot ==
Sakaguchi is in a sexual relationship with his stepfather who is abusive, but he enjoys the pain because it helps mask darker memories from his past. He then meets another student with a troubled background, who may be the person to help him stop his self-inflicted pain.

== Reception ==
Coolstreak Comics' Leroy Douresseaux comments on the author's "evocative art, in which she emphasizes emotion in body language, facial expressions". Active Anime's Holly Ellingwood also comments on Toko Kawai's art, saying, "the more serious overtones of this story give the artist a chance to show the more stark and dramatic side to her illustrations and imagination". Pop Shock Culture's Michelle Smith comments on the scenes "involving incest and masochism" saying, they are "not played for titillation".
