= Hey, Sensei? =

One-shot manga

ねえ、先生? (Nē, Sensei?)
- Genre: Yaoi
- Manga
- Written by: Yaya Sakuragi
- Published by: Biblos
- English publisher: EU: Carlson Comics; NA: Digital Manga Publishing
- Magazine: Magazine Be × Boy
- Published: April 10, 2007
- Volumes: 1

Hey, Sensei? (Japanese: ねえ、先生?, Hepburn: Nē, Sensei?) is a one-shot Japanese manga written and illustrated by Yaya Sakuragi. It was serialised in Biblos's Magazine Be x Boy. It is licensed in North America by Digital Manga Publishing, which released the manga through its imprint, Juné, on April 22, 2009. The manga is licensed in Germany as Lieber Lehrer... by Carlson Comics. Biblos released the manga on April 10, 2007.

== Plot ==
The high school teacher Tomohiko Isa used to date a woman, Kaori Homura. Their relationship ended because Isa is not sexually attracted to women, and he would spend time with her younger brother, Takashi Homura, instead. Years later, Takashi has become Tomohiko's student, Takashi flirts with him, and they begin a secret sexual relationship. Takashi is initially jealous of Tomohiko's old relationship with Kaori, but Takashi and Tomohiko become closer, and start searching for an apartment to move into together. Takashi catches another teacher, Kurehara, discussing apartment-searching with Tomohiko. Takashi thinks that he will not be trusted because he is a teenager, but Tomohiko calms his worries and they move in together. Kurehara confesses to Tomohiko that he has been dating a female student, and wants to marry her after she graduates, but is concerned that she is only interested because of her limited experience. Tomohiko briefly worries that the same problems may apply to Takashi, but lets go to live in the moment. Kurehara tells his student that he wants them to get married, and she immediately ends their relationship. Takashi witnesses this and asks Tomohiko about their future, and Tomohiko reaffirms that they will stay together.

An unrelated single-chapter story, "Unbreakable Bone", is also included in the volume. In it, a man, Yuuji, learns that his childhood friend, Manabu Kazukabe, is now a police officer who works close by. Manabu tells Yuuji that he is glad to have been assigned to this place because he can protect Yuuji, but Yuuji is angered. The next day, Yuuji apologizes and admits that he was a delinquent that dropped out of high school, but Manabu comforts him and confesses his love right before they have sex.

== Reception ==
Rachel Bentham commends that the manga is "a seductively sweet romance about a taboo love in the halls of high school!" Leroy Douresseaux commends the author for her illustrations saying, "Sakuragi skillful page design and pretty sequential art make Hey, Sensei? a better-than-average read; if only, the story was as catchy as the visuals". Melinda Beasi commends the manga's art saying, "Yaya Sakuragi's art is also a highlight. Her faces are expressive (both in the main feature and in the short extra story, "Unbreakable Bones") and her lanky character designs help to alleviate worries about the age difference between Isa and Homura as well, as Homura's body is unambiguously adult".
