= Yū Asagiri =

Japanese manga artist (1956–2018)

Yū Asagiri あさぎり夕
- Born: Yuriko Takano (高野 夕里子); July 21, 1956 Tokyo, Japan
- Died: 27 October 2018 (aged 62)
- Area: Manga artist
- Notable works: Nanairo Magic; Golden Cain
- Awards: 1987 Kodansha Manga Award for shōjo

Yuriko Takano (高野 夕里子, Takano Yuriko), better known by the pen name Yū Asagiri (あさぎり夕 or 朝霧夕 Asagiri Yū), was a female Japanese manga artist from Tokyo, Japan. She made her professional manga debut in 1976. Asagiri received the 1987 Kodansha Manga Award for shōjo for Nanairo Magic ("Seven Colors Magic"). She died on 27 October 2018 from severe pneumonia.

== Works ==
Asagiri started her career in 1978 drawing shōjo manga in Kodansha's Nakayoshi magazine. In the mid-1990s, she switched to josei manga, and to boy's love manga. She also provided illustrations for boy's love novels.

=== Shojo manga ===
- Aoi Uchuu no Runa (Nakayoshi, 1978, 1 volume)
- Hanashishuu Kodemari ni Yosete (Nakayoshi, 1978, 1 volume)
- Watashi no Koi wa Hoshi Makase (Nakayoshi, 1980, 1 volume)
- Kirara Hoshi no Daiyogen (Nakayoshi, 1981, 2 volumes). Story by Kyoko Mizuki.
- Aitsu ga Hero! (Nakayoshi Deluxe, 1981–82, 2 volumes)
- Ashita Kara no Hero (Nakayoshi Deluxe, 1984, 1 volume)
- Kocchi Muite Love! (Nakayoshi, 1982–83, 4 volumes)
- Apple Dream (Nakayoshi, 1984–85, 3 volumes)
- Akogare Boukensha (Nakayoshi, 1985–86, 3 volumes)
- Nanairo Magic (Nakayoshi, 1987–88, 6 volumes)
- Ai Boy (Nakayoshi, 1988–90, 5 volumes)
- Sotsugyou Shashin (Nakayoshi Deluxe, 1988, 1 volume)
- Minmin! (Nakayoshi, 1990–93, 5 volumes)
- Kon na Panic (Nakayoshi, 1991–92, 5 volumes)
- Himawari Nikki (Nakayoshi, 1991, 1 volume)
- Alice no Jikan (Nakayoshi Deluxe, 1991–92, 1 volume)
- Onnanoko no Fushigi (Shōjo Friend, 1990, 1 volume)
- Onnanoko no Ho-n-ki (Shōjo Friend, 1991, 1 volume)
- Kurenai Densetsu (Shōjo Friend, 1991, 4 volumes)
- Kyasshu na Kankei (Shōjo Friend, 1993, 4 volumes)
- Yume de Aetar (Shōjo Friend, 1995, 2 volumes)
- Oneesan no Jijou (Bessatsu Friend, 1994, 1 volume)
- B.B. Tengoku (Bessatsu Friend, 1995, 2 volumes)
- Eve no Subete (1994, 1 volume)

=== Josei manga ===
- Midnight Panther (Gakken's Monthly Comic Nora, 1994–97, 23 volumes).

=== Boy's love manga ===
- Knock o 3-kai (Houbunsha's Hanaoto, 1995, 1 volume)
- Second Love (Hanaoto, 1997, 2 volume2)
- Lonely Soldier (1998, 1 volume)
- Gogo no Ihoujin (Be x Boy, 1999, volume)
- Lover's Kiss (1999, 1 volume)
- Miserarete (2000, 1 volume)
- Hitomi no Honne (2001, 1 volume)
- Hitomi no Giwaku (2002, 1 volume)
- Kin no Cain (Golden Cain) (2003, 1 volume)
- Joouheika no Oniwaban (2004, 1 volume. Re-edited by Libre in 2009
- Mr. Secret Floor series (Be x Boy Gold, 2010-ongoing, 5 volumes)
  - Mr. Secret Floor - Shousetsuka no Tawamure na Hibiki (2011)
  - Mr. Secret Floor - Honoo no Ouji (2012)
  - Mr. Secret Floor - Sabaku no Kaori no Otoko (2013)
  - Mr. Secret Floor - Gunpuku no Koibito (2015)
  - Mr. Secret Floor - Boku wo Kurau Kemono no Kagayaki (2016)

=== Illustration books ===
- In the 2 decades Asagiri Yu Illustration Collection (1997, Gakken).
