= Black Knight (manga) =

Japanese manga series

- Cover of the first volume of Black knight as published by Libre Publishing
- Genre: Yaoi
- Manga
- Written by: Kai Tsurugi
- Published by: Libre Publishing
- English publisher: NA: Blu Manga
- Magazine: Magazine Be × Boy
- Original run: August 5, 2003 – January 4, 2008
- Volumes: 5

Black Knight (Japanese: 黒の騎士, Hepburn: Kuro no Kishi) is a Japanese manga written and illustrated by Kai Tsurugi. It is licensed in North America by Blu Manga, the boys love division of Tokyopop, which released the four volumes between July 2006 and February 2009 before the publisher went defunct..

== Plot ==
The Prince Christen Jeremy is sent to train at a knight's academy. Young, inexperienced and kind-hearted, he is new to the life of a knight-in-training. On his first day, Chris encounters the Black Knight, Zeke, who takes him under his wing in the academy, helping him in training and wherever he can. However, a plot seems to be simmering to assassinate the prince—and the Black Knight may be the only one who can save him.

== Characters ==
- Prince Christen Jeremy The youngest prince in the kingdom. Fair-haired and approximately sixteen years old, with girlish features, similar to his mother. He is attending a knights' training academy at the request of his father, the king. He is soft-hearted, thinking animals should not be hunted, if not for food. He thinks well of his family and doesn't want to be a burden to someone.
- Black Knight 'Zeke' Third in the Spring-ranking kingdom challenges, which touts him as an extraordinary swordsman. The two in the top rankings were full-knights, earning his position in third place is considered quite an accomplishment. The academy head gave him a special black uniform as a reward for that. He cares about his close friends, is close to the prince and worries about the important things. He currently has no family, as his grandmother died and he has no other survivors.

== Reception ==
Library Journal, reviewing the first volume, noted that Black Knight "does have a plot", but was disappointed at several minor characters having too-similar character designs. Holly Ellingwood, writing for Active Anime, found Black Knight to be "heart-warming tale of love in a harsh time of deadly warfare", and that Black Knight had both "style and substance", due to its many layered plots, feeling that the manga would work just as well regardless of the sex of the couple.
