= Don't Be Cruel (manga) =

Japanese manga series

- Cover of the Japanese first edition of vol. 1, first published on January 10, 2007

酷くしないで (Hidoku Shinaide)
- Genre: Yaoi
- Manga
- Written by: Yonezou Nekota
- Published by: Libre
- English publisher: NA: SuBLime
- Imprint: Be × Boy Comics
- Magazine: Magazine Be × Boy
- Original run: 2006 – present
- Volumes: 11 (+1 side story)
- Manga

Don't Be Cruel: Plus+
- Published by: Libre
- English publisher: NA: SuBLime
- Imprint: Be × Boy Comics
- Magazine: B-Boy Cube
- Published: 2015
- Volumes: 2

Don't Be Cruel (Japanese: 酷くしないで, Hepburn: Hidoku Shinaide; Treat Me Gently, Please in Japan) is a Japanese yaoi manga series written and illustrated by Yonezou Nekota. It is serialized in the monthly manga magazine Magazine Be × Boy since 2006.

Don't Be Cruel originally had a limited run as a series of short stories in 2006. After publishing several dōjinshi and Don't Be Cruel: Plus+ in the magazine B-Boy Cube, Nekota decided to resume the series in 2010. Over the run of the series, several drama CD adaptations have been released, and by 2018, 1.4 million physical copies of the series have been sold.

== Plot ==
Takashi Nemugasa is a student at an elite high school, but he is at risk of losing his scholarship due to his grades. He decides to cheat on his test, but he is caught by the school's womanizing playboy, Hideyuki Maya, who blackmails him into having a sexual relationship in exchange for not reporting him. Over time, Maya discovers he is attracted to Nemugasa and does his best to support him, while Nemugasa slowly realizes that he may return Maya's feelings for him as well.

== Characters ==
Takashi Nemugasa (眠傘 隆, Nemugasa Takashi)
Voiced by: Yoshiki Nakajima
Nemugasa is an honor student with a conservative, strict upbringing.
Hideyuki Maya (真矢 秀幸, Maya Hideyuki)
Voiced by: Takuma Terashima
Maya is Nemugasa's classmate, who is reputed to be a delinquent and is popular at school for his womanizing ways. When he blackmails Nemugasa, he realizes he is genuinely in love with him and becomes more mature about their relationship and his image.
Akira Takanashi (小鳥遊 彰, Takanashi Akira)
Voiced by: Wataru Hatano
Akira is Maya's cousin and tutor. He is protective of Maya and initially antagonizes Nemugasa, but later becomes a source of advice for the two. He is jaded after his high school teacher rejected him, but he finds support through Shimakawa.
Naoya Shimakawa (縞川 直也, Shimakawa Naoya)
Voiced by: Ryota Takeuchi
Shimakawa is a 5th year medical student in college who is infamous for being a womanizer, but he falls love with Akira and patiently waits for him to return his feelings.
Ruka (流夏)
Ruka is Maya's senior in college.
Shotaro Okino (沖野 正太郎, Okino Shōtarō)
Voiced by: Kazutomi Yamamoto
Okino is a boy who Nemugasa befriends when they enter college. Okino identifies as gay and openly dreams of getting a boyfriend, believing Maya to be his ideal man.
Jutta Takanashi (小鳥遊 十太, Takanashi Jutta)
Voiced by: Takuya Eguchi
Jutta is Akira's younger brother. He sabotages Sanada and Akira's relationship out of possessiveness for Akira.
Mr. Sanada (真田先生, Sanada-sensei)
Voiced by: Daisuke Hirakawa
Sanada is Akira and Jutta's high school teacher. Despite his feelings for Akira, he rejects him to protect his future.

== Media ==
=== Manga ===
Originally titled Treat Me Gently, Please in Japan, the manga is written and illustrated by Yonezou Nekota. It was serialized in monthly manga magazine Magazine Be × Boy since 2006. The chapters were later released in 9 bound volume by Libre under the Be × Boy Comics imprint.

Nekota had originally published Don't Be Cruel in 2006 as a short story, which became the title work of an anthology that was published with several other unrelated short stories. Following the release of the book, Nekota then self-published several short sequels as dōjinshi, which were sold exclusively at Comiket. Afterwards, she published Don't Be Cruel: Plus+ in the March 2010 issue of B-Boy Cube and later decided to continue the main story. The first volume was reprinted with a new cover illustration in 2016. The dōjinshi were compiled and published in the volume version of Don't Be Cruel: Plus+.

Throughout the series' run, Frontier Works published a series of audio drama CDs. The first drama CD was released on October 22, 2008, and charted #219 on the Oricon Weekly Albums Chart. The second drama CD was released on December 24, 2014, and charted #154 on the Oricon Weekly Albums Chart. The third drama CD was released on November 28, 2018, with a special track included in the first press limited edition. The fourth drama CD was released on December 21, 2018.

In 2016, Viz Media licensed the series for North American distribution in English under their SuBLime imprint with the title Don't Be Cruel. The first four volumes were published as two 2-in-1 omnibus.

No.	Original release date	Original ISBN	English release date	English ISBN
1	January 10, 2007 (original release); October 8, 2016 (re-release)	978-4-8626-3101-5 (original release); ISBN 978-4-7997-3081-2 (re-release)	June 14, 2016 (omnibus)	978-1-4215-8697-7
2	October 9, 2010	978-4-8626-3851-9	June 14, 2016 (omnibus)	978-1-4215-8697-7
3	August 10, 2012	978-4-7997-1168-2	September 13, 2016 (omnibus)	978-1-4215-8698-4
4	December 10, 2013	978-4-7997-1396-9	September 13, 2016 (omnibus)	978-1-4215-8698-4
5	January 9, 2016	978-4-7997-2842-0	September 12, 2017	978-1-4215-9377-7
6	October 8, 2016	978-4-7997-3082-9	December 12, 2017	978-1-4215-9378-4
7	October 10, 2017	978-4-7997-3518-3	September 11, 2018	978-1-4215-9379-1
8	August 10, 2018	978-4-7997-3928-0	October 8, 2019	978-1-9747-0832-1
9	June 10, 2019	978-4-7997-4350-8	July 14, 2020	978-1-9747-1299-1
10	April 21, 2021	978-4-79-975212-8	July 12, 2022	978-1-9747-2526-7
11	March 10, 2022	978-4-79-975650-8	April 11, 2023	978-1-9747-3642-3

==== Side stories ====
No.	Title	Original release date	English release date
1	Don't Be Cruel: plus+ Hidoku Shinaide Plus+ (酷くしないでplus+)	August 13, 2013 (e-book); August 10, 2015 (print edition); 978-4-7997-2637-2 (print edition)	June 13, 2017; 978-1-4215-8700-4
2	Don't Be Cruel: plus+ Hidoku Shinaide Plus+ 2 (酷くしないでplus+ 2)	July 29, 2014 (e-book); August 10, 2015 (print edition); 978-4-7997-2637-2 (print edition)	June 13, 2017; 978-1-4215-8700-4
3	Don't Be Cruel: Akira Takanashi's Story; Hidoku Shinaide: Takanashi Akira-hen (酷くしないで 小鳥遊彰編)	December 10, 2014; 978-4-7997-2466-8	March 14, 2017; 978-1-4215-8699-1
4	Don't Be Cruel: Plus+ 3 Hidoku Shinaide Plus+ 3 (酷くしないでplus+ 3)	April 27, 2017	May 11, 2021; 978-1-9747-2227-3

==== Dōjinshi ====
Under the pseudonym "Komeya", Nekota has also self-published unofficial dōjinshi of the series and sold limited copies exclusively at Comiket. The Don't Be Gentle short stories were later compiled and officially released in Don't Be Cruel: Plus+.

No.	Title	Japanese release date	Japanese ISBN
1	Don't Be Gentle Chapter 1 Yasashiku Shinaide (優しくしないで)	August 12, 2006	—
2	Don't Be Gentle Chapter 2 Yasashiku Shinaide 2 (優しくしないで2)	December 2007	—
3	Don't Be Gentle Chapter 3 Yasashiku Shinaide 3 (優しくしないで 3)	August 17, 2008	—
4	Don't Be Gentle Chapter 4 Yasashiku Shinaide 4 (優しくしないで 4)	December 30, 2008	—
5	Shinaide Mix (しないでMIX)	August 16, 2009	—
6	Don't Be Gentle Chapter 5 Yasashiku Shinaide 5 (優しくしないで 5)	December 30, 2010	—
7	Don't Be Gentle Chapter 6 Yasashiku Shinaide 6 (優しくしないで 6)	December 30, 2011	—
8	Imasara Burīfu no Miryoku o Kizukimashita. (今さらブリーフの魅力に気づきました。)	December 20, 2012	—
9	Onsen Furagu Kaishū!! (おんせんフラグ回収！！)	December 30, 2013	—
10	Shinaide Mix 2	December 30, 2013	—
11	Boku no Kareshi Tonikaku Kawaii. (ぼくのカレシはとにかくかわいい。)	August 16, 2014	—
12	Nemugasa, Yopparau. (眠傘、酔っ払う。)	December 28, 2014	—
13	H: Ecchi	March 29, 2015	—
14	Boku no Burīfu ni Ana (ぼくのブリーフに穴)	August 15, 2015	—
15	Omocha ni Shinaide (おもちゃにしないで)	December 29, 2015	—
16	Shinaide Mix 3 (しないでMIX3)	August 12, 2016	—
17	Kimi de Hitori Asobi (君でひとり遊び)	August 12, 2017	—
18	On the Bed...	December 30, 2017	—
19	Akakute Oishii (あかくておいしい)	August 11, 2018	—
20	Ore datte Sonna Hi ga Aru. (俺だってそんな日がある。)	December 29, 2018	—
21	Kiss Me (Note: The cover lists the title as Please Kiss Me Once More, but the story itself is titled Kiss Me.)	August 10, 2019	—

== Reception ==
By August 2018, the series had sold a cumulative total of 1.4 million physical copies in Japan.

Rebecca Silverman from Anime News Network praised the story and artwork, but noted that the first two volumes bundled in the English omnibus were different in tone, with the first volume opening with non-consensual tropes while the second focusing on more emotional romance. Silverman also reviewed the story and artwork in Akira Takanashi's Story favorably, but felt uncomfortable with Jutta's non-consensual parts.
