= Hero Heel =

Japanese manga series

- Genre: Yaoi
- Manga
- Written by: Makoto Tateno
- Published by: Biblos (volume 1 only), Libre Publishing
- English publisher: NA: Digital Manga Publishing
- Magazine: Be × Boy Gold
- Original run: August 10, 2005 – March 10, 2007
- Volumes: 3

Hero Heel (HERO・HEEL -英雄と悪漢-, Hero Heel - Eiyū to Akkan) is a Japanese manga written and illustrated by Makoto Tateno. It is licensed in North America by Digital Manga Publishing, which released the manga through its imprint, Juné, on April 8, 2008. Biblos released the manga on August 10, 2005 before it went bankrupt in 2006. Libre Publishing took over publication in Japan and released the manga's three tankōbon between June 30, 2007, and March 10, 2007, publishing the last two volumes first then the first volume. The manga is licensed in Taiwan by Egmont Manga & Anime and in Germany by AnimePro.

== Reception ==
Mania.com's Julie Rosato comments the manga for its "juxtaposition of the themes of the TV show and the actions of the people who play the characters, because it's trying to ask us to determine what makes a hero and what a villain " and just who is which when the cameras stop rolling". Coolstreak Comics' Leroy Douresseaux comments on the author's artwork, saying "she's also able to draw skinny, pretty boys (with long, wavy hair) that honestly look masculine, even Masaki Minami when he's getting (essentially) raped!" A later review by Douresseaux comments on the author "whose work usually emphasizes an attention to detail in matters of love similar to that of a prose romance novel, gets in the heart and soul of those matters here – capturing a deeper sense of longing and yearning."
