= Sex Pistols (disambiguation) =

The Sex Pistols were an English punk rock band.

Sex Pistols may also refer to:

- Sex Pistols (box set), a 2002 anthology by the band
- Love Pistols, a Japanese yaoi manga series originally titled Sex Pistols
- In Golden Wind (manga), the character Guido Mista possesses a Stand known as Sex Pistols.
