= Caste Heaven =

Japanese manga series

- Cover of the Japanese version of vol. 1, first released on June 10, 2015

カーストヘヴン (Kāsuto Hevun)
- Genre: Boys' love
- Manga
- Written by: Chise Ogawa
- Published by: Libre
- English publisher: NA: SuBLime
- Imprint: BBC DX
- Magazine: Magazine Be × Boy
- Original run: March 2014 – September 2021
- Volumes: 8
- Video game

Caste Heaven for Ameba
- Developer: 1080 Lab
- Publisher: Ameba
- Genre: Dating sim
- Platform: iOS; Android
- Released: JP: April 23, 2019

Caste Heaven (Japanese: カーストヘヴン, Hepburn: Kāsuto Hevun; alternatively titled Heaven of School Caste in Japan) is a Japanese manga series written and illustrated by Chise Ogawa, the yaoi pseudonym of Shigeyoshi Takagi. It was serialized in the monthly yaoi manga magazine Magazine Be × Boy from March 2014 until September 2021. A mobile game based on the manga was released in 2019 in Japan.

== Plot ==
=== Setting ===
Each class at school is involved in a game that determines each individual's position in the caste system through picking up trump cards scattered throughout the campus. The King and Queen cards select the King and Queen of each class respectively, the top of the caste. The high tier consists of the Jack (Jack), Yes-Man (10), and Wannabes (9), who serve the King. The middle tier consists of the Preppies (8), Gofers (7), and Slackers (6). The low tier consists of the Geeks (5), the Goths (4), and the Brainiacs (3). The outside tier consists of the Freaks (2) and Delinquents (Ace). Students who draw the Joker, refuse to participate in the game, or inform the teachers are immediately turned into Targets and bullied.

=== Synopsis ===
Azusa is the King of his class, but during the caste reassignment, Karino betrays him, taking the King card for himself while assigning him the role of the Target. Azusa is forced to submit to Karino to avoid being assaulted by the class, but despite facing constant harassment and bullying, he is undeterred and fights back to regain his position. As Azusa learns more about Karino's background, other students, overcome with envy from their social statuses, form relationships ranging from love to hate with each other throughout the caste game.

== Characters ==
Yuya Azusa (梓 裕也, Azusa Yūya)
Voiced by: Yuma Uchida
Azusa is a student from class 2-1 who was initially a King but became a Target during the reshuffle. He lives with his single mother and is determined to take back his King position from Kohei. He hates being sympathized.
Kohei Karino (刈野 滉平, Karino Kōhei)
Voiced by: Yūki Ono
Karino is a student from class 2-1 who was initially a Wannabe but became a King during the reshuffle. Initially obedient to Azusa, his true personality is sadistic and controlling, which he reveals upon betraying him to become the King. He is the prime minister's son with a future already decided for him, and he looks at his school life as a way to pass his boredom. He is entertained by Azusa's unbreakable spirit and wants nothing more than to see him humiliated and helpless.
Atsumu Kusakabe (日下部 鐘, Kusakabe Atsumu)
Voiced by: Ayumu Murase
Atsumu is a student from class 2-1 who was initially a Target but became a Jack during the reshuffle. Quiet and shy, he was bullied at school since childhood and views Kuze as a prince. After realizing the extent of how much caste game has affected people's personalities, Atsumu opposes the game and tries to treat everyone equally outside of their rankings.
Natsuki Kuze (久世 那月, Kuze Natsuki)
Voiced by: Takuya Satō
Kuze is a student from class 2-1 who was initially a Jack but became a Preppy during the reshuffle. He is popular and comes from a rich family. Atsumu reminds him of a defenseless rabbit he cared for in elementary school that was later killed by other rabbits, and he becomes extremely protective of him as a result.
Yoichiro Tatsumi (巽 耀一郎, Tatsumi Yōichirō)
Voiced by: Junya Enoki
Tatsumi is a student from class 3-2 who was initially a Preppy but became a Delinquent during the reshuffle. He is the illegitimate son between Karino's father and his mistress, and he maintains good behavior, grades, and responsibility towards Karino in order for his mother to receive financial support. Through Senzaki, Tatsumi discovers he wants to be free, but he realizes he is still unable to choose between his family's expectations and his personal freedom. After Senzaki disappears from his life, Tatsumi awaits his return.
Kamo Senzaki (仙崎 鴨, Senzaki Kamo)
Voiced by: Makoto Furukawa
Senzaki is a student from class 3-2 who is a Delinquent before and after the reshuffle. He is feared by his classmates for having tattoos and a violent behavior, but he falls deeply in love with Tatsumi after the latter accepts him for who he is. He devotes all of himself to Tatsumi, but when he notices Tatsumi hesitates to reciprocate because of his family, he later stops attending school.
Yukari Osuga (大須賀 ゆかり, Ōsuga Yukari)
Voiced by: Kengo Kawanishi
Osuga is a student from class 2-1 who is a Wannabe before and after the reshuffle. He is concerned about his small body and wants to become stronger.
Keigo Yatori (八鳥 圭吾, Yatori Keigo)
Voiced by: Tarusuke Shingaki
Yatori is a student from class 2-1 who is a Gofer before and after the reshuffle. He is Osuga's childhood friend and is loyal to him.

== Media ==
=== Manga ===
Caste Heaven is written and illustrated by Chise Ogawa, the yaoi pseudonym of Shigeyoshi Takagi. It was serialized in monthly manga magazine Magazine Be × Boy from March 2014 to late 2021. The chapters were later released in 8 bound volumes by Libre under the BBC DX imprint.

A short story featuring Osuga and Yatori was published in the anthology Kuzu, which was released on February 29, 2016. A short story featuring Omi and Akio was published in the anthology Mesuochi BL, a part of Libre's X-BL anthology series, which was released on February 10, 2017. In addition, Ogawa sold an unofficial dōjinshi featuring Tamotsu Yoshinaga and Kento Megumi for Comiket 89 on December 29, 2015, and also posted it on her Pixiv account.

In August 2019, Viz Media licensed the series for North American distribution in English under their SuBLime imprint.

No.	Original release date	Original ISBN	English release date	English ISBN
1	June 10, 2015	978-4799725436	March 10, 2020	978-1974712458
Episode 1; Episode 2; Episode 3; Episode 4; Episode 5; Episode 6
2	May 10, 2016	978-4799729458	June 9, 2020	978-1974712465
Episode 7; Episode 8; Episode 9; Episode 10; Episode 11
3	June 9, 2017	978-4799733462	September 8, 2020	978-1974712472
Episode 12; Episode 13; Episode 14; Episode 15
4	September 10, 2018	978-4799740057	December 8, 2020	978-1974712489
Episode 16; Episode 17; Episode 18; Episode 19
5	July 10, 2019	978-4799743942	March 9, 2021	978-1974718801
Episode 20; Episode 21; Episode 22; Episode 23; Episode 24
6	April 10, 2020	978-4864363396	June 8, 2021	978-1974720903
Episode 25; Episode 26; Episode 27; Episode 28; Episode 29
7	May 10, 2021	978-4-79-975243-2	June 12, 2022	978-1-9747-2793-3
Episode 30; Episode 31; Episode 32; Episode 33; Episode 34
8	October 8, 2021	978-4-79-975458-0	January 10, 2023	978-1-9747-3413-9
Episode 35; Episode 36; Episode 37; Episode 38

=== Drama CDs ===
A drama CD adapting the first volume was announced on July 7, 2016, starring Yuma Uchida as Azusa and Yūki Ono as Karino, and was released on October 26, 2016. The first volume also included an original drama track titled "In the Middle of the Game" and peaked at #58 on the Oricon Weekly Album Rankings. The second drama CD, adapting the second volume of the manga, was announced on April 11, 2017, with the release of volume 3 of the manga. The second volume starred Ayumu Murase as Atsumu and Takuya Satō as Kuze. It was released on July 19, 2017, peaking at #100 on the Oricon Weekly Album Ranking. The third drama CD, adapting the third volume of the manga, was announced on September 10, 2018, with the release of volume 4 of the manga. The third volume starred Junya Enoki as Tatsumi and Makoto Furukawa as Senzaki. It was released on July 30, 2019, peaking at #82 on the Oricon Weekly Album Ranking.

=== Game ===
In January 2019, a dating sim game for iOS and Android was announced and later released in Japan on April 23, 2019. The game is developed by 1080 Lab for Ameba featuring multiple endings for each pairing. Chise Ogawa is supervising the scenarios and also wrote an original scenario for the game. The cast from the drama CD reprised their roles. A pop-up collaboration cafe was held from May 10 to May 26, 2019, at Area-Q Annex in Tokyo to promote the game.

== Reception ==
Caste Heaven has sold a cumulative total of 700,000 physical copies in Japan by the release of the sixth volume on April 10, 2020. Volume 1 peaked at #40 on Oricon and sold 15,978 physical copies on its first week of sales. Volume 2 peaked at #24 on Oricon and sold 23,445 physical copies on its first week of sales. Volume 3 peaked at #37 on Oricon and sold 17,010 physical copies on its first week of sales. Volume 4 peaked at #29 on Oricon and sold 21,089 physical copies on its first week of sales.

Anime News Network gave the first volume a low score, citing discomfort with conflating bullying and cruelty with sexiness, while stating Atsumu and Kuze's segments were more palatable.
