= His Favorite =

Japanese manga series

アイツの大本命 (Aitsu no Daihonmei)
- Genre: Comedy, Romance, boys' love
- Manga
- Written by: Suzuki Tanaka
- Published by: Libre Publishing
- English publisher: NA: SuBLime
- Magazine: Magazine Be × Boy
- Original run: 2008 – present
- Volumes: 14

His Favorite (アイツの大本命, Aitsu no Daihonmei) is a boys' love manga created by Suzuki Tanaka. The story follows Takahiko Satō, a handsome student that all the girls in his school idolize and adore, but who in turn has no real interest in them. He is in love with "his most favorite", Yoshio Yoshida, a fellow student who protected Satō from bullies when he was younger. However, as Yoshida is so close to Satō, all the girls at the school hate him. His Most Favorite was one of the first titles released in print by SuBLime, the yaoi imprint of Viz Media, under the title of His Favorite. In August 2015 it was announced that His Favorite would be adapted as a live-action TV series.

== Characters ==
- Takahiko Satō is a handsome student who is idolized by all the girls at his school. However, he has no interest in them and considers fellow student Yoshio Yoshida "his most favorite." Four years previously, Satō was bullied by other students because he was overweight, but Yoshida protected him. Satō's parents then sent him to a school in England which turned out to be a fat camp which forced pupils to lose weight by, among other things, fighting wild animals. There he lost weight, shot up in height, and became the attractive figure he is now. He dotes on Yoshida, but he also has a sadistic streak and likes to play with Yoshida's fears. He eventually reveals his relationship with Yoshida to the school, but this seems to have no effect on the girls chasing after him.
- Yoshio Yoshida is Satō's boyfriend. He is considered unattractive by their schoolmates because he is very short with an X-shaped scar on his face, which he got while protecting Satō in their younger days. All the girls who love Satō hate Yoshida for spending so much time so close to their idol. Yoshida often worries about concealing his romantic relationship with Satō and protests when Satō is too affectionate at school. He also tries to rein in some of Satō's sadistic tendencies toward others. He is easily scared of ghosts, the supernatural, and haunted houses. After his relationship with Satō is made public, he finds himself even more at odds with the girls who are after Satō.
- Hosaku Akimoto is one of Yoshida's friends. Unlike most of the male students he appears to be in a relationship, as he is seen dating his neighbour Yoko, although he insists they are just friends.
- Makimura is another of Yoshida's friends. Desperate to get a girlfriend, Makimura constantly fails, partly due to his appearance, having pimples on his face. He pursues a series of different girls, and particularly tries to win the affections of Machiko Arima.
- Yamanaka was once considered the second most popular boy at school, after Satō. He saw Satō as his rival for the favor of the girls at school. He made a pass at Yoshida to try to get at Satō, prompting Satō to strike back by spreading rumors that Yamanaka was a pervert, causing his popularity to fall. He is now in a new relationship with Torachin.
- Tsuyako Ijuin is a former member of the fat camp that Satō attended, the only other Japanese student there. Like Satō, she is also a sadist, though she remarks that Satō differs in his sadism because he is bored by people who obey him. Tsuyako is from a wealthy family and has odd ways of showing affection.
- The Nozawa Twins are an older sister and younger brother who represent the school's art club. Both of them often want to draw Yoshida and Satō, pestering them until they agree.
- Toranosuke "Torachin" Takahashi is a friend of Yoshida's since junior high school. His real name is Toranosuke, but he was nicknamed "Torachin" because there were two Toranosukes in their class. Similarly Torachin nicknamed Yoshida "Yoshi-Yoshi" because there were two Yoshidas in the class. He has difficulty attracting girls because he looks tough and intimidating, but later he seems to form a relationship with Yamanaka.
- Murakami becomes the second most popular guy in school after Yamanaka falls from grace. He secretly enjoys cross-dressing and thinks he makes a better-looking girl than any of the others at school.
- Seijuro Nishida is an openly gay student who's also in love with Yoshida. He appears to be Satō's opposite in character: Nishida is earnest, friendly, and helpful, even heroic. He and Satō battle over Yoshida, sometimes at school, which other students interpret as a comedy routine.
- Machiko Arima is the president of the student council who is also in love with Satō. She uses her position to organize events so that she has a chance of winning, where being alone with Satō is the main prize. Makimura is in love with her.
- Takeru Azuma is a male transfer student who used to be in a relationship with Nishida since the age of five. He is still in love with Nishida and thus considers Yoshida a rival for his affections. Satō thus tries to get Nishida to like Azuma again.

== Media ==
His Favorite began serialization in 2008. The first tankōbon volume was released in Japan by Libre Publishing on July 18, 2008. So far fourteen volumes have been published. The series was released in English by SuBLime, with the first volume being released on September 11, 2012. In August 2015 a series of live-action commercials were made to commemorate the release of the ninth volume. Kōta Torii played Yoshida, and Takeaki Isowa played Sato.

No.	Original release date	Original ISBN	English release date	English ISBN
1	July 18, 2008	9784862634337	September 11, 2012	9781421543512
"His Favorite—act. 1"; "His Favorite—act. 2"; "His Favorite—act. 3"; "His Favorite—act. 4"; "People-Pleaser"; "Trivial Trivia"; "Postscript"
2	February 10, 2009	9784862635396	December 11, 2012	9781421543529
"His Favorite—act. 5"; "His Favorite—act. 6"; "His Favorite—act. 7"; "A Turtle's Love Is Eternal"; "Love or Bust"; "In the Pursuit of Art"; "Postscript"
3	January 9, 2010	9784862637192	March 12, 2013	9781421543574
"His Favorite—act. 8"; "His Favorite—act. 9"; "His Favorite—act. 10"; "His Favorite—act. 11"; "His Favorite—act. 12"; "Good vs. Evil"; "Postscript"
4	December 10, 2010	9784862638816	June 11, 2012	9781421543581
"His Favorite—act. 13"; "His Favorite—act. 14"; "His Favorite—act. 15"; "His Favorite—act. 16"; "Postscript"
5	April 10, 2012	9784799711088	September 10, 2013	9781421555492
"His Favorite—act. 17"; "His Favorite—act. 18"; "His Favorite—act. 19"; "His Favorite—act. 20"; "His Favorite—act. 21"; "Postscript"
6	April 10, 2013	9784799713037	January 14, 2014	9781421543499
"His Favorite—act. 22"; "His Favorite—act. 23"; "His Favorite—act. 24"; "His Favorite—act. 25"; "His Favorite—act. 26"; "His Type"; "Postscript"
7	April 10, 2014	9784799714942	September 9, 2014	9781421558929
"His Favorite—act. 27"; "His Favorite—act. 28"; "His Favorite—act. 29"; "Postscript"
8	January 10, 2015	9784799724743	January 12, 2016	9781421584232
"His Favorite—act. 30"; "His Favorite—act. 31"; "His Favorite—act. 32"; "His Favorite—act. 33"; "Torachin and Yamanaka Update"; "Still Much Ado on the School Field Trip"; "Postscript"
9	September 10, 2015	9784799726587	June 14, 2016	9781421588551
"His Favorite—act. 34"; "His Favorite—act. 35"; "His Favorite—act. 36"; "His Favorite—act. 37"; "His Favorite—act. 38"; "After the Fireworks"; "Postscript"
10	December 10, 2016	9784799731642	January 9, 2018	9781421593715
"His Favorite—act. 39"; "His Favorite—act. 40"; "His Favorite—act. 41"; "Peaceful Everyday Life"
11	August 10, 2019	9784799744314	November 12, 2020	9781974715367
"His Favorite—act. 42"; "His Favorite—act. 43"; "His Favorite—act. 44"; "His Favorite—act. 45"; "His Favorite—act. 46"; "His Favorite—act. 47"; "His Favorite—act. 48"; "His Favorite—act. 48.5"; "School Trip Memories"; "Afterword"
12	April 9, 2021	9784799752098	May 10, 2022	9781974728923
"His Favorite—act. 49"; "His Favorite—act. 50"; "His Favorite—act. 51"; "His Favorite—act. 52"; "His Favorite—act. 53"; "His Favorite—act. 54"; "His Favorite—act. 55"; "They Ended Up Not Buying Any Sneakers"; "Afterword"
13	November 10, 2022	9784799760048	September 12, 2023	9781974740901
"His Favorite–act. 56"; "His Favorite–act. 57"; "His Favorite–act. 58"; "His Favorite–act. 59"; "His Favorite–act. 60"; "His Favorite–act. 61"; "The Hated Operetta"; "After the Festival"
14	January 16, 2025	9784799770443	April 16, 2026	9781974761289
"His Favorite–act. 62"; "His Favorite–act. 63"; "His Favorite–act. 64"; "His Favorite–act. 65"; "His Favorite–act. 66"; "His Favorite–act. 67"; "His Favorite–act. 68"; "His Favorite–act. 69"; "His Favorite–act. 70"; "His Favorite–act. 71"; "His Favorite–act. 72"; "A Memory of a Certain Day"

== Reception ==
Ian Wolf of MyM magazine praised His Most Favorite writing that: "One interesting aspect is that Yoshida is not conventionally attractive because of a scar on his face which would put some people off. However the humour is good and the chemistry between the two works well."

Shaenon K. Garrity, writing for Anime News Network, was mostly positive about the series. She praised the humour, the extended cast and the character development. Garrity however, also expressed annoyance for the lack of sex there was in His Most Favorite.
