= Menkui! =

Manga series

- First volume, English edition
- Genre: Yaoi
- Manga
- Written by: Suzuki Tanaka
- Published by: Biblos
- English publisher: NA: Blu Manga
- Magazine: Magazine Be × Boy
- Original run: July 2000 – June 10, 2003
- Volumes: 3

Menkui! (Japanese: メンクイ!; "Only Attracted to Good Looks") is a Japanese manga written and illustrated by Suzuki Tanaka. It is licensed in North America by Blu Manga, the yaoi imprint of Tokyopop, which released the manga between May 2006 and January 2007.

== Reception ==
Julie Rosato, reviewing the first volume for Mania Entertainment, enjoyed the chemistry between the characters, enjoying the "sweet high school romance" between the pair. Rosato recommended the volume to teens or people new to the boys love genre. A.E. Sparrow, writing for IGN, regarded the first volume of Menkui! as being "a pretty good primer on what this whole shonen-ai thing is all about". Sandra Scholes, reviewing the first volume for Active Anime, enjoyed the artwork and felt the story was interesting, and explained some Japanese terms and generally had humour. Katherine Farmar, writing for Comics Village, describes the main story as being "mostly plotless and very low-key", and regarded Tanaka's art style to be the main draw for this "deeply sweet" story. Casey Brienza, writing for Anime News Network, disliked the manga, saying it had "appalling stunted scope and pinched ambitions". Brienza felt that the main story employed several cliches, and then resorted to fantastic and science fiction elements to try to enliven the story. Brienza felt that the best point of the book was the "clean yet distinctively bold, confident style" of artwork which she regards as being reminiscent of shonen manga.
