= Kurashina Sensei's Passion =

Japanese manga series

- Genre: Yaoi
- Manga
- Written by: Natsuho Shino
- Published by: Biblos, Libre Publishing
- English publisher: NA: Digital Manga Publishing
- Magazine: Magazine Be × Boy
- Original run: October 9, 2004 – October 10, 2006
- Volumes: 5

Kurashina Sensei's Passion (倉科先生の受難, Kurashina Sensei no Junan) is a Japanese manga written and illustrated by Natsuho Shino. It is licensed in North America by Digital Manga Publishing, which released the first volume through its imprint June Manga, on 9 September 2009, the second volume on 16 December 2009, and the third volume 24 March 2010.

== Reception ==
Rachel Bentham felt all the characters were likeable, and enjoyed the "energy" of the first volume. Leroy Dessaroux enjoyed that the plot was character-driven. Connie C. felt that although the manga was "pleasant", that it broke no new ground, and that the characters were stereotypical. Matthew Warner felt that the characters seemed to have been left to develop in later volumes, but enjoyed the cliffhanger ending of the first volume.
