= Lovers in the Night =

Japanese manga

- Cover of the English edition

愛とは夜に気付くもの (Ai Towa Yoru ni Kizuku Mono)
- Genre: Yaoi, Romance, Historical
- Manga
- Written by: Fumi Yoshinaga
- Published by: Biblos, Libre Publishing
- English publisher: NA: Blu
- Magazine: Be × Boy Gold
- Published: March 1999
- Volumes: 1

Lovers in the Night (愛とは夜に気付くもの, Ai Towa Yoru ni Kizuku Mono) is a one-shot Japanese manga written and illustrated by Fumi Yoshinaga. Biblos released the manga in March 1999. Libre Publishing obtained the license in 2007 and released its own volume on January 4, 2007.

It is licensed and published in North America by Blu on May 8, 2007. The manga is licensed in Taiwan by Sharp Point Press.

== Reception ==
Coolstreak Cartoons's Leroy Douresseaux comments on how the "love between two people" takes priority over everything else in the manga. Pop Shock Culture's Katherine Dacey commends the manga for "emphasizing steamy encounters between beautiful men in period costume over long-winded political discussions". Mania.com's Nadia Oxford commends Fumi Yoshinaga's artwork but criticises the backgrounds that "remain disappointingly sparse".

== See also ==
- Truly Kindly - another anthology by Yoshinaga which contains a story about two of the characters from this book.
