= Kichiku Megane =

2007 adult visual novel game and its franchise

鬼畜眼鏡
- Genre: Boys' love
- Video game
- Developer: Spray
- Publisher: Visual Arts
- Genre: Visual novel
- Platform: Microsoft Windows
- Released: JP: July 20, 2007; (limited edition): JP: October 12, 2007; (standard edition)
- Novel
- Written by: Tamami
- Illustrated by: Fuhri Misasagi
- Published by: Libre Publishing
- Imprint: B-Boy Slash Novels
- Manga
- Written by: Fuhri Misasagi
- Published by: Libre Publishing
- Imprint: Super BBC
- Magazine: Magazine Be × Boy
- Original run: September 7, 2007 – 2012
- Volumes: 5
- Video game

Kichiku Megane R
- Developer: Spray
- Publisher: Visual Arts
- Genre: Visual novel
- Platform: Microsoft Windows
- Released: JP: March 27, 2009; (limited edition): JP: February 5, 2010; (standard edition)

Kichiku Megane (鬼畜眼鏡; lit. "Sadistic Glasses") is a Japanese adult visual novel created by Spray and published by Visual Arts for Microsoft Windows. The game was first released as a limited edition bundle on July 20, 2007, before later seeing a general release on October 12, 2007. A fan disc sequel titled Kichiku Megane R was later released for Microsoft Windows, with the limited edition released on March 27, 2009, and the standard version released on February 5, 2010.

Since the release of Kichiku Megane, several novel and manga adaptations written by the original staff of the game have been released. In addition, several original audio dramas were released on CD.

== Plot ==
Katsuya Saeki is a 25-year-old unsuccessful salaryman working in a marketing subsidiary of a pharmaceutical company whose division is at risk of being laid off. Weak-willed and shy, one evening, he comes across Mr. R, who gives him a pair of glasses that he claims to change his life. When Katsuya wears the glasses, he becomes confident and domineering, but the more he wears them, the more brutal and sadistic he becomes. The endings that the player achieves depend on which character is selected as Katsuya's love interest, whether Katsuya keeps wearing the glasses, and other choices made throughout the game.

== Characters ==
Katsuya Saeki (佐伯 克哉, Saeki Katsuya)
Voiced by: Tatsuya Hirai
Katsuya is a 25-year-old office employee who has been working for three years in 8th department of Kikuchi Marketing, a subsidiary of the pharmaceutical company MGN. In the past, he also played volleyball. While weak-willed and shy in his normal form, when he wears the sadistic glasses, his personality instantly changes to confident and commanding. Without glasses, Katsuya plays the uke in a relationship, while wearing glasses, he plays the seme. Tatsuya Hirai, who provided Katsuya's voice, noted that Katsuya's personalities vary depending on what relationship he is experiencing.
Takanori Mido (御堂 孝典, Midō Takanori)
Voiced by: Yōji Asano
Mido is a 32-year-old office employee working as the director of the product development department of MGN. Having climbed up to a high position with exceptional speed at a young age, Mido is a perfectionist. He is the project manager of a new product sales campaign that is being developed by the 8th department of Kikuchi Marketing.
Kenji Honda (本多 憲二, Honda Kenji)
Voiced by: Chūsuke Inuno
Honda is a 25-year-old office employee working in the same department as Katsuya, and the two have been friends since college. He is athletic and was the captain of his volleyball team, with a promising career in sports. He is working hard to ensure that the 8th department will not be laid off.
Minoru Katagiri (片桐 稔, Katagiri Minoru)
Voiced by: Takaya Yukamaramu
Katagiri is a 43-year-old office employee and the manager of Katsuya's department. He used to be married with children but has since divorced and currently lives alone with his two cockatiels, Montenmaru and Shizukagozen. He is available as a love interest if Katsuya is wearing his glasses.
Taichi Igarashi (五十嵐 太一, Igarashi Taichi)
Voiced by: Keizō Ōishi
Taichi is a 21-year-old college student working part-time at Café Lloyd, a coffee shop near Katsuya's apartment. He is easygoing and listens attentively to Katsuya. He is available as a love interest if Katsuya is not wearing his glasses.
Aki Suhara (須原 秋紀, Suhara Aki)
Voiced by: Wataru Kaibara
Aki is an attractive boy who slept with Katsuya on the first night he wore the glasses. Unable to forget their first meeting, Katsuya looks for him in the city and at clubs. Aki is then taken in to live with Katsuya as his "pet cat." He is available as a love interest if Katsuya is wearing his glasses.
Mr. R
Voiced by: Renaissance Yamada
Mr. R is a mysterious man whom Katsuya meets one evening at a park near his office building, and is the one who gave him the glasses.

== Media ==
=== Video game ===
Kichiku Megane is created by Spray and published by Visual Arts for Microsoft Windows. The game was first released as a limited edition bundle on July 20, 2007, before later seeing a general release on October 12, 2007. The game's theme song is "Under the Darkness", which briefly went viral on Nicovideo for its mondegreen lyrics. The game was followed by the fan disc sequel Kichiku Megane R, with the limited edition released on March 27, 2009, and the standard version released on February 5, 2010. Aside from the story mode, Kichiku Megane R includes a typing game titled Kichiku Da (鬼畜打; lit. "Sadistic Typing"), where salacious phrases are typed under a time limit to cause a selected character to go into various states of undress.

=== Novels ===
A novel adaptation of the same is written by Tamami, the writer of the original game. Fuhri Misasagi, who provided artwork to the game, also provided illustrations for the novel. The books were published by Libre Publishing under the B-Boy Slash Novels imprint.

| No. | Title | Japanese release date | Japanese ISBN |
|---|---|---|---|
| 1 | Kichiku Megane (鬼畜眼鏡) | February 19, 2008 | 978-4862633491 |
| 2 | Kichiku Megane: Kichiku Katsuya & Midō-hen (鬼畜眼鏡 鬼畜克哉×御堂編) | May 19, 2010 | 978-4862637710 |

=== Manga ===
==== Main adaptation ====
A manga adaptation is written and illustrated by Fuhri Misasagi. It was serialized in the monthly boys' love manga magazine Magazine Be × Boy beginning with the October 2007 issue released on September 7, 2007. It was later compiled in four bound volumes by Libre Publishing under the Super BBC imprint. In 2019, Hifumi Store exclusively published a compilation of all the unofficial dōjinshi that Misasagi had created and sold at events over the years.

| No. | Title | Japanese release date | Japanese ISBN |
|---|---|---|---|
| 1 | Kichiku Megane: Katsuya & Midō-hen (鬼畜眼鏡-克哉×御堂編-) | August 9, 2008 | 978-4862634467 |
| 2 | Kichiku Megane: Honda & Katsuya-hen (鬼畜眼鏡-本多×克哉編-) | May 10, 2010 | 978-4862637802 |
| 3 | Kichiku Megane: Midō & Katsuya-hen (鬼畜眼鏡-御堂×克哉編-) | October 8, 2011 | 978-4799710470 |
| 4 | Kichiku Megane: Zen Kappuringu Mōra-hen (鬼畜眼鏡 全カップリング網羅編) | October 10, 2012 | 978-4799712078 |
| 5 | Kichiku Megane Another: Misasagi Fūri Dōjinshi Saisenshū (鬼畜眼鏡 Another みささぎ楓李 同人誌再録集) | August 28, 2019 | 978-4891995720 |

==== Anthologies ====
In 2009, Libre Publishing released an official comic anthology under the F'packs imprint.

| No. | Title | Japanese release date | Japanese ISBN |
|---|---|---|---|
| 1 | Kichiku Megane: Kōnin Komikku Ansorojii (鬼畜眼鏡公認コミックアンソロジー) | February 1, 2009 | 978-4862635457 |

==== Other ====
In 2013, Ohzora Publishing released a 4-panel comic illustrated by Io Kazuki under the Missy Comics imprint.

| No. | Title | Japanese release date | Japanese ISBN |
|---|---|---|---|
| 1 | Kichiku Megane Yonkoma: Tobidase Megane Paradaisu (鬼畜眼鏡4コマ 飛び出せMEGANEパラダイス) | August 28, 2013 | 978-4862637802 |

== Discography ==
=== Audio drama albums ===
Two original audio dramas were released on CD in 2007, with one version focusing on Katsuya's personality with his glasses on and the other without his glasses. Following the release of Kichiku Megane R in 2009, a second series of audio drama CDs were released, with all scenarios written by the scenario writer of Kichiku Megane R, Tamami. Team Entertainment pre-released the drama CD Kichiku Megane de "Yuku Nen Kuru Nen": Katsuya & Honda-hen at their booth at Comic Market 79 from December 29 to December 31, 2010.

List of albums, with selected chart positions, sales figures, and certifications
| Title | Year | Details | Peak chart positions | Sales |
| Title | Year | Details | JPN | Sales |
|---|---|---|---|---|
| Kichiku Megane Drama CD: Megane Sōchaku-ban | 2007 | Released: November 28, 2007; Label: Team Entertainment; Format: CD | 90 | — |
| Kichiku Megane Drama CD: Megane Hisōchaku-ban | 2007 | Released: December 26, 2007; Label: Team Entertainment; Format: CD | 147 | — |
| Kichiku Megane Drama CD: Megane Sōchaku-ban II | 2010 | Released: June 9, 2010; Label: Team Entertainment; Format: CD | 36 | — |
| Kichiku Megane Drama CD: Megane Hisōchaku-ban II | 2010 | Released: July 14, 2010; Label: Team Entertainment; Format: CD | 32 | — |
| Kichiku Megane Drama CD: Zakuro-ban | 2010 | Released: August 18, 2010; Label: Team Entertainment; Format: CD | 34 | — |
| Kichiku Megane de "Yuku Nen Kuru Nen": Katsuya & Honda-hen | 2011 | Released: January 5, 2011; Label: Team Entertainment; Format: CD | 211 | — |
"—" denotes releases that did not chart or were not released in that region.

=== Soundtrack ===
List of albums, with selected chart positions, sales figures, and certifications
| Title | Year | Details | Peak chart positions | Sales |
| Title | Year | Details | JPN | Sales |
|---|---|---|---|---|
| Kichiku Megane OST | 2007 | Released: October 18, 2007; Label: —; Format: CD | — | — |
| Contrast: Katsuya Saeki (Kichiku Megane) Character Song CD | 2008 | Released: September 17, 2008; Label: Team Entertainment; Format: CD | 51 | — |
"—" denotes releases that did not chart or were not released in that region.
