= Play Boy Blues =

Japanese manga series

- Genre: Yaoi
- Manga
- Written by: Shiuko Kano
- Published by: Biblos; Libre Publishing
- English publisher: NA: Central Park Media
- Magazine: Be × Boy Gold
- Original run: 2003 – 2008
- Volumes: 3

Play Boy Blues is a manga by Shiuko Kano. It was licensed in English by Central Park Media, which published the first volume under its Be Beautiful imprint on August 2, 2006. In Spain, Ediciones La Cúpula published the first volume in 2005.

== Reception ==
Kat Avila, writing for Sequential Tart, enjoyed Kano's "inventive" layouts and noted that Kano was developing her style throughout the book, and enjoyed the "refreshingly forceful masculine energy" of the lead characters and the playful plotline. Julie Rosato, for Mania Entertainment, felt that the characters weren't emotionally connected to each other and that she could not connect to the characters, as she felt the plot was largely "yeah, yeah, just skip to the sex".
