= Selfish Love =

Selfish Love may refer to:

- Selfish Love (manga), 2004
- "Selfish Love" (Jessie Ware song), 2017
- "Selfish Love" (DJ Snake and Selena Gomez song), 2021
- "Selfish Love", a song by Mabel from the album High Expectations, 2019
