= A Strange and Mystifying Story =

Japanese manga series

- Cover of the first volume of A Strange and Mystifying Story as published by Libre Publishing

この世異聞 (Kono Yo Ibun)
- Genre: Fantasy, Yaoi
- Manga
- Written by: Tsuta Suzuki
- Published by: Libre Publishing
- English publisher: NA: SuBLime (current) Digital Manga Publishing (former)
- Imprint: Be × Boy Comics
- Magazine: Magazine Be × Boy
- Published: May 2005 – 7 November 2012
- Volumes: 7

A Strange and Mystifying Story (Japanese: この世異聞, Hepburn: Kono Yo Ibun) is a Japanese manga written and illustrated by Tsuta Suzuki. The manga was published by Libre Publishing. It was initially licensed in North America by Digital Manga Publishing, which released the first three volumes through its imprint, Juné. After Libre ended its publishing agreement with Digital Manga Publishing in 2016, the manga was licensed in 2017 by Viz Media under its Boys' Love imprint, SuBLime.

== Plot ==
The manga is about a man who is sick with a disease cursed to affect all of his bloodline who summons a therianthrope, his family's guardian, to heal him.

== Media ==
=== Volume list ===
No.	Original release date	Original ISBN	English release date	English ISBN
1	10 November 2006	978-4-8626-3058-2	27 May 2008 (Juné); 14 November 2017 (SuBLime)	978-1-5697-0717-3 (Juné); ISBN 978-1-4215-9595-5 (SuBLime)
2	10 August 2007	978-4-8626-3241-8	19 August 2009 (Juné); 13 February 2017(SuBLime)	978-1-56970-130-0 (Juné); ISBN 978-1-4215-9596-2 (SuBLime)
3	9 May 2009	978-4-8626-3591-4	19 September 2011 (Juné); 8 May 2018(SuBLime)	978-1-56970-227-7 (Juné); ISBN 978-1-4215-9597-9 (SuBLime)
4	9 July 2010	978-4-8626-3799-4	14 August 2018 (SuBLime)	978-1-4215-9598-6 (SuBLime)
5	10 October 2011	978-4-7997-1030-2	13 November 2018 (SuBLime)	978-1-4215-9599-3 (SuBLime)
6	10 October 2012	978-4-7997-1206-1	12 February 2019 (SuBLime)	978-1-4215-9600-6 (SuBLime)
7	10 May 2013	978-4-7997-1493-5	14 May 2019 (SuBLime)	978-1-4215-9601-3 (SuBLime)

== Reception ==
Holly Ellingwood of ActiveAnime praised the 'quite striking' design of the therianthrope, and enjoyed his background story in the second volume. Michelle Smith found the background story incongruous with the otherwise "crude" presentation of the therianthrope in the rest of the series. Leroy Douresseaux praises the "slow burn", the "anticipation of consummation" in the work, and compares the story to Danielle Steel's fiction. Danielle van Gorder praised the character development, especially of the secondary characters, and the manga artist's easily distinguishable character designs. Van Gorder found the second volume "a bit disjointed", as it jumps around in time, showing the progress of the characters' relationship.
