= ...But, I'm Your Teacher =

Japanese manga series

- Cover of the original Biblos release of ...But, I'm Your Teacher

生徒の主張 教師の本分 (Seito no Shucho Kyoshi no Honbun)
- Genre: Romance, Yaoi
- Manga
- Written by: Row Takakura
- Published by: Biblos, Enterbrain
- English publisher: NA: Kitty Media
- Magazine: Magazine Be × Boy
- Published: 2001
- Volumes: 1

...But, I'm Your Teacher (Japanese: 生徒の主張 教師の本分, Hepburn: Seito no Shucho Kyoshi no Honbun) is a yaoi manga series written and illustrated by Row Takakura. Seven individual chapters were published as a single tankōbon volume in July 2001 by Biblos, then reprinted in March 2007 by Enterbrain which had assumed the license. The volume presents six short stories, with the titular story featuring Yahiro, a substitute teacher, who begins having an affair with his student Kago.

The volume is licensed for an English language release in North America by Media Blasters, which released in April 2006. It is licensed in French by Asuka, under the title Student Affair.

== Plot ==
Yahiro is a young man who struggles to find stable work as a teacher and eventually accepts a temporary teaching position at an all-boys college. On his very first day, one of his students, Koga, suddenly confesses that he is in love with him. Yahiro initially tries to maintain professional distance and treat Koga strictly as a student, but Koga continues to openly pursue him. The story follows their complicated relationship as they navigate the boundaries between teacher and student, adulthood and youth, and the social and professional consequences of their relationship.

== Media ==
Written and illustrated by Row Takakura, the seven chapters of ...But, I'm Your Teacher were serialized in Be x Boy in 1997, before being published in a single tankōbon volume in July 2001 by Biblos. Biblos declared bankruptcy in 2006, and the title was acquired by Enterbrain which reprinted the volume with new cover art on March 15, 2007, under their B's Lovey label.

In 2005, Media Blasters licensed the volume for an English language release in North America under its "Kitty Media" label; the volume was published on April 26, 2006. After the title moved from Biblos to Enterbrain, Kitty Media noted that when their current licensed expired, they would seek to renew with the new property holder.
