= You Make My Head Spin! =

Japanese one-shot manga

- You Make My Head Spin! as published by Biblos.

世界はテメェでまわってる (Sekai wa Temee de Mawatteru)
- Genre: Yaoi
- Manga
- Written by: Kazuhiko Mishima
- Published by: Biblos
- English publisher: NA: Digital Manga Publishing
- Magazine: Magazine Be × Boy
- Published: May 10, 2007
- Volumes: 1

You Make My Head Spin (Japanese: 世界はテメェでまわってる, Hepburn: Sekai wa Temee de Mawatteru) is a one-shot Japanese manga written and illustrated by Kazuhiko Mishima. It is serialized in Biblos's manga magazine, Be x Boy , collected in four chapters. It is licensed in North America by Digital Manga Publishing, which released the manga through its imprint, Juné, on September 9, 2008.

== Reception ==
ActiveAnime's Holly Ellingwood commends the manga as "one of the most hilarious yaoi romantic comedies in manga". Coolstreak Comics' Leroy Douresseaux comments that the bonus story is "Sensei" "is sweet, charming, and almost too sentimental to be included with the lustier You Make My Head Spin." Mania.com's Danielle van Gorder comments that Shindou's "deadpan declarations, complete with sparkles, were just so absurd that I couldn't help but laugh." She also commends the manga's art, saying, "the art here is heavy on the sharp, crisp lines, very precise and clean. Other than some screentone, shading is limited to hatching with those same crisp lines. It's a look that works very well, even with the relatively basic page layouts. The character designs are nicely distinct, especially the side characters. The character eyes especially are very well done".
