= Magazine Be × Boy =

Japanese manga magazine

- Categories: Boys' love
- Frequency: Monthly
- Publisher: Libre (formerly Biblos)
- First issue: March 1993
- Company: Animate (formerly Hekitensha)
- Country: Japan
- Language: Japanese
- Website: www.b-boy.jp

Magazine Be × Boy (月刊マガジンビーボーイ, Gekkan Magajin Bī Bōi) is a monthly Japanese boys' love manga magazine published by Libre. The magazine was originally launched by Biblos under the publisher Hekitensha in March 1993 until Biblos' bankruptcy in 2006.

== Publications ==
In addition to Magazine Be × Boy, several ongoing and defunct spin-off magazines have been published under the Be × Boy brand.

| Start | End | Name | Status | Frequency | Type | Notes |
|---|---|---|---|---|---|---|
| 1993 | —N/a | Magazine Be × Boy | Active | Monthly | Print | Flagship publication |
| 1992 | 2022 | Shosetsu B-Boy (小説ビーボーイ) | Defunct | Monthly | Print | Light novel magazine; launched in 1995 by Biblos, relaunched under Libre in June 2006 as special issues in Be × Boy Gold |
| 1995 | —N/a | Be × Boy Gold | Active | Bi-monthly | Print | Publishes explicit manga and short stories; launched in 1995 by Biblos, relaunched under Libre in 2006 |
| 2008 | 2015 | Junk! Boy | Defunct | Semi-yearly | Print | Originally titled Junk! by Biblos; relaunched in 2008 by Libre under the title Junk! Boy. Titles transferred to Magazine Be × Boy after final issue |
| 2009 | 2018 | B-Boy Cube (b－boyキューブ) | Defunct | Semi-yearly | Digital | |
| 2013 | —N/a | B-Boy P! (ビーボーイP！) | Active | Monthly | Digital | Published through Pixiv Comic. |
| 2016 | 2022 | B-Boy Omegaverse (b-boyオメガバース) | Defunct | Monthly | Digital | Omegaverse magazine; launched as a series of semi-monthly anthologies in 2016, relaunched as monthly digital magazine on June 20, 2019 |

== Serializations ==
=== Be × Boy ===
==== Current ====
- Love Pistols (2003–2006)
- Don't Be Cruel (2006–present)
- His Favorite (2008–present)
- Dakaichi (2013–present)
- 10 Things I Want to Do Before I Turn 40 (2022–present)

==== Former ====
- Kizuna: Bonds of Love (1992–2008)
- Level C (1993–1996)
- Fake (1994–2000)
- Love Mode (1995–2003)
- Truly Kindly (1997)
- Ichigenme... The First Class is Civil Law (1998–2002)
- Until the Full Moon (1998)
- Menkui! (2000–2003)
- Our Kingdom (2000–2007)
- ...But, I'm Your Teacher (2001)
- Close the Last Door (2001–2004)
- Yellow (2001–2004)
- Wild Rock (2002)
- Black Knight (2003–2005)
- Bond(z) (2003)
- Cut (2003)
- Golden Cain (2003)
- Awkward Silence (2004–2016)
- Gakuen Heaven (2004)
- Kurashina Sensei's Passion (2004–2006)
- Man's Best Friend (2004–2007)
- Selfish Love (2004)
- Shinobu Kokoro: Hidden Heart (2004)
- Clan of the Nakagamis (2005)
- The Sky Over My Spectacles (2005)
- A Strange and Mystifying Story (2005–2012)
- Love Control (2006–2024)
- Loving Gaze (2006)
- Necratoholic (2006)
- Alcohol, Shirt and Kiss (2007)
- Cause of My Teacher (2007)
- Hey, Sensei? (2007)
- You Make My Head Spin! (2007)
- Kichiku Megane (2007–2012)
- Repeat After Me? (2008–2009)
- Prince of Recipe (2012–2013)
- The Night Beyond the Tricornered Window (2013–2020)
- Caste Heaven (2014–2021)
- Barbarities (2014-2021)
- Cosmetic Playlover (2017–2025)
- Bitterness Playlover (2018–2025)
- Twilight Playlover (2020-2021)

=== Be × Boy Gold ===
==== Current ====
- Finder (2002–present)

==== Former ====
- Embracing Love (1999–2009)
- Lovers in the Night (1999)
- Gerard & Jacques (2000–2001)
- Hybrid Child (2003–2005)
- Play Boy Blues (2003–2008)
- Hero Heel (2005–2007)
- The Devil's Secret (2007)
- Links (2014)

=== B-Boy P! ===
==== Current ====
- Mr. Unlucky Has No Choice But to Kiss! (2019–present)
- Mask Danshi: This Shouldn't Lead to Love (2019–present)
