= Yuki Shimizu =

Japanese manga artist

Yuki Shimizu (志水ゆき, Shimizu Yuki) is a Japanese manga artist who writes in the yaoi (boys' love) genre. Her major works include Love Mode and ZE. Shimiizu also worked on the Manga Dear+ Ze from 2004 to 2011 which was released in 11 books in English.
