= Our Everlasting =

Manga series

形而上なぼくら (Keijijou na Bokura)
- Genre: Yaoi
- Manga
- Written by: Toko Kawai
- Published by: Biblos
- English publisher: NA: Digital Manga Publishing
- Original run: March 2000 – March 2001
- Volumes: 2

Our Everlasting (形而上なぼくら, Keijijou na Bokura) is a yaoi manga series by Toko Kawai published by Biblos and licensed by Digital Manga Publishing.

== Plot ==
Surfer dude Houryu and shy intellectual Shouin are very much in love. Their days together are filled with happiness, but when Shouin's French tutor - a handsome and openly gay man named Nanami - makes his affection for Shouin known, doubts begin to surface between the couple. Houryu begins to believe Nanami's theory that Houryu is at heart a straight man and will turn to a woman when his experimentation period with Shouin is over.
