= Ze (manga) =

Japanese manga series

- Cover of the first volume of the manga Ze by Yuki Shimizu, as published by Shinshokan in 2004

是
- Genre: Yaoi
- Manga
- Written by: Yuki Shimizu
- Published by: Shinshokan
- English publisher: 801 Media
- Magazine: Dear+
- Original run: 2004 – 2011
- Volumes: 11

Ze (是ーZEー) is a yaoi manga series by Yuki Shimizu. It is published in Japanese by Shinshokan and in English by 801 Media. It has been adapted into a drama CD.

== Plot ==
Shichikawa Raizô is a student who, after the death of his grandmother, who was his only family, finds himself living in a large house that is as unfamiliar to him as its occupants. He meets the other tenants, each stranger than the last. But there's one boy in particular, whose even stranger to him. His name is Kon, and for the time being, Raizô will have to share a room with him. As an apprentice cook, Raizô will be in charge of preparing meals for the whole house, and he'll be putting all his heart and soul into making sure everyone likes him. But it's going to be a long, hard road, especially in a house where some people appear mysteriously, as if straight out of an old Japanese tale, and others spend their time satisfying each other's carnal desires. But Raizô decides to stay to protect Kon, who, unlike the others, is always alone and seems to be much more fragile and cute than he lets on.

== Volume list ==
No.	Original release date	Original ISBN	English release date	English ISBN
1	December 20, 2004	4-403-66099-1	February 11, 2009	9781934129326
2	August 27, 2005	4-403-66118-1	April 8, 2009	9781934129333
3	February 25, 2006	4-403-66133-5	August 5, 2009	9781934129340
4	October 27, 2006	4-403-66154-8	March 20, 2010	9781934129357
5	June 30, 2007	978-4-403-66172-3	June 23, 2010	9781934129364
6	December 20, 2007	978-4-403-66189-1	February 1, 2011	9781934129371
7	October 27, 2008	978-4-403-66227-0	September 25, 2013	9781934129692
8	July 28, 2009	978-4-403-66252-2	March 26, 2014; April 8, 2014	9781934129708
9	March 30, 2010	978-4-403-66271-3	August 27, 2014; October 7, 2014	9781934129821
10	December 29, 2010	978-4-403-66295-9	January 28, 2015	9781934129838
11	July 30, 2011	978-4-403-66317-8	May 27, 2015	9781934129845

== Reception ==
"The art conveys that ZE is tense and dramatic without being overly melodramatic, and the story emphasizes character over sex as much as any other yaoi I’ve ever read." — Leroy Douresseaux, Comic Book Bin. "While ZE has its flaws, I ultimately found it to be enjoyable and thought it improved in the second volume." — Michelle Smith, Pop Culture Shock. "The art style is engaging, with varied characters, and fun. It’s deliciously risqué but doesn’t sacrifice the tenderness between characters either when the moment turns romantic and not only erotic." — Rachel Bentham, activeAnime.
