= Love Mode =

Japanese manga series

- Sakashita Izumi, Takamiya Katsura, Aoe Reiji, and Shirakawa Naoya
- Genre: Yaoi, Comedy, Drama, Romance
- Manga
- Written by: Yuki Shimizu
- Published by: Biblos
- English publisher: NA: BLU
- Magazine: Magazine Be × Boy
- Original run: 1995 – 2003
- Volumes: 11

Love Mode is a yaoi manga series by Yuki Shimizu.

It was first serialized in the Japanese monthly yaoi magazine Be x Boy in 1995 and released in 11 individual paperback volumes by the now-defunct publisher Biblos. The series was also published in English by BLU, an imprint of Tokyopop.

In addition, seven volumes of drama CDs have been released, with one of them Love Mode: Host Hen covering the story in volumes 6 and 7; Fly Me To Heaven, Thunder Honey and 'Sweet Trap.

== Plot ==
Love Mode itself is a compilation of several stories (most often short) involving various degrees of gay couples. Every one of these couples is linked to an establishment known as the Blue Boy. The Blue Boy is a gay host club where anyone wielding enough money can hire out a very attractive man either to pretty up a party or for sex. Most of the couples consist of either hosts/ex-hosts, clients/ex-clients, or both.

Though all of the couples get a considerable amount of spotlight, without a doubt, the main focus of the story is the once dysfunctional Aoe family and their lovers. Aoe Reiji himself owns the Blue Boy and is the only main character to appear in all eleven volumes.

== Characters ==
Sakashita Izumi
Sixteen years old, first appearance: Volume 1. Izumi was an average high school kid interested in meeting girls. He is set up on a blind date, thus meeting Takamiya Katsura, a handsome, older man. Izumi tries to back out, but he finds himself going out with Takamiya anyway and actually enjoying himself. As it would turn out, Takamiya was originally supposed to meet another person also named “Izumi” from a high-class gay dating club. Although Izumi opposes the idea of a homosexual relationship throughout most of the first volume, he finds himself slowly falling for Takamiya and eventually comes to terms with himself, loving Takamiya for the person he is. Still, Izumi is rather skittish about his relationship with Takamiya and often rejects the older man's advances.
Takamiya Katsura
Twenty-eight years old, first appearance: Volume 1. He first met Sakashita Izumi when he was originally supposed to meet Yanase Izumi (see below), but fell in love the high schooler anyway. He is very kind, gentle, considerate, cares about Izumi's feelings, and is enthusiastic to win Izumi's heart. Although he often pushes his young lover's boundaries, he doesn't violate them. In a poll once hosted by Biblos, Takamiya got the most votes for someone female readers would want to marry. He and Reiji met while in college in England.
Aoe Reiji
Twenty-eight years old, turns twenty-nine at the end of Volume 7, first appearance: Volume 1. He's the owner of several establishments and businesses, including the Blue Boy, the gay dating club responsible for Izumi and Takamiya's happiness together. He's also a long-time friend of Takamiya's. Aoe is work-obsessed and often cold to those around him (particularly Izumi), but his actions and words always mean well. Reiji himself had topped the polls for the favorite seme in Biblos during Love Mode's run.
Shirakawa Naoya
First appearance: Volume 2. Orphaned at a young age when his parents died in an auto accident (a traumatic experience that haunted him for years), he was taken in by Aoe Reiji, “out of kindness.” As a result of Aoe's charity, he fell in love with the older man. Naoya is well obedient to Aoe, and his brother Kiichi (see below). Naoya is often referred to as a cat or a stray (he also adopted a kitten Gyoku), known simply as the 'kitten' when people talk about Reiji's lover.
Yanase Izumi
First appearance: Volume 1. The “other” Izumi Takamiya was supposed to meet with from Aoe's club. He's tender and soft-spoken. He has a very troubled past: He was brutally raped at the age of thirteen because his parents couldn't repay a yakuza debt. He meets and falls in love with Arashi (see below), but couldn't decide if he could fully express himself to him because he feared Arashi's family couldn't cope with their gay son, and because of his past. Due to his health problems and his falling in love with Arashi, Izumi retires from Blue Boy.
Iketani Arashi
First appearance: Volume 3. He's a carefree, laid-back, playful high schooler who thinks Yanase Izumi is cute, even though he's a guy. Even after learning of Izumi's troubled past, he lets Izumi know he doesn't care about it and that he loves Izumi for who he is now, and even offers himself to ease the pain.
Aoe Kiichi
Thirty-one years old, first appearance: volume 2. A doctor, Aoe Reiji's elder brother, the self-professed "Queen of Aoe", and a close friend of Yanase Izumi and Naoya, both of whom he tenderly endears. He thinks of Naoya as a little brother. Kiichi is always concerned about Reiji, and is often overly nosy and pries into his brother's business, especially where his love life with Naoya is concerned. He's playful, too. He's the one who came up with the kitten nickname for Naoya. He served once as doctors to both Yanase Izumi and Saginuma Tomoki.
Kashima Haruomi
Twenty-eight years old, first appearance: volume 3. He is the adopted, elder brother of Kashima Shuei (see below), current housekeeper of “Aoe,” and Kiichi's personal bodyguard and lover. He was prepared for his position since childhood, as he learned several kinds of martial arts and other essential abilities (it's somewhat of a tradition for any member of “Aoe”). Haroumi is generally calm and solemn, in contrast to Shuei. Haruomi also has a twin younger brother whom he was separated from when he was adopted into the Kashima family.
Kashima Shuei
Twenty-seven years old, first appearance: Volume 2. He is Aoe Reiji's personal secretary, and works for the “Aoe” house, like Haruomi. He's one of the most carefree individuals in Love Mode, seemingly immune to Reiji's anger and readily joining in Kiichi's antics. He's also the only heterosexual guy in the entire series.
Takimura Rin
First appearance: Volume 7. He's a host in Blue Boy, and became the number one uke after Yanase Izumi retired. He's cute, but has a nasty temper, and he accepts only high-class customers and doesn't welcome sexual relationship requests. However, since Ian (see below) has signed him up for a long-term contract, it seems Ian is the only club member Rin has ever actually had any relationship with. Rin is reserved and well mannered, but easily irritated when coupling with Ian. He was raised by Jin (see below), who is Rin's primary consultant in several matters.
Ian Sanders
Seventeen years old, first appearance: Volume 7. Even at the age of seventeen, he is one of the world's most famous super-models. He requested Izumi of the Blue Boy, but got Rin instead. Ian is a passionate young man, and bursting with energy and testosterone, which Rin doesn't take too well to.
Katsuki Kyosuke
First appearance: Volume 7. The “Wild Boar” of the series, he falls in love with Jin (see below) at first sight. Katsuki looks to become a host at Blue Boy, with Jin as his personal trainer. He's friends with Seiichi (see below), and he also cries easily when he's drunk.
Kuniaki Jinnai
Thirty-six years old, first appearance: Volume 6. Called “Jin” for short, he's the oldest host at Blue Boy. He's also the number two seme, after Seiichi (see below). His first love was originally an Arab prince. Jin never shared his love for over an entire decade, until he met Katsuki. He is also one of the hosts that has worked for both Reiji and his father Shougo, Blue Boy's previous owner. He is also referred to as "The Wolf". Kiichi warns Naoya to beware of being eaten by a wolf when he visits Reiji at work.
Saginuma Tomoki
Fourteen years old, first appearance: Volume 6. He was the son of a famous actress, but his existence was never revealed. Suffering from a terminal illness, he wanted to know what it was like to be truly loved as his last wish. Kiichi was his doctor, and hired Seiichi, whom Tomoki first met at a hospital when Seiichi went to see Yanase Izumi, to be his lover for two weeks. This came to a screeching halt when Tomoki's sickness got the better of him. Seiichi retired from Blue Boy in order to be with Tomoki, who decided to return home instead of stay in the hospital. He lived the final chapter of his life with Seiichi. To date, Tomoki is most likely the youngest client Blue Boy has ever had.
Amagai Seiichi
First appearance: Volume 6. He's the number one on the seme side of the Blue Boy. Kiichi hired him to be young Tomoki's lover for a two-week period, and was confused about his feelings toward the boy after the contract expired prematurely. Seiichi followed Jin's advice to retire from Blue Boy and stay with Tomoki as a spouse, but returned to work after Tomoki died. He is also good friends with Katsuki.
Aoe Shougo
Reiji and Kiichi's father, and the person responsible for the existence of the Blue Boy. A coldly manipulative and sadistic person, he enjoyed profiting off the misery and ruin of others. He had a very abusive and exploitative relationship with his sons and only considered how they might be useful to him. He paid more attention to Reiji, whom he believed could both run the family business and carry on the Aoe name. He saw Kiichi only as ab object to be used to further his own business and personal interests. One instance of this is when he imprisoned him on the family grounds for a few years. Though Shougo ended up leaving everything to Reiji, Reiji only took hold of the businesses and gave the Aoe estate to Kiichi.
