= Midnight Panther =

Japanese hentai manga

ミッドナイトパンサー (Middonaito Pansā)
- Genre: Comedy, Fantasy, Hentai
- Manga
- Written by: Yu Asagiri
- Published by: Gakken
- English publisher: CPM Manga
- Magazine: Monthly Comic Nora
- Original run: February 1994 – March 1997
- Volumes: 4
- Original video animation
- Directed by: Yōsei Morino
- Written by: Yōsei Morino
- Music by: Ann Fu
- Studio: ARMS
- Licensed by: NA: Anime18
- Released: August 25, 1998 – December 18, 1998
- Runtime: 30 minutes
- Episodes: 2

Midnight Panther (ミッドナイトパンサー, Middonaito Pansā) is the name of a hentai manga created by Yu Asagiri, which later spawned an OVA. Both manga and anime were licensed by Anime 18.

== Plot ==
Taking place in a post-apocalyptic fantasy world, this is the story about three beautiful, young females named Sonya, Kei, and Lukish. They are in an extremely popular girl band called The Pussy Cats which is managed by an old hag.

However, this is only a cover up. In actuality, the girls are the notorious female assassins known as The Midnight Panther, who will kill men for money by first sleeping with them and executing them in their own unique manner. The old hag is, in reality, a witch who arranges the transactions.

However, when the girls receive a commission to kill the despotic king who is murdering his subjects, one of them takes the job personally and requests the honor.

== Characters ==
- Sonya Sei

Voiced by: Yoshiko Nikaido (Japanese); Suzy Prue (English)

A very sexy, dark haired buxom woman who has the ability to grow and retract her extra resistant hair which she uses to garotte her victims - but not before she seduces them.

- Kei Sinclair

Voiced by: Yayoi Nagasawa (Japanese); Debora Rabbai (English)

An active blonde girl who can shapeshift into a leopard. She uses this feline form to devour her victims after she plays with them.

- Lukish

Voiced by: Miho Sakuragi (Japanese); Ruby Seedless (English)

Also known as "Lou", she is the youngest of the three. Lukish was separated at a young age from her family, a king and queen, when they were killed by her brother Bad. After suffering an injury because of her escape, she was rescued and taken in by the hag. After being given treatments, Lukish went through several changes. Her once pale skin was now a dark tan color. She gained exceedingly great strength, as well as immunity to poisons and is, herself, poisonous. Anyone touching her skin for an extended period runs the risk of dying a slow, horrible death. It is revealed these changes were due to the medicine's ingredients being from the liver of a Basilisk dragon. As Lukish is the youngest of the Midnight Panthers, she is not allowed to participate in assassination missions and instead has to hunt dragons as ingredients for the old hag.

- Old Hag

Voiced by: Shōhei Tano (Japanese); Mina Sands (English)

A strange, ugly old woman who remains unnamed throughout the feature. She runs the activities of both the Pussy Cats and the Midnight Panther. She has a wide understanding of alchemy, especially with toxins, and used that knowledge to save Lukish when she was injured long ago. In the manga, it is revealed that she is the founder of Midnight Panther.

- Dark

Voiced by: Kazuya Sawatari (Japanese); Jeff Gimble (English)

Kei's panther companion. He is very protective of her.

- Bad Elohim Gibor II

Voiced by: Keiichi Misono (Japanese); Tristan Goddard (English)

A tyrannical king who is killing his subject out of a whim... and the half-brother of Lukish. Because he was born out of wedlock, Bad was excluded as heir to the throne, the duty given to Lukish (who was disguised as a boy since only males could inherit the throne). Bad then killed his parents and nearly killed Lukish before she escaped. He later regretted his actions, because he was secretly in love with Lukish (he had no idea that Lukish was actually female and believed himself to be homosexual).
