= Selfish Love (manga) =

Japanese manga

君主サマの恋は勝手 (Kunshusama no koiha katte)
- Genre: Yaoi
- Manga
- Written by: Naduki Koujima
- Published by: Biblos
- English publisher: NA: Central Park Media
- Magazine: Magazine Be × Boy
- Original run: September 22, 2004 – November 24, 2004
- Volumes: 2

Selfish Love (君主サマの恋は勝手, Kunshusama no koiha katte!; lit. The Monarch's Lover) is a yaoi manga by Naduki Koujima (こうじま奈月, Koujima Naduki). The plot follows student Ryuya as he is picked by Honors Society president Orito to be his assistant.

== Publication ==
Some copies of the English version of Selfish Love #1 were accidentally printed with missing pages. On November 17, 2004, Be Beautiful Manga began offering to replace any defective copies. In keeping with American morals, the characters' school was changed in the English version to being a college rather than a high school.

== Reception ==
Selfish Love carries an 18+ age advisory. Kristy L. Valenti, writing for The Comics Journal, felt that rape fantasy played a part in the unwillingness of Ryuya, and enjoyed the portrayal of "fag hag" Azusa. Mike Dungan found the "near-rape" of Ryuya confronting, "killing any enjoyment" Dungan had for the first volume. He felt the manga improved with the character development of Orito, and that Ryuya's growing love for Orito made amends for the first volume's portrayal. He also enjoyed the character of Azusa, expressing a wish for a volume about her. Janet Crocker, writing for Animefringe, noted the lack of explicit sex in the title.
