= Love Pistols =

Japanese manga series

- Cover of the first volume of the English edition
- Genre: Yaoi, romance, science fantasy
- Manga
- Written by: Tarako Kotobuki
- Published by: Biblos (2004–2005); Libre Publishing (2006–2007)
- English publisher: NA: suBLime Manga Viz Media Blu Manga (former)
- Magazine: Magazine Be × Boy
- Original run: January 10, 2004 – present
- Volumes: 11
- Original video animation

Sex Pistols
- Released: March 26, 2010 – June 25, 2010
- Episodes: 2

Love Pistols (originally titled Sex Pistols in Japan) is a Japanese yaoi manga series written and illustrated by Tarako Kotobuki. The English release was renamed from the original Japanese title "Sex Pistols" to "avoid any legal trouble" with the English punk rock group of the same name. The premise of the story is that 30% of humans are not descended from apes but from other animals (these people are called "Zoomans") and they can interbreed with humans and with other male Zoomans by the use of a symbiote. Norio, an ordinary high school student discovers his Zoomanity and deals with the advances of many male Zoomans who want him to have their babies. The series previously licensed and published in English in North America by Tokyopop's Blu imprint is now published under Viz Media's BL imprint, SuBLime. Geneon released a series of four Drama CDs for Sex Pistols between November 27, 2004, and April 25, 2008. A two-episode original video animation adaptation went on sale in 2010.

== Characters ==
Tsuburaya Norio
OVA voice actor: Hiro Shimono
CD Drama voice actor: Chihiro Suzuki

He is the main character of the story who doesn't seem to understand that he's a returner to ancestry and has trouble hiding his scent. He usually relies on Kunimasa's blind in order to hide his scent. He loves Kunimasa and tends to do stupid things and apologize for them later on. One incident involves his Bear oak Madararui senpai who was deeply in love with him and whom he fully rejected.

Madarame Kunimasa
OVA voice actor: Yoshihisa Kawahara
CD Drama voice actor: Kiyoyuki Yanada

A heavy seed nekomata Madararui (Jaguar), he's claimed Norio as his mate. He's usually stoic or conceited but his feelings for Norio are genuine. He's the very smart younger half brother of Yonekuni. They share the same mother but have different fathers. His mother tried to make him mate with another were cat in another chapter by lighting incense that made him go into a 'heat' spiral.

Madarame Yonekuni
OVA voice actor: Tomokazu Sugita
CD Drama voice actor: Takehito Koyasu

The older half-brother of Kunimasa, he is a heavy seed and a dragon shape, the half between a snake and dragon. His father (Maximilian Seymour) being a heavy seed dragon (crocodile) while his mother (Madarame Makio) is a heavy seed snake. With an extreme hatred for any and all things male, he puts Norio through hell in his training (forcing Norio to wear girls clothes, though that was Kunimasa's idea). Though he hates everything men, except himself, he "befriends" Fujiwara Shiro. Asking Shiro to be his pretend friend, he treats Shiro almost the same way he treats other guys. Through a complicated mess, awaking from what he thought was a dream, he was faced with the reality of having slept with a male (despite his disgust for anything and anyone male). While sleeping with his coworker, he thought back to what Shiro (Shirou) told him and realized, though denying it to himself, that Shiro was the one who rescued him from near death.

Fujiwara Shiro (Shirou)
OVA voice actor: Wataru Hatano
CD Drama voice actor: Daisuke Hirakawa

Because of what he was, sickly and in bad health (though it was never revealed as to what exactly was wrong), his parents hypnotized him into protecting his secret. "Close your eyes and cover your mouth; you'll forget your true form." Taken in by the Fujiwaras (both Shiro's adopted mother and father's names have never been released), he was adopted as their son. Shiro never knew of his birth parents, the only hint to his secret was his higher body temperature, which led Yonekuni to him. Living somewhat a double life, the only male "friend" that Yonekuni had and, at night, the lover Yonekuni visited when it rained or he became "sickly." It was soon that his secret, both of them, were revealed: Yonekuni awaking to what he thought was a dream, only to find out that he had been making his way to Shiro's place and sleeping with him, the secret he never knew about until Yonekuni willingly and full-heartedly slept with him; the spell that his parents placed on him was broken. From there, Shiro was able to tell as much as he knew to Yonekuni and that started his lessons with the Madarame family.

== Media ==
=== Manga ===
Biblos published the manga's 5 tankōbon between January 10, 2004, and December 9, 2006. Libre Publishing published the manga into 4 kanzenban volumes between June 1, 2007, and September 1, 2007. In December 2009, a new chapter ran in Magazine B-Boy, now owned by Libre. Blu released the manga's 5 tankōbon between January 2007 and May 2008. Viz Media has released two volumes the first on January 21, 2012 and the second on February 29, 2012.

=== Drama CDs ===
Geneon released a series of four Drama CDs for Sex Pistols. All four CDs were voiced by Hiroki Takahashi, Jurouta Kosugi, Sayaka Ohara, Kentaro Ito, Koji Yusa and Naoki Bandō. The first was released on November 27, 2004. The second was released on March 26, 2005. The third was released on February 24, 2006. The fourth and final was released on April 25, 2008.

=== Anime ===
The manga was adapted into a 2 episode original video animation, called Sex Pistols. The first volume went on sale in March 2010. The Sex Pistols OVA2 was released in early 2011."

== Reception ==
Anime News Network's Casey Brienza commends the manga as the "most original--and weird--BL manga series on the market today". Sequential Tart's Margaret O'Connell criticises the manga for its characters' occasional "disproportionately small heads". ActiveAnime's Sandra Scholes commends the manga's "skilfully drawn" art. Comic Book Bin's Leroy Douresseaux criticises the manga approaching the "Zoomanity" topic, labeling it "convoluted and not all that interesting". Jessica Bauwens-Sugimoto, felt that Love Pistols was a cult story, being "so bad it's good". Thematically, Bauwens-Sugimoto feels that the author plays with, but ultimately reinforces, the tropes of "how (female) attractiveness depends on fertility, stalking is true love, and women will trick men into getting them pregnant to trap them."
