= Animate (retailer) =

Japanese anime, video game, and manga retailer

Animate Ltd.

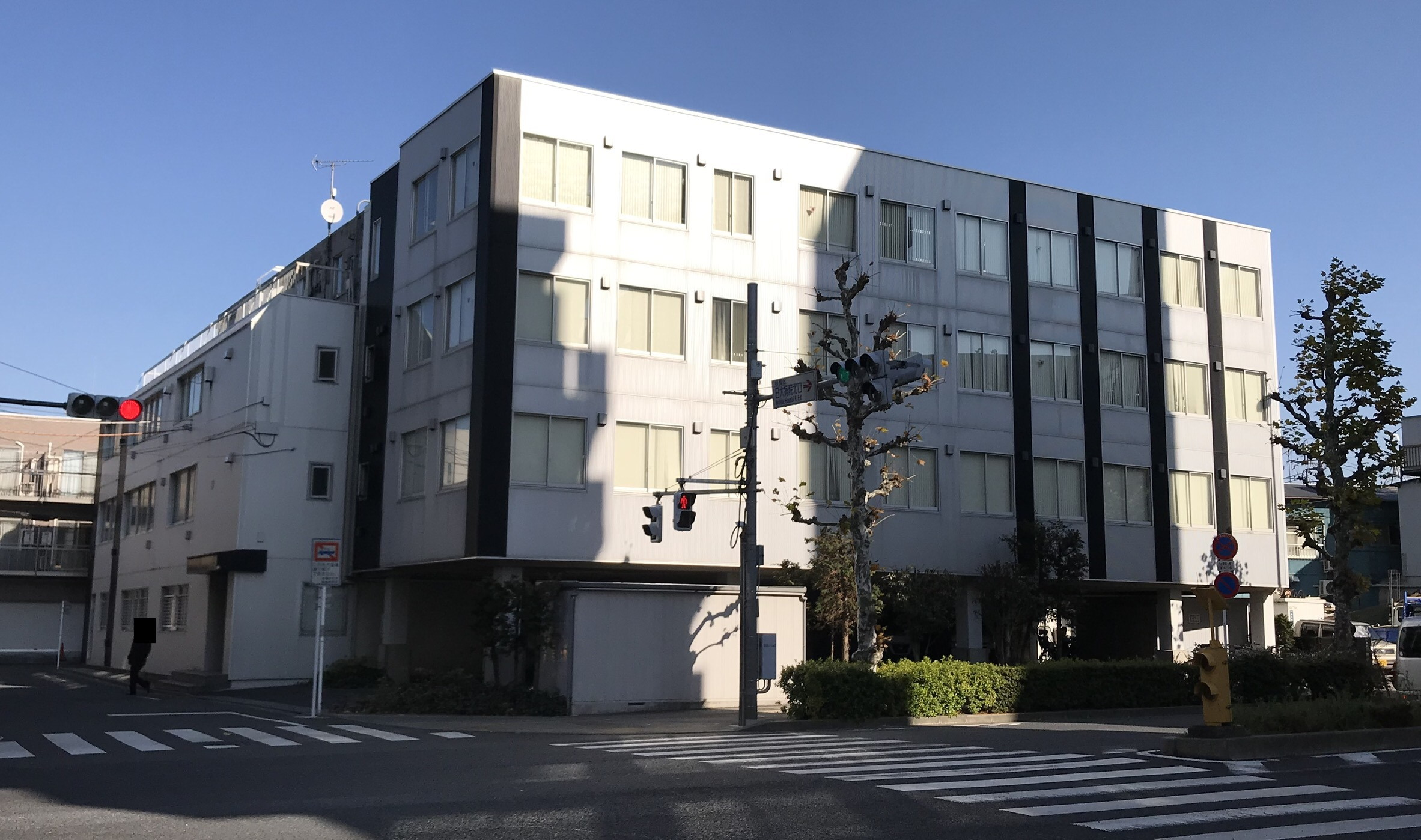
- Headquarters in Itabashi, Tokyo
- Native name: 株式会社アニメイト
- Romanized name: Kabushiki-gaisha Animeito
- Type: Subsidiary KK
- Industry: Retail
- Founded: July 9, 1987; 39 years ago
- Headquarters: Yayoicho, Itabashi, Tokyo, Japan
- Area served: Japan; Taiwan; Thailand; China; South Korea; Malaysia; California; Hong Kong; England; United States; Philippines
- Owner: Animate Holdings
- Website: www.animate.co.jp

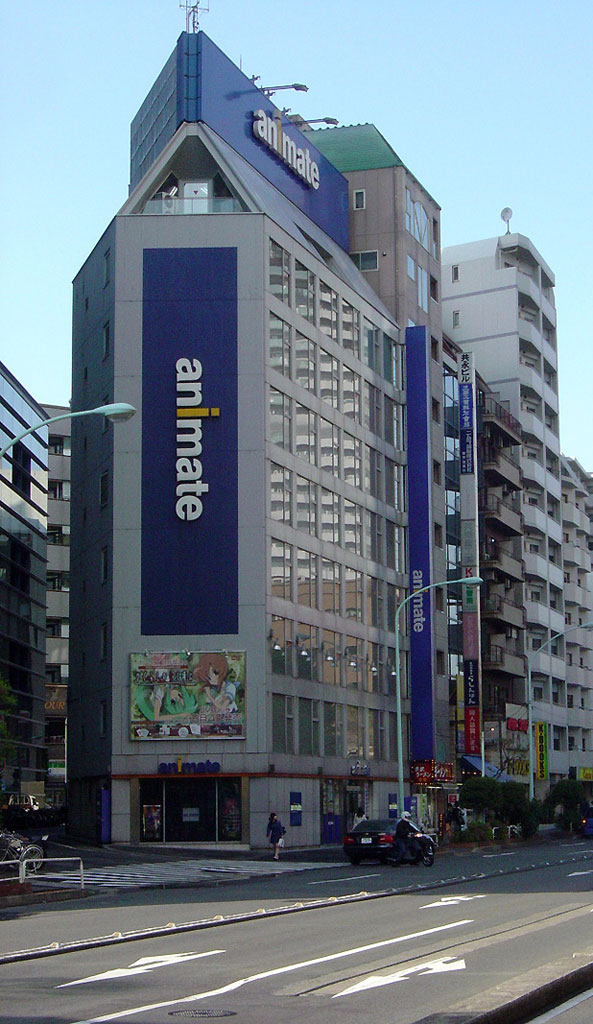
Animate Ikebukuro main store

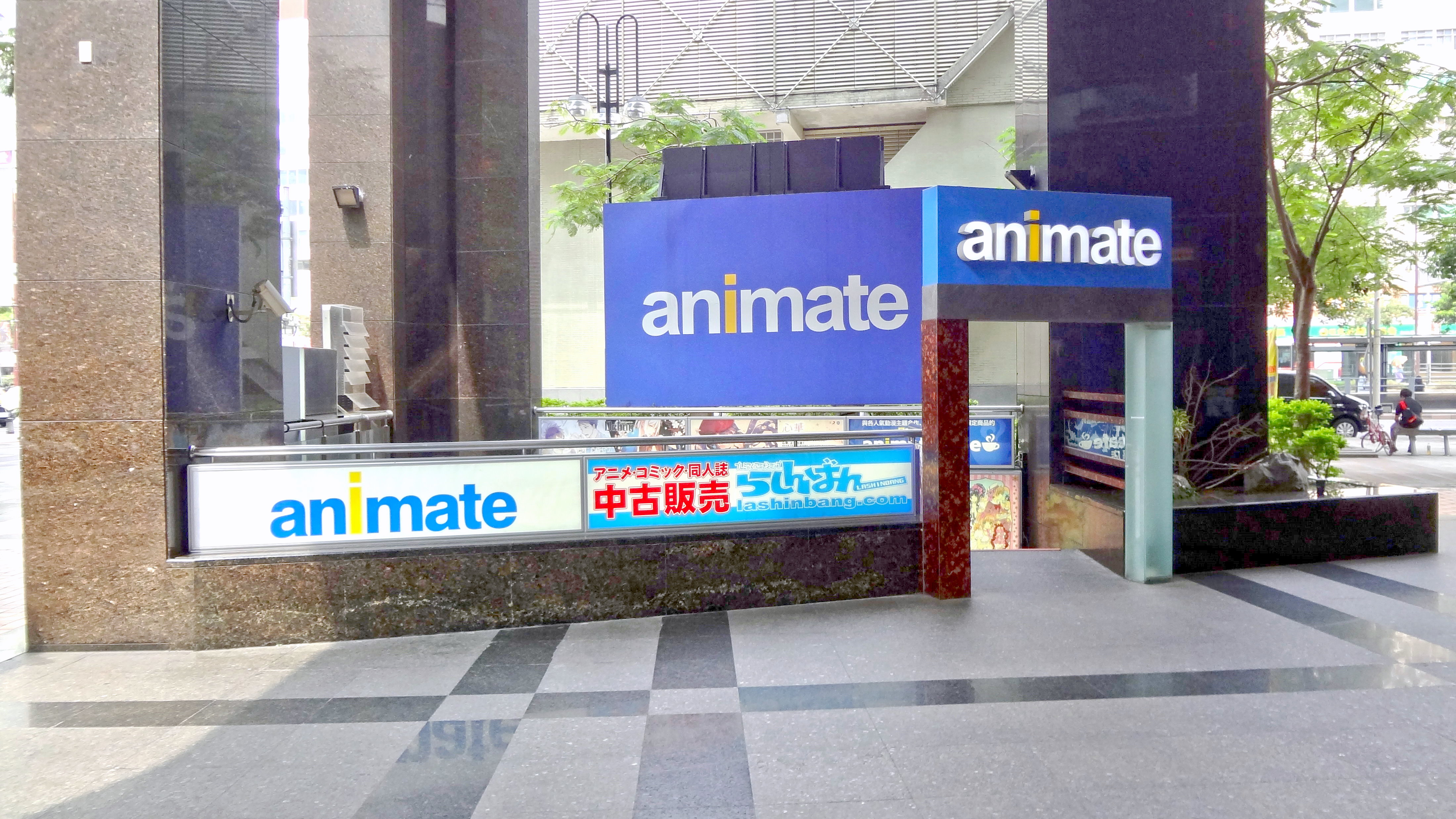
Animate Taipei

Animate Ltd. (株式会社アニメイト, Kabushiki gaisha Animeito) is the retailing arm of Movic and is the largest retailer of anime, video games and manga in Japan. The first flagship store of Animate was opened in 1983 in Ikebukuro, a district in Tokyo, Japan.

== Retail stores ==
Currently there are 118 Animate stores in Japan, four in mainland China (Beijing, Shanghai, Nanjing and Chengdu), three in Taiwan (Taipei, Taichung and Kaohsiung), two in Thailand (Bangkok and Rangsit), one in Kuala Lumpur, Malaysia, and two in South Korea (Seoul and Busan). Animate opened a store in the Del Amo Fashion Center in Torrance, California, in summer 2023. Animate is opening a store in Hong Kong in 2025, after a previous store closed in 2020. Animate opened a store in United Kingdom, London in 2026 at The Sidings Waterloo near London Waterloo station. In October 2026, Animate opened a store in One Ayala, Makati, Philippines, making it the fourth Animate store in Southeast Asia.

=== Online stores ===
Animate currently has two online stores: the animate Online Shop, which has been active since 2005, and animate International.

=== Former stores ===
- Sakaihigashi Station, Osaka

== Subsidiaries ==
- Acos Co., Ltd. (株式会社アコス): A subsidiary specialized in costumes.
  - ACOS animate costume kan (ACOS アニメイトコスチューム館): A chain of costume shops by acos co., ltd.
  - ACOS Online Shop (ACOSオンラインショップ): An online shop for acos co., ltd.
- Animate Film (アニメイトフィルム): An animation studio.
- Animate-GyaO Corporation (株式会社アニメイトギャオ)/animate Bookstore (アニメイトブックストア): An electronic book store.
- Animate North America, Ltd.: A North American subsidiary.
  - USA Animate Online Shop: An online store for the United States market for Animate North AMERICA, Ltd., established in Jan 2013. The online store was closed on 2016-02-29, and re-opened on 2018-07-14.
- Animate Oversea Co., Ltd. (安利美特股份有限公司): A joint venture of animate Ltd., Kadokawa Taiwan Corporation, and Nongxueshe (later United Distribution Co.). The company acts as an operator of Animate branches in Taiwan and Hong Kong. In 2000, the first overseas store was established in Ximending, Taipei.
- Animate Shanghai Co., Ltd. (魅特（上海）商贸有限公司): Established in May 2011.
  - Animate Chinese online shopping platform (animate中国線上購物平台): A Tmall online store operated by animate Shanghai Co., Ltd., established in 2012-01-06.
- Animate Times (アニメイトタイムズ, Animmeito Taimuzu): An online streaming and industry news site. It was formerly "Animate TV", but changed its name in 2016.
- Japan Manga Alliance CO., LTD. (株式会社ジャパン マンガ アラインス): It is a joint venture of animate Ltd., Kadokawa Corporation, Kodansha, Shueisha, Shogakukan, established in 2015-09-01. The company was incorporated in Bangkok, Thailand in autumn 2015. The company acts as an operator of Animate branches in Bangkok.
  - animate JMA Co., Ltd: Established in 2015-09-28 as a 100% subsidiary of Japan Manga Alliance. The first animate shop under the company was opened in 2016-02-06 at MBK (Mahboonkrong) Center in Bangkok as animate Bangkok store (アニメイト バンコク店).
- Libre (リブレ出版株式会社): Originally part of Biblos Co., Ltd. (株式会社ビブロス) Following the bankruptcy of Biblos on April 5, 2006, caused by the chain bankruptcy started by its parent company Hekitensha (碧天舎), animate, MOVIC, Frontier Works Inc. funded the company allowing Biblos Co., Ltd., to continue operation. On May 1, 2006, the company was renamed Libre Publishing and became a subsidiary of animate Ltd. However, the company was still registered as established on December 28, 2000.

=== Group companies ===
- ANIBRO Ltd. (株式会社アニブロ): On January 23, 2008, Animate's rival company, Broccoli, announced that they collaborated with Animate and made a new company "AniBro", with Animate holds 70% of the company, while Broccoli holds 30%. The president of the company will be the CEO of Animate, although he will continue to manage Animate along with AniBro. AniBro plans to expand using the AniBro brand to many places in Japan.
- coade (株式会社コアデ): The company name was derived from its own slogan 'Code Anime Design'.
- Frontier Works Inc. (株式会社フロンティアワークス)
- Marine ENTERTAINMENT Inc. (株式会社マリン・エンタテインメント)
- Movic Co. Ltd. (株式会社ムービック)
- Movic Promote Service(株式会社ムービックプロモートサービス)
- SHOSEN (株式会社書泉): Became part of animate Ltd. on 2011-06-29.

=== Former subsidiaries ===
- Chikyuu ya (ちきゅーや): Operated by animate since 2008, and was later closed in 2014-12-22.
- coade (株式会社コアデ) Rakuten branch: Established in 2010-12-01, and was later closed in 2013.
- Wanwan plus (ワンワンプラス): Established in 2004, and was later closed.

== Marketing ==
Meito Anisawa (兄沢 命斗, Anisawa Meito) is Animate's mascot character, affectionately known as the Anime Tenchō (アニメ店長). He is depicted as a wild anime character with spiky hair and rippling muscles, clad with the Animate uniform, going to extreme measures to promote Animate's goods. An original video animation based on the character was produced by Gainax and released in 2002. Another OVA was released in 2010. An animation project which crosses over Anime Tencho with the Touhou Project was produced by ufotable and aired on November 20, 2010, at the Animate Ichioshi Bishojo Anime Matsuri to celebrate the 10th anniversary of Animate's mascot character. Meito has also made various appearances in other media, such as the Lucky Star anime series and video games such as Disgaea 4 and Touch My Katamari. Meito is voiced by Tomokazu Seki in his anime appearances, and is voiced by Lex Lang in the English dub of Lucky Star.
