= Libre (publisher) =

Japanese publishing company

Libre Inc.
- Native name: 株式会社リブレ
- Romanized name: Kabushiki-gaisha Ribure
- Type: Kabushiki gaisha
- Industry: Publication
- Genre: Manga, Yaoi
- Headquarters: Kagurazaka, Shinjuku, Tokyo, Japan
- Parent: Animate
- Website: libre-inc.co.jp

Libre Inc. (株式会社リブレ, Kabushiki-gaisha Ribure), formerly known as Libre Publishing (リブレ出版株式会社, Ribure Shuppan Kabushiki-gaisha) from 2006 to 2016, is a Japanese publishing company owned by Animate. Libre primarily publishes yaoi and teens' love manga and light novels, which are run in their magazines Magazine Be × Boy and Be × Boy Gold. The company was founded on May 8, 2006, after Biblos closed in April 2006, when their original parent company, Hekitensha, filed for bankruptcy.

== History ==
Biblos was originally formed under publisher Hekitensha in 1988 for publishing yaoi content, including magazines such as Magazine Be × Boy, Be × Boy Gold, and Junk! Boy. In 2006, Hekitensha declared bankruptcy, which caused Biblos to close in April 2006. All publications under Biblos were put on indefinite hiatus until they rebranded as Libre Publishing on May 8, 2006, with Animate as their parent company. Several magazines previously owned by Biblos were transferred to Libre, including Magazine Be × Boy and Be × Boy Gold. Other magazines and anthologies, such as Junk! and Zero, were later relaunched under different names; the anthology B-Boy LUV became B-Boy Phoenix. In 2016, Libre Publishing renamed their company as Libre.

Aside from print media, Libre publishes audio drama CDs under the labels Cue Egg Label and Melty Drop. Cue Egg Label was originally launched by Biblos and acquired under the rebranding; the label features audio adaptations of Libre's yaoi manga. Melty Drop is Libre's original label featuring adult-oriented otome situation drama CDs marketed to women.

=== English-licensing partnerships ===
In 2010, Animate USA announced that they would release some of Libre's books on the Amazon Kindle format, and in September of that year, Libre sent cease and desist notices to several scanlation groups.

In October 2011, the American manga publisher Viz Media launched the BL imprint SuBLime in collaboration with Libre and its parent company Animate to publish English-language BL for the print and worldwide digital market. In June 2016, Libre Publishing terminated their partnership with Digital Manga Publishing.

== Controversies ==
After the closure of Biblos in April 2006, Libre gained the licenses for former Biblos titles. Central Park Media, who held the English license for North American publication with Biblos, continued to publish their former Biblos titles, and in 2007, Libre described CPM's continued publication of their titles as "illegal", saying that they needed to renegotiate licenses. Central Park Media stated in December 2007 that Libre had "refused to discuss" the issue with them, and that they regarded their licenses with Biblos as still being legally binding with Libre. After Central Park Media filed for bankruptcy in April 2009, Libre released another statement stating that they had not been in a business relationship for some time prior to this, and that Libre expected new titles to be released by their new US publishers.

On October 11, 2015, Libre issued an apology on their official website to manga artist Harada for publishing her dōjinshi in a special issue of B-Boy without her permission.

== Publications ==
=== Magazines ===
First publication	Final publication	Magazine name	Status	Frequency	Notes
1993	—N/a	Magazine Be × Boy	Active	Monthly	Acquired from Biblos; first launched in March 1993
1995	—N/a	Be × Boy Gold	Active	Bi-monthly	First launched in 1995 by Biblos; relaunched under Libre in 2006; more explicit contents and short stories
2008	2015	Junk! Boy	Defunct	Semi-yearly	Originally titled Junk! by Biblos; relaunched in 2008 by Libre under the title Junk! Boy. Titles transferred to Magazine Be × Boy after final issue
1994	—N/a	Shosetsu B-Boy (小説ビーボーイ)	Active	Monthly	First launched in 1995 by Biblos; relaunched under Libre in June 2006 as special issues in Be × Boy Gold; novels

=== Digital magazines ===
First publication	Final publication	Magazine name	Status	Frequency	Notes
1994	—N/a	Kurofune (クロフネ)	Active	Semi-yearly	First launched in 1994 by Biblos under the title Zero; re-launched in May 2008 as Kurofune Zero (クロフネZERO) under Libre; stories are all-genre with focus on the fantasy and science fiction genres. The magazine entered a joint partnership with Pixiv Comics in October 2012, where it is distributed digitally under their platform since then. The magazine was renamed Kurofune on November 24, 2016.
2009	2018	B-Boy Cube (b－boyキューブ)	Defunct	Semi-yearly	
2017	—N/a	Chocolove (ショコラブ)	Active	Monthly	Teens love; first issue released on February 23, 2017
2016	2022	B-Boy Omegaverse (b-boyオメガバース)	Defunct	Monthly	Originally a series of semi-monthly anthologies focusing on omegaverse; first issue released on June 20, 2019
2019	—N/a	Vanilove (バニラブ)	Active	Monthly	Teens love; first issue released on November 28, 2019

=== Anthologies ===
First publication	Final publication	Title	Status	Frequency	Notes
2006	2009	B-Boy Phoenix	Defunct	Semi-yearly	Published from July 20, 2006, to October 1, 2009, with a total of 20 volumes.
2010	2013	Citron	Defunct	Semi-yearly	Published from 2010 to 2013.
2012	—N/a	X-BL	Active	Semi-yearly	Explicit yaoi manga anthology series marketed towards women 18 years or older; includes Pink Gold series
2016	2019	B-Boy Omegaverse (b-boyオメガバース)	Defunct	Semi-yearly	A series of short stories focusing on omegaverse; first series was published digitally from August 18, 2016, to June 15, 2017, with a total of six volumes. A second series titled B-Boy Omegaverse Phase 2 was published digitally from October 19, 2017, to September 27, 2018, with a total of 7 volumes. A third series titled B-Boy Omegaverse Mercury was published digitally from October 18, 2018, to April 18, 2019, with a total of 7 volumes. The anthology was later relaunched as a monthly digital magazine.

== See also ==
- Our Everlasting
