= List of boys' love anime and manga =

This is a list of boys' love anime, manga, OVAs, ONAs, and films.

== Manga ==
The following yaoi titles were originally published as manga; any subsequent adaptations into other mediums are noted.

From	To	Title	Creator(s)	Publisher	Volumes	Adaptation(s)	Ref(s)
2004	2004	9th Sleep	Makoto Tateno	Biblos	1		
2022	present	10 Things I Want to Do Before I Turn 40	Mamita	Libre	2	Audio drama, live-action television drama	
2014	2014	Adolescence Boy & "It"	Aya Sakyō	Tokuma Shoten	1	Audio drama	
2007	2007	After I Win	Kaname Itsuki	Houbunsha	1		
2008	2008	Age Called Blue	Est Em	Tokyo Mangasha	1		
2000	2003	Ai no Kotodama	Keiko Konno	Frontier Works	2	Live-action film	
2009	present	Akiyama-kun	Aiko Nobara	Tokyo Mangasha	3		
2007	2007	Alcohol, Shirt and Kiss	Yuko Kuwabara	Biblos	1		
2008	2008	All Nippon Air Line	Kei Azumaya	Magazine Magazine	1		
2006	2006	Alley of First Love	Ellie Mamahara	Tokuma Shoten	1		
2017	present	At 25:00, in Akasaka	Hiroko Natsuno	Shodensha	5	Audio drama, live-action television series	
2008	2008	Author's Pet	Deathco Cotorino	Magazine Magazine	1		
2006	2006	Awaken Forest	Yuna Aoi	Taiyo Tosho		—N/a	
2004	2016	Awkward Silence	Hinako Takanaga	Biblos (2004–2006), Libre (2006–2016)	6	Audio drama	
2006	2006	Barefoot Waltz	Romuko Miike	Houbunsha	1		
2006	2006	Baseball Heaven	Ellie Mamahara	Tokuma Shoten	1		
2003	2005	Black Knight	Kai Tsurugi	Biblos	4	—N/a	
2008	2008	Blood Honey	Sakyou Yozakura	Gentosha	1	—N/a	
2009	2015	Blue Morning	Shoko Hidaka	Tokuma Shoten	6		
2006	2015	Blue Sheep Reverie	Makoto Tateno	Nihon Bungeisha	9	—N/a	
2007	2007	Blue Sky	Yuko Kuwabara	Biblos	1		
2013		Blue Sky Complex	Kei Ichikawa				
2004	2005	Brilliant Blue	Saemi Yorita	Shinshokan	2	—N/a	
2008		Bond of Dreams, Bond of Love	Yaya Sakuragi				
2003		Bond(z)	Toko Kawai	Biblos	1	—N/a	
2004		Brother	Yuzuha Ougi	Kaiohsha	2	—N/a	
1997	2001	...But, I'm Your Teacher	Row Takakura	Biblos	1	—N/a	
2007	2007	Candy	Satomi Sugita	Oakla Publications	1		
2010	present	Candy Color Paradox	Isaku Natsume	Shinshokan	6	Audio drama, OVA, live-action television series	
2004	2004	A Capable Man	Hinako Takanaga	Kadokawa Shoten	1		
2020	present	Caressing My Hibernating Bear	Haruchika	Suiseisha	7	Audio drama, anime television series	
2014	2021	Caste Heaven	Chise Ogawa	Libre	8	Audio drama, video game	
2007	2007	Cause of My Teacher	Temari Matsumoto	Libre	1		
2018	present	Cherry Magic! Thirty Years of Virginity Can Make You a Wizard?!	Yuu Toyota	Square Enix	13	Live-action television series, live-action film	
2006	present	Classmates	Asumiko Nakamura	Akane Shinsha	6	Anime film	
1999		Color	Eiki Eiki & Taishi Zaō	Shinshokan	1	—N/a	
2006	2009	The Cornered Mouse Dreams of Cheese (Note: The Cornered Mouse Dreams of Cheese is a josei manga series, but has since been considered a boys' love series by industry professionals and marketing.)	Setona Mizushiro	Shogakukan	2	Audio drama, live-action film	
2017	present	Cosmetic Playlover	Sachi Narashima	Libre	8	Audio drama, live-action television series	
2006	2021	Crimson Spell	Ayano Yamane	Chara	7	Audio drama	
2013	present	Dakaichi: I'm Being Harassed By the Sexiest Man of the Year	Hashigo Sakurabi	Libre	9	Audio drama, anime television series	
2018	present	Dangerous Drugs of Sex	Yuki Mizuta	Magazine Magazine	2	Live-action film	
2009		Delusion Elektel	Yonezou Nekota				
2019	2021	Dick Fight Island	Reibun Ike	Libre	2		
2007	2007	Dining Bar Akira	Tomoko Yamashita	Tokyomangasha	1		
2006	2015	Does the Flower Blossom?	Shoko Hidaka	Gentosha	5	Audio drama, live-action film	
2006	present	Don't Be Cruel	Yonezou Nekota	Libre	11	Audio drama	
2016		The Dragon's Betrothed	Meguru Hinohara	Shinshokan	2		
2002	2002	Dry Heat	Yugi Yamada	Houbunsha	1		
1999	2009	Embracing Love	Youka Nitta	Biblos	14		
2019	2021	The End of the World With You	Maki Marukido	Shodensha	2	Live-action television series	
2006	2006	Endless Rain	Yuuya	Ookura Shuppan	1		
2015	2018	Escape Journey	Ogeretsu Tanaka	Libre	3		
2017	present	Even a Dad Still Wants It...	Serina Seo	Suiseisha	3	Anime television series	
2020	present	Everything for Demon King Evelogia	Io Kaziwara	Suiseisha	7	Audio drama, anime television series	
2002	present	Finder	Ayano Yamane	Libre	12	Audio drama, original video animation	
2015		Fourth Generation Head: Tatsuyuki Oyamato	Scarlet Beriko	Shinshokan	1		
2019	present	Fudanshi Shōkan	Moe Fujisaki	Futabasha	2		
2002	2004	Future Lovers	Saika Kunieda	Biblos	2		
2005	2006	A Gentleman's Kiss	Shinri Fuwa	Tokuma Shoten	2	Audio drama	
2014		Ginger Honey	Isaku Natsume				
2013	present	Given	Natsuki Kizu	Shinshokan	7	Audio drama, anime television series, anime film, stage play	
2014	2016	Go For It, Nakamura!	Syundei	Akane Shinsha	1	Anime television series	
2003	2004	Golden Cain	You Asagiri	Biblos	1		
2006	2006	Golden Prince and Argent King	Kouko Agawa	Libre	1		
1996	2002	Gravitation	Maki Murakami	Gentosha	12	OVA, anime TV series, audio drama, novels	
2012	2013	Hana no Miyako de	Rihito Takarai				
2003	2003	Happiness Recommended	Souya Himawari	Houbunsha	1		
2020	2023	Happy of the End	Ogeretsu Tanaka	Takeshobo	3	Audio drama, live-action television series	
2008	Present	His Favorite	Suzuki Tanaka	Magazine Be x Boy	12		
2012	present	Hitorijime My Hero	Memeco Arii	Ichijinsha	13	Anime television series	
2006	2006	Hot Limit	Minori Shima & Akira Kanbe	Nihon Bungeisha	1		
2007		How to Seduce a Vampire	Nimosaku Shimada				
2005	2005	Hybrid Child	Shungiku Nakamura	Biblos	1		
2022	2025	I Became the Main Role of a BL Drama	Machi Suzuri	Ichijinsha	5	Live-action television series	
2013	present	I Hear the Sunspot	Yuki Fumino	Canna Comics	5	Live-action film, audio drama, live-action television series	
2006	present	I Want to Be Naughty	Mei Sakuraga	Houbunsha	14	Audio drama	
2021	present	If It's You, I Might Try Falling in Love	Maru Kubota	Hakusensha	5	Audio drama, live-action television series	
2015		Jackass!	Scarlet Beriko	Shinshokan			
2002	present	Junjo Romantica: Pure Romance	Shungiku Nakamura	Kadokawa Shoten	29	Anime television series	
2010		Kimi Note	Junko		1		
1997	1998	Kiss All the Boys	Shiuko Kano	Ohzora Publishing	3		
2006	2007	Kiss Blue	Keiko Kinoshita	Taiyoh Tosho	2		
1992	2008	Kizuna: Bonds of Love	Kazuma Kodaka	Biblos	11		
2012	2013	Koitomo!?	Yuu Moegi	Core Magazine	1	Audio drama	
2012	present	Kuroneko Kareshi	Aya Sakyō	Shinshokan	9	Audio drama	
2013	2014	L'étranger de la Plage	Kanna Kii	Shodensha	1	Audio drama, anime film	
2014	present	L'étranger du Zéphyr	Kanna Kii	Shodensha	4	Audio drama	
2018		Liquor & Cigarettes	Ranmaru Zariya				
2005		Living For Tomorrow	Taishi Zaō	Shinshokan	1	—N/a	
2018	2021	Love Nest	Yuu Minaduki	Shinshokan	2	Audio Drama	
2003	present	Love Pistols	Tarako Kotobuki	Libre	9		
2005		Love Prism	Asami Tojo				
2010	2016	Love Stage!!	Eiki Eiki & Taishi Zaō	Kadokawa Shoten	7	Anime television series, live-action film	
2006	2006	Loving Gaze	Akira Kanbe	Libre	1		
2018	present	A Man Who Defies the World of BL	Konkici	Shodensha	5	Live-action television series	
2006		Maniac Shorts Shot	Miya Ousaka				
2007		Midnight Bloom	Rico Fukiyama	Shinshokan	1	—N/a	
2019	present	Minato's Laundromat	Yuzu Tsubaki & Sawa Kanzume	Media Factory	4	Live-action television series	
2015		Minori's Hand	Scarlet Beriko				
2011		Mr. Mini Mart	Junko	Tokuma Shoten	1	—N/a	
2019	present	Mr. Unlucky Has No Choice But to Kiss!	Gamoko Tsuyu	Libre	1	Live-action television series	
2020	present	My Personal Weatherman	Nikke Taino	NTT Solmare (digital), Libre (print)	1	Live-action television series, audio drama	
1995	1998	New York, New York	Marimo Ragawa	Hakusensha	4		
2013	2020	The Night Beyond the Tricornered Window	Tomoko Yamashita	Libre	10	Audio drama, live-action film	
2007	2008	No Touching At All	Kou Yoneda	Taiyoh Tosho	1	Audio drama, live-action film	
2019	present	Old-Fashioned Cupcake	Sagan Sagan	Taiyoh Tosho	2	Audio drama, live-action television series	
2017	2018	One Room Angel	Harada	Shodensha	1	Audio drama, live-action television series	
2005		Only You	Asami Tojo				
2010		Otokogokoro	Kanda Neko				
2015	2017	Our Dining Table	Ori Mita	Gentosha	1	Live-action television series	
2004		Pathos	Mika Sadahiro	Oakla Publishing	2		
2022	present	The Perfect Prince Loves Me, His Rival?!	Ao Yuki	Suiseisha	3	Anime television series	
2019	2020	Perfect Propose	Mayo Tsurukame	Kaiohsha	1	Audio drama, live-action television series	
2004		Physical Attraction	Tatsumi Kaiya				
2010		The Prince's Time	Junko	Taiyoh Tosho	1	—N/a	
2008	2012	Private Teacher!	Yuu Moegi	Core Magazine	4	Audio drama	
2021	present	Punks Triangle	Yuho Okita	Tokyo Mangasha, Homesha	2	Live-action television drama	
2013		Recipe no Ōji-sama	Junko				
2006	2006	Red	Sanae Rokuya	Taiyoh Tosho	1		
2016	2018	Restart After Coming Back Home	Cocomi	France Shoin	1	Live-action film	
2019	present	Restart After Being Hungry	Cocomi	France Shoin	1	—N/a	
2009		Rutta to Kodama	Youko Fujitani				
2007	2010	Sakura-Gari (Note: Sakura-Gari was serialized in Rinka, a spin-off of the josei manga magazine Monthly Flowers, but it was marketed as a boys' love series.)	Yuu Watase	Shogakukan	3		
2011		Same Difference	Nozomu Hiiragi			Live-action short film	
2016	Present	Sasaki and Miyano	Shō Harusono	Pixiv Comic	9	Anime television series	
2016		Sayonara Game	Yuu Minaduki	Shinshokan	1	Audio drama	
2019	2020	Senpai, This Can't Be Love!	Shinta Harekawa	Kadokawa	2	Audio drama, live-action television series	
2016	2017	Secret XXX	Meguru Hinohara	Shinshokan	1	Audio drama	
2006		Seduce Me After the Show	Est Em				
2007	2009	Seven Days	Venio Tachibana	Taiyoh Tosho	2	Live-action film	
2021		Shota Oni	Miyuki Nakamura	Square Enix	6	Anime	
2013		Special Delivery!	Momiji Akutagawa				
2006	2007	Steal Moon	Makoto Tateno	Nihon Bungeisha	2		
2005	2012	A Strange and Mystifying Story	Tsuta Suzuki	Libre	7		
2019	2019	Sugar Dog Life	Yoriko	Ichijinsha	1	Live-action television series	
2010	present	Super Lovers	Miyuki Abe	Kadokawa Shoten	13	Anime television series	
2016		Stray Bullet Baby	Kei Ichikawa				
2020	2022	Takara's Treasure	Minta Suzumaru	Shinshokan	1	Audio drama, live-action television series	
2013	2017	Ten Count	Rihito Takarai	Shinshokan	6	Audio drama, video game, OVA	
2017	2018	Therapy Game	Meguru Hinohara	Shinshokan	2	Audio drama	
2005		Thunderbolt Boys Excite	Asami Tojo				
2019	present	The Titan's Bride	Iktz	Suiseisha	1	Anime television series	
2018	present	Twilight Out of Focus	Jyanome	Kodansha	4	Audio drama, anime television series	
2008	present	Twittering Birds Never Fly	Kou Yoneda	Taiyoh Tosho	6	Audio drama, anime film	
2024	present	Unexpectedly Naughty Fukami	Ayaka Matsumoto	Suiseisha	4	Anime television series, live-action television series	
2007	2007	Wild Butterfly	Hiroki Kusumoto	Oakla Publishing	1		
2006	present	The World's Greatest First Love	Shungiku Nakamura	Kadokawa Shoten	19	Anime television series, light novel, anime film	
2012	present	Yarichin Bitch Club	Ogeretsu Tanaka	Gentosha	5	Original video animation	
2004	2008	Yebisu Celebrities	Kaoru Iwamoto & Shinri Fuwa	Biblos	6	Original video animation	
1995		Yume no Kodomo	Shouko Hamada				

== Other media ==
The following yaoi titles were originally published in a medium that was not manga or anime, but were later adapted into a manga or anime.

Year	Title	Creator(s)	Original medium	Adaptation(s)	Ref(s)
2020	2gether: The series	JittiRain	Novel	Live-action television series, manga	
1986	Ai no Kusabi	Rieko Yoshihara	Novel	Original video animation	
2003	Angel's Feather	BlueImpact	Video game	Manga, original video animation	
2006	Boys Love	Kaim Tachibana	Live-action film	Manga	
2014	Dramatical Murder	Nitro+chiral	Video game	Manga, anime television series	
2002	Enzai: Falsely Accused	Langmaor	Video game	Original video animation	
1994	Fujimi Orchestra	Kō Akizuki	Novel	Manga, original video animation	
2002	Gakuen Heaven	Spray	Video game	Novel, manga, anime television series	
2007	Kichiku Megane	Spray	Video game	Manga	
1999	Kiss in the Dark	Ken Nanbara	Novel	Original video animation	
2014	My Beautiful Man	Yuu Nagira	Light novel	Live-action television series, live-action film, audio drama, manga	
2002	No Money	Tohru Kousaka & Hitoyo Shinozaki	Light novel	Manga, original video animation	
2018	The Other World's Books Depend on the Bean Counter	Yatsuki Wakatsu	Light novel	Manga, anime television series	
2011	Steal!	Spray	Video game	Manga, light novel	
1992	Takumi-kun	Shinobu Gotoh	Novel	Audio drama, manga, live-action film, stage play	
2010	Togainu no Chi	Nitro+chiral	Video game	Manga, novel, anime television series	
2014	Yes, No, or Maybe?	Michi Ichiho	Light novel	Anime film	

== See also ==
- List of BL dramas
