= Fire in His Fingertips =

Japanese manga series

- Fire in His Fingertips: A Flirty Fireman Ravishes Me with His Smoldering Gaze
- Cover of the first manga tankōbon volume

指先から本気の熱情～チャラ男消防士はまっすぐな目で私を抱いた～ (Yubisaki kara Honki no Netsujō: Charao Shōbōshi wa Massugu na Me de Watashi wo Daita)
- Genre: Romance, teens' love
- Manga
- Written by: Tanishi Kawano
- Published by: Suiseisha
- English publisher: NA: Seven Seas Entertainment
- Imprint: Clair TL Comics
- Magazine: ComicFesta
- Original run: July 6, 2018 – August 1, 2025
- Volumes: 12
- Anime television series

Yubisaki kara Honki no Netsujō: Osana Najimi wa Shōbōshi
- Directed by: Toshihiro Watase
- Produced by: Mika Emoto; Spicy Saburou
- Written by: Tonbo
- Studio: Studio Hōkiboshi
- Licensed by: NA: Ascendent Animation
- Original network: Tokyo MX
- Original run: July 8, 2019 – September 1, 2019
- Episodes: 8
- Anime television series

Yubisaki kara Honki no Netsujō 2: Koibito wa Shōbōshi
- Directed by: Toshihiro Watase
- Produced by: Mika Emoto
- Written by: Eeyo Kurosaki
- Studio: Studio Hōkiboshi
- Licensed by: NA: Ascendent Animation
- Original network: Tokyo MX
- Original run: July 5, 2021 – August 23, 2021
- Episodes: 8

Fire in His Fingertips: A Flirty Fireman Ravishes Me with His Smoldering Gaze (Japanese: 指先から本気の熱情～チャラ男消防士はまっすぐな目で私を抱いた～, Hepburn: Yubisaki kara Honki no Netsujō: Charao Shōbōshi wa Massugu na Me de Watashi wo Daita) is a Japanese manga series by Tanishi Kawano. An anime adaptation by ComicFesta aired from July to September 2019 under the title Yubisaki kara Honki no Netsujō: Osana Najimi wa Shōbōshi (指先から本気の熱情-幼なじみは消防士-; lit. Fire in His Fingertips: My Childhood Friend is a Firefighter) in two versions. A second season aired from July to August 2021.

== Plot ==
Ryo Fujihashi, a 24-year-old office worker, is childhood friends with Souma Mizuno, a firefighter. She plans on setting him up with a co-worker from her office, but she assumes the reason why their dates fail is because of his womanizing ways. When Souma saves her when her apartment catches on fire, he offers her a place to stay. Ryo later learns that he has been in love with her for a long time.

== Characters ==
Ryou Fujihashi (藤橋 涼, Fujihashi Ryō)
Voiced by: Natsumi Takamori (standard version), Ion Momoyama (complete version) (Japanese); Amanda Parker (English)
Souma Mizuno (水野 颯馬, Mizuno Sōma)
Voiced by: Kent Itō (standard version), Margarine Tengu (complete version) (Japanese); Eli Brennan (English)
Yuki Izumi (泉 友貴, Izumi Yūki)
Voiced by: Tomohito Takatsuka (standard version), Kinniku Ii (complete version) (Japanese); Zack Maher (English)
Jun Hase (羽瀬 淳, Hase Jun)
Voiced by: Wataru Komada (standard version), Yū Asagi (complete version) (Japanese); Nicholas Andrew Louie (English)
Midori Watanabe (渡辺 翠, Watanabe Midori)
Voiced by: Mariko Honda (standard version), Ringo Aoba (complete version) (Japanese); Brittany Lauda (English)
Ayako Shinoda (篠田 彩子, Shinoda Ayako)
Voiced by: Shiori Izawa (standard version), Kiiro Tsukino (complete version) (Japanese); Rochelle Chiang (English)
Megumi Sasahara (笹原 恵美, Sasahara Megumi)
Voiced by: Akari Harashima (standard version), Shiu Kase (complete version) (Japanese); Kim Gasiciel (English)
Rei Hidaka (日高 玲, Hidaka Rei)
Voiced by: Shun'ichi Toki (standard version), Haru Amano (complete version) (Japanese); Sean Chiplock (English)
Akane Matsui (松井 茜, Matsui Akane)
Voiced by: Sakura Nakamura (standard version), Nerine Akimoto (complete version) (Japanese); Natalie Van Sistine (English)

== Media ==
=== Manga ===
Fire in His Fingertips: A Flirty Fireman Ravishes Me with His Smoldering Gaze is written and illustrated by Tanishi Kawano. It is serialized digitally on ComicFesta Zettai Ryōiki R! (a sub-label of the Screamo label) beginning in September 2018. It ended serialization on August 1, 2025. The chapters were released in 12 bound volumes by Suiseisha under the Clair TL Comics imprint.

In September 2019, Seven Seas Entertainment licensed the series in English for North American release under their adult imprint, Ghost Ship.

No.	Original release date	Original ISBN	English release date	English ISBN
1	January 18, 2019	978-4-43-425430-7	March 31, 2020	978-1-94780-479-1
2	July 18, 2019	978-4-43-426041-4	November 24, 2020	978-1-94780-478-4
3	February 18, 2020	978-4-43-426916-5	May 3, 2022	978-1-63858-108-6
4	November 18, 2020	978-4-43-427922-5	July 12, 2022	978-1-63858-361-5
5	June 18, 2021	978-4-43-428702-2; 978-4-43-428701-5 (SE)	November 12, 2024	978-1-63858-950-1
6	December 18, 2021	978-4-434-29440-2	January 7, 2025	978-1-68579-543-6
7	June 18, 2022	978-4-434-30140-7	March 11, 2025	979-8-88843-635-6
8	December 18, 2022	978-4-434-30932-8	May 13, 2025	979-8-89160-209-0
9	August 18, 2023	978-4-434-32077-4	August 12, 2025	979-8-89373-013-5
10	June 18, 2024	978-4-434-33658-4	December 2, 2025	979-8-89373-618-2
11	February 18, 2025	978-4-434-34917-1	March 10, 2026	979-8-89561-572-0
12	September 18, 2025	978-4-434-36016-9	October 27, 2026	979-8-89765-390-4

=== Anime ===
In May 2019, ComicFesta announced that they were creating an anime adaptation, with the title Yubisaki kara Honki no Netsujō: Osana Najimi wa Shōbōshi (指先から本気の熱情-幼なじみは消防士-; lit. Fire in His Fingertips: My Childhood Friend is a Firefighter), and aired from July 8 to September 1, 2019, on Tokyo MX. The anime is produced by Studio Hōkiboshi, with Toshihiro Watase as director, Tombo as scriptwriter, and Katsuyuki Sato as the animation director. Like ComicFesta's other series, two versions of the anime were produced with different cast members: a standard version for television broadcast, and a complete version including sexual content for streaming on ComicFesta Anime's website. The theme song is "Blazing Luv!!" by Sakuragaoka Fire Brigade, which is composed of the voice actors for Souma, Yuki, and Jun. The same song is performed in the complete version by Tri Fighter, consisting of the complete version's voice cast.

A second season has been announced and aired from July 5 to August 23, 2021. The cast and staff will return to reprise their roles.

On December 1, 2021, it was announced that both seasons of the anime will receive an English dub produced by Ascendent Animation.

==== My Childhood Friend is a Firefighter ====
No. overall	No. in season	Title	Directed by	Written by	Storyboarded by	Original release date (Note: Episodes are released on AnimeFesta every Monday at 12:00 a.m. JST, an hour before the original air time on television.)
1	1	"Tonight, Wanna Stay at... My Place?"; Transliteration: "Kon'ya, Orenchi... Kuru?" (Japanese: 今夜、俺んち…来る？)	Toshihiro Watase	Tombo	Toshihiro Watase	July 8, 2019
2	2	"I'm Only Taking a Shower... but it Feels Good?"; Transliteration: "Shawā Shiteru Dake na no ni... Kimochi i?" (Japanese: シャワーしてるだけなのに…きもちい？)	Rei Ishikura	Tombo	Rei Ishikura	July 15, 2019
3	3	"I Won't Stop Until You Tell Me What You're Hiding."; Transliteration: "Omae ga Kakushi Goto Hanasu Made, Yamenē." (Japanese: おまえが隠しごと話すまで、止めねぇ。)	Toshihiro Watase	Tombo	Toshihiro Watase	July 22, 2019
4	4	"How Can I Hold Back When You're Showing Off Such a Sexy Yukata."; Transliteration: "Sonna Iroppoi Yukata Sugata Miserarete, Gaman Dekiru ka yo." (Japanese: そんな色っぽい浴衣姿見せられて、我慢できるかよ。)	Toshihiro Watase	Tombo	Toshihiro Watase	July 29, 2019
5	5	"I Can't Stay Quiet When You're Calling Out to Other Guys......."; Transliteration: "Hoka no Otoko ga Koe Kakeru no, Damatte Mitenakya Ikenai Nante......." (Japanese: 他の男が声掛けるの、黙って見てなきゃいけないなんて……。)	Rei Ishikura	Tombo	Rei Ishikura	August 5, 2019
6	6	"No One's Coming to the Pool at Night...... Right?"; Transliteration: "Yoru no Pūru Nante, Dare mo Konai...... Daro?" (Japanese: 夜のプールなんて、誰も来ない……だろ？)	Rei Ishikura	Tombo	Rei Ishikura	August 12, 2019
7	7	"I'll Definitely Save You."; Transliteration: "Zettai ni Tasukeru Kara." (Japanese: 絶対に助けるから。)	Toshihiro Watase	Tombo	Toshihiro Watase	August 26, 2019
8	8	"Now, Look at Only Me."; Transliteration: "Ima wa Ore no Koto Dake Mitero." (Japanese: 今は俺のことだけ見てろ。)	Toshihiro Watase	Tombo	Toshihiro Watase	September 1, 2019

==== My Boyfriend is a Firefighter ====
No. overall	No. in season	Title	Directed by	Written by	Storyboarded by	Original release date
9	1	"Happy, Birthday."; Transliteration: "Tanjōbi, Omedetō." (Japanese: 誕生日、おめでとう。)	Toshihiro Watase	Eeyo Kurosaki	Toshihiro Watase	July 5, 2021
10	2	"Therefore, Charge Ryo Firmly."; Transliteration: "Da Kara, Shikkari Ryō o Jūden Shitoku." (Japanese: だから、しっかり涼を充電しとく。)	Toshihiro Watase	Eeyo Kurosaki	Toshihiro Watase	July 12, 2021
11	3	"I Want a Reward for my Hard Work, Right Now."; Transliteration: "Ganbatta Gohōbi ga Hoshii, Ima Sugu." (Japanese: 頑張ったご褒美がほしい、今すぐ。)	Ryū Motoyama	Eeyo Kurosaki	Kana Kawana	July 19, 2021
12	4	"You Can Just Call me As It Is."; Transliteration: "Sonomama Denwa Shite Ii yo." (Japanese: そのまま電話していいよ。)	Ryū Motoyama	Eeyo Kurosaki	Kana Kawana	July 26, 2021
13	5	"It's My Girlfriend. I'll Never Let Her Go."; Transliteration: "Ore no Kanojo da. Zettai ni Watasanē." (Japanese: 俺の彼女だ。絶対に渡さねえ。)	Ryū Motoyama	Eeyo Kurosaki	Kana Kawana	August 2, 2021
14	6	"How Much Do You Like It, Tell me With a Kiss."; Transliteration: "Dorekurai Suki ka, Kisu de Oshiete." (Japanese: どれくらい好きか、キスで教えて。)	Ryū Motoyama	Eeyo Kurosaki	Toshihiro Watase	August 9, 2021
15	7	"I Want to Hear it Once Again. You Will Regret Not Saying it." Transliteration: "Mō Ikkai kikitai. Iwanai to Kōkaisaseru." (Japanese: もう一回聞きたい。言わないと後悔させる。)	Toshihiro Watase	Eeyo Kurosaki	Toshihiro Watase	August 16, 2021
16	8	"I Used To Be a Childhood Friend Back Then, But Now I'm a Boyfriend."; Transliteration: "Ano Koro wa Osananajimi Datta Kedo, Ima wa Koibitotte Koto ga." (Japanese: あの頃は幼馴染だったけど、今は恋人ってことが。)	Toshihiro Watase	Eeyo Kurosaki	Toshihiro Watase	August 23, 2021

== Reception ==
Rebecca Silverman from Anime News Network felt that the first volume was a "fun contemporary romance" for adult women aside from yaoi manga and claimed Ryo was a strong female lead; however, she also warned that there were some non-consensual scenes.
