= My Matchmaking Partner Is My Student and a Troublemaker =

Japanese manga series

- First tankōbon volume cover

お見合い相手は教え子、強気な、問題児。 (Omiai Aite wa Oshiego, Tsuyoki na, Mondaiji.)
- Genre: Teens' love; Erotic romance
- Manga
- Written by: Sigma Torai
- Published by: Screamo (digital); Seiunsha (print)
- English publisher: Coolmic
- Imprint: TL Screamo (digital); Clair TL Comics (print)
- Magazine: ComicFesta
- Original run: November 15, 2015 – March 17, 2019
- Volumes: 5
- Anime television series

My Matchmaking Partner Is a Student, An Aggressive Troublemaker
- Directed by: Saburō Miura
- Written by: Saburō Miura
- Studio: Seven
- Licensed by: Coolmic
- Original network: Tokyo MX, KBS Kyoto, AT-X
- Original run: October 2, 2017 – December 18, 2017
- Episodes: 12

My Matchmaking Partner Is My Student and a Troublemaker (お見合い相手は教え子、強気な、問題児。, Omiai Aite wa Oshiego, Tsuyoki na, Mondaiji.) is a Japanese manga series written and illustrated by Sigma Torai. It was serialized on Screamo's ComicFesta service from November 2015 to March 2019. A short-form anime television series adaptation produced by Seven aired from October to December 2017.

== Characters ==
Nana Saigawa (斉川 菜乃, Saigawa Nana)
Voiced by: Rina Honnizumi (TV version), Miu Aoi (complete version)
Shūji Kuga (久我 宗二, Kuga Shūji)
Voiced by: Yusuke Shirai (TV version), Tetsuto Furukawa (complete version)
Sōichirō Takamiya (高宮 宗一郎, Takamiya Sōichirō)
Voiced by: Tarusuke Shingaki (TV version), Makoto Sakurai (complete version)

== Media ==
=== Manga ===
Written and illustrated by Sigma Torai, My Matchmaking Partner Is My Student and a Troublemaker was serialized on Screamo's ComicFesta service from November 15, 2015, to March 17, 2019. Its chapters were compiled by Seiunsha into five tankōbon volumes released from September 18, 2016, to June 18, 2019. The manga is licensed in English by Coolmic.

| No. | Release date | ISBN |
|---|---|---|
| 1 | September 18, 2016 | 978-4-434-22191-0 |
| 2 | April 18, 2017 | 978-4-434-23043-1 |
| 3 | October 18, 2017 | 978-4-434-23603-7 |
| 4 | June 18, 2018 | 978-4-434-24646-3 |
| 5 | June 18, 2019 | 978-4-434-25944-9 |

=== Anime ===
A short-form anime television series adaptation produced by Seven aired for twelve episodes from October 2 to December 18, 2017, on Tokyo MX and other channels, with ComicFesta streaming a complete hentai version. The series is directed and written by Saburō Miura, with Binme serving as character designer and chief animation director. The anime's theme song is "My one" performed by Saki Hazuki. Coolmic streamed the series under the title My Matchmaking Partner Is a Student, An Aggressive Troublemaker.

== See also ==
- Sono Keisatsukan, Tokidoki Yajū!, another manga series by the same author
