= Hot Limit =

Hot Limit may refer to:

- Hot Limit (song), T.M.Revolution (Takanori Nishikawa)'s 1998 song covered by High and Mighty Color
- Hot Limit (manga), a Japanese manga
