= On a Lustful Night Mingling with a Priest =

Japanese manga and anime series

- First volume cover

僧侶と交わる色欲の夜に… (Sōryo to Majiwaru Shikiyoku no Yoru ni...)
- Genre: Teens' love
- Manga
- Written by: Reon Maomi
- Published by: Suiseisha
- English publisher: BookWalker
- Imprint: Clair TL Comics
- Magazine: ComicFesta; MechaComic; Comic Seymoar
- Original run: June 2, 2014 – June 28, 2025
- Volumes: 11
- Anime television series
- Directed by: Hideki Araki
- Written by: Makoto Takada
- Studio: Seven
- Licensed by: Coolmic
- Original network: Tokyo MX, AT-X
- Original run: April 2, 2017 – June 18, 2017
- Episodes: 12

On a Lustful Night Mingling with a Priest (僧侶と交わる色欲の夜に…, Sōryo to Majiwaru Shikiyoku no Yoru ni...) is a Japanese Teens' love (TL) manga written and illustrated by Reon Maomi.

== Plot ==
At a class reunion, college student Mio Fukatani has met her highschool classmate Takahide Kujō again since the past few years. She discovers that her first love is now bald and has taken over his family's temple as a priest. Even though she thought that her first love has no interest in romantic relationship due to his religious background, a passionate night ignites between the two of them.

== Characters ==
Mio Fukatani (深谷 美桜, Fukatani Mio)
Voiced by: Maika Hara
Mio is the protagonist and a 4th year college student who has been in love with Takahide ever since high school.
Takahide Kujō (九条 隆秀)
Voiced by: Yō Suzuki
Takahide is a priest with strong sadistic tendencies, but romantically awkward.
Yukitaka Kujō (九条 雪秀)
Voiced by: Ren'ya Kojita
Yukitaka is Takahide's younger brother who attends the same school as Mio. Not wanting to get himself involved in his family's traditions, he left home to live his own life the way he wants; he is later revealed to have feelings for Mio, much to his older brother's jealousy.
Kiyotaka Kujō (九条 清隆)
Voiced by: Pāma Kurukuru
Kiyotaka is the temple's priest. He is also Shiori's husband and the father of Takahide and Yukitaka.
Shiori Kujō (九条 栞)
Voiced by: Nerine Akiyama
Shiori is Kiyotaka's loving beautiful wife and the mother of Takahide and Yukitaka. She is fully supportive of her children's decisions no matter what they are.

== Media ==
=== Manga ===
The manga is digitally serialized at W Comics ZR's Jun'ai Kakumei G! in June 2014 via W Comics. The first volume was released in June 2015. The third volume was released by publisher Seiunsha's Clair TL Comics in June 2016, and W Comics ZR released the 10th volume. The series ended on June 28, 2025, with 64 chapters.

==== Volumes ====
No.	Release date	ISBN
1	June 19, 2015	978-4-434-20470-8
2	October 19, 2015	978-4-434-20967-3
3	June 18, 2016	978-4-434-21826-2
4	April 18, 2017	978-4-434-23044-8
5	June 18, 2018	978-4-434-24644-9
6	May 18, 2019	978-4-434-25851-0
7	August 18, 2020	978-4-434-27686-6
8	December 18, 2021	978-4-434-29439-6
9	June 18, 2023	978-4-434-31804-7
10	December 18, 2024	978-4-434-34550-0
11	November 18, 2025	978-4-434-36322-1

=== Anime ===
It was announced in January 2017 that it would have an anime adaptation. The anime is directed by Hideki Araki at studio Seven, with series composition by Makoto Takada. Mizuki Aoba adapts Reon Maomi's art into animation and Hisayoshi Hirasawa is the sound director. The anime is broadcast on Tokyo MX with 12 episodes, each in 3–5 minutes. Confetti Smile sings the opening theme titled "Meaning of Life". The anime has 3 versions: general version for regular TV audiences, an R15 version that is broadcast in AT-X, and an R18 version that can be digitally rented via ComicFesta Anime Zone.

==== Episode list ====
No.	Title (Note: All English titles are literal translations.)	Original release date
1	"Before Being A Priest, I'm A Man Too" "Sōryo no mae ni… Oredatte otoko da yo" (僧侶の前に…俺だって男だよ)	April 2, 2017
2	"Even Monks will Fall in Love, Get Married, and Also..." "Sōryo datte, ren'ai surushi, kekkon mo surushi, sore ni…" (僧侶だって、恋愛するし、結婚もするし、それに…)	April 9, 2017
3	"It Doesn't Seem Like our Body Compatibility is Bad" "Karada no aishō wa warukuna-sa-sōda to omottandakedo" (カラダの相性は悪くなさそうだと思ったんだけど)	April 16, 2017
4	"... Do You Not Want Me to Touch You?" "…… Ore ni sawarareru no wa…… iya?" (……俺に触られるのは……いや?)	April 23, 2017
5	"Don't Think About Anything ―― Do You Think They Do That Kind of Thing?" "Ore ga nani mo kangaenaide ―― ā iu koto shi teru to omou?" (俺が何も考えないで――ああいう事してると思う?)	April 30, 2017
6	"I Like It Too. I Like It" "Ore ga suki. Sukida" (俺も好き。好きだ)	May 7, 2017
7	"Let Me Take It Off. Look At Me" "Nusagete. Mu, mi nagara" (脱がせて。目、見ながら)	May 14, 2017
8	"Can I Check if There's Love Between us?" "Oretachi no ma ni ai ga aru ka, tashikamete mo ii?" (俺達の間に愛があるか、確かめてもいい？)	May 21, 2017
9	"It's Just a Child" "Kodomo nandayo" (子どもなんだよ)	May 28, 2017
10	"Fukaya is Mine" "Fukaya wa, Ore no monda" (深谷は、俺のものだ)	June 4, 2017
11	"I Don't Want to Give it to Anyone" "Darenimo watashitakunai" (自分が苦しんで初めて人の苦しみがわかる)	June 11, 2017
12	"Fukaya and Kujō's Love Love Diary" "Fukaya to Kujō no raburabu nikki" (誰にも渡したくない)	June 18, 2017
