= DramaQueen =

American publishing company

- Company type: Limited liability company
- Industry: manga
- Genre: Boy's Love, Romance, Action
- Founded: 2005
- Founder: Tran Nguyen
- Headquarters: Houston
- Website: www.onedramaqueen.com

DramaQueen is a Houston-based English-language publisher of domestic, Japanese, Korean, and Taiwanese comics founded in 2005. DramaQueen also publishes an original English-language yaoi anthology called Rush, which made its debut in 2006. RUSH ceased publishing when the company experienced financial issues and were uncommunicative with the creators involved in the project. In March 2010, after a four-year hiatus from publishing, during which time the company lost some of its Japanese licenses, Dramaqueen released the BL manhwa The Summit by Lee Young-hee. On their forums, CEO Tran Nguyen indicated RUSH would return in a new format in 2011.

== Titles ==
- Brother by Yuzuha Ougi
- Lies & Kisses by Masara Minase
- Not Love by Kano Miyamoto
- Invoke by Kiriko Higashizato
- Omen by Makoto Tateno
- Empty Heart by Masara Minase
- Missing Road by Shushushu Sakurai
- Cage of Thorns by Sonoko Sakuragawa
- Angel or Devil? by Jun Uzuki
- Challengers by Hinako Takanaga
- The Judged by Akira Honma
- Scent of Temptation by Mako Toyama (release June 2008)
- White Guardian by Duo Brand.
- Crimson Wind by Duo Brand.
- Last Portrait by Akira Honma
- Sweetheart by Seika Kisaragi
- Instinctively a Man by Takashi Kanzaki (release June 2008)
- Awakening Desires by Bohra Naono (release April 2008)
- Allure by Yuri Ebihara
- Temptation by Momiji Maeda (release April 2008)
- Here comes the Wolf?!! by Yōichirō Kōga (release June 2008)
- 10K¥ Lover by Dr. Ten
- Audition by Chon Kye-young
- DVD by Chon Kye-young
- Devil x Devil by Sachiyo Sawauchi
- 8mm by You Na
- Peter Panda by Na Yae-ri
- Promise by Lee Eun-young
- Mandayuu and Me by Shushushu Sakurai
- Lovely Sick by Shoko Ohmine
- Naked Jewels Corporation by Shushushu Sakurai
- Virtuoso di Amore by Uki Ogasawara
- Your Honest Deceit by Sakufu Ajimine
- The Summit by Lee Young-hee
