= Osake ni Yowai Andō-san =

Japanese manga series

- First tankōbon volume cover

お酒によわい安藤さん
- Genre: Boys' love; Romantic comedy
- Manga
- Written by: Umiko Seto
- Published by: WWWave Corporation (online); Suiseisha (print)
- Imprint: Continuer
- Magazine: ComicFesta
- Original run: October 19, 2024 – present
- Volumes: 2
- Anime television series

Osake ni Yowai Andō-san (お酒によわい安藤さん; lit. 'The Alcohol-Lightweight Andō-san') is a Japanese manga series written and illustrated by Umiko Seto. It has been serialized online via WWWave Corporation's ComicFesta website under its Continuer boys' love label since October 2024 and has been collected in two tankōbon volumes by Suiseisha as of September 2026. An anime television series adaptation has been announced.

== Media ==
=== Manga ===
No.	Japanese release date	Japanese ISBN
1	November 18, 2025	978-4-434-36326-9
2	September 18, 2026	978-4-434-38024-2

=== Anime ===
An anime television series adaptation was announced on August 12, 2026.
