= Sono Keisatsukan, Tokidoki Yajū! =

2019 Japanese manga

- First tankōbon volume cover

その警察官、ときどき野獣！
- Genre: Teens' love, erotic romance
- Manga
- Written by: Sigma Torai
- Published by: Ichijinsha
- Imprint: LB Comics
- Magazine: Lovebites
- Original run: December 1, 2019 – February 1, 2025
- Volumes: 10
- Manga

Zoku: Sono Keisatsukan, Tokidoki Yajū!
- Written by: Sigma Torai
- Published by: Oakla Publishing
- Imprint: Oakla Comics Minty Comics
- Magazine: Minty
- Original run: August 18, 2025 – present
- Volumes: 3

Sono Keisatsukan, Tokidoki Yajū! (その警察官、ときどき野獣！; lit. "That Policeman, Sometimes a Beast!") is a Japanese teens' love manga series written and illustrated by Sigma Torai. It was serialized online via NTT Solmare's Comic CMoa website under Ichijinsha's Lovebites teens' love brand from December 2019 to February 2025 and was collected in ten tankōbon volumes. A sequel series, titled Zoku: Sono Keisatsukan, Tokidoki Yajū!, began serialization on the same website under Oakla Publishing's Minty brand in August 2025.

== Media ==
=== Manga ===
Written and illustrated by Sigma Torai, Sono Keisatsukan, Tokidoki Yajū! was serialized on NTT Solmare's Comic CMoa website under Ichijinsha's Lovebites teens' love brand from December 1, 2019, to February 1, 2025. Its chapters were compiled into ten tankōbon volumes released from August 3, 2020, to April 1, 2025.

A sequel series, titled Zoku: Sono Keisatsukan, Tokidoki Yajū! (続・その警察官、ときどき野獣！), began serialization on the same website under Oakla Publishing's Minty brand on August 18, 2025. The sequel's chapters have been compiled into three tankōbon volumes as of July 2026.

==== Volumes ====
No.	Release date	ISBN
1	August 3, 2020	978-4-7580-2139-5
2	October 1, 2020	978-4-7580-2155-5
3	March 1, 2021	978-4-7580-2206-4
4	September 1, 2021	978-4-7580-2275-0
5	January 28, 2022	978-4-7580-2349-8; 978-4-7580-2350-4 (SE)
6	November 1, 2022	978-4-7580-2455-6
7	August 1, 2023	978-4-7580-2557-7
8	April 1, 2024	978-4-7580-2677-2
9	November 1, 2024	978-4-7580-2809-7
10	April 1, 2025	978-4-7580-2857-8

==== Zoku: Sono Keisatsukan, Tokidoki Yajū! ====
No.	Release date	ISBN
1	January 14, 2026	978-4-7755-3053-5
2	January 14, 2026	978-4-7755-3054-2
3	July 14, 2026	978-4-7755-3061-0

=== Cancelled anime ===
An anime television series adaptation was announced on March 27, 2025, and was set to premiere in 2025. The series was to be produced by Rabbit Gate and directed and written by Saburō Miura, with Kazuhiro Toda serving as chief director, Yukihiro Makino serving as assistant director, and Haruna Kamiyama designing the characters. However, the series was cancelled on August 4, 2025, due to "various circumstances".

== Reception ==
By March 2025, the series had over 2 million copies in circulation.

== See also ==
- My Matchmaking Partner Is My Student and a Troublemaker, another manga series by the same author
