= Yellow (manga) =

Four-volume yaoi manga by Makoto Tateno

- Genre: Yaoi
- Manga
- Written by: Makoto Tateno
- Published by: Biblos
- English publisher: NA: Digital Manga Publishing
- Magazine: Magazine Be × Boy
- Original run: 4 October 2001 – 2004
- Volumes: 4

Yellow is a four-volume yaoi manga by Makoto Tateno, published in English by Digital Manga Publishing. It tells the story of two elite drug "snatchers" (couriers), Taki and Goh, mainly about the love and adventures they share together.

This manga does not involve a seme-uke relationship that is commonly present in and/or attributed to the genre of boys' love. Instead, both males are represented as equals in terms of power and physical appearance. Taki is actually presented as decidedly heterosexual while Goh is a homosexual. In the sexual aspect of the manga, it mainly focuses on Goh's insistent advances on Taki, and Taki's subsequent reluctance.

The title "Yellow" means to represent their relationship and their job because of the colors of a traffic light: green means go, red means stop, and yellow is a warning of risk. The manga itself is a blend of adventure, romance, and high tension.

== Characters ==
Goh: Drug snatcher extraordinaire, has a bad habit of falling for his partners.

Taki: Goh's latest partner. He has a past that may catch up to him.

== Reception ==
The couple has been described as a "will they, won't they" couple. The art has been criticised as a little raw, but the story has more to it than the characters' relationship. It has been described as "FAKE by any other name." Julie Rosato felt the beginning "had potential", and enjoyed the character designs of the leads. Rosato enjoyed the broader scope of the third volume, but felt the ending was too pat.
