= King of Cards (manga) =

Japanese manga series

- Cover of the first manga volume featuring Minami and Tamotsu.

カードの王様 (Kādo no Ōsama)
- Manga
- Written by: Makoto Tateno
- Published by: Hakusensha
- English publisher: CMX Manga
- Magazine: Bessatsu Hana to Yume
- Original run: 1999 – 2004
- Volumes: 9

King of Cards (Japanese: カードの王様, Hepburn: Kādo no Ōsama) is a Japanese manga series written and illustrated by Makoto Tateno.

== Premise ==
A high school student named Manami Minami is a beginner at the new line Trading Card Game, Chaos. Through a great stroke of luck, she obtains "Saghan the Mighty Sorcerer", an ultra rare card that is supposedly out of print. Now suddenly, every Chaos player in Japan is after Manami, attempting to take Saghan from her in a duel. Manami must balance her gamer life with her normal life as she works to win, with help from her cousin Tamotsu and her friends/rivals Miyako and Ko.

== Reception ==
Manga Life did not think highly of this manga. Dan Polley gave King of Cards a negative review, saying that the Volume I plot twist felt forced and "jarring". Lori Henderson, reviewing Volume II, noted that the series was more character-driven than most game-related manga, but that it failed to offer anything new or original to either genre.
