= Everything for Demon King Evelogia =

Japanese manga series

- Cover of vol. 1 of the Japanese version

魔王イブロギアに身を捧げよ (Maō Iburogia ni Mi o Sasage yo)
- Genre: Boys' love, fantasy, isekai
- Manga
- Written by: Io Kaziwara (Note: Kaziwara's surname is romanized as "Kajiwara" in the print releases by Seven Seas Entertainment.)
- Published by: Suiseisha
- English publisher: Coolmic (digital); Seven Seas Entertainment (print)
- Imprint: Glanz BL Comics
- Magazine: ComicFesta
- Original run: April 16, 2020 – present
- Volumes: 9
- Anime television series
- Directed by: Sanae Nagi
- Written by: Sanae Nagi; Ēyo Kurosaki
- Music by: Ayako Misawa; Black Flag
- Studio: Studio Hōkiboshi
- Licensed by: Ascendent Animation
- Original network: AnimeFesta (premium version); Tokyo MX, BS11 (standard version)
- Original run: October 2, 2021 – November 27, 2021
- Episodes: 9
- icon

Everything for Demon King Evelogia (Japanese: 魔王イブロギアに身を捧げよ, Hepburn: Maō Iburogia ni Mi o Sasage yo; serialized as Reincarnated into Demon King Evelogia's World in English) is a Japanese manga series by Io Kaziwara. It is serialized digitally on the website ComicFesta since April 16, 2020. An anime adaptation was broadcast from October 2, 2021, to November 27, 2021, with a premium version for online streaming and a standard version for television broadcast.

== Plot ==
The story begins with Toshiaki Gozu, a man who has fallen from society, dying and subsequently reincarnating as a background character in a fantasy video game that he was enamored with in his childhood. Gozu encounters a younger form of Evelogia, the last boss of the game and Gozu's favorite character. In the story, Eve begins his start of darkness by accidentally injuring the background character; however, Gozu alters the course of the story by confessing to Eve that he is in love with him. Together, Gozu and Eve set out to destroy the world and prevent the game's hero from defeating Eve.

== Characters ==
Evelogia (イブロギア, Iburogia; also spelled Ibrogia)
Voiced by: Shun Horie (Japanese); Ciarán Strange (English)
Nicknamed Eve (イブ, Ibu), he is the Demon King and final boss of the game. Eve had his start of darkness when he accidentally injures a background character, instilling fear in his village and family. Eve has a "small and cute appearance", while Gozu describes him as "cool".
Gozu (ゴズ)
Voiced by: Takuya Satō (Japanese); Patrick M. Seymour (English)
Gozu, whose real name is Toshiaki Gozu (牛頭利晃, Gozu Toshiaki), is a bold and aggressive man. He is reincarnated as a background character into a fantasy video game that he had admired in his childhood. He is described as "voluptuous" and "sexy".
MacKiddie (マキディー, Makidī)
Voiced by: Hiroki Yasumoto (Japanese); Will de Renzy-Martin (English)
MacKiddie is a fighter-class character who is a member of the hero's party in the original game. He originally joins the hero after he fails to stop a dragon from destroying his hometown; however, the course of the story is changed after Eve slays the dragon. MacKiddie falls in love with Eve. Kaziwara stated in 2021 that she found MacKiddie "cute" and described him as "straightforward". In addition, she enjoyed his character design.
Odigos (オディゴス, Odigosu; spelled Odigoth in the Seven Seas print release)
Odigos is a mage-class character who is a member of the hero's party in the original game. A powerful magician, he is a teacher of an academy specializing in magic and maintains the magical barrier surrounding his town. Believing that Eve summoned Gozu into the world, Odigos forces them to attend the academy for a month in hopes of learning summoning magic in order to obtain mana shards to revive his grandmother. In the original story, he leaves the academy and is the final character to join the hero after the death of his grandmother; however, the course of the story is changed after Gozu is able to obtain a mana shard. Kaziwara describes him as the template of a "brilliant and cheeky tsun tsun shota" character. Originally, she had planned on making Odigos fall in love with Gozu, but because of Eve and Gozu's personalities, she felt that a love triangle between them would not work out.
Kiriki (キリキ)
Kiriki is a saintess-class character who is a member of the hero's party and female in the original game. Gozu and Eve seek him to remove the Demon King's curse from Gozu.
Tishia (ティシア)
Voiced by: Hitomi Nabatame (Japanese); Elsie Lovelock (English)
Tishia is the maiden sacrifice from her village sent to wed the Demon King. In the original game, she was Eve's first sexual relationship after he turned to darkness and eventually birthed monsters. After Gozu changes the course of the story, Eve rejects her and she flees the forest away from the monsters in disgust over Eve.

== Media ==
=== Manga ===
Everything for Demon King Evelogia is written and illustrated by Io Kaziwara. It is serialized on the website ComicFesta under the Screamo label, as well as the mobile app Mecha Comic, since April 16, 2020. The chapters have been released in eight bound volumes by Suiseisha under the Glanz BL Comics imprint. The manga is serialized in English by Coolmic in webtoon format under the title Reincarnated into Demon King Evelogia's World. On July 30, 2025, Seven Seas Entertainment announced that they would be releasing the series in print.

In 2021, Kaziwara stated through an interview with Chil Chil that she enjoyed creating the costumes for the series; however, due to the amount of artistic detail in the manga, she developed severe tendonitis while drawing the first volume. Regarding the second volume, Kaziwara mentioned that Panopia, the owner of the armor shop, became one of her favorite characters and that because he was the first dark-skinned character in her work, she felt his design was "fresh" and "fun to draw." Kaziwara stated that the dance scene was her favorite scene in the volume, as she had envisioned drawing a dance scene where two characters "hold hands and dance." As the characters received new outfits, Kaziwara stated she enjoyed designing them, but because she wasn't used to drawing them, she often missed details and colors. She stated that Gozu's new outfit was MacKiddie's in the original game. For the third volume, Kaziwara paid particular attention to Gozu's expressions. Her favorite and most difficult scene to draw was the dining hall scene due to amount of background characters.

==== Volumes ====
No.	Original release date	Original ISBN	English release date	English ISBN
1	February 18, 2021	978-4-434-28282-9; 978-4-434-28283-6 (LE)	April 21, 2026	979-8-89765-264-8
2	October 18, 2021	978-4-434-29188-3	August 4, 2026	979-8-89765-265-5
3	October 18, 2022	978-4-434-30644-0; 978-4-434-30645-7 (LE)	November 17, 2026	979-8-89765-266-2
4	May 18, 2023	978-4-434-31680-7; 978-4-434-31681-4 (LE)	March 16, 2027	979-8-89765-569-4
5	November 17, 2023	978-4-434-32534-2; 978-4-434-32535-9 (LE)	—	—
6	September 18, 2024	978-4-434-34105-2	—	—
7	March 18, 2025	978-4-434-35063-4	—	—
8	September 18, 2025	978-4-434-36019-0	—	—
9	July 17, 2026	978-4-434-37733-4	—	—

=== Anime ===
On February 15, 2021, ComicFesta announced they were producing an anime adaptation of Everything for Demon King Evelogia. The anime adaptation is animated by Studio Hōkiboshi. Two versions of the anime were produced: a standard version for television broadcast and a premium version including sexual content for streaming on AnimeFesta's website. The premium version was released on AnimeFesta's website from October 2, 2021, to November 27, 2021. The standard version was broadcast on Tokyo MX. (Note: Tokyo MX lists the premiere date as October 1, 2021, at 25:00, which is October 2, 2021, at 1:00 a.m.) Additional broadcasts include BS 11.

The cast from the audio drama adaptation, which had been bundled as an extra of the limited edition of the manga's first volume, reprised their roles. The anime adaptation is directed and written by Sanae Nagi, with Ēyo Kurosaki as an additional writer. Yōko Iwakura is in charge of character design. Iwakura, along with Nao Nakamoto, are in charge of animation direction. Ayako Misawa is in charge of music direction, with Black Flag producing the soundtrack. The theme song is "Change the World" by Shun Horie and Takuya Satō as their characters.

On December 7, 2021, Ascendent Animation had licensed the anime adaptation. They also announced that they were producing an English-language dub. The English dub was released on Blu-ray and for streaming on Amazon Prime Video on October 24, 2022.

==== Episodes ====
No.	Title (Note: All English titles are taken from Coolmic.)	Directed by	Written by	Original release date
1	"Meet the Demon King"; Transliteration: "Maō-sama to Gotaimen" (Japanese: 魔王サマとご対面)	Motohiko Niwa	Sanae Nagi	October 2, 2021
2	"Kill the Demon King"; Transliteration: "Maō-sama Satsugai Keikaku" (Japanese: 魔王サマ殺害計画)	Motohiko Niwa	Sanae Nagi	October 9, 2021
3	"Love the Demon King"; Transliteration: "Maō-sama ni Kyūaichū" (Japanese: 魔王サマに求愛中)	kamisiro	Sanae Nagi	October 16, 2021
4	"Proposed by the Demon King"; Transliteration: "Maō-sama kara no Puropōzu" (Japanese: 魔王サマからのプロポーズ)	kamisiro	Sanae Nagi	October 23, 2021
5	"Honeymoon with the Demon King"; Transliteration: "Maō-sama to Konzen Ryokō" (Japanese: 魔王サマと婚前旅行)	Toshiyuki Sone	Eeyo Kurosaki	October 30, 2021
6	"The Angry Demon King"; Transliteration: "Maō-sama wa Gorippuku" (Japanese: 魔王サマはご立腹)	Motohiko Niwa	Eeyo Kurosaki	November 6, 2021
7	"Visit by the Demon King"; Transliteration: "Maō-sama to Nazo no Machi" (Japanese: 魔王サマと謎の町)	Motohiko Niwa	Eeyo Kurosaki	November 13, 2021
8	"The Fighter & the Demon King"; Transliteration: "Maō-sama to Kakutōka" (Japanese: 魔王サマと格闘家)	Motohiko Niwa	Eeyo Kurosaki	November 20, 2021
9	"Dance with the Demon King"; Transliteration: "Maō-sama to Odoru Yoru" (Japanese: 魔王サマと踊る夜)	Motohiko Niwa	Eeyo Kurosaki	November 27, 2021
