= Akari Harashima =

Japanese voice actress and singer

- 原嶋 あかり
- Born: 9 March 1990 (age 36)
- Occupations: Voice actress; singer
- Years active: 2011–present
- Agent: Tokyo Actor's Consumer's Cooperative Society
- Notable work: The Idolmaster Million Live! as Iku Nakatani; Fire in His Fingertips as Megumi Sasahara

Akari Harashima (Japanese: 原嶋 あかり, Hepburn: Harashima Akari; born 9 March 1990) is a Japanese voice actress and singer affiliated with Tokyo Actor's Consumer's Cooperative Society. She is known for voicing Iku Nakatani in The Idolmaster Million Live! and Megumi Sasahara in Fire in His Fingertips.

== Biography ==
Akari Harashima, a native of Hokkaido, was born on 9 March 1990. As an elementary school student, she decided to pursue a career as a voice actor after her older sister, an anime lover, said that it was an interesting career. Although there was a voice acting school in her prefecture of origin, she planned to move to Tokyo, which her mother vetoed until the former was in junior high school.

Harashima entered the Amusement Media Academy as a 15th generation student while studying in high school. She joined Aoni Production in 2010, and after spending some time as a freelancer joined Tokyo Actor's Consumer's Cooperative Society in 2015. In May 2019, she was cast as Megumi Sasahara in Fire in His Fingertips.

Harashima voices Iku Nakatani in The Idolmaster Million Live!, a spin-off of The Idolmaster franchise. As part of the franchise, she performed as part of the quartet TIntMe! in the 2021 single "The Idolmaster Million Theater Wave 13: TIntMe!" (which charted at #9 in the Oricon Singles Chart). She reprised the role in Million Live's 2023 anime adaptation.

Harashima was the vocalist of a musical group called "ChocoNekoB" (styled chocoNekoβ). In March 2018, the group's agency TA-Link's announced that the group's activities had been indefinitely suspended.

Harashima is a certified food sanitation manager. One of her hobbies is collecting Kutusita Nyanko merchandise.

== Filmography ==
=== Animated television ===
2011

- Croisée in a Foreign Labyrinth, maid
- Tantei Opera Milky Holmes, host

2012

- Btooom!
- Nyaruko: Crawling with Love
- Saint Seiya Omega
- Say I Love You, Jun

2013

- Fantasista Doll, Ponpon
- Hakkenden: Eight Dogs of the East, Kinko
- Jewelpet Happiness, Rin
- Karneval, Nurse
- Kiniro Mosaic
- Kyousougiga, Pakupaku
- Little Busters!
- Senki Zesshō Symphogear G, Komichi Ayano
- Tamako Market, Kaede

2014

- Nagi-Asu: A Lull in the Sea

2019

- Fire in His Fingertips, Megumi Sasahara

2023

- The Idolmaster Million Live!, Iku Nakatani

=== Original video animation ===
2010

- Yuri Seijin Naoko-san, Misuzu

2014

- Futari Ecchi, Rui Tsutsumi

=== Video games ===
2011

- Dokidoki Suikoden, Nana Hachiōji

2012

- Tales of Xillia 2, Elle Mel Marta (as motion capture)
- Unchain Blaze XIV, Wepal

2013

- The Idolmaster Million Live!, Iku Nakatani

2015

- Tales of Zestiria, Edna (as motion capture)

2016

- BraveSword x BlazeSoul, Flametongue
- Tales of Berseria, Laphicet (as motion capture)
