= Lies & Kisses =

2005 yaoi manga

うそとキス
- Genre: Romance, Yaoi
- Manga
- Written by: Masara Minase
- Published by: Okura Publications
- English publisher: NA: DramaQueen
- Published: December 2005

Lies & Kisses is a one-shot yaoi manga by Masara Minase. It has been published in English by the American company DramaQueen, and in German by Carlsen. Lies & Kisses is one of many manga now reaching commercial success that contains the theme of incest. It is a great example of how the taboos of incest and homosexuality are often represented together in yaoi manga. It has been argued by many that this disproves the theory that homosexuality is somehow more accepted and tolerated in Japan, as its depiction is seen as on a par with the depiction of something as controversial as incest.

== Plot ==
The story revolves around the chance meeting and developing relationship of two long lost brothers. Tatsuya Soga is a young and elite businessman who is searching for his estranged younger half-brother. Whilst visiting a bar high Tatsuya sees a young barman, Haru, playing piano. Tatsuya believes it to be love at first sight and after inviting Haru out for a drink, they end up spending the night in a hotel room together. Their relationship quickly develops, until Tatsuya is told a disturbing truth - that Haru is the long lost brother he had been searching for. In an effort to be a good brother he avoids Haru, but eventually tries to be protective by allowing Haru to move in with him. The following pages involve Tatsuya trying to spurn his younger brother's advances and Haru's sense of rejection at this. Further on by chance Tatsuya meets Haru with his stepbrother Kaname, who accidentally reveals the truth about the true nature of Haru and Tatsuya's relationship. Tatsuya is outraged by this, thinking that Haru has tried to carry on a sexual relationship with his own brother. Tatsuya throws Haru out of the apartment. Haru returns to live with his stepbrother and father and the truth is revealed to the reader about Haru's knowledge of his relationship to Tatsuya. Haru believes that he is not related to Tatsuya and that he is simply the boy who he grew up with in his early life. Tatsuya is given more information by his assistant about their apparent past and Tatsuya regrets his actions and reconciles with Haru. Haru once again moves into Tatsuya's apartment and their sexual relationship resumes. At the end of the manga it is revealed to Tatsuya that Haru is in fact his half-brother, related to him by blood, but Tatsuya decides to hide this information from Haru and continue their current relationship, despite knowing this would deprive Haru of the father he had always longed for.
