= The Perfect Prince Loves Me, His Rival?! =

Japanese manga series

- Cover of vol. 1 of the Japanese version

当て馬キャラのくせにして、スパダリ王子に超愛されています。 (Ateuma Kyara no Kuse ni Shite, Supa Dari Ouji ni Chō Aisareteimasu)
- Genre: Boys' love, isekai
- Manga
- Written by: Ao Yuki
- Published by: Suiseisha
- English publisher: Coolmic
- Imprint: Glanz BL Comics
- Magazine: ComicFesta
- Original run: August 1, 2022 – present
- Volumes: 5
- Anime television series

The Perfect Prince Loves Me, the Side Character?!
- Directed by: Akikonchi
- Written by: Eyo Kurosaki
- Music by: Hisayoshi Hirasawa; Studio Mausu
- Studio: Studio Hōkiboshi
- Licensed by: Coolmic
- Original network: AnimeFesta (premium version); Tokyo MX, BS11 (standard version)
- Original run: March 15, 2024 – May 26, 2024
- Episodes: 8
- icon

The Perfect Prince Loves Me, His Rival?! (Japanese: 当て馬キャラのくせにして、スパダリ王子に超愛されています。, Hepburn: Ateuma Kyara no Kuse ni Shite, Supa Dari Ōji ni Chō Aisareteimasu; lit. "I'm Just a Rival Character, but the Perfect, Caring Prince is Deeply in Love With Me", also titled The Perfect Prince Loves Me, the Side Character?! for the English release of the anime) is a Japanese manga series by Ao Yuki. It is serialized digitally on the website ComicFesta since August 1, 2022. An anime adaptation was broadcast from March 15, 2024, to May 26, 2024, with a premium version for online streaming and a standard version for television broadcast.

== Plot ==
A sales employee from a publisher is killed in a truck accident and is reincarnated as Loneal Gravis, a character from his favorite fantasy romance novel, The Silver Prince and the Holy Bride. Loneal is the cousin of the novel's protagonist, Lily Philips, and in the original story, he disappears in the middle of the first volume after being exiled by the prince and Lily's romantic interest, Alec Ray Garcium, for forcing himself on her. To avoid exile, Loneal tries his best to steer clear of Alec, but during the royal ball, he gets into a struggle with him over Lily. The events of the story change when Loneal accidentally splashes a love potion on Alec, which causes Alec to fall in love with him. Though Loneal is also in love with Alec, he continues to hide his feelings for him as he searches for the potion's antidote and restore the events of the original novel.

== Characters ==
Alec Ray Garcium (アレク・レイ・ガルシアム, Areku Rei Garushiamu)
Voiced by: Santa Hiiragi (Japanese); Darragh Ó Broin (English)
Alec is a prince. Ao Yuki describes him as someone who is cool but becomes sweet to the person he loves. He is skilled in both sword arts and magic. In the original events of The Silver Prince and the Holy Bride, Alec was Lily's love interest until Loneal alters the course of the story by accidentally splashing him with a love potion, causing him to fall in love with him.
Loneal Gravis (ロニール・グラヴィス, Ronīru Guravisu)
Voiced by: Haru Danji (Japanese); Jason Daryl-Hall (English)
The protagonist is originally a Japanese sales employee at a publishing company who is reincarnated into The Silver Prince and Holy Bride after a truck accident. He becomes determined to restore the events of the original novel after accidentally splashing Alec with a love potion. In the original events of The Silver Prince and the Holy Bride, Loneal was a minor character who was in love with Lily and the driving force behind Alec realizing his feelings for her. When Loneal tried to force himself on her while she was drunk during the royal ball, Alec caught him in the act and had him exiled. Loneal disappeared partway into volume 1 after his exile.
Lily Philips (リリィ・フィリップス, Rirī Firippusu)
Voiced by: Mei Hanamori (Japanese); Allanah Fitzgerald (English)
Lily is the main female character in The Silver Prince and the Holy Bride. She is Loneal's cousin and Alec's original love interest.
Zeno Orwen (ゼノ・オーウェン, Zeno Ōuen)
Voiced by: Shū Kasumi (Japanese); Robyn McConnell (English)
Zeno is Loneal's friend and the son of a count.
Noah Carlisle (ノア・カーライル, Noa Kārairu)
Voiced by: Shō Shioko (Japanese); Chris Harris-Beechey (English)
Noah is the head of the disciplinary committee who had made a promise with Loneal prior to his reincarnation.

== Media ==
=== Manga ===
The Perfect Prince Loves Me, His Rival?! is written and illustrated by Ao Yuki. It is serialized on the website ComicFesta under the Screamo label since August 1, 2022. The chapters were later released in five bound volumes by Suiseisha under the Glanz BL Comics imprint. The manga is distributed in English by Coolmic.

The Perfect Prince Loves Me, His Rival?! is Yuki's first multi-volume series. In 2024, Yuki stated that, in volume 2, she brought in concepts relating to leveling up in role-playing video games to show how Loneal was learning magic.

| No. | Japanese release date | Japanese ISBN |
|---|---|---|
| 1 | July 18, 2023 | 978-4-434-31958-7 |
| 2 | March 18, 2024 | 978-4-434-33182-4 (regular edition); 978-4-434-33305-7 (limited edition with booklet) |
| 3 | January 17, 2025 | 978-4-434-34744-3 |
| 4 | October 17, 2025 | 978-4-434-36182-1 |
| 5 | May 18, 2026 | 978-4-434-37411-1 |

=== Anime ===
In June 2023, ComicFesta announced they were producing an anime adaptation of The Perfect Prince Loves Me, His Rival?!, releasing under the international title The Perfect Prince Loves Me, the Side Character?! The anime adaptation is animated by Studio Hōkiboshi. Two versions of the anime were produced: a standard version for television broadcast and a premium version including sexual content for streaming on AnimeFesta's website under the Toridori label. The premium version was released on AnimeFesta's website from March 15, 2024, to May 26, 2024. The standard version was broadcast from April 8, 2024, (Note: Tokyo MX lists the premiere date as April 7, 2024, at 24:00, which is April 8, 2024, at 12:00 a.m.) to June 10, 2024, on Tokyo MX. Additional broadcasts include BS 11.

The anime adaptation is directed by Akikonchi and written by Eyo Kurosaki. Reina Nasu is in charge of character design. Maki Hashimoto is in charge of animation direction. The theme song is "Colorful Fairytale" by Santa Hiiragi and Haru Danji as their characters.

On July 26, 2025, an English dub was released on OceanVeil.

==== Episodes ====
| No. | Title (Note: All English titles are taken from Coolmic.) | Directed by | Written by | Original release date |
|---|---|---|---|---|
| 1 | "You're the One... I've Always Longed For"; Transliteration: "Zutto Kimi ni Sawaretakatta" (Japanese: ずっと君に触れたかった) | satsuki | Eeyo Kurosaki | March 15, 2024 (premium version); April 8, 2024 (standard version) |
| 2 | "Let's Recreate the Magic From Yesterday"; Transliteration: "Kinō no Tsuzuki o Shite Kimi o Aishitai" (Japanese: 昨日の続きをして君を愛したい) | Sumito Sasaki | Eeyo Kurosaki | April 14, 2024 (premium version); April 15, 2024 (standard version) |
| 3 | "No Matter What Secrets You May Hold"; Transliteration: "Kimi ga, Donna Himitsu o Daeteite mo..." (Japanese: 君が、どんな秘密を抱えていても…) | Umeko Tsujimura | Eeyo Kurosaki | April 21, 2024 (premium version); April 22, 2024 (standard version) |
| 4 | "Is This Love an Illusion?"; Transliteration: "Aisareteiru Sakkaku Shisō ni Naru" (Japanese: 愛されていると錯覚しそうになる――) | Daiki Nishimura | Eeyo Kurosaki | April 28, 2024 (premium version); May 6, 2024 (standard version) |
| 5 | "I Want to Love You, From Morning Till Night, Forever."; Transliteration: "Ai o Sosogitai, Asa kara Yoru Made Zutto" (Japanese: 愛を注ぎたい、朝から晩までずっと) | Sumito Sasaki | Eeyo Kurosaki | May 5, 2024 (premium version); May 13, 2024 (standard version) |
| 6 | "Thank You For Teaching Me to Love"; Transliteration: "Koigokoro o Oshiete Kurete Arigatō" (Japanese: 恋心を教えてくれてありがとう) | Sumito Sasaki | Aki Konchi | May 12, 2024 (premium version); May 20, 2024 |
| 7 | "From the Depths of Our Beings"; Transliteration: "Karada no Shin Made Aishi Tsukusō" (Japanese: 体の芯まで愛し尽くそう) | Toshiaki Kanbara | Eeyo Kurosaki | May 19, 2024 (premium version); June 3, 2024 (standard version) |
| 8 | "I Adore You, Loneal"; Transliteration: "Aishiteiru, Ronīru" (Japanese: 愛している、ロニール) | Toshiaki Kanbara | Eeyo Kurosaki | May 26, 2024 (premium version); June 10, 2024 (standard version) |
