= Ka Shin Fu =

Japanese manga

花信風
- Genre: Romance, Yaoi
- Manga
- Written by: Makoto Tateno
- Published by: Ookura Shuppan
- English publisher: NA: Digital Manga Publishing
- Published: 12 July 2006

Ka Shin Fu (花信風, Kashinfū; transl. "Spring Wind Signaling the Blooming of Flowers") is a Japanese manga written and illustrated by Makoto Tateno. The manga is licensed in English by Digital Manga Publishing, which released it in October 2007, and in Germany by Egmont Manga in July 2010.

== Reception ==
Katharine Farmar, writing for Comics Village, felt the unusual part about the story was the complex family relations and the lack of focus on the modern-day couple's relationship. Holly Ellingwood, writing for Active Anime, compared the plot to classic soap operas such as Dynasty, as did Leroy Douresseaux of Comic Book Bin, who recommended it to anyone who liked "tawdry drama with their yaoi". Danielle Van Gorder, writing for Mania Entertainment, felt that the plot seemed in part contrived and that the shifting focus of the book left her confused.
