= Ryo Ryusei =

Japanese actor (born 1993)

- 竜星 涼
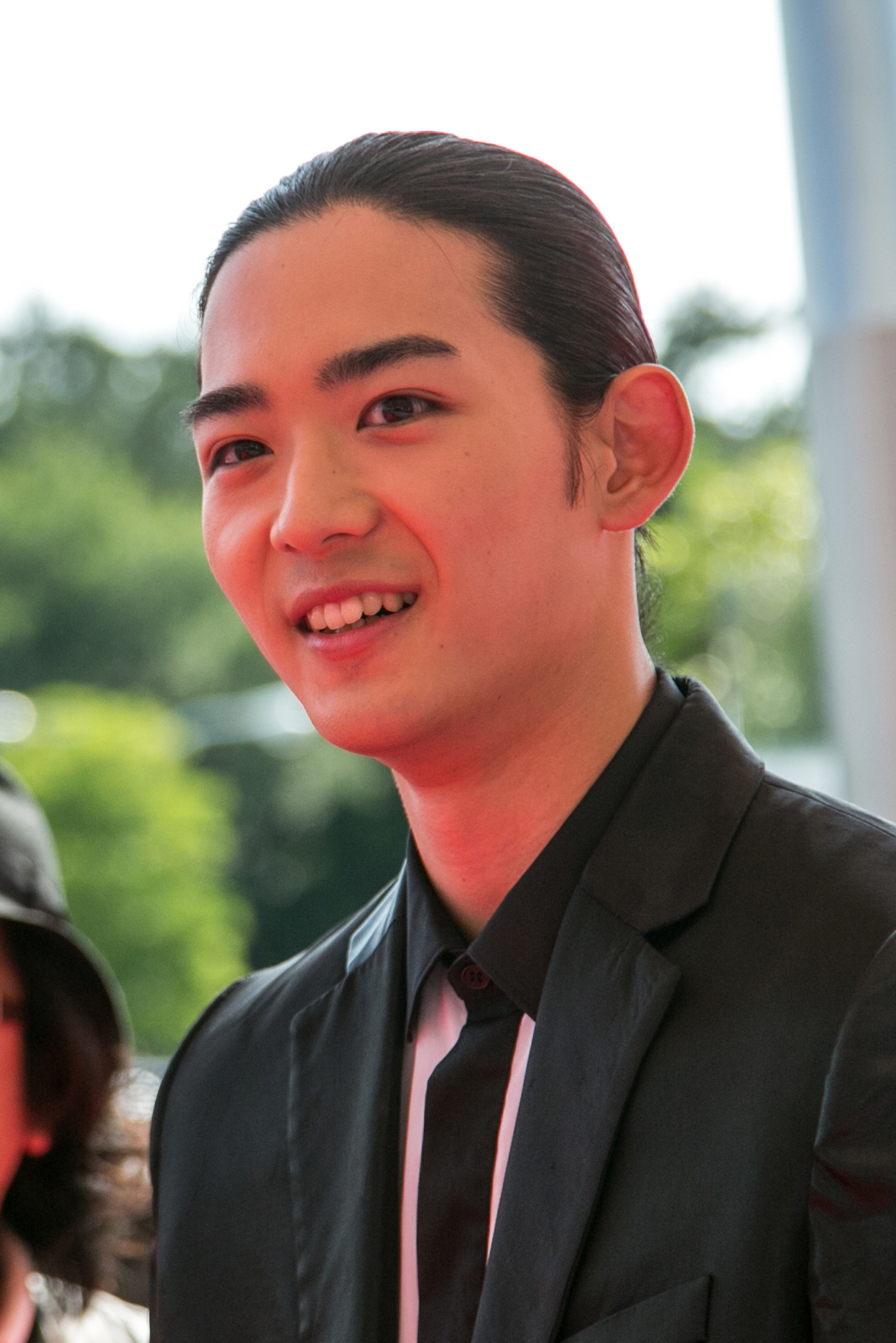
- Ryusei in 2014
- Born: March 24, 1993 (age 33); Shinjo, Yamagata, Japan
- Occupation: Actor
- Years active: 2010–present
- Website: Office Nino Official page

Ryo Ryusei (竜星 涼, Ryūsei Ryō; born March 24, 1993) is a Japanese actor. He was signed with Ken-On until August 31, 2026. As of October 1, he is affiliated to Office Nino.

== Career ==
Ryusei was scouted on his way to a hair salon on Takeshita Street in Harajuku in the summer of 2009, and officially joined Ken-On in January 2010. He is a fan of the TV drama Beach Boys, and the reason he gave for signing with Ken-On was because Takashi Sorimachi and Yutaka Takenouchi, who starred in the work, were signed with the company, and he had a feeling that he might be able to meet them.

In April 2010 he made his acting debut as a student of Tsukiko Mizuno who played the character Juri Ueno in 素直になれなくて (I Can't Be Obedient) which was broadcast on Fuji TV. Toshiyuki Nakano, the producer of the drama, praised his adaptability as an actor and his speed in getting used to the atmosphere. Ryusei evaluated how he was getting better, saying, "I think it's probably because I have good intuition as an actor.

In February 2012, he starred in Studio Life's performance of "OZ" making his stage debut. In March 2012, he made his film debut in ライアーゲーム -再生- (Liar Game -Rebirth-).

He made his TV drama debut as Daigo Kiryu/Kyoryu Red in the 37th Super Sentai series Zyuden Sentai Kyoryuger which was broadcast from February 2013 to February 2014. Though uncredited, he also played the role of Takeshi Iwaizumi in the same work. He made his movie debut in "Theatrical Version Zyuden Sentai Kyoryuger Gabrincho of Music". In Kyoryuger, Ryusei said that he enjoyed being able to have various experiences even in the dangerous action scenes and was happy when the director told him to shoot without using stunt doubles. He cites the scene where he was lying in the water in winter as the only difficult shooting.

He appeared at MTV VMAJ 2014 on June 14, 2014, as a guest celebrity presenter at the awards ceremony. He also participated for the first time in the stage "MEN ON STYLE" featuring Ken-On's rookie actors.

In January 2016, he appeared in "Yohji Yamamoto HOMME 2016-2017AW Paris Collection", making his debut at the Paris Collection. In 2017, he made his second appearance at the Paris Collection with the "Y-3 Fall/Winter 2017–2018 Collection".

In 2017, he appeared in the serial TV novel Hiyokko, receiving attention for his appearance as "Small Giant". Since then, he has appeared in Unnatural, Showa Genroku Rakugo Shinju, and Maison de Police. In 2018, he starred in the drama Konda Teru's Legal Recipe. In 2019, he starred in the TV drama Metropolitan Suisho! ~Reiwa~. In the Japanese dub of Toy Story 4, released in July 2014, he dubbed Forky, a handmade toy made from a broken spoon.

According to a report by Josei Seven, Ryusei departed his agency on August 31, 2026, after 16 years of belonging there. He is in talks with Kazunari Ninomiya in order to be joining or forming a business partnership with "Office Nino", Ninomiya's personal agency. As of September 28, Ryusei has a link on his official Instagram account for business contacts. On October 1, 2026, Ninomiya welcomed Ryusei into Office Nino.

== Personal life ==
His parents are from Yamagata Prefecture, and he was born in Shinjo City, Yamagata Prefecture. He is 185 cm tall, and his blood type is A. His hobbies include soccer and basketball, and his specialty is the high jump. He played soccer from elementary school to his third year of junior high school. Additionally, Mana Iwabuchi was his teammate at the time.

Before being scouted, Ryusei wanted to be a pastry chef and train in France. When he appeared at Paris Fashion Week in 2016, he said he was happy to be in France, albeit in a different way, which was his dream.

== Filmography ==
=== TV series ===
Year	Title	Role	Other notes	Ref.
2013	Zyuden Sentai Kyoryuger	Daigo Kiryu, Kyoryu Red (voice)	Lead role	
2017	Hiyokko	Masayoshi Watabiki	Asadora	
2018	Unnatural	Nagumo Kibayashi		
2022	Chimudondon	Kenshū Higa	Asadora	
2023	Stand Up Start	Taiyō Mihoshi	Lead role	
2023–26	Vivant	Kōtarō Shinjō	2 seasons	
2024	Dear Radiance	Fujiwara no Takaie	Taiga drama	
2024	Acma: Game	Senya Uesugi		

=== Film ===
Year	Title	Role	Other notes	Ref.
2012	Liar Game: Reborn	Osamu Shimoharada		
2012	Ouran High School Host Club Movie	Umehito Nekozawa		
2012	The Castle of Crossed Destinies ~ Eien ~ Emonnosuke – Tsunayoshi	Shinsuke		
2013	Tokumei Sentai Go-Busters vs. Kaizoku Sentai Gokaiger: The Movie	Daigo Kiryu/Kyoryu Red (voice)		
2013	Kamen Rider × Super Sentai × Space Sheriff: Super Hero Taisen Z	Daigo Kiryu/Kyoryu Red (voice)		
2013	Zyuden Sentai Kyoryuger: Gaburincho of Music	Daigo Kiryu/Kyoryu Red (voice)		
2014	Zyuden Sentai Kyoryuger vs. Go-Busters: The Great Dinosaur Battle! Farewell Our Eternal Friends	Daigo Kiryu/Kyoryu Red (voice)		
2014	Heisei Riders vs. Shōwa Riders: Kamen Rider Taisen feat. Super Sentai	Daigo Kiryu/Kyoryu Red (voice)		
2015	Ressha Sentai ToQger vs. Kyoryuger: The Movie	Daigo Kiryu/Kyoryu Red (voice)		
2015	Orange	Hiroto Suwa		
2016	Shimauma	Dora		
2016	Nakimushi Pierrot no Kekkonshiki	Yosuke Akiyama		
2017	The 100th Love with You	Naoya Matsuda		
2017	My Teacher	Kōsuke Kawai		
2019	Nakuna Akaoni			
2020	Yowamushi Pedal	Shingo Kinjō		
2020	Restart After Coming Back Home	Yamato Kumai	Lead role	
2020	Grand Blue	Iori Kitahara		
2023	G-Men	Takumi Sena		
2024	Last Mile	Nagumo Kibayashi		
2025	Showtime 7	Seiya Asaka		
2025	Kowloon Generic Romance	Miyuki Hebinuma		
2026	Never Guilty	Yukinori Higashi		
2026	Vivant: The Movie	Kōtarō Shinjō		

=== Japanese dub ===
Year	Title	Role	Other notes	Ref.
2019	Toy Story 4	Forky		
