= Blue Sheep Reverie =

Japanese manga series

- Cover of Blue Sheep Reverie volume 1, as published by Nihonbungeisha

青い羊の夢 (Aoi Hitsuji no Yume)
- Genre: Yaoi, Action
- Manga
- Written by: Makoto Tateno
- Published by: Nihon Bungeisha
- English publisher: NA: Digital Manga Publishing
- Original run: August 28, 2006 – November 18, 2015
- Volumes: 9

Blue Sheep Reverie (Japanese: 青い羊の夢, Hepburn: Aoi Hitsuji no Yume) is a Japanese manga series written and illustrated by Makoto Tateno. The individual chapters were collected into nine tankōbon volumes which were released between August 28, 2006, and November 18, 2015. The manga is licensed in North America by Digital Manga Publishing under its Juné imprint, which released the first tankōbon volume on December 16, 2008, and the sixth on July 30, 2014. The manga is licensed in Germany as Blue Sheep Dream by Egmont Manga & Anime.

== Reception ==
Briana Lawrence comments on Lahti and Maria's "borderline incest" relationship. She also commends the protagonist for not running "into [Maria]'s arms once he found out that she was alive, even if she is an evil little so and so." Rachel Bentham commends the manga's swiftness, saying, "Only being two volumes in length, the series moves through shocks and revelations quickly, but not too quickly. It gives time for the emotional impact to take root in the character and affect the reader". Leroy Douresseaux comments on the manga's art, saying, "The figure drawing is sometimes amateurish, even poor – especially compared to Tateno's other work. On the other hand, the composition and design of panel content is quite imaginative. In fact, it's the emphasis on design and style in the art that keeps this story interesting. In her dystopian sci-fi manga (like Steal Moon), Tateno's visual ingenuity enlivens what might be an otherwise poor concept, which is promising for the rest of Blue Sheep Reverie."
