= Happy Boys =

Japanese television series

ハッピィ★ボーイズ (Happii Bōizu)
- Genre: Comedy, Drama
- Television drama
- Directed by: Tazawa Naoki, Yagi Kazusuke
- Produced by: Moriya Takeshi
- Original network: TV Tokyo
- Original run: April 2, 2007 – June 18, 2007
- Episodes: 13
- Manga
- Written by: Makoto Tateno
- Published by: Shinshokan
- English publisher: Digital Manga
- Magazine: Wings
- Original run: June 2007 – March 2008
- Volumes: 2

Happy Boys (ハッピィ★ボーイズ, Happii Bōizu) is a 13 episode Japanese television comedy, following five young men who work at Lady Braganza, a butler café. It was adapted into a manga by Makoto Tateno.

== Television series ==
The series aired Mondays between 13:15 and 14:45.

=== Cast ===
- Koji Seto as Segawa Kyoichi/Shiva
- Kenta Kamakari as Akasaka Junta/Renjou
- Keisuke Kato as Kitamura Kosuke/Ivory
- Gaku Shindo as Inada Gen/Silk
- Shugo Nagashima as Tsuruoka Kokoro/Ibu
- Eiji Sugawara as Fukawa Kiichi
- Shunji Fujimura as Shikawaichi Kura (Owner)
- Tetsushi Tanaka as Katano Sakatoru/Katapi

Guest stars

- Megumi Komatsu (ep1-2)
- Natsuhi Ueno (ep3-4)
- Hisae Morishita (ep5-6)
- Takahiro Uemura (ep5-6)
- Kaori Ikeda (ep7-8)
- Atsushi Hashimoto (ep7-8)
- Rie Minemura (ep9-10)
- Toshiyuki Toyonaga (ep9-10)
- Hana Kino (ep11-13)

== Summary ==
''Happy Boys'' is a television series that features nine male celebrities from various sectors of the entertainment industry, including television hosts, comedians, and musicians. The show's central concept is focused on "happiness training." At the onset of the series, each participant undergoes a test to determine their current level of happiness. Following this, they engage in a series of challenges and missions, designed to enhance their happiness and overall wellbeing.

The range of challenges varies, encompassing activities from basic ones like exercising and ensuring adequate sleep, to more complex tasks such as facing personal fears or performing in front of large audiences. The series adopts a documentary-style format, providing a perspective on the participants' personal lives and challenges through interviews and behind-the-scenes footage.

An integral aspect of ''Happy Boys'' is its all-male cast. This choice is made to confront the stereotype that men are generally less in tune with their emotions compared to women. The show aims to encourage emotional wellbeing among men by demonstrating male celebrities actively working on their emotional health.

Music is a significant component of the show. Each episode includes performances by the cast members, all of whom have musical backgrounds. The inclusion of music serves both as a form of entertainment and as a means for the cast to explore and express their emotions.

== Manga ==
The manga is licensed in English by Digital Manga Publishing, under their DokiDoki imprint. It is also licensed in Germany by Egmont Manga.

== Development ==
Makoto Tateno visited the cast and talked with them when she was developing the manga.

== Reception ==
Snow Wildsmith described the manga as "enjoyable, but not all that memorable", but noted that the stereotypically "blatantly gay" chef could offend some readers. Leroy Douresseaux felt the manga series had potential, but that the first volume was not "anything really special". Connie C. described the manga as being "a cross between Antique Bakery and Princess Princess". Matthew Warner felt it was fun to see the characters switch on their "butler-mode".
