= Angelic Runes =

Japanese manga by Makoto Tateno

- First volume of Angelic Runes, written and illustrated by Makoto Tateno, as published in English by Digital Manga Publishing.

エンジェリック・ルーン
- Genre: Drama, Fantasy
- Manga
- Written by: Makoto Tateno
- Published by: Shodensha
- English publisher: NA: Digital Manga Publishing
- Original run: April 20, 2007 – May 25, 2009
- Volumes: 3

Angelic Runes (エンジェリック・ルーン, Enjerikku Rūn), is a Japanese manga written and illustrated by Makoto Tateno. The individual chapters were collected into three bound volumes, which were published by Shodensha between April 20, 2007, and May 25, 2009. It was licensed in English by Digital Manga Publishing, which has released the first two volumes on July 22, 2009, and June 1, 2011, respectively. The manga is also licensed in Taiwan by Taiwan Tohan.

== Reception ==
School Library Journal's Snow Wildsmith comments on fantasy elements of the manga with "fantasy readers will enjoy spotting the many monsters, demons, and angels that Tateno references. [Tateno]'s obviously done her research." Graphic Novel Reporter's Casey Brienza commends Takeno, due to her being a "lukewarm fan of the fantasy genre", for drawing "heavily from mythological and religious tradition—hence all of the angels and demons speaking through Erudite and Allueh." PopCultureShock's Connie C. criticizes the "episodic nature" of the manga and the "monster-of-the-week-type situation". Comic Book Resources' Danielle Leigh commends Takeno for building "a very interesting human dimension to the journey", with "Sowil is searching for his father, but in a way he is also on a journey of self-discovery to learn more about the origin of his powers and the reason behind his very existence." Comic Book Bin's Leroy Douresseaux commends the manga with "while the stories are uncomplicated and straightforward, they are enjoyable and charming in their simplicity." Comics Village's Lori Henderson commends the manga's art with "the art is beautifully drawn, especially Sowil. Tateno's delicate lines make for some really good looking characters. And unlike other artists, the characters are still different and distinct beyond hair and clothes."
