= Caressing My Hibernating Bear =

Japanese manga series

- Cover of vol. 1 of the Japanese version

森のくまさん、冬眠中。 (Mori no Kuma-san, Tōminchū)
- Genre: Boys' love, iyashikei, romance
- Manga

Caressing the Nipples of My Hibernating Bear
- Written by: Haruchika
- Published by: Suiseisha
- English publisher: Coolmic
- Imprint: Glanz BL Comics
- Magazine: ComicFesta
- Original run: June 8, 2020 – present
- Volumes: 7
- Anime television series
- Directed by: Kazuomi Koga
- Produced by: Akiko Segawa
- Written by: Shinobi Katō
- Music by: Satoko Endō; Black Flag
- Studio: Studio Hōkiboshi
- Licensed by: Ascendent Animation
- Original network: AnimeFesta (premium version); Tokyo MX, BS11 (standard version)
- Original run: July 4, 2022 – September 12, 2022
- Episodes: 9
- icon

Caressing My Hibernating Bear (Note: Japanese: 森のくまさん、冬眠中。, Hepburn: Mori no Kuma-san, Tōminchū; lit. 'The Bear in the Forest is Hibernating'), titled Caressing the Nipples of My Hibernating Bear (Note: 森のくまさん、冬眠中に乳首を愛でられました｡, Mori no Kuma-san, Tōminchū ni Chikubi o Mederaremashita; lit. 'While the Bear in the Forest is Hibernating, His Nipples were Cherished') during serialization, is a Japanese manga series by Haruchika. It is serialized digitally on the website ComicFesta since June 8, 2020. An anime adaptation was broadcast from July 4, 2022, to September 12, 2022, with a premium version for online streaming and a standard version for television broadcast.

== Plot ==
Nowa, a bear living in a rural forest town, takes in Airi, a puppy, and raises him on his own. Nowa and Airi grow to have a close relationship, but when time comes for Nowa to hibernate, he promises to meet with Airi once he wakes up. After Nowa wakes up, Airi has grown up into an adult. Airi professes his love for Nowa, and while Nowa faces confusion over the change in Airi and their relationship, he comes to return his feelings as well.

== Characters ==
Airi (アイリ)
Voiced by: Kōhei Amasaki (audio drama & standard version), Mei Mei (premium version) (Japanese); Michael Kovach (English)
Airi is an Irish Wolfhound who was orphaned as a puppy after his parents' death. He was taken in by Nowa and grows to love him romantically. Haruchika describes him as "lively" and "straightforward."
Nowa (ノワ)
Voiced by: Kazuyuki Okitsu (audio drama & standard version), Kazuo Yoruno (premium version) (Japanese); Zack Maher (English)
Nowa is an Asian black bear. Haruchika describes him as a "gentle and plump older bear" who eats a lot and is timid, but he is also a kind person who "warmly embraces" Airi. Haruchika stated that they tried to make Nowa's chest look "soft and fluffy." They also stated that Asian black bears naturally have long tongues and had wanted to draw Nowa as such, but they decided not to at the moment due to how they felt the audience would perceive it.
Kou (コウ)
Voiced by: Kengo Kawanishi (audio drama & standard version), Tomoya Tsuyu (premium version) (Japanese); Jerron Bacat (English)
Kou is a civet cat. He is viewed as a reliable older brother figure in his town, but he has a difficult time with being honest to his own feelings. Haruchika described Kou as the shortest of the main characters and pivotal in helping Airi and Nowa's relationship progress.
Watari (ワタリ)
Voiced by: Seiichiro Yamashita (standard version), Umatarō Tanshio (premium version) (Japanese); Diontae Black (English)
Watari is a raven who is quiet and works at his own pace. He has a bad sense of direction and tends to get lost. He is in love with Kou and supports him in his own way. Haruchika describes him as a "crossdressing seme."

== Media ==
=== Manga ===
Caressing My Hibernating Bear is written and illustrated by Haruchika. It is serialized on the website ComicFesta under the Screamo label since June 8, 2020, under the title Caressing the Nipples of My Hibernating Bear. The chapters were later released in seven bound volumes by Suiseisha under the Glanz BL Comics imprint. The manga is distributed in English by Manga Planet and Coolmic under its serialized title.

In 2021, Haruchika stated through an interview with Chil Chil that they had wanted to draw a fantasy story with non-human characters and came up with the story's concept after discussing with their editor. They stated they tried to make it like a "fairytale" with the setting taking place in a rural town where animals live. Because the characters are animals, Haruchika stated that they were "honest" about their instincts and tried to portray their emotions through their tails and ears in erotic scenes. For volume 2, where the characters move from the forest to the city, Haruchika stated that they tried to include a variety of backgrounds despite "not being good at drawing backgrounds." One memory they had about working on volume 2 was that a real bear had appeared in their neighborhood. In 2022, for the third volume, Haruchika stated that they included a scene where the characters go fishing for salmon and was told by their editor that this was the first time they had seen salmon fishing in a boys' love story. In addition, Haruchika stated they had always wanted to draw a story focusing on Kou and Watari's relationship and was "happy" to get a chance in volume 3, though they had to cut out some parts due to page limitations.

No.	Japanese release date	Japanese ISBN
1	July 18, 2021	9784434288258 (regular edition); ISBN 9784434288265 (limited edition with drama CD)
2	December 18, 2021	9784434294419
3	July 15, 2022	9784434302688
4	February 18, 2023	9784434312021 (regular edition); ISBN 9784434312038 (limited edition with booklet)
5	November 17, 2023	9784434325328 (regular edition); ISBN 9784434325335 (limited edition with booklet)
6	July 18, 2024	9784434338014
7	February 18, 2025	9784434349201

=== Audio drama ===
An audio drama was released on CD and bundled exclusively with the limited edition of the first manga volume. The voice cast includes Kōhei Amasaki as Airi, Kazuyuki Okitsu as Nowa, and Kengo Kawanishi as Kou.

=== Anime ===
On July 18, 2021, the release date for the first manga volume, ComicFesta announced they were producing an anime adaptation, which they were releasing under the international title Caressing My Hibernating Bear. The anime adaptation is animated by Studio Hōkiboshi. Two versions of the anime were produced: a standard version for television broadcast and a premium version including sexual content for streaming on AnimeFesta's website under the Toridori label. Prior to the series' broadcast, a special titled New Program: MoriKuma Special Feature: First Footage After Waking Up From Hibernation?! Special Release (新番組『森くま』特番～冬眠明けから初出し映像!?解禁SP～) was broadcast on Tokyo MX and BS11 on June 27, 2022. (Note: Tokyo MX lists the premiere date as June 26, 2022, at 25:00, which is June 27, 2022, at 1:00 a.m.)

The standard version was broadcast from July 4, 2022 (Note: Tokyo MX lists the premiere date as July 3, 2022, at 25:00, which is July 4, 2022, at 1:00 a.m.) to September 12, 2022, on Tokyo MX. Additional broadcasts include BS 11. The premium version was released on AnimeFesta's website on the same dates at midnight. Two side stories for the standard version were broadcast on television as episodes 3.5 and 6.5; those episodes were not uploaded to AnimeFesta and would be included as the extras for the home release of the standard version.

The cast from the audio drama adaptation, which had been bundled as an extra of the limited edition of the manga's first volume, reprised their roles for the standard version. Haruchika, the author of Caressing My Hibernating Bear, also contributed by providing voice acting. The anime adaptation is directed by Kazuomi Koga and written by Shinobi Katō. Kinshi Onisawa is in charge of character design. Asuka Hayashi and Izumi Yamanaka is in charge of animation direction. Satoko Endō is in charge of music direction, with Black Flag producing the soundtrack. The theme song is "Tsunaida Te to Nukumori to" by Amasaki and Okitsu as their characters.

On February 1, 2023, Ascendent Animation had licensed the anime adaptation. They also announced that they were producing an English-language dub. The English dub was released on Blu-ray and for streaming on Amazon Prime Video on October 6, 2023.

==== Episodes ====
No.	Title (Note: All English titles are taken from Coolmic.)	Directed by	Written by	Original release date
1	"When the Cute Bear Needs to Hibernate..."; Transliteration: "Kuma-san no Fuyugomori" (Japanese: クマさんの冬ごもり)	Kazuomi Koga	Kato Shinobi	July 4, 2022
2	"Leaving the Nest"; Transliteration: "Oyabanare ni Toki" (Japanese: 親離れの時)	Toshihiro Watase	Kato Shinobi	July 11, 2022
3	"Forgotten Urges"; Transliteration: "Sūnenburi no Hatsujōki" (Japanese: 数年ぶりの発情期)	Toshihiro Watase	Kato Shinobi	July 18, 2022
3.5	Transliteration: "Bangai-hen: Mori no Kuma-san, Tōminchū. 1" (Japanese: 番外編『森のくまさん、休憩中。』①)	Unknown	Unknown	July 25, 2022 (television broadcast)
4	"A Doggy's Request"; Transliteration: "Wanko no Onegai" (Japanese: ワンコのお願い)	Toshihiro Watase	Kato Shinobi	August 1, 2022
5	"Operation: Nipple-Guard"; Transliteration: "Chikubi Hogo Keikaku" (Japanese: 乳首保護計画)	Motohiko Niwa	Kato Shinobi	August 8, 2022
6	"His First Job"; Transliteration: "Hajimete no Oshigoto" (Japanese: はじめてのお仕事)	Motohiko Niwa	Kato Shinobi	August 15, 2022
6.5	Transliteration: "Bangai-hen: Mori no Kuma-san, Tōminchū. 2" (Japanese: 番外編『森のくまさん、休憩中。』②)	Unknown	Unknown	August 22, 2022 (television broadcast)
7	"First Date Jitters"; Transliteration: "Dēto no Osasoi" (Japanese: デートのお誘い)	Toshiaki Kanbara	Kato Shinobi	August 25, 2022
8	"The Bear's Trauma"; Transliteration: "Kuma-san no Torauma" (Japanese: クマさんのトラウマ)	Toshiaki Kanbara	Kato Shinobi	September 5, 2022
9	"I Want us to be Boyfriends"; Transliteration: "Koibito ni Naritai" (Japanese: 恋人になりたい)	Kazuomi Koga	Kato Shinobi	September 12, 2022

== Reception ==
Caressing My Hibernating Bear was listed at no. 17 under the Best Erotic category in the 2022 Chil Chil BL Awards.
