= Fourth Generation Head: Tatsuyuki Oyamato =

Boys' love manga/comic book

- Cover of the first manga volume, featuring Tatsuyuki and Nozomi

四代目大和辰之 (Fourth Generation Head: Tatsuyuki Oyamato)
- Genre: Yaoi
- Manga
- Written by: Beriko Scarlet
- Published by: Shinshokan
- English publisher: NA: SuBLime
- Imprint: Dear+ Comics
- Original run: July 30, 2015 – present
- Volumes: 1
- Audio drama
- Directed by: Kou Hachiya
- Written by: Misa Sasa
- Music by: WaterBear/Ataco/Comecco
- Studio: THREE S STUDIO
- Episodes: 1

Fourth Generation Head: Tatsuyuki Oyamato (四代目・大和辰之) is boys' love manga/comic book written and illustrated by a Japanese manga artist Beriko Scarlet. It is Scarlet's third published comic, and also the sequel to Minori's Hand and prequel to Jealousy.

== Plot ==
Tatsuyuki Oyamato, a son of the Yakuza boss Akitora Oyamato and an heir to Oyamato Family in Tokyo, is reluctant to carry on his family legacy and responsibilities. He also starts questioning his sexuality after his "sessions" with Minori, a chiropractor with special "methods" to relax his clients. Being heartbroken by Minori's sudden disappearance, Tatsuyuki is sent to manage the family's small start-up branch in Fukuoka and to clean up his act. One night, he encounters with Nozomi, whom he had met when they were kids. While their relationship starts blossoming, reckless Tatsuyuki falls into the hands of Uichi Rogi, a mysterious man who has a past with Tatsuyuki's father.

== Characters ==
Tatsuyuki Oyamato (大和辰之, Oyamato Tatsuyuki)
A spoiled son of Akitora Oyamato, a big boss of Oyamato Family. Tatsuyuki was first introduced to the audience in Beriko's previous comic, Give Me a Hand. Tatsuyuki's journey begins when his love interest Minori disappears after being reunited with his long lost ex-boyfriend. Depressed and heartbroken, Tatsuyuki is sent to manage the Fukuoka branch, then meets Nozomi, whom he had met when they were kids.

Nozomi Koga (小鹿望, Koga Nozomi)
A tall handsome kindergarten teacher who has a past of being sexually abused by his father when he was a kid. He fell in love with Tatsuyuki when they first met, and was later revealed that he has been secretly stalking Tatsuyuki for years.

Uichi Rogi (櫓木卯一, Rogi Uichi)
A money lender in Fukuoka. He has a history with Tatsuyuki's dad, Akitora, and has been pursuing him to come to Fukuoka by any means possible. Uichi later becomes the leading role of Beriko's latest comic, Jealousy.

Asoda (浅生田, Asoda)
A right-hand man of Akitora Oyamato. Asoda raised Tatsuyuki like his own son after his biological mother passed when Tatsuyuki was only eight. He loves Tatsuyuki dearly but regrets he has spoiled him. He also becomes one of the main characters in Jealousy.

Reika Rogi (櫓木麗華, Rogi Reika)
Uichi Rogi's daughter who goes to the kindergarten Nozomi works for. She is a little kid with very mature demeanors. She also has a recurrent role in Jealousy.

== Media ==
=== Manga ===
Originally published in Japan in 2015, the book has been widely translated and published in many countries, including Taiwan, South Korea, the United States, Germany, France and Portugal.

Fourth Generation Head: Tatsuyuki Oyamato(四代目・大和辰之) Release Data
TITLE	COUNTRY	RELEASE DATE	ISBN	PUBLISHER
四代目・大和辰之	Japan	July 30, 2015	978-4-403-66480-9	新書館
Show Me Your Gun	Germany	July 30, 2015	978-3-7704-9260-2	Egmont Group
四代目・大和辰之	Taiwan	April 6, 2016	978-986-462-983-1	東立
Czwarty: Tatsuyuki Oyamato	Poland	June 6, 2017	978-836489143-4	Waneko
Fourth Generation Head: Tatsuyuki Oyamato	France	October 25, 2018	978-2-375-06112-1	Taifu
Fourth Generation Head: Tatsuyuki Oyamato	North America	August 13, 2019	978-1-974-70710-2	SubLime
Fourth Generation Head: Tatsuyuki Oyamato	South Korea	n/a	web only	Lezhin

In 2019, Tatsuyuki Oyamato Premium Collection (四代目・大和辰之 プレミアム・コレクション もつ鍋とリーゼント MTR) was published in Japan, then subsequently in Taiwan, South Korea, Portugal and France after the comic's success and demand from fans. The book includes new original comics, color illustrations, and an in-depth interview with the author.

The short comic, Sweet Flavor (アマイ・フレイバー), which was previously only available with the purchase of the Drama CD, is also included in 四代目・大和辰之 プレミアム・コレクション もつ鍋とリーゼント MTR.

Tatsuyuki Oyamato Premium Collection (四代目・大和辰之 プレミアム・コレクション もつ鍋とリーゼント MTR) Release Data
TITLE	COUNTRY	RELEASE DATE	ISBN	PUBLISHER
四代目・大和辰之 プレミアム・コレクション もつ鍋とリーゼント MTR	Japan	July 30, 2019	978-4-403-65086-4	新書館
CZWARTY TATSUYUKI OYAMATO PREMIUM COLLECTION	Portugal	March 29, 2020	978-4-403-65086-4	Waneko
四代目‧大和辰之精選集 牛雜鍋和飛機頭	Taiwan	January 30, 2020	978-957-26-4197-2	東立

=== Drama CD ===
Following the success of the comic book, the drama CD was released on March 18, 2016, in Japan. It included the original 16 page comic, Sweet Flavor (アマイ・フレイバー). The short drama CD with the same title was also sold with BL Magazine, Cheri+ Volume 21 in July 2016. These 2 items became the collector's items and traded on the auction sites with high prices.

The short comic, Sweet Flavor (アマイ・フレイバー), was later included in 四代目・大和辰之 プレミアム・コレクション もつ鍋とリーゼント MTR.

Fourth Generation Head: Tatsuyuki Oyamato(四代目・大和辰之) Drama CD Cast
CHARACTER	VOICE ACTOR
Tatsuyuki Oyamato	Takuya Satō (佐藤拓也)
Nozomi Koga	Kazuyuki Okitsu(興津 和幸)
Uichi Rogi	Tarusuke Shingaki (新垣樽助)
Asoda	Tomofumi Taki (滝知史)
Reika Rogi	Marika Takano (高野万里佳)
Young Tatsuyuki	Kana Omuro (大室佳奈)
Young Nozomi	Yuuki Kuwahara (桑原由気)

Fourth Generation Head: Tatsuyuki Oyamato(四代目・大和辰之) Drama CD Data and Staff Credit
Original Comic and Illustration	Scarlet Beriko
Original Release Date	March 18, 2016
Run Time	78 Min and 2 Sec
Distributor	新書館Dear+ SWCD-092 / 新書館ディアプラスコミックス
Screenplay	佐々美沙
Original Score	WaterBear / Ataco / comecco
Director	蜂谷幸
Sound Production	グランビー
Sound Effect	サウンドボックス
Engineer	武藤雅人(スリーエススタジオ)
Assistant Engineer	柴田隆司(スリーエススタジオ)
Studio	スリーエススタジオ
Mastering	東京CDセンター

== Reception, Awards and Rankings ==
Fourth Generation Head: Tatsuyuki Oyamato received positive reception from new and established fans of the genre. Upon its initial digital release, the manga achieved high sales rankings across various online outlets. Reviewers and readers frequently highlighted the narrative structure, character development, and illustration quality.

Fourth Generation Head: Tatsuyuki Oyamato was successful critically and commercially, and received many awards, including the prestige annual BL Award on the Japan's most famous Boys' love website ちるちる.

These BL Comics Are Too Hot! 2016 (このBLがやばい2016)
Ranked #5 Fourth Generation Head: Tatsuyuki Oyamato

Chiru Chiru BL AWARDS 2016 (ChiruChiru 第七回BLアワード ランキング)

The Best Comics: Ranked #6 Fourth Generation Head: Tatsuyuki Oyamato

The Best Bottom: Ranked #2 Tatsuyuki Oyamato

The Most Erotic Character: Ranked #5 Tatsuyuki Oyamato

The Best Top: Ranked #11 Nozomi Koga

30 Ultimate BL Comics 2018 (腐女子・不朽の名作30選 2018)
Ranked #10 Fourth Generation Head: Tatsuyuki Oyamato

30 Ultimate BL Comics 2019 (腐女子・不朽の名作2019 コミックス編)
Ranked #17 Fourth Generation Head: Tatsuyuki Oyamato

Renta! #1 Best Selling BL Comics of The First Half Year in 2015 (Renta!2015年上半期人気漫画作品)
Fourth Generation Head: Tatsuyuki Oyamato
