= I Want to Be Naughty =

Japanese manga series

- Cover of the Japanese version of vol. 1, first published on December 28, 2006

ワルイコトシタイ (Warui Koto Shitai)
- Genre: Boys' love
- Manga
- Written by: Mei Sakuraga
- Published by: Houbunsha
- English publisher: NA: Kitty Media
- Imprint: Hanaoto Comics
- Magazine: Hanaoto; Boys Kyapi! (Mujihi na series)
- Original run: 2006 – present
- Volumes: 14

The I Want to Be Naughty (Japanese: ワルイコトシタイ, Hepburn: Warui Koto Shitai) series is a Japanese manga series written and illustrated Mei Sakuraga. It is serialized in the monthly boys' love manga magazine Hanaoto and the quarterly magazine Boys Kyapi! since 2006.

== Plot ==
Towa Aikawa is a high school delinquent who opposes the student council. He develops a friendship with Mikado Shirahane, but unbeknownst to him, Mikado has two secrets: the first one being that he is the president of the student council, and the second one being that he is in love with Towa.

== Characters ==
=== Main characters ===
Towa Aikawa (相川 永遠, Aikawa Towa)
Voiced by: Takahiro Mizushima
Towa is a first-year high school delinquent who opposes the student council.
Mikado Shirahane (白羽 帝, Shirahane Mikado)
Voiced by: Hikaru Midorikawa
Mikado is a second-year high school student and the president of the student council.

=== Classmates ===
Ryuichi Shinonome (東雲 隆一, Shinonome Ryūichi)
Voiced by: Nobuyuki Hiyama
Shinonome is Towa's friend and a first-year high school student.
Yu Kashiwagi (柏木 優, Kashiwagi Yū)
Voiced by: Tsubasa Yonaga
Yu is Towa's friend and a first-year high school student.
Shuji Yukimura (幸村 修二, Yukimura Shūji)
Voiced by: Hirofumi Nojima
Yukimura is a second-year high school student and the vice president of the student council.
Nao Kosaka (香坂 直, Kōsaka Nao)
Voiced by: Yoshitsugu Matsuoka
Kosaka is a first-year high school student and a member of the disciplinary committee.
Shiro Akagi (紅城 司狼, Akagi Shirō)
Voiced by: Yūki Ono
Akagi is a third-year high school student and the head of the disciplinary committee.
Hayate Kosaka (香坂 疾風, Kōsaka Hayate)
Voiced by: Takuya Eguchi
Hayate is Kosaka's younger brother.

=== Family members ===
Nagahisa Aikawa (相川 永久, Aikawa Nagahisa)
Voiced by: Atsushi Kisaichi
Nagahisa is Towa's eldest brother, who is protective of him.
Kuon Aikawa (相川 久遠, Aikawa Kuon)
Voiced by: Makoto Yasumura
Kuon is Towa's second oldest brother, who is protective of him. He is a second-year college student.
Nanao Shirahane (白羽 七王, Shirahane Nanao)
Voiced by: Kōji Yusa
Nanao is Mikado's older brother. He is a third-year college student attending the same university as Kuon.

== Media ==
=== Manga ===
I Want to Be Naughty is written and illustrated by Mei Sakuraga. It was serialized in monthly manga magazine Hanaoto since 2006. The chapters were later released in 14 bound volumes by Houbunsha under the Hanaoto Comics imprint.

Throughout the series' run, several side stories focusing on side characters were also published. The Janai Kedo series focuses on Shinonome and Yukimura, Towa and Mikado's friends. The Mujihi na series focuses on Kuon and Nanao, Towa and Mikado's older brothers, and was serialized in the quarterly magazine Boys Kyapi! Beginning with Himitsu Janai Kedo: Yukimura Shūji ni Tsuite no Kansatsu, the series moved to Boys Kyapi!

In June 2007, Media Blasters licensed the first volume for North American distribution in English under their Kitty Media imprint.

No.	Title	Original release date	English release date
1	I Want to Be Naughty; Warui Koto Shitai (ワルイコトシタイ)	December 28, 2006; 9784832284371	October 16, 2007; 9781598831344
2	Warui Ko Demo Ii? (悪いコでもイイ？)	November 29, 2007; 9784832284913	—
3	Kirai Janai Kedo (嫌いじゃないけど)	July 29, 2008; 9784832285415	—
4	Warui Yatsu Demo Ii (ワルイ男でもイイ)	February 28, 2009; 9784832285880	—
5	Koi Janai Kedo (恋じゃないけど)	December 26, 2009; 9784832286559	—
6	Mujihi na Otoko (無慈悲なオトコ)	December 27, 2010; 9784832287273	—
7	Warui Koibito ja Dame? (ワルイ恋人じゃダメ？)	April 30, 2011; 9784832287495	—
8	Kare Janai Kedo (彼じゃないけど)	December 27, 2011; 9784832287853	—
9	Mujihi na Anata (無慈悲なアナタ)	September 29, 2012; 9784832288188	—
10	Sunao Janai Kedo (素直じゃないけど)	February 28, 2013; 9784832288386	—
11	Warui Ōji Demo Suki (ワルイ王子でもスキ)	December 27, 2013; 9784832288775	—
12	Mujihi na Karada (無慈悲なカラダ)	October 29, 2014; 9784832289116	—
13	Shōwaru Ōkami ga Koi o Shitarashii (性悪オオカミが恋をしたらしい)	June 29, 2015; 9784832289383	—
14	Himitsu Janai Kedo: Yukimura Shūji ni Tsuite no Kansatsu (ヒミツじゃないけど～幸村修二についての観察～)	May 28, 2016; 9784832289772	—

==== Side stories ====
The short comic Warui Koto Bakka Shite Gomen Nasai was originally released in 2008 as a limited edition booklet acquired through a lottery with purchase of Kirai Janai Kedo. It was later re-released and compiled with Sakuraga's other short comics on June 19, 2020, on digital platforms.

No.	Title	Japanese release date	Japanese ISBN
1	Warui Koto Bakka Shite Gomen Nasai. (悪いことばっかしてごめんなさい。)	June 19, 2020 (digital only)	—

=== Drama CDs ===
Several drama CDs produced by Movic were released during the series' run. I Want to Be Naughty was released on December 21, 2007. Kirai Janai Kedo was released on January 27, 2010, and peaked at #264 on the Oricon Weekly Albums Chart. Warui Ko Demo Ii? was released on July 22, 2010. Koi Janai Kedo was released on August 25, 2010. Mujihi na Otoko was released on May 25, 2011, and peaked at #207 on the Oricon Weekly Albums Chart. Warui Yatsu Demo Ii was released on March 2, 2012. Warui Koibito ja Dame? was released on March 21, 2012. Kare Janai Kedo was released on April 2, 2012, and peaked at #221 on the Oricon Weekly Albums Chart. Mujihi na Anata was released on June 28, 2013, and peaked at #96 on the Oricon Weekly Albums Chart. Sunao Janai Kedo was released on November 29, 2013, and peaked at #159 on the Oricon Weekly Albums Chart. Warui Ōji Demo Suki was released on October 30, 2015, and peaked at #113 on the Oricon Weekly Albums Chart. Mujihi na Karada was released on November 27, 2015, and peaked at #120 on the Oricon Weekly Albums Chart. Shōwaru Ōkami ga Koi o Shitarashii was released on December 25, 2015, and peaked at #94 on the Oricon Weekly Albums Chart. Himitsu Janai Kedo: Yukimura Shūji ni Tsuite no Kansatsu was released on November 25, 2016, and peaked at #152 on the Oricon Weekly Albums Chart.

== Reception ==
The I Want to Be Naughty series placed at #20 in the Top 20 Manga on Chil Chil's Boys Love Awards in 2014. Kare Janai Kedo peaked at #27 on Oricon and sold 31,321 physical copies on its first week of sales. Mujihi na Anata peaked at #43 on Oricon and sold 20,759 physical copies on its second week of sales, with a cumulative total of 37,488 physical copies. Sunao Janai Kedo peaked at #26 on Oricon and sold 31,415 physical copies on its first week of sales. Mujihi na Karada peaked at #21 on Oricon and sold 34,527 physical copies on its first week of sales. Shōwaru Ōkami ga Koi o Shitarashii peaked at #25 on Oricon and sold 32,966 physical copies on its first week of sales, with a cumulative total of 33,275 physical copies. Himitsu Janai Kedo: Yukimura Shūji ni Tsuite no Kansatsu peaked at #36 on Oricon and sold 22,183 physical copies on its second week of sales, with a cumulative total of 36,390 physical copies.
