= Golden Prince and Argent King =

Japanese manga

金の王子と銀の王 (Kin no Ōji to Gin no Ō)
- Genre: Yaoi
- Manga
- Written by: Kouko Agawa
- Published by: Libre Publishing
- English publisher: NA: Digital Manga Publishing
- Published: December 9, 2006

Golden Prince and Argent King (金の王子と銀の王, Kin no Ōji to Gin no Ō) is a Japanese manga written and illustrated by Kouko Agawa. It is licensed in North America by Digital Manga Publishing, which released the manga through its June imprint, on June 10, 2008.

== Reception ==
Danielle Van Gorder felt the plot was convoluted with "by-the-book plot twists", but that something about the characters made the book "more interesting" than Van Gorder otherwise felt it should have been. She felt the melodrama of the work pushed it into becoming "almost a strange absurdist comedy". Rachel Bentham, writing for Active Anime, praised the "distinct" character designs, saying that this reflected the characters' personalities, and noted that the plot was a "full-bodied love triangle". Leroy Douresseaux felt the artwork gave the manga a "Film Noir" feel, and praised the expressiveness which the art gave the characters.
