= Restart After Coming Back Home =

Japanese manga series by Cocomi

リスタートはただいまのあとで (Risutāto wa Tadaima no Ato de)
- Genre: Boys' love
- Manga
- Written by: Cocomi
- Published by: France Shoin
- English publisher: NA: Seven Seas Entertainment
- Imprint: Canna Comics
- Magazine: Canna
- Original run: December 22, 2016 – present
- Volumes: 1
- Live-action film
- Directed by: Ryuta Inoue
- Written by: Kumiko Sato
- Released: September 4, 2020
- Runtime: TBA

Restart After Coming Back Home (Japanese: リスタートはただいまのあとで, Hepburn: Risutāto wa Tadaima no Ato de) is a Japanese manga series written and illustrated by Cocomi. It was serialized in the semi-monthly boys' love manga magazine Canna from 2016 to 2018. The book was followed up with a one-volume sequel spin-off titled Restart After Growing Hungry (リスタートはおなかをすかせて, Risutāto wa Onaka o Sukasete). A live-action film adaptation was released on September 4, 2020.

== Plot ==
After being fired from his office job in Tokyo, Mitsuomi Kozaka returns to his hometown for the first time since leaving the countryside in 10 years. As he struggles to win back the approval of his family and his community, he meets Yamato Kumai, a young man adopted by one of his neighbors during his time away.

== Media ==
=== Manga ===
Restart After Come Back Home is written and illustrated by Cocomi. The series was initially published as a short story in vol. 51 of the semi-monthly boys' love manga anthology Canna, which was released on December 22, 2016. Cocomi continued the series beginning in vol. 53 of Canna, which was released on April 21, 2017, where it was serialized sporadically until vol. 61 of Canna, released on August 28, 2018. The chapters were later released in one bound volumes by France Shoin under the Canna Comics imprint.

Following the series' release, a sequel titled Restart After Growing Hungry began serialization in Canna beginning with vol. 69. The story takes place 4 years after the events of Restart After Coming Back Home.

On May 21, 2021, Seven Seas Entertainment announced that they had licensed both books in English for North American distribution.

No.	Title	Original release date	English release date
1	Restart After Coming Back Home; Risutāto wa Tadaima no Ato de (リスタートはただいまのあとで)	January 28, 2019; 978-4-8296-8616-4	November 23, 2021; 978-1-6482-7676-7
2	Restart After Growing Hungry; Risutāto wa Onaka o Sukasete (リスタートはおなかをすかせて)	August 28, 2020; 978-4-8296-8639-3	February 1, 2022; 978-1-6482-7677-4

=== Film ===
A live-action film adaptation was announced in April 2020, starring Yuki Furukawa as Mitsuomi Kozuka and Ryo Ryusei as Yamato. The film is releasing in theaters on September 4, 2020. The film is directed by Ryuta Inoue in his directorial debut and written by Kumiko Sato. Additional cast members include Eri Murakawa, Gaku Sano, Hiroko Nakajima, Yukijirō Hotaru, Masahiro Komoto, and Rena Miura.
