= Blood Honey =

Japanese manga

ブラッド ハニー (Buraddo Hanī)
- Genre: Boys' love
- Manga
- Written by: Sakyou Yozakura
- Published by: Gentosha
- English publisher: NA: Blu Manga
- Published: 2008
- Volumes: 1

Blood Honey is a Japanese manga written and illustrated by Sakyou Yozakura. The name Blood Honey is both Japanese and English. It is licensed in North America by Blu Manga, the boys love division of Tokyopop.

== Reception ==
Leroy Douresseaux describes the story as "a basic mismatched couple story, which even comes with a rival," but enjoyed the portrayal of vampirism in the manga. He also compared Yozakura's art for Yuki as being reminiscent of Marc Davis' Tinkerbell. Johanna Draper Carlson enjoyed the "cute" art, and described the plot's events as "ridiculously outrageous... but amusing in their good-hearted charm." Shaenon Garrity describes it as "a medical fetish manga that happens to have vampires in it," and considered Yokazura's art to be "cute and polished, sexy where it ought to be," but found the cheerful tone of the manga, and the treatment of the medical/blood fetishes as completely normal to be "creepy."
