= Akiyama-kun =

2009 manga series

- Cover of the first manga volume, featuring Akiyama.

秋山くん
- Genre: Romance, Slice of life, Yaoi
- Manga
- Written by: Aiko Nobara
- Published by: Fusion Product; Tokyo Mangasha
- Magazine: Baby (Fusion Product); Cab (Tokyo Mangasha)
- Original run: September 24, 2009 – present
- Volumes: 4
- icon

Akiyama-kun (Japanese: 秋山くん) is a Japanese manga series written and illustrated by Aiko Nobara, serialized in Fusion Product's Baby since 2009. The series has been reprinted by Tokyo Mangasha and it has been collected in three tankōbon volumes as of January 2019. A series of two Drama CDs have also been released.

== Plot ==
When freshman high school student Daisuke Shiba confesses to his delinquent upperclassman Yūji Akiyama in front of all of Akiyama's friends, getting beaten up and ridiculed would be understandable. But the events that follow are nowhere near what any of them would expect, as Shiba ends up starting a relationship with Akiyama.

== Characters ==
Daisuke Shiba (柴 大輔, Shiba Daisuke)
A freshman high school student. Shiba fell in love with Akiyama at first sight, after being rescued by him from some bullies at the beginning of the school year. Sweet and kind, he is willing to do anything for Akiyama. He also has a part-time job in a convenience store.
Yūji Akiyama (秋山 祐二, Akiyama Yūji)
Shiba's upperclassman, a second year student. Akiyama has a reputation of being a juvenile delinquent, but actually he is a calm, friendly and somewhat melancholic boy. He lives alone in a big house and it's hinted that his strained father is the only family he has.
Tomomi Sano (佐野 智美, Sano Tomomi)
Akiyama's friend since middle school. He hates being called by his first name since he considers it a girly name. However, Akiyama is the only one who can call him that way.
Kajiwara (梶原)
Akiyama's friend. He works in a restaurant.
Tata (多田)
Another of Akiyama's friends.
Chie (ちえ)
Shiba's co-worker, a sweet and nice girl.

== Media ==
=== Manga ===
The series started its serialization on September 24, 2009. It is published by Tokyo Mangasha. The first volume was released on 2011 and as of January 2019 three volumes have been released in Japan.

=== Drama CDs ===
A series of two Drama CDs have been released. The first one was launched on September 30, 2012, while the second one on February 22, 2019. The Japanese voice acting cast includes; Yoshitsugu Matsuoka, Kazuyuki Okitsu, Toshiki Masuda, and Yūsuke Shirai.
