= Loving Gaze =

Japanese manga

お隣りビルに恋の視線 (Otonari Biru ni Koi no Shisen)
- Genre: Yaoi
- Manga
- Written by: Akira Kanbe
- Published by: Libre Publishing
- English publisher: NA: Digital Manga Publishing
- Magazine: Magazine Be × Boy
- Published: 10 November 2006

Loving Gaze (お隣りビルに恋の視線, Otonari Biru ni Koi no Shisen) is a Japanese manga written and illustrated by Akira Kanbe. It is licensed in North America by Digital Manga Publishing, which released the manga through its imprint, Juné, on 13 May 2008.

== Reception ==
Leroy Douresseaux, writing for Comic Book Bin, notes Loving Gaze's "deep romantic yearning" and appreciates Kanbe's skill at drawing humans. Rachel Bentham, writing for Active Anime, noted in Kanbe's art "various subtle facial expressions" and enjoyed the "sweet romance" of the tale. Briana Lawrence, writing for Mania Entertainment, disliked the rape tones of the manga, and felt the story was "too stereotypical" to enjoy, although Lawrence was relieved that in the second story the seme did not try to rape the uke.
