= Alley of First Love =

Japanese manga

- Cover of the Japanese version

初恋横丁 (Hatsukoi Yokochō)
- Genre: Yaoi
- Manga
- Written by: Ellie Mamahara
- Published by: Tokuma Shoten
- English publisher: NA: Blu Manga
- Published: August 25, 2006

Alley of First Love (Japanese: 初恋横丁, Hepburn: Hatsukoi Yokochō; billed as "Ellie Mamahara's Alley of First Love" by Blu) is a Japanese boys love manga written and illustrated by Ellie Mamahara. It was released in English by Blu Manga, the boys love publishing division of Tokyopop, in July 2008. It is about a young man whose high school crush returns from studying abroad for six years, and the healing of the rift between them.

== Reception ==
The endearing awkwardness of the couple was remarked upon favourably by Leroy Dessaroux. Danielle Van Gorder enjoyed the boldness of the artwork, but found that the characters looked alike except for their hair. She felt that their expressiveness made up for this. Katherine Farmar praised Mamahara's realistic secondary cast, neither detracting from the main couple, nor making it seem as though the couple exist in a vacuum, and not being simple plot devices to generate conflict. She also enjoyed the "bold" artwork. Katherine Dacey regards their consensual and comparatively tame relationship to be refreshing from other licensed titles available in English, but found that at times the dialogue was unrealistic. In an About.com poll for 2008's best yaoi, Alley of First Love placed seventh out of ten entries.
