= Dick Fight Island =

Japanese manga series

8人の戦士 (Hachinin no Senshi)
- Genre: Adventure, Yaoi
- Manga
- Written by: Reibun Ike
- Published by: Libre
- English publisher: NA: SuBLime
- Original run: 2019 – 2021
- Volumes: 2

Dick Fight Island (Japanese: 8人の戦士, Hepburn: Hachinin no Senshi; Original title: The 8 Warriors) is a Japanese manga comic created by Reibun Ike. Originally published by Libre in Japanese since 2019, it was later released in English by SuBLime, the boys' love imprint of Viz Media on May 11, 2021. The manga is set in a fictional island archipelago only recently discovered by the outside world, where a competition is held every four years to decide the new king. The competition is a fight between champions representing the eight clans, with the man who orgasms first losing the battle.

== Plot ==
Dick Fight Island is set in Pulau Yong'Unda, a fictional archipelago made up of eight islands, that was not discovered by the outside world until the end of the 20th century. The king of the archipelago is decided in a contest held every four years called "The Great Wyrm Tournament", with each of the eight clans that make up the people of the archipelago sending out their own champion. The champions face each other in a series of one-on-one fights, the winner being the person who can make the other orgasm first. Thus, the champions go into their fights with armor that "was designed for the manhood, growing larger and more elaborate by the year." However, in keeping with local custom, the men wear clothes displaying the buttocks, this being considered a proud statement of manliness. The story's central character is Harto, a member of the Jewel Tribe, who has been studying abroad for four years and has returned to take part in the tournament. Harto has learned a "secret trick" that he hopes will allow him to win the tournament. Meanwhile, Harto's boyfriend, Matthew, follows him to Pulau Yong'Unda, jealous of the fact that Harto is being touched by other men.

The second volume explores the events following "The Great Wyrm Tournament," and the relationships that blossom as a result of the tournament's events.

== Reception ==
The series has attracted positive reviews. Briana Lawrence writing for The Mary Sue, praised the premise, humor and plot. She wrote: "What really works for me with Dick Fight Island is that we, the readers, know this is an over-the-top idea, but the characters take great pride in what they do." She appreciated the manga for having more detailed world building than expected for the genre.

Writing for Anime News Network, Rebecca Silverman gave the first volume a rating of 3 out of 5 stars, saying that "it has a good sense of humor about its ludicrous factor ... and it feels like the creator has made an attempt to actually create a fantasy culture rather than letting the concept do all the work." In the same article, Lynzee Loveridge rated it "Oh. My. God." instead of a star rating due to the premise. Loveridge wrote: "I laughed a handful of times and the art is all very attractive."

The first volume of Dick Fight Island released in English topped the Amazon best-seller charts in the "Romance Manga" and "Yaoi & LGBTQ+ Manga" categories, and was second in the "Action & Adventure Manga" category. Ike responded to the news by thanking fans on Twitter in English, and posting a GIF of one of the characters from the series.

The second volume released in English trended on Twitter when a display card at a branch of bookshop Barnes & Noble declared it was approved by the SpongeBob SquarePants character Squidward Tentacles. The volume topped the Amazon best-seller "Yaoi & LGBTQ+ Manga" chart.
