= Akira Kanbe =

Japanese manga artist

Akira Kanbe (かんべあきら, Kanbe Akira) is a Japanese manga artist from Hyōgo Prefecture, known for his work as the illustrator of Mobile Suit Gundam Wing: Episode Zero, specializes in the yaoi genre.

Leroy Dessaroux described Kanbe as being "unusually good at figure drawing", especially drawing people during sex acts. Active Anime's Rachel Bentham commends Hot Limit's art as "racy, sexy and hot", and has praised Kanbe's skill at drawing "subtle facial expressions".

== Bibliography ==
- Tsuki no Umareru Yoru (1995) - Author & Illustrator
- Mobile Suit Gundam Wing: Episode Zero (1997) - Illustrator
- Kimi Made Mousugu (2000) - Author & Illustrator
- Moichido Koishite (2001) - Author & Illustrator
- Hitomi no Mukougawa (2001) - Author & Illustrator
- Yasashiku Sokubaku Shiteageru (2002) - Author & Illustrator
- Keep Out (2002) - Author & Illustrator
- Cool Down (2003) - Author & Illustrator
- Scramble Game (2004) - Author & Illustrator
- Trouble Love Candy (2004) - Author & Illustrator
- Freezing Flame (Kooru Shakunetsu) (2004) - Author & Illustrator
- Bittersweet Café (2005) - Author & Illustrator
- Love or Pride (2006) - Author & Illustrator
- Hot Limit (2006) - Illustrator
- Loving Gaze - (2006) - Author & Illustrator
- Love Wars (2007) - Illustrator
- Blind Love (2007) - Author & Illustrator
- I.D (2008) - Author & Illustrator
- Retsujou no Meikyou (2008) - Author & Illustrator
- Oshigoto no Jikan!? (2009) - Illustrator
