= Kouko Agawa =

Japanese author

Kouko Agawa (阿川好子, Agawa Kōko) is a Japanese author and illustrator, best known for his manga Golden Prince and Argent King (2008) and Love Soul (2012).
