= Brother (manga) =

Japanese manga

- Cover of Brother Vol. 1
- Manga
- Written by: Yuzuha Ougi
- Published by: Kaiōsha
- English publisher: NA: DramaQueen
- Magazine: Gush
- Original run: 2004 – present
- Volumes: 2

Brother is a yaoi manga by Yuzuha Ougi. It has been published in English by DramaQueen in 2005.

== Plot ==
The story is about Asuka Momoki and Yui Momoki who are two stepbrothers who were best friends during their lifetime as kids and young adolescents. But all that changed, they were best friends until an incident they had one day between each other on a hot summer day

Ever since that day, Yui has been avoiding Asuka at all costs, because he is ashamed of what happened. Yui is so ashamed of what happened that he is trying to avoid Asuka so much even going so far as leaving his native Japan to foreign North America to study at one of the schools there, and forget what happened between him and Asuka.

In America, Yui is very successful in what he does: He has become a tennis superstar, and because of his success, Yui feels that he no longer needs a big brother to look after him. In short, Brother is a bittersweet romance about the love that two brothers can have for each other, and the difficult time they can suffer with it.

== Sequel ==
Although a sequel to Brother ("Brother 2") has been released in Japan, DramaQueen has chosen not to release it in the US.
