= 9th Sleep =

Japanese manga

- 9th Sleep Futabasha re-edition
- Genre: Fantasy, yaoi
- Manga
- Written by: Makoto Tateno
- Published by: Biblos (former); Futabasha (current)
- English publisher: NA: Digital Manga Publishing
- Published: April 5, 2004
- Volumes: 1

9th Sleep is a Japanese manga written and illustrated by Makoto Tateno. The manga was first published by Biblos on April 5, 2004, before being re-released by Futabasha on May 12, 2008. It is licensed in North America by Digital Manga Publishing, which released the manga through its imprint, Juné, on December 16, 2009.

== Reception ==
Christopher Nadolski of Mania.com commented that although it seems like a boys love manga, in the end there is "no actual homoerotic payoff for fans of that fare", but feels that the tale "all comes together in a satisfying story of compassion and love." Leroy Douresseaux of Comic Book Bin called the tale "bromance" rather than boys love, and described the plot as the usual Tateno "usual kooky, weird, sci-fi/fantasy scenario", but found it "intriguing" how "she always puts love at the heart of her pulpy nonsense."
