= Private Teacher! =

Japanese manga series

- Cover of the Japanese version of vol. 1, first released on January 1, 2009

カテキョ! (Katekyo!)
- Genre: Yaoi
- Manga
- Written by: Yuu Moegi
- Published by: Core Magazine
- English publisher: NA: Juné
- Imprint: Drap Comics
- Magazine: Drap
- Original run: May 31, 2008 – February 29, 2012
- Volumes: 4
- Manga

Koitomo!?
- Written by: Yuu Moegi
- Published by: Core Magazine
- Imprint: Drap Comics
- Magazine: Drap
- Original run: August 31, 2012 – June 29, 2013
- Volumes: 1

Private Teacher! (Japanese: カテキョ!, Hepburn: Katekyo!) is a Japanese manga series written and illustrated by Yuu Moegi. Private Teacher! was serialized in the monthly yaoi manga magazine Drap from 2008 to 2012. The book was followed up with a one-volume sequel spin-off titled Koitomo!? (コイトモ! ?; "Romantic Partner!?").

== Plot ==
Rintaro Noe, a clumsy high school student, dreads being around his tutor, Kaede Sumizome, who teases him incessantly. However, he doesn't realize that he's attracted to Kaede and that the reason for Kaede's playfulness around him may be because he returns those feelings.

== Characters ==
Rintaro Noe (野江 倫太郎, Noe Rintarō)
Voiced by: Takuma Terashima
Rintaro is a clumsy and airheaded third year high school student who falls in love with Kaede. Halfway into the series, he begins attending college and living with Kaede.
Kaede Sumizome (墨染 楓, Sumizome Kaede)
Voiced by: Daisuke Hirakawa
Kaede is a chemistry major at a prestigious university and becomes Rintaro's tutor. He enjoys teasing Rintaro to see his reactions and is deeply fond of him.
Haruka Kawauchi (河内遥, Kawauchi Haruka)
Voiced by: Tsubasa Yonaga
Haruka is Kaede's cousin who is the same age as Rintaro. His friendly and cutesy behavior is an act that hides his aggressive and sadistic personality. Later, he enrolls in Kaede's college as a law student and pursues Tokiwa, who had helped him find his contact lenses when he was in high school.
Ninose (二ノ瀬)
Voiced by: Hirofumi Nojima
Ninose is Rintaro's high school classmate.
Tokiwa (常磐)
Voiced by: Takuya Satō
Tokiwa is Kaede's colleague who researches at the same laboratory. He has difficulty expressing his emotions.

== Media ==
=== Manga ===
Private Teacher! is written and illustrated by Yuu Moegi. It was serialized in the monthly magazine Drap from the July 2008 issue released on May 31, 2008, to the April 2012 issue released on February 29, 2012. The chapters were later released in 4 bound volumes by Core Magazine under the Drap Comics imprint. In January 2011, Digital Manga Publishing announced that they were distributing the book in English under the Juné imprint.

The series was originally published as a trilogy of short stories from the July 2008 issue to the September 2008 issue. Beginning with the July 2009 issue, Moegi decided to continue the series full-time. During the series' run, Fifth Avenue released a series of audio drama adaptations on CD, with each adapting a volume. The first drama CD, adapting volumes 1 and 2, was released on August 26, 2009. The second drama CD, adapting volume 3, was released on August 24, 2011. The third drama CD, adapting volume 4, was released on August 24, 2012. A special drama CD titled Sweet Horror Night, featuring chapter 8 of volume 3, was released on September 26, 2014.

On December 23, 2015, Moegi released her first artbook, Wedding Night, with artwork from the series and her other works. The artbook also included a bonus comic featuring Kaede and Rintaro.

No.	Original release date	Original ISBN	English release date	English ISBN
1	January 1, 2009	978-4862524669	August 24, 2011	978-1569702338
2	March 3, 2010	978-4862527721	December 19, 2011	978-1569702345
3	August 25, 2011	978-4864361125	April 25, 2012	978-1569702727
4	July 3, 2012	978-4864363396	May 28, 2014	978-1569703212

==== Sequel ====
The series was followed up with a one-volume spin-off titled Koitomo!? (コイトモ! ?), which was a continuation of Haruka and Tokiwa's story from 2010. It was serialized in Drap from the October 2012 issue released on August 31, 2012, to the August 2013 issue released on June 29, 2013. A drama CD adaptation was released on November 13, 2015.

No.	Title	Japanese release date	Japanese ISBN
1	Koitomo!? (コイトモ! ?)	August 24, 2013	978-4864365116

==== Dōjinshi ====
Under the pseudonym "Jari-kengai", Moegi has also self-published unofficial dōjinshi of the series and sold limited copies exclusively at Comiket.

No.	Title	Japanese release date	Japanese ISBN
1	Chocolate Fondue	December 30, 2011	—
2	Lemonade	August 12, 2012	—
3	Milk Soda	August 11, 2013	—

== Reception ==
Volume 3 peaked at #46 on Oricon and sold 18,327 physical copies on its first week of sales.
