= Hot Limit (manga) =

Japanese manga

- Cover of English edition.
- Genre: Yaoi
- Manga
- Written by: Minori Shima
- Illustrated by: Akira Kanbe
- Published by: Nihon Bungeisha
- English publisher: NA: Digital Manga Publishing
- Magazine: Nichibun Comics
- Published: August 28, 2006
- Volumes: 1

Hot Limit is a one-shot Japanese manga written by Minori Shima and illustrated by Akira Kanbe. It was serialised in Nihon Bungeisha's manga magazine, Nichibun Comics. It is licensed in North America by Digital Manga Publishing, which released the manga through its imprint, Juné, on August 12, 2008. Nihon Bungeisha released the manga on August 28, 2006.

== Reception ==
ActiveAnime's Rachel Bentham commends that the manga's art as "racy, sexy and hot". Coolstreak Comics' Leroy Douresseaux comments that the manga "offers the best of BL and yaoi – intense romantic love between two men and hot sex!" Mania.com's Nadia Oxford comments that the manga "remains completely entrenched in yaoi stereotypes. To begin with, Kazuma doesn't begin the story gay, but as soon as he meets Maya, he can't help himself. There's certainly a lot of mystery behind human sexuality, but it seems like Kazuma's love for Shinya/Maya blossoms out of nowhere".
