= Makoto Tateno =

Japanese manga artist

Makoto Tateno 立野 真琴
- Area: Manga artist
- Pseudonym: Shinjuku Tango
- Notable works: Yellow, Happy Boys

Makoto Tateno (立野 真琴, Tateno Makoto; born March 23 in Toyama City), who also uses the pen name Shinjuku Tango, is a Japanese manga artist who made her debut in 1986. Tateno regards her influences as being Go Nagai and Osamu Tezuka. Two of her best-known works are Yellow and Happy Boys. For the latter, she used the actors from the live-action drama for her character design - among them protagonist Kōji Seto and also Gaku Shindou and Kenta Kamakari as gentlemen hosts. Several of her works have been translated into English, including King of Cards, Hate to Love You, Omen, Red Angel, 9th Sleep, Hero Heel, Ka Shin Fu, Steal Moon, and Yellow.

== Selected works ==
Title	Year	Notes	Refs
King of Cards	1999		
Hate to Love You	2001		
Yellow	2002		
Yokan (予感; Omen)	2003		
ja:CUTE×GUY	2004		
Akai Tenshi (赤い天使, Red Angel)	2004		
9th Sleep	2004		
Hero Heel	2005		
Ka Shin Fu	2006		
Steal Moon	2006		
Blue Sheep Reverie	2006		
Angelic Runes	2007		
