= Steal Moon =

Japanese manga series

- Cover of the first volume of Steal Moon
- Genre: Romance, Yaoi, Science fiction
- Manga
- Written by: Makoto Tateno
- Published by: Nihonbungeisha
- English publisher: NA: Digital Manga Publishing
- Original run: July 28, 2006 – May 28, 2007
- Volumes: 2

Steal Moon is a Japanese manga written and illustrated by Makoto Tateno. The manga is published in Japan by Nihonbungeisha and in Taiwan by Ever Glory Publishing.

The manga is licensed for an English-language release in North America by Digital Manga Publishing.

== Plot ==
Nozomi earns money through street fights. One day, he meets a stronger man named Coyote, who gets him to bet his freedom on the outcome of their fight. Nozomi loses and becomes Coyote's slave and has to work in an online peep room known as "Digital Angels", and for a group of mysterious men who call themselves "Serene". They inform him of a secret surveillance camera that watches over the city, which they plan to destroy. Nozomi works with them to stop the camera, and to buy his freedom so that he can return to his normal life.

== Reception ==
Mania.com's Danielle Van Gorder commends the manga for its plot. Comic Book Bin's Leroy Douresseaux comments that the manga is more sci-fi than it is yaoi.
