= ComicFesta =

Japanese webcomic website

ComicFesta is a digital comic platform operated by WWWave Corporation, focused on manga with sexual content.

== AnimeFesta ==
In March 2017, ComicFesta added an anime streaming service called "Anime Zone" to their website. It was rebranded as "ComicFesta Anime" in February 2019, and then as "AnimeFesta" in May 2021.

In addition to existing anime, the platform also streams ecchi anime based on comics originally distributed by ComicFesta, such as On a Lustful Night Mingling with a Priest. As these comics include TL comics, MENS comics, BL comics, or adult comics which feature mature content, the platform also produces and distributes an exclusive adult-rated "complete versions" of those anime.

Anime originally created by the platform are also aired on television channels and streamed by other internet platforms, either as regular versions or R-15 versions with varying degrees of censorship.
