= Teens' love =

Japanese erotica fiction marketed towards women

Teens' love (TL) (Japanese: ティーンズラブ) is a subgenre of Japanese women's comics that has been established since the 2000s, characterized by romantic and sexually explicit relationships between male and female protagonists, which have varying levels of plot development alongside the sexual relationship between the protagonists. It developed out of the concept to "show what happens next" in a traditional shōjo manga love story. TL stories typically involve more romantic emotional development alongside the sexual relationship compared to sexually explicit media aimed at men. They are often set in modern Japanese settings such as offices, but also frequently feature in fantasy or isekai worlds.

Typical characters in TLs are college students or young office workers ranging from their late teens through to their late 20s, although it is not uncommon to see older protagonists as well, especially male romantic interests. Teens' love is represented in a range of media in novels, comics, live-action dramas, and beyond. Due to its origins stemming out of shōjo manga, it is aimed at a core target audience ranging from older teenage girls to adult women.

TL has been criticized for its depictions of sexual violence and approach to consent, as well as its avoidance of topics like contraception and sexually transmitted disease prevention.

== Historical development and media ==
Although Teens' Love (TL) comics have been an officially established subgenre of Japanese women's comics since the 2000s, they first began appearing in the 1990s aimed at teenage girls of that time. In the modern day, the age of TL readership is more expansive ranging from late teens to mid-30s.

Teens' Love is primarily created by female artists and appeals to a primarily female readership, and is also aimed at a younger audience than traditional Ladie's Comics. In a survey of Japanese university students, 1.3 % of respondents said they had read TL in the past and 4.8 % said they were currently reading TL. As restrictions on sexually explicit material became stricter in the 2010s, fewer and fewer brick and mortar bookstores began to stock the magazines, leading to an early shift to electronic publishing becoming mainstream.

The genre name “Teen's Love” became established around 2002, and the first TL magazine was published in 1998. Publishing was particularly strong from the mid-2000s to 2010, with a number of specialized belles-lettres labels emerging.

TL is present in various media, including Anime, Manga, Light Novels, Card Games and e-books. There are publications that started out as books and have been published online, and vice versa. Consumption is increasingly switching to electronic distribution, following global media trends for traditional and erotic media specifically. Many digital platforms which host Teens' Love stories categorize it under its own category of media. While Teens' Love was originally dominated by manga, novels have become more and more dominant during the 2020s, publishing under various specialized labels for Teens' Love. TL comics specifically are primarily distributed via magazines.

== Characteristics ==
The genre is unfamiliar to most readers among women's media, so there are few reviews or studies, and the published analyses focus mainly on general discussions of the genre as a whole, i.e. the types and characteristics of TL manga, because most TL manga, like lady comics, are read casually and discarded as a pastime.

=== Plot locations ===
Modern Japan is a common setting for TL stories, although setting can frequently remain an afterthought compared to other themes in TL manga. Specifically, college campuses and offices are the most common settings, although general neighborhood settings can also feature in TL stories

In addition to these scenarios, a subsection of TL stories are set in fantasy worlds, often with reincarnation elements. Another subsection will be set in historical eras such as the Taisho period. Science fiction or futuristic settings are rare in TL stories.

=== Motives ===
Common plot devices that lead into the formation of the central relationship development include dramatic encounters like reunions or potential partners who meet by chance. Another common plot device in TL stories is the "unexpected marriage" that occur under unusual circumstances. However, there are also stories without major incidents and a more gradual emotional relationship progression in spite of early sexual encounters.

=== Age ===
The age of the people depicted is usually in their late 20s. The next most common age group is heroines, aged 23 to 25, and the heroes are often in their early 30s. The age ranges in the more fantastical genres like “Isekai reincarnation” and “Historical” are generally a bit younger if specified at all.

=== Romantic experiences ===
Heroines tend to be described less in terms of their romantic experiences, though as a trend tend to have fewer romantic encounters than the male protagonists. Often, heroines who have had romantic experiences do not have very good memories of their previous relationships. The impression is given that previous partners are portrayed in the story in order to create a contrast in the form of “the love with the hero is great this time and cannot be compared with their previous boyfriends”.

The heroes, on the other hand, are rarely portrayed as inexperienced, but rather as people with some or more experience. However, this experience is not mentioned for the most part, but is portrayed indirectly. Frequently in Teens' Love the male protagonists are expected to take the initiative decisively, to show fewer doubts, and to avoid comparison with the female protagonist's previous partners.

=== Development of the relationship ===
Often, the focus of the story is on the female protagonist's psychology and perspective, although the male protagonist's inner thoughts or perspective can be shown in some works as well. A common trend in TL is to depict the establishment or reunion of a romantic relationship, but less frequently showing how the characters maintain a romantic relationship. Another common trope in TL is for the start of the relationship to begin as a physical encounter, and then depict the emotional aspects of the relationship later on.

Confessions of love are a central part of the plot, often initiated by the hero, whose affection can frequently drives the relationship forward. Mutual affection is often symbolized by physical gestures such as French kisses, hugs or holding hands. Kisses in particular are seen as an indispensable confirmation of love distinct but not unrelated to the physical relationship.

=== Conflicts ===
Problems that characters solve through either collaboration or the strength of their relationship are a typical stylistic element of TLs. The heroines' problems tend to be the focus. Common examples include work worries, career difficulties, family conflicts, or worries about self-realization.

=== Depictions of love rivals ===
A frequent plot point is the appearance of love rivals, frequently male, which were noted to appear in around 40 % of TL stories, although female rivals were noted to appear in 20 % of TL stories.

== Genre overlaps and differences ==
TL builds on genres such as Shōjo, Ladie's Comics and Josei manga, and Boys Love, BL is similar in style and story development, and the name of the genre was also influenced by Boys Love. The romantic relationships in TL are stylistically based on shojo manga. TL differs from BL in its depiction of heterosexuality and differs from shōjo manga in the detail and frequency of sex scenes. Teens' Love manga is also distinctly different from the redicomi in that the illustrations in ladies' comics are more dramatic while the illustrations in TL manga (Teens Love) are more cutesy. Another key characteristic is that TL do not directly depict genitalia, but instead create a glamorous atmosphere by using tone patterns designs in the background. Redicomi comics also differ from TL in that characters and settings are more fleshed out, due to the emphasis on romance, and the process leading up to sex is relatively long, as romance and sex are closely linked. The drawing style of TL differs from Redicomi by using very thin lines and soft background effects, and the inner descriptions (monologues) of the protagonist are important for the development of the story. In contrast to the josei genre, which often deals with dramatic and controversial topics such as rape, incest or enjo kōsai (relationships for reward), modern TL works largely avoid such content, apart from a few early publications.

Horis argued and suggested that TL are not pornography even though they contain sexual acts. They are instead, according to her, in the category of female-oriented manga (containing sexual expressions) in the Japanese market, along with redicomi and BL manga, she reasoned that unlike pornography as it is known, TL manga are not realistic and as they are not about satisfying the sexual desires of men. This reasoning as TL in the category of female-oriented manga with sexual expression was based on the fact that pornography has historically been an exclusive domain of men in the West and was molded to serve the male gaze by showing real actors performing sexual acts, making it difficult to apply to mass media used by women.

== Critical analysis ==
Tashiro Mieko describes TL magazines such as Love S-girl, Advanced Love Mint and Love Love MAX as works in which sexual acts often take place on the same day that the protagonists fall in love. Sex is portrayed as the “happy destination of romance”. The stories often include scenarios such as “acquaintance rape”, which nevertheless conclude with a happy ending in which the female protagonist is forced to have sex and refuses to do so. Tashiro criticizes the fact that such depictions are often portrayed from the perspective of the sexually violent perpetrators, which creates the impression that the victim may not fully reject the acts, even if they show resistance. He also criticizes the lack of topics such as contraception and the prevention of sexually transmitted diseases, although sex scenes form a central part of the stories. He questions whether the lack of depiction of contraception and prevention of sexually transmitted diseases in sex scenes is justified, even if this may amount to a “demand for something unrealistic”. He also criticizes the fact that violent and criminal acts such as “acquaintance rape” are often normalized. He describes TL comics as a sexist and violence-glorifying source of sexual information that is heavily influenced by gender-specific prejudices. The works often show male-dominated, forced sexual acts, while women are portrayed as passive and without self-determination. This makes it clear that the stories in the TL genre convey a “superiority of love”. At first glance, they seem to emphasize the positive sides of love and sexuality by presenting the schema “love = happiness” and “sexual activity = pleasure”.
