= Mei Matsuoka =

Japanese-English children's illustrator and author

- Born: March 27, 1981 (age 45); Suginami-ku, Japan
- Education: Kingston University
- Occupations: Illustrator and author
- Website: www.meimatsuoka.com

Mei Matsuoka (born 27 March 1981) is a Japanese-English children's illustrator and author.

== Biography ==
=== Early life and education ===
Born in Suginami-ku, Tokyo, Japan, Matsuoka spent the early part of her childhood there before moving to England at the age of 11, settling in the Cotswolds.

She graduated from Kingston University with a BA Hons in Illustration, and has since been working as a freelance illustrator, specialising in children's books.

=== Career ===
Matsuoke wrote and illustrated Ten-san, Kame-san and Muri-san go on a Journey which won the 2004 Annual 'Aozora' Environmental Picture Book competition. Burger Boy by Alan Durant, won the "Portsmouth Children's Book" award in January 2007.

Matsuoke wrote and illustrated her book Footprints in the Snow, which was published by Andersen Press in 2007. This book was shortlisted for the "Read it Again! The Cambridgeshire Children's Picture Book Awards" in December 2007. In January 2008, the book was longlisted for the Booktrust Big Pictures's "Best New Illustrator Award". Footprints in the Snow has also been nominated for the 2009 Kate Greenaway Medal.

Footprints in the Snow has been translated into Welsh, and published by Cymdeithas Lyfrau Ceredigion under the title Olion yn yr Eira, and was 10th on the Welsh Books Council's list of children's bestsellers in September 2007.

== Works illustrated ==
- Ten-san, Kame-san and Muri-san go on a Journey, Mei Matsuoka, April 2005, All Nippon Air Line
- Burger Boy, Alan Durant, October 2005, Andersen Press
- Hannibals Marchen, Boris von Smercek, May 2006, Simon & Schuster
- A Friend for All Seasons, Julia Hubery, September 2006, Simon & Schuster
- Footprints in the Snow, Mei Matsuoka, October 2007, Andersen Press
