= Awaken Forest =

Manga by Yuna Aoi

- Cover of Awaken Forest as published by Taiyo Tosho

目覚めの森 (Mezame no Mori)
- Genre: Yaoi
- Manga
- Written by: Yuna Aoi
- Published by: Taiyo Tosho
- English publisher: NA: Digital Manga Publishing
- Published: March 15, 2006
- Volumes: 1

Awaken Forest (Japanese: 目覚めの森, Hepburn: Mezame no Mori) is a one-shot Japanese manga written and illustrated by Yuna Aoi published by Taiyoh Tosho on March 15, 2006. It is licensed in North America by Digital Manga Publishing, which released the manga through its imprint, Juné, on May 6, 2009.

== Plot ==
Yoshimoto is a rising editor who has a chance meeting with the wheelchair-using author, Orito Suga, and his brother, Masato, at an industry bash. Masato's sad, yet alluring, smile entices Yoshimoto and leaves a strong impression on him. Shortly after their first encounter, Orito unexpectedly offers the young editor a position and Yoshimoto is asked to move in with him and his brother Will a connection arise between Yoshimoto and Orito or between Yoshimoto and Masato?

== Reception ==
Leroy Douresseaux, writing for Comic Book Bin, described the art as "pretty", finding it incongruous with the "screwed up" psychological nature of the stories, describing it as being "a damn good read – tawdry and scandalous the way good romantic fiction should be." Holly Ellingwood, writing for Active Anime enjoyed the presentation of obsessive love.

== See also ==
- Jazz
