= Tenka =

Tenka may refer to:

== People ==
- Tenka Hashimoto (橋本 甜歌; born 1993), Japanese Tarento
- Tenka Stefanović (1797–1865), Serbian politician

== Other uses ==
- Tenka (river), a river in Russia
- Tenka-Goken, a group of five Japanese swords
- Tenka (kaika), a mysterious fire in Japanese folklore
- Lifeforce Tenka, also known as just "Tenka", a first-person shooter for PC
- Princess Ninja Scroll: Tenka Musō, also known as Tenka Musō, a 2-volume shōnen manga
