= Duetto =

Duetto may refer to:

== Music ==
=== Compositions ===
- Duetto, fugue for violin and oboe Edward Elgar
- Duetto, for chamber ensemble by Rossini
- No. 6 Andante con moto in A-flat major from Op. 38 Songs Without Words book 3 by Felix Mendelssohn
- Duetto per Violoncello e Contrabasso, by Gioachino Rossini (1824)
- Duetto, for strings by William Blezard (1921-2003)
- Duetto, several compositions by Wilhelm Friedemann Bach

=== Band ===
- Duetto (duo), formed 2017

=== Albums ===
- Duetto, a 2003 recital album by Marcelo Álvarez and Salvatore Licitra
- Duetto, album by Mina Mazzini and Lucio Battisti

== Other ==
- Duetto, Alfa Romeo Spider
- Duetto (manga)
