= Don't Blame Me =

Don't Blame Me may refer to:

- Don't Blame Me (TV series), an Australian children's program
- Don't Blame Me (manga)
- Don't Blame Me (album) by Marc Ribot
- "Don't Blame Me" (Dorothy Fields and Jimmy McHugh song), first published in 1933
- "Don't Blame Me" (Taylor Swift song), from the album Reputation (2017)
- "Don't Blame Me", a song by Little River Band from Playing to Win
- "Don't Blame Me", a song by James Marriott from Are We There Yet? (2023)
- "Don't Blame Me", a B-side track by Ozzy Osbourne's on the single "Mama, I'm Coming Home"
- "Don't Blame Me", a song by Santigold from I Don't Want: The Gold Fire Sessions
- Don't Blame Me, an album by Steve Goodman
