= Dust 8 =

Osamu Tezuka's Manga Works

ダスト8 (dasutoeito)
- Genre: Science fiction
- Manga
- Written by: Osamu Tezuka
- Published by: Kodansha.,Akita Shoten, Rittor Music
- English publisher: Digital Manga
- Magazine: Weekly Shōnen Sunday
- Original run: January 9, 1972 – May 14, 1972
- Volumes: 2
- icon

Dust 8 (Japanese: ダスト8, Hepburn: dasutoeito) is a Japanese manga by Osamu Tezuka. The original title was "Dust 18".

== Outline ==
The story was serialized in Shogakukan's Weekly Shonen Sunday in 1972 under the title "Dust 18". Due to lack of popularity, the series was discontinued in that same year. The work depicts the interactions between once deceased people who have been revived by the "Stone of Life" and the entities called "Kikimora" who are trying to recover it. The original title was derived from the fact that it was planned to have 18 episodes, but due its cancellation, only 6 episodes could be drawn. The publication of the book would take a while, when Kodansha published the "Osamu Tezuka Complete Manga Works", they added two more episodes, rewrote the whole story, changed the title to "Dust 8", and included it in the collection. The revised version was more than 100 pages long, and the ending was also changed. In the "Afterword" to the "Osamu Tezuka Complete Manga Works", Tezuka states that he broke the rule of not making extreme changes to the content of the stories when he published them in the collection because they were "incoherent and completely unpopular". In 2018, a reprint of the original version of Dust 18 was published by Rittor Music.

The work assigns one episode to each of the eight final survivors. Since there is almost no connection between the episodes, it takes on a kind of omnibus format.

This work was created at a time when Tezuka's popularity was waning, and while dramatic-style manga was being praised, Tezuka's distress was evident in the work itself, as the feeling of the drawings varied, perhaps influenced by the popularity of darker-themed manga at the time.

In the "Afterword" of the Osamu Tezuka Manga Collection edition of "Alabaster (manga)," Tezuka himself cited this work as one of the works that he "just couldn't get into, no matter how many publishers asked me to make it into a book". On the other hand, Takashi Hamada, who planned the reprint of the original "Dust 18," said, "When I reread it after publication, many people responded that it was definitely more interesting than "Dust 8" ("Dust 18" was revised and retitled for the book), which was altered for inclusion in Kodansha's complete works. I realized once again that I shouldn't take Tezuka-sensei's words for granted."

In 2019, a stage adaptation of this work, "The Devil and the Angel" from Osamu Tezuka's "Dust 8" was staged in commemoration of the 90th anniversary of Tezuka's birth. The lead role was played by Alisa Mizuki.

== Plot ==
A passenger plane bound for Fukuoka crashes on an unknown island. While most of the passengers lose their lives, only ten survive as they came into contact with the "Mountain of Life" just before the crash, and the power of the fragments brought them back to life. Eight of the survivors quickly escape from the island and return to the human world. On the other hand, the Black Shadow who rules the island makes a deal with the two children who failed to escape, Misaki and Satsuki, offering to spare their lives if they take the stone from the other eight. Satsuki is willing to accept the offer, but Misaki, who doesn't want to be a murderer, is very much against it, and the two get into a tussle. Misaki forces Satsuki to throw away the stone, and after confirming Satsuki's death, she throws away the stone herself and dies. Afterwards, the Black Shadow orders the Kikimora, the guardians of the Mountain of Life, to retrieve the eight stones that have returned to the human world. Two Kikimora (husband and wife) enter the bodies of the two children who died after giving up their stones, and begin to track down the remaining eight survivors who have returned to their normal lives. Some try to protect the stone, while others try to live out their lives in the time they have left.

== Characters ==
Kikimora

- A being that is neither a creature nor spirit that lives on the island where the passenger plane crashed. It has the appearance of a weasel, and can possess the bodies of dead people. After possession, the captive becomes entirely different from the person they were before, even taking on a different appearance. In the magazine version, when a kikimora possesses the body of a dead person, they are able to inherit their original personality, but in the book version, this is changed. In the magazine version, the female Kikimora named Wu is in charge of retrieving the stone, and the male Kikimora named Mu is in charge of interfering with her, but in the book version, these names are removed and the two Kikimora (husband and wife) are set up as a pair, working together to retrieve the stone.

Misaki

- A boy who is one of the survivors. He wakes up after the crash, but all the survivors had already escaped, leaving him behind on the Island with a young girl named Satsuki. The "Black Shadow" of the island tells him that he is alive thanks to the stone, and presses him to return it. Misaki tried to return the stone, saying that he had no choice if he was doomed to die, but Satsuki was against this and wanted to survive. The Black Shadow offered the survivors a deal: if they gave the stone back to him, he would spare their lives. Satsuki was willing to accept the deal, but Misaki knew that if he took the stones from the eight survivors, they would die. He did not want to be a murderer, so he tried to force Satsuki to throw away the stones. They fight, and in the struggle Satsuki's stone is thrown, killing her instantly. After confirming Satsuki's death, he throws away his own stone and collapses to his death. A male Kikimora named Mu then attaches itself to his corpse. Mu leaves the island with the task of collecting the stones of the survivors. Along the way he tries to earn money by extorting the survivors with death hanging over their heads to earn a living. In the magazine version, the Kikimora inherited Misaki's personality when he attached himself, but in the book version, this is changed.

Satsuki

- A young girl who survived the plane crash. Like Misaki, she woke up after the other survivors had escaped, and was left behind on the island. "The Black Shadow ordered them to return the stone to him, but when they complained that they didn't want to die, the Black Shadow offered to spare their lives if they retrieved the stone from the eight survivors. She was willing to accept the offer, but Misaki, who did not want to become a murderer, forced her to return the stone. In the end, both children lose their stones and die on the island. A female Kikimora named Wu attaches herself to her corpse and leaves the island. She works on pursuing the survivors, urging them to return their stones. In the magazine version of the story, the Kikimora inherited Satsuki's personality when she attached herself, but in the book version, this is no longer the case.

(Dust No. 1)

- An office worker that is one of the survivors. Just as he arrives at the airport after being rescued, he loses his life when a female Kikimora steals his stone.

(Dust No. 2)

- A businessman that is one of the survivors. He tries to escape from Kikimora and the others by bribing them with money and luxuries. In the end he dies when his stone is taken from him during a car accident.

(Dust No. 3)

- Midori Asa, a disc jockey who is one of the survivors. When confronted with death, she bargains with the kikimora for more time. She gets a week to live, and uses this time trying to save the life of a political prisoner who is under sentence of death in Country Z. Once completing her goal, her stone is taken.

(Dust No.4)

- Yoshio Kashiwagi, one of the survivors who is a famous thrillseeker. He competes in jumping over cliffs in a racing car. Due to surviving a near-death accident he feels invincible. His real source of courage is actually his stone of life that protects him. This all changes when he is visited by the Kikimora. While distracted he accidentally kills a girl during a stunt. Forfeiting his life, he gives the stone to revive the girl and does one final stunt as he dies

(Dust No.5)

- Eriko is a poor girl dealing with the death of her mother. She is forced to work for free for the owner of a tavern she's indebted to. The male Kikimora meets Eriko in search of her mother, who was one of the survivors. With the mother deceased, Eriko is now the holder of the stone. Mu knows he needs to take the stone but when he learns that she has an incurable disease, he takes pity on her. Mu begins to develop feelings for the girl and the two run away to live together. Eriko's illness only worsens, leaving her on the brink of death. Defying his boss' orders, Mu lets Eriko have the stone of life, but leaves her so he can keep collecting other stones.

(Dust No.6)

- A Japanese pilot for a small airline who is a survivor. While flying an American zoologist in a small plane, he crash-lands on Mindanao Island in the Philippines due to a gasoline leak. After the crash, the two find themselves against a delusional man believing himself to be a Japanese soldier when there is no war going on. The man cannot be reasoned with and wants the American woman dead. When confronted with death, the pilot uses his time to save the female zoologist

(Dust No. 7)

- A painter who is one of the survivors. When his work is not well received and his life is at a standstill, the Kikimora appear. In exchange for a stone, the painter asks to know if his paintings will be appreciated after his death before he goes to the other side. Taking a look into the future, the man sees his work goes unnoticed. However a young boy inherits the man's paintings and they inspire him into becoming a famous artist. Satisfied, the painter goes to heaven.

(Dust No. 8)

- Dr. Kurushima, one of the survivors and a leading researcher in robotics. He crushes the "Stone of Life" and gives it to a robot that takes on the role of his deceased wife Kaori. The robot takes on human emotion but hungers for more power. Eventually it becomes too powerful and explodes, killing the man and his robot wife in a lovers suicide.
