= Freefall Romance =

Japanese manga

- Cover of the Japanese version

落下速度 (Rakka Sokudo)
- Genre: Yaoi
- Manga
- Written by: Hyouta Fujiyama
- Published by: Frontier Works
- English publisher: NA: Digital Manga Publishing
- Magazine: Daria
- Published: April 22, 2004
- Volumes: 1

Freefall Romance (Japanese: 落下速度, Hepburn: Rakka Sokudo) is a Japanese manga written and illustrated by Hyouta Fujiyama. It is licensed in North America by Digital Manga Publishing, which released the manga through its imprint, Juné, on September 26, 2007. Freefall Romance is the story of a man who gripes to his drinking buddy about his younger brother's gay relationship in Kinsei High. The two men become drunker than usual and end up in bed together.

== Reception ==
Mania Entertainment's Danielle Van Gorder said that the "story is well written, the characters are fully realized and believable, and the emotions they display and the actions they take as their own feelings fly out of their control is something that feels incredibly authentic", and Van Gorder regarded it as the best of Fujiama's work that she'd read. Holly Ellingwood, writing for Active Anime enjoyed the "grounded nature" of the relationship, although she felt it was strange that the brothers were not really shown interacting until almost the end of the manga, the younger brother serving more as a "catalyst". Katherine Farmar, writing for Comics Village, felt the manga was "organic", in that the issues facing the couple and their desire for one another came from their characters. Shaenon Garrity, writing for the appendix to Manga: The Complete Guide, felt Freefall Romance "takes its time getting to the sex", which gives the author space to develop the characters. Garrity also enjoyed the "touch of realism" as the characters adjust themselves to their "new identity as a gay couple".

== See also ==
- Ordinary Crush - another of Fujiyama's manga set in Kinsei High.
