= Kabuki (disambiguation) =

Kabuki is a form of traditional Japanese theater.

Kabuki may also refer to:

== People and characters ==
- Akihisa Mera (born 1948), a Japanese professional wrestler best known as The Great Kabuki
- The Kabuki Warriors, a Japanese professional wrestling women's tag team made up of Asuka (wrestler) and Kairi Sane
- Kamen Rider Kabuki, a character from Kamen Rider Hibiki
- Kabuki, a character from the David Mack comic book Kabuki

== Literature ==
- Kabuki (David W. Mack comic), a comic book series by artist and writer David Mack
- Kabuki (manga), a manga by Yukari Hashida

== Other uses ==
- Kabuki dance, a term used by American political pundits as a synonym for political posturing
- Kabuki brush, a make-up brush
- "Kabuki", a song from the album Adult by Tokyo Jihen

== See also ==
- Kabuki syndrome, a rare genetic disorder characterised by facial dysmorphism
