= Dash! =

Japanese manga anthology

ダッシュ！ (Dasshu!)
- Genre: School, Yaoi
- Manga
- Written by: Isaku Natsume
- Published by: Oakla Publishing
- English publisher: NA: Digital Manga Publishing JManga
- Published: 12 August 2016

Dash! (ダッシュ！, Dasshu!) is a Japanese manga anthology comprising two stories written and illustrated by Isaku Natsume. It is licensed for sale in North America by Digital Manga Publishing, which released the manga on 25 November 2007.

== Reception ==
Julie Rosato, writing for Mania Entertainment, noted that the character designs were on the masculine side of bishōnen, and that as a result the characters did not "look their age," but Rosato found this refreshing. She felt the character designs conveyed a sense of personality through to the reader. Although she noted the story was "similar to others" where there was a "younger, aggressive seme and a reluctant, prideful half who gradually acquiesces to feelings", she found the characters to be likable. Holly Ellingwood, writing for Active Anime, compared Dash! to Our Kingdom and felt there was a definite "chemistry" between the two lead characters. Comics Village's Katherine Farmar noted that neither of the stories were "particularly original", but felt the first story was an "enjoyable" take on the high school romance plot. Farmar enjoyed the "natural and unforced" progression of the relationship between the characters in the Dash! story, not becoming frustrated with them at all.
