= Kanoko =

- Gender: Female

Origin
- Origin: Japanese
- Meaning: Different meanings depending on the kanji used

Kanoko (written: 鹿子, 鹿乃子, かの子 or かのこ in hiragana) is a feminine Japanese given name. Notable people with the name include:

- Kanoko Goto (後藤 鹿子; born 1975), Japanese cross-country skier
- Kanoko Okamoto (岡本 かの子; 1889–1939), Japanese writer, poet and Buddhist scholar
- Kanoko Sakurakoji (桜小路 かのこ), Japanese manga artist
- Kanoko Tsutani-Mabuchi (津谷-馬淵 鹿乃子; born 1938), Japanese diver

== Fictional characters ==
- Kanoko (カノコ), a character in the anime series Sweet Valerian
- Kanoko Kikuchiya (菊池屋 花乃子), a character in the manga series Velvet Kiss
- Kanoko Naedoko (苗床 かのこ), protagonist of the manga series The Secret Notes of Lady Kanoko
- Kanoko Yuki (結希 かの子), a character in the anime series Maho Girls PreCure!

== See also ==
- Kanoko Dam, a dam in Hokkaidō, Japan
