= Junior Escort =

Japanese manga series

- Genre: Yaoi
- Manga
- Written by: Sakurako Hanafubuki
- Published by: Houbunsha
- English publisher: NA: Digital Manga Publishing
- Published: 2001
- Manga

Love Code
- Written by: Sakurako Hanafubuki
- Published by: Houbunsha
- English publisher: NA: Digital Manga Publishing
- Published: 2002
- Manga

Crazy Star
- Written by: Sakurako Hanafubuki
- Published by: Houbunsha
- English publisher: NA: Digital Manga Publishing
- Published: 2003
- Manga

Shining Moon
- Written by: Sakurako Hanafubuki
- Published by: Houbunsha
- English publisher: NA: Digital Manga Publishing
- Published: 2003

Junior Escort (少年娼婦, Shōnen Shōfu) also known as Sweet Slave Scandal!, is a Japanese manga series written and illustrated by Sakurako Hanafubuki and published by Houbunsha. It is licensed in North America by Digital Manga Publishing, which released the manga on March 25, 2008. It comprises four volumes, the first called Junior Escort, the second called Love Code, the third called Crazy Star, and last, a prequel called Shining Moon.

== Reception ==
Comic Book Bin said that Junior Escort "refuses to be ordinary", and is a "spicy yaoi manga". Leroy Dessaroux appreciated the author getting inside one of the lead's heads more.
