= The Way to Heaven =

Japanese manga

- English edition
- Genre: Yaoi
- Manga
- Written by: Yamimaru Enjin
- Published by: Biblos
- English publisher: NA: Digital Manga Publishing
- Published: February 11, 2009
- Volumes: 1

The Way To Heaven (Japanese: 天国へ行けばいい, Hepburn: Tengoku e Ikebaii) is a one-shot Japanese manga written and illustrated by Yamimaru Enjin, author of the manga Voice or Noise and illustrator of the novel Eat or Be Eaten. It is licensed in North America by Digital Manga Publishing, which released the manga through its imprint, Juné, on February 11, 2009.

== Reception ==
Patricia Beard criticises the manga for its "flawed narrative" but commends the manga for its "wonderful character designs and artwork". Leroy Douresseaux comments that the manga is "more philosophical than sexual". Holly Ellingwood commends the manga's art as "alluring as the immersing story".
