= Love Is Like a Hurricane =

Japanese manga

恋はいつも嵐のように (Koi wa Itsumo Arashi no You ni)
- Genre: Yaoi
- Manga
- Written by: Tokiya Shimazaki
- Published by: Kousai Shobou
- English publisher: NA: 801 Media
- Original run: 2001 – 2005
- Volumes: 5

Love is Like a Hurricane (恋はいつも嵐のように, Koi wa Itsumo Arashi no You ni) is a Japanese manga written and illustrated by Tokiya Shimazaki. It is licensed in North America by 801 Media, which released the five volumes between June 2007 and June 2008.

== Reception ==
Jason Thompson compared Love is Like a Hurricane to World's End for the appendix to Manga: The Complete Guide, calling the former a "frivolous “LOL rape” yaoi story". Hannah Santiago later said of the manga that it had "plenty of sex, if you don’t need plot or emotion to add context to the scenes". Danielle Van Gorder, writing for Mania Entertainment, describes the first volume as "BL fluff", despite the non-consensual sex set-up, and appreciated the greater depth of characterisation in the second volume. Van Gorder felt that the third volume was "an attempt to play up to one fetish after another", and that the series as a whole felt like a "parody of the BL genre". Leroy Douresseaux felt that the many sex scenes of Love is Like a Hurricane was "something worth celebrating", although that as a high school story, the manga was "silly and inconsequential". Van Gorder felt that by the fifth and final volume, the formula of the series "was starting to run out of steam". Leroy Douresseaux felt that the fifth volume "telegraphed its ending" and was not as lively as the fourth volume.
