= S (novel series) =

Japanese light novel series

- Cover of first volume of S as published by Taiyoh Tosho

エス (Esu)
- Genre: Yaoi
- Light novel
- Written by: Saki Aida
- Illustrated by: Chiharu Nara
- Published by: Taiyoh Tosho
- English publisher: NA: Digital Manga Publishing
- Original run: February 10, 2005 – October 27, 2006
- Volumes: 4

S (Japanese: エス, Hepburn: Esu) is a light novel series with homoerotic themes written by Saki Aida with art by Chiharu Nara. It is about a detective who goes undercover and who begins a relationship with his "S" – his spy. It was published in English by Digital Manga Publishing between May 2008 and February 2009.

== Reception ==
Holly Ellingwood, writing for Active Anime, praised the "gripping" writing of the second novel and enjoyed the suspense of the third novel, recommending it to fans of Yellow. Michelle Smith, writing for PopCultureShock, said that she found the fourth volume to be "better than most" other yaoi novels, appreciating that the story was "trying to be about something more than sex".
