= Red (manga) =

Japanese manga by Sanae Rokuya

- Cover of Red as published by Digital Manga Publishing

レッド (Reddo)
- Genre: Yaoi
- Manga
- Written by: Sanae Rokuya
- Published by: Taiyoh Tosho
- English publisher: NA: Digital Manga Publishing
- Published: April 14, 2006
- Volumes: 1

Red (Japanese: レッド, Hepburn: Reddo) is a Japanese one-shot manga written and illustrated by Sanae Rokuya. It is licensed in North America by Digital Manga Publishing, which released the manga on 27 May 2008.

== Reception ==
Leroy Douresseaux noted there were no sex scenes, instead there were kiss scenes, making this title teen-appropriate, but felt that without the character design, the manga was "pedestrian". Danielle Van Gorder found her layouts "striking" and enjoyed the gradual unfurling of the story. Holly Ellingwood enjoyed the "compelling" story.
