= Not Enough Time (manga) =

Japanese manga written and illustrated by Shoko Hidaka

- Cover for the North American release of the manga

足りない時間 (Tarinai Jikan)
- Genre: Yaoi, Romance
- Manga
- Written by: Shoko Hidaka
- Published by: Houbunsha
- English publisher: Digital Manga Publishing
- Published: October 28, 2005
- Volumes: 1

Not Enough Time (足りない時間, Tarinai Jikan) is a Japanese manga written and illustrated by Shoko Hidaka (日高 ショーコ, Hidaka Shōko). It is licensed in North America by Digital Manga Publishing, which released the manga through its imprint, Juné, on July 25, 2007. It is licensed in Taiwan by Sharp Point Press and in Germany by Carlsen Verlag.

== Reception ==
Holly Ellingwood of Active Anime praised the characterisation. Mania's Danielle Van Gorder describes the linework of the art as "assured," and she appreciated the "variety" in the anthology. Comics Village's Katherine Farmar regretted the brevity of the stories, saying that although the author creates a good atmosphere of "yearning," that the feeling could not build enough in the space of a short story.
