= The First Stage of Love =

Japanese manga

- Cover of The First Stage of Love as released by Core Magazine

関係はまだLv.1 (Kankei wa Mada Lv. 1)
- Genre: Yaoi
- Manga
- Written by: Kazuhiko Mishima
- Published by: Core Magazine
- English publisher: NA: Digital Manga Publishing
- Published: December 23, 2004
- Volumes: 1

The First Stage of Love (Japanese: 関係はまだ, Hepburn: Kankei wa Mada) is a yaoi manga written and illustrated by Kazuhiko Mishima. The manga was released by Core Magazine on December 23, 2004, in Japan. It is licensed in English by Digital Manga Publishing, which released the manga 8 April 2008 under its Juné imprint.

== Reception ==
Briana Lawrence enjoyed that the characters' insecurities were "normal", especially enjoying the inclusion of an overweight character as a romantic protagonist, which she regards as unusual for the yaoi genre. Holly Ellingwood described the manga as "cute", enjoying the "gentle comedy".
