= Prince Charming (manga) =

Japanese manga series

プリンスチャーミング (Purinsuchāmingu)
- Genre: Yaoi
- Manga
- Written by: Akemi Takaido
- Published by: Houbunsha
- English publisher: NA: Digital Manga Publishing
- Published: 27 December 2004

Prince Charming (プリンスチャーミング, Purinsuchāmingu) is a Japanese manga written and illustrated by Akemi Takaido. It is licensed in North America by Digital Manga Publishing, which released the first volume through its imprint June, on 24 October 2007, the second volume on 15 January 2008, and the last volume on 22 April 2008.

== Reception ==
Leroy Douresseaux recommends the first volume to "readers who enjoy fiction set in the modern hook-up culture". Holly Ellingwood enjoyed Yuasa's "unkempt" character design. Briana Lawrence enjoyed the complexities of the story, despite not enjoying the art and not looking forward to a story featuring a student/teacher relationship. Writing about the second volume, she said "I cannot stress enough how great these characters are. Each one is believable and I'm in love with every single one of them. The plot is so... real!" For Leroy Douresseaux, the second volume "never really comes together", feeling more like "a collection of scenes" than a sustained narrative. Holly Ellingwood felt the second volume was "a great change of pace from the regular yaoi manga with its unexpected turns and unique comedic take on the situation of these four men". Briana Lawrence found some aspects of the ending disappointing, especially characters conveniently disappearing. Leroy Douressaux feels the final volume "has more talking than it does coupling" and compares it to Friends. Rachel Bentham felt Asahina was entertaining in the final volume because of his "backwards way of saying 'I love you'".
