= Voice or Noise =

Japanese manga series

- Cover of the first volume of Voice or Noise

ボイス・オア・ノイズ (Boisu oa Noizu)
- Genre: Romance, Yaoi
- Manga
- Written by: Yamimaru Enjin
- Published by: Tokuma Shoten
- English publisher: NA: Blu Manga
- Imprint: Chara Comics
- Magazine: Chara
- Original run: 2003 – 2015
- Volumes: 6

Voice or Noise (Japanese: ボイス・オア・ノイズ, Hepburn: Boisu oa Noizu) is a yaoi manga series by Yamimaru Enjin, author of the one-shot manga The Way To Heaven and illustrator of the novel Eat or Be Eaten. It was serialized in the magazine Chara by Tokuma Shoten from 2003 to 2015 and collected into six volumes. The story focuses on the relationship between a junior high school student, Shinichiro, and a college professor, Narusawa, both of whom have the ability to speak to animals.

For a time, Blu Manga held the licensing rights to publish the series in North America. A total of three volumes were released in English before the company shut down its activity.

== Characters ==
- Shinichiro: a junior high school student who seeks the aid of Narusawa for his ill dog, Flappy. Shinichiro was told by the vet he went to see that Narusawa can speak to animals. Narusawa denies this, but Shinichiro discovers later that he was lying. Shinichiro begins to visit Narusawa at his home, hoping to learn to talk to animals. Both he and Narusawa are able to converse with Narusawa's cat, Acht.
- Narusawa: a moody, introverted college math professor. He has the ability to understand and communicate with animals. He prefers to avoid the company of all living things, but when Shinichiro starts visiting his house, he slowly accepts him and starts to want him to visit. His personality stems from an incident in his childhood. Before the funeral of one of his classmates, he saw a couple of teachers shove a dog that had been hit by a car to the side of the road and cover it up. The uncaring way in which this was done hardened his heart.
- Acht: a black cat that lives with Narusawa. He converses with it occasionally. Acht speaks Japanese, German, and English, but not to other cats. He is bored easily if he has no one to talk to.

== Media ==
=== Manga ===
Voice or Noise was serialized in Japan in the magazine Chara from 2003 to April 22, 2015, and published in volume format by Tokuma Shoten under the Chara Comics imprint in six volumes. Blu Manga originally licensed the series for English-language publication in North America and released a total of three volumes. With Tokyopop, the company in charge of distributing Blu label's releases, ceasing its activity in North America in 2011, however, the English-language publication of the series remained incomplete.

No.	Original release date	Original ISBN	English release date	English ISBN
1	June 25, 2003	4-19-960220-8	November 13, 2007	978-1427804341
2	November 25, 2004	4-19-960269-0	March 4, 2008	978-1427804358
3	June 25, 2008	978-4-19-960380-8	August 3, 2010	978-1427818058
4	June 25, 2011	978-4-19-960481-2	—	—
5	October 24, 2015	978-4-19-960654-0	—	—
6	December 25, 2015	978-4-19-960659-5	—	—
