= Pathos (manga) =

Japanese manga

- Genre: Supernatural, Yaoi
- Manga
- Written by: Mika Sadahiro
- Published by: Oakla Publishing
- English publisher: NA: Digital Manga Publishing
- Published: July 12, 2004
- Volumes: 2

Pathos is a Japanese manga written and illustrated by Mika Sadahiro. It is licensed in North America by Digital Manga Publishing, which released the first volume on July 22, 2008, and the second on September 23, 2008.

== Reception ==
Leroy Douresseaux says of Pathos that "Rarely are vampires as sexy as they are in Pathos", and favourably compares it to Interview with the Vampire, later describing the story as feeling "timeless", and praising Sadahiro's characterisations. Patricia Beard felt the character designs did not mesh well together, feeling as if they'd been taken from many different subgenres, and disliked the "tawdry and coarse" cover art. Beard felt that the vampire lore in the story was "unusual", and praised Sadahiro's inventiveness and attention to individuality in a particular sex scene. Beard enjoyed the characterisation of Ace in the second volume, but criticised the English adaptation of the second volume as having several jarring moments.
