= Dog × Cat =

Japanese manga series

わんことにゃんこ (Wanko to Nyanko)
- Genre: Yaoi
- Manga
- Written by: Yoshimi Amasaki
- Published by: Core Magazine
- English publisher: NA: 801 Media
- Magazine: Drap
- Original run: 2007 – 2010
- Volumes: 4

Dog × Cat (Japanese: わんことにゃんこ, Hepburn: Wanko to Nyanko; lit. "Doggy and Kitty") is a Japanese manga written and illustrated by Yoshimi Amasaki. It is licensed in North America by 801 Media which released the manga in November 2009.

== Plot ==
It tells the story of two very different high school boys, Atsu and Junya. Atsu, who is often compared to a dog, is friendly, loyal, and a bit naive. Junya, on the other hand, is more like a cat—aloof, independent, and somewhat cold. Despite their contrasting personalities, the two boys are drawn to each other, leading to a developing romantic relationship. The manga explores their growing bond, the challenges they face in understanding each other's differences, and the tender moments that bring them closer together.

== Reception ==
Rachel Bentham, writing for Active Anime, enjoyed the artist's conceit of having the characters suddenly "sport cat ears or dog tails" respectively for comedic effect. Jennifer Dunbar, writing for Pop Culture Shock, was impressed by the inclusion of a condom and by one character offering to be versatile because the other is uncertain about having sex with a man, but was disappointed at the too-easy forgiveness of the rape at the end of the manga. Julie Rosato, writing for Mania, felt that most of the manga was "pure, shiny, A-grade fun", but felt that Junya's uncertainty and his rape of Atsu was out of place.
