= Black Sun (manga) =

Japanese manga by Uki Ogasawara

- Cover of the first Japanese volume

Black Sun 奴隷王 (Black Sun Dorei Ou)
- Genre: Yaoi
- Manga
- Written by: Uki Ogasawara
- Published by: Taiyoh Tosho
- English publisher: NA: Digital Manga Publishing
- Original run: 2007 – 2011
- Volumes: 2

Black Sun (Japanese: Black Sun 奴隷王, Hepburn: Black Sun Dorei Ou; lit. "Black Sun Slave King") is a Japanese manga written and illustrated by Uki Ogasawara. It is licensed in North America by Digital Manga Publishing, which released the manga on 4 November 2008.

== Reception ==
Leroy Douresseaux, writing for Comic Book Bin, felt that the characters were underdeveloped, and that despite the characters' "equally masculine" depiction, that Black Sun was a good example of yaoi using the rape fantasy device, finding that the sex scenes were so plentiful that they became "tedious". Danielle Van Gorder, writing for Mania Entertainment, felt that the writing was weak and that the romance between the characters amounted to Stockholm syndrome, but that the series' primary draw was its many "graphic" sex scenes and " gorgeous art".

Rachel Bentham, writing for Active Anime, enjoyed the writing, comparing it to "bodice ripper" romance novels with points of humour and enjoyed the interesting Crusades setting. Casey Brienza, writing for Anime News Network, compared the author to Ayano Yamane, another manga artist known for her humour, historical fantasy themes and good sex scenes. Brienza notes that the story ends on a cliffhanger, and that DMP does not acknowledge that it is part of an ongoing series in Japan. She found that the characters were well written and not true to seme and uke stereotypes, and praised the narrative device of telling part of the tale from the perspective of a pet panther. Brienza described the art as "gorgeous", feeling that the art alone could turn people on to Black Sun. Despite the high production quality from Digital Manga Publishing, Brienza felt that the recommended retail price would reduce the likelihood that people would buy it.
