= Romantic Illusions =

Japanese manga

脳内恋愛のススメ (Nōnai Renai no Susume)
- Genre: Yaoi
- Manga
- Written by: Reiichi Hiiro
- Published by: Tokuma Shoten
- English publisher: NA: Digital Manga Publishing
- Published: June 25, 2006

Romantic Illusions (脳内恋愛のススメ, Nōnai Renai no Susume) is a Japanese manga written and illustrated by Reiichi Hiiro. It is licensed in North America by Digital Manga Publishing, which released the manga on 9 September 2008.

== Reception ==
Briana Lawrence felt that although the concept was interesting, that the plot was full of coincidences and that the ending was too pat to be satisfying. Leroy Dessaroux felt that the themes of "mental illness and perversion" somehow don't overwhelm the comedy of the work, but rather, add to the "spiciness". Michelle Smith felt the premise was "unique", but that the manga was "mildly diverting", at best.
