= Fake Fur (manga) =

Japanese manga

フェイクファー (Feiku Fā)
- Genre: School life, Yaoi
- Manga
- Written by: Satomi Yamagata
- Published by: Houbunsha
- English publisher: NA: Digital Manga Publishing
- Published: October 27, 2001
- Volumes: 1
- Manga

Manic Love
- Written by: Satomi Yamagata
- Published by: Houbunsha
- English publisher: NA: Digital Manga Publishing
- Published: December 27, 2005
- Volumes: 1

Fake Fur (Japanese: フェイクファー, Hepburn: Feiku Fā) is a manga by Satomi Yamagata. It is licensed in English by Digital Manga Publishing, which published Fake Fur in April 2007. A prequel volume, Manic Love (感情回路, Kanjō Kairo), was published by DMP in September 2007.

== Plot ==
The first story in Fake Fur concerns a schoolboy, Yamashita who learns he is gay, and falls in love with his straight classmate Kubo, who moves away. Although Yamashita has sex with an older man, Reni, and later enters a relationship with his college roommate Fukuzawa, Yamashita finds he cannot fall in love, until he realizes Fukuzawa might leave him. The second story in Fake Fur concerns a runaway, Maki, who has an encounter with Reni.

The prequel, Manic Love, explores Maki's background and concerns a love triangle between him, his math teacher, and a fellow teacher.

== Reception ==
Danielle Van Gorder, writing for Mania Entertainment, described the art of Fake Fur as "sketchy", but felt that this was not due to lack of skill on Yamagata's part and enhanced the emotional qualities of the work. Van Gorder felt the themes of "emotional connection in a lonely world and not knowing what you have until it's gone" came through Fake Fur extremely well. Ginger Mayerson, writing for Sequential Tart, felt Fake Fur was "sad, happy, sexy, moody, and all of it beautifully drawn and told in a refreshingly clear-eyed style". Library Journal says that although Fake Fur is "light on plot and character and heavy on explicit sex, it is elevated by elegant, uncluttered artwork."

Danielle Van Gorder, writing for Mania Entertainment, described the art of Manic Love as "sketchy" and "sparse", cautioning that it will not be to all readers' tastes. Van Gorder felt that it was not needed to have read Fake Fur to enjoy Manic Love, and felt that the "similar mature, moody feel" to Manic Love would make it not appeal to all readers, but would be more likely to appeal to older readers than younger readers. Ginger Mayerson, writing for Sequential Tart, found Manic Love confronting in that Maki is rejected by his teacher and in Fake Fur becomes involved with the "jerk" Reni. Mayerson noted a hint that one of Maki's classmates has interest in Maki, and Mayerson created an "imaginary manga" where Maki and this classmate live happily ever after. Mayerson describes both Fake Fur and Manic Love as "painful and beautiful stories".
