= Happiness Recommended =

Japanese manga

幸福のスゝメ (Koufukuno Susume)
- Genre: Yaoi
- Manga
- Written by: Souya Himawari
- Published by: Houbunsha
- English publisher: NA: Digital Manga Publishing
- Published: March 28, 2003
- Volumes: 1

Happiness Recommended (幸福のスゝメ, Koufukuno Susume) is a one-shot Japanese manga written and illustrated by Souya Himawari. It is licensed in North America by Digital Manga Publishing, which released the manga through its imprint, Juné, on February 11, 2009. Houbunsha released the manga on March 28, 2003.

== Reception ==
Mania.com's Briana Lawrence criticises the manga's ending saying, "the ending for "Happiness Recommended" is decent, but the ending for "Another Rainy Day" felt incomplete". Active Anime's Rachel Bentham commends the manga for its "fun, appealing art style". Comic Book Bin's Leroy Douresseaux comments that "the combative gay romance between Yakiharu and Makoto is funny and gentle – more romantic (shounen-ai manga) than explicit (yaoi manga)".
