= Captain Ken =

Japanese manga series

- Cover of "Captain Ken" volume 1 from the Osamu Tezuka Manga Complete Works edition.

キャプテン・ケン (Kyaputen Ken)
- Genre: Space Western
- Manga
- Written by: Osamu Tezuka
- Published by: Shogakukan
- English publisher: NA: Digital Manga Publishing
- Magazine: Weekly Shōnen Sunday
- Original run: December 18, 1960 – August 20, 1961
- Volumes: 2

Captain Ken (Japanese: キャプテン・ケン, Hepburn: Kyaputen Ken) is a manga series by Osamu Tezuka that was serialized in Shogakukan's Weekly Shōnen Sunday from December 18, 1960, to August 20, 1961. The published chapters were collected in two volumes.

== Plot ==
The series take place in the future, after mankind migrated to the planet Mars, home to the Martians. Before long, the humans begin persecuting the Martians, and the two species form a mutual hatred of each other.

The action takes place Heden City, a frontier town and home to the Hoshino family. One day, Ken Minakami comes from Earth to visit her relatives, the Hoshino family. Not long after she arrives, a mysterious gunman calling himself "Captain Ken" appears in Heden City. Captain Ken is a human that fights on the side of the Martians, protecting them from those who wish to exploit them for their own gain.

Mamoru Hoshino, the eldest son of the Hoshino family, begins to suspect that Ken Minakami may be the mysterious gunslinger, Captain Ken.

== Characters ==
- Captain Ken – a strange space cowboy who fights for the Martians. While he does not wear a mask, his real identity is a secret.
- Arrow – Captain Ken's horse.
- Ken Minakami – a relative of the Hoshino family who has come to Mars from Earth. Mamoru Hoshino suspects that she might be the true identity of Captain Ken.
- Mamoru Hoshino – the eldest son of the Hoshino family who works on his family's farm. He is highly suspicious that Ken Minakami may actually be Captain Ken.
- Governor Debun
- Lamp
- Double
- Sheriff Notaarin – Sheriff of Heden City.
- Pavilion – a Martian native.
- Napoleon
