= Picnic (manga) =

2004 anthology by Yugi Yamada

ピクニック (Pikunikku)
- Genre: Yaoi
- Manga
- Written by: Yugi Yamada
- Published by: Houbunsha
- English publisher: NA: Digital Manga Publishing
- Published: August 30, 2004

Picnic (ピクニック, Pikunikku) is a Japanese manga anthology written and illustrated by Yugi Yamada. It is licensed in North America by Digital Manga Publishing, which released the manga through its June imprint, on 27 June 2007.

== Reception ==
Erin Finnegan felt the anthology format worked well with the explicit themes. Patricia Beard felt the volume was lifted by the Oikawa/Hashimoto stories, finding them "funny and unconventional". Holly Ellingwood felt the stories had a tone of "nostalgic sentimentality". Hannah Santiago, writing for the appendix to Manga: The Complete Guide, felt the art was "dated", and that the stories were not long enough. Santiago felt that two of the stories had disturbing themes. Leroy Douresseaux felt the writing was "cold and sometimes stiff", but noted that fans would enjoy the many sex scenes in the manga.
