= Cute Beast =

Japanese manga anthology

かわいいビースト (Kawaii Beast)
- Genre: Yaoi
- Manga
- Written by: Amayo Tsuge
- Published by: Houbunsha
- English publisher: NA: Digital Manga Publishing
- Published: October 30, 2006

Cute Beast (かわいいビースト, Kawaii Beast) is a Japanese manga anthology written and illustrated by Amayo Tsuge. It is licensed in North America by Digital Manga Publishing, which released the manga through its Juné imprint, on December 12, 2007.

== Reception ==
Leroy Douresseaux, writing for Comic Book Bin, felt the manga is "gentle, playful, and funny". Julie Rosato, writing for Mania, felt Tsuge's artistic strength was in drawing "cute faces", despite there being "only two faces in this artist's repertoire". Rosato summed it up as being at best "no more than a fluff read". Holly Ellingwood, writing for Active Anime, describes the anthology as "cute and mostly comedic stories that see all types of fun and light hearted yaoi romances everywhere".
