= Coffin of Cerebrum =

Japanese hentai manga by Tokihara Masato

- The cover of the Japanese release of the manga

セレブラムの柩 ―背徳の半女神― (Sereburamu no Hitsugi -Haitoku no Han Megami-)
- Genre: Dark fantasy, hentai
- Manga
- Written by: Tokihara Masato
- Published by: Kill Time Communication
- English publisher: US: Digital Manga
- Magazine: Comic Unreal
- Published: 2010
- Volumes: 1

Coffin of Cerebrum (セレブラムの柩 ―背徳の半女神―, Sereburamu no Hitsugi -Haitoku no Han Megami-) is a Japanese hentai manga written and illustrated by Tokihara Masato. It was published in English by Digital Manga, who chose to remove a chapter for legal reasons.

== Release ==
The series was published by Tokihara Masato in Kill Time Communication's Comic Unreal magazine in 2010. Digital Manga announced their license to the book on 8 February 2013, with plans to publish it in North America under their Project-H imprint in June 2014. In May 2014 they announced that one chapter would be removed from the print edition due to violent content. They later stated that the chapter in question, "Game 4", would also be excluded from the digital edition, stating that the removal took place "mainly [because of] the shota aspect and the violence towards children." After consulting with their legal expert, they were forced to contact the Japanese publisher and gain permission to remove the chapter for the volume's English release.

No.	Original release date	Original ISBN	English release date	English ISBN
01	26 February 2010	978-4-86032-881-8	28 May 2014	9781624591709
"Game 1" (セレブラムの柩 -game1-, Sereburamu no Hitsugi – Game 1 -); "Game 2" (セレブラムの柩 -game2-, Sereburamu no Hitsugi – Game 2 -); "Game 2.5" (セレブラムの柩 -game2.5-, Sereburamu no Hitsugi – Game 2.5 -); "Game 3" (セレブラムの柩 -game3-, Sereburamu no Hitsugi – Game 3 -); "Game 4" (セレブラムの柩 -game4-, Sereburamu no Hitsugi – Game 4 -); "Game 5" (セレブラムの柩 -game5-, Sereburamu no Hitsugi – Game 5 -); "Last Game" (セレブラムの柩 -last game-, Sereburamu no Hitsugi – Game 5 -); "Moonlight Flower"; "Ancient Queen" (エンシェントクィーン, Enshento Kuīn)

== Reception ==
Reviewing Coffin of Cerebrum for The Fandom Post, Matthew Alexander gave the story and art a grade of A−. He called the story "very appealing", citing the fact that the book represented the underrepresented category of "fantasy genre hentai stories". He was also positive toward the art, calling it "perfect for a hentai story with a fantasy theme", and noting that the author "does a terrific job with anatomy and proportions". He was critical, however, of the presence of censorship and of the quality of the English translation, writing that the editing was "on the poor side with lots of misspelled text and a few words missing letters."
