= Live For Love (manga) =

Japanese manga

- Genre: Yaoi
- Manga
- Written by: Jun Mayama
- Published by: Core Magazine
- English publisher: NA: Digital Manga Publishing
- Published: November 2, 2006

Live For Love (愛に生きたいだけなのさ～BL探偵～, Ai ni Ikitai Dake na no sa ~BL Tantei~) is a Japanese manga written and illustrated by Jun Mayama. It is licensed in North America by Digital Manga Publishing, which released the manga on February 25, 2009.

== Reception ==
Leroy Douresseaux, writing for Comic Book Bin, felt that the strong settings of the manga were quite believable, both the small business of the detective-agency-cum-cat-parlour and Yoshiyuki's family home. Melinda Beasi, writing for PopCultureShock, was disappointed at Yasuie raping Yoshiyuki as being a mechanism to force Yoshiyuki's return to his family, and felt that the same situation could have been achieved another way that would be less discomfiting for people who do not like non-consensual sex in yaoi. Beasi felt that otherwise the relationship between the characters was "well-developed" and "frankly adorable". ActiveAnime enjoyed the mixing of comedy and soap operatic drama, feeling Live For Love would appeal to fans of Fake and Yellow.
