= Little Cry Baby =

Japanese manga

泣き虫なリトル (Nakimushi na Little)
- Genre: Yaoi
- Manga
- Written by: Keiko Kinoshita
- Published by: Taiyo Tosho
- English publisher: NA: Digital Manga Publishing
- Published: February 2, 2004

Little Cry Baby (泣き虫なリトル, Nakimushi na Little) is a Japanese manga anthology written and illustrated by Keiko Kinoshita. It is licensed in North America by Digital Manga Publishing, which released the manga on 27 June 2007.

== Reception ==
Leroy Douresseaux, writing for Comic Book Bin, described the manga as "non-graphic", noting the stories were tied together by featuring boys and young men who "cry at the simplest things". He preferred the short story "Raika". Patricia Beard, writing for Mania Entertainment, found the "whispy, linear style" of Kinoshita's artwork made her feel as if she was witnessing the emotions changing, not just as still pictures on a page, and enjoyed the writing of the short stories. Katherine Farmar, writing for Comics Village, found the BL stories in the anthology had a "very effective atmosphere of wistful yearning", but found "Raika" "creepy". Farmar also noted the "sketchiness" of the artwork, feeling this lent the characters an air of being "as reluctant to stake out a permanent place on the page as to make a definite declaration of love."
