= Double Trouble (manga) =

Japanese manga

トラブル・ダブルフェイス (Trouble Double Face)
- Genre: Yaoi
- Manga
- Written by: Takashi Kanzaki
- Published by: Tokuma Shoten
- English publisher: NA: Digital Manga Publishing
- Published: January 2002

Double Trouble (トラブル・ダブルフェイス, Trouble Double Face) is a Japanese manga written and illustrated by Takashi Kanzaki. It is licensed in North America by Digital Manga Publishing which released the manga on January 29, 2009.

== Reception ==
Michelle Smith, writing for PopCultureShock, found the use of hypnosis to be "disturbing", and was "bugged" by the ending, which leaves Naruki with a permanently split personality. Rachel Bentham, writing for Active Anime, felt it was an "interesting mix of super naughty meeting super funny". Although Leroy Douressaux described Double Trouble as "a comedy about the pure, naked lust of young men", he also noted the themes, saying "If incest, manipulation, and love triangles can be spun into a quality romantic drama, Takashi Kanzaki has already proved she can do it."
