= I'm Not Your Steppin' Stone: Shameless =

Japanese manga

- Cover of the Japanese volume

生意気。 (Namaiki.)
- Genre: Yaoi
- Manga
- Written by: Shiuko Kano
- Published by: Magazine Magazine
- English publisher: NA: Digital Manga Publishing
- Published: December 2001
- Volumes: 1
- Manga

Maybe I'm Your Steppin' Stone: Loveliness
- Written by: Shiuko Kano
- Published by: Magazine Magazine
- English publisher: NA: Digital Manga Publishing
- Published: October 30, 2004
- Volumes: 1

I'm Not Your Steppin' Stone: Shameless, known in Japan as Namaiki. (生意気。; lit. 'Cheeky.') is a manga written and illustrated by Shiuko Kano. It is licensed in English by Digital Manga Publishing, which published I'm Not Your Steppin' Stone: Shameless in November 2007. It involves a construction worker without a high school diploma who falls in unrequited love with a woman who likes intellectuals. He approaches her brother for tutoring, but the brother agrees on the condition that the construction worker pay him in sexual favours. A sequel volume, Maybe I'm Your Steppin' Stone: Loveliness, known in Japan as Kawaige. (可愛気。; lit. "I Feel Kawai."), was published by DMP in February 2008.

== Reception ==
Rachel Bentham, writing for Active Anime, described I'm Not Your Steppin' Stone as being "some of the raciest, raunchiest stuff I've seen in a yaoi". Bentham also commended the masculine character designs. Danielle Van Gorder found the relationship between Sakai and Ezumi to be "a lot of fun", even given that Van Gorder felt that the primary purpose of I'm Not Your Steppin' Stone was to titillate.

Leroy Douresseaux felt that the masculine character designs of Maybe I'm Your Steppin' Stone came right out of "gay porn", contrasting them with Kano's "unattractive, awkward looking women". He found the characters and story to be "actually quite engaging", although he noted that these came second in the author's priorities to showing sex scenes. Danielle Van Gorder felt that Maybe I'm Your Steppin' Stone would appeal to a variety of BL readers, as she felt it was "well written", with "gorgeous art" and had "interesting characters", as well as being "dead sexy", with sex scenes "a little more hardcore" than most yaoi manga released in English. Rachel Bentham, writing for Active Anime, described Maybe I'm Your Steppin' Stone as being "one of the more raw and explicit yaoi out there", praising Kano's skill at drawing "vulnerable expressions".
