= Under Grand Hotel =

Japanese manga series

- Cover of the first volume of Under Grand Hotel published by Sanwa

アンダーグラ~~ウ~~ンドホテル (Andāgura~~u~~ndo Hoteru)
- Manga
- Written by: Mika Sadahiro
- Published by: Sanwa Publishing, Futabasha
- English publisher: 801 Media
- Original run: April 25, 2003 – October 25, 2005
- Volumes: 3 (first edition), 2 (reprint)

Under Grand Hotel (Japanese: アンダーグラ~~ウ~~ンドホテル, Hepburn: Andāgura~~u~~ndo Hoteru) is a yaoi manga by Mika Sadahiro about two prisoners, Sen and Swordfish, who try to survive the notorious prison "Under Grand Hotel". It is published by 801 Media in English, although at one point, Tokyopop offered a license.

== Reception ==
Briana Lawrence was shocked by the manga, appreciating the brutality of the setting, highlighting that the rape scenes are not an unrealistic rape fantasy. She found that the series was extremely condensed and hard-hitting all the time. Melinda Beasi describes the manga as being intense, melodramatic and deeply unbelievable, and appreciates the masculine character designs. Sandra Scholes feels that it is gritty and dark.
