= Enchanter (manga) =

Japanese manga series

- Japanese manga cover of Kikō Majutsushi -enchanter- Vol.1 as published by Square Enix

機工魔術士-enchanter- (Kikō Majutsushi -Enchantā-)
- Manga
- Written by: Izumi Kawachi
- Published by: Square Enix
- English publisher: NA: Digital Manga
- Magazine: Monthly Gangan Wing
- Original run: October 2002 – August 2008
- Volumes: 19

Enchanter (Japanese: 機工魔術士-enchanter-, Hepburn: Kikō Majutsushi-Enchantā-) is a Japanese manga series written and illustrated by Izumi Kawachi. It was serialized in October 2002 in Square Enix's magazine Monthly Gangan Wing and later licensed in North America by Digital Manga. The manga was adapted into 2 drama CDs.

== Plot ==
The story revolves around "Enchanters" or Kikō majutsushi (machinist-magicians), people who can build enchanted items with the power gained from their contracted demon. The enchanted items can then carry special effects like "hardened", "water resistance", or "evil repelling".

The protagonist, Haruhiko Kanou, is a regular high school student with the gift of fixing and building mechanical and electrical appliances. His motivation comes from his secret love towards his next-door-neighbor and childhood friend, Yuka Fujikawa, who is a few years older and now teaches at Haruhiko's high school.

A powerful enchanter named Fulcanelli and his beloved contract demon Eukanaria roam the secretive world of magic and sorcery. Just before the start of the story, Fulcanelli dies, and Eukanaria wants to revive him in a new body using the stone that contains his soul. Although Fulcanelli has no wish to be revived, he does not want to hurt Eukanaria and therefore keeps silent.

Eukanaria finds Haruhiko, who has the perfect body for Fulcanelli. To Haruhiko's surprise, Eukanaria looks exactly like Yuka, and he himself looks exactly like Fulcanelli. Eukanaria tries to seduce him into giving her his soul so she can place Fulcanelli's soul into Haruhiko's body using four different procedures. Haruhiko has to sign a contract, die, have sex (there is a moment when the soul becomes unstable), or lose the will to live.

== Characters ==
Haruhiko Kanou (叶晴彦, Kanō Haruhiko)

A 17-year-old student, Haruhiko is the story's main protagonist; he is skilled with mechanical things and shows potential to become a great enchanter. Haruhiko is compatible with Fulcanelli's soul, and therefore is constantly pressured into giving up his body to Eukanaria, his main love interest. Eurkanaria is his homeroom roommate and friend, whom Haruhiko helps and constantly fantasies about. A running gag is that he is constantly called "impotent" or "spineless" for his lack of progress with her and when his collection of adult magazines is found. He has been training to fight under Yamamoto.

Yuka Fujikawa (藤川優香, Yūka Fujikawa)

Yuka is a teacher at Haruhiko's school and is his childhood friend. She is six years older than he is and is a gentle person, placing the students' welfare above her own. She is constantly the target of demon attacks since she is the perfect type of target for them. She looks like Eukanaria and her MD player holds a demon warding stone placed by Fulcanelli, hinting at some kind of connection between them. She has a demon as a pet named Neraga to watch over her—ironically, it is the first demon to attack her in search of Fulcanelli's power.

Eukanaria (ユウカナリア, Yūkanaria)

Eukanaria is a demon who resembles Yuka (down to her measurements). She loved Fulcanelli and wishes to use Haruhiko's body to revive Fulcanelli's soul, and is willing to sleep with him to do so. She constantly tries to seduce Haruhiko by acting like Yuka, but also shows concern for him. Unlike most demons, she is used to the human world—she's given up so much of her power that she is more human than demon. Other characters state that she was vicious in the past, but Fulcanelli changed her. She hates how she was in the past, and states that if Fulcanelli can't be resurrected, she would lose all reason for living. She grows to love Haruhiko, but refuses to confess her love for him, as she also still loves Fulcanelli.

Fulcanelli (フルカネルリ, Furukaneruri)

Fulcanelli is a powerful enchanter turned demon. He was admired by demons and enchanters for his power. His soul is inside a "demonstone" and hasn't been able to manifest since he gave Haruhiko his extra power. He is the brother of Paracelsus, and has partial feelings for Eukanaria.

Paracelsus (パラケルスス, Parakerususu)

Paracelsus is an enchanter, physician, and pervert who can take the form of a young man, but whose true body is a skeleton. He constantly gives Haruhiko advice and help. He seems to like Eukanaria, and usually tries to touch her, which results in him getting hit. He also tries to help Haruhiko with Yuka, and even suggests that he hurry up and sleep with her as a way to prevent her from being targeted by demons. Surprisingly, he is a strong fighter—not even Fulcanelli was able to beat him. He has an assistant named Ai. He was modeled after real-world alchemist and physician Paracelsus.

Ai (アイ, Ai)

Ai is a demon child who works under Paracelsus. She is good at making clothing and is combat capable. She never talks, but tends to appear out of nowhere.

Ranvoa (Lavoix) (ラヴォワ, Ravowa)

Ranvoa is a blue-haired demon who has history with Eukanaria. She knows about Eukanaria's past, and it is inferred that she was once in love with Fulcanelli. She has an enchanter named Adolf, whom she loves. She is ignorant towards the human realm due to little interaction with it, and as such does not understand why Haruhiko will not sleep with Eukanaria, despite sharing the same bed. She even suggests that Haruhiko kill Eukanaria to avoid giving up his body. Initially, she appears to want to return to her own world—even if it means stealing Fulcanelli's power from Haruhiko—but expresses visible frustration whenever Adolf mentions her returning without him; she eventually has an outburst at Adolf's overall lack of self-confidence and assertiveness to demand that they stay together, even if it means living in the human world. With Haruhiko's help, she ultimately decides to stay with Adolf.

Adolf (アドルフ, Adorufu)

Adolf is an enchanter who serves under Ranvoa. He is flustered by women like Eukanaria, but loves Ranvoa. He reluctantly drains Eukanaria's power to then attempt to steal Haruhiko/Fulcanelli's own power, claiming that it didn't matter as long as Ranvoa is happy and free to choose whatever she wants. He is very passive and doesn't like harming others, but lacks self-confidence. He and Haruhiko get along rather well due to their similar interests and abilities for gadgets.

Mana Kimura (木村まな, Kimura Mana)

Mana Kimura is a classmate of Haruhiko who has a crush on him. She is good at fixing bikes since her family runs a bicycle shop. She takes care of a crow she hits with her bike, which later turns out to be a demon named Navy. After being chased by Navy and defended by Haruhiko, she becomes an enchanter.

Navy (ネイヴィ, Neivi)

Navy is a demon who can change into a crow. He becomes Mana's demon contractor, and wants her to build him a method to fly since he lost the power to do so himself. He wields an axe and chain in battle. He is somewhat of a masochist, as he loves it when Mana scolds and hits him, and has expressed his desire to be "more" with her. He was defeated in battle by Haruhiko and sealed in a device that Mana has, so in case he becomes troublesome, she can seal him back up.

Mercurio (メルクーリオ, Merukūrio)

At first, Mercurio appears to be a clumsy but cute engraver working for Yamamoto. However, two personalities actually exist inside her body: her cute and kind side being a demon, and her original and ruthless side being an enchanter. Her demon side is in love with Haruhiko, while her enchanter side tries to kill him to prevent him from repairing the unit holding the demon inside her body.

== Production ==
Enchanter received some attention before its official release in North America. In 2006, before the release date, author Izumi Kawachi was invited to Anime Expo in the US, where fans had obtained copies of the Japanese version to read and for her to sign. Kawachi expressed surprise that, in contrary to Enchanter's popularity among males in Japan, the North American fan community had more females. Additionally, she noted that Haruhiko was the most popular character in Japan, whereas Paracelsus (the "skeleton man") was in North America. Kawachi remarked that she was a little confused that the humor in the plot is seen differently by Americans.

According to Kawachi, she often has young boys belittled as "useless" and "no good" due to her desire to be treated in such a way by a domineering, cute, older woman. She mentioned Takeshi Obata, the artist of Death Note and Hikaru no Go, as "one of the artists that influenced" her. Characters Fulcanelli and Haruhiko were modeled off of Japanese actor Haruhiko Kato. In Kawachi's words, she was influenced by "a music video where the singer played two very different characters, with different personalities... that gave me the idea for the dualities of Eukanaria and Yuka, and Fulcanelli and Haruhiko in Enchanter."

== Media ==
=== Manga ===
Enchanter was written and illustrated by Izumi Kawachi. Square Enix released the first tankōbon of the manga on January 27, 2003. Nineteen tankōbon volumes were released in Japan, with the last released on March 27, 2009. The manga was licensed in North America by Digital Manga Publishing, who released the first tankōbon volume on July 1, 2006. Ten tankōbon volumes were released in North America, with the last released on February 25, 2009. The first ten volumes of Enchanter were published in English by Digital Manga Publishing from July 4, 2006, to March 19, 2009, before the series was dropped.

=== Drama CDs ===
The manga was adapted into two drama CDs. The first CD, named Kikou Majutsushi - Enchanter Part.1, was released on November 26, 2004, covering the first eleven chapters of the manga. The second CD, named Kikou Majutsushi - Enchanter Part.2, was released on January 28, 2005, covering chapters twelve to seventeen of the manga. Both CDs had Masumi Asano, Yumi Toma, Koji Tsujitani, Shuichi Ikeda, Ryotaro Okiayu, Yumi Kakazu, Takehito Koyasu, and Kyoko Hikami as voice actors for the characters.

== Reception ==
Active Anime's Holly Ellingwood commended the manga as "one of the most energetic and comedic manga series I've come across".

A reviewer for Pop Culture Shock commended the characterization for Eukanaria, saying, "[she] could have been depicted as a mere sexpot, [but] is quite possibly the most complicated character in the series. True, she's frequently crass, but shows a surprisingly vulnerable side in volumes five through eight."

Mania.com's Matthew Alexander commended the manga's artwork saying, "the characters proportions are well drawn and facial expressions are quite varied and descriptive. Not surprisingly the backgrounds are fairly sparse and a little stale when present, but monster design is fairly interesting and the girls are definitely cute, especially when the sexy nighties come out. Line work is clean and the shading is pretty good."

Comics Village's Lori Henderson criticized the manga for having "fan service on nearly every page". However, she commended Digital Manga Publishing's physical presentation of the book: "printed in the oversize format, and it comes with a glossy dust sleeve, just like the Japanese editions do".
