= Wild Butterfly =

Japanese Manga

- Wild Butterfly as published by Oakla Publishing

国境の蝶 (Kokkyō no Chō)
- Genre: Yaoi
- Manga
- Written by: Hiroki Kusumoto
- Published by: Oakla Publishing
- English publisher: NA: Digital Manga Publishing
- Published: January 12, 2007
- Volumes: 1

Wild Butterfly (国境の蝶, Kokkyō no Chō) is a one-shot Japanese manga written and illustrated by Hiroki Kusumoto. Oakla Publishing released the manga on January 12, 2007. It is licensed in North America by Digital Manga Publishing, which released the manga through its imprint, Juné, on August 12, 2008.

== Reception ==
Active Anime's Holly Ellingwood commends on the manga for its "eclectic set of stories [to] grace a yaoi anthology". She also comments on the individual stories, saying, "the art style varies with the needs of each story. All the character designs differ (with the odd exception) and offer different worlds, eras and individuals to ignite the imagination. The designs are detailed and charismatic. Most of the stories have an interesting twist at the end that affects one's entire perception of the characters." Mania.com's Danielle van Gorder commends the manga's art saying, "The art here is stunning and accomplished, showing off the full range of Kusumoto's techniques. While the majority of the book showcases her lush, detailed style, one story in particular uses a simpler, starker style that relies heavily on large areas of flat blacks and negative space. The character designs are extremely varied and distinct. Her backgrounds, when used, have an incredible amount of detail, and she really excels at emotional expression." Comic Book Bin's Leroy Douresseaux commends the manga on its "supernatural elements that are creepy and occasionally quite scary, and the character drama sticks the landing (some Olympics humor), making this a volume of supernatural drama worth reading."
