= Hot Steamy Glasses =

Japanese manga by Tatsumi Kaiya

- English edition

レンズ越しの微熱 (Lens Goshi no Binetsu)
- Genre: Yaoi
- Manga
- Written by: Tatsumi Kaiya
- Published by: Taiyoh Tosho
- English publisher: NA: Digital Manga Publishing
- Published: October 16, 2006
- Volumes: 1

Hot Steamy Glasses (レンズ越しの微熱, Lens Goshi no Binetsu; lit. 'A Slight Fever Through Lenses') is a one-shot Japanese manga written and illustrated by Tatsumi Kaiya. It is licensed in North America by Digital Manga Publishing, which released the manga through its imprint, Juné, on April 8, 2008. Taiyoh Tosho released the manga on October 16, 2006.

== Reception ==
Shaenon Garrity criticises the manga's art saying, "The art is extremely crude, with stiff figures, ugly, wooden faces, and no backgrounds to speak of. Since there are only three characters, surely Tatsumi could have avoided making two of them look so confusingly similar". Briana Lawrence commends the manga's characters by saying, "All of the characters are unique and memorable in their own way. Takeo is so adorable and you can't help but root for the nerdy guy, at the same time, you can't help but feel kinda bad for Fumi as he goes on and on about not being gay and only wanting to be friends. Poor Shogo is stuck in the middle of his friend and his brother, getting more and more agitated with each turn of the page". Rachel Bentham comments that the manga is "a fun and light romance between and awkward guy and the harsh guy who he longs for and the two find themselves in an even more awkward situation!" Leroy Douresseaux compares the manga to a date movie, saying, "this tale of love has a couple experiencing all those awkward steps towards love, while a small cast of supporting characters eggs them".
