= Othello (Toui Hasumi manga) =

2007 manga

- Genre: Yaoi
- Manga
- Written by: Toui Hasumi
- Published by: Outou Shobou
- English publisher: NA: Digital Manga Publishing
- Published: October 10, 2002

Othello is a manga by Toui Hasumi. It was licensed in English by Digital Manga Publishing and published on 27 June 2007.

== Reception ==
Julie Rosato enjoyed the plotting of the title work in the anthology. Leroy Dessaroux enjoyed the "beautiful art featuring distinctive figure drawing" of the anthology.
