= I'll Be Your Slave =

Japanese manga

下僕になります (Geboku ni Narimasu)
- Genre: Yaoi
- Manga
- Written by: Miki Araya
- Published by: Ohto Shobo
- English publisher: NA: Digital Manga Publishing
- Published: June 10, 2002

I'll Be Your Slave (下僕になります, Geboku ni Narimasu) is a Japanese manga written and illustrated by Miki Araya. It is licensed in North America by Digital Manga Publishing, which released the manga on 29 January 2008.

== Reception ==
Leroy Douresseaux enjoyed the "comic" and "over the top" tone of the manga, describing it as a Hollywood-style romantic comedy. Briana Lawrence felt the art was overdramatic and that the story had too much going on at once, and that the humour was forced. Holly Ellingwood found the story "sexy and hilarious".
