= Candy (manga) =

Japanese manga

飴イロ蛮優引力 (Ameiro Banyū Inryoku)
- Genre: Yaoi
- Manga
- Written by: Satomi Sugita
- Published by: Oakla Publications
- English publisher: NA: Digital Manga Publishing
- Published: July 10, 2007
- Volumes: 1

Candy (飴イロ蛮優引力, Ameiro Banyū Inryoku) is a Japanese manga written and illustrated by Satomi Sugita. It is licensed in North America by Digital Manga Publishing which released the manga on 26 August 2008.

== Reception ==
Rachel Bentham, writing for Active Anime, felt Candy was "explicit without being too graphic and attractive for its tender-hearted characters and bon-vivant tone." Leroy Douressaux praised the varied character designs and the amount of humour in the work, which he felt was enough to lighten the mood. Danielle Van Gorder, writing for Mania Entertainment, appreciated the reactions of the "various townfolk" to Takara, saying that this helped create a sense of "depth" to the world.
