= Iris Zero =

Japanese manga series

- Cover of volume 1 featuring Koyuki Sasamori (left) and Toru Mizushima (right)

アイリス・ゼロ (Airisu Zero)
- Genre: Fantasy, Mystery, Romance, Drama
- Manga
- Written by: Piroshiki
- Illustrated by: Takana Hotaru
- Published by: Media Factory
- English publisher: Digital Manga Publishing
- Magazine: Monthly Comic Alive
- Original run: April 27, 2009 – present
- Volumes: 8

Iris Zero (Japanese: アイリス・ゼロ, Hepburn: Airisu Zero) is a Japanese manga written by Piroshiki and illustrated by Takana Hotaru. It follows the life of a boy who lives in a society where almost all people his age have supernatural powers called Iris in their eyes. As the only student in the school who has no Iris at all, he must make use of his intellect to help his friends see through the incidents that keep popping up.

== Plot ==
The manga takes place in a world where 99% of people are born with a unique ability called Iris. The main character, Toru Mizushima, is one of the 1% of people who does not have any Iris. In order to avoid bullying, Toru lives by the motto of "Minimal Exposure" – to live without standing out. However, the popular Koyuki Sasamori asks Toru out in order to receive his help, putting him in a spotlight and making his motto no longer viable.

== Characters ==
Toru Mizushima (水島 透, Mizushima Toru)
Voiced by: Tetsuya Kakihara (Drama CD)

The title character of the series, Toru is one of the few students at his school who does not have an Iris ability. He is usually ostracized by his peers and thus keeps a low profile in school.^{Ch. 1} After he helps Koyuki with her situation, he begins to befriend others as he helps resolve their problems. As a child, Toru pretended to have an Iris ability to identify the Irises of his peers, but when Asahi exposed his secret, the students shunned him.^{Ch. 3}

Koyuki Sasamori (佐々森 小雪, Sasamori Koyuki)
Voiced by: Rina Hidaka (Drama CD)

The heroine of the series, she is a kind and beautiful girl with the ability to discern whether someone can help her with a task by visualizing a circle or X above their head. Although she is esteemed as a school idol, she is the first to come to Toru and openly ask him out, raising suspicions and jealousy among her classmates, but actually, she wants his help to find a qualified candidate for the next student council president. When Koyuki helps her, she and the council come to the realization that she herself is the most qualified. She thanks Toru by hanging out with him as a close friend, and dragging him against his will to deal with situations only he could handle.^{Ch. 2} She is one of the few people who are not bothered that Toru is an Iris Zero, and admits she is a little jealous that he can see the world without filters. She is in love with Toru even though he tries not to reciprocate for fear of tarnishing her reputation of hanging out with an Iris Zero. However, Harumi observes that they both like each other the most.^{Ch. 13-20}

Asahi Yuki (結城 あさひ, Yuki Asahi)
Voiced by: Marina Inoue (Drama CD)

Yuki is Koyuki's friend who also used to be Toru's childhood friend until an incident where she reveals Toru's identity as an Iris Zero.^{Ch. 2} Her Iris ability allows her to see when someone tells a lie, as indicated by the appearance of a devil's pointed tail. She aspires to become a police officer, but when her guidance counselor lies and says she would be good for that, she gets offended and slaps her, putting herself at risk of expulsion.^{Ch. 2} After Toru saves her by explaining the situation, she is able to reconcile with the teacher and be more friendly towards Toru.^{Ch. 3-4} Piroshiki notes that she detects just the honesty of the person, and that a person can be sincere but wrong about something and not sprout a tail, whereas a deceitful person would immediately show the tail.^{Vol. 2 profile}

Hijiri Shinozuka (篠塚 聖, Shinozuka Hijiri)
Voiced by: Shunzou Miyasaka (Drama CD)

Hijiri is Toru's classmate with a laid-back attitude, and Toru's only friend before meeting Koyuki. His Iris ability allows him to see when someone is close to death, in the form of butterflies that converge near the person: a swarm of butterflies would indicate that the person will die very soon.^{Vol. 2 profile} He and Toru become friends after he helps him protect a girl important to him by preventing her death upon exposing the person who was after her life.^{Ch. 6}

Nanase Kuga (久賀 七瀬, Kuga Nanase)
Voiced by: Kanae Itō (Drama CD)

Kuga is Toru's classmate who is introduced as a shy girl that joins Toru's group at a field trip.^{Ch. 4} She is capable of evaluating other people's feelings using her Iris that allows her to see fairy-like wings on them whose colors vary according to their emotional state.^{Ch. 11-12} Because of her ability, she sometimes acts selfishly, where she steals Koyuki's Japanese clothing, and then serves as an antagonist in the Iris Hunter story-line where she psychologically manipulates her peers into not using their Irises and has them think they lost their abilities.^{Ch. 13-20}

Harumi Tokita (時田 晴海, Tokita Harumi)
Voiced by: Kenji Akabane (Drama CD)

Harumi is Toru's classmate and a calm and collected boy who wears glasses, who is Kuga's childhood friend and always looks after her.^{Vol. 4 profile}^{Ch. 11} His Iris manifests itself in the form of a halo above someone's head with an arrow pointing to whomever the person likes, with its length indicating how much they like that person.^{Vol. 4 profile} During the Iris Hunter storyline, he tries to protect Kuga by redirecting the blame to Toru. He reveals that some years ago, he and Kuga made a promise to not abuse their powers, but after Kuga relapses, he saves her from killing herself.^{Ch. 20} He has an animosity against Toru because he and Kuga had been helping their friend Houjou become more popular by having him run for Student Council President, only to be upended by Koyuki's sudden popularity.^{Ch. 23}

== Concept and development ==
In the afterword of volume 1, the author mentions a past idea where the protagonist could see the red strings of fate but could not fall in love. This changed to a protagonist who does not exhibit special powers among his peers who do. He does not want to stand out for fear of being bullied but acts a bit like a detective to help his friends.^{Vol. 1 afterword} In a bonus chapter, the characters comment about the lack of showing underwear in the series in comparison to other titles in the magazines.^{Vol. 1 bonus} In the afterword of volume 4, the author mentions that they originally planned to just make a series of one-shots with five of the main characters sketched out, but the editor wanted to stretch it out into a series. The editor also picked the title tentatively but it stuck in the final version.^{Vol. 4 afterword}

== Media ==
=== Manga ===
The manga started serialization on 2009 but in 2012 it went on hiatus for a year and a half while artist Hotaru Takana was hospitalized, only resuming in October 2013. The series was continued until 2019, when it entered indefinite hiatus due to Takana's health issues. In June 2014, Digital Manga Publishing announced that it had added Iris Zero to its releases.

No.	Original release date	Original ISBN	English release date	English ISBN
1	October 23, 2009	978-4-8401-2927-5	June 26, 2014	—
1. "Who Cannot See"; 2. "What Is Fate"; 3. "What Are Called Lies"; 4. "What Amounts To A School Trip"; Original Manga: Asahi, After; Original Manga: Fancy Iris Sentai Guro; Afterword
Toru Mizushima is a high school student who is an Iris Zero, that is, he lacks any special visual abilities in a world where 99% of his peers have them. To avoid being ostracized, he tries to keep a low profile, but he is asked out by school idol Koyuki Sasamori to help find the next student council president. She admires that Toru can see the world without an Iris ability. Toru then helps her by illustrating to the student council that she herself is the best candidate. When Koyuki's friend Asahi Yuki gets in trouble for slapping a teacher, Toru initially declines, because Yuki, whose ability is to see when someone lies, was the reason why he was ostracized for being an Iris Zero. After discussing with his friend Hijiri, Toru sets up a meeting with Yuki and the teacher, where it is revealed that the teacher also has an Iris ability, and had lied so as to not discourage her from pursuing her career choice. They are able to reconcile. On a school field trip, Toru meets Kuga, and helps Yuki and friends unravel the mystery behind the inn's locked toilet stall.
2	April 23, 2010	978-4-8401-3317-3	October 29, 2014	—
chapters 5-9
Hijiri shares with Koyuki about how he met Toru and how he was saved by him in his past, which involved some girls and his Iris ability to see when someone is close to death. Toru tries to meet with Koyuki who is regularly bothered by the other students in her duties as student council president. While he briefly criticizes her character flaws, he encourages her as a friend to stay as she is. At the cultural festival, Koyuki's Japanese costume goes missing. She overhears Toru and Hijiri talking where Toru figures out who did it, and confronts the culprit.
3	January 22, 2011	978-4-8401-3735-5	—	—
chapters 10-15
When Kuga receives a confession from schoolmate Houjou, Toru's friends see warning signs that the guy is not sincere. After Kuga's childhood friend Tokita refuses to help, Koyuki asks Houjou to stop deceiving Kuga. When Kuga invites Houjou over, she also questions Houjou's sincerity. This prompts him to beat up Toru for raising all those questions. Rumors arise about an "Iris Hunter", someone who can remove Iris powers. Kouyuki asks Tokita about his lack of involvement, at which Tokita responds he is siding with Kuga. When Toru returns to his class, he learns that the Iris Hunter rumors are now directed at him. Kuga asks Koyuki whether she can look at Toru to see he's qualified to love her. When Koyuki averts her gaze from Toru, he stops going to school, which worries her. After consulting with Hijiri, she rushes to Toru's home. In the bonus comics, Toru and the gang comment about the number of scenes that involve bathrooms. The group also discuss how Toru does not appear in photos.
4	July 23, 2011	978-4-8401-4013-3	—	—
chapters 16-20
At Toru's house, Koyuki pleads for Toru to come back and to accept her as a friend, which he does. Tokita reveals his back story about how he and Kuga kept a promise to not use her powers, and in turn, Tokita would protect her. They are surprised that the students are now looking at each other. Hijiri talks with Kuga about how she tricked everyone into not using their Irises, but that her plan had a flaw, which Toru and Koyuki were able to use to help the students. Despondent, Kuga retreats to the rooftop where she contemplates taking her life, but Tokita saves her at the last minute.
5	February 23, 2012	978-4-8401-4416-2	—	—
chapters 21-26
When Koyuki catches a cold, Toru and the gang visit her home to care for her. Tokita harbors some animosity towards Toru: he shares his back story about their friendship with Houjou and how Toru's antics at the student council derailed Houjou's run for president. After the rest of the group assemble, they shop and eventually settle on a set of phone straps for Koyuki's birthday present. Kuga asks Hijiri to be her boyfriend to introduce to her mother, who initially appears to be angry. Toru's friends ponder whether Yuki is aware that Koyuki has affections towards Toru.
6	March 22, 2014	978-4-04-066273-2	—	—
chapter 27-33
A new girl Rei Hoshimiya asks Toru to help find her lost pendant. Koyuki offers to help Toru but he refuses, which causes her to run off. Toru later finds Rei's friend Misaki Sakura, and reasons that she must have taken it. Sakura tells Toru that she gave it to someone else and that Toru is a key that would make Rei sad. While Sakura has entrusted the pendant to Koyuki, Rei confides with Toru that she was once an Iris Zero. As Toru tries to resolve the situation on his own, Hijiri and Kuga visit his home to find out why Koyuki has been sad. Sakura receives text messages from Kei revealing that she knows the truth about Kei's Iris ability being a fake, but the text is actually from Toru, who offers to make a deal to smooth things out so that Koyuki would not be burdened. However, Koyuki and the gang arrive and tell Toru to stop doing things on his own and to ask them for help.
7	November 21, 2016	978-4-0406-8574-8	—	—
8	January 23, 2019	978-4-0406-5549-9	—	—

=== Drama CD ===
A drama CD has been published by Edge Records first on February 23, 2012, and the second drama CD is released along with the limited special edition of volume 6 on March 22, 2014.

== Works cited ==
- "Ch." is shortened form for chapter and refers to a chapter number of the Iris Zero manga
