= Passionate Theory =

Japanese manga

両想いの確率論
- Genre: Yaoi
- Manga
- Written by: Ayumi Kano
- Published by: Tokuma Shoten
- English publisher: NA: Digital Manga Publishing
- Published: February 25, 2006

Passionate Theory (両想いの確率論, Ryōomoi no Kakuritsuron) is a manga by Ayumi Kano. It was licensed in English by Digital Manga Publishing and published on 23 September 2008. In Taiwan, it is published by Sharp Point Press.

== Reception ==
Rachel Bentham felt the love triangle was "unusual", and enjoyed the "evocative" art. Leroy Dessaroux felt the art gave the piece a Film Noir feel, although the dialogue made it feel like a "talky teen soap opera".
