= Loveholic (manga) =

Japanese manga series

- Genre: Yaoi
- Manga
- Written by: Toko Kawai
- Published by: Biblos
- English publisher: NA: Digital Manga Publishing
- Published: October 2001
- Volumes: 2

Loveholic (恋愛中毒, Ren'ai Chūdoku) is a Japanese manga written and illustrated by Toko Kawai. It is licensed in North America by Digital Manga Publishing, which released the first volume through its imprint, Juné, on 14 March 2007, and the second volume on 16 December 2008.

== Reception ==
Publishers Weekly finds the characters "three dimensional" in comparison to other yaoi protagonists, and appreciates that they have interests outside of each other, which makes Loveholic "seem more like a story, less like killing time until they get together". Julie Rosato, writing for Mania Entertainment, described the first volume as "a story full of subtleties", and appreciated the "flawed" characters who "grow" in the second volume. Leroy Douresseaux, writing for the Comic Book Bin, praised Kawai's "impressive range of facial expressions".
