= The Color of Love (manga) =

Japanese manga

コイノイロ (Koi no Iro)
- Genre: Yaoi
- Manga
- Written by: Kiyo Ueda
- Published by: Taiyo Tosho
- English publisher: NA: Digital Manga Publishing
- Published: November 1, 2006

The Color of Love (コイノイロ, Koi no Iro) is a Japanese manga written and illustrated by Kiyo Ueda. It is licensed in North America by Digital Manga Publishing, which released the manga on March 25, 2008.

== Reception ==
Leroy Douressaux found that it was "one of the most romantic yaoi manga titles" that he had ever read, and appreciated the "discreet" sex scenes, which he felt highlighted "new love over sudden lust", and enjoyed the "sentimentality" and classic Hollywood romance feel of the stories. Katherine Farmar found the anthology to be "consistently entertaining and fresh", and saying that each story "put a new spin" on cliches of the boys-love genre. Farmar noticed an improvement in the art style throughout the volume. Rachel Bentham, writing for Active Anime, described the stories as "fun" and "super sweet", but criticized the art as being "not quite the usual standard".
