= Dry Heat (manga) =

Manga by Yugi Yamada

我らの水はどこにある (Warera no Mizu wa Doko ni Aru)
- Genre: Yaoi
- Manga
- Written by: Yugi Yamada
- Published by: Houbunsha
- English publisher: NA: Digital Manga Publishing
- Magazine: Hanaoto
- Published: 2002

Dry Heat (Japanese: 我らの水はどこにある, Hepburn: Warera no Mizu wa Doko ni Aru) is a Japanese manga written and illustrated by Yugi Yamada. It was serialised in Hanaoto magazine and collected into a bound volume by Houbunsha in 2002. It is licensed in North America by Digital Manga Publishing, which released the manga through its June imprint, on 24 February 2010.

== Reception ==
Leroy Douresseaux, writing for Comic Book Bin, enjoyed the characterisation, saying "there is as much action going on in [the] character's heads as there is action on the page", and described the manga as an "engaging read".

Katherine Farmar, writing for Manga Village, noted Yamada's method of taking the BL cliche of the "childhood-crush-all-grown-up" and making it "less sentimental and more realistic", feeling it had "substance", and that the genres were "a delightful blend of romance, comedy, and very low-key thriller".
