= Blue Sky (manga) =

One-shot Japanese manga

- Cover.
- Genre: School, Yaoi
- Manga
- Written by: Yuko Kuwabara
- Published by: Libre Publishing
- English publisher: NA: Digital Manga Publishing
- Published: February 10, 2007

Blue Sky (青い空があればそれでいい, Aoi Sora ga Areba Sore de Ii) is a one-shot Japanese manga written and illustrated by Yuko Kuwabara. It is licensed in North America by Digital Manga Publishing, which released the manga through its imprint, Juné, on July 8, 2008.

== Reception ==
Mania Entertainment's Julie Rosato found the manga neither too angsty or too cloying, describing it as predictable enough, but pleasant. Leroy Douresseaux, writing for Comic Book Bin, liked that the characters were uncertain about their relationship, and were concerned with coming out of the closet, and appreciated that the relationships presented were shown at varying levels of intimacy. Holly Ellingwood, writing for Active Anime enjoyed the artwork.
