= Passion (manga) =

Japanese manga series

熱情 (Netsujyou)
- Genre: Boy's Love
- Manga
- Written by: Shinbou Gotoh (author) and Shoko Takaku (illustrator)
- Published by: Tokuma Shoten
- English publisher: NA: Digital Manga Publishing
- Original run: November 2, 2004 – October 23, 2007
- Volumes: 4

Passion (熱情, Netsujyou) is a Japanese yaoi manga series written by Shinbou Gotoh and illustrated by Shoko Takaku. Originally published by Tokuma Shoten Publishing in Japan, the series is licensed and published in English in North America by Digital Manga Publishing.

The four-book series follows the romantic entanglements between Shima, a male high school teacher, and a male student at his school, Hikaru Umino, as well as Shima's ex-lover, Amamiya, who also teaches at Shima and Hikaru's school. The first two books in the series detail Shima and Hikaru's relationship while Hikaru is still a high school student. In books three and four, Hikaru has graduated to university, and is struggling to juggle university, his part-time jobs, and his still-shaky relationship with Shima.

The first book was translated by Ten Ten, and was notable for being poorly translated, with awkward language and many grammar mistakes. However, books three and four, translated by Sachiko Sato, an experienced translator, showed significant improvements in the translation quality.

== Characters ==
Hikaru Umino
A brash, but somewhat naive senior high school student. Hikaru has been in love with teacher Shima for over a year. Shinbou Gotoh describes Hikaru as "innocent and simple... almost like an elementary school boy". Throughout the four books, Hikaru is often described as being like a puppy. Although popular among girls, he shows no interest in them.
Kuniaki Shima
A teacher at Hikaru's school, but not Hikaru's teacher. He has been working at the school for six years. He admits that his personal fault is that he is very jealous and loves too much. Kuniaki has been single for a long time.
Ryuuichi Amamiya
A teacher at Hikaru's school, and Kuniaki's ex-lover. Ryuuichi has a 'playboy' personality and dates both men and women. Kuniaki and Ryuuichi have been friends since they were children, and were lovers in high school, but Ryuuichi felt stifled by Kuniaki's love and dumped him. Despite this, Ryuuichi is extremely jealous and protective of Kuniaki, and consistently tries to get Kuniaki to take him back.
Chihaya Morikawa
The school nurse. Chihaya is patient, level-headed, but slyly flirtatious. She understands how to motivate and manipulate Ryuuichi.
Tsukasa Katayama
Hikaru's university girlfriend. She is flirtatious and opportunistic, and Hikaru admits that he knows that she is only with him until she finds someone better.
Mami Onodo
A lowerclassman in Hikaru's school. She has been nursing a secret crush on Hikaru since before he graduated, but is incredibly shy in Hikaru's presence. Hikaru is completely oblivious to her flirting.
Nagisa
An 'older' man who works with Hikaru and other university-aged students at the cafe. Nagisa is flirtatious and overly affectionate towards Hikaru, clearly trying to start a relationship with him, but Hikaru is oblivious to his advances.

== Plot ==
=== Book One ===
Book One begins with senior student Hikaru Umino luring teacher Mr. Shima into an empty classroom afterschool and raping him. Shima complains about Hikaru's poor technique and asks him to "take responsibility" for his actions. Hikaru responds with marriage proposal, but Shima harshly tells Hikaru he doesn't love him, and to think about how to apologize. Hikaru agonizes over his actions, becoming depressed when he sees the scratch marks left on his back, imagining that Shima was in horrible pain. Nevertheless, he stalks Shima, visiting his apartment block every day after school.

Meanwhile, Shima continuously flirts with Hikaru, then, after finding him lurking around outside, invites him in and initiates sex with him, telling Hikaru that he can atone for the earlier rape by being pretend lovers until Hikaru graduates, but they can only play lovers if Hikaru's grades are good; therefore, Hikaru must earn good exam scores if he wants to go on dates with Shima.

Meanwhile, Amamiya has asked Shima to get back together with him, but Shima refused. In order to get Shima to "take him seriously" Amamiya attempts to force him while they're both drunk at a party, but Shima brutally fights back and tells Amamiya "If you're rough with me, I'll do the same to you", which contrasts his passivity with Hikaru in a similar encounter. Shima gives Hikaru his cellphone number with the promise that if Hikaru gets good grades, he can have dates and phone calls with Shima.

=== Book Two ===
Book Two opens just prior to the second semester. Shima has bought a car and Hikaru and Shima go on a number of dates, including a trek to a mountain temple to make their New Year's prayers, where Hikaru fears it will be the last time he is able to be with Shima. Because he has to study for entrance exams, Shima refuses to see him for fear of disrupting his studying. Without ever going on another date with Shima, Hikaru graduates. The "play acting" quietly comes to an end. Hikaru asks Shima for his favorite watch as a graduation present, which Shima gives him, and after that they separate. Both become depressed.

Hikaru and Shima eventually see each other when a group of graduated seniors, including Hikaru and his girlfriend, Tsukasa, return to school to attend the school festival. However, Hikaru and Shima don't speak, and avoid each other. Amamiya takes Hikaru aside and tells him that Shima is depressed and not eating, and has sold his car. Hikaru confronts Shima, but Shima refuses to admit anything and tells Hikaru to go back to his girlfriend. Angry, Hikaru tells Shima that Tsukasa is just using him as a placeholder, gives Shima back his watch and storms out, then realizes he dropped his phone. When he returns, he finds Shima in the same place, crying.

Shima admits that he loved Hikaru for a long time, so he manipulated him by teasing and flirting and encouraging him with physical actions until Hikaru became overwhelmed and "forced" himself on Shima. He tells Hikaru that it wasn't rape because it was what Shima wanted, and that his scratches came from Shima 'holding on', not fighting him. Shima also admits that he felt guilty, and as penance, severed their play-acting so that Hikaru could have a good love life in the future, without being burdened by a serious relationship. However, Shima's plan did not work, as Hikaru's love life is dysfunctional. Hikaru proposes that they act as pretend lovers until he graduates from university, with the agreement that if either one finds someone better, they can leave the relationship. Shima agrees, and the two lovers reunite. Amamiya announces himself completely over Shima, and begins an affair with the school nurse, Ms. Morikawa.

=== Book Three ===
Book Three begins a year after the events of Book Two, and Hikaru and Shima are still "playing lovers". Hikaru now works at a cafe part-time and Shima is the chairperson of the school festival. Because they are both so busy, it's been a long time since they've seen each other, but Hikaru calls Shima everyday when he takes a break at the cafe. During one call, they make plans to meet at the high school festival, and afterwards spend the night together. Meanwhile, Mami, an underclassman who has a crush on Hikaru, frequently visits Hikaru's cafe to flirt, but he's oblivious. Hikaru's coworkers laugh about his obliviousness, and inform new worker Nagisa that Hikaru has a crush on a beautiful teacher from his old high school, which they call a "Madonna". The young coworkers mistakenly think the Madonna is Ms. Morikawa, the school nurse. Nagisa is pleased to hear that Hikaru is not in a relationship, and stakes his claim on Hikaru by openly flirting and hugging Hikaru in front of Mami, who becomes disturbed.

During school the next day, Shima, who is becoming run down due to his committee position, takes a nap in the curtained bed in the nurse's office. A while later, Mami comes in to talk to Ms. Morikawa, who knows about her crush on Hikaru. Mami complains about the older Nagisa shamelessly flirting and touching Hikaru at the cafe. Morikawa is unsure whether Shima, on the bed behind the curtain, has heard. However, Shima later sends Hikaru a text message saying that Hikaru does not need to come to the festival.

Hikaru reads this as a direct order not to attend, and becomes panicked that he has upset his lover. Shima ignores Hikaru's phone calls, but berates himself for being so jealous, and eventually shows up and suggests that he and Hikaru buy matching rings, trying to keep his jealousy a secret in order to not scare Hikaru.

A month or so later, Shima, Morikawa, and Amamiya come to visit Hikaru at his cafe to take him out to lunch. His coworkers, seeing him so flustered, all assume that Ms. Morikawa is the object of his affections, but she is clearly with Amamiya. They tell Hikaru that he doesn't have a chance with his "Madonna" because Amamiya is much better-looking. Hikaru believes they are talking about Amamiya and Shima, because they are ex-lovers. Nagisa also tells Hikaru that his "Madonna" is probably using him because he is so young and inexperienced, and that they are "ill matched". Hikaru's self-confidence suffers and he begins to wonder if Shima actually loves him, since he never shows any jealousy.

=== Book Four ===
Book Four picks up immediately following the events in Book Three, with Shima and Hikaru canceling their ring shopping to go back to Hikaru's place. However, their love-making is interrupted by each of them expressing their fear that the other wants to leave the relationship. Shima believes Hikaru is in love with Nagisa, while Hikaru, who knows that Amamiya broke up with Shima because Shima was too obsessive, believes that this lack of obsession towards Hikaru means that Shima doesn't love him very much. Both try to hide the obsessive feelings that they believe are too frightening, oppressive, and immature. However, when Nagisa shows up at Hikaru's apartment, the two lovers admit their serious feelings to each other.

The story then skips to the high school festival, where Mami prepares to plainly confess her feelings to Hikaru. However, she runs into Nagisa first, who is also looking for Hikaru. Nagisa flirts with Mami, but she tells him they are rivals. Shima interrupts this, and Nagisa, unaware of Shima's identity as Hikaru's "Madonna", flirts with him and invites him to tea. Shima, curious about his rival, agrees.

Mami, worried about her favored teacher, reports to Morikawa that Shima has been "taken hostage" by Nagisa. Amamiya, who has been napping in Morikawa's office, hears this, and gets up to go "rescue" Shima. His intervention is unnecessary, but Shima once again feels guilty for letting his jealousy get the better of him. Meanwhile, Nagisa is once again annoying Mami, and during a discussion about Hikaru, mentions Hikaru's supposed relationship with Ms. Morikawa. Mami, thinking that Ms. Morikawa listened to all of her personal confessions about her love of Hikaru, while secretly laughing at her, goes searching the roof for the school nurse, but doesn't find her. Mami and Nagisa call a temporary truce to search for Hikaru, who is meeting Shima in an empty classroom for a quiet interlude.

Mami then confronts Morikawa in her office, with Nagisa trailing behind, but Morikawa admits her relationship with Amamiya (who is once again napping on the clinic bed), and quietly displays her engagement ring. Nagisa immediately realizes that this only leaves Shima as Hikaru's mystery lover, although Mami has not figured this out yet. Nagisa and Mami continue to roam the school looking for Hikaru, while gently teasing each other and discussing their favorite parts of Hikaru.

Hikaru and Shima, after only a kiss, leave the empty classroom so that Shima can go take care of the festival. However, Hikaru is worried about Shima and chases after him, catching him right before he falls down some stairs, and then catches Shima again when he almost falls back off the stairs, hugging him close in full view of both Nagisa, Mami, and many students. Both Nagisa and Mami must admit defeat. Book Four ends with both Shima and Hikaru reaffirming their feelings.

== Recurring Themes ==
Shinobu Gotoh re-uses the high school rooftop and the Social Studies classroom as sites for many of Hikaru and Shima's encounters.

== Novelization ==
Shinobu Gotoh released an illustrated novelization of the first two books in the Passion series, which was published by June, Digital Manga's yaoi publisher, in 2008, titled Passion: Forbidden Lovers. Although the novelization follows the same plot as the manga, and re-uses some of Shoko Takaku's illustrations, it does give the reader some additional information, such as the full names of all of the characters, as well as slightly more in-depth character history. However, much of the dialogue is lifted directly from the manga, and the novelization is often simply referred to as "Passion" as well.

== Reception ==
Kris at ManicAboutManga.com, describes Passion as "a gorgeous release" and gives the first two books a grade of A−, however Johanna Draper Carlson at Manga Worth Reading, derided Passion as "everything bad about the yaoi genre".

At the Journal of the Lincoln Heights Literary Society, I-hsiu Lin concludes that Passion: Forbidden Lovers is "a beautifully short novel ... that isn't overly dramatic but still tugs at your heart". Meanwhile, Jennifer LeBlanc at The Yaoi Review gave it a grade of B−, stating that "the lack of sexual description and length of the overall novel may make you want to think twice". Rachel Bentham at Active Anime says that it is "a great one-shot story".
