= L'Etoile Solitaire =

Japanese manga

- Cover of L'Etoile Solitaire as published by Digital Manga Publishing
- Genre: Yaoi, Romance
- Manga
- Written by: Yuno Ogami
- English publisher: NA: Digital Manga Publishing
- Published: October 15, 2007

L'Etoile Solitaire (溶けた氷 -エトワール・ソリティア-, Toketa Kōri - Itowāru Soritia; "Thawed Ice: The Lone Star") is a one-shot Japanese manga written and illustrated by Yuno Ogami. It is licensed in North America by Digital Manga Publishing, which released the manga through its imprint, Juné, on October 15, 2007.

== Reception ==
Katherine Farmar, writing for Comics Village, found that although the story was formulaic, it was still "charming" and not a "soulless retread". Mania Entertainment's Patricia Beard found that the misunderstandings between Micah's American culture and Yuuki's Japanese culture were refreshing, but found the story of the takeover was done away with too quickly, leaving the story aimless. Active Anime's Holly Ellingwood found that the story was "an entertaining dramatic romance with a fine share of melodrama for the aspiring couple." Jason Thompson found the story "completely predictable", the characters "two-dimensional", and the art "stiff", calling it overall "a particularly weak effort".
