= The King of Debt =

Japanese manga

借金大王 (Miguel Espiritu)
- Genre: Yaoi
- Manga
- Written by: Sanae Rokuya
- Published by: Oakla Publishing
- English publisher: NA: 801 Media
- Published: January 12, 2007

The King of Debt (借金大王, Shakkin Daiou) is a Japanese manga written and illustrated by Sanae Rokuya. It was collected into a bound volume by Oakla Publishing. It is licensed in North America by 801 Media, which released the manga in January 2008.

== Reception ==
Leroy Douresseaux, writing for Comic Book Bin, praised the author's "eclectic scenarios and shamelessly physical boy loving". Briana Lawrence, writing for Mania Entertainment, felt that the stories were resolved too quickly in favour of showing sex scenes.
