= Vampire's Portrait =

Japanese manga

吸血鬼の肖像 (Kyūketsuki no Shōzō)
- Genre: Dark fantasy, yaoi
- Manga
- Written by: Hiroki Kusumoto
- Published by: Oakla Publishing
- English publisher: NA: Digital Manga Publishing
- Original run: March 13, 2007 – January 12, 2008
- Volumes: 2

Vampire's Portrait (吸血鬼の肖像, Kyūketsuki no Shōzō) is a Japanese manga written and illustrated by Hiroki Kusumoto. It is licensed in North America by Digital Manga Publishing, which released the manga's first tankōbon volume through its imprint, Juné, on October 7, 2008. The second volume is due to be released on December 2, 2009. Oakla Publishing released the manga's two tankōbon volume between March 13, 2007, and January 12, 2008.

== Reception ==
Active Anime's Holly Ellingwood commends the manga's art as "dark and seductive". She also commends the manga for its "very funny couple of comic panels and a lovely full color alluring image of Sein on the inside back flap".

Anime News Network's Casey Brienza commends the manga for "a distinctive style of illustration and significantly more plot than is typical of the genre" but criticises it for "lukewarm character development and not much in the way of "yaoi scenes," as they say".

Coolstreak Comics' Leroy Douresseaux comments on the plot and the art of the manga, saying "beyond the story of passionate love, Vampire's Portrait offers an exciting pot boiler of a thriller plot that occasionally had me racing through the pages so fast that I missed a "sex scene" or two. That aspect of Hiroki Kusumoto's story is the kind of melodramatic, pulpy, dark fantasy one might have found in Marvel Comics' 1970s B&W fantasy magazines. However, Kusumoto's art is not like Gene Colan's work on Tomb of Dracula, but instead resembles Saiko Takaki's art for the Vampire Hunter D manga.

Mania.com's Danielle van Gorder commends the manga as "an unexpectedly compelling story that was fast moving and plot-dense, full of action and violence and suspense".
