= Digital Manga =

American publishing company

- Founded: 1996; 30 years ago
- Founder: Hikaru Sasahara
- Country of origin: United States
- Headquarters location: Gardena, California
- Distribution: Diamond Book Distributors (books)
- Publication types: Comics, manga
- Fiction genres: Josei, romance, shōjo, yaoi
- Imprints: 801 Media, DMP Books, DokiDoki, eManga, Juné Manga, Lilyka, Project-H
- Official website: www.digitalmanga.com

Digital Manga is a California-based publishing company that licenses and releases Japanese manga, anime, and related merchandise in the English language.

Digital Manga also owns and operates eManga, a digital publishing site for manga and light novels, that publishes books and e-book editions of works from other publishers.

The non-publishing division includes Pop Japan Travel (a tour service) and several e-retail sites for books and for import products, including Akadot Retail and Yaoi Club.

Since 2011, Digital Manga has utilized Kickstarter for funds. The first Kickstarter project was to reprint Osamu Tezuka's titles, and the most successful project to be funded was to print the Finder series by Yamane Ayano.

== Subdivisions ==
=== Digital Manga Publishing ===
The company has co-published manga with publishing house Dark Horse Comics, including Berserk, Hellsing, The Ring, and Trigun.

==== Imprints ====
- The DMP Books imprint is used for general-audience manga. The company prints how-to books on drawing manga, as well as online tutorials and contests, under the "Manga Academy" imprint.
- Digital Manga Guild is an imprint for titles localized by non-professional translators. Brigid Alverson of Publishers Weekly described it as an attempt to speed up the manga localization process. She explained, "No one is paid up front; the manga is published digitally, and the DMP, the licensor, and the localization team all share the proceeds once the book starts to sell." 1,300 people applied for positions, with 30% passing, and the imprint's first title was released in 2011.
- Akadot Retail was the official retail store for Juné and Digital Manga Publishing. The shop imported manga, clothing, figures, magazines, and miscellaneous merchandise from Japan.
- Juné is DMP's yaoi (male-male romance, also known as boys' love or BL) line of manga, novels, and other related books. Until April 2006, all of DMP's yaoi manga bore the DMP label, but starting with The Art of Loving by Eiki Eiki, a new design was displayed on the dust cover, featuring a white rose beneath Juné's text logo. The imprint was named after the Japanese magazine June, which in turn was named after Jean Genet, particularly the Japanese pronunciation of "Genet" as "Jooneh". Some Juné titles originally published by Taiyoh Tosho or Oakla Publishing are co-branded with the Japanese publisher, whose logo appears on the spine. As of October 2016, the imprint Juné and the store Akadot joined forces to become a singular shop. The new store, purely under the Juné Manga name, sells all DMI's forms of yaoi in both print and digital titles (including 801 Media and Doki Doki titles).
- 801 Media is a division of Digital Manga, Inc. and sister company to DMP, formed in 2006 to publish more explicit, uncensored yaoi titles. These titles are available on the new Juné website as of October 2016. In June 2016, Libre Publishing terminated their partnership with Digital Manga Publishing, affecting the release of their yaoi titles.
- In April 2009, DMP announced the DokiDoki line in cooperation with the Japanese publisher Shinshokan, to license shounen-ai (male-male romance) and shōjo (girls') manga from Shinshokan's Wings, Dear, and Dear+ anthologies. The name DokiDoki comes from the onomatopoeia for a heartbeat in Japanese.
- Project-H is the hentai (pornographic) imprint of Digital Manga Inc.'s 801 Media division. It publishes seinen (young adult men's) hentai manga.
- Lilyka is Digital Manga Inc.'s yuri (female-female romance) manga imprint, specializing in dōjinshi (self-published) works. The imprint was formed in 2019.

== Publications ==
- 9th Sleep
- After I Win
- Ai no Kusabi
- Alcohol, Shirt and Kiss
- Alice the 101st (Incomplete release)
- All Nippon Air Line
- Angelic Runes (Incomplete release)
- Antique Bakery
- Aqua Bless
- Aria the Scarlet Ammo
- Author's Pet
- Awaken Forest
- Bambi and Her Pink Gun
- Barefoot Waltz
- Berserk (manga)
- Beyond My Touch
- Black Sun (manga)
- Bladedance of Elementalers
- Blue Sheep Reverie
- Blue Sky (manga)
- Bond(z)
- Boys Love (manga)
- Brilliant Blue (manga)
- Café Kichijouji
- Camera, Camera, Camera
- Can't Win with You!
- Candy (manga)
- Cat Planet Cuties
- Clan of the Nakagamis
- Classmates (manga)
- Clear Skies!
- Close the Last Door
- Coffin of Cerebrum
- Color (manga)
- The Color of Love (manga)
- Constellations in My Palm
- Cut (manga)
- Cute Beast
- Dash!
- The Day of Revolution
- Diabolo
- Dear Myself
- Demon City Shinjuku
- Desire (manga)
- The Devil's Secret
- Does the Flower Blossom?
- Dog × Cat
- Don't Blame Me (manga)
- Don't Rush Love
- Don't Say Anymore, Darling
- Double Trouble (manga)
- Dry Heat (manga)
- Duetto (manga)
- Dust 8
- Eat or Be Eaten
- Electric Hands
- Earthian
- Enchanter (manga)
- Endless Rain (manga)
- Erementar Gerade (incomplete release of the sequel Erementar Gerade: Flag of Bluesky)
- Fafner in the Azure
- Fake Fur (manga)
- Family Complex
- Finder (manga)
- The First Stage of Love
- Flower of Life
- A Foreign Love Affair
- Freefall Romance
- From Up Above
- Garden Dreams
- A Gentleman's Kiss
- Glass Sky
- Golden Prince and Argent King
- Gorgeous Carat
- The Guilty (novel series)
- Happiness Recommended
- Happy Boys
- The "Hentai" Prince and the Stony Cat
- Heroes are Extinct
- Hero Heel
- Hey, Class President!
- Hey, Sensei?
- Hidan no Aria (Incomplete release)
- Hideyuki Kikuchi's Vampire Hunter D
- Hot Limit (manga)
- Hot Steamy Glasses
- Hybrid Child
- I'll Be Your Slave
- I'm Not Your Steppin' Stone: Shameless
- Ichigenme... The First Class is Civil Law
- Ikebukuro West Gate Park
- Il gatto sul G
- Iris Zero
- Itazura na Kiss
- Jazz (manga)
- Junior Escort
- Ka Shin Fu
- Kabuki (manga)
- Kimagure Orange Road
- The King of Debt
- Kinokoinu: Mushroom Pup
- Kiss Blue
- Kizuna: Bonds of Love
- Kodomo no Jikan
- Kurashina Sensei's Passion
- La Esperança
- L'Etoile Solitaire
- La Satanica
- Laugh Under the Sun
- Little Butterfly
- Little Cry Baby
- Live For Love (manga)
- Living for Tomorrow
- Love Control
- Love Is Like a Hurricane
- Love/Knot
- Loveholic (manga)
- Lover's Flat
- Lover's Pledge
- Loving Gaze
- Ludwig II (manga)
- Maiden Rose
- Melted Love
- Moon & Blood (This series was a DMP exclusive that was originally released in English first)
- The Moon and the Sandals
- My Darling Is a Foreigner
- My Only King
- My Paranoid Next Door Neighbor
- Necratoholic
- No Touching At All
- Not Enough Time (manga)
- Only Serious About You
- Only the Ring Finger Knows
- Ordinary Crush
- Othello (Toui Hasumi manga)
- Our Everlasting
- Otodama: Voice from the Dead
- Our Kingdom
- Passion (manga)
- Passionate Theory
- Pathos (manga)
- Picnic (manga)
- Planet Ladder
- The Prime Minister's Secret Diplomacy
- Prince Charming (manga)
- Princess Lucia
- Princess Ninja Scroll: Tenka Musō
- Princess Princess
- Princess Princess Plus (spin-off of Princess Princess)
- Private Teacher!
- A Promise of Romance
- Red (manga)
- Red Angel
- Rin!
- Robot: Super Color Comic
- Romantic Illusions
- S (novel series)
- Seduce Me After the Show
- See Me After Class
- Seven Days (manga)
- SHWD
- The Sky Over My Spectacles
- Solfege (manga)
- Speed Racer
- Starry Sky (Incomplete release)
- Steal Moon
- A Strange and Mystifying Story
- Sweet Blue Flowers
- Tachibanakan To Lie Angle
- Taimashin
- Train Train
- Twilight of the Dark Master
- Twittering Birds Never Fly
- The Tyrant Falls in Love
- Under Grand Hotel
- Vampire's Portrait
- Velvet Kiss
- The Way to Heaven
- White Brand
- Wild Butterfly
- Worst (manga)
- Yellow (manga)
- You Make My Head Spin!
- Ze (manga)

=== Osamu Tezuka series ===
- Age of Adventure
- Alabaster
- The Amazing 3
- Atomcat
- Barbera
- Brave Dan
- Captain Ken
- The Castle Of Dawn
- Clockwork Apple
- The Crater
- Crime And Punishment
- Lemon Kid
- Leo the Lion Cub
- Ludwig B
- Melody of Iron
- Mr. Cactus
- New Treasure Island
- Record of the Glass Castle
- The Shinsengumi
- Storm Fairy
- Swallowing the Earth
- Triton of the Sea
- Under the Air
- Unico (2nd edition)
