= Endless Rain (manga) =

Japanese manga

音のない雨は降り続く (Oto no Nai Ame wa Furitsuzuku)
- Genre: Yaoi
- Manga
- Written by: Yuuya
- Published by: Ookura Shuppan
- English publisher: NA: Digital Manga Publishing
- Published: November 11, 2006

Endless Rain (音のない雨は降り続く, Oto no Nai Ame wa Furitsuzuku) is a Japanese manga written and illustrated by Yuuya. It is licensed in North America by Digital Manga Publishing, which released the manga through its June imprint, on May 13, 2008.

== Reception ==
Danielle Van Gorder felt the plot had "some of the least believable characters or situations I've read, lame plot devices, and what is quite possibly the most contrived ending ever to grace a BL book" and that the translation "was plagued with stilted lines", but praised Yuuya's "slick and polished" art, feeling that the art was the only reason to recommend Endless Rain. Holly Ellingwood, writing for Active Anime, praised the character designs, saying that they "immediately capture one's attention", and noted the "heady emotional content" of the manga, and "incendiary" explicit scenes. Leroy felt the manga would "appeal to one's prurient interests", while noting the author's "deep character drama".
