= SHWD =

Japanese manga series

- SHWD: Special Hazardous Waste Disposal
- Volume 1 English cover

SHWD《シュード》
- Genre: Action; Yuri; Supernatural
- Manga
- Written by: sono.N
- Published by: Jitsugyo no Nihon Sha
- English publisher: NA: Seven Seas Entertainment
- Magazine: Comic Ruelle
- Original run: June 19, 2020 – February 17, 2023
- Volumes: 3

SHWD: Special Hazardous Waste Disposal (Japanese: SHWD《シュード》) is a Japanese yuri manga written and illustrated by sono.N. It was first published as an original doujinshi at COMITIA in 2018, and was later serialized online via Jitsugyo no Nihon Sha's Comic Ruelle from June 2020 to February 2023. It is licensed for an English-language release by Digital Manga and Seven Seas Entertainment.

== Synopsis ==
The story follows Koga, a new recruit at the Tokyo branch of SHWD, Special Hazardous Waste Disposal, that specializes in disposing of the mysterious biological weapon "Dynamis" that have appeared across the world. Working alongside her training officer Sawada, the two form a team that aims to take on the monsters head on in close combat.

== Publication ==
Written and illustrated by sono.N, SHWD was first published as an original doujinshi at COMITIA 124 in 2018. It was later serialized online via Jitsugyo no Nihon Sha's Comic Ruelle on June 19, 2020, to February 17, 2023. The series has been collected in three tankōbon volumes as of June 2023.

The original doujinshi was licensed for an English release under Digital Manga's Lilyka imprint, before later merging with eManga. The serialized version is licensed for an English release in North America by Seven Seas Entertainment. In 2024 Seven Seas Entertainment announced an omnibus collection of the series titled "SHWD: The Complete Yuri Collection".

No.	Original release date	Original ISBN	English release date	English ISBN
1	April 15, 2021	978-4-40-864006-8	October 11, 2022; June 17, 2025	978-1-63858-570-1
2	August 18, 2022	978-4-40-864065-5	June 17, 2025	979-8-89373-396-9
3	June 15, 2023	978-4-40-864096-9	June 17, 2025	979-8-89373-396-9

== Reception ==
Erica Friedman of Yuricon praised the series giving all 3 volumes an overall 8 out of 10, noting of sono.N's art that the "series is a love letter to huge, muscular woman." And in her review of volume 2, "this a solid action series, with powerful backstories and a pretty thin plot so far. One hopes that it will be given time to develop, so we get a current timeline story along with the puzzle pieces of the backstories." Nicki Bauman likewise praised the series in her review of the original doujinshi, summarizing that "there is something here for everyone to enjoy, whether you like muscular girls bathing, cute girl meets girl romances, pulse-pounding action, and, for all you nerds out there, literary analysis."
