= Love/Knot =

Japanese manga

- Genre: Yaoi
- Manga
- Written by: Hiroko Ishimaru
- Published by: Frontier Works
- English publisher: NA: Digital Manga Publishing
- Magazine: Daria (Frontier Works)
- Original run: 2005 – ???
- Volumes: 1

Love/Knot is a Japanese yaoi manga written and illustrated by Hiroko Ishimaru. It is licensed in North America by Digital Manga Publishing, which released the manga through its imprint June, on 25 February 2009.

== Reception ==
Melinda Beasi appreciated the leads' "warm and consensual" relationship, but felt that the most interesting parts of the story were poorly developed. Rachel Bentham enjoyed the art style. Leroy Dessaroux found the story to be strongly reminiscent of a traditional romance novel. Patricia Beard disliked the characterisation, feeling that the characters were too much like "BL paper dolls", and disliking the softening of the villain, recommending Ishimaru's Total Surrender over Love/Knot.
