= Lover's Flat =

Japanese manga written and illustrated by Hyouta Fujiyama

1Kアパートの恋 (Wan-kei Apāto no Koi)
- Genre: Yaoi
- Manga
- Written by: Hyouta Fujiyama
- Published by: Ohto Shobo
- English publisher: NA: Digital Manga Publishing
- Published: February 2001
- Volumes: 1

Lover's Flat (Japanese: 1Kアパートの恋, Hepburn: Wan-kei Apāto no Koi) is a Japanese manga written and illustrated by Hyouta Fujiyama. It is licensed in North America by Digital Manga Publishing, which released the manga through its imprint, Juné, on 1 August 2007. It looks at two couples who are neighbours in an apartment complex.

== Reception ==
Mania Entertainment's Julie Rosato described the characters as "endearing and entertaining", and enjoyed the parallels between the stories of the two couples. Katherine Farmar, writing for Comics Village, appreciated that there was not a 'blissful' ending after the couples confess their feelings, and appreciated the realistic problems in the relationships, and the realistic working through of those problems. Farmar notes that Lover's Flat is an early work by Fujiyama, and so it overuses screentone and does not have a settled style.
