= From Up Above =

Japanese manga

ある日空から突然に。 (Aru Hi Sora Kara Totsuzen ni)
- Genre: Yaoi
- Manga
- Written by: Sakuya Kurekoshi
- Published by: Ookura Shuppan
- English publisher: NA: Digital Manga Publishing
- Published: 12 April 2006

From Up Above (ある日空から突然に。, Aru Hi Sora Kara Totsuzen ni) is a Japanese manga written and illustrated by Sakuya Kurekoshi. It is licensed in North America by Digital Manga Publishing, which released the manga through its imprint, Juné, on 25 November 2007.

== Reception ==
Mania Entertainment's Patricia Beard felt it was disappointing that more of From Up Above had not been released, as she felt it had a "cute story", and that Kurekoshi's art had "a fluidity and ease in the style" which lent itself to the tone of the story. Holly Ellingwood, writing for Active Anime, compared From Up Above to Fushigi Yuugi, praising the "imagination" in the details of the story, and Kurekoshi's "flowing art" and story.
