= Melted Love =

Japanese manga

どうせ、めろめろ (Dōse, Meromero)
- Genre: Yaoi
- Manga
- Written by: You Takumi
- Published by: Kaiōsha
- English publisher: NA: Digital Manga Publishing
- Published: 10 October 2006

Melted Love (どうせ、めろめろ, Dōse, Meromero) is a Japanese manga written and illustrated by You Takumi. It is licensed in North America by Digital Manga Publishing, which released the manga through its imprint, Juné, on 22 September 2007.

== Reception ==
Holly Ellingwood, writing for Active Anime, was impressed at the diversity of the stories in the anthology. Danielle Van Gorder, writing for Mania Entertainment, came to enjoy the "oddball characters" and "quirky humor" in the stories.
