= Eat or Be Eaten =

Japanese light novel

- Cover of Eat or Be Eaten as published by Frontier Works

食うか食われるか (Kuu ka Kuwareru ka)
- Genre: Yaoi
- Light novel
- Written by: Jinko Fuyuno
- Illustrated by: Yamimaru Enjin
- Published by: Frontier Works
- English publisher: NA: Digital Manga Publishing

Eat or Be Eaten (Japanese: 食うか食われるか, Hepburn: Kuu ka Kuwareru ka) is a light novel with homoerotic themes written by Jinko Fuyuno and illustrated by Yamimaru Enjin, author of works such as The Way To Heaven and Voice or Noise. It was published by Frontier Works in Japanese, and was published in English by Digital Manga Publishing in May 2009.

== Reception ==
Rachel Bentham, writing for Active Anime, enjoyed the building of the story and the lush illustrations. Patricia Beard, writing for Mania Entertainment, found Tsubaki difficult to relate to, as he is a "food-centric" character, and found the use of the phrase "Just relax" to signify anal sex to "sound odd". Michelle Smith, writing for Pop Culture Shock, appreciated that the characters were adults who thought about more things than just their romance, but found the language "simplistic", with some "cheesy lines".
