= After I Win =

Japanese one-shot manga

- Cover of After I Win as published by Houbunsha

ほしがりません!勝つまでは (Hoshigarimasen! Katsumade wa)
- Genre: Yaoi, Romance
- Manga
- Written by: Kaname Itsuki
- Published by: Houbunsha
- English publisher: NA: Digital Manga Publishing
- Published: December 19, 2007
- Volumes: 1

After I Win (Japanese: ほしがりません!勝つまでは, Hepburn: Hoshigarimasen! Katsumade wa) is a one-shot Japanese manga written and illustrated by Kaname Itsuki. It is licensed in North America by Digital Manga Publishing, which released the manga through its imprint, Juné, on December 19, 2007.

== Reception ==
Mania Entertainment's Patricia Beard commends the manga on "very pretty" character designs but criticises the awkward story "due to the assumed need to fit in another masturbation scene or reason for another masturbation scene". Comic Book Bin's Leroy Douresseaux comments that the "boy on boy boot knockin' takes a backseat to this gentle story of awkward first love". Hannah Santiago, writing for the appendix to Manga: The Complete Guide, found the story "unexceptional", and the art "inoffensively bland". She found the character of the "oversexed older brother" to be "creepy", but welcomed him as the manga's only character to stand out.
