= A Promise of Romance =

Novel

- Genre: Yaoi
- Light novel
- Written by: Kyoko Akitsu
- Illustrated by: Tooko Miyagi
- Published by: Taiyoh Tosho
- English publisher: US: Digital Manga Publishing
- Published: May 2008 (English)
- Volumes: 1

A Promise of Romance (契約 ブランドロマンス, Keiyaku - Brand Romance) is a light novel with homoerotic themes. It was published by Taiyoh Tosho in Japanese, and was published in English by Digital Manga Publishing in May 2008.

== Plot ==
The bored young English Lord Edward discovers that unless he is wed by his 26th birthday, the family fortune will pass to another. He had previously given away his family ring, which is traditionally worn by the heir's fiancée, two years earlier to a prostitute named Brenda, and resolves to find the woman and hope that she will enter into a sham marriage with him. Satsuki, a Japanese exchange student studying drama, is struggling to make ends meet and works in a pub visited by Brenda, who has become gravely ill. Before she dies, he gives Satsuki a ring, asking him to return it to its rightful owner. Edward and Satsuki meet at the pub where Satsuki works, and Edward asks Satsuki to give Brenda a message. Satsuki goes to tell Brenda but finds that she had died several days earlier. As Brenda is dead, Satsuki later visits Edward at his apartment to deliver the news and return the ring. When he does this, a drunk Edward offers Satsuki £300 per day to pretend to be his fiancée. Satsuki at first refuses but later takes him up on his offer as he needs money to stay in school.

While pretending to be Edward's fiancée, Satsuki comes up against Edward's cousin Angelica, who wants to marry Edward and take control of the family fortune. Angelica does various things to try to ruin their engagement, such as forcing Edward to escort her instead of Satsuki to a party and then throwing wine on Satsuki's dress at the party to prevent her from dancing with Edward in public. Satsuki becomes a wallflower and ends up talking to and dancing with a foreign prince. When Edward sees this, he becomes violently jealous and leaves the party. When they return to the apartment, Edward gets drunk, and in a fit of jealous rage, rapes Satsuki. Here, it is found that Edward has fallen in love with Satsuki. However, after this, Satsuki becomes cold towards Edward, but continues their agreement to teach Edward the lesson that money cannot buy everything.

Later on, Satsuki's friend Yohei from Japan visits and confesses his feelings to Satsuki, but Satsuki can only think of Edward. Satsuki realizes that he is in love with Edward. However, after Angelica again tries to ruin the engagement by making Edward believe that Satsuki is cheating on him with Yohei, Edward quits speaking to Satsuki. Due to Angelica's interferences, they decide to move the fake wedding up a month and so Satsuki and Edward marry. Afterward, Satsuki confesses to Edward that he helped Edward, not for the money but because he loves Edward. Edward returns his feelings and the two consummate their marriage. The morning after, they leave for the airport together, and Edward resolves to live without his fortune to be with Satsuki.

== Reception ==
Rachel Bentham, writing for Active Anime, found the story reminded her of historical romance fiction. Briana Lawrence, writing for Mania Entertainment, felt that the pace of the final chapter was disappointing, but enjoyed the rest of the novel, especially when Satsuki was traumatised by his rape.
