= Barefoot Waltz =

Japanese manga

- English edition of Barefoot Waltz, published by Digital Manga Publishing's imprint, Juné on October 7, 2008.

裸足でワルツを (Hadashi de Waltz o)
- Genre: Romance, Yaoi
- Manga
- Written by: Romuko Miike
- Published by: Houbunsha
- English publisher: NA: Digital Manga Publishing
- Magazine: Hana Oto
- Published: July 29, 2006
- Volumes: 1

Barefoot Waltz (裸足でワルツを, Hadashi de Waltz o) is a Japanese manga written and illustrated by Romuko Miike. The manga was serialized in Houbunsha's manga magazine, Hana Oto. The individual chapters were collected into a one-shot, which was published by Hobunsha on July 29, 2006. It was licensed in English by Digital Manga Publishing under its Juné imprint, which released the manga on October 7, 2008.

== Reception ==
Mania.com's Danielle van Gorder has mixed reception about Miike's art with "Miike's art is gorgeous, wispy and light, but with strong, assured linework rather than flyaway sketchy lines. Her character designs aren't always as distinct as they could be, especially across some of the stories, and anatomical proportions are sometimes a little off, but she makes excellent use of negative space, and screentone." Comic Book Bin's Leeroy Douresseaux commends the title story, which is "the strongest in terms of character and story and is worthy of getting an entire volume to itself. The other stories range from standard to better-than-average boys' love fare." ActiveAnime's Rachel Bentham commends the yaoi anthology's "decent art", which "has varying explicitness depending on which story it is."
