= Don't Rush Love =

Japanese manga by Mio Tennohji

恋はあせらず (Koha Aserazu)
- Genre: Yaoi
- Manga
- Written by: Mio Tennohji
- Published by: Core Magazine
- English publisher: NA: 801 Media
- Magazine: drap
- Published: 2006

Don't Rush Love (恋はあせらず, Koha Aserazu) is a Japanese one-shot manga written and illustrated by Mio Tennohji. It is licensed in North America by 801 Media, which released it in January 2009.

== Reception ==
Leroy Douresseaux, writing for the Comic Book Bin, felt that the theme of the manga was that "meaningless sex" can take place quickly, whereas building a real relationship takes time and is fraught with difficulties. . Rachel Bentham, writing for Active Anime, felt that Tennohji's art set the manga apart.

== See also ==
- List of manga magazines
