= Author's Pet =

2008 one-shot Japanese manga

- Cover of Author's Pet as published by Magazine Magazine

作家、ドレイを飼う。 (Sakka, Dorei o Kau)
- Genre: Yaoi, Romance
- Manga
- Written by: Deathco Cotorino
- Published by: Magazine Magazine
- English publisher: NA: Digital Manga Publishing
- Published: August 26, 2008
- Volumes: 1

Author's Pet (Japanese: 作家、ドレイを飼う。, Hepburn: Sakka, Dorei o Kau) is a one-shot Japanese manga written and illustrated by Deathco Cotorino. It is licensed in North America by Digital Manga Publishing, which released the manga through its imprint, Juné, on August 26, 2008.

== Reception ==
ActiveAnime's Holly Ellingwood commends the manga for its attractive art style "with some explicit scenes that are not overly graphic yet very tender". Mania.com's Danielle van Gorder comments on the variety of the length of the stories and the stories themselves allowed the book to remain "fresh and unpredictable, despite the general lack of development". Comic Book Bin's Leroy Douresseaux comments that the manga's "tales are fun, sexy, comic romps full of good-natured, lustful ribbing".
