= Don't Blame Me (manga) =

Japanese manga series

- Cover of the first Japanese volume of on't Blame Me

俺は悪くない (Ore wa Warukunai)
- Genre: Yaoi
- Manga
- Written by: Yugi Yamada
- Published by: Houbunsha
- English publisher: NA: Digital Manga Publishing
- Original run: June 2000 – October 2000
- Volumes: 2

Don't Blame Me (Japanese: 俺は悪くない, Hepburn: Ore wa Warukunai) is a Japanese manga written and illustrated by Yugi Yamada. It is licensed in North America by Digital Manga Publishing, which released the manga's two bound volumes through its imprint, Juné, between March 25 and June 24, 2008. Houbunsha releases the manga three tankōbon volumes between June 2000 and October 2000.

== Reception ==
Anime News Network's Casey Brienza commends the manga for its "interesting (and sexy!) characters, a complex, well-conceived plot, and plenty of laughs to lighten up the angsty bits" but criticizes it for "a weak bonus story in volume two and artwork that remains a bit amateurish". Coolstreak Comics' Leroy Douresseaux commends author Yugi Yamada as a "master of complex, passionate psychological dramas". Mania.com's Briana Lawrence comments on the movie aspect of the manga "serving as a tool to highlight the more important things in the manga: Jun and Yutaka's relationship, Toshi and Nakamura's developing relationship, the birth of Miki's baby, and we get to see all the major plot points through the eyes of a camera". Active Anime's Rachel Bentham comments that the manga is "more soap opera antics behind the scenes of this film club".
