= Jazz (manga) =

Japanese manga by Tamotsu Takamure

- Cover of the first re-release volume
- Genre: Yaoi
- Manga
- Written by: Sakae Maeda
- Illustrated by: Tamotsu Takamure
- Published by: Shinshokan
- English publisher: NA: Digital Manga Publishing
- Magazine: Dear+
- Original run: 1999 – 2000
- Volumes: 4

Jazz is a Japanese yaoi manga by Tamotsu Takamure. It was originally published by Shinshokan and released into four tankōbon volumes between December 8, 1999, and June 7, 2000. The series was re-published from September 28, 2004, to February 25, 2006. It has been licensed in the United States and was published by Digital Manga Publishing.

== Plot ==
The story is about Naoki, a young man whose illness haunts him like a curse, making his personal life very difficult to bear. This all changes one day for Naoki when he meets the one person who gives him the happiness to vibrant life for as long as he lives; this person happens to be his caretaker.

As Naoki develops romantic feelings for his caretaker, he struggles with uncertainty over whether those feelings are reciprocated.

A wounded soul never fully recovers: Will Naoki suffer the painful blow of unrequited love or will love will be by his side forever and for always?

== Characters ==
Naoki Segawa
Age - 18 at the start
Family - Mother, father
History - Subjected to suffering from asthma, had finally found love with his doctor. Currently studying at Tokyo University. His family is fairly wealthy, but Naoki supports himself. Very possessive, quick to assume and sexually aggressive towards Koichi.

Dr. Koichi 'Doc' Naruwasa
Age - around late 20 to early 30
Family - Mother & father (deceased)
History - A handsome internal medicine specialist. Had a very emotional distanced relationship with his parents before they died when he was a teenager. A very complicated man with emotional issues. Very timid in his 'relationship' with Naoki.

Michael
Age - around late 20 to early 30
Family - Unknown
History - A friend of Koichi from America. Naoki thought Michael was a member of Koichi's affair, however this was false. Michael seems to be mostly straight. Likes a co-worker named Kathy.

Dr Takino
Age - around late 20 to early 30
Family - Unknown
History - A talented doctor who works in the same hospital as Koichi. Seems to like Koichi, but luckily Dr Muzushima keeps him in line. He is usually upbeat and takes care of everyone.

Dr Muzishima
Age - around late 20 to early 30
Family - Unknown
History - Another doctor at the hospital. Seems to be connected to Dr Takino in a more than professional manner. A quiet and withdrawn man.
