= Our Kingdom =

Japanese manga series

Bokura no Oukoku
- Genre: Yaoi, Romance
- Manga
- Written by: Naduki Koujima
- Published by: Biblos
- English publisher: NA: Digital Manga Publishing
- Magazine: Magazine Be × Boy
- Original run: 2000 – present
- Volumes: 6

Our Kingdom is a yaoi manga by Naduki Koujima about the relationship of Akira Nonaka, a boy from the countryside, and his cousin, Kyle Rei Basil. It is published in English by Digital Manga Publishing. Due to the 2006 Biblos bankruptcy, only the first six volumes have been released in English. It was commissioned by Digital Manga Publishing.

== Story ==
After his maternal grandmother's death, orphan Akira Nonaka is told that he has living relatives on his father's side. His father came from the Takatou family, one of the most wealthy and influential families in Japan. Akira is brought in to compete with his cousin Rei Basil as candidates to become the future head of the Takatou family. Overwhelmed by his change of circumstances, he is happy to have a family again. But as he and Rei grow closer, Akira must come to grip with his true feelings.

The story follows Rei and Akira, their bodyguards, and other Takatou family members.

== Characters ==
Akira Nonaka - An orphan who is brought to live with his paternal relatives after his maternal grandmother died. He has to compete for the position as the Takatou heir.

Kyle Rei Basil - Akira's cousin and rival to the position as the Takatou heir. Rei takes an immediate liking to Akira.

Russel Shigure Kurosaki - Rei's bodyguard. Shigure looks up to his older brother to a fault.

Shizuka Okumiya - Runs the Takatou household. He has taken a shine to Shigure.

Yūji Takatou - Akira's uncle. He is head of one of the Takatou's division and has no desire to be heir. Flirtatious, he likes to cause good-natured trouble for those around him.

Raoul de Bavier Basil - Rei's nephew and rival in the Basil family. He's constantly trying to get Rei to simply acknowledge his presence and sees Akira as a means to an end in that regard. He later fell in love with Akira. After being rejected by both Akira and Rei, he left Japan to the Middle East in the spinoff series, "Our Kingdom: Arabian Nights".

Wilhelm Sagiri Kurosaki - Shigure's older brother. Seemingly cold and emotionless, he insists his brother is unfit to be a bodyguard and for a while takes over the position of guarding Rei.

Tamaki Kaminozuki - One of Rei and Akira's school mates. Hiyori is his childhood friend whom he loves to tease. It seems as though he is blackmailing him with something.

Hiyori Hozumi - One of Rei and Akira's classmates. Tamaki is his childhood friend who enjoys teasing him.
