= All Nippon Air Line =

Japanese manga

- Cover of All Nippon Air Line as released by Digital Manga Publishing

楽園30000フィート―All Nippon Air Line (Rakuen Sanman Feet – All Nippon Air Line)
- Genre: Yaoi, Romance
- Manga
- Written by: Kei Azumaya
- Published by: Magazine Magazine
- English publisher: NA: Digital Manga Publishing
- Published: February 26, 2008
- Volumes: 1

All Nippon Air Line (Japanese: 楽園30000フィート―All Nippon Air Line, Hepburn: Rakuen Sanman Feet – All Nippon Air Line) is a one-shot Japanese manga written and illustrated by Kei Azumaya. It is licensed in North America by Digital Manga Publishing, which released the manga through its imprint, Juné, on February 26, 2008.

== Publication ==
The English version of the manga was released with two covers for the book: one saying "All Nippon Air Line: Paradise at 30,000 Feet" and the other is a dust jacket cover featuring the acronym "ANAL" on its covers, like the Japanese cover of the manga. Juné Manga's jacketless English-language cover removes the logos because "the bookstores didn't want to actually see ANAL written on the cover." DMP also printed the original cover for the manga and gave customers the chance to send away for it or to pick it up in person from a convention.

== Reception ==
Comics Worth Reading's Johanna Draper Carlson criticizes the manga for its character design, saying, "it's as though their heads are too big for their faces, or if the faces are masks layered on top of the real one, or if they have linebacker necks and extra padding under their hair. In short, the proportions are off." ActiveAnime's Rachel Bentham commends the manga, saying that it "goes well beyond the average yaoi comedy." Mania.com's Julie Rosato commends Juné's presentation of the manga saying, "the dust jacket with original coverart has a nice matte finish and a full-color comic on the back, but the rare color plate inside really goes the extra mile. The inside flap has another full-color comic, too." Comics Village's John Thomas criticizes the manga for using rape "as an excusable hiring method left a bad taste in this reviewer's mouth." Seridan Scott wrote in Newtype USA "Clearly, one must thoroughly enjoy the genre to make it through this manga. But for those of us in the know, it's good, dirty fun the whole way through, with enough boy love innuendo and naughty jokes to make any yaoi fan snigger with delight."
