= Duetto (manga) =

Japanese manga series by Aoi Kujyou

デュエット (Deyuetto)
- Genre: Yaoi
- Manga
- Written by: Aoi Kujyou
- Published by: Oakla Publishing
- English publisher: NA: Digital Manga Publishing
- Published: November 12, 2004

Duetto (デュエット, Deyuetto) is a Japanese manga written and illustrated by Aoi Kujyou. It is licensed in North America by Digital Manga Publishing, which released the manga through its imprint, Juné, on 19 December 2007.

== Reception ==
Patricia Beard, writing for Mania, noted Kujyou's "understated" approach, welcoming it as a relief from other "overwrought" yaoi, but feeling that the title story's couple were "dull" and did not show a connection. Leroy Douresseaux, writing for Comic Book Bin, described the title story as being a "drawn out, melodramatic love story that would fit a romance novel", and praised Kujiyou's character designs. Rachel Bentham, writing for Active Anime, noted that tales about long-distance relationships are "rare in yaoi", and also noted the explicitness was reduced for the title story when compared to the bonus stories.
