= Alabaster (manga) =

Manga series written and illustrated by Osamu Tezuka

- Cover of Alabaster volume 1 from the Osamu Tezuka Manga Complete Works edition.

アラバスター (Arabasutā)
- Genre: Suspense
- Manga

Alabaster
- Written by: Osamu Tezuka
- Published by: Akita Shoten
- English publisher: NA: Digital Manga Publishing
- Magazine: Weekly Shōnen Champion
- Original run: December 27, 1970 – June 28, 1971
- Volumes: 3

Alabaster (アラバスター, Arabastā) is a manga series written and illustrated by Osamu Tezuka, published in Akita Shoten's Weekly Shōnen Champion from December 1970 to June 1971. Digital Manga successfully crowdfunded the publication of the manga in English in 2015.

== Plot ==
James Block is a former sports star whose criminal endeavors landed him in jail. In prison he meets "Dr. F", a strange old man who tells James about a beam that can turn living things invisible. After escaping from prison, James finds and uses the laser on himself, but because the beam has not been perfected yet, it only rendered his skin invisible, leaving his insides visible to the outside. Angered at his disfigurement, James takes the name "Alabaster" and begins eliminating the hypocrites and the boastful. He is joined by Ami Ozawa, the granddaughter of "Doctor F", who was rendered invisible after the doctor used his pregnant daughter as an "F Beam" test subject. On their trail is Rock, a vicious FBI agent.

== Characters ==
Alabaster aka James Block

- Alabaster used to be known as James Block, the superstar athlete born and raised in Wisconsin. He won six gold medals in the '72 Olympics at Munich and held five national championship titles. Everyone wanted to know him. Then he fell in love with a TV star named Susan Ross. They dated for a year and when he popped up the question of marriage, she said she only went out with him because he is an Olympic star and mocked his appearance. He tried to kill her but she ended up getting away. In court, she denied ever being in a relationship with him and he ended up being tried guilty and was sentenced to five years in prison.
- In prison, he met Doctor F. He told James about the ray gun that turns people invisible. After his release, he went into Dr. F's house and used the ray gun. It only turned his skin invisible but his insides are visible. If he tried to make himself completely invisible, he will die instantly. With his change came his new name, now going by Alabaster. In prison, he also learned how to flick small rocks and peanuts at people.
- He killed Susan Ross with the ray gun and, with the three escaped convicts, Gen, and Ami, stole jewelry and money from the rich and killed them. He employed more criminals along the way.
- One of the three original convicts used their peanut throwing skill from Alabaster, forcing him to drop his ray gun, and the beam kills him instead.

Susan Ross

- Susan Ross is a TV star who once dated James Block. When he went to jail, she lost her fame and fortune. After his release from prison, he sought her. He used the ray gun, given to him by Doctor F, and killed her.

Doctor F

- Dr. F is Ami's grandfather or her birth-mother's father, who tested his ray gun on her birth-mother. He didn't know that she was pregnant during the test. She became disfigured but gave birth to Ami. Ami was normal at first, but after a while, she became more invisible. When Ami's birth-mother died, she wanted Dr. F to use the ray gun to turn her corpse completely invisible and raise Ami well. He was last seen in prison, after being prosecuted guilty by Prosecutor Ozawa.

Ami Ozawa

- Ami Ozawa was the successful test subject of Dr. F. She is Prosecutor Ozawa's adopted daughter and Dr. F's biological granddaughter. Without her makeup, she is completely invisible, with the exception of her eyes, which are visible. She fell in love with Gen.
- Even with Alabaster's persuasion of the false image of beauty, she didn't kill people with the ray gun. But after Rock rapes her, she understands Alabaster's ideology and kills people with the ray gun. She becomes more and more ruthless as time goes on. At the very end, as she and her brother escape Block's factory, she kills herself.

Kanihei Ozawa

- Kanihei Ozawa is Ami's older brother, not related by blood. He later became a newspaper photographer. He saw Ami's final moments before she committed suicide.

Prosecutor Ozawa

- She is Ami's mother who adopted her when Dr. F was sentenced to prison. She hid the truth from Ami and Kanihei, but since Kanihei was old enough, he instantly knew the truth.

Genya (Gen) Yamagata

- Gen is a delinquent boy who used Ami's invisibility to steal an answer sheet and jewelry. He was found guilty by Ami's mother and went to prison. With Alabaster's and Ami's help, he and three other prisoners escaped. He loves Ami and despises Alabaster. He was willing to betray Alabaster and side with the police for Ami's sake. He dies from gun shots by Rock.

Rock Holmes

- Rock is an FBI agent who only loves himself and Greeks, the descendants of the gods of Mount Olympus. He is put in charge of finding and capturing Alabaster. He detests anything ugly and believes that all other races and ethnicities are hideous. Rock uses tricks and deception to get closer to Alabaster and his organization, and commits cruel acts to get ahead in his investigation.
