= Velvet Kiss =

2009-2012 manga series by Chihiro Harumi

- Genre: Hentai, romance
- Manga
- Written by: Chihiro Harumi
- Published by: Takeshobo
- English publisher: NA: Digital Manga
- Magazine: Vitaman
- Original run: 2009 – 2012
- Volumes: 4

Velvet Kiss (ベルベット・キス, Berubetto Kisu) is a Japanese manga written by Chihiro Harumi which was published by Takeshobo in the magazine Vitaman. Four volumes have been released.

In January 2012, it was licensed for English print distribution by Digital Manga's imprint Project H.

== Plot ==
Shin Nitta is suddenly crushed with debt, but his loan agent tells him he can be freed of the debt if he keeps a certain woman "company". Over time, he learns that doing so is not as easy as he thought.

The relationship between Shin Nitta and Kanoko starts out badly. As Nitta only sees Kanoko as a spoiled brat who can't care less about anyone but herself, he initially just runs errands to keep Kanoko satisfied at a bare minimum. As time passes, Nitta soon discovers the aspects of Kanoko's life that led to her self-centered isolation: Kanoko's stepmother/aunt caused her mother's death as well as her father's illness during the series. It was also Kanoko's aunt who caused Nitta's 80 million-yen debt and set up the companionship, ultimately to discredit Kanoko within her father's company.

By the end of the series, Kanoko and Nitta have both fallen in love with each other. However, since Kanoko has taken over her father's company, she cannot be with Nitta as they both agree that Kanoko has to focus on her new responsibility. Three and a half years later, Nitta has started a new job and Kanoko has taken over her father's company. Her aunt has since been arrested for her crimes. Nitta and Kanoko reunite only to find that Kanoko has to travel overseas to expand the business. Kanoko asks Nitta to come abroad with her but he refuses, claiming his place is in Japan and he is just beginning his career at his new job. They part ways, promising to wait for each other as Kanoko says "see you later" to Nitta.

== Characters ==
Shin Nitta (新田 信, Nitta Shin)
A nearly 30-year-old businessman, who has little luck with women, he was seduced by a woman who pretended to love him by the orders of Yoriko. The girl got him drunk and made him sign a loan agreement for some ¥80 million (~$800,000). His loan agent tells him he can freeze it for as long as he "befriends" a girl. This is revealed to be a girl named Kanoko. In the beginning, he sees her as a spoiled little brat but he falls in love with her.

Kanoko Kikuchiya (菊池屋 花乃子, Kikuchiya Kanoko)
A rich girl that Shin was assigned to. Kanoko is a lonely person belonging to a rich family, with a father and a stepmother, Yoriko. At first, her relationship with Shin only appears to be a forced relationship, with Kanoko taking advantage of the debt to command Shin to do her errands. However, this changes as Shin learns of her childhood, and bonds closer with Kanoko. Kanoko is addicted to sex, as she was influenced by her other friends.

Yoriko Kikuchiya (菊池屋 依子, Kikuchiya Yoriko)
Kanoko's step mother who controls the business aspect of Kikuchiya hospital. She appears to be kind and worries about Kanoko but it is only a façade; she is a manipulative woman who happens to be the one who gave Nitta his debt. Yoriko is having an affair with one of the doctors at the hospital.
