= Princess Ninja Scroll: Tenka Musō =

Shōnen manga

- Tenka Musō

天下無双
- Genre: Historical
- Manga
- Written by: Akane Sasaki
- Published by: Square Enix
- English publisher: NA: Digital Manga Publishing
- Magazine: Monthly Gangan WING
- Original run: 2002 – 2003
- Volumes: 2

Princess Ninja Scroll Tenka Musō (天下無双, Tenka Musō) is a 2-volume shōnen manga by Akane Sasaki. The first volume was released on September 1, 2005, and the second was released on December 28 of the same year.

== Story ==
Hanzou "Han" Hattori is a little girl who lives in a small village and studies ninjutsu under the guide of a fat bird named Juubei, who calls her hime. When Oda Nobunaga's army (an army of robots armed with guns), which already destroyed the shinobi village 5 years before to steal the scroll of Heaven, attacks the village, she reveals herself as the princess of the shinobi, holder of the scroll of Earth, Hattori Hanzō (just like the famous ninja). The scrolls gives her great powers, and when the two scrolls will be reunited, they will open the door to Zipangu, the legendary heaven, where every wish can be granted.

== Characters ==
Hattori Hanzō
Hime, and last survivor, of the shinobi village; when the village was attacked, her father sealed the scroll of Earth within her, while the scroll of Heaven was stolen by Nobunaga's soldiers. The effect of the seal stopped her growth, so she appears like a young girl, but when the power of the scroll is used she reverts temporarily to her true age. It's revealed later in the story that the scrolls are artifacts from Zipangu, and that the shinobi were direct descendants of Zipangu's inhabitants.
Oda Nobunaga
The man who destroyed the shinobi village to take the scrolls and is after the princess to take the one he miss. It's revealed later in the story that the one acting as Nobunaga is no longer the original Nobunaga, but a powerful artifact from Zipangu, Adzuchi.
Juubei
A fat bird with a patch on his eye. He was once one of the shinobi, and Hanzō's tutor, but he died and was revived with the power of the scroll. He'll be the one to sacrifice his life in order to unseal the scrolls. Inspired by Yagyū Jūbei.
Sukesaburou
A bounty hunter, half-kijin, the demon race, and as such a descendant of Zipangu's people. He falls in love with the adult Hanzō, who he calls Tennyo (heavenly maiden), and follows her chibi form convinced that she's her younger sister. He has a human aspect, but can change to his demon form to fight.
Kakunoshin
A bounty hunter, with the power to wrap his blade in magical flames; he aims to be the strongest, and often trains with Hanzō (adult form). It's later revealed that he's the one once known as Nobunaga, and that he made his robot army as a way to stop wars, but his armies were stolen by Adzuchi, and he wanted to become the strongest in order to defeat Adzuchi. He's a descendant of Zipangu too.
Kotarou
A little child that the group meets near a hot spring; she says that her country was destroyed during the war and her parents were killed, but she heard that her siblings are alive and she's on a journey to find them. It's revealed later in the story that she was found by Doukichirou soon after the destruction of her village, and modified in a robot in which the scroll of Heaven was sealed, so she holds a power similar to that of Hanzō, but her power can take the form of a giant robot with the kanji ten (天; Heaven) on its chest.
Doukichirou
Once Nobunaga's right hand man, now Adzuchi's favourite pupil, he took up the role of controlling the machines until Adzuchi's fully awaken.
