= Ordinary Crush =

Japanese manga

- Cover of the first Japanese volume

わりとよくある男子校的恋愛事情 (Warito Yoku Aru Danshikōteki Ren'ai Jijō)
- Genre: School, Yaoi
- Manga
- Written by: Hyouta Fujiyama
- Published by: Frontier Works
- English publisher: NA: Digital Manga Publishing
- Original run: 2001 – 2003
- Volumes: 2

Ordinary Crush (Japanese: わりとよくある男子校的恋愛事情, Hepburn: Warito Yoku Aru Danshikōteki Ren'ai Jijō; lit. "The All-Boys School-Like Love Circumstances Good So Often") is a Japanese manga written and illustrated by Hyouta Fujiyama. It is licensed in North America by Digital Manga Publishing, which released the first volume through its imprint, Juné, on 22 August 2007, and the second volume on 5 December 2007.

== Plot ==
The series follows Kyota Haryana who finds out that the school's smartest and handsome upperclassmen, Haruta Kurishima, is in love with him when he suddenly kisses him on the lips after when they were assigned to help other students. At first Kyota can't help but feel uneasy by Haruta's advances towards him, but later he soon come to reciprocate his feelings and when he confessed to Haruta they shared a heartwarming kiss.

Later in the series it shows that Kyota and Haruta are living happily together married and have adopted a little girl.

== Reception ==
Mania Entertainment's Julie Rosato enjoyed the setting of Kinsei High (where 90% of the students are gay or bisexual) as a world where many stories could take place, and enjoyed Fujiyama's "gift of creating likeable, individual characters". Writing about the second volume, she felt that the question of who would be the seme was "dragged out too long", but enjoyed the conflict with Nanase's brother, a straight graduate of Kinsei High. Leia Weathington, writing for the appendix to Manga: The Complete Guide, felt the story "gets a bit tedious at times" but found it mostly fun with fitting art. Leroy Douresseaux, writing for Comic Book Bin, felt that the story's emphasis was on comedy rather than on being erotic. Holly Ellingwood, writing for Active Anime felt it was strange that there were no "truly villainous" characters in the manga, but she found this "adds that drop of melodrama", which she found satisfying. Katherine Farmar, writing for Comics Village, found Nanase to be quite believable in his cluelessness, by being "self-absorbed" for the most part, although she noticed he could be "so considerate" when he notices others. Farmar also found it refreshing that although other characters tried to break up the couple, they were unconcerned because they were "secure in each other's affections".
