= Kabuki (manga) =

Japanese manga series by Yukari Hashida

- Genre: Yaoi
- Manga
- Written by: Yukari Hashida
- Published by: Kaiousha
- English publisher: NA: Digital Manga Publishing
- Original run: 2004 – present
- Volumes: 5
- icon

Kabuki (カブキ, Kabuki) is a Japanese manga written and illustrated by Yukari Hashida. It is licensed in North America by Digital Manga Publishing, which released the first volume through its imprint June, on 9 September 2008, the second volume on 15 February 2010, and the third volume 23 February 2011.

== Plot ==
Kounosuke is the favored son of a noble family. When he is caught in a fire at the mansion, a blow to the head causes him to remember scenes from a previous life. A former Warring States Period daimyo, he had a torrid love affair with his page, Kageya. Kageya had sworn that when they were born again they would be together in the next life. But when Kounosuke wakes up, three men appear before him—all named Kageya! Can Kounosuke traverse time and be reunited again with his beloved Kageya?

== Reception ==
Leroy Dessaroux felt that Kabuki was a "supernatural romance", and enjoyed the "impressionistic" and "realistic" art, but felt that the tale lacked passion. Danielle Van Gorder felt that Hashida "was trying to do too many things" in the book and did not succeed at any of them, feeling that it was "forgettable".
