= Winter Cicada =

Japanese anime OVA series

- Fuyu no Semi
- Promotional image for Fuyu no Semi

冬の蝉
- Genre: Romance, Yaoi, Tragedy, Historical
- Original video animation
- Directed by: Yoshihisa Matsumoto
- Studio: VENET
- Licensed by: Media Blasters
- Released: February 23, 2007 – April 27, 2007
- Episodes: 3

Fuyu no Semi (冬の蝉) is a Japanese anime OVA loosely based on Youka Nitta's manga series Embracing Love (春を抱いていた, Haru o Daiteita).

The U.S. broadcast rights to the OVA have been licensed to Logo, MTV Networks' LGBT cable channel, and premiered on October 31, 2008.

== Synopsis ==
This three part yaoi story spans the war torn Meiji era when the Japanese turned from a Shogunate to Imperial rule and entered trade with the rest of the world (1862–1869). While the story unfolds historical dates and important figures are given while the characters give even more bits and pieces of this period during dialog.

Episode One: "Edo Love Song" starts in 1862, second year of the Bunkyuu Era, in Shinagawa Gotenyama during the Expulsion of Foreigners movement started by the Chōshū (Choushuu) clan of which Touma Kusaka is a member. Kusaka differs from his clan believing in peace and opening Japan up to foreigners where it can do trade and stand with equal footing on the world stage, the Open the Country movement. While trying to stop other Chōshū clan members from setting fire to the British Embassy, Kusaka is confronted by a Bakufu (Shogunate) samurai who helps him and a comrade, Aizawa, escape from the authorities.

Years later, while trying to find a school that will teach him English despite his clan's political stance, Kusaka once again meets the samurai who had saved his life. No longer in the employ of his Town Magistrate father, Keiichirou Akizuki goes to English school at the Nakahama Private School. Recognizing each other, Akizuki eventually offers to teach Kusaka English. Having been raised in an upper-class home, Akizuki takes pleasure in learning more about the common class lifestyle that Kusaka has always led while they learn English in secret as their clans cannot see them together without creating conflict. Despite their precautions, one of the Chōshū sees them and Kusaka has to stop meeting with Akizuki.

Episode Two: "Record of Ezo War" starts with Kusaka thinking about cutting ties with his clan when the Head Administrator, Sufu Masanosuke, offers to send him to London to learn about the West. Before leaving, Kusaka meets with Akizuki one last time during a sunset and they declare their love for each other by kissing and having passionate sweaty sex in a meadow near a riverbank. They consummate their relationship. While Kusaka is in England, Akizuki gains the leadership of his clan and its immediate association with the Shogun. After four years, Kusaka returns to Japan and receives a high ranking post in the Imperial army. It is during this time that Japan is in the midst of the greatest civil war Japan has known, the Boshin War, with Kusaka on the Satsuma-Chōshū (Imperial) side and Akizuki on the Bakufu (Shogunate) side. During one of the last battles, Kusaka finds Akizuki about to commit seppuku after having lost a leg to cannon fire. Upon being seen by one of his comrades aiding Akizuki, Kusaka kills the man, leaving his lover in shock.

Episode Three: "Tokyo Tragedy" starts four years later, with Kusaka working for the new government, wearing Western-style clothes and living in a Western-style home. In a private Japanese cottage behind the house, he keeps Akizuki in secret. Relations between the two lovers have broken down as Akizuki cannot stand being kept in hiding in comfort while his fellow Bakufu comrades suffer in prison, and he wants to commit suicide.

Eventually Aizawa, now an officer of the new law, discovers their relationship. He confronts Akizuki, leaving him with a tantō (short sword). A while later, it seems things between Kusaka and Akizuki are being patched up; yet a small group of police going through Kusaka's home, led by Aizawa, interrupts one of their moments. Kusaka runs back to the house, engages in a brief argument with his former comrade, and returns to the cottage only to find Akizuki missing and a suicide note on the futon pillow.

Akizuki pulls himself along the snow-covered ground, Aizawa's tantō in hand, stopping in front of a tree split into four trunks. After a brief reminiscing, he kills himself; Kusaka finds him a short while later. Opening the pouch around Akizuki's neck, he realizes that Akizuki was carrying around the shell of the cicada they had seen about eight years earlier. Kusaka takes the tantō from Akizuki's hand and commits suicide as well.

== Characters ==
- Touma Kusaka (草加 十馬, Kusaka Touma) - played by Youji Katou in Haru Wo Daiteita. Voiced by Shinichiro Miki (Japanese)
- Keiichirou Akizuki (秋月 景一郎, Akizuki Keiichiro) - played by Kyosuke Iwaki in Haru Wo Daiteita. Voiced by Toshiyuki Morikawa (Japanese)
- Masanoshin Aizawa (相沢 正之進, Aizawa Masanoshin) - Voiced by Showtaro Morikubo (Japanese)

== Media ==
Opening theme
"Kahyakkei" by NΛT ALLstars
Ending song
Fuyu no Semi" by Morikawa Toshiyuki
