= Boys' love fandom =

Fanbase of the homoerotic fiction genre

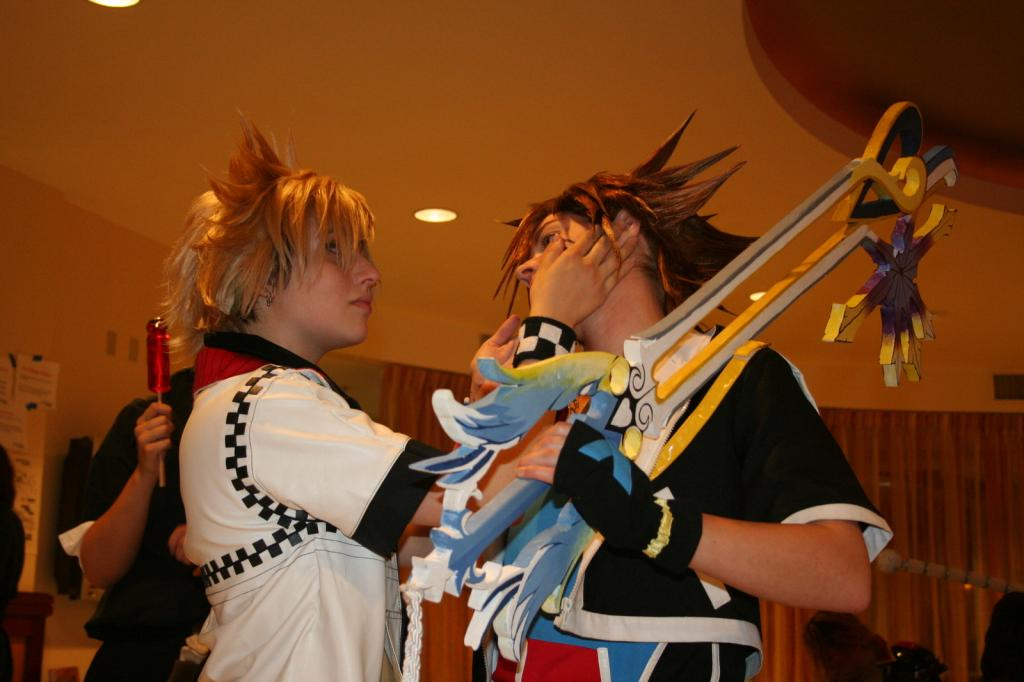
Two female cosplayers dressed as Roxas and Sora from Kingdom Hearts at Yaoi-Con in 2008

Boys' love (BL), a genre of male-male romance media originating in Japan that is created primarily by and for women, has a robust global fandom. Individuals in the BL fandom may participate in activities such as attending conventions, creating and/or posting to fansites, and creating fan works such as fan fiction and fan art.

In Japan, fans of BL are referred to as fujoshi (腐女子). Translating literally to "rotten woman" or "rotten girl", used by BL fans as a self-deprecating identity label. The term fudanshi (腐男子; lit. "rotten boy") later emerged to describe male fans of BL.

== Demographics ==
Most BL fans are either teenage girls or young women. The female readership in Thailand is estimated at 80%, and the membership of Yaoi-Con, a convention in San Francisco, is 85% female. It is usually assumed that all female fans are heterosexual, but in Japan there is a presence of lesbian manga authors and lesbian, bisexual, other or questioning female readers. Recent online surveys of English-speaking readers of BL indicate that 50-60% of female readers self-identify as heterosexual. It has been suggested that Western fans may be more diverse in their sexual orientation than Japanese fans and that Western fans are "more likely to link" BL ("Boy's Love") to supporting gay rights. Much like the BL readership base, the majority of BL fanfiction writers are also believed to be heterosexual women. The reasoning behind this trend is sometimes attributed to patriarchy- that women who write BL fanfiction are in fact acting out heterosexual fantasies through these male figures.

Although the genre is marketed at women and girls, men of all sexualities also form part of the readership. In one library-based survey of U.S. yaoi fans, about one quarter of respondents were male; online surveys of Anglophone readers place this percentage at about 10%. Lunsing suggests that younger Japanese gay men who are offended by gay men's magazines' "pornographic" content may prefer to read yaoi instead. That is not to say that the majority of homosexual men are fans of the genre, as some are put off by the feminine art style or unrealistic depictions of homosexual life and instead seek "Gei comi" (Gay comics), manga written by and for homosexual men, as gei comi is perceived to be more realistic. Lunsing notes that some of the narrative annoyances that homosexual men express about yaoi manga, such as rape, misogyny, and an absence of a Western-style gay identity, are also present in gei comi. Some male manga artists have produced yaoi works, using their successes in yaoi to then go on to publish gei comi.

Authors of BL present themselves as "fellow fans" by using dust jacket notes and postscripts to chat to the readers "as if they were her girlfriends" and talk about the creative process in making the manga and what she discovered she liked about the story she wrote.

=== Numbers ===
In the mid-1990s, estimates of the size of the Japanese yaoi fandom were at 100,000-500,000 people; at around that time, the long-running yaoi anthology June had a circulation of between 80,000 and 100,000, twice the circulation of the "best-selling" gay lifestyle magazine Badi. Most Western yaoi fansites "appeared some years later than pages and lists devoted to mainstream anime and manga". As of 1995, they "revolved around the most famous series", such as Ai no Kusabi and Zetsuai 1989; and by the late 1990s, English-speaking websites mentioning yaoi "reached the hundreds". As of 2003, on Japanese-language internet sites, there were roughly equal proportions of sites dedicated to yaoi as there were sites by and for gay men about homosexuality. On 16 November 2003, there were 770,000 yaoi websites. As of April 2005, a search for non-Japanese sites resulted in 785,000 English, 49,000 Spanish, 22,400 Korean, 11,900 Italian and 6,900 Chinese sites. In January 2007, there were approximately five million hits for 'yaoi'. Hisako Miyoshi, the vice editor-in-chief for Libre Publishing's manga division, said in a 2008 interview that although Boys Love is more well known to the general public, the number of readers remains limited, which she attributes to the codified nature of the genre.

=== Events ===
Event name	Status	Location	Years active	Notes
Ahn!Con	Inactive	Kansas City, Missouri, USA	2013-2016	
AiKon Bonn	Active	Bonn, Germany	2019-ongoing	
Bishie Con	Inactive	St. Louis, Missouri, USA	2009-2011	
BishounenCon	Inactive	Warwick, Rhode Island, USA	2017	
BLush	Active	Philippines	2012-ongoing	Formerly "Lights Out: Philippine Yaoi Convention"
Citrus Con	Active	Online		
Doki Doki City	Inactive	Mexico City, Mexico		
Flame Con	Active	New York City, New York, USA	2017-ongoing	
Fufu Fest	Inactive	Hermosillo, Sonora, Mexico	2019	
FujoCon	Inactive	Online	2020-2022	
FujoshiCon	Inactive	Chile	2015-2020	
La Mole	Active	Mexico City, Mexico		
Lights Out: Philippine Yaoi Convention	Inactive	Philippines	2003-2010	Reestablished as BLush in 2012
OOPS-Sommer Fest	Inactive	Mexico		
Yaoi-Con	Inactive	Santa Clara, California, USA	2001-2017	
Yaoi Expo	Inactive	Burbank, California, USA	2019	
Yaoi Expo PH	Active	Philippines		
Yaoi North	Active	Toronto, Ontario, Canada		Part of Anime North
Yaoithon	Active	Montreal, Quebec, Canada		Part of Otakuthon
YaYuCo	Active	Germany		
Y/Con	Active	France		

== Fan preferences ==
Thorn noted that while some fans like both equally, fans tend to either prefer BL or non-BL shōjo manga. and Suzuki noted BL fans have a preference for BL over other forms of pornography, for example, heterosexual love stories in ladies' comics. Jessica Bawens-Sugimoto feels that in general, "slash and yaoi fans are dismissive of mainstream hetero-sexual romance", such as "the notorious pulp Harlequin romances". Deborah Shamoon said that "the borders between yaoi, shōjo manga and ladies' comics are quite permeable", suggesting that fans of BL probably enjoyed both homosexual and heterosexual tales. Kazuma Kodaka, in an interview with Giant Robot, suggested that the Japanese yaoi fandom includes married women who had been her fans since they were in college. Dru Pagliassotti's survey indicates that loyalty to an author is a common factor in readers' purchase decisions. Yōka Nitta has noted a split in what her readers want - her younger readers prefer seeing explicit material, and her older readers prefer seeing romance. There is a perception that the English-speaking yaoi fandom is demanding increasingly explicit content, but that this poses problems for retailers. In 2004, ICv2 noted that fans seemed to prefer buying yaoi online. Andrea Wood suggests that due to restrictions placed on the sale of yaoi, many Western teenage fans seek more explicit titles via scanlations. Dru Pagliassotti notes that the majority of respondents to her survey say that they first encountered BL online, which she links to half of her respondents reporting that they get most of their BL from scanlations. In 2003, there were at least five BL scanlation groups. Japanese fan practices in the mid to late 2000s included the concept of the feeling of moe, which was typically used by male otaku about young female characters prior to this.

Robin Brenner and Snow Wildsmith noted in their survey of American fans that gay and bisexual male fans of yaoi preferred more realistic tales than female fans did.

Shihomi Sakakibara (1998) argued that yaoi fans, including himself, were homosexually oriented female-to-male transgender people. Akiko Mizoguchi believes there is a "shikou" (translated as taste or orientation), both towards BL/yaoi as a whole, and towards particular patterns within the genre, such as a "feisty bottom (yancha uke)" character type. Her study shows that fans believe that in order to be "serious" fans, they should know their own preferences, and "consider themselves a sort of sexual minority". She argues that the exchange of sexual fantasies between the predominantly female yaoi fandom can be interpreted to mean that although the participants may be heterosexual in real life, they can also and compatibly be considered "virtual lesbians". Patrick Galbraith suggests that androgynous beautiful boys contribute to the appeal of yaoi amongst women who are heterosexual, lesbian or transgender.

The small Taiwanese BL fandom has been noted to be against real-person BL fanfiction, banning it from their message board.

== Fujoshi and fudanshi ==
Fujoshi (腐女子; lit. "rotten girl") is a Japanese term for female fans of manga, anime and novels that feature romantic relationships between men. The label encompasses fans of the yaoi genre itself, as well as the related manga, anime and video game properties that have appeared as the market for such works has developed. The term "fujoshi" is a homophonous pun on fujoshi (婦女子), meaning "woman", created by replacing the character fu (婦) for woman, with the character fu (腐) for rotten. The name was coined by 2channel in the early 2000s, where it was used in a self-deprecating fashion. The term carries a sense of being a "fallen woman". An issue of Yureka which examined fujoshi in detail in 2007 contributed to the spread of the term.

Older fujoshi use various terms to refer to themselves, including as kifujin (貴腐人; "noble spoiled woman"), a pun on a homophonous word meaning "fine lady", and ochōfujin (汚超腐人), which sounds similar to a phrase meaning "Madame Butterfly", possibly taken from a character nicknamed Ochōfujin (お蝶夫人) in the 1972 manga series Ace o Nerae! by Sumika Yamamoto.

According to a 2005 issue of Eureka, in recent times fujoshi can refer to female otaku in general, although it cautions that not all yaoi fans are otaku, as there are some more casual readers. As fujoshi is the best-known term, it is often used by the Japanese media and by people outside of the otaku subculture to refer to female otaku as a group, regardless of whether they are fans of yaoi or not. This usage may be considered offensive by female otaku who are not yaoi fans.

In the contrary, men who enjoy the same media as fujoshis are referred to as fudanshi (腐男子; "rotten boy") or fukei (腐兄; "rotten older brother"), both of which are puns of similar construction to fujoshi. Bara manga author Gengoroh Tagame has said that men may choose a fudanshi label because it is more socially acceptable than coming out as gay. However, the sexual orientation of fudanshi is not necessarily gay, as heterosexuals also enjoy reading BL. There also exists a lesser known gender-neutral version used by nonbinary or x-gender people, fujin (腐人; "rotten/spoiled person").

Around 2020, fans began adopting the term "shipper" from English-speaking fandoms for its versatility, as it could be used for fan-preferred pairings of different genders.

=== As characters ===
Fujoshi and fudanshi are used as characters in mostly otaku-themed anime and manga, particularly those aimed at women. Popular titles include Tonari no 801-chan, My Girlfriend's a Geek, Kiss Him, Not Me, The High School Life of a Fudanshi, and Sasaki and Miyano. On the other hand, BL Metamorphosis and Princess Jellyfish, which both contained fujoshi characters and were aimed at a female audience, were praised for their female-centric view on the fujoshi subculture. A TV series featuring a policewoman who is a fujoshi, Fujoshi Deka, has been broadcast.

== Yaoi and slash ==
Besides commercially published original material, Japanese yaoi also encompasses fan-made dōjinshi, fan art, computer games, etc.; a large percentage of the dōjinshi offered at Comiket are yaoi stories based on popular anime and manga series. This may be seen as a parallel development to slash fiction in the West. Although shōjo manga stories featuring romances between boys or young men were commercially published in Japan from the mid-1970s, and soon became a genre in their own right, the spread of yaoi through the Western fan community is generally linked to the pre-existing Western slash fiction community. In the mid-1980s, fan translations of the shōjo manga series From Eroica with Love began to circulate through the slash community via amateur press associations, creating a "tenuous link" between slash and yaoi. Although the English-speaking online yaoi fandom is observed to increasingly overlap with online slash fandom, slash fiction has portrayed adult men, whereas yaoi follows the aesthetic of the beautiful boy, often highlighting their youth. Mark McLelland describes this aesthetic as being seen as problematic in recent Western society. Yaoi fans tend to be younger than slash fans, and so are less shocked about depictions of underage sexuality. Jessica Bauwens-Sugimoto detects a tendency in both yaoi and slash fandoms to disparage the others' heteronormativity, potential for subversiveness, or even the potential for enjoyment.

== See also ==
- Anime and manga fandom – Fan community
- Yaoi paddle – Novelty spanking paddle
- Fan loyalty – Loyalty felt and expressed towards object of fanaticism
- Fan service – Parts of a fictional work intended to please the audience
- Shipping (fandom) – Relationship created or desired by fans
- Otome Road – Area of Ikebukuro, Tokyo, Japan
