= Boys' Love Manga =

2010 manga anthology

- Cover artist: Heise
- Language: English
- Subject: Boys' love, boys' love fandom
- Genre: Academic
- Publisher: McFarland
- Publication date: 2010
- Publication place: United States
- Media type: Print (Paperback)
- Pages: 280 pp. softcover
- ISBN: 978-0-7864-4195-2

Boys' Love Manga: Essays on the Sexual Ambiguity and Cross-Cultural Fandom of the Genre is a 2010 anthology about boys' love (BL) and the boys' love fandom edited by Antonia Levi, Mark McHarry, and Dru Pagliassotti.

== Development ==
The title of the anthology was originally Girls Doing Boys Doing Boys: Japanese Boys' Love Anime and Manga in a Globalized World. Mark McHarry recounts that he attended Yaoi-Con in 2006 and met other scholars there. They decided to make a book together because of their interests in wanting to research and learn more about the genre and because the three editors are fans of the genre. The book largely focuses on the spread of BL in the West. The book does not contain any explicit illustrations as figures.

== Contents ==
The book is split into three parts with 14 chapters in total by various authors. The chapters are organized thematically into parts. Part One is called "Boys Love and Global Publishing", Part Two is called "Genre and Readership", and Part Three is called "Boys' Love and Perceptions of the Queer".

== Reception ==
Andrea Wood notes the variety of contributors to the volume and notes that the volume is uneven in its quality. She notes that some contributors say that Boys Love holds a similar appeal to romance novels and that some use "outdated" scholarship to differentiate BL from romance novels. Wood notes that there is little use of comics scholarship in the volume, and little discussion of individual works. She feels though that "most readers will be able to find something that appeals to them".

Nele Noppe feels that the book does not solely focus on "organized fandom but rather concentrate on reader involvement". Noppe notes that although the volume seems to lack a focus, that some points recur through the anthology, such as a comparison between slash fiction and boys' love, the sexual and gender identities of the BL fandom, why readers like BL, but noting that several chapters use surveys and responses of the fans themselves to avoid the "pathologization" that Noppe regards as common in studies of BL fans.

Noah Berlatsky "loathed" the book, feeling in general that it had an overcomplicated writing style, and needed to include more analysis of particular BL works. Shaenon K. Garrity found the quality of the work uneven but appreciated that "girlporn" was being discussed at an academic level, and reflected that several of the chapters became very "personal".

James Welker praises the depth of the work, and notes that many writers are also fans of the genre, giving an insider's perspective. He feels the volume may have been improved with a list of key authors and a timeline, as well as a more involved editing.

Suanne Roush describes the book as a discussion of various aspects of the genre, while noting that it is not a reader's advisory or a primer on exemplary titles. Roush recommends the books for public libraries with BL fans, interested librarians, or university libraries to supplement their coursework.
