= Embracing Love =

Japanese manga series

- Katou Youji and Iwaki Kyousuke

春を抱いていた (Haru o Daiteita)
- Genre: Drama, Romance, Yaoi
- Manga
- Written by: Youka Nitta
- Published by: Biblos
- English publisher: NA: SuBLime Be Beautiful (former)
- Magazine: Be × Boy Gold
- Original run: July 1997 – November 2009
- Volumes: 14
- Original video animation
- Directed by: Yoshikata Nitta
- Studio: Trinet Entertainment
- Released: March 31, 2005 – May 27, 2005
- Episodes: 2

Embracing Love (春を抱いていた, Haru o Daiteita) is a yaoi manga by Youka Nitta, it narrates the story about two male pornographic actors who fall in love as they attempt to break into mainstream acting. It was published in English by Be Beautiful Manga prior to Biblos's bankruptcy. In 2012, SuBLime Manga announced that they had licensed the series for an omnibus release. As of 2023, only the first 6 volumes have been released in North America. In addition to the manga, a drama CD and OVA have been released. Nitta chose to use the pornography industry as a backdrop because she felt it had potential, and she felt there was a parallel between how the pornography industry is marginalised in Japan and how boys love manga is marginalised within the manga industry.

== Plot ==
Life reflects art for Kyousuke Iwaki and Youji Katou, two adult film stars who are considering retirement from their sordid careers. However, when they're invited to audition for a new erotic film, they realize that this may be their last chance to achieve mainstream success. Unfortunately, things sour quickly when the director asks them to make love to each other and determine who will get the lead role. What follows next is romance, and passionate sex that will alter their careers.

== Characters ==
Kyousuke Iwaki: A reserved man who has put his work before his personal life. He has a strained relationship with his conservative family due to both his adult film career and his sexual orientation; which caused him to have some struggles in his relationship with Katou. Voiced by Toshiyuki Morikawa in the OVA.

Youji Katou: He is a blond, bold, outgoing, up-and-coming actor. His openness has brought him both good fortune and trouble. His relentless pursuit ultimately wins him Iwaki's love. He comes from a very open and understanding family that accept his choices and homosexual relationship with Iwaki. Voiced by Shinichiro Miki in the OVA.

Nagisa Sawa: The author of the novel "Haru wo Daiteita", who used to be a policeman from a conservative and controlling family but now dresses in female clothing. Voiced by Kazuhiko Inoue in the OVA.

Yukihito Sawa: Sawa Nagisa's younger cousin and lover. He witnessed his mother's death at the hands of his father when he was 13 falling in a severe state of shock that rendered him mute. Only Sawa's affections managed to pull him out of it but he's still shy and introverted. Voiced by Chihiro Suzuki in the OVA.

Kazunari Urushizaki: Katou's stalker who looks like a younger Iwaki, he becomes a reporter to better follow Katou. Voiced by Kentarou Itou in the OVA.

Katsuya Kikuchi: An actor who some years ago had a same-sex relationship scandal, he is jealous of the positive public reaction to Iwaki and Katou's relationship. Voiced by Ken Narita in the OVA.

== Publication ==
Haru wo Daiteita was published in Japan by Biblos until its bankruptcy in 2006, when the series was picked up by Libre Publishing. Haru wo Daiteita was published in English by Central Park Media under its label Be Beautiful, in an agreement with Biblos, as Embracing Love. In 2007 following Biblos's bankruptcy, Libre published an open letter on their website which said that English-language publishers had to renegotiate publishing rights for Biblos's former series with Libre, specifically naming CPM's releases as "illegal".

In July 2008, Youka Nitta traced a magazine ad and used the drawing as the cover for chapter 49 of Haru wo Daiteita, as a result the series was pulled from the next issue of BeXBoy Gold, Nitta declined to attend Yaoi-Con, and Libre removed mentions of her and her work from their website, Nitta saying that she will quit manga work. The ad company who created the ad that was traced released a statement saying that they consider Nitta's tracing of their ad to be "a tribute".

In June 2009, Libre announced that Nitta had finished drawing Haru wo Daiteita and that the fourteenth and final volume would be released in autumn. It was released in November 2009, selling 24,078 copies in the first week. The final volume is available on Amazon Kindle.

== Media ==
=== Manga ===
Haru wo Daiteita was serialized in Be × Boy Gold from July 1997 until November 2009 and was collected into tankōban volumes by Biblos up to volume 11, and Libre Publishing from volumes 12 through 14. Libre Publishing re-released volumes 1–11 as e-books only.

A sequel series titled Haru wo Daiteita: Alive was launched in Be × Boy Gold in 2013.

==== Embracing Love ====
No.	Original release date	Original ISBN	English release date	English ISBN
1	April 10, 1999 (Biblos); December 7, 2012 (Libre)	978-4-88-271961-8	August 13, 2013 (SuBLime)	978-1-4215-5573-7
Ch. 1. "Embracing Love"; Ch. 2. "Focus Flash"; Ch. 3. "Flesh Flute"; Ch. 4. "One-Season Porno"; Ch. 5. "Imitation Room"; Bonus. "Leap Over the Fence"
2	January 10, 2000 (Biblos); December 7, 2012 (Libre)	978-4-88-271998-4	August 13, 2013 (SuBLime)	978-1-4215-5573-7
Ch. 6. "Selfish Gene"; Ch. 7. "One Night Gigolo"; Ch. 8. "Family Tree"; Ch. 9. "Reason for Living"; Ch. 10. "Nude Dancer"
3	December 10, 2000 (Biblos); May 9, 2014 (Libre)	978-4-83-521139-8	March 11, 2014 (SuBLime)	978-1-4215-5904-9
Ch. 11. "Paradox Dogs"; Ch. 12. "Innocent Vamp"; Ch. 13. "Always"; Ch. 14. "First Cry (Part 1)"; Ch. 15. "First Cry (Part 2)"
4	June 10, 2001 (Biblos); May 9, 2014 (Libre)	978-4-83-521205-0	March 11, 2014 (SuBLime)	978-1-4215-5904-9
Ch. 16. "Equality Lover"; Ch. 17. "Cross Game"; Ch. 18. "Inside Report"; Ch. 19. "His Best"; Ch. 20. "Mother's Rouge"
5	January 10, 2002 (Biblos); July 22, 2014 (Libre)	978-4-83-521300-2	August 11, 2015 (SuBLime)	978-1-4215-6456-2
Ch. 21. "Silent Killer"; Ch. 22. "Asleep or Awake"; Ch. 23. "Always Asking for the Moon"; Ch. 24. "Winter Cicada"
6	August 10, 2002 (Biblos); August 26, 2014 (Libre)	978-4-83-521367-5	August 11, 2015 (SuBLime)	978-1-4215-6456-2
Ch. 25. "Linkage Map"; Ch. 26. "Even Past the Time for Dreaming"; Ch. 27. "Love Symbol"; Ch. 28. "Heaven and Earth (Part 1)"; Ch. 29. "Heaven and Earth (Part 2)"; Ch. 30. "Kiss of Fire"
7	February 10, 2003 (Biblos); March 31, 2015 (Libre)	978-4-83-521419-1	–	—
Ch. 31. "Charcoal Filter"; Ch. 32. "Clear and Present Danger"; Ch. 33. "99.9999"; Ch. 34. "Double Casting"; Ch. 35. "Air Castle"
8	September 10, 2003 (Biblos); June 18, 2015 (Libre)	978-4-83-521494-8	–	—
Ch. 36. "Film Paddock"; Ch. 37. "Unlocked Cellar"; Ch. 38. "Trickster"; Ch. 39. "Noise Reduction"; Ch. 40. "Waterproof"; Ch. 41. "Underwear"; Ch. 42. "EISWEIN"
9	September 10, 2004 (Biblos); August 20, 2015 (Libre)	978-4-83-521651-5	–	—
10	May 10, 2005 (Biblos); August 11, 2016 (Libre)	978-4-83-521747-5	–	—
11	February 10, 2006 (Biblos); October 13, 2016 (Libre)	978-4-83-521863-2	–	—
12	February 10, 2007 (Libre)	978-4-86-263122-0	–	—
13	March 10, 2008 (Libre)	978-4-86-263365-1	–	—
14	November 10, 2009 (Libre)	978-4-86-263709-3	–	—

==== Embracing Love: Alive ====
No.	Japanese release date	Japanese ISBN
1	March 10, 2014 (Libre)	978-4-79-971456-0
2	July 10, 2015 (Libre)	978-4-79-972608-2
3	May 10, 2016 (Libre)	978-4-79-972947-2
4	June 9, 2017 (Libre)	978-4-79-973352-3
5	June 9, 2018 (Libre)	978-4-79-973864-1
6	June 10, 2020 (Libre)	978-4-79-974811-4

=== OVA ===
The OVA Haru wo Daiteita, otherwise known as Embracing Love, has two episodes (30 minutes long).

== Reception ==
The refreshing "reversible" nature of the couple has been praised, and it is thought that this is the first series to be published in English which has a reversible couple. The conceit of both characters being pornographic actors has been described as being unusual in yaoi. The interspersion of humour and everyday life in the series has been praised, as has the "honesty of the emotions" in the work. Iwaki's continuing refusal to have sex with men has been seen as odd, given his profession. By volume 3, the art style has "softened", described as being reflective of the softening of the characters. Julie Rosato has criticised the production values of CPM's release of volume 4. The series has been called "gloriously porntastic". An artbook was published by CPM in English, the production values were praised, and the English edition was described as an "absolutely worthy substitute" for the original Japanese artbook. The structuring of the OVA episodes has been criticised, as "it's not exactly clear what time period we're watching." The OVA episodes have been said to be "quite tame", as no genitalia are visible.

== See also ==
- Winter Cicada
