= White Brand =

Japanese Manga

- White Brand by Youka Nitta, as published by Digital Manga Publishing.

ホワイトブランド (Howaito Burando)
- Genre: Yaoi
- Manga
- Written by: Youka Nitta
- Published by: Houbunsha
- English publisher: NA: Digital Manga Publishing
- Published: November 1998
- Volumes: 1

White Brand (ホワイトブランド, Howaito Burando) is a one-shot Japanese manga written and illustrated by Youka Nitta. It is also a manga anthology containing non-related stories. It is licensed in North America by Digital Manga Publishing, which released the manga through its yaoi imprint, Juné, on December 2, 2008.

== Reception ==
Coolstreak Comics' Leroy Douresseaux comments on the manga's stories, saying, "The White Brand stories, with their actually shocking depiction of prejudice based upon skin color, are by far the best of this collection. Nitta tries to get inside the heads of Izuru and Keshiki, and she doesn't mind delving into emotional pain and digging up the past. The other stories are also good. "Hasta La Vista, Baby", is poorly conceived and developed, but the presence of a toddler makes it a better than expected read. "Teal End" is about an American expatriate and apprentice artist trying to prove that he belongs in a small Japanese town. Meanwhile, his master's son lusts after him; it's a good story that deserves to be its own graphic novel. ActiveAnime's Rachel Bentham comments that her favourite story was "the one about an upcoming painting exhibit, a handsome and mysterious drifter, and a lonely rich heir in danger. This story had mystery, suspense, and action. There was even a bit of crime drama! It was cool and I liked the mystique around the dark lover".
