= The Prime Minister's Secret Diplomacy =

Japanese manga

公使閣下の秘密外交 (Koushi Kakka no Himitsu Gaikou)
- Genre: Yaoi
- Manga
- Written by: Youka Nitta
- Published by: Taiyoh Tosho
- English publisher: NA: 801 Media
- Published: December 27, 2006

The Prime Minister's Secret Diplomacy (公使閣下の秘密外交, Koushi Kakka no Himitsu Gaikou) is a one-shot Japanese manga written and illustrated by Youka Nitta. It is licensed in North America by 801 Media in January 2008.

== Reception ==
Patricia Beard felt that Nitta's research into international diplomacy made the manga much more interesting, and she also enjoyed the atypical characterisation of Yoshinaga. Holly Ellingwood felt that the manga was Nitta's "best storytelling and artistry to date" Leroy Douresseaux praised Nitta's "attention to detail". In a poll at About.com, the manga was ranked fourth "Best New Boy's Love Manga" of 2008.
