= Spanking paddle =

Implement used to strike the buttocks

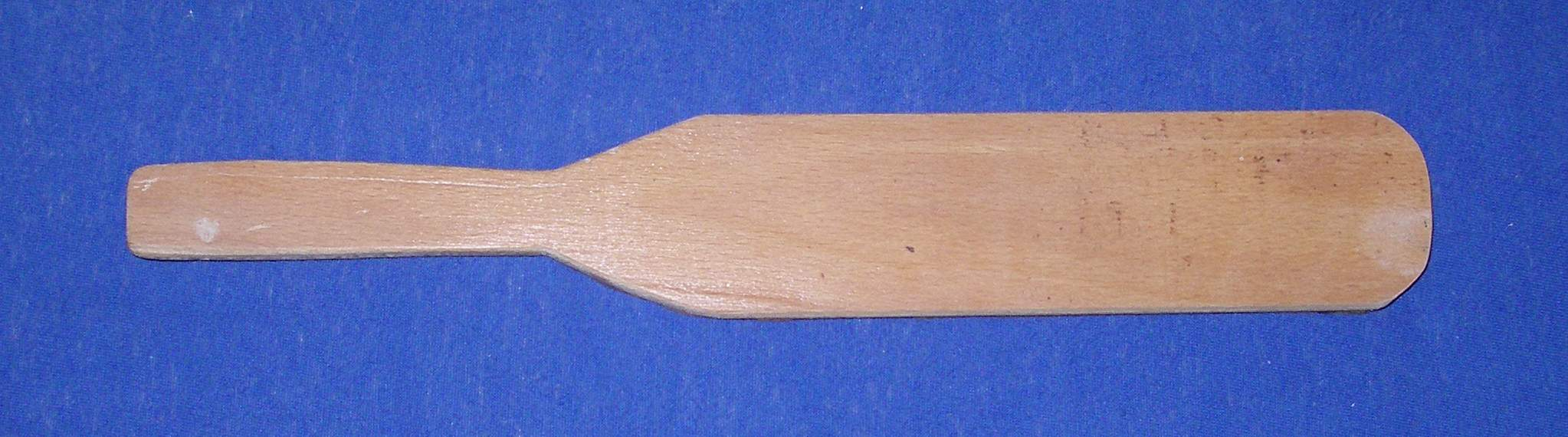
A spanking paddle

A spanking paddle is an implement used to strike a person on the buttocks. The act of spanking a person with a paddle is known as "paddling". A paddling may be for punishment (normally of a student at school in the United States), for fun (non-erotic or erotic), or as an initiation or hazing ritual. In the great majority of cases, the paddle is aimed at the recipient's buttocks; less commonly, the back of the thighs might also be targeted. The sensation from the impact of a paddle is a sharp sting that quickly transitions to a deep ache.

== Description ==
A paddle has two parts: a handle and a blade. Paddles come in various materials (though are usually and traditionally made from wood), shapes, sizes, and weights - factors that can influence the intensity of their impact and thus the sensation for the recipient of the paddling. The surface is typically smooth, although some may be perforated by having holes drilled into them - purportedly increasing intensity as there is less air drag when the paddle approaches the buttocks. Blade are often long enough to simultaneously impact both cheeks of the buttocks. The blade is typically 1/4-inch thick, 3 to 4 inches (100 mm) wide, and 1 to 3 feet (0.91 m) in length. Most paddles are designed to be held with one hand, but a giant paddle may be designed to be held with two hands.

Paddles for use in schools are made of wood, or occasionally plastic. Paddles used for school punishments may be roughly hewn from commonly available wood. The paddles used for fraternity and sorority initiation ceremonies are often professionally made and engraved with organizational symbols and slogans.

== History of the paddle ==
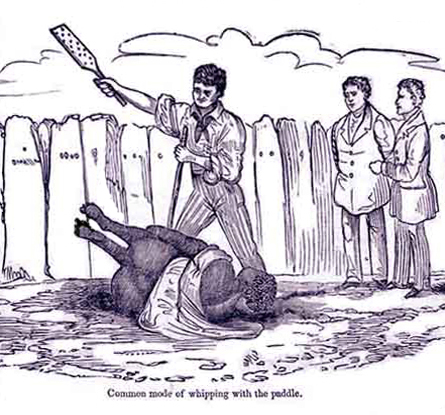
Illustration of a paddle being used for the punishment of slaves.

The paddle may have been originally invented for the punishment of enslaved people as a way of causing intense pain without doing any permanent damage to the recipient. However it is not only in former slave states that the paddle has been used in schools. It is not known why or exactly when it became the normal implement for corporal punishment in US schools. There are, however, instances of paddling using similar implements with individuals who were not slaves.

== Scope of use ==
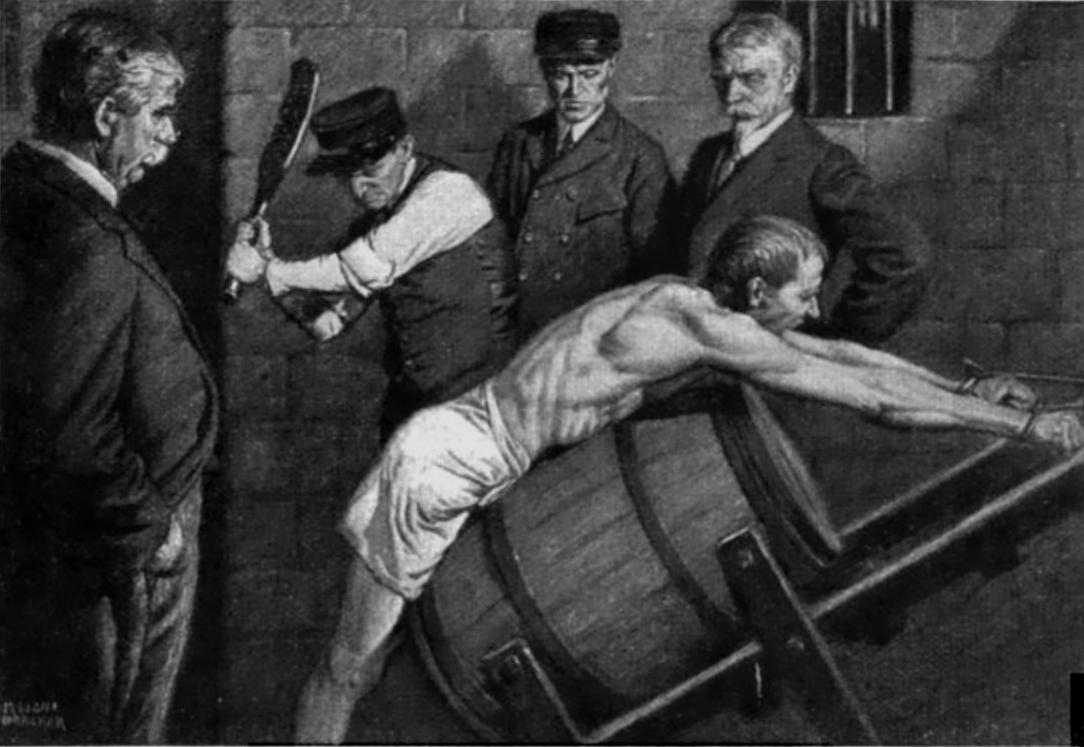
1912 illustration of an inmate being punished in an American prison.

Paddling was mainly used in many parts of the United States (and still is, in a few areas) as a means to discipline misbehaving school students. Paddling has also been used in some homes to punish children and teenagers. The results of a national household survey indicate that paddling is a discipline technique that 10% of parents are "very likely to use". The percentage of parents who say that they are very likely to paddle increases to 12% when involving teenagers.

=== Paddling as punishment in U.S. schools ===
The paddle is the almost invariable implement in US schools that still allow corporal punishment for student misconduct. Some paddles have traditionally had holes bored in them for aerodynamic effect, but many schools nowadays prohibit the use of such paddles.

Paddling typically causes a slight reddening of the skin but in some cases can cause bruises that are "visible for approximately two weeks". Whether or not particular bruises constitute evidence of "serious injury" or "abuse" or "child maltreatment" depends on individual circumstances and can ultimately be settled only by a court of law.

There have been cases in the past when paddling was administered incorrectly or excessively. Partly in order to avoid this danger, in the majority of U.S. schools, paddling is more strictly regulated than in the past, many schools publishing detailed rules in their student handbooks. It is usually a requirement that a professional witness be present. Currently, there is often a maximum of three swats (or "licks" or "pops"). In the past, paddlings of up to 30 licks were not unknown, especially in rural schools. Practice has gradually moved from paddlings in the classroom or hallway to paddlings administered out of the sight of other students, typically in the principal's office. "Hallway" paddlings could typically be seen by other students, administrators or even outsiders visiting the school.

In 1981, a 17-year-old student claimed bleeding wounds as a result of a school paddling. It was alleged that the assistant principal who had administered the punishment had held and swung the paddle with two hands. In order to prevent such claims, a school district currently may choose to require the handle of a spanking paddle to be "just large enough for a normal one-hand grip". Or a rule might provide that the handle shall not be more than 4 inches (100 mm) long (just large enough to be held with one hand).

In 1982, a nine-year-old student was hit with a wooden paddle that was cracked. This caused a bleeding wound that became a permanent scar. To avoid this, nowadays some school districts have adopted rules which prohibit using paddles that have cracks in them. For example, the policies of Bloomfield School District provide that, "Corporal punishment will be administered by spanking the buttocks of a student with a flat-surfaced paddle which is smoothly sanded and has no cracks or holes and that will cause no more than temporary pain and not inflict permanent damage to the body."

A paddling is typically administered with two or more school employees present. The student may be ordered to bend over a chair or desk and, in that position, receive the prescribed number of strokes of the paddle. Paddling usually occurs in an office but may sometimes occur in a hallway. The punishment is delivered across the seat of the student's trousers or skirt.

In order to avoid allegations of sexual abuse, many school districts require that a female teacher be present during the paddling of a female student. A school might also recommend "that female staff members administer corporal punishment to female students (middle and high school)." Or a school board might prescribe that a "female principal(s) or designee shall spank or paddle female students" and that a "male principal(s) or designee shall spank or paddle male students."

As of April 2023, 17 states allow corporal punishment in public schools. See School corporal punishment in the United States for further information.

In some US schools students make paddles themselves as a part of their woodworking (“shop”) class.

=== Social discipline ===
- Some university or college traditions enforce(d) rules by paddling offenders. In the University of Missouri until World War II, any freshman found on the 'quad', the most prestigious square on campus, had to offer his 'insolent' posterior for punishment along a "paddle line" formed by swatting seniors.
- Fraternities and sororities are commonly associated with paddling of members, especially new members or pledges, as part of their hazing rituals. Due to modern anti-hazing laws and regulations, this has declined. This subculture is peculiar to North America.

=== Other play and traditions ===
The paddle is also a favorite implement for non-disciplinary "fun" spankings such as "birthday spankings," as also for paddle games (such as trading blows) or a spanking pyramid or paddle machine. A paddle machine can be used in conjunction with a spanking bench. Numerous celebrities, including Jessica Jaymes, Jennifer Krum, Haydn Porter, Tabitha Stevens and Victoria Zdrok, have mounted Howard Stern's spanking bench to be paddled by his paddle machine, the "Robospanker". Paddles are also used by practitioners of erotic spanking.

== See also ==
- Caning
- Strapping
- Yaoi paddle
- Ping-pong paddle
