= Tomoi (manga) =

Japanese manga series

- Cover of the collected bunkobon edition, featuring Hisatsugu Tomoi
- Genre: Drama, yaoi
- Created by: Wakuni Akisato
- Manga

Nemureru Mori no Binan & Tomoi
- Written by: Wakuni Akisato
- Published by: Shogakukan
- Imprint: PF Comics
- Magazine: Petit Flower
- Original run: 1985 – 1986
- Volumes: 2

Tomoi (stylized in all caps) is a Japanese manga series written and illustrated by Wakuni Akisato. It was originally serialized in two parts, respectively titled Nemureru Mori no Binan (眠れる森の美男; lit. "Sleeping Beauty Boy") and Tomoi, in the manga magazine Petit Flower from 1985 to 1986. Set in the early 1980s in the context of the HIV/AIDS epidemic in New York City, the series follows the life of Hisatsugu Tomoi, a gay Japanese doctor living in New York. The series is the first Japanese literary work in any medium to depict HIV/AIDS, and is noted by critics for its influence on the yaoi (male-male romance) genre of manga.

== Plot ==
Hisatsugu Tomoi defies his father's wishes to take over the family business to instead become a doctor, and in 1982 leaves his native Japan to complete his residency at a hospital in New York City. He realizes his homosexuality after immersing himself in the city's gay culture and begins a relationship with Richard Stein, a promiscuous German doctor. The hospital begins seeing an increasing number of gay male patients with an unknown affliction later determined to AIDS; after one of Stein's ex-lovers dies from the virus, he ends his relationship with Tomoi and returns to Germany.

Tomoi travels home to Japan, where he rebuffs pressure from his parents to enter an arranged marriage and is spurned by a male childhood friend who he unsuccessfully attempts to seduce. He returns to New York and begins a relationship with Marvin Williams, a kind ophthalmologist at the hospital who is afflicted with AIDS, and whom he eventually weds in a commitment ceremony. Williams' spiteful ex-wife refuses to grant him a formal divorce, and when she later attempts to kill Tomoi by shooting him, Marvin jumps into the line of fire and dies from the gunshot. Heartbroken, Tomoi travels to Afghanistan to volunteer as a combat medic for the Mujahideen amid the Soviet–Afghan War, where he is ultimately killed in an air strike.

== Release ==
Tomoi was originally serialized in Petit Flower, a manga magazine aimed at women between the age of 18 and 23, from 1985 to 1986. The series was released in two parts, respectively titled Nemureru Mori no Binan (眠れる森の美男; lit. "Sleeping Beauty Boy") and Tomoi. Both parts were later published as collected volumes by Shogakukan under their PF Comics imprint.

== Themes and analysis ==
Tomoi has received scholarly attention as a representative example of both the thematic depth of shōjo manga (girls' manga) and its ability to engage with political subject material. Manga critic Frederik L. Schodt notes in his 1996 book of criticism Dreamland Japan that a story about gay men and the AIDS crisis being published in a magazine aimed at women rather than men "is not as odd as it may seem, given the long tradition in girls' manga of soap-operatic stories romanticizing gay love, especially in overseas settings". The appeal of male-male romance manga (alternately referred to as yaoi, shōnen-ai, or "boys' love") to the shōjo manga audience has been linked to the lack of representation of female sexual agency in Japanese pop culture, and to social pressures against expressions of female Japanese sexuality.

Manga scholar Fusami Ogi notes that though Tomoi is male, he embodies traits typical of a shōjo manga protagonist through character attributes that "emphasize his femininity and passivity", such as his desire for a fated romance with a Prince Charming-like figure and his initial general ignorance of AIDS. In the latter case, Ogi argues that Tomoi's ignorance of AIDS mirrors that of the general public of the 1980s – Tomoi was written and published at a time when there was little public awareness of the virus in Japan, with the country reporting its first AIDS case in 1985, the same year Tomoi began serialization.

== Reception and legacy ==
=== Critical response ===
Frederik L. Schodt praises Akisato's writing, arguing that while a direct description of the plot of the series "makes [Tomoi] sound depressing, melodramatic, and even downright corny", the author "tenderly illustrates" the story and "includes many gags and much humorous banter". Schodt offers particular praise for Akisato's "uncontrived and sensitive" depiction of gay male life, and the manner in which she "deftly weaves" information on AIDS into the story. Manga scholar Wim Lunsing similarly notes the "plausible and realistic" treatment of gay male life, "except for the rather farfetched end."

=== Impact ===
Tomoi contains the first depiction of HIV/AIDS in any literary medium in Japan.

The series additionally represented a significant shift for male-male romance manga away from the melodramas and schoolboy romances that had previously defined the genre and towards new expressions in plot, setting, mood, and characterization. Works began to depict older protagonists, shifting from "beautiful boys" (bishōnen) to men in general, including "beautiful youths" (biseinen) and "beautiful men" (binan). The genre also began to depict sex more graphically, contrasting the romanticized sex scenes of the 1970s and early 1980s. Male-male romance manga also began to trend towards realism in both plot and setting, shifting from romanticized historical and fantasy settings to unidealized contemporary settings, or which were otherwise familiar to a contemporary Japanese audience.
