= Nariko Enomoto =

Japanese manga artist (born 1967)

- Born: Tokyo, Japan
- Areas: Manga author, manga critic

Nariko Enomoto (榎本ナリコ) (born November 5, 1967) is a Japanese manga author and manga critic who uses this name for children's and women's magazines. She writes under the pen name Nobi Nobita (野火ノビタ) for Boys' Love and doujinshi, as well as for critical works. She made her professional debut in 1997 with Season of Sentiment (センチメントの季節), published by Shogakukan. She graduated from the Faculty of Letters at Kokugakuin University. Furthermore, she won a special award in the Sense of Gender Awards in 2003 with her work The Four Hundred Blows (大人は判ってくれない―野火ノビタ批評集成).

== Works ==
=== As Nariko Enomoto ===
- Season of Sentiments (8 volumes) - Serialized in Big Comic Spirits, Shogakukan (Big Spirits Comics Special) from 1997 to 2001. Published in Shogakukan Bunko (4 volumes) in 2005. This is her debut work and her most famous work.
- Mysterious Jiji Girl - 1999, Homesha (Eyes comics) serialized in Shueisha's shojo manga magazine "Eyes" (out of print), 2010, Ichijinsha DNA Comics (new edition, 1 volume)
- Where the Power Lies (2 volumes) - 2002–2003, serialized in Futabasha's (Action Comics) Manga Action, 2010, Ichijinsha DNA Comics (new edition 2 volumes)
- Skirt - 2002, Shogakukan (Big Spirits Comics Special) "Big Comics Spirits Extra Edition" serialization
- Nariko Enomoto + Nobi Nobita (3 volumes) - 2002, Futabasha (Action Comics) (a collection of derivative works and original works published in doujinshi)
  1. Derivative works (Neon Genesis Evangelion)
  2. Derivative work (Yu Yu Hakusho)
  3. Original works (boys' love works, etc.)
- "Dreaming Heart" Once More - Published in Shueisha's "YOU" No. 20, 2003 (one-shot)
- Home Drama - 2003, Shueisha (Queens Comics) "YOU" short serialization
- Poetry collection - 2005, Shogakukan (Big Comics Special) "Big Comics Spirits Special Edition Yamada" 2-5 issues, "Big Comics Spirits Special Edition Mangasen"
- Kokoro - 2005, Shogakukan (Big Spirits Comics Special) serialized in Big Comics Superior (a modern-day manga adaptation of Natsume Sōseki's novel)
- Ribbon RE-BORN - 2003–2004, Shogakukan (Big Comics) (serialized in Big Comics Spirits Special Edition Mangasen and Big Comics Spirits Special Edition Casual)
- My Unkind Senpai - 2005, Hekitensha (Cover illustration only, author: Hibichi )
- Wind Guardian (2 volumes) 2005–2007, Kodansha X Bunko White Heart, (illustrations and writing: Shido Hisaki)
- Fable Allegoria - 2006, Futabasha (Action Comics), 2010, Ichijinsha DNA Comics (new edition, 1 volume)
- Where Eien Lives - 2006, Shueisha (Queens Comics)
  - The Place Where Eternity Lives (Part 1 and Part 2)
  - The Light of the Stars is the Light of the Past (Episode 1, Episode 2, Final Episode)
- How to Walk Through Time - 2007–2013, serialized in Nemuki, published by Asahi Shimbun Publications (Strange Stories for Sleepless Nights Comics)
- World Uniform - Serialized in Shogakukan's (Sunday GX Comics) Monthly Sunday Gene-X from 2008 to 2009
- The Ark of Saint Moes - serialized in Shogakukan's (Sunday GX Comics) Monthly Sunday Gene-X from 2009 to 2013
- Girl Golem - 2015, Asahi Shimbun Publications' Nemuki+ September 2015 issue (a one-shot that became the basis for "Girl Golem and the Weirdos in the Science Lab")
- Girl Golem and the Weirdos in the Science Lab - 2016–2017, serialized in Asahi Shimbun Publications' Nemuki+ comics
- Sentiment's Destination (3 volumes published) - 2017~, Gentosha Comics (Birds Comics) Monthly Birds → "Comic Boost (formerly Denshi Birds)" serialization (successor to "Sentiment's Season")

=== As Nobi Nobita ===
- Flying Boys - 1995, Ohta Publishing (a collection of parodies of derivative works (Yu Yu Hakusho))
- HAPPY UNDER LIFE - 1995, Hikari Publishing (Breath Comics)
- Haruo Sagrada Familia - 1996, Ohta Publishing
- If You'll Hold Me - 1997, Byblos (Super Be-Boy comics)
- The Return of the Kidnapper - 1997, Byblos (Zero comics)
- Shadow on Your Face - 2005, Byblos (Be-Boy comics)
- I've been watching you for a long time - 2011, Libre Publishing (Be-Boy comics)
