= The Harrow =

- Editor-in-chief: Dru Pagliassotti
- Categories: Fantasy and Horror
- Frequency: Monthly
- Publisher: Dru Pagliassotti
- Founded: 1998
- First issue: January 1998
- Final issue: 2009
- Country: United States
- Based in: Thousand Oaks, CA
- Language: English
- Website: http://theharrow.com
- ISSN: 1528-4271

The Harrow was an online magazine for fantasy and horror fiction, poetry, and reviews, launched in January 1998 by founder and editor-in-chief Dru Pagliassotti. The magazine has an all-volunteer editorial staff and reviewer pool and uses a double blind review system that provides authors with individualized feedback on their submissions.

In 2008, The Harrow was published on the first of each month using Open Journal Systems software. From 2009, The Harrow staff are taking a break and the journal is not in production at the moment.

== Awards and recognition ==
The Harrow has placed within the top 10 in the Preditors and Editors Best Fiction Magazines/E-Zines poll every year since 2003.

Pieces first published in the magazine have received recognition in several other venues. First-place Harrow contest winner "Harming Obsession" by Bev Vincent received an honorable mention in The Year's Best Fantasy & Horror (16th Ed.); "The Pickup", a short story by Jim Schutte was a 2005 nominee for the Gaylactic Spectrum Award. M. Frost's poem, "Removing the Bloodstain", from the November 2006 issue was reprinted in the March 2007 newsletter from the Horror Writers Association.

Well-known authors published in The Harrow include Gemma Files, Peter Crowther and Marlys Pearson. Editor Pagliassotti's fantasy novel, Clockwork Heart, was published by Juno Books in March 2008. Other authors published in The Harrow who also have novels or collections out include Brian Ames and Chris Howard.

== Anthologies ==
In 2006, The Harrow produced Fear of the Unknown, published by Echelon Press, with an introduction by Chelsea Quinn Yarbro and including stories by Poppy Z Brite, Owl Goingback and Jack Ketchum. In 2007, it followed up with Midnight Lullabies, published by The Harrow Press, with an introduction by Tim Wynne-Jones.
