= Yaoi paddle =

Novelty spanking paddle

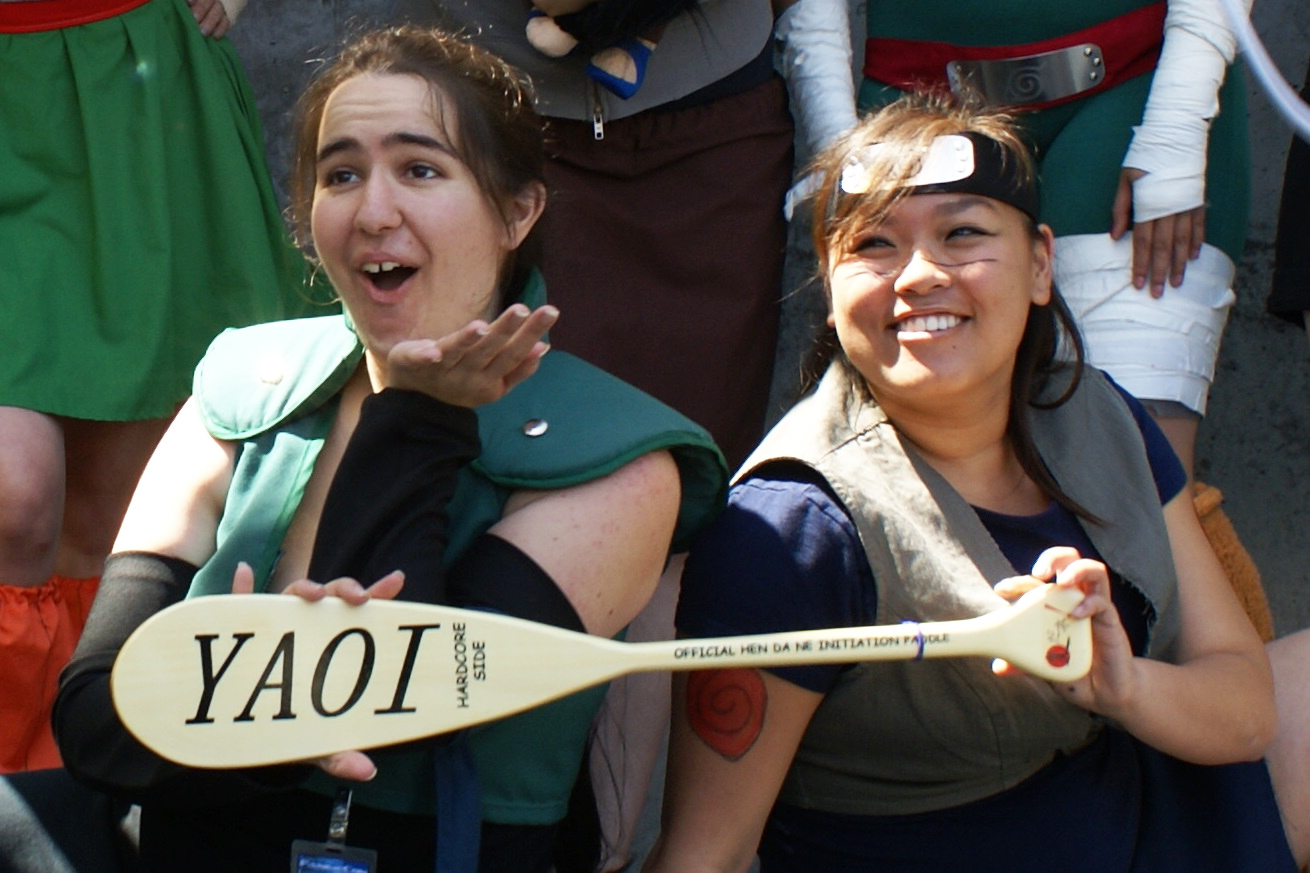
Two cosplayers holding a yaoi paddle at Fanime in 2007

A yaoi paddle is a wooden spanking paddle emblazoned with the word yaoi, a term for a genre of male–male romance media originating in Japan. The paddles are a novelty item that were sold primarily at Western anime conventions in the 2000s, where they were used by attendees as props for cosplay and photo ops. Others used the paddles to spank cosplayers and attendees, sometimes non-consensually; by the early 2010s, their possession and sale had been banned by most conventions due to their misuse for harassment and as weapons. In 2022, a crowdfunding campaign to re-manufacture and distribute yaoi paddles was the subject of an intellectual property dispute.

== Description and history ==
Yaoi paddles were first manufactured in the mid-2000s by Hen Da Ne, a vendor selling hentai and yaoi doujinshi (self-published pornographic manga) at western anime conventions. The paddles were sold at conventions by the vendor and online by Yaoi-Manga.com, a yaoi imprint of Digital Manga Publishing. By 2005 the companies were selling an "upgraded" version of the yaoi paddle, featuring "a more aerodynamic shape", a lacquer finish, and laser engraved text. Hen Da Ne estimated in 2022 the total number of yaoi paddles the company produced to be "in the hundreds".

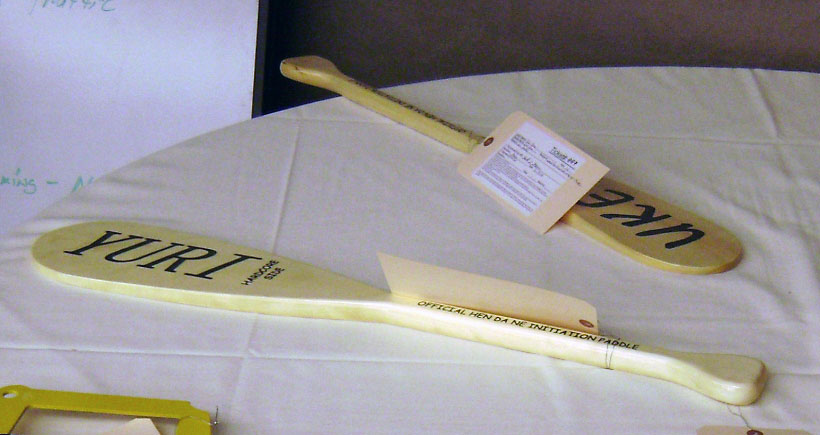
Variants of the yaoi paddle reading yuri and uke

The pine wood paddles are emblazoned with "Yaoi Softcore Side" on one side of the blade and "Yaoi Hardcore Side" on the other, and "Official Hen Da Ne Initiation Paddle" on the handle; paddles sold through Yaoi-Manga.com featured the company's logo on the pommel. Variants of the yaoi paddle reading "yuri" (a term for female–female romance media), "seme", and "uke" (terms respectively designating the top and bottom in a yaoi relationship) were also produced. The paddles measured 2 feet by 5.25 inches, and retailed for between US$30 and $40.

Yaoi paddles gained a level of popularity among some anime convention attendees as a novelty item used as a prop for cosplay and photo ops. Others used the paddles to spank cosplayers and other attendees, sometimes non-consensually. Conventions began banning yaoi paddles in the late 2000s in response to reports of their misuse for harassment and as weapons, including an unsubstantiated but notoriously circulated rumor that an individual suffered a shattered pelvis after being struck with a yaoi paddle. By the early 2010s, most conventions had revised their policies on prop weapons and harassment to prohibit the sale and possession of yaoi paddles; Hen Da Ne reported that they last sold yaoi paddles in 2011.

The original paddle design was created by the artist "Akicafe", who made the object as a gift for the owner of Hen Da Ne. The company later purchased the legal rights to mass-produce the paddle from Akicafe; the artist subsequently expressed reservations about the paddle's status as a mass-produced object, writing in a 2004 statement that "I never wanted it to turn into a big con staple that people would like or hate, and now has ballooned into hundreds of people nationwide spanking con-goers".

=== Intellectual property dispute ===
In February 2022, artist Henry AL launched a crowdfunding campaign on Kickstarter to re-manufacture and distribute yaoi paddles. While it reached its fundraising goal of £1,800 on its second day, the campaign was pulled after Hen Da Ne filed an intellectual property dispute with Kickstarter, accusing the artist of "blatantly stealing our design". While Henry AL characterized the copyright claim as "fraudulent", Hen Da Ne asserted that the style of yaoi paddle the artist intended to produce "is legally our design", adding that "if people want to make more [yaoi paddles], great, but not with our specific design. We don't want, nor need that association or blame if they start being used or brought to conventions."

== See also ==
- Yaoi fandom
- Glomp
- Erotic spanking
- Hammerspace
