= Dru Pagliassotti =

American writer

- Born: November 29, 1966 (age 59)
- Occupation: Author
- Writing career
- Genre: Fantasy literature

Dru Pagliassotti (born November 29, 1966) is an author of fantasy literature and the editor of The Harrow online magazine.

Their first published novel was Clockwork Heart, a steampunk fantasy novel about an Icarus-winged heroine, Taya, who stumbles into a murder mystery when she rescues a high caste official of the layered City of Ondinium. The novel, published by Juno Books in April 2008, received an excellent review from Drew Bittner of SFRevu. Pagliassotti's writing was compared to the work of China Miéville and D. M. Cornish. and the novel was translated to French and German. Pagliassotti was then signed to a trilogy deal with Hades Publications which included a republishing of Clockwork Heart under the EDGE imprint in September 2013, followed by Iron Wind in March 2014, and Heavy Fire in September 2014.

Since 1998 Pagliassotti has been the editor in chief and publisher of The Harrow and owner of The Harrow Press. The Harrow was a peer reviewed online literary magazine designed to support new writers as they develop their careers. The magazine published two anthologies of horror fiction.

Pagliassotti is also a professor in the communication department of California Lutheran University, where they research yaoi or "boys' love" fiction (manga, anime, visual novels and dōjinshi) from Japan.

In 2009, Pagliassotti was named one of the Year's Best Fantasy writers, qualifying their story "Bookmarked" to be published in the 21st edition of The Year's Best Fantasy & Horror.

== Works ==
=== Novels ===
- An Agreement with Hell (2011)
- Clockwork Heart (2008/2013)
- Iron Wind (2014)
- Heavy Fire (2014)

=== Short stories ===
- "The Manufactory" in Ceaseless Steam: Steampunk Stories from Beneath Ceaseless Skies (2012)
- "Ghost in the Machine" in The Mammoth Book of Ghost Romance (2012)
- "Code of Blood" in Corsets & Clockwork (2011)
- "After the Sleep" in Alien Shots (2011)
- "Pan de Los Muertos" in Dia de Los Muertos (2010)
- "To Every Thing there is a Season" in Apexology (2010)
- "Peter, Peter" in The Three-Lobed Burning Eye Annual, v. 4 (2009)
- "The Manufactory" in Beneath Ceaseless Skies (2009)
- "Terminus" with Jo Gerrard in Magic & Mechanica (2009)
- "Bookmarked" in Reflection’s Edge (2007) - Honorable Mention, Year's Best Fantasy and Horror (2008)
- "Night Shift" in Worlds of Wonder (2007)
- "Changing the End" in Anotherealm (2007)
- "Defender of the Faith" in Reflection’s Edge (2006)
- "Strange Vintage" in Fear of the Unknown (2005)
- "Joseph’s Plaint" in Ideomancer (2004)
- "Peter, Peter" in Three-Lobed Burning Ey (2003)
- "Pan de los Muertos" in Strange Horizons (2003)
- "After the Sleep" in Dark Fire (2003)
- "Analogues" in Erratica (1997)

=== Academic ===
- Pagliassotti, Dru; Nagaike, Kazumi; McHarry, Mark, eds. (May 20, 2013). "Special issue on boys' love manga". The Journal of Graphic Novels & Comics. 4 (1).
- Pagliassotti, Dru (September 2012). "Chapter 4: Love and the Machine: Technology and Human Relationships in Steampunk Romance and Erotica". In Taddeo, Julie Anne; Miller, Cynthia J. (eds.). Steaming into a Victorian Future: A Steampunk Anthology. Scarecrow Press. pp. 65–88. ISBN 978-0-8108-8586-8.
- Pagliassotti, Dru; Levi, Antonia; McHarry, Mark, eds. (2010). Boys' Love Manga: Essays on the Sexual Ambiguity and Cross-Cultural Fandom of the Genre. McFarland & Company. ISBN 978-0-7864-4195-2.
- Pagliassotti, Dru (November 2008). "Reading Boys' Love in the West". Particip@tions: Journal of Audience & Reception Studies. 5 (2). Archived from the original on August 1, 2012.
- Pagliassotti, Dru (April 2009). "GloBLisation and Hybridisation: Publishers' Strategies for Bringing Boys' Love to the United States". Intersections: Gender and Sexuality in Asia and the Pacific (20).
