= Youka Nitta =

Japanese manga artist

- Born: March 8, 1971 (age 55); Fukui Prefecture, Japan
- Occupation: Manga artist
- Known for: yaoi manga
- Website: Youka Nitta's official English site (archive)

Youka Nitta (新田祐克), born March 8, 1971, is a Japanese yaoi manga artist. Although Nitta was already a fan of manga, she was introduced to yaoi manga when she was in grade five, by an older girl who was her neighbour. Her first manga story, "GROUPIE", was published by Biblos in 1997. She believes in characters not always having to be the seme or uke, and her Embracing Love has been called the first title available with a "reversible" couple in English. In 2008 it was reported that Nitta had infringed upon the copyright of advertising photographs by tracing them for illustrations in her manga Embracing Love; she subsequently apologized for the misuse, as did her publisher. Nitta attended the 2002 Yaoi-Con and the 2006 New York Comic Con but cancelled her planned appearance at the 2008 Yaoi-Con in the aftermath of the tracing scandal.

== Bibliography ==
- Groupie, 1997, 1 volume
- 男が男を愛する時 (When a Man Loves a Man) Series, 1997, 9 volumes

Series includes When a Man Loves a Man (1 volume), Last Waltz (2 volumes), Nightcap (1 volume), Irokoi (3 volumes), and U:V (2 volumes)

- 春を抱いていた (Embrace the Spring), 1997, 14 volumes

Licensed in English as Embracing Love by Be Beautiful

- ホワイトブランド (White Brand), 1998, 1 volume

Licensed in English as White Brand by Juné

- 美味いもん食わせろ! (Give Me Something Delicious To Eat!), 1998, 2 volumes
- カジノ・リリィ (Casino Lilly), 1999, 1 volume

Licensed in English as Casino Lilly by Be Beautiful, but never released

- 17 Guyz, 2000, 1 volume
- Kiss of Fire (Embracing Love artbook), 2004, 1 volume

Licensed in English as Kiss of Fire by Digital Manga Publishing

- 僕の声 (My Voice), 2004, 3 volumes (ongoing)

Licensed in English as Sound of My Voice by Be Beautiful

- 舞踏会の手帖 (Un Carnet de Bal), 2006, 1 volume
- 公使閣下の秘密外交 (His Excellency the Foreign Minister's Secrets), 2006, 2 volumes (ongoing)

Licensed in English as The Prime Minister's Secret Diplomacy by 801 Media

- オトダマ – 音霊 (Otodama – Ghost Sound), 2007, 2 volumes (ongoing)

Licensed in English as Otodama: Voice From the Dead by DokiDoki
