= Yaoi-Con =

Anime convention

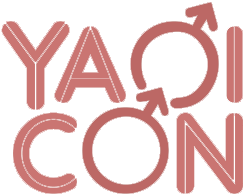
- Status: Defunct
- Venue: Hyatt Regency Santa Clara
- Locations: Santa Clara, California
- Country: United States
- Inaugurated: 2001
- Most recent: 2017
- Attendance: 1,500 in 2007
- Organizer: Since 2012: Digital Manga Publishing

Yaoi-Con (sometimes YaoiCon) was an annual three-day anime convention, founded in 2001, aimed at fans of yaoi-related anime, manga, and other aspects of Asian culture. It typically took place during the fall in California.

Since the 2012 edition, its organizer and main sponsor has been Digital Manga Publishing. It was known mostly for its unique events that use volunteers known as "bishounen". The bishounen were male volunteers who represented the attractive characters shown in yaoi manga and ran many of the events.

== Programming ==
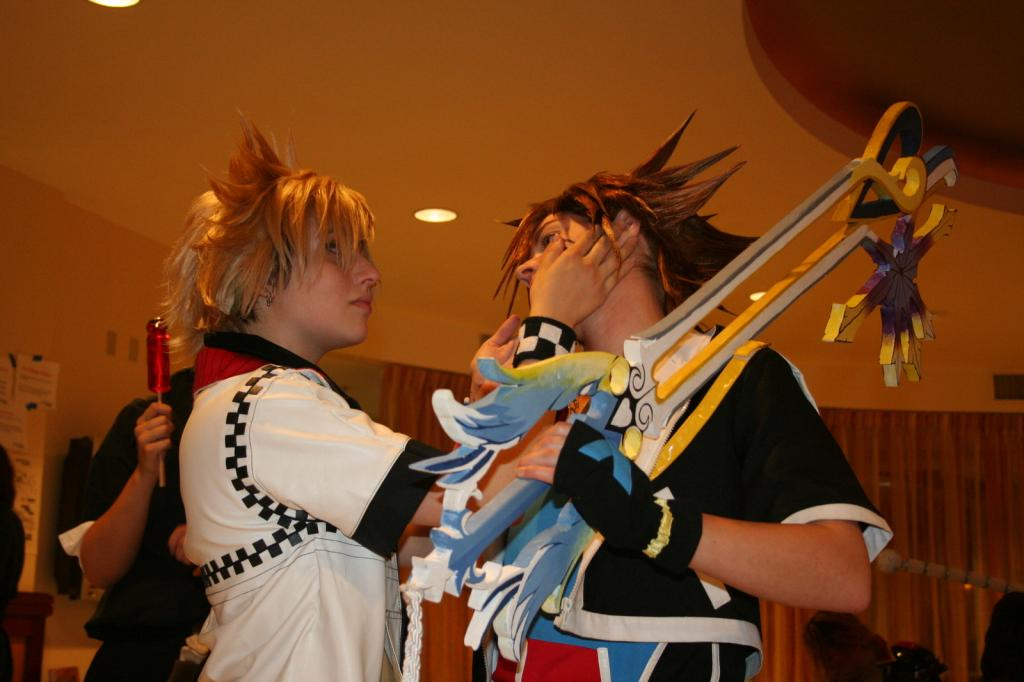
Two cosplayers (as Sora and Roxas from the video game Kingdom Hearts) strike a pose at Yaoi-Con 2008.

As with other anime conventions, Yaoi-Con had panels and workshops (with a yaoi twist), a 24-hour video room, a manga library, swap meet, a Dealers' Room filled with merchandise, a cosplay masquerade, and an anime music video contest. In addition, Yaoi-Con held a fan fiction contest, Bishounen Bingo, and its popular Saturday night fundraising Bishounen Auction. At bingo, and the auction, the bishounen volunteers put on shows and stripped to entertain the convention goers.

Each year Yaoi-Con sponsored at least one Japanese yaoi manga artist as guest of honor. And, as yaoi publishing expanded in the U.S., the companies who attended Yaoi-Con became interested in bringing guests with them. Guests of honor usually participated in question and answer/autograph sessions as well as sketch sessions where they demonstrated to attendees how they produced their work.

Because of the adult nature of its theme, Yaoi-Con required all attendees to be at least 18 and checked the legal ID of all attendees upon registration. As of 2003, 85% of Yaoi-Con membership was female, and mostly heterosexual.

== Inactivity ==
In December 2017, DMP announced that Yaoi-Con was taking "a one-year break", expecting to return "stronger than ever in Fall 2019." A tweet in January 2019 indicated that a new, non-profit organization might take over the event, but this never materialized. While the Yaoi-Con website went offline at the beginning of 2020, a public Facebook group page is still semi-active.

== History ==
=== Event history ===
Dates	Location	Guests
September 1, 2001	Radisson Miyako Hotel; San Francisco, California	You Higuri, Azusa Kurokawa, Shinjuku Nishiguchi, Gilles Poitras, Yoshihiro Yonezawa and Flash Mama.
October 18–20, 2002	Holiday Inn Golden Gateway; San Francisco, California	Youka Nitta, Andrew Conway, Patrick Drazen, and Secret Secret.
October 17–19, 2003	Renaissance Parc 55; San Francisco, California	Shushushu Sakurai, Jo Chen.
October 29–31, 2004	Westin San Francisco Airport; Millbrae, California	Ayano Yamane, Jo Chen, Lucina Project and John O'Donnell.
October 28–30, 2005	Westin San Francisco Airport; Millbrae, California	Kazuma Kodaka and You Higuri.
October 20–22, 2006	Westin San Francisco Airport; Millbrae, California	Asia Watanabe, Toko Kawai, Yishin Li, Lara Yokoshima, Studio Kawaii, Jo Chen
October 26–28, 2007	San Mateo Marriott San Francisco Airport; San Mateo, California	Mamiya Oki and Kawahara Tsubasa. Hinako Takanaga, Dany & Dany
September 26–28, 2008	San Mateo Marriott San Francisco Airport; San Mateo, California	Nase Yamato, Tatsumi Kaiya, Lynn Flewelling, Wendy Pini, Yamila Abraham, Yayoi Neko, M.A Sambre.
October 30-November 1, 2009	San Mateo Marriott San Francisco Airport; San Mateo, California	Kazuka Minami, Kano Miyamoto
October 29–31, 2010	Hyatt Regency San Francisco Airport; Burlingame, California	Ayano Yamane, Ryōtarō Okiayu, Hidenobu Kiuchi, Hinako Takanaga, Kano Miyamoto, Yasuhiro Nakamura, Lynn Flewelling, Jo Chen, Yayoi Neko
October 21–23, 2011	San Francisco Airport Marriott; Burlingame, California	Fusanosuke Inariya, Jo Chen
October 12–14, 2012	Westin Long Beach Hotel; Long Beach, California	Uki Ogasawara, Jo Chen
September 12–14, 2014	Hyatt Regency San Francisco Airport; Burlingame, California	Shoko Takaku, Reika
September 18–20, 2015	Hyatt Regency San Francisco Airport; Burlingame, California	Makoto Tateno, Martha Asahi
September 16–18, 2016	Hyatt Regency San Francisco Airport; Burlingame, California	Hinako Takanaga
October 6–8, 2017	Hyatt Regency Santa Clara; Santa Clara, California	Sakira, Psyche Delico
