= Boys' love =

Fiction genre depicting male same-sex relationships

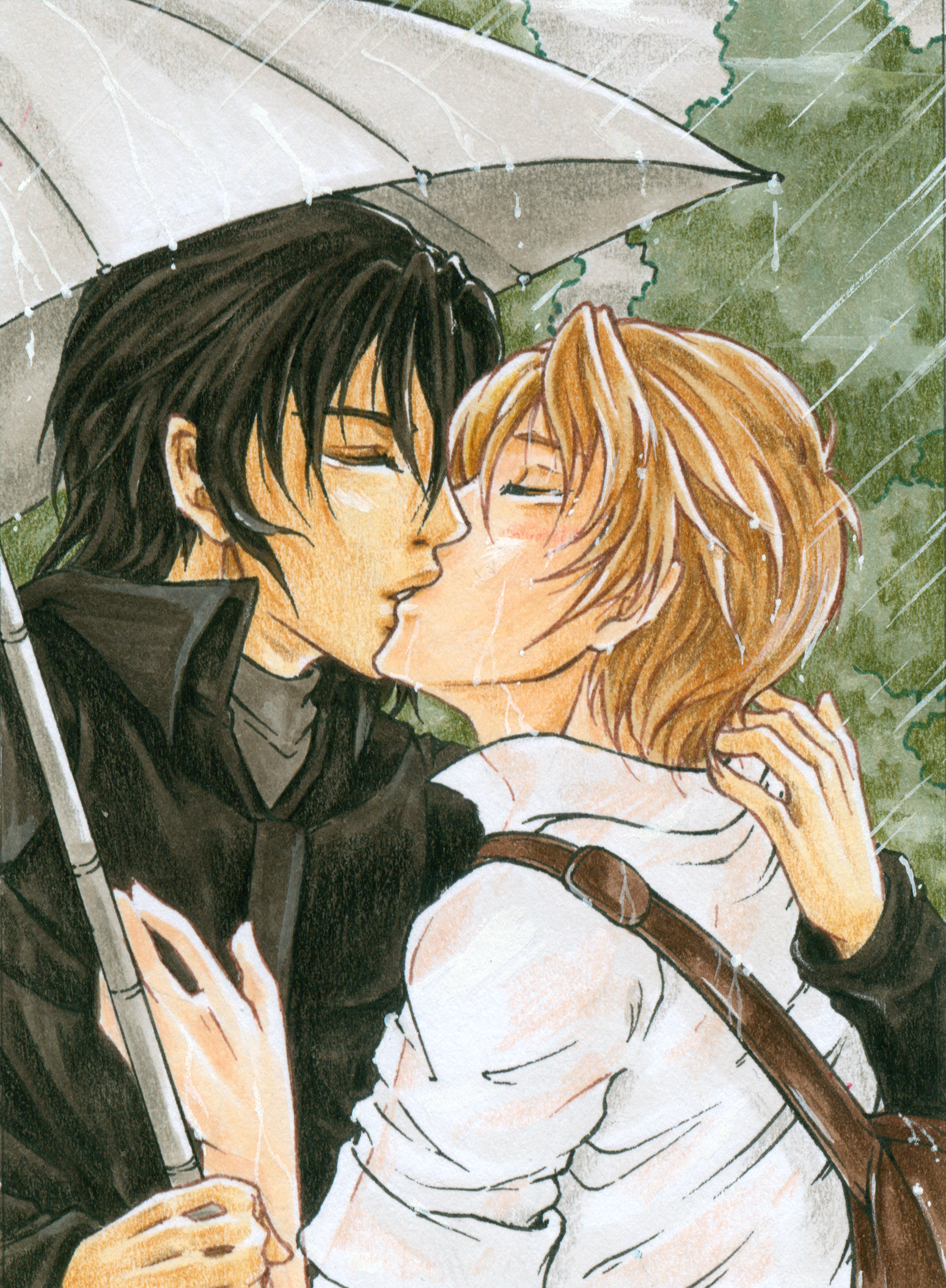
An example of BL-inspired artwork. The svelte, semi-androgynous physical features of the characters are typical of bishōnen (transl. 'beautiful youth' or 'beautiful boy') common in BL media.

Boys' love (Japanese: ボーイズ ラブ, Hepburn: bōizu rabu), also known by its abbreviation BL (ビーエル, bīeru), is a genre of fictional media originating in Japan that depicts homoerotic relationships between male characters. (Note: Works featuring homoerotic relationships between female characters are referred to as yuri.) It is typically created by women for a female audience, distinguishing it from the equivalent genre of homoerotic media created by and for gay men, though BL does also attract a male audience and can be produced by male creators. BL spans a wide range of media, including manga, anime, drama CDs, novels, video games, television series, films, and fan works.

Though depictions of homosexuality in Japanese media have a history dating to ancient times, contemporary BL traces its origins to male–male romance manga that emerged in the 1970s, and which formed a new subgenre of shōjo manga (comics for girls). Several terms were used for this genre, including shōnen-ai (少年愛; lit. "boy love"), tanbi (耽美; lit. "aesthete" or "aesthetic"), and June (ジュネ; [dʑɯne]). The term yaoi (/ˈjaʊi/ YOW-ee; Japanese: やおい [jaꜜo.i]) emerged as a name for the genre in the late 1970s and early 1980s in the context of dōjinshi (self-published works) culture as a portmanteau of yama nashi, ochi nashi, imi nashi ("no climax, no point, no meaning"), where it was used in a self-deprecating manner to refer to amateur fan works that focused on sex to the exclusion of plot and character development, and that often parodied mainstream manga and anime by depicting male characters from popular series in sexual scenarios. "Boys' love" was later adopted by Japanese publications in the 1990s as an umbrella term for male–male romance media marketed to women.

Concepts and themes associated with BL include androgynous men known as bishōnen; diminished female characters; narratives that emphasize homosociality and de-emphasize sociocultural homophobia; and depictions of rape. A commonly recurring characteristic of BL is the practice of pairing characters in relationships according to the roles of seme, the sexual top or active pursuer, and uke, the sexual bottom or passive pursued. BL has a robust global presence, having spread since the 1990s through international licensing and distribution, as well as through unlicensed circulation of works by BL fans online. BL works, culture, and fandom have been studied and discussed by scholars and journalists worldwide.

== Etymology and terminology ==
Multiple terms exist to describe Japanese and Japanese-influenced male–male romance fiction as a genre. In a 2015 survey of professional Japanese male–male romance fiction writers by Kazuko Suzuki, five primary subgenres were identified:

Shōnen-ai (Note: The term "bishōnen manga" was occasionally used in the 1970s, but fell out of use by the 1990s as works in this genre began to feature a broader range of protagonists beyond the traditional adolescent boys.) (少年愛; lit. "boy love")
While the term shōnen-ai historically connoted ephebophilia or pederasty, beginning in the 1970s it was used to describe a new genre of shōjo manga (girls' manga) featuring romance between bishōnen (lit. "beautiful boys"), a term for androgynous or effeminate male characters. Early shōnen-ai works were inspired by European literature, the writings of Taruho Inagaki, and the Bildungsroman genre. Shōnen-ai often features references to literature, history, science, and philosophy; Suzuki describes the genre as being "pedantic" and "difficult to understand", with "philosophical and abstract musings" that challenged young readers who were often only able to understand the references and deeper themes as they grew older.
Tanbi (Note: In Chinese male-male romance fiction, danmei (the Mandarin reading of the word tanbi) is used.) (耽美; lit. "aesthete" or "aesthetic")
Tanbi as a term and concept predates male–male romance manga that emerged in the 1970s, having originated to describe erotic highbrow literary fiction by authors such as Yukio Mishima, Jun'ichirō Tanizaki, and Yasunari Kawabata. By the 1980s, magazines aimed at shōnen-ai fans were using the term to describe fiction by both amateur and professional writers published in those magazines, as well as to designate literature with themes of homoeroticism and implied homosexuality by authors such as Oscar Wilde, Jean Cocteau, Tatsuhiko Shibusawa, and Mishima. Tanbi in this context is primarily used to describe prose fiction, but has also been used for manga and visual art.
June (ジュネ; Japanese pronunciation: [dʑɯne])
Derived from the eponymous male–male romance manga magazine first published in 1978, the term was originally used to describe works that resembled the art style of manga published in that magazine. It has also been used to describe amateur works depicting male homosexuality that are original creations and not derivative works. By the 1990s, the term had largely fallen out of use in favor of "boys' love"; it has been suggested that publishers wishing to get a foothold in the June market coined "boys' love" to disassociate the genre from the publisher of June.
Yaoi (Note: In Japan, the term yaoi is occasionally written as "801", which can be read as yaoi through Japanese wordplay: the short reading of the number eight is "ya", zero can be read as "o" (a Western influence), while the short reading for one is "i". Less commonly, the term is read as an acronym for yamete, oshiri ga itai (やめて お尻が 痛い; "stop, my ass hurts!").) (やおい)
Coined in the late 1970s by manga artists Yasuko Sakata and Akiko Hatsu, yaoi is a portmanteau of yama nashi, ochi nashi, imi nashi (山[場]なし、落ちなし、意味なし), which translates to "no climax, no point, no meaning". (Note: Kubota Mitsuyoshi says that Osamu Tezuka used yama nashi, ochi nashi, imi nashi to dismiss poor quality manga, and this was appropriated by the early yaoi authors.) The term originated as a self-deprecating and ironic euphemism for male-male romance dōjinshi (self-published works) that focus on sex to the exclusion of plot and character development. The term is additionally a subversive reference to the classical Japanese narrative structure of introduction, development, twist, and conclusion.
Boys' love (ボーイズ ラブ, bōizu rabu)
Typically written as the acronym BL (ビーエル, bīeru), or alternately as "boy's love" or "boys love", the term is a wasei-eigo construction derived from the literal English translation of shōnen-ai. First used in 1991 by the magazine Image in an effort to collect these disparate genres under a single term, the term became widely popularized in 1994 after being used by the magazine Puff. "BL" is the common term used to describe male–male romance media marketed to women in Japan and much of Asia, though its usage in the West is inconsistent.

Despite attempts by researchers to codify differences between these subgenres, in practice these terms are used interchangeably. Kazumi Nagaike and Tomoko Aoyama note that while BL and yaoi are the most common generic terms for this kind of media, they specifically avoid attempts at defining subgenres, noting that the differences between them are ill-defined and that even when differentiated, the subgenres "remain thematically intertwined."

In Suzuki's investigation of these subgenres, she notes that "there is no appropriate and convenient Japanese shorthand term to embrace all subgenres of male–male love fiction by and for women." Yaoi has been used as an umbrella term in the West for Japanese-influenced comics with male–male relationships, and was preferentially used by American manga publishers for works of this kind due to the belief that the term "boys' love" carries the implication of pedophilia. In Japan, yaoi is used to denote dōjinshi and works that focus on sex scenes. In all usages, yaoi and boys' love excludes gay manga (bara), a genre which also depicts gay male sexual relationships, but is written for and mostly by gay men.

In the West, the term shōnen-ai is sometimes used to describe titles that focus on romance over explicit sexual content, while yaoi is used to describe titles that primarily feature sexually explicit themes and subject material. Yaoi can also be used by Western fans as a label for anime or manga-based slash fiction. The Japanese use of yaoi to denote only works with explicit scenes sometimes clashes with the Western use of the word to describe the genre as a whole, creating confusion between Japanese and Western audiences.

== History ==
=== Before 1970: The origins of shōnen-ai ===
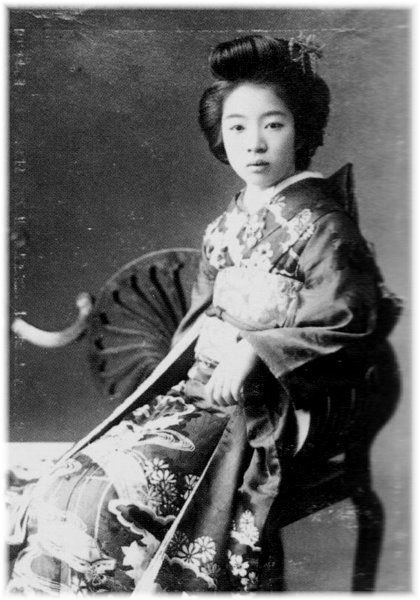
Mari Mori, whose tanbi novels laid the foundation for many of the common genre tropes of shōnen-ai

Homosexuality and androgyny have a history in Japan dating to ancient times, as seen in practices such as shudō (衆道; same-sex love between samurai and their companions) and kagema (陰間; male prostitutes who served as apprentice kabuki actors). The country shifted away from a tolerance of homosexuality amid Westernization during the Meiji Era (1868–1912), and moved towards hostile social attitudes towards homosexuality and the implementation of anti-sodomy laws.

In the face of this legal and cultural shift, artists who depicted male homosexuality in their work typically did so through subtext. Illustrations by Kashō Takabatake in the shōnen manga (boys' comics) magazine Nihon Shōnen formed the foundation of what would become the aesthetic of bishōnen: boys and young men, often in homosocial or homoerotic contexts, who are defined by their "ambivalent passivity, fragility, ephemerality, and softness." The 1961 novel A Lovers' Forest by tanbi writer Mari Mori, which follows the relationship between a professor and his younger male lover, is regarded as an influential precursor to the shōnen-ai genre. Mori's works were influenced by European literature, particularly Gothic literature, and laid the foundation for many of the common tropes of shōnen-ai, yaoi, and BL: Western exoticism, educated and wealthy characters, significant age differences among couples, and fanciful or even surreal settings.

In manga, the concept of gekiga (劇画) emerged in the late 1950s, which sought to use manga to tell serious and grounded stories aimed at adult audiences. Gekiga inspired the creation of manga that depicted realistic human relationships, and opened the way for manga that explored human sexuality in a non-pornographic context. Hideko Mizuno's 1969 shōjo manga (girls' comics) series Fire! (1969–1971), which eroticized its male protagonists and depicted male homosexuality in American rock and roll culture, is noted as an influential work in this regard.

=== 1970s and 1980s: From shōnen-ai to yaoi ===
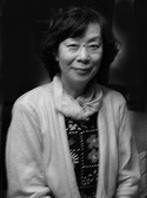
Moto Hagio, a member of the Year 24 Group and a major figure in the shōnen-ai genre

Contemporary Japanese homoerotic romance manga originated in the 1970s as a subgenre of shōjo manga. The decade saw the arrival of a new generation of shōjo manga artists, most notable among them the Year 24 Group. The Year 24 Group contributed significantly to the development of the shōjo manga, introducing a greater diversity of themes and subject material to the genre that drew inspiration from Japanese and European literature, cinema, and history. Members of the group, including Keiko Takemiya and Moto Hagio, created works that depicted male homosexuality: In The Sunroom (1970) by Takemiya is considered the first work of the genre that would become known as shōnen-ai, followed by Hagio's The November Gymnasium (1971).

Takemiya, Hagio, Toshie Kihara, Ryoko Yamagishi, and Kaoru Kurimoto were among the most significant shōnen-ai artists of this era; notable works include The Heart of Thomas (1974–1975) by Hagio and Kaze to Ki no Uta (1976–1984) by Takemiya. Works by these artists typically featured tragic romances between androgynous bishōnen in historic European settings. Though these works were nominally aimed at an audience of adolescent girls and young women, they also attracted adult gay and lesbian readers. During this same period, the first gay manga magazines were published: Barazoku, the first commercially circulated gay men's magazine in Japan, was published in 1971, and served as a major influence on Takemiya and the development of shōnen-ai.

The dōjinshi (self-published works) subculture emerged contemporaneously in the 1970s (see Media below), and in 1975, the first Comiket was held as a gathering of amateur artists who produce dōjinshi. The term yaoi, initially used by some creators of male–male romance dōjinshi to describe their creations ironically, emerged to describe amateur works that were influenced by shōnen-ai and gay manga. Early yaoi dōjinshi produced for Comiket were typically derivative works, with glam rock artists such as David Bowie and Queen as popular subjects as a result of the influence of Fire!; yaoi dōjinshi were also more sexually explicit than shōnen-ai.

In reaction to the success of shōnen-ai and early yaoi, publishers sought to exploit the market by creating magazines devoted to the genre. Young female illustrators cemented themselves in the manga industry by publishing yaoi works, with this genre later becoming "a transnational subculture." Publishing house Magazine Magazine, which published the gay manga magazine Sabu, launched the magazine June in 1978, while Minori Shobo launched Allan in 1980. Both magazines initially specialized in shōnen-ai, which Magazine Magazine described as "halfway between tanbi literature and pornography," and also published articles on homosexuality, literary fiction, illustrations, and amateur yaoi works. The success of June was such that the term June-mono or more simply June began to compete with the term shōnen-ai to describe works depicting male homosexuality.

By the late 1980s, the popularity of professionally published shōnen-ai was declining, and yaoi published as dōjinshi was becoming more popular. Mainstream shōnen manga with Japanese settings, such as Captain Tsubasa became popular source material for derivative works by yaoi creators, and the genre increasingly depicted Japanese settings over Western settings. Works influenced by shōnen-ai in the 1980s began to depict older protagonists and adopted a realist style in both plot and artwork, as typified by manga such as Banana Fish (1985–1994) by Akimi Yoshida and Tomoi (1986) by Wakuni Akisato. The 1980s also saw the proliferation of yaoi into anime, drama CDs, and light novels; the 1982 anime adaptation of Patalliro! was the first television anime to depict shōnen-ai themes, while Kaze to Ki no Uta and Earthian were adapted into anime in the original video animation (home video) format in 1987 and 1989, respectively.

=== 1990s: Mainstream popularity and yaoi ronsō ===
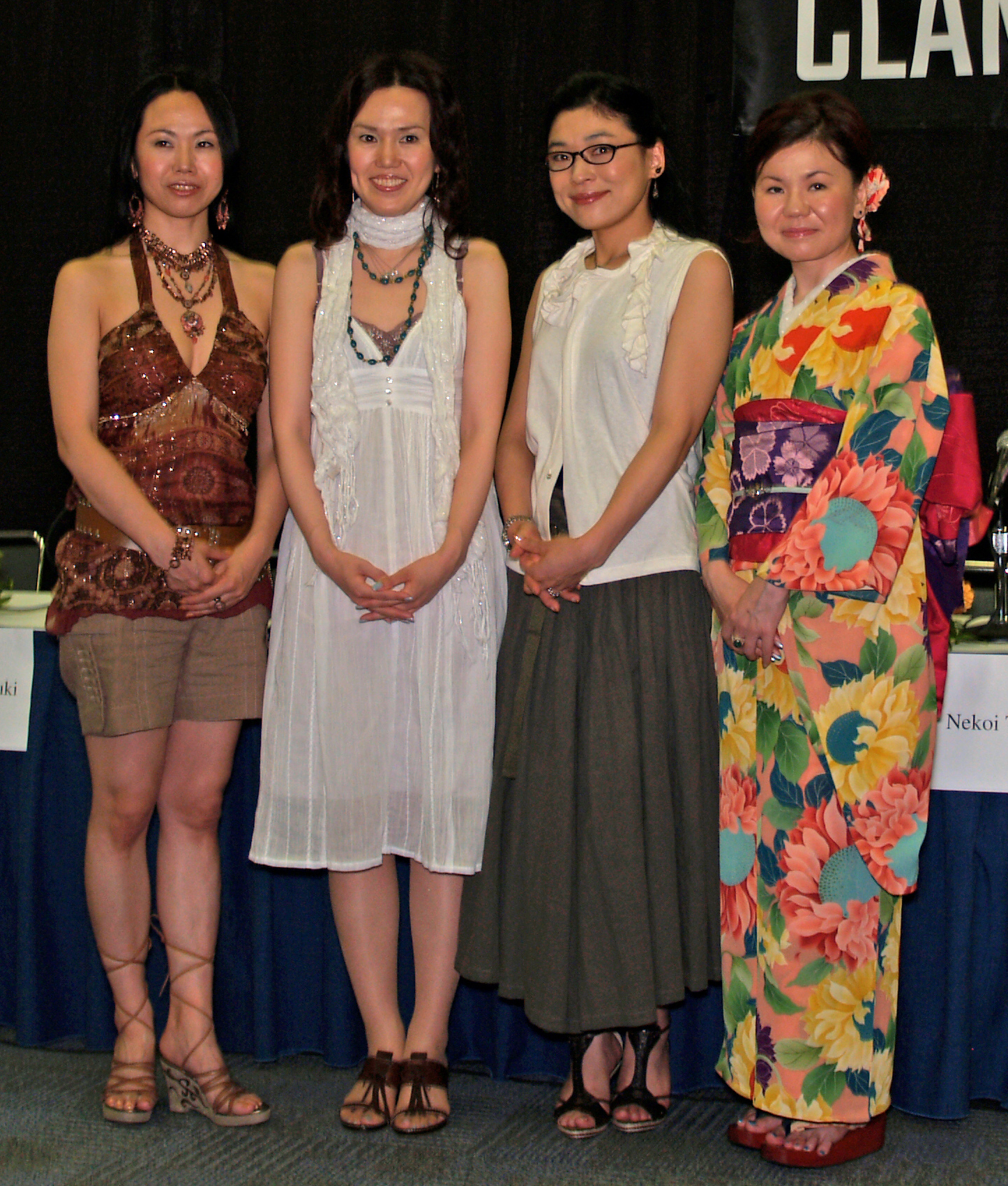
The manga artist group Clamp, whose works were among the first yaoi-influenced media to be encountered by Western audiences

The growing popularity of yaoi attracted the attention of manga magazine editors, many of whom recruited yaoi dōjinshi authors to their publications; Zetsuai 1989 (1989–1991) by Minami Ozaki, a yaoi series published in the shōjo magazine Margaret, was originally a Captain Tsubasa dōjinshi created by Ozaki that she adapted into an original work. By 1990, seven Japanese publishers included yaoi content in their offerings, which kickstarted the commercial publishing market of the genre. Between 1990 and 1995, thirty magazines devoted to yaoi were established: Magazine Be × Boy, founded in 1993, became one of the most influential yaoi manga magazines of this era. The manga in these magazines were influenced by realist stories like Banana Fish, and moved away from the shōnen-ai standards of the 1970s and 1980s. Shōnen-ai works that were published during this period were typically comedies rather than melodramas, such as Gravitation (1996–2002) by Maki Murakami. Consequently, yaoi and "boys' love" (BL) came to be the most popular terms to describe works depicting male–male romance, eclipsing shōnen-ai and June.

An increasing proportion of shōjo manga in the 1990s began to integrate yaoi elements into their plots. The manga artist group Clamp, which itself began as a group creating yaoi dōjinshi, published multiple works containing yaoi elements during this period, such as RG Veda (1990–1995), Tokyo Babylon (1991–1994), and Cardcaptor Sakura (1996–2000). When these works were released in North America, they were among the first yaoi-influenced media to be encountered by Western audiences. BL gained popularity in mainland China in the late 1990s; the country subsequently outlawed the publishing and distribution of BL works.

The mid-1990s saw the so-called "yaoi debate" or yaoi ronsō (や お い 論争), a debate held primarily in a series of essays published in the feminist magazine Choisir from 1992 to 1997. In an open letter, Japanese gay writer Masaki Satō criticized the genre as homophobic for not depicting gay men accurately, and called fans of yaoi "disgusting women" who "have a perverse interest in sexual intercourse between men." A years-long debate ensued, with yaoi fans and artists contending that yaoi is entertainment for women that does not seek to be a realistic depiction of homosexuality, and instead serves as a refuge from the misogyny of Japanese society. The scholarly debate that the yaoi ronsō engendered led to the formation of the field of "BL studies", which focus on the study of BL and the relationship between women and BL. It additionally impacted creators of yaoi: author Chiyo Kurihara abandoned yaoi to focus on heterosexual pornography as a result of the yaoi ronsō, while Hisako Takamatsu took into account the arguments of the genre's critics to create works more accommodating of a gay audience.

=== 2000s–present: Globalization of yaoi and BL ===
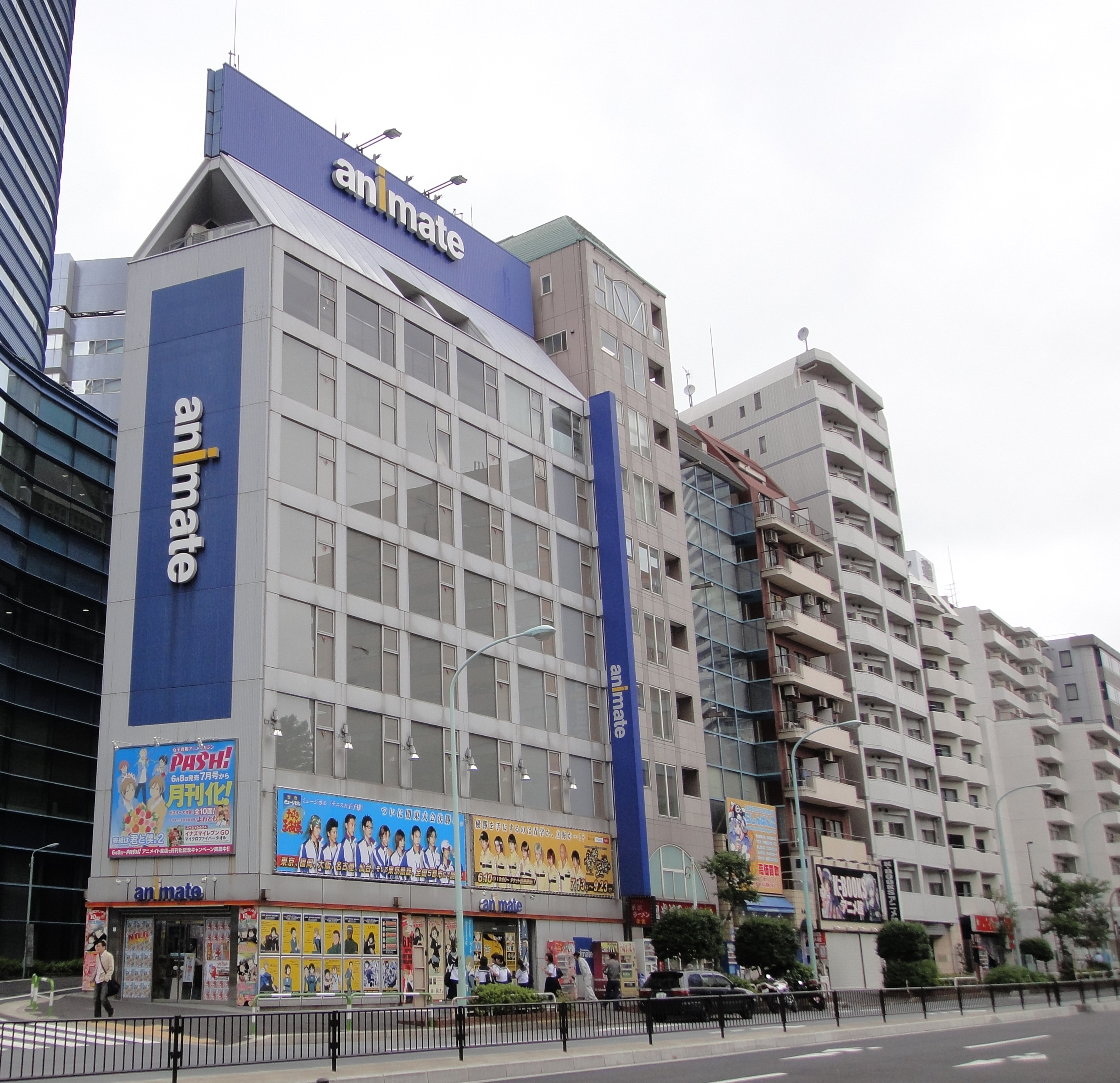
Otome Road in Ikebukuro became a major cultural destination for yaoi fandom in the 2000s.

The economic crisis caused by the Lost Decade came to affect the manga industry in the late 1990s and early 2000s, but did not particularly impact the yaoi market; on the contrary, yaoi magazines continued to proliferate during this period, and sales of yaoi media increased. In 2004, Otome Road in Ikebukuro emerged as a major cultural destination for yaoi fandom, with multiple stores dedicated to shōjo and yaoi goods. The 2000s also saw an increase in male readers of yaoi, with a 2008 bookstore survey finding that between 25–30% of yaoi readers were male.

The 2000s saw significant growth of yaoi in international markets, beginning with the founding of the American anime convention Yaoi-Con in 2001. The first officially licensed English-language translations of yaoi manga were published in the North American market in 2003 (see Media below); the market expanded rapidly before contracting in 2008 as a result of the 2008 financial crisis, but continued to grow slowly in the following years. South Korea saw the development of BL in the form of manhwa, notably Martin and John (2006) by Park Hee-jung and Crush on You (2006) by Lee Kyung-ha.

The 2010s and 2020s saw an increase in the popularity of yaoi and BL media in China and Thailand in the form of web novels, live-action films, and live-action television dramas (see Media below). Though "boys' love" and "BL" have become the generic terms for this material across Asia, in Thailand, BL dramas are sometimes referred to as "Y" or "Y series" as a shorthand for yaoi. Thai Series Y explicitly adapts the content of Japanese BL to the Thai local context and in recent years has become increasingly popular with fans around the world who often view Thai BL as separate to its Japanese antecedents. Thai BL also deliberately borrows from K-pop celebrity culture in the development of its own style of idols known as khu jin (imaginary couples) who are designed to be paired together by Thai BL's predominantly female fans. For cultural anthropologist Thomas Baudinette, BL series produced in Thailand represent the next stage in the historic development of BL, which is increasingly becoming "dislocated" from Japan among international fans' understanding of the genre.

While BL fandom in China traces back to the late 1990s as danmei (the Mandarin reading of the Japanese term tanbi), state regulations in China made it difficult for danmei writers to publish their works online, with a 2009 ordinance by the National Publishing Administration of China banning most danmei online fiction. In 2015, laws prohibiting depictions of same-sex relationships in television and film were implemented in China. The growth in streaming service providers in the 2010s is regarded as a driving force behind the production of BL dramas across Asia, as online distribution provides a platform for media containing non-heterosexual material, which is frequently not permitted on broadcast television.

== Concepts and themes ==
=== Bishōnen ===
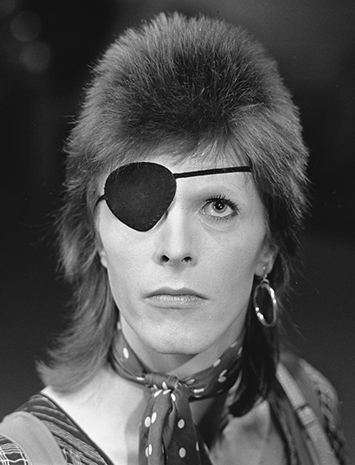
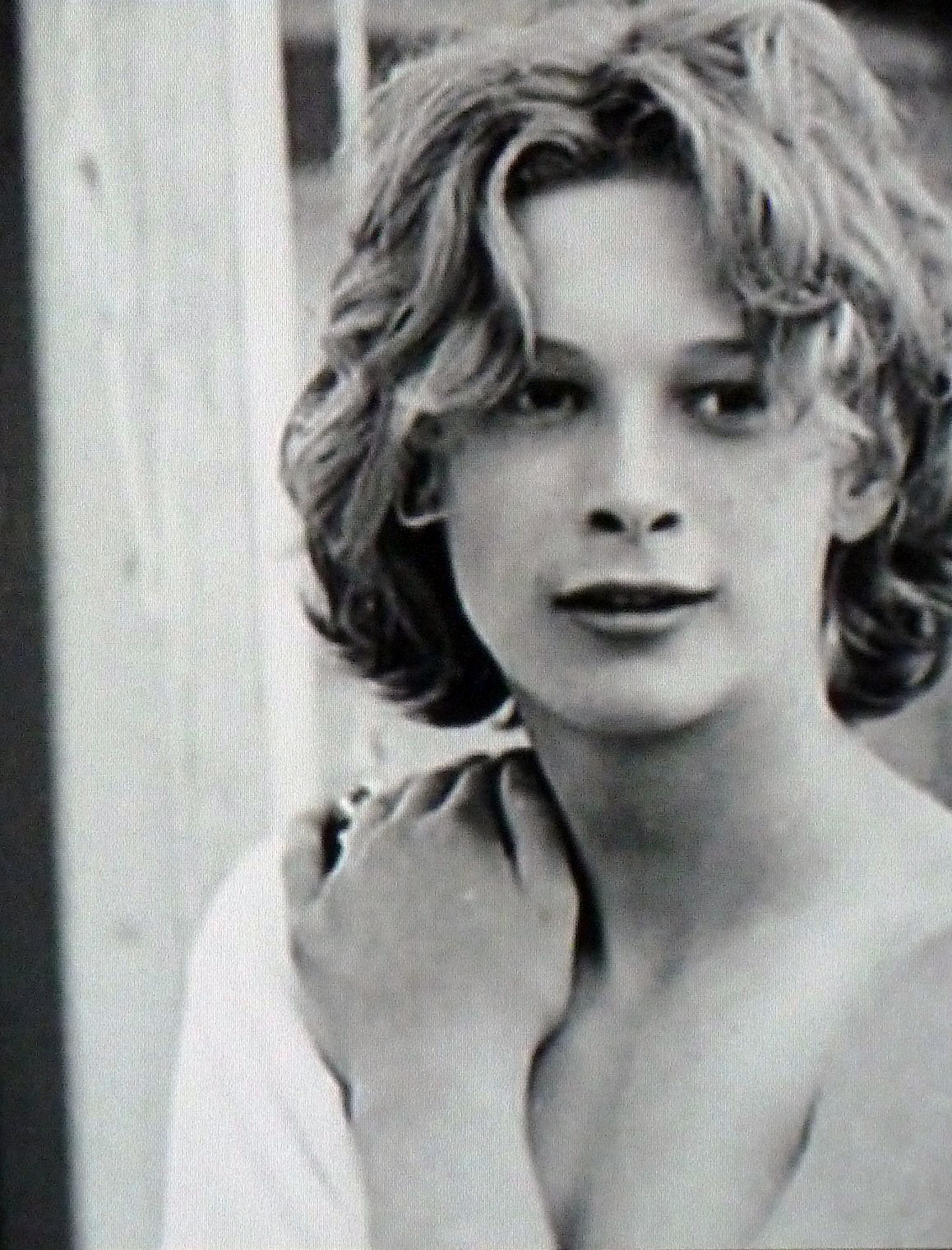
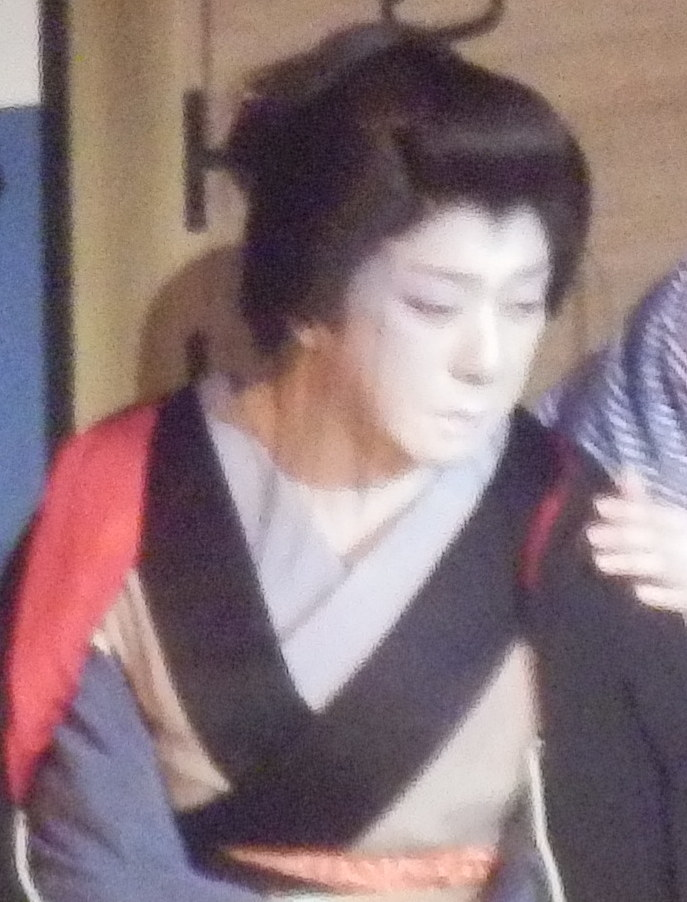
Musician David Bowie, actor Björn Andrésen, and kabuki actor Bandō Tamasaburō influenced depictions of bishōnen characters in shōjo and BL manga.

The protagonists of BL are often bishōnen (美少年; lit. "beautiful boy"), "highly idealised" boys and young men who blend both masculine and feminine qualities. Bishōnen as a concept can be found disparately throughout East Asia, but its specific aesthetic manifestation in 1970s shōjo manga (and subsequently in shōnen-ai manga) drew influence from popular culture of the era, including glam rock artists such as David Bowie, actor Björn Andrésen's portrayal of Tadzio in the 1971 film adaptation of Death in Venice, and kabuki onnagata Bandō Tamasaburō. Though bishōnen are not exclusive to BL, the androgyny of bishōnen is often exploited to explore notions of sexuality and gender in BL works.

The late 2010s saw the increasing popularity of masculine men in BL that are reminiscent of the body types typical in gay manga, with growing emphasis on stories featuring muscular bodies and older characters. A 2017 survey by BL publisher Juné Manga found that while over 80% of their readership previously preferred bishōnen body types exclusively, 65% now enjoy both bishōnen and muscular body types. Critics and commentators have noted that this shift in preferences among BL readers, and subsequent creation of works that feature characteristics of both BL and gay manga represents a blurring of the distinctions between the genres; anthropologist Thomas Baudinette notes in his fieldwork that gay men in Japan "saw no need to sharply disassociate BL from [gay manga] when discussing their consumption of 'gay media'."

=== Seme and uke ===
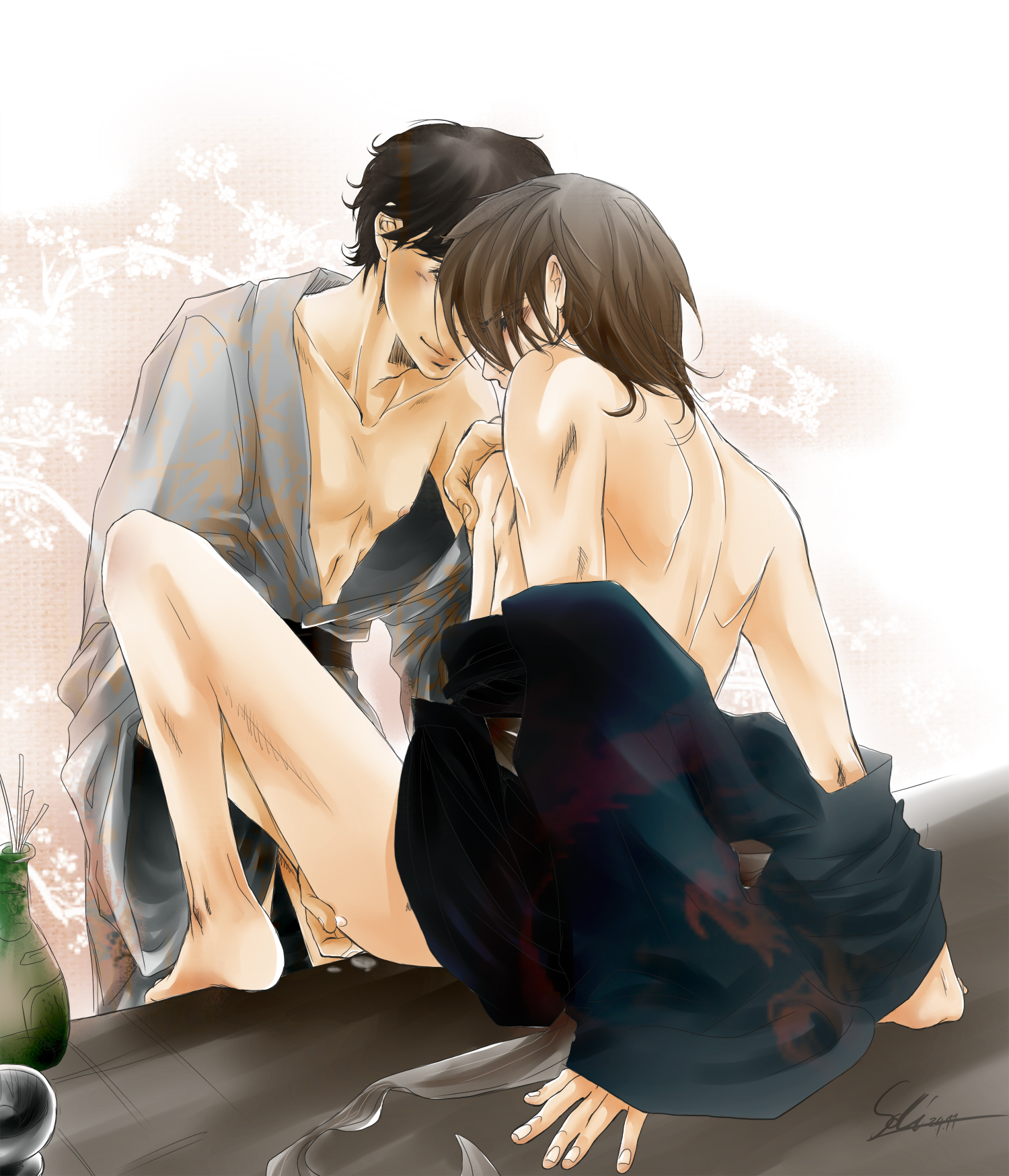
Artwork depicting a seme (top) and uke (bottom) couple

The two participants in a BL relationship (and to a lesser extent in yuri) are often referred to as seme (攻め; lit. "top", as derived from the ichidan verb "to attack") and uke (受け; lit. "bottom", as derived from the ichidan verb "to receive"). These terms originated in martial arts, and were later appropriated as Japanese LGBT slang to refer to the insertive and receptive partners in anal sex. Aleardo Zanghellini suggests that the martial arts terms have special significance to a Japanese audience, as an archetype of the gay male relationship in Japan includes same-sex love between samurai and their companions. He suggests that the samurai archetype is responsible for age differences and hierarchical variations in power of some relationships portrayed in BL.

The seme is often depicted as restrained, physically powerful, and protective; he is generally older and taller, with a stronger chin, shorter hair, smaller eyes, and a more stereotypically masculine and "macho" demeanour than the uke. The seme usually pursues the uke, who often has softer, androgynous, feminine features with bigger eyes and a smaller build, and is often physically weaker than the seme. The roles of seme and uke can alternatively be established by who is dominant in the relationship; a character can take the uke role even if he is not presented as feminine, simply by being juxtaposed against and pursued by a more dominant and masculine character. Anal sex is ubiquitous in BL, and is typically rendered explicitly and not merely implied; Zanghellini notes that illustrations of anal sex almost always position the characters to face each other rather than "doggy style", and that the uke rarely fellates the seme, but instead receives the sexual and romantic attentions of the seme.

Though Mark McLelland notes that authors are typically "interested in exploring, not repudiating" the dynamics between the seme and uke, not all works adhere to seme and uke tropes. The possibility of switching roles is often a source of playful teasing and sexual excitement for the characters, indicating an interest among many genre authors in exploring the performative nature of the roles. Riba (リバ), a shorthand for "reversible" (リバーシブル), is used to describe couples where the seme and uke roles are not strictly defined. Occasionally, authors will forego the stylisations of the seme and uke to portray both lovers as "equally attractive handsome men", or will subvert expectations of dominance by depicting the active pursuer in the relationship as taking the passive role during sex. In other cases, the uke is presented as more sexually aggressive than the seme; in these instances, the roles are sometimes referred to as osoi uke (襲い受け; "attacking uke") and hetare seme (ヘタレ攻め; "wimpy seme").

=== Diminished female characters ===
Historically, female characters had minor roles in BL, or were absent altogether. Suzuki notes that mothers in particular are often portrayed in a negative light; she suggests this is because the character and reader alike are seeking to substitute the absence of unconditional maternal love with the "forbidden" all-consuming love presented in BL. In dōjinshi parodies based on existing works that include female characters, the female's role is typically either minimized or the character is killed off; Yukari Fujimoto noted that in these parodies, "it seems that yaoi readings and likeable female characters are mutually exclusive." Nariko Enomoto, a BL author, suggests that women are typically not depicted in BL as their presence adds an element of realism that distracts from a fantasy narrative.

Since the late 2000s, women have appeared more frequently in BL works as supporting characters. Lunsing notes that early shōnen-ai and yaoi were often regarded as misogynistic, with the diminished role of female characters cited as evidence of the internalized misogyny of the genre's largely female readership. He suggests that the decline of these misogynistic representations over time is evidence that authors and readers "overcame this hate, possibly thanks to their involvement with yaoi."

=== Gay equality ===
BL stories are often strongly homosocial, giving men freedom to bond and pursue shared goals together (as in dojinshi adaptations of shōnen manga), or to rival each other (as in Embracing Love). This spiritual bond and equal partnership is depicted as overcoming the male–female gender hierarchy. As is typical in romance fiction, couples depicted in these stories often must overcome obstacles that are emotional or psychological rather than physical. Akiko Mizoguchi notes that while early stories depicted homosexuality as a source of shame to heighten dramatic tension in this regard, beginning in the mid-2000s the genre began to depict gay identity with greater sensitivity and nuance, with series such as Brilliant Blue featuring stories of coming out and the characters' gradual acceptance within the wider community. BL typically depicts Japanese society as more accepting of LGBT people than it is in reality, which Mizoguchi contends is a form of activism among BL authors. Some longer-form stories such as Fake and Kizuna: Bonds of Love have the couple form a family unit, depicting them cohabiting and adopting children. It is also possible that they marry and have children, as in Omegaverse publications. Fujimoto cites Ossan's Love (2016–2018) and other BL television dramas that emerged in the 2010s as a "'missing link' to bridge the gap between BL fiction and gay people," arguing that when BL narratives are presented using human actors, it produces a "subconscious change in the perception of viewers" towards acceptance of homosexuality.

Although gay male characters are empowered in BL, the genre frequently does not address the reality of sociocultural homophobia. According to Hisako Miyoshi, vice editor-in-chief for Libre Publishing, while earlier works in the genre focused "more on the homosexual way of life from a realistic perspective", over time the genre has become less realistic and more comedic, and the stories are "simply for entertainment". BL manga often have fantastical, historical or futuristic settings, and many fans consider the genre to be escapist fiction. Homophobia, when it is presented as an issue at all, is used as a plot device to heighten drama, or to show the purity of the leads' love. Rachel Thorn has suggested that as BL is primarily a romance genre, its readers may be turned off by political themes such as homophobia. BL author Makoto Tateno expressed skepticism that realistic depictions of gay men's lives would become common in BL "because girls like fiction more than realism". Alan Williams argues that the lack of a gay identity in BL is due to BL being postmodern, stating that "a common utterance in the genre—when a character claims that he is 'not gay, but just in love with a man'—has both homophobic (or modern) temporal undertones but also non-identitarian (postmodern) ones." In 2019, BL manga magazine editors stated that stories where a man is concerned about coming out as gay have become uncommon and the trope can be seen as outdated if used as a source of conflict between the characters.

=== Rape ===
Eroticized depictions of rape are often associated with BL. Anal sex is understood as a means of expressing commitment to a partner, and in BL, the "apparent violence" of rape is transformed into a "measure of passion". Rape scenes in BL are rarely presented as crimes with an assaulter and a victim: scenes where a seme rapes an uke are not depicted as symptomatic of the violent desires of the seme, but rather as evidence of the uncontrollable attraction felt by the seme towards the uke. Such scenes are often a plot device used to make the uke see the seme as more than just a good friend, and typically result in the uke falling in love with the seme.

While Japanese society often shuns or looks down upon women who are raped in reality, the BL genre depicts men who are raped as still "imbued with innocence" and are typically still loved by their rapists after the act, a trope that may have originated with Kaze to Ki no Uta. Kristy Valenti of The Comics Journal notes that rape narratives typically focus on how "irresistible" the uke is and how the seme "cannot control himself" in his presence, thus absolving the seme of responsibility for his rape of the uke. She notes this is likely why the narrative climax of many BL stories depicts the seme recognizing, and taking responsibility for, his sexual desires. Where the uke is raped by a third party, the relationship is shown to be emotionally supportive. Conversely, some stories such as Under Grand Hotel subvert the rape fantasy trope entirely by presenting rape as a negative and traumatic act.

A 2012 survey of English-language BL fans found that just 15% of respondents reported that the presence of rape in BL media made them uncomfortable, as the majority of respondents could distinguish between the "fantasy, genre-driven rape" of BL and rape as a crime in reality. This "surprisingly high tolerance" for depictions of rape is contextualized by a content analysis, which found that just 13% of all original Japanese BL available commercially in English contains depictions of rape. These findings are argued as "possibly belying the perception that rape is almost ubiquitous in BL/yaoi."

=== Tragedy ===
Tragic narratives that focused on the suffering of the protagonists were popular early June stories, particularly stories that ended in one or both members of the central couple dying from suicide. By the mid-1990s, happy endings were more common; when tragic endings are shown, the cause is typically not an interpersonal conflict between the couple, but "the cruel and intrusive demands of an uncompromising outside world". Thorn theorizes that depictions of tragedy and abuse in BL exist to allow the audience "to come to terms in some way with their own experiences of abuse."

=== Subgenres and related genres ===
Bara (薔薇; "rose"), also known as gay manga (ゲイ漫画) or gei komi (ゲイコミ; "gay comics") is a genre focused on male same-sex love, as created primarily by gay men for a gay male audience. Gay manga typically focuses on masculine men with varying degrees of muscle, body fat, and body hair, in contrast to the androgynous bishōnen of BL. Graham Kolbeins writes in Massive: Gay Erotic Manga and the Men Who Make It that while BL can be understood as a primarily feminist phenomenon, in that it depicts sex that is free of the patriarchal trappings of heterosexual pornography, gay manga is primarily an expression of gay male identity. The early 2000s saw a degree of overlap between BL and gay manga in BDSM-themed publications: the yaoi BDSM anthology magazine Zettai Reido (絶対零度) had several male contributors, while several female BL authors have contributed stories to BDSM-themed gay manga anthologies or special issues, occasionally under male pen names.

Shotacon (ショタコン, shotakon) is a genre that depicts prepubescent or pubescent boys in a romantic or pornographic context. Originating as an offshoot of yaoi in the early 1980s, the subgenre was later adopted by male readers and became influenced by lolicon (works depicting prepubescent or pubescent girls); the conflation of shotacon in its contemporary usage with BL is thus not universally accepted, as the genre constitutes material that marketed to both male and female audiences.

Omegaverse is a male–male romance subgenre that originated from the American series Supernatural and in the 2010s became a subgenre of both commercial and non-commercial BL. Stories in the genre are premised on societies wherein humans are divided into a dominance hierarchy of dominant "alphas", neutral "betas", and submissive "omegas". These terms are derived from those used in ethology to describe social hierarchies in animals. The "dom/sub universe" subgenre emerged in 2017 and gained popularity in 2021. The subgenre uses BDSM elements and also draws influences from Omegaverse, particularly the use of a caste system.

== Media ==
In 2003, 3.8% of weekly Japanese manga magazines were dedicated exclusively to BL. Notable ongoing and defunct magazines include Magazine Be × Boy, June, Craft, Chara, Dear+, Opera, Ciel, and Gush. Several of these magazines were established as companion publications to shōjo manga magazines, as they include material considered too explicit for an all-ages audience; Ciel was established as a companion to Monthly Asuka, while Dear+ was established as a companion to Wings. A 2008 assessment estimated that the Japanese commercial BL market grossed approximately ¥12 billion annually, with novel sales generating ¥250 million per month, manga generating ¥400 million per month, CDs generating ¥180 million per month, and video games generating ¥160 million per month. A 2010 report estimated that the Japanese BL market was worth approximately ¥21.3 billion in both 2009 and 2010. In 2019, editors from Lynx, Magazine Be × Boy, and On BLUE stated that, with the growth of BL artists in Taiwan and South Korea, they have recruited and published several of their works in Japan with expectations that the BL manga industry will diversify.

=== Fan works (dōjinshi) ===
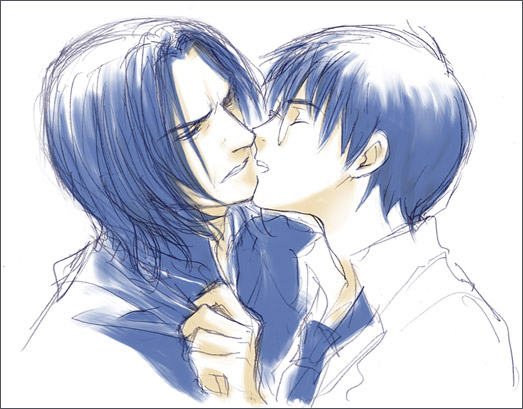
BL dōjinshi are typically derivative works based on existing media, as in this fan art of Harry Potter and Severus Snape from the Harry Potter series.

The dōjinshi (self-published fan works) subculture emerged in the 1970s contemporaneously with BL subculture and Western fan fiction culture. Characteristic similarities of fan works in both Japan and the West include non-adherence to a standard narrative structures and a particular popularity of science fiction themes. Early BL dōjinshi were amateur publications that were not controlled by media restrictions, were typically derivative works based on existing manga and anime, and were often written by teenagers for an adolescent audience. Several legitimate manga artists produce or produced dōjinshi: the manga artist group Clamp began as an amateur dōjinshi circle creating yaoi works based on Saint Seiya, while Kodaka Kazuma and Fumi Yoshinaga have produced dōjinshi concurrently with professionally published works. Many publishing companies review BL dōjinshi to recruit talented amateurs; this practice has led to careers in mainstream manga for Youka Nitta, Shungiku Nakamura, and others.

Typically, BL dōjinshi feature male–male pairings from non-romantic manga and anime. Much of the material derives from male-oriented shōnen and seinen works, which contain close male–male friendships perceived by fans to imply elements of homoeroticism, such as with Captain Tsubasa and Saint Seiya, two titles which popularised yaoi in the 1980s. Weekly Shonen Jump is known to have a large female readership who engage in BL readings; publishers of shōnen manga may create "homoerotic-themed" merchandise as fan service to their BL fans. BL fans may "ship" any male–male pairing, sometimes pairing off a favourite character, or create a story about two original male characters and incorporate established characters into the story. Any male character may become the subject of a BL dōjinshi, including characters from non-manga titles such as The Lord of the Rings, video games such as Final Fantasy, or real people such as actors and politicians. Amateur authors may also create characters out of personifications of abstract concepts (as in the personification of countries in Hetalia: Axis Powers) or complementary objects like salt and pepper. In Japan, the labelling of BL dōjinshi is typically composed of the two lead characters' names, separated by a multiplication sign, with the seme being first and the uke being second.

Outside of Japan, the 2000 broadcast of Mobile Suit Gundam Wing in North America on Cartoon Network is noted as crucial to the development of Western BL fan works, particularly fan fiction. As BL fan fiction is often compared to the Western fan practice of slash, it is important to understand the subtle differences between them. Levi notes that "the youthful teen look that so easily translates into androgyny in boys' love manga, and allows for so many layered interpretations of sex and gender, is much harder for slash writers to achieve."

=== English-language publishing ===
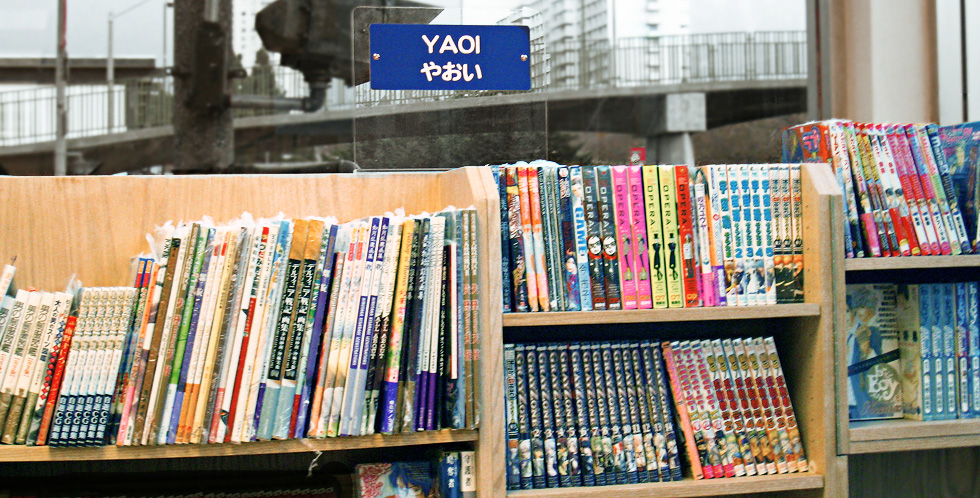
Shelves of BL books and magazines at Books Kinokuniya in San Francisco in 2009

The first officially licensed English-language translations of yaoi manga were published in the North American market in 2003. By 2006, there were roughly 130 English-translated yaoi works commercially available, and by 2007, over 10 publishers in North America published yaoi. Notable English-language publishers of BL include Viz Media under their SuBLime imprint, Digital Manga Publishing under their 801 Media and Juné imprints, Media Blasters under their Kitty Media imprint, Seven Seas Entertainment, and Tokyopop. Notable defunct English-language publishers of BL include Central Park Media under their Be Beautiful imprint, Broccoli under their Boysenberry imprint, and Aurora Publishing under their Deux Press imprint.

Among the 135 yaoi manga published in North America between 2003 and 2006, 14% were rated for readers aged 13 years or over, 39% were rated for readers aged 15 or older, and 47% were rated for readers age 18 and up. Restrictions among American booksellers often led publishers to label books conservatively, often rating books originally intended for a mid-teen readership as 18+ and distributing them in shrinkwrap. Diamond Comic Distributors valued the sales of yaoi manga in the United States at approximately US$6 million in 2007.

Marketing was significant in the transnational travel of BL from Japan to the United States, and led to BL to attract a following of LGBTQ fans in the United States. The 1994 original video animation adaptation of Kizuna: Bonds of Love was distributed by Ariztical Entertainment, which specializes in LGBT cinema and marketed the title as "the first gay male anime to be released on DVD in the US." The film was reviewed in the American LGBT magazine The Advocate, which compared the film to gay art house cinema.

A large portion of Western fans choose to pirate BL material because they are unable or unwilling to obtain it through sanctioned methods. Scanlations and other fan translation efforts of both commercially published Japanese works and amateur dojinshi are common.

==== Original English-language yaoi ====
When yaoi initially gained popularity in the United States in the early 2000s, several American artists began creating original English-language manga for female readers featuring male–male couples referred to as "American yaoi". The first known commercially published original English-language yaoi comic is Sexual Espionage #1 by Daria McGrain, published by Sin Factory in May 2002. As international artists began creating yaoi works, the term "American yaoi" fell out of use and was replaced by terms like "original English language yaoi", "global yaoi", and "global BL". The majority of publishers creating original English-language yaoi manga are now defunct, including Yaoi Press, DramaQueen, and Iris Print. Digital Manga Publishing last published original English-language yaoi manga in 2012; outside of the United States, German publisher Carlsen Manga also published original yaoi works.

=== Audio dramas ===
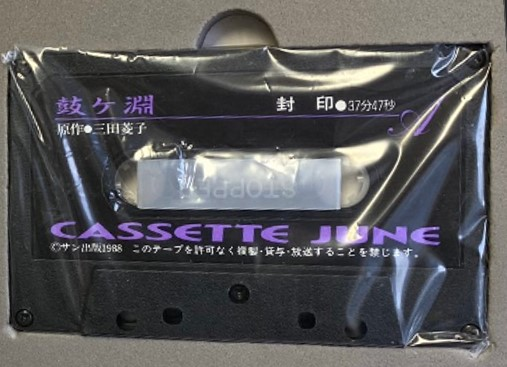
Tsuzumigafuchi, the first yaoi audio drama, was released on cassette in 1988.

BL audio dramas, occasionally referred to as "drama CDs", "sound dramas", or "BLCDs", are recorded voice performances of male–male romance scenarios performed by primarily male voice actors. They are typically adaptations of original BL manga and novels. The first BL audio dramas were released in the 1980s, beginning with Tsuzumigafuchi in 1988, which was published as a "June cassette". BL audio dramas proliferated beginning in the 1990s with the rise in popularity of compact discs, peaking at 289 total CDs released in 2008, which dropped to 108 CDs in 2013.

=== Live-action television and film ===
==== Japan ====
While Japanese BL manga has been adapted into live-action films and television dramas since the early 2000s, these works were marketed towards a niche audience of BL fans rather than towards a general audience. When these works were adapted for a general audience, same-sex romance elements were typically downplayed or removed entirely, as in the live-action television adaption of Antique Bakery that aired on Fuji TV in 2001. The development of Japanese live-action television dramas that focus on BL and same-sex romance themes explicitly was spurred by the critical and commercial success of the TV Asahi television drama Ossan's Love (2016), which features an all-male love triangle as its central plot conceit. While Ossan's Love is an original series, it influenced the creation of live-action BL works adapted from manga that are marketed towards mass audiences; notable examples include the television dramas The Novelist (2018) on Fuji TV, What Did You Eat Yesterday? (2019) on TV Tokyo, (Note: While What Did You Eat Yesterday? is not a BL series, it is often discussed in the context of live-action BL media as it focuses on a gay male couple and series creator Fumi Yoshinaga has authored multiple BL and BL-influenced works, notably Antique Bakery.) Cherry Magic (2020) on TV Tokyo, and the live-action film adaptation of The Cornered Mouse Dreams of Cheese (2020).

In 2020, the BL market was worth US$1.85 million in Japan. In 2022, Kadokawa Corporation employee Kaoru Azuma established Tunku, Kadokawa's label for publishing live-action BL drama series, partnering with MBS TV to create the programming block Drama Shower. The label was created to promote Japanese BL dramas based on existing BL novels and manga due to the growing popularity of BL caused by Ossan's Love. While creating Tunku, Azuma stated that she noticed that prejudice against boys' love has dwindled, and that many people have seemed to accept the genre as "normal".

==== Thailand ====
The Thai romantic drama film Love of Siam (2007), which features a gay male romance storyline, found unexpected mainstream success upon its release and grossed over TH฿40 million at the box office. This was followed by Love Sick (2014–2015), the first Thai television series to feature two gay characters as the lead roles. Cultural anthropologist Thomas Baudinette argues that Love Sick represented a "watershed moment" in the depiction of queer romance in Thai media, exploring how the series adapted tropes from Japanese BL to create a new genre of media. While Japanese BL manga attracted an audience in Thailand as early as the 1990s, the success of Love of Siam and Love Sick kickstarted the production of domestic BL dramas: between 2014 and 2020, 57 television series in the BL genre were produced and released in Thailand.

Major producers of Thai BL include GMMTV, a subsidiary of GMM Grammy, which has produced 2gether: The Series (2020), A Tale of Thousand Stars (2021), SOTUS (2016–2017), Dark Blue Kiss (2019), and Theory of Love (2019); and Line Corporation, which produces BL dramas in Thailand for distribution on its Line TV platform. The genre has seen some backlash from conservative elements in Thai society: in 2020, the National Broadcasting and Telecommunications Commission introduced new guidelines around material containing "sexually explicit or suggestive" scenes, while public broadcaster MCOT cancelled the BL series Love by Chance in 2018. Thai BL dramas are noted as having gained popularity in Indonesia, where LGBT representation in domestic television is less common; as well as in the Philippines, where many fans view BL as an originally Thai form of popular culture. The coming-of-age BL series, I Told Sunset About You (2020) was awarded by the Seoul International Drama Awards as the International Drama of the Year in 2021. It has been suggested that BL dramas could become a source of Thai cultural soft power in Southeast Asia and beyond.

==== China ====
There are no specific censorship policies in China concerning depictions of LGBT subject material in media; nevertheless, Variety reports that such material is "deemed sensitive and is inconsistently but regularly removed" from distribution. Addicted (2016), the first Chinese BL web series, accumulated 10 million views before being pulled from the streaming platform iQiyi. In reaction to state censorship, Chinese BL works typically depict male–male romance as homoerotic subtext: the web novel Guardian (2012) depicted a romance between its two male lead characters, though when it was adapted into a television drama on the streaming platform Youku in 2018, the relationship was rendered as a close, homoerotic friendship. The 2015 BL xianxia novel Grandmaster of Demonic Cultivation was adapted into an animated series in 2018 and a live-action series in 2019, both of which similarly revise the nature of the relationship between the lead male characters. Consequently, fans of both Guardian and The Untamed discussed the series' male homoerotic content under the hashtag "socialist brotherhood" or "socialist bromance" to avoid detection from state censors.

==== Other countries ====
In South Korea, the web series Where Your Eyes Linger launched as the first domestically produced BL series in 2020. The BL genre didn't receive much traction in the country until 2022, when the series Semantic Error achieved a major domestic success and became a social phenomenon in South Korea. The unexpected success of the series introduced the BL genre to the mainstream South Korean audience, which subsequently resulted in a rising production of South Korean BL dramas and films.

In the Philippines, BL television dramas gained popularity through the broadcast of foreign BL dramas such as 2gether and Where Your Eyes Linger. This spurred the creation of domestically produced BL dramas, such as Gameboys (2020), Hello Stranger (2020), and Oh, Mando! (2020); the 2020 film The Boy Foretold by the Stars billed itself as "the first Filipino BL movie".

In Taiwan, the BL anthology series HIStory premiered in 2017. The Canadian sports romance series Heated Rivalry has been considered as a Western adaptation of BL.

=== Video games ===
BL video games typically consist of visual novels or eroge oriented around male–male couples. The first BL game to receive an officially licensed English-language release was Enzai: Falsely Accused, published by JAST USA in 2006. That same year, the company published Absolute Obedience, while Hirameki International licensed Animamundi; the later game, although already nonexplicit, was censored for US release to achieve a "mature" rather than "adults only" ESRB rating, removing some of both the sexual and the violent content. Compared to BL manga, fewer BL games have been officially translated into English; the lack of interest by publishers in licensing further titles has been attributed to widespread copyright infringement of both licensed and unlicensed games.

== Demography ==
Suzuki notes that "demographic analyses of BL media are underdeveloped and thus much needed in yaoi/BL studies," but acknowledges that "the overwhelming majority of BL readers are women." 80% of the BL audience is female, while the membership of Yaoi-Con, a now-defunct American yaoi convention, was 85% female. It is usually assumed that all female fans are heterosexual, but in Japan there is a presence of lesbian manga authors and lesbian, bisexual or questioning female readers. A 2008 survey of English-speaking readers of BL indicated that 50%–60% of female readers self-identify as heterosexual.

Although the genre is marketed to and consumed primarily by girls and women, there is a gay, bisexual, and heterosexual male readership as well. A 2007 survey of BL readers among patrons of a United States library found about one quarter of respondents were male; two online surveys found approximately 10% of the broader English-speaking BL readership were male. Lunsing suggests that younger Japanese gay men who are offended by "pornographic" content in gay men's magazines may prefer to read BL instead. Some gay men, however, are put off by the feminine art style or unrealistic depictions of LGBT culture in Japan and instead prefer gay manga, which some perceive to be more realistic. Lunsing notes that some of the BL narrative elements criticized by homosexual men, such as rape fantasies, misogyny, and characters' non-identification as gay, are also present in gay manga.

In the mid-1990s, estimates of the size of the Japanese BL fandom ranged from 100,000 to 500,000 people. By April 2005, a search for non-Japanese websites resulted in 785,000 English, 49,000 Spanish, 22,400 Korean, 11,900 Italian, and 6,900 Chinese sites. In January 2007, there were approximately five million hits for yaoi.

Female fans of BL are often referred to as fujoshi (腐女子; lit. "rotten girl"), a derogatory insult that was later reappropriated as a self-descriptive term. The male equivalent is fudanshi (腐男子; lit. "rotten boy") or fukei (腐兄; "rotten older brother"), both of which are puns of similar construction to fujoshi.

== Analysis ==
=== Audience motivation ===
Motivations for consuming BL media include liberation from heteropatriarchy, idealised portrayal of relationships, 'pure' genderless love and pro-homosexual attitudes, identification or self-analysis, melodramatic or emotional elements, aversion to standard romances aimed at women, pure escapism, art and aesthetics, pure entertainment, and sexual excitement or titillation.

BL works, culture, and fandom have been studied and discussed by scholars and journalists worldwide, especially after translations of BL became commercially available outside Japan in the 21st century. In Manga! Manga! The World of Japanese Comics, the 1983 book by Frederik L. Schodt that was the first substantial English-language work on manga, Schodt observes that portrayals of gay male relationships had used and further developed bisexual themes already extant in shōjo manga to appeal to their female audience. Japanese critics have viewed BL as a genre that permits their audience to avoid adult female sexuality by distancing sex from their own bodies, as well as to create fluidity in perceptions of gender and sexuality and rejects "socially mandated" gender roles as a "first step toward feminism". Kazuko Suzuki, for example, believes that the audience's aversion to or contempt for masculine heterosexism is something which has consciously emerged as a result of the genre's popularity.

Mizoguchi, writing in 2003, feels that BL is a "female-gendered space", as the writers, readers, artists and most of the editors of BL are female. BL has been compared to romance novels by English-speaking librarians. In 2004, Paul Gravett summarized the dominant theories for the popularity of BL with a female audience: that Japanese women were disillusioned or bored with classic male–female relationships in fiction, that the bishōnen populating the genre were a backlash against male sex fantasies of a feminized ideal of adolescent girls, that the genre offered a safe space for sexual fantasies with the free choice of identification figure in the relationship, and that the male characters in BL are interpreted by female readers as girls, thus making the stories expressions of readers' same-sex fantasies.

Other commentators have suggested that more radical gender-political issues underlie BL. Parallels have been noted in the popularity of lesbianism in pornography, and BL has been called a form of "female fetishism". While early approaches to the popularity of the genre often referred to the role of women in patriarchal Japanese society, to which the genre offers a resistance and escape, this approach has been rejected by others who note that BL and BL-like media became popular outside of Japan in other social circumstances, such as slash fiction in the West. Against this background, theories emphasizing pleasure gained support: BL could be compared to pornography or even considered a specifically female form of pornography, appealing to desires for eroticism, voyeurism, or a desire to push against established gender roles. Mariko Ōhara, a science fiction writer, has said that she wrote Kirk/Spock fiction as a teen because she could not enjoy "conventional pornography, which had been made for men", and that she had found a "limitless freedom" in BL, much like in science fiction.

In 1998, Shihomi Sakakibara asserted that yaoi fans, including himself, were gay transgender men. Sandra Buckley believes that bishōnen narratives champion "the imagined potentialities of alternative [gender] differentiations", while James Welker described the bishōnen character as "queer", commenting that manga critic Akiko Mizoguchi saw shōnen-ai as playing a role in how she herself had become a lesbian. Dru Pagliassotti sees this and the yaoi ronsō as indicating that for Japanese gay and lesbian readers, BL is not as far removed from reality as heterosexual female readers like to claim. Welker has also written that boys' love titles liberate the female audience "not just from patriarchy, but from gender dualism and heteronormativity".

=== Criticism ===
Criticism of BL has been linked to homophobia and transphobia, with criticism in the latter case often rendered as the belief that heterosexual female BL readers wish to "become BL characters". A 2019 study of the "Leaving BL" online social movement in South Korea found that it originated from feminist movements based on gender essentialism and the belief that BL is a genre where "women borrow men's bodies," ultimately resulting in the exclusion of women.

Criticism of BL is also rendered by pro-LGBTQ individuals, most notably in the yaoi ronsō or "yaoi debate" of 1992–1997 (see History above). A trope of BL that has attracted criticism is male protagonists who do not identify as gay, but are rather simply in love with each other, with Comiket co-founder Yoshihiro Yonezawa once describing BL dōjinshi as akin to "girls playing with dolls". This is said to heighten the theme of all-conquering love, but is also condemned as a means of avoiding acknowledgement of homophobia. Criticism of the stereotypically feminine behaviour of the uke has also been prominent.

Much of the criticism of BL originally rendered in the yaoi ronsō has similarly been voiced in the English-language fandom. Rachel Thorn has suggested that BL and slash fiction fans are discontented with "the standards of femininity to which they are expected to adhere and a social environment that does not validate or sympathize with that discontent".

=== Legal issues ===
BL has been the subject of disputes on legal and moral grounds. Mark McLelland suggests that BL may become "a major battlefront for proponents and detractors of 'gender free' policies in employment, education and elsewhere", while BL artist Youka Nitta has said that "even in Japan, reading boys' love isn't something that parents encourage." In Thailand, the sale of unauthorized reproductions of shōnen-ai manga to teenagers in 2001 led to media coverage and a moral panic. In 2006, an email campaign pressuring the Sakai City Central Library to remove BL works from circulation attracted national media attention, and promoted a debate over whether removal of BL works constituted a form of discrimination. In 2010, the Osaka Prefectural Government included boys' love manga among other books deemed potentially "harmful to minors" due to its sexual content, which resulted in several magazines prohibited from being sold to people under 18 years of age.

In the People's Republic of China under the general secretaryship of Xi Jinping, authors of danmei have been arrested and criminally prosecuted. Anhui TV reported that, at least 20 young female authors writing danmei novels on an online novel website were arrested in 2014. In 2018, the pseudonymous Chinese BL novel author Tianyi was sentenced to 10 1/2 years in prison under laws prohibiting the production of "obscene material for profit". In August 2021, the BL-adapted show Word of Honor was banned. The National Radio Television Administration introduced further policies in January 2022 which resulted in the cancellation of all planned BL dramas.

Zanghellini notes that due to the "characteristics of the yaoi/BL genre" of showing characters who are often underage engaging in romantic and sexual situations, child pornography laws in Australia and Canada "may lend themselves to targeting yaoi/BL work". He notes that in the UK, cartoons are exempt from child pornography laws unless they are used for child grooming.

== See also ==
- Yaoi hole
- Yaoi paddle
- Slash fiction
- Glossary of anime and manga
- Human-oriented sexualism
- LGBT rights in Japan
- Sexual minorities in Japan
- Homosexuality in Japan
- Pornography in Japan
- Tokyo Metropolitan Ordinance Regarding the Healthy Development of Youths
- Boys' Love Manga: Essays on the Sexual Ambiguity and Cross-Cultural Fandom of the Genre
- Creek (fandom)
