= Flowers (magazine) =

Japanese manga magazine

- Cover of the first issue
- Categories: Josei manga
- Frequency: Monthly
- Circulation: 17,000; (July–September 2026)
- First issue: April 27, 2002
- Company: Shogakukan
- Country: Japan
- Language: Japanese
- Website: flowers.shogakukan.co.jp

Flowers (Japanese: フラワーズ, Hepburn: Furawāzu) is a monthly Japanese josei manga magazine published by Shogakukan and issued on the 28th of every month. Flowers has 3 spin-off publications: Weekly &Flower, Weekly Mobile Flower, and the semi-monthly Betsucomi Flower manga magazines.

== History ==
Flowers originally started out under the name Petit Flower (プチフラワー, Puchifurawā), which was also published by Shogakukan. Petit Flower was founded in 1980 as a quarterly magazine, eventually becoming monthly and then ultimately bi-monthly, and became defunct in March 2002. It was relaunched as the monthly Flowers in April 2002, which, to increase circulation, incorporated such popular Betsucomi serials as Yasha and 7 Seeds with previous Petit Flower titles. Before ceasing publication, Petit Flower serialized a number of works by Moto Hagio, including Iguana Girl, Mesh, Marginal, and A Cruel God Reigns.

== Serializations ==
=== Current ===
- Hatsukoi no Sekai by Keiko Nishi (since 2016)
- Boku no Giovanni by Hozumi (since 2016)
- The Seven Knights of the Marronnier Kingdom by Nao Iwamoto (since 2016)
- Fushigi Yûgi: Byakko Senki by Yuu Watase (since 2017)
- Don't Call It Mystery by Yumi Tamura (since 2017)
- Ao no Hana, Utsuwa no Mori by Yuki Kodama (since 2018)
- Kaguya Den by Chiho Saito (since 2018)
- Sūji de Asobo by Murako Kinuta (since 2018)
- Poe no Ichizoku: Himitsu no Hanazono by Moto Hagio (since 2019)
- Utagawa Hyakkei by Akimi Yoshida (since 2019)
- Black Rose Alice: D.C. al fine by Setona Mizushiro (since 2020)

=== Former ===
- Yasha by Akimi Yoshida (2002) (Note: Yasha was originally serialized in Bessatsu Shōjo Comic from 1996 to 2002. It then moved to Flowers, where it ended in 2002.)
- Kaze Hikaru by Taeko Watanabe (2002–2020) (Note: Kaze Hikaru was originally serialized in Bessatsu Shōjo Comic from 1997 to 2002. It then moved to Flowers, where it ended in 2020.)
- Amakusa 1637 by Michiyo Akaishi (2002–2006) (Note: Amakusa 1637 was originally serialized in Petit Flower from 2000 to 2002. It then moved to Flowers, where it ended in 2006.)
- 7 Seeds by Yumi Tamura (2002–2017) (Note: 7 Seeds was originally serialized in Bessatsu Shōjo Comic from 2001 to 2002. It then moved to Flowers, where it ended in 2017.)
- Otherworld Barbara by Moto Hagio (2002–2005)
- Eve no Nemuri by Akimi Yoshida (2003–2005)
- Tōmei Ningen no Shissō by Sakumi Yoshino
- Polar Bear Café by Aloha Higa (2006–2014)
- Umimachi Diary by Akimi Yoshida (2006–2018)
- Machi de Uwasa no Tengu no Ko by Nao Iwamoto (2007–2013)
- Kids on the Slope by Yuki Kodama (2007–2012)
- Otoko no Isshō by Keiko Nishi (2008–2009)
- Girls Bijutsu by Machiko Kyō (2010–2011)
- Ane no Kekkon by Keiko Nishi (2010–2014)
- Shitsuren Chocolatier by Setona Mizushiro (2010–2014) (Note: Shitsuren Chocolatier was originally serialized in Rinka from 2008 to 2010. It then moved to Flowers, where it ended in 2014.)
- Nanohana by Moto Hagio (one-shot collection; 2011–2012) (Note: Nanohana is a single-volume collection of five one-shots by Moto Hagio, originally published in Flowers in 2011 and 2012.)
- Shiki no Zenjitsu by Hozumi (one-shot collection; 2011–2012) (Note: Shiki no Zenjitsu is a single-volume collection of six one-shots by Hozumi. Two were originally published in Rinka in 2010 and 2011; the remaining four were published in Flowers in 2011 and 2012.)
- Torikae Baya by Chiho Saito (2012–2017)
- Sayonara Sorcier by Hozumi (2012–2013)
- Away by Moto Hagio (2013–2015)
- Gold Kingdom and Water Kingdom by Nao Iwamoto (2014–2016)
- Usemono Yado by Hozumi (2014–2015)
- Katsu Curry no Hi by Keiko Nishi (2014–2015)
- Poe no Ichizoku: Haru no Yume by Moto Hagio (2016–2017)
- Revolutionary Girl Utena: After the Revolution by Chiho Saito (2017–2018)
- Poe no Ichizoku: Unicorn by Moto Hagio (2018–2019)
