= A Drunken Dream and Other Stories =

Japanese manga anthology by Moto Hagio

- Cover art from A Drunken Dream and Other Stories, as published by Fantagraphics
- Manga
- Written by: Moto Hagio
- Published by: Shogakukan
- English publisher: NA: Fantagraphics
- Published: August 2010
- Volumes: 1

A Drunken Dream and Other Stories is a Japanese manga anthology written and illustrated by Moto Hagio, collecting a variety of her short stories originally from 1970 to 2007.

== Publication ==
The stories were selected by translator Rachel Matt Thorn to be an introduction to Hagio for English speakers, with the input of a mixi fan club for Hagio. The anthology also contains an interview with the author, and an article about the Year 24 Group, which Hagio belongs to. Both supporting articles were excerpted from articles originally published in The Comics Journal #269. To launch the book, Hagio attended Comic-Con 2010. The manga is presented in unflipped format and the article about the Year 24 Group and the interview with Moto Hagio are presented as appendices in the left of the book, reading from left to right.

=== Volume list ===
No.	Release date	ISBN
	August 2010	978-1-60699-377-4
"Bianca" (1970, 16 pages); "Girl on Porch with Puppy" (1971, 12 pages); "Autumn Journey" (1971, 24 pages); "Marié, Ten Years Later" (1977, 16 pages); "A Drunken Dream" (1980, 21 pages); "Hanshin: Half-God" (1984, 16 pages); "Angel Mimic" (1984, 50 pages); "Iguana Girl" (1991, 50 pages); "The Child Who Comes Home" (1998, 24 pages); "The Willow Tree" (2007, 20 pages)

Original place of publication:

Title	# of pages	Original publication	Date
"Bianca" (ビアンカ, Bianka)	16	Shōjo Friend, Special Issue No. 5	1970
"Girl on Porch with Puppy" (ポーチで少女が小犬と, Pōchi de Shōjo ga Koinu to)	12	COM	January 1971
"Autumn Journey" (秋の旅, Aki no Tabi)	24	Bessatsu Shōjo Comic	October 1971
"Marié, Ten Years Later" (十年目の毬絵, Jūnenme no Marie)	16	Big Comic Original	20 March 1977
"A Drunken Dream" (酔夢, Suimu)	21	Newly drawn for "Kingin Suna Kishi" (artbook)	1980
"Hanshin: Half-God" (半神)	16	Petit Flower	January 1984
"Angel Mimic" (天使の擬態, Tenshi no Gitai)	50	Petit Flower	November 1984
"Iguana Girl" (イグアナの娘, Iguana no Musume)	50	Petit Flower	May 1991
"The Child Who Comes Home" (帰ってくる子, Kattekuru Ko)	24	Child – Igyou Collection No. 7	1998
"The Willow Tree" (柳の木, Yanagi no Ki)	20	flowers	May 2007

== Reception ==
Katherine Dacey describes "Bianca" as a "lovely, unabashedly Romantic story" and as "a meditation on artistic inspiration". Dacey notes that other stories in the book "explore the complexity of familial relationships". Dacey praised Hagio's ability to "make the ineffable speak through pictures". Snow Wildsmith praised the flow of the anthology and felt the anthology's theme was that of connections between people, recommending it to fans of Fumi Yoshinaga and Mitsukazu Mihara. Wildsmith praised the details in Hagio's art, and felt that the art dated well. Publishers Weekly felt Hagio's works were more restrained and subtle than modern shōjo manga, saying that this reflects Hagio's wisdom and "creative strength". Lissa Pattillo describes the anthology as "a mature collection of stories that aims to provoke thought and feeling and succeeds endearingly". Thomas Zoth describes the presentation of the book as "part textbook, and part holy book". His only complaint about the presentation of the book is that he found the font choice reminiscent of The Simpsons. Joe McCulloch feels that the title story is "more interested in evoking sensations of exquisite heartache and romantic frustration than delineating psychological realism or building suspense". Nicole Rudick feels that "The theme of spiritual crisis runs throughout Hagio's stories—from the mundane ('Angel') to the surreal ('Hanshin: Half-God') to the phantasmagoric ('A Drunken Dream')". David Welsh found it easy to sympathise with Hagio's heroes. Noah Berlatsky disliked the first four stories, suggesting that Hagio's characterisations are poor, and that a fantasy or science fiction setting can help to distract from this.

The volume has been nominated for an Eisner Award.
