= Nanohana (manga) =

Manga series by Moto Hagio

- Cover of the first edition tankōbon

なのはな
- Genre: Science fiction; Coming-of-age
- Created by: Moto Hagio
- Manga

Nanohana; Pluto Fujin; Ame no Yoru: Uranus Hakushaku; Salome 20XX
- Published by: Shogakukan
- Imprint: Flower Comics Special
- Magazine: Monthly Flowers
- Original run: June 28, 2011 – January 28, 2012
- Volumes: 1
- Manga

Fukushima Drive
- Published by: Shogakukan
- Imprint: Big Comic Special
- Magazine: Big Comic
- Published: October 25, 2013

Nanohana (なのはな; transl. "Rapeseed Blossoms" or "Cole Flowers") is a Japanese manga anthology written and illustrated by Moto Hagio. Published from 2011 to 2012 in the manga magazine Monthly Flowers, the series is a collection of one-shots on nuclear power and the Fukushima Daiichi nuclear disaster. Noted as one of the first works on the incident published in Japan, the series focuses on a message of hope in the face of the disaster, while also being a satire that is critical of nuclear power. Nanohana was critically acclaimed upon its release, with Hagio winning a Lifetime Achievement Award at the Sense of Gender Awards for the series in 2012. A theatrical adaptation of the series was staged in 2019.

== Synopsis ==
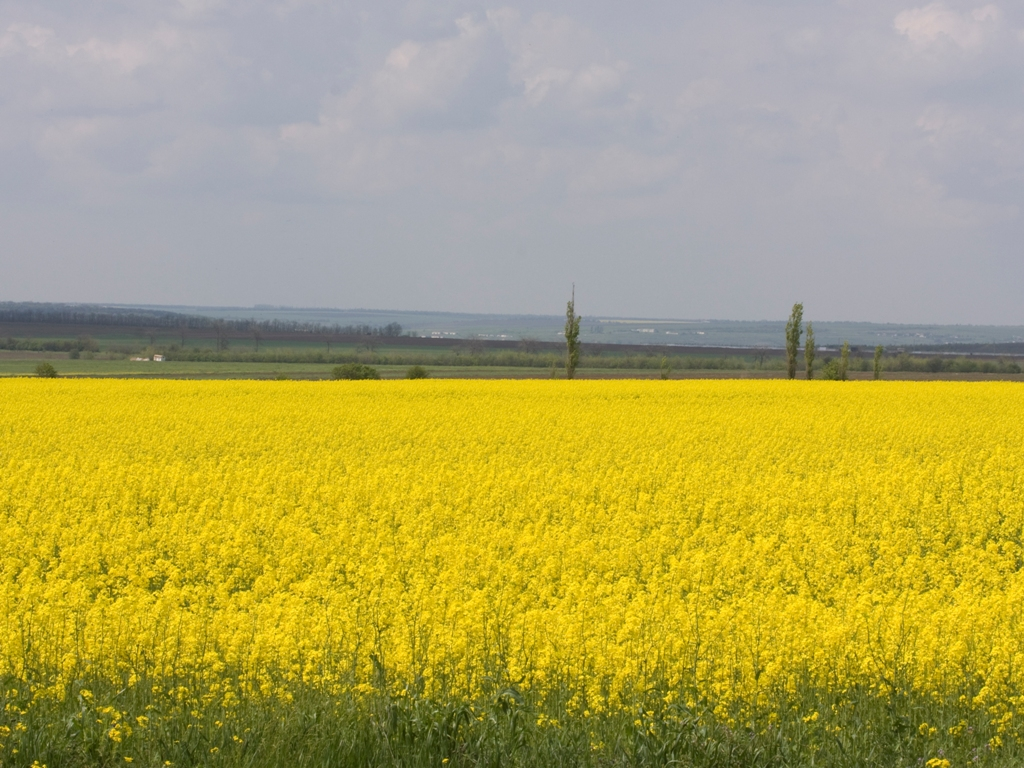
A rapeseed field in Ukraine

The series consists of five one-shots: the titular duology whose parts open and close the series, and the "personification of radiation" trilogy. A sixth one-shot, Fukushima Drive, was published in a special anthology edition of Big Comic before being published in the second edition release of the tankōbon (collected edition) of the series.

=== Nanohana duology ===
Nanohana (なのはな)
12-year-old Naho and her family are displaced as a result of the Tōhoku earthquake and tsunami and subsequent nuclear disaster in Fukushima. The family is safe with the exception of Naho's grandmother; when Naho acknowledges her grandmother's absence, her family hastily changes the subject. It is revealed that in her youth, Naho's grandmother helped victims of the Chernobyl disaster, including a Ukrainian girl who planted rapeseed in the hope that the plant would absorb radionuclides from the contaminated soil. Naho has a dream about Chernobyl, her grandmother, and the Ukrainian girl, and decides that she too will help Fukushima by planting rapeseed.
Nanohana – Gensō: Ginga Tetsudō no Yoru (なのはな－幻想『銀河鉄道の夜』, Nanohana – Fantasy: Night on the Galactic Railroad)
After reading her mother's copy of Night on the Galactic Railroad, Naho dreams that she is traveling with her older brother on a train that crosses the Milky Way, where she meets her grandmother. The dream allows Naho to accept her grandmother's death and mourn her.

=== "Personification of radiation" trilogy ===
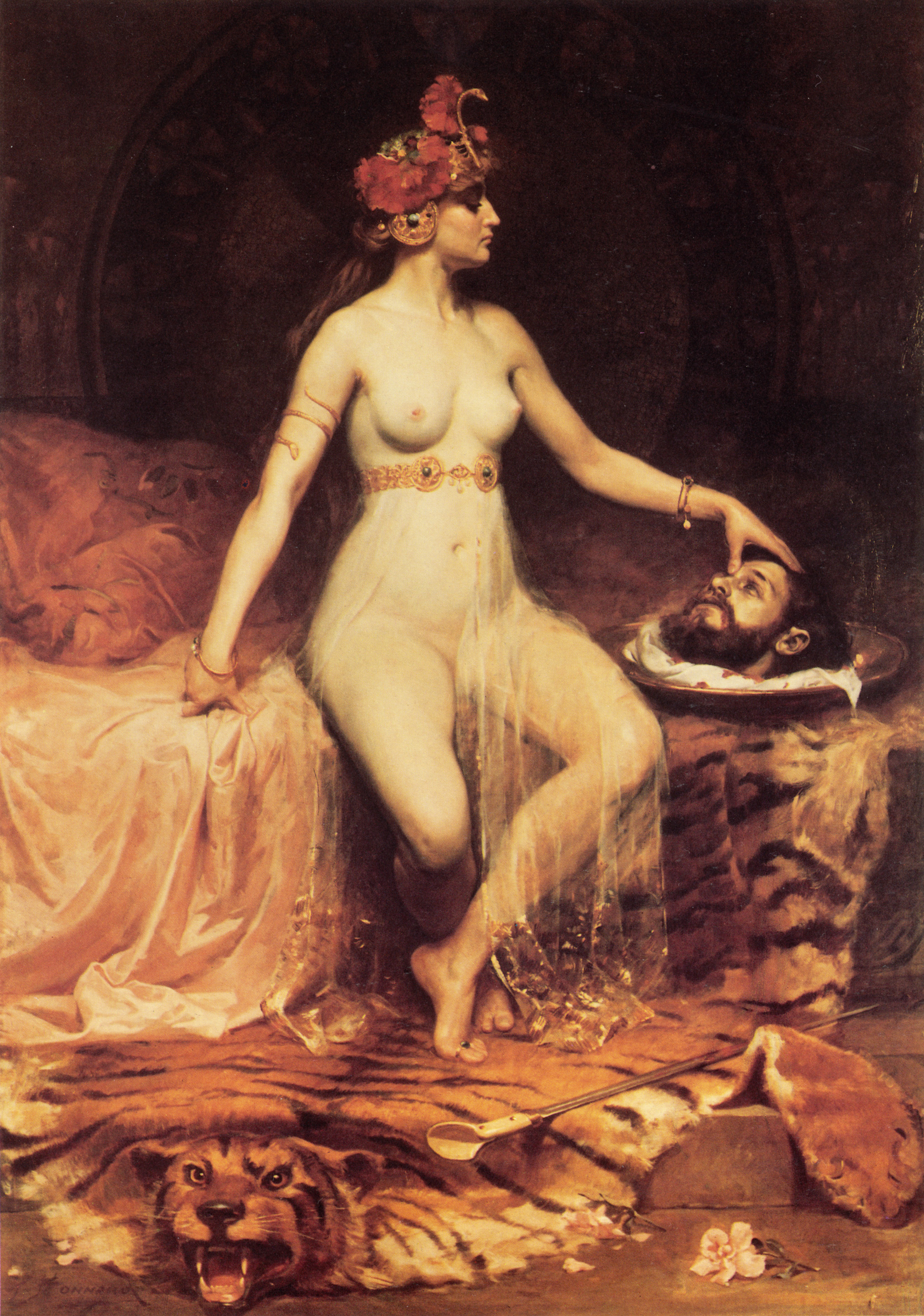
The frontispiece for Salome 20XX depicts Salome with the head of Yohanan, as in this painting by Pierre Bonnaud.

Pluto Fujin (プルート夫人, Madame Pluto)
Madame Pluto, the anthropomorphic embodiment of plutonium, is judged by an assembly of men. Pluto attempts to seduce the assembly, but is unsuccessful; although she loses the case, she proves to be uncontrollable, and her colossal half-life causes the judges to die of old age. Pluto finds herself alone in a devastated world, and professes her love for humanity.
Ame no Yoru: Uranus Hakushaku (雨の夜 -ウラノス伯爵-, A Rainy Night: Count Uranus)
Count Uranus, the anthropomorphic embodiment of uranium, visits a bourgeois Japanese family to convince them of the benefits of nuclear power. Uranus uses his charm and rhetoric of love, peace, and prosperity to convince the family; the sole opposition is the grandfather, who still recalls the atomic bombings of Hiroshima and Nagasaki, and daughter Ann, who makes an environmentalist argument against nuclearization. When the grandfather attempts to kill Uranus, Ann intervenes to declare her love for Uranus. Finally convinced, the family departs to follow Uranus, abandoning the grandfather for death; Ann has a pang of doubt over whether her decision was correct.
Salome 20XX (サロメ 20XX)
An adaptation of Oscar Wilde's play Salome that depicts Salome as a cabaret dancer who performs for wealthy Japanese industrialists while dreaming of her true love Yohanan. When Yohanan arrives, he is accompanied by men who imprison Salome on the charge that she is plutonium. Locked in prison, Salome performs the dance of the seven veils, which causes a nuclear explosion.

=== Fukushima Drive ===
Fukushima Drive (福島ドライヴ)
An adaptation of the song "Tachikawa Drive" by Yoshihiro Kai, a requiem composed by the artist following the death of a friend. Using only the lyrics to the song as prose, the manga tells the story of three friends from Fukushima; one of the friends is estranged from the two others, and is in Tokyo when the earthquake strikes. Distraught, he drives through country roads, waiting for a call from his friends.

== Production ==
=== Context ===
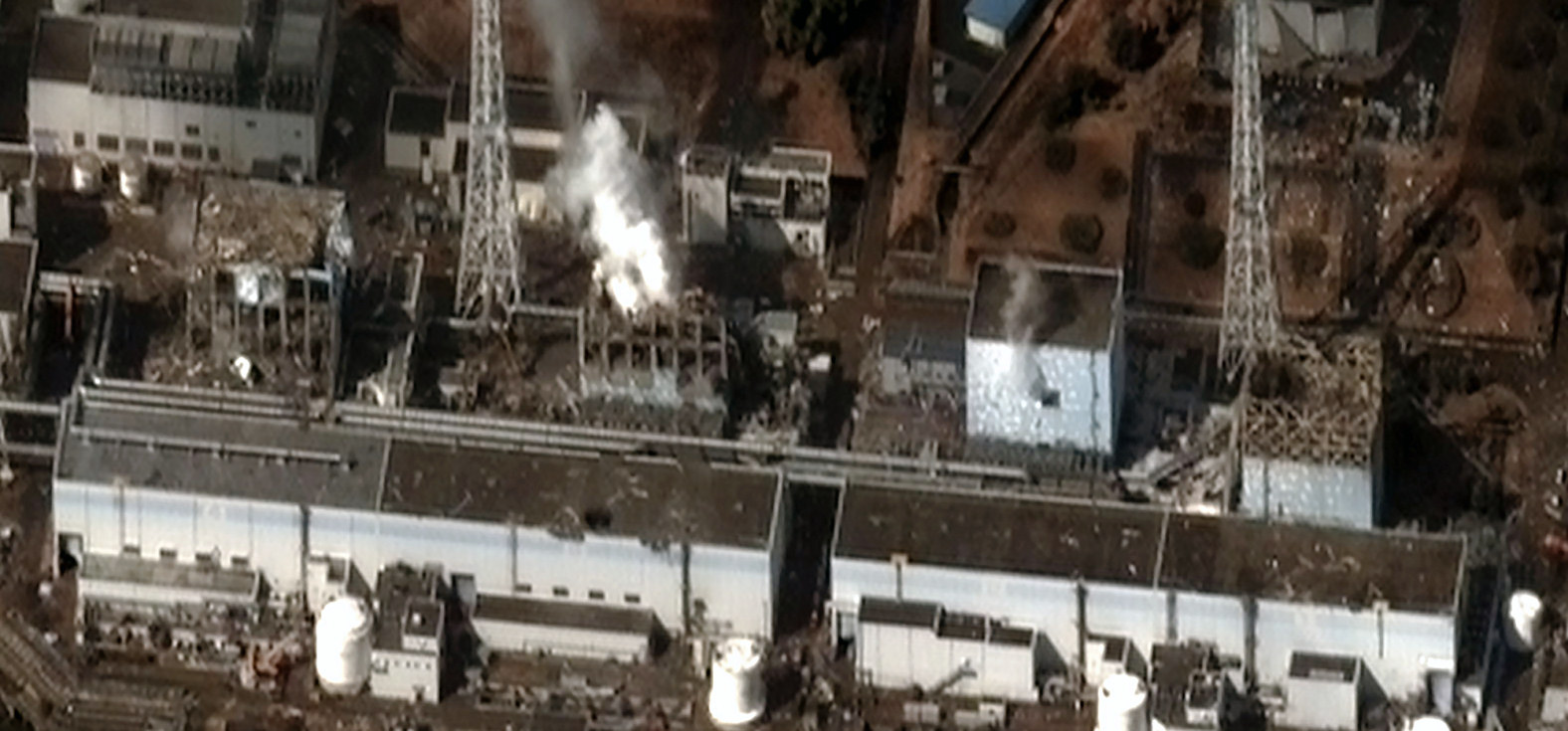
The Fukushima Daiichi Nuclear Power Plant during the disaster

On March 11, 2011, an earthquake off the Pacific coast of Tōhoku caused a powerful tsunami that impacted the Miyagi, Iwate, and Fukushima prefectures. The disaster led to failures at the Fukushima Daiichi Nuclear Power Plant, and caused the Fukushima Daiichi nuclear disaster.

At the time of the disaster, manga artist Moto Hagio was living in Saitama Prefecture. She had been working on her long-running one-shot manga series Koko de wa Nai: Dokoka (ここではない★どこ, lit. Anywhere But Here) since 2006, but found herself unable to create new chapters due to writer's block. Finding little reassurance in government messaging stating that the disaster was under control, she began to investigate the history and operation of nuclear power plants from Marie Curie's initial work on radioactivity. This investigation led her to understand that the disaster was far more serious than government messaging suggested.

Though Hagio had depicted social and political issues in her manga in the past, it was typically in the context of science fiction and fantasy narratives. Previously, the only work in which she had depicted a political topic directly was her 1971 one-shot Katappo no Furugutsu (かたっぽのふるぐつ, lit. One Pair of Old Shoes), which depicts a character with asthma caused by air pollution. Hagio described the experience of creating works depicting political problems "very painful" because "the problem was never solved," but stated that "I used to created a candy-coated psychological world of fantasies, but I could not believe the beautiful fantasy anymore after the events of the earthquake and nuclear crisis of Fukushima."

=== First edition ===
In April 2011, Hagio learned about the practice of phytoremediation, or the use of rapeseed and other plants to absorb radionuclides as a form of environmental remediation; the practice was implemented in Chernobyl following the Chernobyl nuclear disaster, as well as in Fukushima. The story of the Nanohana one-shot was inspired by an image Hagio pictured of a Ukrainian girl and a Japanese girl standing in a rapeseed field with the Fukushima Daiichi Nuclear Power Plant in the distance, as the Ukrainian girl hands the Japanese girl a seed drill; this image became the climactic scene of the one-shot. During the development of the Nanohana one-shot, Hagio conceived of a science fiction trilogy focused on anthropomorphized radioactive elements.

Nanohana and the trilogy were published in the manga magazine Monthly Flowers from June 28, 2011, to January 28, 2012, as part of Hagio's Koko de wa Nai series. The series was published by Shogakukan as a hardcover volume in March 2012, independently from the Koko de wa Nai series; the hardcover also includes the Nanohana – Gensō sequel.

=== Second edition ===
In commemoration of the 45th anniversary of its manga magazine Big Comic in 2013, Shogakukan began publishing Tensaitachi no Kyōen (天才たちの競演, lit. The Recital Contest of the Geniuses), a two-volume anthology of one-shots drawn by the publisher's most famous and celebrated manga artists. Hagio contributed Fukushima Drive to the anthology, which was published in Big Comic on October 25, 2013. The second edition hardcover, published by Shogakukan on March 15, 2016, includes Fukushima Drive as a concluding story.

=== International release ===
In 2015, the academic journal Mechademia published a special issue focused on "world renewal" in response to the Fukushima nuclear disaster. The issue includes the Nanohana one-shot, translated into English by Rachel Thorn and Frenchy Lunning. With Hagio's consent, the translation uses Scottish accents to indicate the Tōhoku dialect spoken by certain characters in the story. The March 7, 2012 issue of the French newspaper Courrier International dedicated to the first anniversary of the Fukushima nuclear disaster uses an illustration of Madame Pluto as its cover.

== Analysis ==
Manga researcher Yukari Fujimoto notes that responses to the Fukushima nuclear disaster in manga vary depending on the work's demographic group. Manga aimed at a male audience (shōnen and seinen) approaches the disaster from a social and technical perspective, while manga aimed at a female audience (shōjo and josei) focuses on the impact the disaster has on character's lives, and the choices they face because of it. Nanohana is no exception to this trend, though because its chapters were published across multiple magazines that are aimed at different demographics, it does not strictly conform to one specific demographic.

=== Style ===
==== Nanohana duology ====
Both Nanohana stories begin with a simple panel layout that utilizes a succession of rectangular boxes, a standard practice in seinen manga. As the story progresses to the dreamlike sequences of Naho's interior monologue, the panels become looser; the structured panels of the Fukushima sequences are juxtaposed against the ethereal and fanciful page layouts of the dream sequences, where borders are drawn with dotted lines. These dream sequences are congruent with visual conventions typical of shōjo manga, notably in the use of floral decorations surrounding panels that depict rapeseed blooms, sacred lotuses, cherry blossoms, and golden lilies. These sequences also have minimal dialogue and leave the emotions and feelings of the characters to audience interpretation, another convention of shōjo manga.

==== "Personification of radiation" trilogy ====
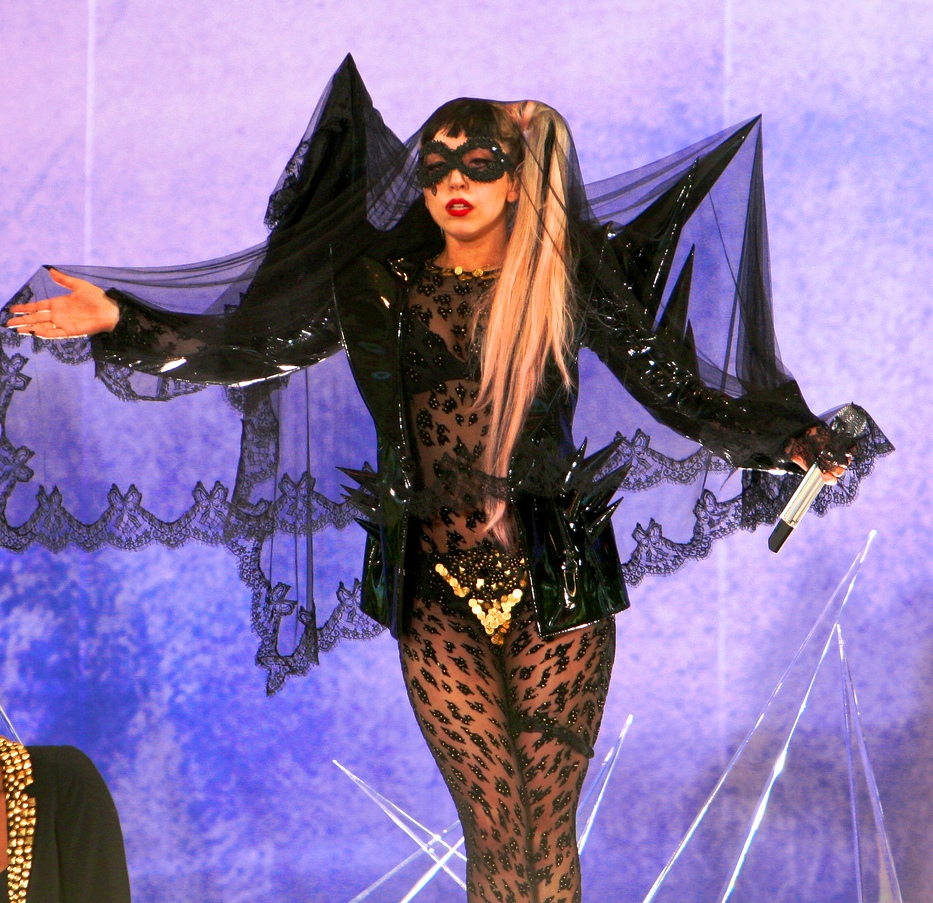
Pop singer Lady Gaga was used as a model for Madame Pluto.

The "personification of radiation" trilogy uses a panel layout more typical of conventional shōjo manga; its satirical tone is additionally less serious than that of both Nanohana one-shots. Hagio has stated that she was inspired by the feeling of fascination she imagined Curie and other scientists of the early 20th century felt towards radioactive elements, and chose to depict the elements as sensual and sexually desirable. Count Uranus is a bishōnen ("beautiful man") who uses his physical charms to seduce his audience, while Salome is a cabaret dancer. Madame Pluto is based on Lady Gaga and Marilyn Monroe, is often illustrated making lascivious poses, and dresses in an outfit that commentators have compared to a dominatrix or prostitute.

In shōjo manga, sexualized characters are typically depicted as "the other" who stands in contrast to the protagonist, who the reader is meant to personally identify with. They are often sexually objectified, they also serve as mediators so that readers can approach potentially "traumatic" themes and subject material with a certain distance. In Hagio's trilogy, they allow the reader to examine problems associated with nuclearization indirectly. To create distance between the readers and nuclearization, the effects of radiation are shown metaphorically, such as through polluted and sterile environments, a black sun, or a haze that takes the shape of a skull or a mushroom cloud.

==== Fukushima Drive ====
While Nanohana and the trilogy were published in a shōjo manga magazine, Fukushima Drive was published in a seinen magazine, and thus utilizes a more structured panel layout. Hagio uses only a series of compressed horizontal boxes, which critic Joe McCulloch argues "isolate the characters in their sad surroundings".

=== Position on nuclear power ===
In the afterword to the first edition of Nanohana, Hagio explains that she wished to communicate a message of hope in the wake of the Fukushima disaster while reflecting on the broader political issues, though without adopting a strong position or proposing a concrete solution. However, in subsequent interviews, Hagio has stated a firmer opposition to nuclear power, and voiced support for anti-nuclearism.

In Pluto Fujin and Ame no Yoru, the opinions expressed both for and against nuclear power echo Hagio's internal conflict on the subject. The two works are very similar: both follow a personification of a nuclear element who is judged by an assembly, and both characters use an argument based on the stability and prosperity that nuclear energy provides to defend themselves. Their arguments have been compared to speeches made by former Prime Minister of Japan Yasuhiro Nakasone, who stated that nuclear power is necessary for the development of the nation and that nuclear accidents are only a small sacrifice that must be accepted.

However, the works diverge in the gender of the personifications, and thus the judgement that is brought upon them. Margherita Long sees in this a manifestation of ecofeminist philosophy, which postulates that the subjugation of women and nature by men stem from similar mechanisms, a topic explored by Hagio in her 1978 manga series Star Red. The assemblies are immediately captivated by the beauty of both personifications, but whereas the handsome and sexually aggressive Count Uranus convinces the assembly, Madame Pluto is unable to do so, and is seen as a mere passive sexual object. Long notes that while Count Uranus is assimilated into society and thus able to transcend his state as a chemical element, Madame Pluto does not manage to transcend her status as an object; men want her to be infinitely available and infinitely docile (both as a woman and as a source of energy), but fail to control her.

== Reception and legacy ==
=== Critical response ===
Published just three months after the Fukushima disaster, Nanohana is noted as among the first creative works to address the disaster. Though it was preceded by the manga Ano-hi kara no Manga (あの日からのマンガ; lit. "Manga after 3.11") by Kotobuki Shiriagari, Hagio's fame and reputation as an artist influenced other manga artists to depict the subject in their works.

The series received generally positive reviews during its initial serialization in Monthly Flowers. The collected edition of the series received positive reviews from the Mainichi Shinbun, the Yomiuri Shimbun, and The Asahi Shimbun, with the Mainichi Shinbun praising the ability of manga to respond quickly to social issues. This largely positive reception has been compared to the public response to the manga series Oishinbo, which was placed on indefinite hiatus following controversies that arose when the series began to address the disaster. Critics who had a mixed or negative perception of Nanohana have cited the "overly hasty treatment of the topic" or the inappropriate nature of the message of hope it conveys.

=== Awards ===
In 2012, Hagio was awarded the Lifetime Achievement Award for Nanohana at the Sense of Gender Awards, which recognize Japanese science fiction and fantasy works that explore the concept of gender. In the same year, Nanohana was one of the "jury selections" by the Japan Media Arts Festival, being a runner-up for the Best Comic of 2012. In 2018, the series was awarded the Special Award at the 8th Iwate Manga Awards, which recognized works that have contributed to the promotion and reconstruction of Iwate Prefecture since the disaster. Iwate governor Takuya Tasso praised Hagio for her treatment of the subject and for depicting the novel Night on the Galactic Railroad, whose author Kenji Miyazawa is from Iwate.

=== Adaptation ===
In 2019, the theater company Studio Life adapted the Nanohana one-shot into a play. The adaptation was directed by Jun Kurata with music by Hayata Akashi, a singer from Fukushima Prefecture.
