= Iguana Girl =

Japanese manga series

- Cover of Iguana Girl, featuring Rika

イグアナの娘 (Iguana no Musume)
- Genre: Drama, fantasy
- Created by: Moto Hagio
- Manga
- Written by: Moto Hagio
- Published by: Shogakukan
- English publisher: Fantagraphics
- Magazine: Petit Flower
- Published: May 1992
- Volumes: 1
- Television drama
- Directed by: Kazuhisa Imai
- Written by: Yoshikazu Okada
- Original network: TV Asahi
- Original run: April 15, 1996 – June 24, 1996
- Episodes: 11

Iguana Girl (Japanese: イグアナの娘, Hepburn: Iguana no Musume; alternately translated as Daughter of the Iguana or Iguana Daughter) is a Japanese manga written and illustrated by Moto Hagio. A 52-page one-shot (single chapter series) originally published in the manga magazine Petit Flower in 1992, the story follows a mother who rejects her daughter because she perceives her as an iguana; the daughter internalizes this rejection, and in turn comes to regard herself as an iguana.

Iguana Girl is a semi-autobiographical story that reflects Hagio's own strained relationship with her mother, while also utilizing fantasy elements to comment on the role of women in post-war Japanese society. In 1996, Iguana Girl was adapted into a live-action television drama that aired on TV Asahi. An English-language translation of the Iguana Girl manga was included in the anthology A Drunken Dream and Other Stories, published by Fantagraphics in 2010.

== Synopsis ==
Rika Aoshima is the eldest daughter of an ordinary Japanese family in the mid-twentieth century. Though Rika is regarded by others as intelligent, athletic, and beautiful, her mother Yuriko believes that her daughter is an iguana; she frequently belittles Rika, and openly favors her youngest daughter Mami. Rika has internalized her mother's rejection and perceives herself as an iguana, and comes to believe that her true parents are iguanas in the Galápagos Islands.

Rika grows up and attends a prestigious university, where she begins dating a fellow student in her seminar named Kazuhiko. They marry once their studies have concluded, and move away from Rika's family in Tokyo to live together in Sapporo. They eventually have a daughter, though Rika finds she is unable to love her child after seeing that the baby is a human and not an iguana like herself.

Shortly thereafter, Yuriko dies suddenly from a heart attack. Upon returning home for her mother's funeral, Rika is horrified to discover that she now sees Yuriko as an iguana. Rika has a dream where she sees her mother as an iguana princess who asks a witch to turn her into a human, so that she may be with the human man she has fallen in love with. The witch agrees, but warns that the man will leave her if he discovers the truth of her identity; in response, the princess makes herself forget she was ever an iguana. The revelation helps Rika understand why her mother rejected her, and allows Rika to grieve her mother's death and express love for her daughter.

== Production ==
=== Context ===
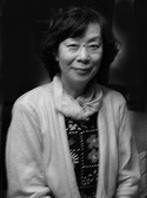
Hagio in 2008

Throughout her life, Moto Hagio has had a strained relationship with her parents, particularly her mother. Her father demanded that his children never deviate from his expectations for them, and Hagio has stated that she feared her mother as a child. Hagio found refuge from her family troubles in manga and decided to become a manga artist as an adult, a choice her parents disapproved of even after Hagio became established and acclaimed in her field. Hagio has described the act of creating manga as an "act of healing" that allows her to escape these troubles.

Prior to Iguana Girl, Hagio did not create stories set in contemporary Japan, instead preferring to create stories set in Europe (The Poe Clan, The Heart of Thomas) or science fiction stories set in outer space or other fantastical settings (They Were Eleven, Marginal). Mothers often appear in Hagio's manga as malevolent figures, with matricide occurring as a common plot point.

To resolve her familial trauma, Hagio sought to create a manga series that directly addressed her relationship with her parents. After studying family psychology for two years, she published her 1980 manga series Mesh, which focuses on a boy who sets out to kill his drug dealer father. Translator Rachel Thorn notes that Mesh was Hagio's first conscious attempt to "purge her own familial demons" through her manga, and established motifs of childhood trauma and dysfunctional families that would recur throughout her career.

=== Production and release ===
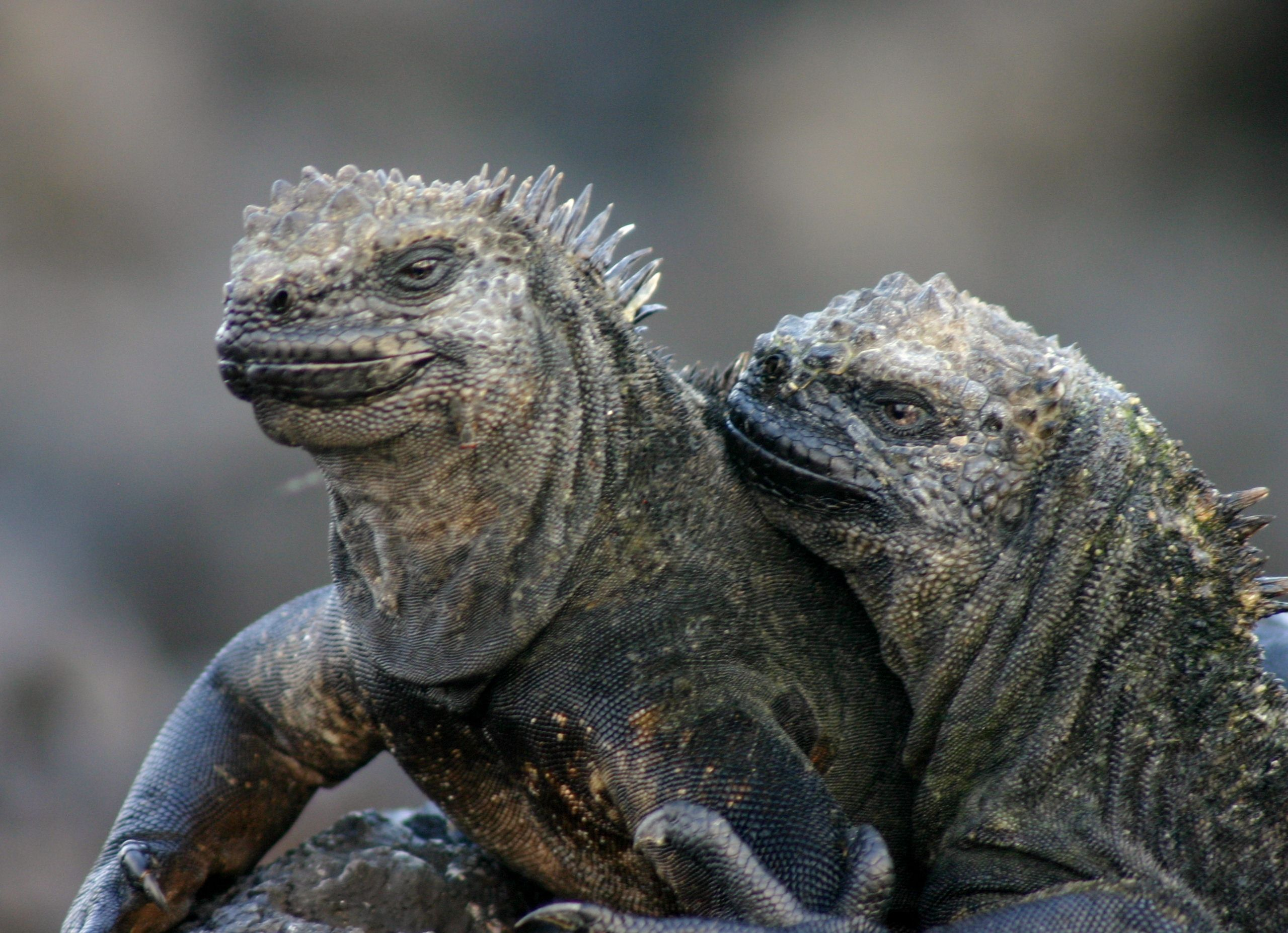
Iguana Girl was inspired by a documentary Hagio watched about marine iguanas (pictured) in the Galápagos Islands.

Hagio attempted for several years to write a story that more directly addressed her own familial issues, but found she was unable to do so without adopting a third-person perspective. After watching a documentary about marine iguanas in the Galápagos Islands, Hagio found that she identified with the iguanas, stating that she "finally came to realize that the reason why I couldn't get along well with my mother is that I'm not a human, but a marine iguana," and that she "immediately empathized and associated myself with this animal, which seemed to be lamenting its failure to become a human, just like me."

The documentary inspired Iguana Girl, which was published in the May 1992 issue of the manga magazine Petit Flower as a one-shot (single chapter series). The series deviates significantly in its subject material compared to Hagio's previous works: it is set in Japan, focuses on a mother-daughter relationship (unlike her works that typically focus on male protagonists), and features a protagonist who gives birth. Hagio began to publish stories set in Japan more frequently following the publication of Iguana Girl, though troubled mother-child relationships would continue to recur as a theme in her work; notably in her subsequent 1993 manga series A Cruel God Reigns, which focuses on a boy whose mother allows her new husband to physically and sexually abuse him.

Following its publication in Petit Flower, the manga was published by Shogakukan in two anthologies of short stories by Hagio, both titled Iguana Girl: one released in 1994, and the second released in 2000. An English-language translation of Iguana Girl was included in A Drunken Dream and Other Stories, an anthology of Hagio's works translated by Rachel Thorn and published by Fantagraphics in 2010.

== Analysis ==
Iguana Girl can be understood as both a semi-autobiographical story, as well as a story that utilizes fantasy and fairy tale elements to comment on the role of women in post-war Japanese society. Academic Tomoko Kuribayashi argues that Yuriko's inability to love her daughter can be interpreted in three ways: through a fairy tale framework, a psychoanalytic framework, and a combination of the two. As a fairy tale, the plot of Iguana Girl can be interpreted directly as a "myth about womanhood": a non-human character transforms herself into a human woman for the love of a human male (Kuribayashi notes the similarity to Hans Christian Andersen's The Little Mermaid), but fears that her daughter's appearance will expose her true animalistic nature. Kuribayashi notes that stories that associate femininity with animalistic traits as a means of depicting femininity as an uncontrollable force recur in fairy tales and folklore across diverse cultures.

As a work of psychoanalysis, Yuriko's rejection of Rika can be seen as an allegory for "the self-hatred that women develop as they attempt to fulfill impossible social expectations to be beautiful and otherwise perfect mothers, daughters, and wives." Despite reforms instituted during Japan's post-war period that provided equal educational opportunities for women, the 1950s through 1970s saw a resurgence of the pre-war "good wife, wise mother" ideology. This envisioned a gendered division of labor in which women were expected to raise children and perform domestic labor in support of the paid labor of their husbands. This prompted a generational conflict between mothers and daughters, and pushed many girls – including Hagio – to question these expectations.

By combining these interpretations, Iguana Girl can be seen as a story about how notions of femininity are imposed on girls from birth by their mothers. Yuriko prefers Mami as a daughter because she displays traits associated with traditional femininity: she is fair-skinned, enjoys girlish activities like baking, and gets average grades, in contrast to the dark-skinned, athletic, tomboyish Rika. Kuribayashi concludes that regardless of which of the three interpretations one prefers, Iguana Girl "serves as a vantage point from which to study the ways in which femininity, specifically motherhood, is culturally defined and leveraged to regulate women's behavior."

== Reception ==
Though Hagio was already widely acclaimed as a manga artist when Iguana Girl was first published in 1992, the series became a notable title in the author's bibliography; when Hagio was named as a Person of Cultural Merit in 2019, Iguana Girl was cited as a representative work by the author alongside her best-known series such as The Heart of Thomas and The Poe Clan. The series became particularly well known among the Japanese general public following its television drama adaptation in 1996.

In Japan, Iguana Girl attracted particular attention from child psychologists; in 2009, Hagio was interviewed about Iguana Girl by psychologist Sayoko Nobuta in the women's magazine Fujin Koron. Critic Kōtarō Iizawa favorably compared the art style of the anthropomorphic characters in Iguana Girl to the artwork of manga artist Yumiko Ōshima. Writing for The New York Times, George Gustines described Iguana Girl as "oddly appealing and surprisingly bittersweet", with a message about acceptance that is "subtle, not saccharine."

== Adaptation ==
Iguana Girl was adapted into a live-action television drama that aired on TV Asahi in 1996. The series was directed by Kazuhisa Imai and written by Yoshikazu Okada, and consisted of 11 episodes broadcast from April 15, 1996, to June 24, 1996. Given the short length of the manga, the adaptation adds a considerable amount of new content to the story, including a suicide attempt by Rika and a love story between Rika and a boy named Noboru, who appears only briefly in the original manga. The series stars Miho Kanno as Rika, Yoshinori Okada as Noboru, and Naomi Kawashima as Yuriko, with "Your Song" by Elton John used as the series' theme music.
