= Hanshin: Half-God =

Japanese manga one-shot

- Cover of the 2015 anthology Half-God, featuring Yucy (left) and Yudy (right)

半神
- Genre: Drama
- Manga
- Written by: Moto Hagio
- Published by: Shogakukan
- English publisher: Fantagraphics
- Magazine: Petit Flower
- English magazine: The Comics Journal
- Published: January 1984

Hanshin: Half-God (Japanese: 半神, Hepburn: Hanshin) (Note: The Japanese word hanshin is typically written using the kanji 半身, which translates literally to 'half side of the body'. The title of the manga uses the kanji 半神, which has the same pronunciation as 半身 but means 'half-god' or 'demigod'.) is a Japanese manga one-shot written and illustrated by Moto Hagio, originally published in the January 1984 issue of the manga magazine Petit Flower. The manga focuses on Yudy and Yucy, identical conjoined twins who are attached at the hip. A theatrical adaptation written by Hagio and playwright Hideki Noda was staged in 1986.

== Plot ==
Yudy and Yucy are identical conjoined twins attached at the hip. Though Yudy is highly intelligent, she has been rendered ugly and emaciated by the parasitical Yucy, a beautiful but mute invalid who relies on Yudy's organs to live. Yudy resents her obligation to care for Yucy, as well as the attention and praise Yucy receives for her beauty. Eventually, Yudy's health deteriorates to the point that she can no longer support her sister; as both twins will die if they remain conjoined, they are surgically separated, and Yucy dies shortly after the procedure.

While Yudy initially celebrates her newfound freedom, she is haunted by the sight of the dying Yucy resembling her own emaciated appearance. Later, a recovered Yudy looks in a mirror to discover that her appearance is now identical to that of Yucy's prior to the separation. She weeps as she reflects on the complicated bond she shares with sister: "a shadow superimposed on myself, my deity".

== Production and release ==
Hanshin was originally published in the January 1984 issue of the manga magazine Petit Flower. An English-language translation of Hanshin was published in the July 2005 issue of The Comics Journal. The translation was also included in A Drunken Dream and Other Stories, a 2010 anthology of manga by Hagio published by Fantagraphics.

== Reception ==
Hanshin is among Hagio's most well-known works. The series' themes of duality and the love-and hate ambivalence between Yudy and Yucy have been alternately interpreted as representing childhood innocence, childhood dependency, gender roles as they related to socially expected femininity, and unconsciousness. Critic Noah Berlatsky praised the manga's thematic depth, writing that while Hanshin may outwardly resemble a "fairly straightforward, even banal feminist parable about casting off gender expectations in order to find your true self," the metaphorical uncertainty suggests that "there isn't any one 'solution' to the story".

The themes of duality and ambivalence in Hanshin recur in Hagio's 1992 one-shot Iguana Girl.

== Adaptations ==
A theatrical adaptation of Hanshin written by Hagio and playwright Hideki Noda was staged in 1986 by Noda's theater troupe Yume no Yuminsha. The play has been revived multiple times, notably in 2018 with a rendition starring Reika Sakurai and Sawako Fujima.
