= Moto Hagio =

Japanese manga artist (born 1949)

- 萩尾望都
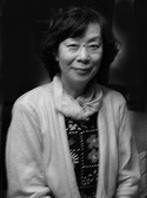
- Hagio in 2008
- Born: May 12, 1949 (age 77); Ōmuta, Fukuoka, Japan
- Occupation: Manga artist
- Years active: 1969–present
- Notable work: The Poe Clan; The Heart of Thomas; They Were Eleven
- Title: Person of Cultural Merit
- Awards: Order of the Rising Sun; Medal of Honor; Japan Cartoonists Association Award; Full list

Signature
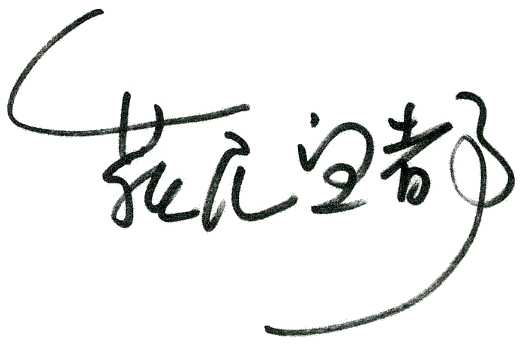

Moto Hagio (萩尾 望都, Hagio Moto; born May 12, 1949) is a Japanese manga artist. Regarded for her contributions to shōjo manga (manga aimed at young and adolescent women), Hagio is considered the most significant artist in the demographic and among the most influential manga artists of all time, being referred to as the "god of shōjo manga" (少女漫画の神様, shōjo manga no kami-sama) by critics.

Hagio made her debut as a manga artist in 1969 at the publishing company Kodansha before moving to Shogakukan in 1971, where she was able to publish her more radical and unconventional works that had been rejected by other publishers. Her first serializations at Shogakukan – the vampire fantasy The Poe Clan, the shōnen-ai (male–male romance) drama The Heart of Thomas, and the science fiction thriller They Were Eleven – were among the first works of shōjo manga to achieve mainstream critical and commercial success. Hagio subsequently emerged as a central figure in the Year 24 Group, a grouping of female manga artists who significantly influenced shōjo manga in the 1970s by introducing new aesthetic styles and expanding the category to incorporate new genres. Since the 1980s, Hagio has drawn primarily adult-oriented manga in the manga magazine Petit Flower and its successor publication Flowers, notably Marginal, A Cruel God Reigns, and Nanohana.

While Hagio primarily authors works in the science fiction, fantasy, and shōnen-ai genres, her manga explores a wide range of themes and subjects, including comedy, historical drama, and social and environmental issues. She has been recognized with numerous awards both in Japan and internationally, including the Order of the Rising Sun, a Medal of Honor, and commendation as a Person of Cultural Merit.

== Biography ==
=== Early life and career ===
Moto Hagio was born on May 12, 1949, in Ōmuta, Fukuoka. The second of four siblings, Hagio's father worked as dockworker, while her mother was a homemaker. Because of her father's job, the Hagio family moved frequently between Omuta and Suita in Osaka Prefecture. Hagio began to draw at an early age in her spare time, and attended private art lessons with her older sister. In her third year of elementary school, she began reading manga that she acquired at kashi-hon (book rental stores) and her school library. Her parents discouraged her interest in illustration and manga, which Hagio states they viewed as "something for children not old enough to read" and "an impediment to studying"; this would be a major contributing factor to what would become a lifelong strained relationship with her parents.

During her childhood, Hagio read and became influenced by the works of manga artists Osamu Tezuka, Shōtarō Ishinomori, Hideko Mizuno, and Masako Watanabe, as well as literary fiction by Japanese authors such as Kenji Miyazawa and western science fiction and fantasy authors such as Isaac Asimov, Arthur C. Clarke, and Robert A. Heinlein. She began to seriously consider a professional career in manga after reading Tezuka's manga series Shinsengumi in 1965, and in 1967 began submitting manga manuscripts to various publishers, including Kodansha, Shueisha, and Tezuka's own manga magazine COM.

In her senior year of high school Hagio met manga artist Makiko Hirata, who also lived in Ōmuta and was pursuing a professional career at Kodansha while still in high school. After graduating, Hirata moved to Tokyo and offered to introduce Hagio to her editor, which Hagio accepted. Hagio made her professional debut as a manga artist in Kodansha's Nakayoshi manga magazine, with the short stories Lulu to Mimi in August 1969 and Suteki na Mahō in September 1969. Hagio began working for Nakayoshi under a new editor, but struggled under the editorial constraints of the magazine: Nakayoshi published primarily sports manga for children, while Hagio preferred to write science fiction and fantasy stories focused on mature themes and subject material. Her next four manuscripts submitted to Nakayoshi were consequently rejected, with her editors instructing her to write stories that were "more interesting and cheerful". In 1970, Hagio published the one-shot (single-chapter) manga stories Cool Cat and Bakuhatsu Gaisha in Nakayoshi.

=== Breakthrough and the Year 24 Group ===
Shortly after her debut, Hagio began pen pal correspondence with Norie Masuyama, a fan of Hagio's who discovered her work through Nakayoshi. Masuyama gifted Hagio a copy of the novel Demian by Hermann Hesse, an author whose novels came to greatly affect Hagio and significantly influenced her manga. Contemporaneously, Hagio's editor assigned her to assist manga artist Keiko Takemiya, whose work had been published in Nakayoshi, COM, and Margaret. The two artists became friends, and Takemiya suggested that they move to an apartment in Tokyo together; Hagio, who was still living with her parents in Ōmuta and unsure of her future as a manga artist, initially refused her invitation. Shortly thereafter, Takemiya introduced Hagio to Junya Yamamoto, an editor at Shogakukan and editor-in-chief of the manga magazine Bessatsu Shōjo Comic. Yamamoto agreed to publish Hagio's previously rejected manuscripts, and Hagio accepted Takemiya's offer to move to Tokyo.

In 1971, Hagio and Takemiya moved to a rented house in Ōizumigakuenchō, Nerima, Tokyo, located near the home of Norie Masuyama. Together, the three women decided to create a living space modeled off of 19th French literary salons, nicknamed the "Ōizumi Salon". The Ōizumi Salon aimed to improve the quality and reputation of shōjo manga, a demographic which at the time was dismissed by critics as publishing frivolous stories for young children. Numerous shōjo artists visited the Ōizumi Salon, including Shio Satō, Yasuko Sakata, Yukiko Kai, Akiko Hatsu, Nanae Sasaya, Mineko Yamada, Aiko Ito, Michi Tarasawa, and Misako Nachi. This grouping of artists would come to be referred to as the Year 24 Group. (Note: The group was so named because its members were born in or around year 24 of the Shōwa era (or 1949 in the Gregorian calendar).) The Year 24 Group contributed significantly to the development of shōjo manga by introducing new aesthetic styles and expanding the demographic to incorporate elements of science fiction, historical fiction, adventure fiction, and same-sex romance: both male–male (shōnen-ai and yaoi) and female–female (yuri). During this period, Hagio published the shōnen-ai one-shot The November Gymnasium in 1971, followed by the vampire fantasy The Poe Clan in 1972, with the latter series becoming Hagio's first major critical and commercial success. The Poe Clan was also the first series that Shogakukan published as a tankōbon (collected edition); the first tankōbon edition of The Poe Clan sold out its initial print run of 30,000 copies in three days, an unprecedented sales volume at the time for a shōjo manga series that had not been adapted into an anime.

Following a 1973 trip to Europe by Hagio, Masuyama, and Yamagishi, Takemiya announced that the Ōizumi Salon would cease, as she preferred to continue her career alone. Decades later, both Hagio and Takemiya would disclose that the pair had a falling out in 1973 that remains unreconciled; Takemiya has written in her memoirs about feelings of jealously and an inferiority complex towards Hagio, while Hagio has written that their relationship was strained by accusations from critics that she plagiarized her shōnen-ai works from Takemiya. Nonetheless, the innovation introduced to shōjo manga by the Year 24 Group significantly contributed to the development of the demographic, bringing it to what critics have described as its "golden age".

=== Career as a manga artist ===
In the wake of the critical and commercial success of The Rose of Versailles by Year 24 Group member Riyoko Ikeda, Hagio's editor Junya Yamamoto asked her to create a series of similar length and complexity for publication in the manga magazine Shūkan Shōjo Comic. The resulting series was The Heart of Thomas, a long-form serialized version of Hagio's earlier The November Gymnasium, which began serialization in the magazine in 1974. Though initially poorly received by readers, by the end of its serialization The Heart of Thomas was among the most popular series in Shūkan Shōjo Comic. The critical and commercial success of both The Poe Clan and The Heart of Thomas freed Hagio from most editorial constraints and allowed her to publish her previously rejected works of science fiction, a genre which at the time was perceived as inappropriate for female audiences and thus was effectively non-existent in shōjo manga.

They Were Eleven, Hagio's first published science fiction manga series, began serialization in Bessatsu Shōjo Comic in 1975. Hagio began to establish herself as a science fiction writer and moved away from the constraints of shōjo magazines, publishing a manga adaptation of science fiction writer Ryu Mitsuse's novel Hyakuoku no Hiru to Sen'oku no Yoru in the shōnen manga (boys' manga) magazine Weekly Shōnen Champion in 1977. This was followed by several manga adaptations of the works of Ray Bradbury published as the one-shot anthology U wa Uchuusen no U beginning in 1977, Gin no Sankaku in 1980, and various one-shots in the science-fiction focused S-F Magazine. Hagio did create science fiction works for shōjo magazines during this period, notably Star Red for Shūkan Shōjo Comic from 1978 to 1979.

In 1980 Yamamoto became the founding editor of Petit Flower, a new magazine at Shogakukan that published manga aimed at an adult female audience. Hagio moved to the magazine, where she was given full editorial control over the manga she produced. In the subsequent decades Hagio would publish many works in Petit Flower and its successor publication Flowers that are distinguished by their mature themes and subject material. Notable works include the crime thriller Mesh in 1980, the post-apocalyptic science fiction series Marginal from 1985 to 1987, the semi-autobiographical Iguana Girl in 1992, and A Cruel God Reigns from 1993 to 2001. Hagio's works during this period were generally not influenced by developments in contemporary shōjo manga, such as the erotic manga of artists like Kyoko Okazaki and the josei manga or artists like Erica Sakurazawa.

Hagio began teaching manga studies as a visiting professor at the Joshibi University of Art and Design in 2011. That same year, the Fukushima nuclear disaster occurred; with the publication of her manga series Nanohana, Hagio became one of the first manga artists following Kotobuki Shiriagari to address the disaster directly in her work; Hagio's prominence as an artist is credited with influencing other manga artists to address the disaster in their works. To mark the fifteenth anniversary of Flowers in 2016, Hagio launched a revival of The Poe Clan in the magazine, publishing new chapters nearly forty years after the conclusion of the original series.

== Style and influences ==
A page from Hagio's The Poe Clan (1972–1976), exhibiting the artist's characteristic use of symbolic decorative motifs, superimposed close-ups of characters, and mise-en-scène distinguished by a strong contrast of shadow and light

When asked about her visual influences, Hagio responded that she was influenced by Shotaro Ishinomori's page layouts, Hideko Mizuno's clothing, and Masako Yashiro's eyes.

In the early 1970s, Hagio and her fellow Year 24 Group members contributed significantly to the establishment of shōjo manga as a distinct category of manga, iterating on contributions made to the category in the 1950s and 1960s by artists such as Macoto Takahashi to establish a "visual grammar of shōjo manga". Chief among these developments was the use of interior monologue, which was written outside of speech balloons and scattered across the page. These monologues allow the exploration of the characters' interiority and emotions, and serve to compensate for the absence of third-person narration in manga.

In Hagio's manga specifically, interior monologues are often accompanied by symbolic motifs that extend beyond panel borders and overlap in a manner resembling a montage or a collage, creating a three-dimensional effect. These motifs are often composed of decorative elements (flowers, clouds, screentones, etc.) but are also often lines, sparkles, and onomatopoeia which serve to reinforce the "exploration of the interiority" of the characters. Hagio also makes use of full-body portraits of main characters, a technique originated Macoto Takahashi, as well as superimposed close-ups of these characters, to mark the character as important in the narrative. Hagio also uses mise-en-scène and lighting marked a strong contrast of shadow and light, giving a theatrical effect to her works.

When Hagio began to create manga for an adult audience beginning with Mesh in 1980, she adopted a more realist style. In particular, she changed the body shape of her characters, who until then exhibited the typical shōjo style of heads that were proportionally larger than the rest of their bodies. She also gradually altered her page layouts, especially during the 2000s, to make her style more accessible to a new readership.

== Themes and motifs ==
Hagio primarily authors works in the science fiction, fantasy, and boys' love genres, though her works explore a wide variety of themes and subjects. This is especially true of her short stories, which have depicted a variety of topics and genres including comedy, historical drama, and social and environmental issues. Though her works are primarily aimed at a female audience, she does also attract a male readership.

=== Dysfunctional families ===
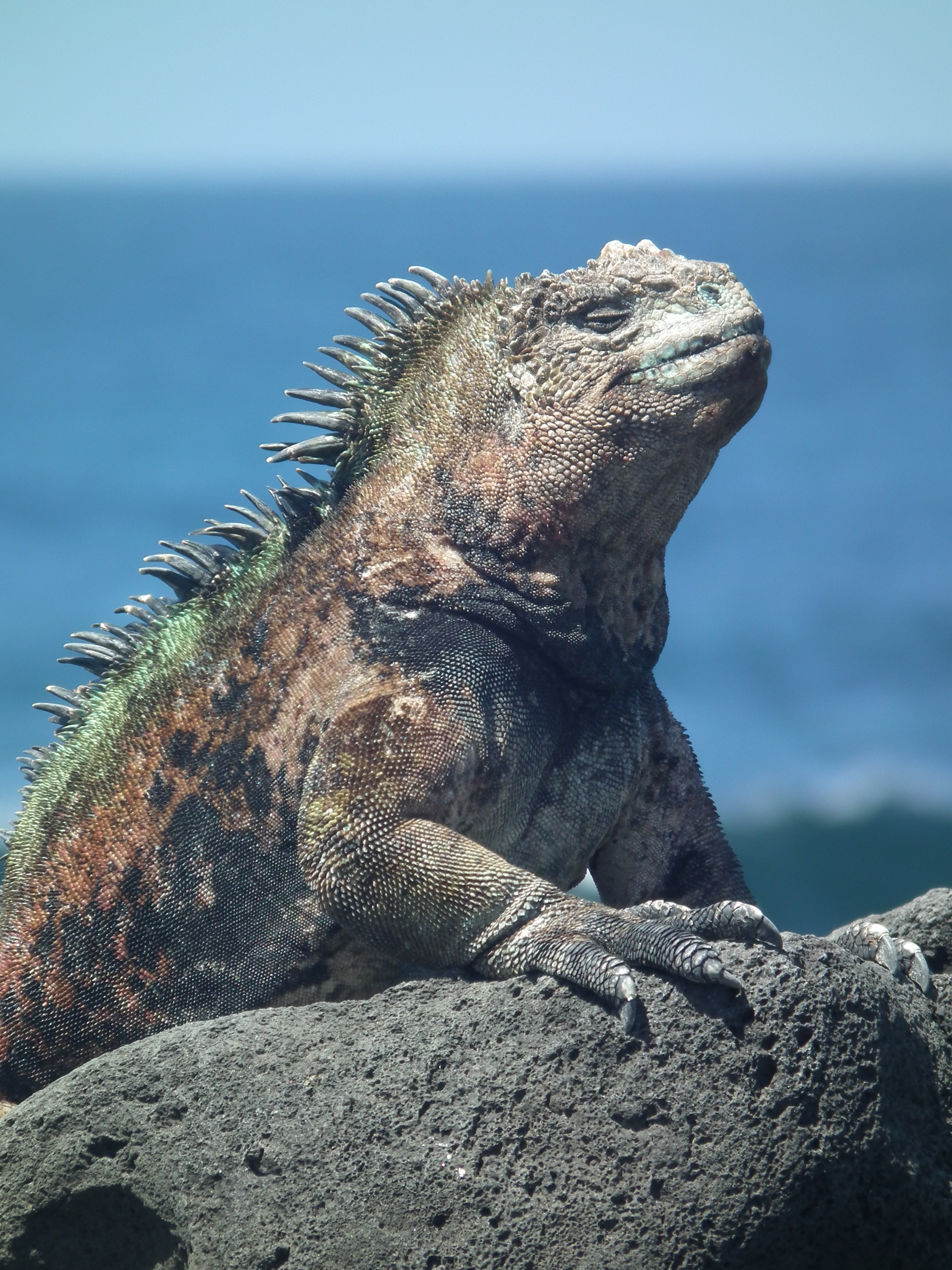
A documentary about marine iguanas (pictured) inspired Hagio to write Iguana Girl (1992), a semi-autobiographical manga about her relationship with her mother.

Hagio has long had a difficult relationship with her parents, who disapproved of her career as a manga artist even after she achieved mainstream critical and commercial success; it was not until 2010, when Hagio was 61 years old, that her mother accepted her profession. This strained relationship, combined with Hagio's own interest in family psychology, has had a significant impact on her manga. Families and familial drama recur as common motifs in Hagio's manga, especially twins, which are inspired by Hagio's childhood fantasy of having a twin sister so that her mother would pay more attention to her, and mothers, who are typically portrayed as incapable of loving their children and frequently die.

Initially, Hagio approached manga as an opportunity to depict "something beautiful", rather than an "ugly" reality. Consequently, she avoided contemporary Japanese settings for her early works, instead preferring European or otherworldly sci-fi settings. These early works nevertheless address dysfunctional family relationships, such as her one-shot Bianca (1970), a "gothic revenge plot" by a child against their parents and older authority figures. Her 1992 one-shot Iguana Girl became a turning point in both her life and career. In this semi-autobiographical story, a mother perceives her daughter as an iguana and rejects her; the daughter internalizes this rejection, and is in turn convinced that she is an iguana. Hagio has described the process of writing the story as a means of making peace with her family, and following its publication, she became more comfortable writing works set in contemporary Japan. Familial drama nevertheless remains a common theme in her works, as expressed in stories that address topics of child abandonment, incestual rape, and abortion.

=== Bishōnen and shōnen-ai ===
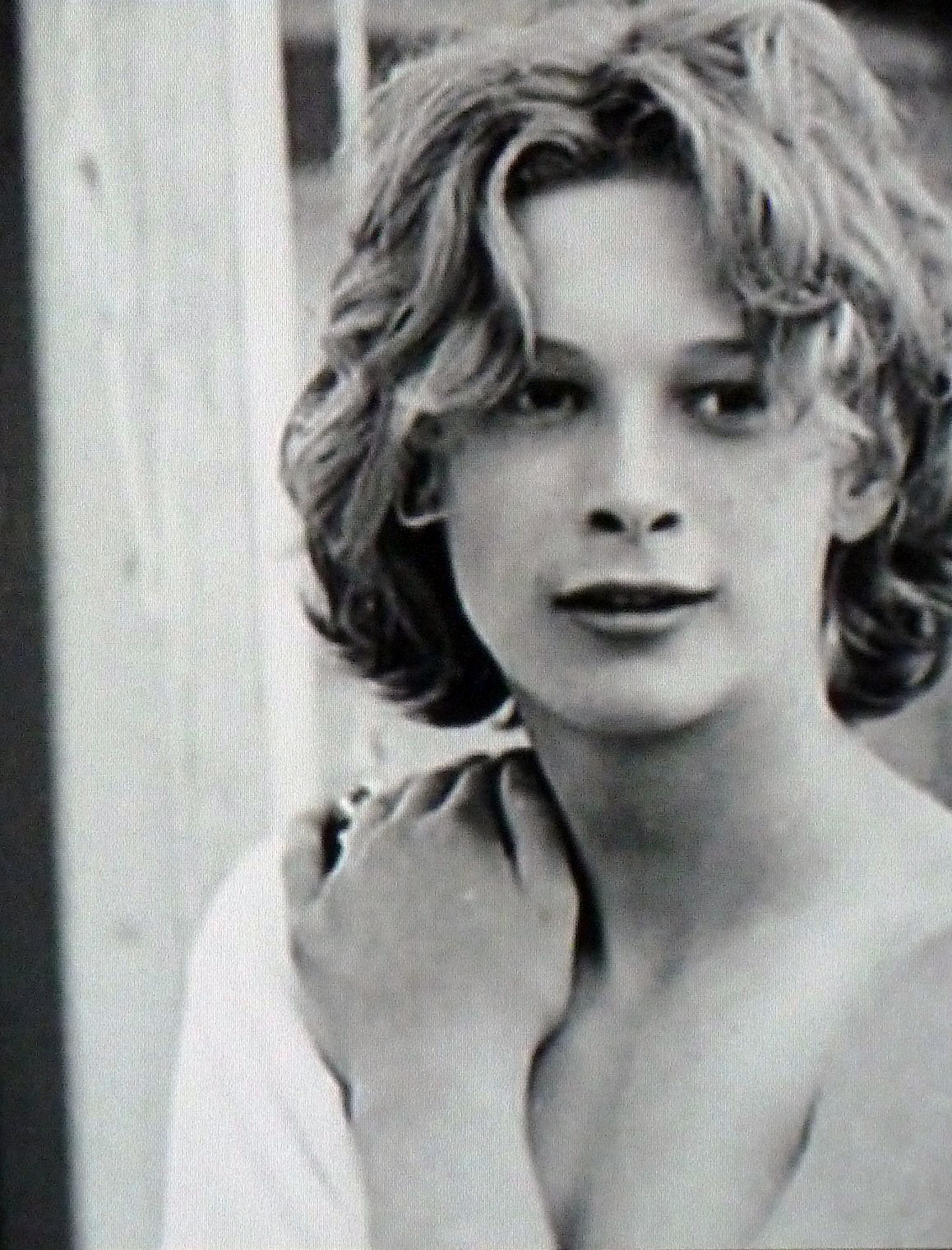
Hagio's bishōnen are inspired in part by films featuring young men in homoerotic scenarios, such as Death in Venice (star Björn Andrésen pictured).

Hagio's works typically feature male rather than female protagonists, especially bishōnen (lit. "beautiful boys", a term for handsome and androgynous young men). She has described a "sense of liberation" that comes from writing male characters, as they allow her to express thoughts and concepts freely, in contrast to female protagonists who face the restrictions of a patriarchal society. Hagio first introduced bishōnen protagonists to her works with The November Gymnasium in 1971. The series is set in an all-boys boarding school, though an early draft of the story had a girls boarding school as its setting in order to conform to the conventions of the shōjo manga of the time, resulting in a story of the Class S genre. Dissatisfied with the draft, Hagio changed the protagonists to bishōnen; this aligned the story with the then-nascent genre of shōnen-ai, the precursor to modern boys' love (male–male romance manga).

The bishōnen of Hagio's works are both non-sexual and androgynous: socially masculine, physically androgynous, and psychologically feminine. The meaning of gender ambiguity has been variously considered by critics: from a queer perspective by manga scholar James Welker as an expression of sublimated lesbian identity, and from a feminist perspective by sociologist Chizuko Ueno it as an attempt to break out of the patriarchal dichotomy by creating a "third sex".

=== Feminist science fiction ===
Hagio's science fiction works depict themes and subjects typical of the genre, such as human cloning and time travel, but also take advantage of the genre's ability to depict worlds in which gender-based differences and power imbalances differ from that of the real word. Hagio's science fiction manga frequently explores topics relating to the place women in society, motherhood, and gender fluidity, taking particular inspiration from the works of Ursula K. Le Guin.

Notable examples include They Were Eleven, which depicts characters who belong to a race where individuals are asexual at birth and whose sex is determined at adulthood; Star Red, which depicts a protagonist who is birthed by a male character, and Marginal, which is set in a society that has become majority male through the use of sexual biological engineering. This feminist science fiction, where characters that blur distinctions of sex and gender, challenges notions of dualism and sexual dimorphism and has been argued by sociologist Chizuko Ueno as representing an evolution of the feminist use of the boys' love genre to explore these themes. It has also inspired the works of other shōjo science fiction manga artists, such as Reiko Shimizu and Saki Hiwatari.

== Works ==
=== Manga ===
The following is a list of Hagio's serialized and one-shot manga works. Serializations refer to multi-chapter works that are typically later published as collected editions (tankōbon), while one-shots refer to single-chapter works that are sometimes later collected in anthologies. Titles for works that have not received an official English-language translation or do not have an English title are listed using Hepburn romanization. All dates and publishers are sourced from The 50th Anniversary of The Poe Clan and the World of Moto Hagio unless otherwise noted.

==== Serials ====
Start	End	English/Hepburn title	Original title	Publisher
1971	1974	Seirei Kari	精霊狩り ('Spirit Hunting')	Shogakukan
1972	present (Note: Originally serialized from 1972 to 1976, revived from 2016 to present.)	The Poe Clan	ポーの一族	Shogakukan
1972	1976	Totemo Shiawase Moto-chan	とってもしあわせモトちゃん ('Very Happy Moto-chan')	Shogakukan
1974	1974	The Heart of Thomas	トーマの心臓	Shogakukan
1975	1975	Kono ko Urimasu!	この娘うります！ ('I'll Sell You This Girl!')	Shogakukan
1975	1975	Aroisu	アロイス ('Alois')	Hakusensha
1975	1975	They Were Eleven	11人いる！	Shogakukan
1975	1976	Akagge no Itoko	赤ッ毛のいとこ ('Red Haired Cousin')	Shueisha
1976	1976	American Pie	アメリカン・パイ	Akita Shoten
1976	1976	Europe Migihidari	ヨーロッパみぎひだり ('Europe Right and Left')	Akita Shoten
1977	1977	Shoujo Roman	少女ろまん (Shōjo Roman)	Akita Shoten
1977	1978	Bradbury Kessaku-sen Gensaku	Bradbury傑作選 原作 ('Bradbury Masterpiece Original Selection')	Shueisha
1977	1978	Ten Billion Days and One Hundred Billion Nights	百億の昼と千億の夜	Shogakukan
1978	1979	Star Red	スター・レッド	Shogakukan
1979	1979	Les Enfants Terribles	恐るべき子どもたち	Shogakukan
1980	1983	Mesh	メッシュ	Shogakukan
1980	1982	Gin no Sankaku	銀の三角 ('Silver Triangle')	Hayakawa
1981	1984	A, A Prime	A-A'	Akita Shoten, Shogakukan
1982	1982	Mozaiku Rasen	モザイク・ラセン ('Mosaic Rasen')	Akita Shoten
1985	1985	Bara no Kabin	ばらの花びん ('Vase of Roses')	Shogakukan
1985	1987	Marginal	マージナル	Shogakukan
1988	1988	Kanzen Hanzai Fearī	完全犯罪 フェアリー ('Perfect Crime Fairy')	Shogakukan
1988	1989	Furawā Fesutibaru	フラワーフェスティバル ('Flower Festival')	Shogakukan
1988	1991	Umi no Aria	海のアリア ('Aria of the Sea')	Kadokawa Shoten
1980	1990	Rōma e no Michi	ローマへの道 ('Road to Rome')	Shogakukan
1991	1992	Kanshashira Zunootoko	感謝知らずの男 ('Thankless Man')	Shogakukan
1992	2001	A Cruel God Reigns	残酷な神が支配する	Shogakukan
1992	1994	Abunai Oka no Ie	あぶない丘の家 ('The House on the Dangerous Hill')	Kadokawa Shoten
2002	2005	Otherworld Barbara	バルバラ異界	Shogakukan
2006	2007	Abunazaka Hotel	あぶな坂HOTEL	Shueisha
2006	2012	Anywhere but Here	ここではない★どこか	Shogakukan
2008	2012	Lil' Leo	レオくん	Shogakukan
2009	2010	Hishikawa-san to Neko	菱川さんと猫 ('Mr. Hishikawa and His Cat')	Kodansha
2011	2012	Nanohana	なのはな	Shogakukan
2013	2020	Queen Margot	王妃マルゴ	Shueisha
2013	2015	Away	アウェイ	Shogakukan

==== One-shots ====
Year	English/Hepburn title	Japanese title	Published in
1969	Lulu to Mimi	ルルとミミ ('Lulu and Mimi')	Nakayoshi
1969	Suteki na Mahō	すてきな魔法 ('Wonderful Magic')	Nakayoshi
1970	Kūru Kyatto	クールキャット ('Cool Cat')	Nakayoshi
1970	Bakuhatsu Gaisha	爆発会社 ('Dummy Company')	Nakayoshi
1970	Bianca	ビアンカ (Bianka)	Shōjo Friend
1970	Kēki Kēki Kēki	ケーキケーキケーキ ('Cake Cake Cake')	Nakayoshi
1971	Girl on Porch with Puppy	ポーチで少女が小犬と (Pōchi de Shōjo ga Koinu to)	COM
1971	Belle to Mike no Ohanashi	ベルとマイクのお話し ('The Story of Belle and Mike')	Shōjo Comic
1971	Yuki no Ko	雪の子 ('Snow Child')	Shōjo Comic
1971	Tō no Aru Ie	塔のある家 ('House with a Tower')	Shōjo Comic
1971	Jenifer no Koi no Oaite Wa	ジェニファの恋のお相手は ('Who Is Jennifer's Boyfriend?')	Nakayoshi
1971	Hanayome o Hirotta Otoko	花嫁をひろった男 ('The Man Who Fetched the Bride')	Shōjo Comic
1971	Katappo no Furu Gutsu	かたっぽのふるぐつ ('Worn Out Shoes')	Nakayoshi
1971	Kawaisō na Mama	かわいそうなママ ('Poor Mama')	Shōjo Comic
1971	Seirei-gari	精霊狩り ('Spirit Hunting')	Shōjo Comic
1971	Mōdorin	モードリン ('Maudlin')	Shōjo Comic
1971	Sayo no nū Yukata	小夜の縫うゆかた ('Yukata Sewn by Sayo')	Shōjo Comic
1971	Kenneth Ojisan to Futago	ケネスおじさんとふたご ('Uncle Kenneth and the Twins')	Shōjo Comic
1971	Mō Hitotsu no Koi	もうひとつの恋 ('Another Love')	Shōjo Comic
1971	Jū-gatsu no Shōjo-tachi	10月の少女たち ('Girls in October')	COM
1971	Autumn Journey	秋の旅 (Aki no Tabi)	Shōjo Comic
1971	The November Gymnasium	11月のギムナジウム (Jūichigatsu no Gimunajiumu)	Shōjo Comic
1971	Shiroki Mori Shiroi Shōnen no Fue	白き森白い少年の笛 ('White Forest White Boy Flute')	Shōjo Comic
1971	Shiroi Tori ni Natta Shōjo	白い鳥になった少女 ('The Girl Who Became a White Bird')	Shōjo Comic
1971	Sara-hill no Seiya	セーラ・ヒルの聖夜 ('Sacred Night on Sailor Hill')	Shōjo Comic
1972	Asobi-dama	あそび玉 ('Toy Ball')	Shōjo Comic
1972	Keito-dama ni Jarenaide	毛糸玉にじゃれないで ('Don't Play with the Ball of Yarn')	Shōjo Comic
1972	Mitsukuni no Musume	みつくにの娘 ('Mitsukuni's Daughter')	Shōjo Comic
1972	Gomen Asobase!	ごめんあそばせ! ('I'm Sorry!')	Shōjo Comic
1972	San-gatsu Usagi ga Shūdan De	3月ウサギが集団で ('March Hares in a Group')	Shōjo Comic
1972	Yōsei no Komori	妖精の子もり ('Fairy Slipper')	Shōjo Comic
1972	Roku-gatsu no Koe	6月の声り ('Voice of June')	Shōjo Comic
1972	Mamarēdo-chan	ママレードちゃん ('Marmalade-chan')	Shōjo Comic
1972	Mia	ミーア	Shōjo Comic
1973	Senbon-me no Pin	千本めのピン ('The Thousandth Pin')	Shōjo Comic
1973	Kyabetsu-batake no Isan Sōzokunin	キャベツ畑の遺産相続人 ('Heir to the Cabbage Field')	Shōjo Comic
1973	Ō mai Keseira Sera	オーマイ ケセィラ セラ ('Oh My, Que Sera, Sera')	Shōjo Comic
1974	Hawādo-san no Shinbun Kōkoku	ハワードさんの新聞広告 ('Howard's Newspaper Advertisement')	Shōjo Comic
1974	Unicorn no Yume	ユニコーンの夢 ('Unicorn's Dream')	Shōjo Comic
1974	Manga ABC	まんがABC	Shōjo Comic
1974	Pushikyatto Pushikyatto	プシキャット・プシキャット ('Pussycat Pussycat')	Shōjo Comic
1975	Onshitsu	温室 ('Greenhouse')	Seventeen
1975	Supēsu Sutorīto	スペース ストリート ('Space Street')	Shōjo Comic
1975	Violita	ヴィオリータ	Jotomo
1976	Hana to Hikari no Naka	花と光の中 ('In Flowers and Light')	Shōjo Comic
1976	By the Lake	湖畔にて	Strawberry Fields
1977	Onshitsu	影のない森 ('Shadowless Forest')	Big Comic Original
1977	Marié, Ten Years Later	十年目の毬絵	Big Comic Original
1977	Marine	マリーン	Seventeen
1978	Gōruden Rairakku	ゴールデン ライラック ('Golden Lilac')	Shōjo Comic
1978	Hidarikiki no Izan	左ききのイザン ('Left-Handed Izan')	SF Fantasia
1979	Hanabana ni Sumu Kodomo	花々に住む子供 ('Children Living in Flowers')	Princess
1979	Chrysalis	さなぎ	Seven Comic
1980	Gesshoku	月蝕 ('Lunar Eclipse')	Vampirella
1980	Rāginī	ラーギニー	S-F Magazine
1980	The Visitor	訪問者	Petit Flower
1980	A Drunken Dream	酔夢	Kingin Sagan
1980	Kin'yō no Yoru no Shūkai	金曜の夜の集会 ('Friday Night Gathering')	S-F Magazine
1983	Shiro	城 ('Castle')	Petit Flower
1983	4/4 (Quatre-Quarts)	4/4カトルカース	Petit Flower
1984	Hanshin: Half-God	半神	Petit Flower
1984	Egg Stand	エッグ・スタンド	Petit Flower
1984	Nise ō	偽王 ('False King')	Petit Flower
1984	Herbal Beauty	ハーバル・ビューティ	Bouquet
1984	Tenshi no Gitai	天使の擬態 ('Angel Mimic')	Petit Flower
1984	Fune	船	Petit Flower
1985	Slow Down	スロー・ダウン	Petit Flower
1985	Bara no Kabin	ばらの花びん ('Ship')	Petit Flower
1985	Yūjin K	友人K	Grapefruit
1985	Kimi wa Utsukushii Hitomi	きみは美しい瞳 ('You Have Beautiful Eyes')	Asuka
1989	Kaizoku to Himegimi	海賊と姫君 ('Pirates and Princesses')	Petit Flower
1989	Aoi Tori	青い鳥 ('Bluebird')	Petit Flower
1990	Manatsu no yo no Wakusei (Planet)	真夏のの惑星（プラネット ('Planet of Midsummer')	Petit Flower
1991	Rotbarth	ロットバルト	Petit Flower
1991	Juliette no Koibito	ジュリエットの恋人 ('Juliette's Lover')	Petit Flower
1991	Catharsis	カタルシス	Petit Flower
1992	Iguana Girl	イグアナの娘	Petit Flower
1994	Gogo no Hizashi	午後の日射し ('Afternoon Sunshine')	Big Gold
1994	Gakkō e Iku Kusuri	学校へ行くクスリ	Big Gold
1998	The Child Who Comes Home	帰ってくる子	Child Igyō Collection 7
2006	Nagagutsu o Haita Shima Neko	長靴をはいたシマ猫 ('Puss in Boots')	Neko Moto
2007	Birthday Cake	バースディ・ケーキ	SF Japan
2007	The Willow Tree	柳の木	Flowers
2008	Nekomoto Clinic	猫本クリニック	Neko Moto 2
2016	Through Yura's Gate	由良の門を	Monthly Afternoon
2018	Basutei Nite	バス停にて ('At the Bus Stop')	Morning
2020	Galileo no Uchū	ガリレオの宇宙 ('Galileo's Universe')	App Store
2021	Kirin Kari	麒麟狩り ('Kirin Hunting')	Daijiro Morohoshi 50th Anniversary Tribute

==== English-translated works ====
- Four Shōjo Stories (1996, Viz Media, ISBN 1-56931-055-6)
  - Multi-author anthology containing They Were Eleven.
- A, A Prime (1997, Viz Media, ISBN 978-1569312384)
  - Collects A, A', 4/4, and X+Y.
- A Drunken Dream and Other Stories (2010, Fantagraphics Books, ISBN 978-1-60699-377-4)
  - Collects Bianca; Girl on Porch with Puppy; Autumn Journey; Marié, Ten Years Later; A Drunken Dream; Hanshin: Half-God; Angel Mimic; Iguana Girl; The Child Who Comes Home; and The Willow Tree.
- The Heart of Thomas (2013, Fantagraphics Books, ISBN 978-1606995518)
- Otherworld Barbara (Fantagraphics Books), published as:
  - Otherworld Barbara Volume 1 (2016, ISBN 978-1606999431)
  - Otherworld Barbara Volume 2 (2017, ISBN 978-1683960232)
- Neo Parasyte m (2017, Kodansha Comics, ISBN 978-1632366047)
  - Multi-author anthology containing Through Yura's Gate.
- The Poe Clan (Fantagraphics Books), published as:
  - The Poe Clan Volume 1 (2019, ISBN 978-1683962083)
  - The Poe Clan Volume 2 (2022, ISBN 978-1683965725)
- Lil' Leo (2021, Denpa, ISBN 978-1634429788)
- They Were Eleven (2024, Denpa, ISBN 978-1634428156)

=== Essays & memoirs ===
- Omoide o Kirinuku Toki (思い出を切りぬくとき; "When You Cut Through the Memories"). 1998, Anzudo, ISBN 978-4872822311
- Yumemiru Bīzu Monogatari (夢見るビーズ物語; "Dreaming Beads Story"). 2009, Poplar Publishing, ISBN 978-4591114650
- Isshun To Eien To (一瞬と永遠と; "For a Moment and Eternity"). 2011, Gengi Shobo, ISBN 978-4901998758
- Watashi no Shōjo Manga Kōgi (私の少女マンガ講義; "My Lecture on Shōjo Manga"). 2018, Shinchosha, ISBN 978-4103996026
- Ichido Kiri no Ōizumi no Hanashi (一度きりの大泉の話; "A One-Time Story About Ōizumi"). 2021, Kawade Shobō Shinsha, ISBN 978-4309029627

=== Other ===
- Toki no Tabibito: Time Stranger, character designer (1986, animated film)
- Illusion of Gaia, character designer (1993, video game)

== Reception ==
=== Influence ===
Hagio is regarded by critics as the most influential shōjo manga artist of all time and among the most influential manga artists in the entirety of the medium, and is referred to as the "god of shōjo manga" (少女漫画の神様, shōjo manga no kami-sama) by the Japanese press and critics, as styled off of Osamu Tezuka's sobriquet "the god of manga". She, along with the other artists associated with the Year 24 Group, is credited with "revolutionizing" shōjo manga and bringing it into its "golden age", making shōjo manga central to manga production in the 1980s and attracting a male readership to the category for the first time. Hagio and Keiko Takemiya originated the shōnen-ai genre, which was developed throughout the 1980s and 1990s to become yaoi, a major genre of manga. She is further credited with establishing science fiction as a subgenre of shōjo manga, though Hagio's impact on science fiction extends beyond manga to literature through her illustrations of science fiction and fantasy novels, with science fiction novelists such as Azusa Noa and Baku Yumemakura citing Hagio as among their influences.

=== Awards and nominations ===
Award	Year	Category	Recipient(s)	Result	Ref.
Asahi Prize	2016	Asahi Prize	—	Won	
Angoulême International Comics Festival Awards	2024	Fauve d'honneur	—	Won	
Eisner Award	2011	Best U.S. Edition of International Material—Asia	A Drunken Dream and Other Stories	Nominated	
Eisner Award	2014	Best U.S. Edition of International Material—Asia	The Heart of Thomas	Nominated	
Eisner Award	2018	Best U.S. Edition of International Material—Asia	Otherworld Barbara	Nominated	
Eisner Award	2020	Best U.S. Edition of International Material—Asia	The Poe Clan	Nominated	
Eisner Award	2022	Will Eisner Award Hall of Fame	—	Won	
Harvey Awards	2020	Best Manga	The Poe Clan	Nominated	
Inkpot Award	2010	Inkpot Award	—	Won	
Iwate Manga Awards	2018	Special Award	Nanohana	Won	
Japan Cartoonists Association Award	2011	Minister of Education, Science and Technology Award	—	Won	
Medal of Honor	2012	Purple Ribbon	—	Won	
Nihon SF Taisho Award	2006	Grand Prize	Otherworld Barbara	Won	
Order of the Rising Sun	2022	3rd Class, Gold Rays with Neck Ribbon	—	Won	
Person of Cultural Merit	2019	Person of Cultural Merit	—	Won	
Seiun Award	1980	Best Comic	Star Red	Won	
Seiun Award	1983	Best Comic	Gin no Sankaku	Won	
Seiun Award	1985	Best Comic	X + Y	Won	
Sense of Gender Award	2012	Lifetime Achievement Award	Nanohana	Won	
Shogakukan Manga Award	1975	Shōnen (Boys' Manga)	They Were Eleven and The Poe Clan	Won	
Tezuka Osamu Cultural Prize	1997	Award for Excellence	A Cruel God Reigns	Won	
