= Machi de Uwasa no Tengu no Ko =

Japanese manga series

町でうわさの天狗の子
- Manga
- Written by: Nao Iwamoto
- Published by: Shogakukan
- Magazine: Flowers
- Original run: 21 December 2007 – 10 January 2014
- Volumes: 12

Machi de Uwasa no Tengu no Ko (町でうわさの天狗の子; "Tengu Child of Town Rumors") is a Japanese manga series written and illustrated by Nao Iwamoto. It was published by Shogakukan in Flowers. The first volume was published on 21 December 2007, with the final published on 10 January 2014.

== Characters ==
- Akihime
- Shun
- Takeru

== Reception ==
It won the 55th Shogakukan Manga Award for shōjo manga, and was nominated for the 18th Tezuka Osamu Cultural Prize.

Volume 6 reached the 30th place on the weekly Japanese manga chart and, as of 11 April 2010, has sold 20,479 copies. Volume 8 reached the 29th place and, as of 12 June 2011, has sold 23,916 copies. Volume 9 reached the 17th place and, as of 14 April 2012, has sold 33,931 copies. Volume 10 reached the 24th place and, as of 16 December 2012, has sold 38,371 copies. Volume 11 reached the 31st place and, as of 13 July 2013, has sold 33,179 copies. Volume 12 reached the 48th place and, as of 12 January 2014, has sold 18,568 copies.
