= Gold Kingdom and Water Kingdom =

Japanese manga series

- Volume cover

金の国 水の国 (Kin no Kuni Mizu no Kuni)
- Genre: Romantic fantasy
- Manga
- Written by: Nao Iwamoto
- Published by: Shogakukan
- English publisher: NA: Seven Seas Entertainment
- Imprint: Flower Comics Special
- Magazine: Flowers
- Original run: October 28, 2014 – April 28, 2016
- Volumes: 1
- Anime film
- Directed by: Kotono Watanabe
- Produced by: Toshimi Tanio
- Written by: Fumi Tsubota
- Music by: Evan Call
- Studio: Madhouse
- Released: January 27, 2023
- Runtime: 117 minutes
- icon

Gold Kingdom and Water Kingdom (Japanese: 金の国 水の国, Hepburn: Kin no Kuni Mizu no Kuni; lit. 'Land of Gold, Land of Water') is a Japanese manga series written and illustrated by Nao Iwamoto. It was serialized in Shogakukan's Flowers magazine from October 2014 to April 2016, with its chapters collected into a single tankōbon volume. It tells the story of Princess Saara and Prince Naranbayar, who, in a bid to maintain peace between their rival kingdoms, enter into a pretend marriage and unexpectedly begin to fall in love.

An anime film adaptation produced by Madhouse premiered in Japan in January 2023.

== Characters ==
Naranbayar (ナランバヤル, Naranbayaru)
Voiced by: Kento Kaku
Sara (サーラ, Sāra)
Voiced by: Minami Hamabe
Saladin (サラディーン, Saradīn)
Voiced by: Hiroshi Kamiya
Lailala (ライララ, Rairara)
Voiced by: Miyuki Sawashiro
Jauhara (ジャウハラ)
Voiced by: Subaru Kimura
Leopoldine (レオポルディーネ, Reoporudīne)
Voiced by: Keiko Toda
Piripappa (ピリパッパ)
Voiced by: Chafurin
Oduni (オドゥニ)
Voiced by: Masaki Terasoma
Rastavan III (ラスタバン3世, Rasutaban Sansei)
Voiced by: Banjō Ginga

== Media ==
=== Manga ===
Written and illustrated by Nao Iwamoto, Gold Kingdom and Water Kingdom was serialized in Shogakukan's josei manga magazine Flowers from October 28, 2014, to April 28, 2016. The series was collected into a single tankōbon volume, published by Shogakukan on July 8, 2016.

In March 2023, Seven Seas Entertainment announced that it licensed the series for English publication. The volume was released on November 28 of the same year.

No.	Original release date	Original ISBN	English release date	English ISBN
1	July 8, 2016	978-4-09-138668-7	November 28, 2023	979-8-88843-307-2
1. "Two Kingdoms in a Faraway Land" (どこかにある二つの国, Doko ka ni Aru Futatsu no Kuni); 2. "Gold Kingdom" (金の国, Kin no Kuni); 3. "The Brightest Husband" (賢い夫, Kashikoi Otto); 4. "Water and Love" (水と愛, Mizu to Ai); 5. "To the Water Kingdom" (水の国へ, Mizu no Kuni e); 6. "All I Want" (たったそれだけのこと, Tatta Sore dake no Koto); 7. "The Promise" (約束, Yakusoku); 8. "Gold Kingdom, Water Kingdom" (金の国と水の国, Kin no Kuni to Mizu no Kuni)

=== Film ===
An anime film adaptation was announced on June 23, 2022. It is produced by Madhouse and directed by Kotono Watanabe, with Fumi Tsubota writing the scripts and Evan Call composing the music. The film had its world premiere at the Animation Is Film Festival in Los Angeles on October 21, 2022. It was later released in Japanese theaters by Warner Bros. Japan on January 27, 2023. Kotone performed the film's theme song "Brand New World".

== Reception ==
In 2016, Gold Kingdom and Water Kingdom ranked 33rd in Da Vinci magazine's "Book of the Year" list, and it ranked third in "The Best Manga 2017 Kono Manga o Yome!" list of Freestyle magazine. In 2017, the series topped Takarajimasha's Kono Manga ga Sugoi! list of best manga for female readers. In the same year, the series was nominated for the 10th Manga Taishō, and ranked second out of 13 nominees.

== See also ==
- The Seven Knights of the Marronnier Kingdom, another manga series by the same author
