= Tono (artist) =

Japanese manga artist

Tono is a Japanese manga artist. Born in Hiroshima Prefecture, Japan, she is the eldest of three children, and her younger sister is manga artist Mitsuru Uguisu, with whom she has a dōjinshi circle called "Uguisu Shimai" (うぐいす姉妹, lit. 'Nightingale Sisters'). Tono made her debut in 1983 with Shima Shima Everyday (しましまえぶりでぃ, Shima Shima Eburidei) in Puff, published by Zassōsha. In 2007, Chikita Gugu won the 7th Sense of Gender Award Special Award from The Japanese Association for Gender Fantasy & Science Fiction.

== Works ==
- Shima Shima Everyday (4 volumes, 1983, Asahi Sonorama)
- Karubania Monogatari (カルバニア物語) (12 volumes, 1993-current, Tokuma Shoten)
- Naba Naba Paradise Indōiin Banjōki (ナバナバパラダイス犬童医院繁盛記) (3 volumes, 1995–1998, Asahi Sonorama)
- Chikita GuGu (チキタ★GuGu) (8 volumes, 1997–2007, Asahi Sonorama)
- Yokaranu Hanashi (よからぬ話) (2 volumes, 1997, Asahi Sonorama)
- Dusk Story (ダスクストーリィ, Dasuku Sutōri) (2 volumes, 1999–2000, Shueisha)
- Keshikaranu Hanashi (けしからぬ話) (1 volume, 1999, Asahi Sonorama)
- Rabbit Hunting (ラビット・ハンティング, Rabitto Hantingu) (2 volumes, 2003–2007, Shinshokan)
- Hakase no Sakana-tachi / Kaori-san no Kikyō (博士の魚たち/薫さんの帰郷) (1 volume, 2004, Asahi Sonorama)
- Karen no Fasunā (カレンのファスナー) (1 volume, 2004, Hakusensha)
- Kiiroi Kaigan (黄色い海岸) (1 volume, 2004, Asahi Sonorama)
- Oretachi no Sōshiki Hon (おれたちの葬式本) (1 volume, 2004, Asahi Sonorama))
- Suna no Shita no Yume (砂の下の夢) (2 volumes, 2004–2006, Akita Shoten)
- Tono-chan no Shima Shima Everyday (TONOちゃんのしましまえぶりでぃ, Tono-chan no Shima Shima Eburidei) (1 volume, 2005, Asahi Sonorama)
