= Sūji de Asobo =

Japanese manga series

- First tankōbon volume cover

数字であそぼ。
- Genre: Comedy; Coming-of-age
- Manga
- Written by: Murako Kinuta
- Published by: Shogakukan
- Imprint: Flowers Comics α
- Magazine: Monthly Flowers
- Original run: June 28, 2018 – present
- Volumes: 16
- icon

Sūji de Asobo (数字であそぼ。; lit. 'Playing with Numbers') is a Japanese manga series written and illustrated by Murako Kinuta. It has been serialized in Shogakukan's josei manga magazine Flowers since June 2018, with its chapters collected in 16 tankōbon volumes as of July 2026.

The series won the 69th Shogakukan Manga Award in 2024.

== Publication ==
Written and illustrated by Murako Kinuta, Sūji de Asobo started in Shogakukan's josei manga magazine Flowers on June 28, 2018. Shogakukan has collected its chapters into individual tankōbon volumes. The first volume was released on December 10, 2018. As of July 9, 2026, 16 volumes have been released.

=== Volumes ===
No.	Japanese release date	Japanese ISBN
1	December 10, 2018	978-4-09-870281-7
2	June 10, 2019	978-4-09-870452-1
3	December 10, 2019	978-4-09-870665-5
4	May 8, 2020	978-4-09-871024-9
5	January 8, 2021	978-4-09-871274-8
6	July 9, 2021	978-4-09-871298-4
7	January 7, 2022	978-4-09-871560-2
8	September 8, 2022	978-4-09-871714-9
9	March 9, 2023	978-4-09-872033-0
10	August 10, 2023	978-4-09-872213-6
11	April 10, 2024	978-4-09-872563-2
12	September 10, 2024	978-4-09-872677-6
13	February 10, 2025	978-4-09-872895-4
14	July 10, 2025	978-4-09-873121-3
15	January 9, 2026	978-4-09-873293-7
16	July 9, 2026	978-4-09-873419-1

== Reception ==
Along with The Elusive Samurai, Frieren: Beyond Journey's End, and Trillion Game, Sūji de Asobo won the 69th Shogakukan Manga Award in 2024. (Note: Since 2023 the nominees are not divided into categories.)
