= Sense of Gender Awards =

Annual fiction book awards

- Awarded for: Japanese science fiction
- Country: Japan
- Presented by: Japanese Association for Gender, Fantasy & Science Fiction
- First award: 2001
- Website: Official website

The Sense of Gender Awards are annual awards given by the Japanese Association for Gender, Fantasy & Science Fiction since 2001. It is awarded for the science fiction or fantasy fiction work published in the Japanese language in the prior year, which best "explore and deepen the concept of Gender." An award is also given for works that have been translated into Japanese.

The organization that gives the award is known as the Japanese Association for Feminist Fantasy and Science Fiction. The award and organization were founded by science fiction critic Mari Kotani, professional SF reviewer Reona Kashiwazaki, and Noriko Maki, the chair of the Japanese science fiction fandom confederation.

They are sometimes called the "Japanese version of the Tiptree Awards". Past winners include Fumi Yoshinaga; N. K. Jemisin; and Eileen Gunn.

== List of winners ==
=== Grand Prize of the Sense of Gender Award ===
Year	English title	Author
2001	The Scarlet Wizard	Sunako Kayata
2002	The Book of Cosmos	Megumi Kobayashi
2003	The Institution in Crystal	Yoriko Shono
2004	Amazonia	Chise Kasuya
2005	Through the Marshy Woods	Kaho Nashiki
2006	The Ragged-Skin Girl: Angel in the Deserted Garden 2	Hirotaka Tobi
2007	Canine-Sexuality	Rieko Matsuura
2008	Body Temperatures of Hermaphrodites	Terumi Ojima
2009	Frankenstein Biscuit	Akira
2010	The Palace of Flower Dragons	Sayuri Ueda
2011	Schräge Music	Yumiko Kawahara
2012	Eternal Wilderness (trilogy)	Shimobu Suga
2013	Who will I see?	Hiroe Suga
2014	Yurei Tower	Taro Nogizaka
2015	Omegaverse	N/A
2016	In This Corner of the World	Fumiyo Kōno
2017	I Want You	Natsuki Furuyata
2018	Collection System	Tanaka Tako
2019	Howling at the Moon	Yukiko Seike
2020	The Promised Neverland	Kaiu Shirai and Posuka Demizu
2021	An Older Guy's VR First Love	Tomoko Bōryoku
2022	Raven of the Inner Palace	Kōko Shirakawa and Ayuko
2023	The Birth of Kitaro: The Mystery of Gegege	Go Koga
2023	Forgotten Stories	Takadono Madoka
2024	Land of the Lustrous	Ichikawa Haruko

=== Best Sense of Gender Award in Translation ===
Year	English title	Author
2005	Venus Plus X	Theodore Sturgeon
2006	Stable Strategies and Others	Eileen Gunn
2007	A Brother's Price	Wen Spencer
2008	Carmen Dog	Carol Emshwiller
2008	The Privilege of the Sword	Ellen Kushner
2009	Perdido Street Station	China Miéville
2010	Genesis	Bernard Beckett
2011	The Hundred Thousand Kingdoms	N. K. Jemisin
2012	The Parasol Protectorate Series	Gail Carriger
2012	Legend	Marie Lu

=== Special awards ===
Year	English title	Author
2004	Bremen II	Kawahara Izumi
2004*	Alien Bedfellows	Mari Kotani
2005	Ōoku: The Inner Chambers	Fumi Yoshinaga
2006	Japan Sinks	Shinji Higuchi
2007	Chikita GuGu	Tono
2007	Love Pistols	Kotobuki Tarako
2011	Puella Magi Madoka Magica	Gen Urobuchi and Akiyuki Shinbo
2011	In the Ending World	Chise Kasuya
2019	Family Land	Ichi Sawamura
2024	Sentimental Phantasmagoria	Haruyo Utsugi

*declined

=== Other Awards ===
Various awards

Year	Award Name	English title	Author
2004	Topic Award	Russentiment	Kengo Hanazawa
2009	Topic Award	Hamlet Syndrome	Kabayama Sanei
2010	Topic Award	Swallowtail Artificial Girl Sales Office	Machito Ito
2011	Sisterhood Award	Puella Magi Madoka Magica	Akiyuki Shinbo
2011	Sisterhood Award	In a World That Continues to End	Tomoyo Kasuya
2012	Lifetime Achievement Award	Nanohana and all her works	Moto Hagio
2014	Artificial Intelligence Special Award	My Neighbor Robot	Nishi UKO
2016	Soar into the Future Idol Award	The Last and First Idol	Kusanohara Ran
2018	Best Couple Award	Yomenusubito	Kyushu Manji
2021	SOG Hall of Fame Award	Ōoku: The Inner Chambers	Yoshinaga Fumi
2022	SF Original Intentions Award	The Karamazov Brothers and Sisters: Original Version	Takano Fumio

== See also ==
- James Tiptree Jr. Award
- Nihon SF Taisho Award
- Seiun Award
