= A Cruel God Reigns =

Japanese manga series

- Cover of the first tankōbon volume, featuring Jeremy

残酷な神が支配する (Zankokuna Kami ga Shihai Suru)
- Genre: Drama
- Created by: Moto Hagio
- Manga
- Written by: Moto Hagio
- Published by: Shogakukan
- Magazine: Petit Flower
- Original run: 1992 – 2001
- Volumes: 17

A Cruel God Reigns (Japanese: 残酷な神が支配する, Hepburn: Zankokuna Kami ga Shihai Suru) (Note: Alternately translated and titled in English as A Savage God Reigns; A Cruel God Rules in Heaven; and After Us, The Savage God.) is a Japanese manga series written and illustrated by Moto Hagio. It was originally serialized in the manga magazine Petit Flower from 1992 to 2001, and published as seventeen tankōbon volumes (collected editions) by Shogakukan. The series follows Jeremy Butler, a teenage boy who murders his physically and sexually abusive stepfather. In 1997, A Cruel God Reigns was recognized with the inaugural Tezuka Osamu Cultural Prize Award for Excellence.

== Plot ==
Fifteen-year-old Jeremy Butler moves from Boston to Hampstead with his mother Sandra after she marries Greg Lowland, a widowed British aristocrat. While Greg maintains an idyllic relationship with Sandra, he regularly subjects Jeremy to physical, psychological, and sexual abuse. Fearful that his emotionally fragile mother may re-attempt suicide if the truth is exposed, Jeremy initially bears the abuse in silence. As the abuse intensifies, Jeremy conspires to kill Greg by tampering with the brakes in his stepfather's car, though the resulting accident kills both Greg and Sandra.

Ian Lowland, Jeremy's adult stepbrother from Greg's previous marriage, suspects that Jeremy is responsible for his father's death. When he attempts to convince Jeremy to confess to his actions, Jeremy flees to Boston and begins injecting heroin to suppress the memory of his trauma, supporting his drug use through prostitution. Some time later, Ian discovers the truth of Greg's abuse of Jeremy; horrified by his father's actions and his own ignorance of them, he becomes Jeremy's caretaker to make amends for his father's abuse. As Ian and Jeremy grow closer, Ian finds himself disturbed by the growing sexual attraction he feels towards his stepbrother, and begins to fear that he may ultimately subject Jeremy to the same abuse that his father once did.

== Primary characters ==
Jeremy Butler (ジェルミ・バトラー, Jerumi Batorā)
A fifteen-year-old boy from Boston who is physically and sexually abused by his stepfather Greg. After his plan to murder Greg results in the deaths of both his stepfather and his mother Sandra, he descends into drug use and prostitution. He later enters a drug rehabilitation facility, and is cared for by his stepbrother Ian.
Greg Lowland (グレッグ・ローランド, Gureggu Rōrando)
A wealthy English aristocrat and businessman who marries Jeremy's mother Sandra. His outwardly chivalrous personality conceals his true cruel and sadistic nature, and his abuse of both Jeremy and his sister-in-law Natasha. He is killed after Jeremy tampers with the brakes in his car.
Ian Lowland (イアン・ローランド, Ian Rōrando)
Greg's eldest son from his previous marriage. He is handsome and free-spirited, but also somewhat insensitive and self-regarding. He suspects Jeremy of murdering his father;
Sandra (サンドラ, Sandora)
Jeremy's widowed mother and Greg's second wife. The daughter of a formerly wealthy family who now lives in genteel poverty, Sandra is emotionally fragile and deeply dependent on her son. She is unintentionally killed by Jeremy in the same car accident that kills Greg.
Matt Lowland (マット・ローランド, Matto Rōrando)
Greg's second son, and Ian's brother.
Natasha (ナターシャ, Natāsha)
The sister of Greg's deceased first wife Lilya, and Ian and Matt's maternal aunt.
Nadia (ナディア, Nadia)
Ian's girlfriend. An organist, she has a troubled family background and has a habit of integrating herself into the lives of traumatized people. She leaves Ian after he begins to develop romantic feelings for Jeremy, though she tries (and fails) to get back together with him several times.

== Development and release ==
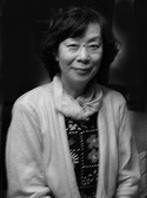
Hagio in 2008

In 1980, Hagio's frequent editor Junya Yamamoto became the editor-in-chief of Petit Flower, a new manga magazine published by Shogakukan aimed at an audience of adult women. Yamamoto granted Hagio full artistic and editorial freedom over the manga she published in Petit Flower, allowing her to create series with more mature themes and subject material relative to her previous works. Notable titles published by Hagio in Petit Flower prior to A Cruel God Reigns include her 1980 crime thriller Mesh, which focuses on parricide in the drug trade, and her 1985 post-apocalyptic science fiction series Marginal.

A Cruel God Reigns was serialized in Petit Flower from 1992 to 2001. The series is Hagio's longest, composing over 3,000 pages in total, though she originally planned it to be serialized over the course of just four years. Hagio drew inspiration for the series from a book she read about child abuse in the 1970s, and how people who are abused as children carry the trauma of that abuse as they age. The title of the series is a reference to Al Alvarez's 1971 study The Savage God: A Study of Suicide, whose title is in turn is a reference to a diary entry written by W. B. Yeats criticizing modernism.

Following the conclusion of A Cruel God Reigns in 2001, Hagio took a year-long hiatus from creating manga before launching her subsequent series Otherworld Barbara in 2002.

=== List of volumes ===
Shogakukan published A Cruel God Reigns as 17 tankōbon volumes between March 19, 1993, and August 20, 2001. It later republished the series as 10 kanzenban volumes between October 15, 2004, and February 15, 2005. The manga has been published in Italy by J-POP Manga.

No.	Release date	ISBN
1	March 19, 1993	4-09-172171-0
2	August 31, 1993	4-09-172172-9
3	February 19, 1994	4-09-172173-7
4	October 20, 1994	4-09-172174-5
5	April 20, 1995	4-09-172175-3
6	October 20, 1995	4-09-172176-1
7	April 20, 1996	4-09-172177-X
8	October 19, 1996	4-09-172178-8
9	May 20, 1997	4-09-172179-6
10	September 20, 1997	4-09-172180-X
11	March 20, 1998	4-09-172241-5
12	October 20, 1998	4-09-172242-3
13	April 20, 1999	4-09-172243-1
14	November 20, 1999	4-09-172244-X
15	May 20, 2000	4-09-172245-8
16	January 20, 2001	4-09-172246-6
17	August 20, 2001	4-09-172247-4

== Reception and analysis ==
Translator and cultural anthropologist Rachel Thorn praised A Cruel God Reigns as an "amazing contribution to graphic literature", calling it "beautifully executed, yet brutal in its frankness and often painful to read". She describes the series as an "adult version" of Hagio's 1974 manga series The Heart of Thomas, noting numerous similarities in plot and thematic material; Hagio has concurred with this assessment, noting that she had to "consciously strive for a different image" when creating A Cruel God Reigns to differentiate it from The Heart of Thomas. Sociologist and cultural historian Mark McLelland cites A Cruel God Reigns alongside Marimo Ragawa's New York New York as an example of a manga in which depictions of male-male sexual violence mirror that of sexual violence committed by men against women, where the female reader is "clearly supposed to identify" with the abused male character though the manner in which they are "placed in a subordinate (read, feminine) position."

The title of the series inspired the title of the song "A Cruel Angel's Thesis", the theme of the anime television series Neon Genesis Evangelion.
