= Petit Flower =

Japanese manga magazine

Petit Flower プチフラワー
- Cover of the September 1984 issue
- Categories: Shōjo manga
- First issue: 1980
- Final issue: March 2002
- Company: Shogakukan
- Country: Japan
- Based in: Tokyo
- Language: Japanese

Petit Flower (Japanese: プチフラワー, Hepburn: Puchifurawā) was a Japanese shōjo manga magazine published by Shogakukan. Founded in 1980, the magazine ceased publication in March 2002, when it was replaced by the magazine Flowers.

== History ==
Shogakukan began publishing Petit Flower as a regular magazine in 1980, after the success of Flower Comic, a one-off special issue of the manga magazine Bessatsu Shōjo Comic. The magazine targeted a readership of girls and women in their late teens to mid-20s. The magazine was initially edited by Junya Yamamoto, who was also the editor of Bessatsu Shōjo Comic; consequently, the artists published in Petit Flower typically were given limited editorial support but a significant degree of editorial freedom.

The magazine published works by several of Shogakukan's most notable female manga artists, such as Moto Hagio and Keiko Takemiya. It is credited with launching the careers of Reiko Okano and Keiko Nishi. Petit Flower folded in March 2002, and was replaced the following month with the magazine Flowers.

== Serializations and one-shots ==
- Mesh by Moto Hagio (1980–1984)
- The Visitor by Moto Hagio (1980)
- Yumemiru Wakusei by Shio Satō (1980–1984)
- Kaze to Ki no Uta by Keiko Takemiya (1981–1984) (Note: Began serialization in Sho-Comi in 1976.)
- Yume no Ishibumi by Toshie Kihara (1982–1997)
- 4/4 by Moto Hagio (1983)
- Kawa yori mo Nagaku Yuruyaka ni by Akimi Yoshida (1983–1985)
- Fancy Dance by Reiko Okano (1984–1990)
- Hanshin: Half-God by Moto Hagio (1984)
- One Zero by Shio Satō (1984–1986)
- X+Y by Moto Hagio (1984)
- Blue Moon by Masumi Moriwaki (1985–1988)
- Marginal by Moto Hagio (1985–1987)
- Tomoi by Wakuni Akisato (1985–1986)
- Watashi o Tsuki made Tsuretette! by Keiko Takemiya (1985–1986)
- Lucky Jō-chan no Atarashii Shigoto by Fumiko Takano (1986–1987)
- Iguana Girl by Moto Hagio (1992)
- A Cruel God Reigns by Moto Hagio (1993–2001)
- Amakusa 1637 by Michiyo Akaishi (2000–2002) (Note: Continued serialization in Flowers.)
