= The Poe Clan =

Japanese manga series by Moto Hagio

- Cover of the first Japanese paperback volume, featuring Edgar (left) and Marybelle (right)

ポーの一族 (Pō no Ichizoku)
- Genre: Fantasy; Gothic horror
- Manga
- Written by: Moto Hagio
- Published by: Shogakukan
- English publisher: NA: Fantagraphics Books
- Imprint: Flower Comics
- Magazine: Bessatsu Shōjo Comic; (March 1972 – June 1976); Shūkan Shōjo Comic; (September 1975); Flowers; (July 2016 – present)
- Original run: Initial run March 1972 – June 1976; Continued run July 2016 – present
- Volumes: 7
- Notable adaptations
- NHK radio drama, 1980; Shogakukan audio drama, 2007; E-Star audio drama, 2013; TV Asahi live-action TV drama, 2016; Takarazuka Revue stage play, 2018, 2021 & 2026

The Poe Clan (Japanese: ポーの一族, Hepburn: Pō no Ichizoku) is a Japanese manga series written and illustrated by Moto Hagio. It was initially serialized in the manga magazines Bessatsu Shōjo Comic and Shūkan Shōjo Comic from 1972 to 1976, while a revival of the series has been serialized in Flowers since 2016. The Poe Clan is composed of a series of non-chronological stories set between the 18th and 21st centuries that follow the life of Edgar Portsnell, a teenage vampire.

The manga has been collected into seven tankōbon volumes by the publishing house Shogakukan, and was the first shōjo manga series to be published by the company in this format. The Poe Clan has been adapted multiple times, notably as a radio drama, a series of CD audio dramas, a live-action television drama, and a Takarazuka Revue stage play. Fantagraphics Books licensed the manga for an English-language release in North America to be published in two omnibus volumes, the first of which was released in 2019. The Poe Clan was a critical and commercial success upon its release, winning the Shogakukan Manga Award in 1975. The series significantly influenced shōjo manga, the shōnen-ai (male-male romance) genre, and vampire literature.

== Synopsis ==
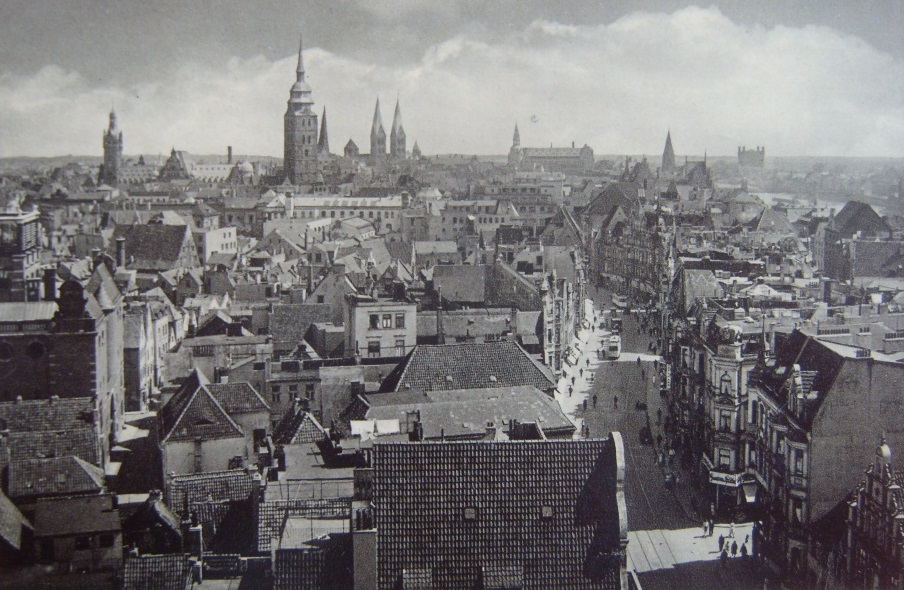
The city of Bremen in 1939; the chapter "Glensmith's Diary" takes place in the city between 1922 and 1959.

The Poe Clan is composed of a series of non-chronological stories set in Europe, primarily England and Germany, between the 18th and 21st centuries. The series chronicles the life of Edgar Portsnell and his two traveling companions: his younger sister Marybelle Portsnell, and his friend Alan Twilight. All three are members of the titular Poe clan, a group of immortal "vampirnellas" (vampires) (Note: In the original Japanese text, vampirnellas are referred to as "vampanellas" (バンパネラ).) who do not age and subsist on human blood. (Note: In contrast to traditional vampires, vampirnellas consume blood merely by touching their hands against the neck of their victim; they possess fangs which can also used to drink blood, but they are mainly used to intimidate mortals. In lieu of blood, vampirnellas can also consume rose oil for sustenance.)

The clan maintains a strict code of only converting humans when they have reached adulthood, but by a confluence of circumstances, Edgar is made into a vampirnella at the age of fourteen. Edgar finds he is isolated from both the human world as a result of his immortality, and from the adult vampirnellas of the clan due to his eternally-teenaged body. Overcome by loneliness, he converts Marybelle when she is thirteen, only to find his loneliness replaced by the remorse of having taken his sister's humanity; he vows to dedicate his life to her happiness and well-being.

Several decades pass and Marybelle meets and falls in love with Alan, who at the time is a human teenager. Shortly thereafter, she and Edgar's adoptive parents are killed by humans who discover their vampirnella nature. Edgar is overwhelmed by grief; Alan, who has himself fallen into despair upon learning that he is to be wed in an arranged marriage, agrees to be converted by Edgar. The two boys form a close companionship, and the series follows their exploits over the subsequent century. While the particulars of Edgar and Alan's adventures vary, the series broadly explores the concept of time from the conflicting perspectives of mortality and immortality: the former represented by the humans they encounter, to whom they represent the dream of eternal youth; and the latter represented by Edgar, who must live with "the loneliness of everlasting life."

== Primary characters ==
Edgar Portsnell (エドガー・ポーツネル, Edogā Pōtsuneru)
Born in 1740 as Edgar Evans, one of the two illegitimate children of a British aristocrat. Edgar and his sister Marybelle are abandoned as children in a forest to die of exposure; they are discovered by Hannah Poe, a woman who brings the children to be raised in the manor house where she lives. At the age of 11, Edgar discovers that the residents of the manor are vampirnellas, and that he will be converted into one as an adult. When the villagers learn the secret of the manor, the clan is forced to flee, and Edgar is made into a vampirnella at the age of fourteen.
Marybelle Portsnell (メリーベル・ポーツネル, Merīberu Pōtsuneru)
Edgar's sister, born in 1744 as Marybelle Evans. She is converted into a vampirnella at the age of thirteen by Edgar. In 1879 she is killed by John Clifford, a doctor who discovers the truth about her vampirnella identity.
Alan Twilight (アラン・トワイライト, Aran Towairaito)
A teenage boy who Edgar and Marybelle encounter in London in 1879. He is converted into a vampirnella at the age of fourteen by Edgar.

== Development ==
=== Context ===
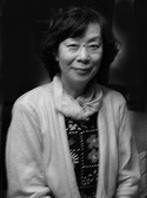
Moto Hagio in 2008

Japan has no tradition of vampires in literature and other media; the archetype was imported from works of western fiction beginning in the 1930s. Science fiction critic Mari Kotani has argued that in Japan, the vampire as a specifically western figure represents a hostile "other," particularly following the Second World War and subsequent occupation of Japan by the United States. However, Kotani notes that in shōjo manga (girls' comics), the west is often depicted as idealized and utopian, typically a result of the cultural influence of Hollywood cinema, American literature, and western fashion; the figure of the vampire, as a western cultural product, is thus viewed positively in this shōjo context.

In her youth, Moto Hagio disliked stories featuring vampires, as they were depicted as "villains who attack human beings." In 1962, the manga artist Shotaro Ishinomori published the one-shot (single-chapter) manga Mist, Roses and Stars, a science fiction story about the tragic life of a vampire girl, in the manga magazine Shōjo Club. Hagio became inspired by the manga, and began to conceive of her own "beautiful vampire story" about a vampire who "long[s] to return to a normal human existence" but is "rejected by humanity."

In 1971 Hagio published The November Gymnasium, a one-shot about an all-boys school written as an early adaptation of her later series The Heart of Thomas. The story made Hagio realize that she preferred writing stories about male protagonists, and she thus decided to have the protagonist of her vampire story be a boy. She created the term "vampirnella" after misreading a word while searching for terms that could be used as a substitute for "vampire"; attracted to the vaguely Italian sound of her invention, she adopted it for the series. At the same time, Hagio had developed an interest in costumes; she began to write The Poe Clan after becoming inspired by the idea of a story about an immortal protagonist who wears the attire of different historical periods throughout their life.

=== Original production and publication ===
Hagio made her debut as a manga artist in 1969; by 1972 she was still considered as a novice, and thus was only permitted by her editor Junya Yamamoto to publish short one-shots. Hagio originally conceived of The Poe Clan as a trilogy, with each part consisting of roughly one hundred pages and set respectively in the 18th, 19th, and 20th centuries. In order to publish the story under these editorial constraints, Hagio adopted two strategies: first, she began writing The Poe Clan as a series of one-shots that functioned as standalone stories, but which featured serial-like interrelated narratives and recurring characters. Second, she focused early chapters of The Poe Clan on Marybelle and other female characters, as shōjo manga stories featuring male protagonists were less readily accepted in this era.

In the February 1972 issue of Bessatsu Shōjo Comic, Hagio announced that she would begin publishing a story in the magazine on vampirism; the announcement took the form of an illustrated poem depicting Edgar and Marybelle entwined. Limpid Locks of Silver, the first chapter of what would become The Poe Clan, was published in the subsequent March 1972 issue. Hagio wrote several other unrelated manga one-shots in the next several issues of the magazine before publishing the second chapter of The Poe Clan in July 1972. Upon the publication of the third chapter in August 1972, Yamamoto realized that Hagio was creating a serialization; faced with this fait accompli, he allowed The Poe Clan to continue as an official serial, permitting Hagio to freely publish her originally planned trilogy.

Hagio concluded her original trilogy in July 1973, but began conceiving of new chapters for the series during its serialization; she spent the next year developing new ideas for The Poe Clan before launching her next serialization, The Heart of Thomas, in May 1974. In June 1974, Shogakukan launched its literary imprint Flower Comics, which publishes tankōbon (collected volume) editions of shōjo manga serialized in the company's magazines; The Poe Clan was the first manga series to be released under the imprint. The tankōbon edition of The Poe Clan sold out its initial print run of 30,000 copies in three days, an unprecedented sales volume at the time for a shōjo manga series that had not been adapted into an anime. Shogakukan encouraged Hagio to conclude the then-unpopular The Heart of Thomas to focus on The Poe Clan, though Hagio insisted on continuing the series.

Hagio completed The Heart of Thomas in December 1974; in that same issue, Bessatsu Shōjo Comic published a new illustrated poem by Hagio announcing the publication of nine new chapters of The Poe Clan. The series resumed publication in January 1975, with eight chapters published in Bessatsu Shōjo Comic and one chapter in Shūkan Shōjo Comic, with the final chapter of the series published in June 1976.

=== Revival ===
Following the conclusion of The Poe Clan in 1976, Hagio repeatedly declined requests to create new chapters of the series. Upon turning 60 years old in 2009, Hagio began to fear that she would no longer be able to write manga due to declining health, and was convinced by her friend and science fiction writer Baku Yumemakura to create Poe no Ichizoku: Haru no Yume (春の夢; lit. "The Poe Clan: Spring's Dream"), a one-shot sequel to The Poe Clan. Haru no Yume was published on May 28, 2016, in the July issue of Shogakukan's manga magazine Flowers, marking the 40th anniversary of the conclusion of the original series. Shogakukan printed 50,000 copies of the issue, an increase from the magazine's normal circulation of 33,000; the issue sold out in one day regardless, prompting a second printing of 15,000 issues. Hagio subsequently wrote an additional chapter of Haru no Yume, which was published in the May 2017 issue of Flowers; both chapters were compiled as a collected volume published in July 2017.

Hagio has continued to create additional sequels to The Poe Clan following the conclusion of Haru no Yume:

- Poe no Ichizoku: Unicorn (ポーの一族 ユニコーン), which began serialization in the May 2018 issue of Flowers before going on hiatus after the July 2018 issue. The series returned in the March 2019 issue, and concluded in the June 2019 issue. Unicorn was collected as a hardcover released in July 2019.
- Poe no Ichizoku: Himitsu no Hanazono (ポーの一族 秘密 の 花園; lit. "The Poe Clan: The Secret Garden"), the first chapter of which was published in Flowers in the May 2019 issue. The series immediately went on hiatus, and returned in the June 2020 issue. Its second and last volume shipped in November 2021.
- Poe no Ichizoku: Getsuyōbi wa Kirai (ポーの一族 月曜日はキライ; lit. "The Poe Clan: I Hate Mondays"), a short comedic one-shot, was published in the July 2020 issue of Flowers on May 28, 2020.
- Poe no Ichizoku: Ao no Pandora (ポーの一族 青のパンドラ; lit. "The Poe Clan: Blue Pandora"), which began serialization in the July 2022 issue of Flowers on May 27, 2022.

== Media ==
=== Manga ===
==== Chapters ====
The following is a list of chapters of The Poe Clan, with officially-translated English-language titles noted where applicable. The following chapters of The Poe Clan were originally serialized in Bessatsu Shōjo Comic:

- Alone in 1971 (1971年のひとりごと, 1971-nen no Hitorigoto), February 1972 (Note: Illustrated poem.)
- Limpid Locks of Silver (すきとおった銀の髪, Sukitōtta Gin no Kami), March 1972
- The Poe Village (ポーの村, Poe no Mura), July 1972
- Glensmith's Diary (グレンスミスの日記, Glensmith no Nikki), August 1972
- The Poe Clan (ポーの一族, Poe no Ichizoku), September – December 1972
- Marybelle and the Silver Rose (メリーベルと銀のばら, Marybelle to Gin no Bara), January – March 1973
- The Bird's Nest (小鳥の巣, Kotori no Su), April – July 1973
- Poe no Densetsu ni Yosete (ポーの伝説に寄せて; "On the Legend of Poe"), December 1974
- Evans no Isho (エヴァンズの遺書; "Evans' Will"), January – February 1975
- Penny Rain (ペニー・レイン), May 1975
- Liddell, Mori no Naka (リデル・森の中; "Liddell Woods"), June 1975
- Rampton wa Kataru (ランプトンは語る; "Lampton Tells Us"), July 1975
- Piccadilly Shichiji (ピカデリー7時; "Piccadilly 7pm"), August 1975
- Holmes no Bōshi (ホームズの帽子; "Holmes' Hat"), November 1975
- Isshūkan (一週間; "One Week"), December 1975
- Edith (エディス), April – June 1976

The following chapter was originally serialized in Shūkan Shōjo Comic:

- Harukana Kuni no Hana ya Kotori (はるかな国の花や小鳥; "Flowers and Birds in Faraway Lands"), September 1975

The following chapters were originally serialized in Flowers:

- Haru no Yume (春の夢; "Spring's Dream"), July 2016 – July 2017
- Unicorn (ユニコーン), July 2018 – June 2019
- Himitsu no Hanazono (秘密の花園; "The Secret Garden"), July 2019 – November 2021
- Getsuyōbi wa Kirai (月曜日はキライ; "I Hate Mondays"), July 2020
- Ao no Pandora (ポーの一族 青のパンドラ; "Blue Pandora"), July 2022 – present

==== Collected editions ====
The Poe Clan has been collected into seven tankōbon volumes published by Shogakukan under the Flower Comics imprint, with the first volume released on May 28, 1974, and the last volume released on August 11, 1976. The Poe Clan was the first shōjo manga Shogakukan ever published in trade paperback format. Shogakukan later re-released the entire series in three bunkoban volumes on July 17, 1998, and then again in two wide-ban volumes on November 26, 2007, and December 21, 2007, respectively; and finally, in two "premium edition" volumes released on February 26, 2019.

Fantagraphics Books licensed the original run of the manga for an English-language release in North America, published in two hardcover omnibus volumes translated by Rachel Thorn. The first volume was released on August 20, 2019, and the second on September 20, 2022. Fantagraphic is slated to begin publishing an English translation of the revival of the series in 2025. Internationally, the manga is licensed in Italian by Ronin Manga, Spanish by Ediciones Tomodomo, and Polish by Japonica Polonica Fantastica.

=== Audio dramas ===
NHK-FM produced a six-part radio drama adaptation of The Poe Clan that aired on the station from January 1 to January 6, 1980. The adaptation was directed by Tokio Ōtani from a script written by Jun Takada, with sound effects by Shōichi Haraguchi and Tadashi Iwai, and starred Takarazuka Revue actresses Anna Jun in various male roles and Haruka Kurara as Edgar and in various female roles. Radio Kansai produced a radio drama adaptation of the series that aired on the station on October 6, 2007; the drama starred Romi Park as Edgar and Mitsuki Saiga as Alan.

Shogakukan released a series of six audio drama CDs adapting The Poe Clan from December 2007 to May 2008. Each volume covered a different generation of the Poe family and starred Romi Park as Edgar, Mitsuki Saiga as Alan, and Yuka Inokuchi as Marybelle. The first four volumes also starred Kōji Ishitobi as Baron Portsnell and Yōko Sasaki as Sheila Portsnell.

The drama CD label E-Star released an audio drama adaptation of The Poe Clan on March 22, 2013. It stars Yoshitsugu Matsuoka as Edgar, Takuya Eguchi as Alan, Daisuke Hirakawa as Mathias, Takaya Hashi as Aubin, Toshihiko Seki as Clifford, Kazuma Horie as Robin, and Takurou Nakakuni as a thief.

=== Live-action television drama ===
In February 2016, TV Asahi announced they would produce a television drama adaptation of the manga along with Production I.G and Atmovie. Featuring an original story scripted by Katsuhide Suzuki and directed by Katsuyuki Motohiro, Stranger ~Bakemono ga Jiken wo Abaku~ (ストレンジャー〜バケモノが事件を暴く〜; lit. "Stranger: Disclosing the Monster Incident") shares the same worldview of Hagio's manga. Its single episode was broadcast on March 27, 2016, and follows Akira Misugi (Shingo Katori), a Taishō era doctor who is mutated into a vampirnella by Maria (Ayami Nakajō), a child descendant of a vampirnella, when he attempts to commit suicide because of the death of his wife and child.

=== Theater ===
In 2018, the all-female Takarazuka Revue's Flower Troupe adapted a chapter of The Poe Clan into a stage musical titled Musical Gothic: The Poe Clan (ミュージカル・ゴシック『ポーの一族』, Myūjikaru Goshikku: Pō no Ichizoku). It was written and directed by Shūichirō Koike, who originally approached Hagio about creating a musical in 1985, and starred Rio Asumi as Edgar Portsnell, Rei Yuzuka as Alan Twilight, and Ayase Senna as Baroness Sheila Portsnell. The musical ran at the Takarazuka Grand Theater from January 1 to February 5, 2018, and then at the Tokyo Takarazuka Theater from February 16 to March 25, 2018. Its final performance was broadcast live to movie theaters in Japan, Hong Kong, and Taiwan. A performance filmed in January at the Takarazuka Grand Theater was released on Blu-ray and DVD in Japan on March 20, 2018. The Takarazuka version deemphasizes the sexual themes in the manga version and instead highlights the idea that unrelated individuals can become a clan-like family.

In 2021, Shūichirō Koike directed a revival of Musical Gothic: The Poe Clan, this time with a cast composed of both men and women. Rio Asumi returned to reprise her role as Edgar Portsnell in her first musical performance since she left the Takarazuka Revue. New cast members included Airi Kisaki as Marybelle Portsnell, Yudai Chiba as Alan Twilight, and Nene Yumesaki as Baroness Sheila Portsnell, among others. The musical ran at the Umeda Arts Theater in Osaka from January 11 to January 26, 2021; then at the Tokyo International Forum from February 3 to February 17, 2021; and finally, at the Misono-za in Nagoya from February 23 to February 28, 2021. Several performances were streamed online as pay-per-view events on February 7, February 13, and February 28, 2021. The musical's final performance was broadcast live to movie theaters in Japan, Hong Kong, and Taiwan; it was also streamed online in Hong Kong and Taiwan. A filmed performance was released on DVD in Japan on July 9, 2021.

== Reception and legacy ==
=== Critical response ===
Reviewing The Poe Clan for The Comics Journal, Helen Chazan writes that while the series is "not so consistent and refined as in [Hagio's] later comics," she praises its narrative that gradually "grows from a low-stakes short story into a complex serial" and "that in the hands of a less talented writer would be forgettable genre fare." Shaenon K. Garrity concurs in Otaku USA that while early chapters of The Poe Clan are "uneven and sometimes hard to follow," she praises the series' "mastery of composition, emotion, and visual storytelling," describing it as a "classic of modern Gothic horror." Rebecca Silverman similarly praises the artwork and story of the series in her review for Anime News Network, comparing it to My Platonic Sweetheart by Mark Twain and the Japanese concept of mono no aware.

=== Sales and accolades ===
By 2016, collected editions of The Poe Clan have collectively sold 3.5 million copies. The series won the 21st Shogakukan Manga Award in 1975, alongside Hagio's They Were Eleven and Golgo 13 by Saito Takao. Haru no Yume ranked second on the top 20 list of manga for female readers in the 2018 edition of Takarajimasha's Kono Manga ga Sugoi! guidebook, while Unicorn ranked sixth on the same list in the 2020 edition of the guidebook. Unicorn also ranked nineteenth on the 2019 "Book of the Year" list in Kadokawa Media Factory's Da Vinci magazine. In 2019, The Poe Clan was featured in the manga exhibition at the British Museum in London; the museum called the series "representative [of shōjo manga] of the period". In 2020, the English-language translation of The Poe Clan was nominated for the Eisner Award for Best U.S. Edition of International Material—Asia and the Harvey Award for Best Manga. In 2021, TV Asahi announced the results of a poll ranking the top 100 manga of all time, decided by 150,000 voters across Japan; The Poe Clan ranked 34th on the list.

=== Impact ===
Along with The Rose of Versailles by Riyoko Ikeda, The Poe Clan was among the first works of shōjo manga to be lauded and regarded seriously by manga critics. Shōjo manga was typically perceived as frivolous and of low quality, an attitude that changed as a result of works by the Year 24 Group, a grouping of female shōjo artists who emerged in the 1970s of which Hagio was a prominent member. The series particularly influenced vampire literature as one of the earliest works to depict vampires as romantic and tragic rather than predatory, and the shōnen-ai (male-male romance) genre in its rendering of the ambiguously homoerotic relationship between Edgar and Alan. Its critical and commercial success attracted the attention of a male readership that did not typically read shōjo manga, notably by science fiction writers Baku Yumemakura and Azusa Noa, whose works are influenced by The Poe Clan through their rendering of homoeroticism and bishōnen.
