= Otherworld Barbara =

Japanese manga series

- Cover of the first volume, featuring Kirya Kitakata

バルバラ異界 (Barubara Ikai)
- Genre: Science fiction
- Manga
- Written by: Moto Hagio
- Published by: Shogakukan
- English publisher: US: Fantagraphics Books
- Magazine: Flowers
- Original run: September 2002 – August 2005
- Volumes: 4

Otherworld Barbara (Japanese: バルバラ異界, Hepburn: Barubara Ikai) is a Japanese science fiction manga series written and illustrated by Moto Hagio. It is set in a near-future Japan, and begins with a girl, Jyujo Aoba, who has been in a coma since she was nine years old, who was discovered next to her parents' bodies, with their hearts inside her stomach. To discover why she killed her parents, a specialist enters her coma dreams and finds that Jyujo is dreaming about and simultaneously creating the future. The series was serialised in Shogakukan's Flowers between September 2002 and August 2005 and collected in four volumes. The series is licensed for release in the United States by Fantagraphics Books.

In 2006, Otherworld Barbara won the Grand Prize of the 27th Nihon SF Taisho Award

== Development ==
Hagio "wanted to do something about meat" when she created the story for Otherworld Barbara, and felt that the story "turned out kind of gross". Thorn felt that Hagio also used her interest in the right and left brain, and the origin of language. She read Noam Chomsky's Noam Chomsky on The Generative Enterprise, A discussion with Riny Hyybregts and Henk van Riemsdijk, Vilayanur S. Ramachandran's Phantoms in the Brain: Probing the Mysteries of the Human Mind, and Andrew B. Newberg's Why God Won't Go Away: Brain Science and the Biology of Belief.

== Volume list ==
No.	Release date	ISBN
1	June 26, 2003	4-09-167041-5
01. "The World Revolves Around Me" (世界の中心であるわたし, Sekai no Chūshin de Aru Watashi); 02. "Sleeping Beauty Nestles in Sleeping Blood and Roses" (眠り姫は眠る血とバラの中, Nemurihime wa Nemuru Chi to Bara no Naka); 03. "No Sword Dancing in the Park" (公園で剣舞を舞ってはならない, Kōen de Kenbu o Matte wa Naranai); 04. "His Name Is Despair; Her Name Is Hope" (彼の名は絶望 彼女の名は希望, Kare no Na wa Zetsubō Kanojo no Na Kibō); 05. "Whatever Became of Ezra?" (エズラはどこへ消えた？, Ezura wa Doko e Kieta?); 06. "See You in Roppongi" (六本木で会いましょう, Roppongi de Aimashō)
2	March 26, 2004	4-09-167042-3
07. "I Used to Carry You on My Shoulders" (きみに肩車してあげた, Kimi ni Kataguruma Shiteageta); 08. "I'm in the Fridge. Bon Appétit!" (冷蔵庫の中のわたしを食べて, Reizōko no Naka no Watashi o Tabete); 09. "We Were Swimming in the Martian Sea" (火星の海で泳いでいた, Kasei no Umi de Oyoideita); 10. "Welcome Home, Daddy" (お父さんお帰りなさい, Otō-san Okaerinasai); 11. "All Born October First" (お誕生日は同じ10月1日, O-tanjōbi wa Onaji Jū-gatsu Ichi-nichi); 12. "The Kasasagi Bakery in Higashi-Ikebukuro" (東池袋カササギのパン屋, Higashi-Ikebukuro Kasasagi no Panya)
3	December 20, 2004	4-09-167043-1
13. "The Long, Long Genome Story" (長い長い遺伝子(ゲノム)の物語, Nagai Nagai Genomu no Monogatari); 14. "There Are Things Even Grown-ups Don't Know" (大人にだってわからない, Otona ni Datte Wakaranai); 15. "The Long Way 'Round to Engaru" (遠軽への遠い道, Engaru e no Tōi Michi); 16. "And We Shall Become One" (ひとつになりましょう, Hototsu ni Narimashō); 17. "Nobody Knows Your Name" (誰もあなたの名前を知らない, Dare mo Anata no Namae o Shiranai); 18. "A First Time for Everything" (はじめてのことだから, Hajimete no Koto Da kara)
4	September 26, 2005	4-09-167044-X
19. "I Have Always Loved You" (ずっとあなたを愛していた, Zutto Anata o Aishiteita); 20. "A Message from the Dead" (死者からのメッセージ, Shisha kara no Messāji); 21. "The Fall of Barbara" (バルバラ崩壊, Barubara Hōkai); 22. "Hana-Koganei Hikobae Day Care Center" (花小金井ヒコバエ保育園, Hana-Koganei Hikobae Hoikuen); 23. "Give Me My Kiriya Back" (ぼくのキリヤをかえしてくれ, Boku no Kiriya o Kaeshite Kure); 24. "From a Distant Yesterday to a Distant Tomorrow" (遠い昨日から遠い明日へ, Tōi Kinō kara Toi Ashita e)

== Reception ==
Otherworld Barbara won the Grand Prize of the 27th Nihon SF Taisho Award by the Science Fiction and Fantasy Writers of Japan (SFWJ) in 2006 and was the first manga in 23 years to have won this award. Paste Magazine praised Hagio's sense of pacing.
