= Star Red =

Japanese manga series

- Volume one tankōbon cover, featuring Sei

スター・レッド
- Genre: Science fiction
- Created by: Moto Hagio
- Manga
- Written by: Moto Hagio
- Published by: Shogakukan
- Imprint: Flower Comics
- Magazine: Shūkan Shōjo Comic
- Original run: May 28, 1978 – February 5, 1979
- Volumes: 3

Star Red (Japanese: スター・レッド, Hepburn: Sutā Reddo) is a Japanese science fiction manga series written and illustrated by Moto Hagio. It was serialized in Shogakukan's manga magazine Shūkan Shōjo Comic from 1978 to 1979.

== Synopsis ==
In the near future, overpopulation on Earth has led humanity to colonize space. Mars was colonized in 2050, though extremely high rates of stillbirth among the colonists made long-term colonization impossible; the planet was transformed into a prison in 2070 before being abandoned in 2150. Some children born on Mars developed genetic mutations giving them parapsychological powers, which became more potent across subsequent generations of Martians. When humanity attempted to re-colonize Mars in 2264, they discovered the surviving Martian population, and attempted to exterminate and experiment upon them.

The primary action of the series focuses on Sei Red (レッド・星, Reddo Sei), a fifth generation Martian possessing the power of telepathy, telekinesis, and teleportation. She is exiled to Earth in 2276, where she is forced to conceal her Martian identity. There she encounters Erg (エルグ, Erugu), an alien who comes into conflict with both humanity and the Martians. Sei ultimately dies, but her consciousness survives in a sort of limbo; there she meets various spirits with vague sexual identities, which allow her to be reborn as a sixth generation Martian.

== Production and release ==
Star Red was conceived after Hagio's editor at Shūkan Shōjo Comic suddenly asked her to create a new manga, and informed her that she had three days to produce a full-color ad page promoting the series. The author, intrigued by the planet Mars, elected to create a story about a Martian child raised on Earth who returns to Mars. To create the Martian landscapes, Hagio used photographs taken by NASA during the Viking 1 Mars exploration mission as reference material.

The first chapter of the series was published in Shūkan Shōjo Comic on May 28, 1978. Because of its rapid production schedule, the series began publication before Hagio had planned its ending; this is why the character of Yodaka, who gives birth to Sei, changes sex from male to female over the course of the story. The final chapter of the series was published on February 5, 1979.

== Reception ==
In 1980, Star Red was awarded Best Comic at the Seiun Awards.
