= Marginal (manga) =

Japanese manga series

- Cover of the first volume of Marginal as published by Shogakukan

マージナル (Maajinaru)
- Genre: Science fiction
- Manga
- Written by: Moto Hagio
- Published by: Shogakukan
- Magazine: Petit Flower
- Original run: 1985 – 1987
- Volumes: 5

Marginal (Japanese: マージナル, Hepburn: Maajinaru) is a Japanese science fiction manga written and illustrated by Moto Hagio, and serialized in Petit Flower between 1985 and 1987. It is a gender-reversed take on science fiction stories that Hagio had read where women disappeared, leaving an all-male world.

== Plot ==
The Earth has suffered a biological disaster, and by the year 2999, the Earth has become a wasteland. There is only one woman on the planet, revered as "Mother", who gives birth to all the boys of Earth and is herself reborn like a phoenix. Before the beginning of the story, the number of children from Mother has been decreasing, leading to anxiety among the men. At the beginning of the story, Mother is assassinated by a cult. The setting of the world has been described as "strongly reminiscent of Arab culture", "with horses and camels, swords and arrows, the world feels more medieval than futuristic." The men of Earth only live to about 30 years old due to "defective genetic traits" It is later discovered that Earth is an experiment run by humans who live on Mars, who have men and women, and that Mother is also a man who has his mind controlled and has had organ transplants. Mother is a ruse by the experimenters to camouflage the true source of the boys, they are genetically engineered on Mars.

== Characters ==
- Kira (キラ) – an "eccentric" youth, who is discovered to be a genetically engineered hermaphrodite with extreme empathy, suitable for becoming the next Mother. He is referred to as a 'lost child,' by many in this world, and so he seems to be. He rarely speaks at first except to murmur broken historical facts of the past Earth, which are of course unfamiliar to the dwellers of Marginal. The boy refers to himself in the first person as 'Kira,' and is later found to be one of four identical hermaphrodites. The Marginal dwellers assume he is only a boy though.
- Grinja (グリンジャ) – the cultist who killed Mother. Though brutal when necessary, he's kind and gentle and regrets the killings he chose to do. He rescues the mysterious boy Kira and only sells him because he fears that Kira will share his punishment for murdering the Mother. Even so, he stays with him and the boy's new owner, Ashijin. He and Ashijin become friends and comrades, but not for long. His tribe wear blue tattoos in the corner of their eyes. Rachel Thorn describes Grinja as a 'straight man' to Kira's eccentric, and feels Grinja represents "death and grim resignation".
- Ashijin (アシジン) – A brash, confident, mysterious man, a lone dweller of the Moon Caves. Grinja originally sells the boy Kira to him for one sand cow. Later, the two rescue the boy from bandits and come to dwell together in the Moon Cave for a number of days. Ashijin is a loner, but a proud, self-assured one, obsessed with his own supposed immortality. Despite his courtesy and easy goodwill, this supposed 'cursed man' has a dark side. His jealousy drives him to self-righteous cruelty and violent temper toward those who betray him. Rachel Thorn feels that Ashijin is a 'straight man' to Kira's eccentric, Ashijin representing "life and hope". Ebihara describes him as "the only optimistic relief" in the series.
- Meyard (メイヤード) – an employee of the Company that oversees Earth. Has a "cursed gene" and is forbidden to reproduce, and takes medicine to suppress this gene that has made his body feminine. According to Ebihara, Meyard is not as repellant to Hagio as his analogue in Star Red, Paveman, is.
- Ivan (イワン) – a "scientific genius from Mars" who created Kira. He is a genius but highly unstable. Ebihara describes him as an "adult child". When he was young, his father left his mother for another woman, then tried to return to Ivan's mother. She refused, and then Ivan's father knocked her unconscious and raped her. She committed suicide "half a year later". When grown, Ivan wanted to create "happy children", by giving them powerful empathic abilities – Kira is the result of this wish.

== Media ==
=== Manga ===
Serialized in Petit Flower between August 1985 and October 1987, Marginal was collected and released by Shogakukan as a series of five volumes from July 20, 1986, to November 20, 1987. Marginal was reprinted twice in 1994 and 1999 in three-volume editions.

No.	Release date	ISBN
1	July 20, 1986	4-09-178041-5
2	February 20, 1987	4-09-178042-3
3	April 20, 1987	4-09-178043-1
4	October 20, 1987	4-09-178044-X
5	November 20, 1987	4-09-178045-8

=== Audio drama ===
Marginal was adapted into a radio drama.

=== Stage production ===
In 2008, Marginal was staged by Studio Life, an all-male theatre troupe which had previously staged Hagio's The Heart of Thomas twice.

== Reception ==
Rachel Thorn has described the manga as "simply the best shojo sci-fi manga ever". Midori Matsui regards Marginal as a negative The Heart of Thomas, which deconstructs the logocentrism and idealism Matsui detects in that work.
