= Red Blinds the Foolish =

Japanese manga

- Cover of Deux Press's English release of Red Blinds the Foolish

愚か者は赤を嫌う (Oroka-mono wa Aka o Kirau)
- Genre: Yaoi
- Manga
- Written by: est em
- Published by: Ohzora Publishing
- English publisher: NA: Aurora Publishing
- Magazine: Mellow Mellow
- Published: January 31, 2008
- Volumes: 1

Red Blinds the Foolish (愚か者は赤を嫌う, Oroka-mono wa Aka o Kirau) is a Japanese yaoi manga written and illustrated by est em. Initially serialized in Mellow Mellow, the individual chapters were published in a single tankōbon volume by Ohzora Publishing in January 2008. The volume also includes some one-shots, including "Baby, stamp your foot" and "Tempos extra", that were originally published in the gay men's manga magazine Gekidan.

It is licensed for an English release in North America by Deux Press which published the single volume in December 2008, with English translation by manga scholar Rachel Matt Thorn. The "Best and Worst Manga of 2008-09" panel at Comic-Con 2009 nominated Red Blinds the Foolish as "best adult manga" of the year's offerings.

== Plot ==
Red Blinds the Foolish

A matador, Rafita, and Mauro, the butcher who disposes of the bulls' carcasses, have sex and then fall in love, leading to Rafita losing his concentration in the ring.

Corpse of the Round Table

A prequel to Red Blinds the Foolish, tells how Mauro became a butcher.

Baby, Stamp Your Foot

A shoemaker discovers a pair of high heels in his lover's closet, and figures out how to bring back the spice to their relationship.

Tiempos extra

The brother of a soccer player and a security guard at the soccer field fall in love.

Lumiere

A dying man reminisces about a failed relationship between a dancer and his instructor.

== Reception ==
Debi Aoki from About.com describes Red Blinds the Foolish as "Carefully researched and drawn with the depth of style and content that readers have come to expect from est em." Andrew Wheeler says, "I have to admit that yaoi is very far down on the list of things I'd typically read, but Est Em has a scratchy, exceptionally expressive line and a feeling for real characters and settings". Comic Book Resources says, "There is an intensity and realism to her work and the men she creates always feel like real men, experiencing love, lust, and friendship." The Comic Reporter notes est em's "richly drawn characters and angular, unconventionally attractive art." Slightly Biased Manga calls it "stylish" but finds it "hard-pressed to call it great." The Journal of Lincoln Heights Library Society says that they "just have a hard time with it."
