= Est Em =

Japanese manga artist

- えすとえむ
- Born: Maki Satoh; Tokyo, Japan
- Occupation: Manga artist
- Known for: Yaoi
- Website: est em's official site est em's blog

Maki Satoh (佐藤まき, Satō Maki), known by the pen name Est Em (えすとえむ, Esu to Emu; "S and M", stylized as est em), is a Japanese manga artist.

== Career ==
She made her debut as a professional manga artist with three yaoi collections after being scouted in art school. She was a student of Rachel Thorn, who provided translations for some of the English licenses of her work. Her work has been praised as having unusual maturity and depth, both for yaoi and for manga in general. She is currently working on non-yaoi manga.

Two of her first manga have been released in English by Aurora Publishing, which was a direct subsidiary of the Japanese publishing company Ohzora Shuppan, the original publishers of one of the works in question. A third has been licensed by Net Comics. In addition, her work Tableau Numbero 20, has been released by the Viz Media imprint Sublime.

== Bibliography ==
- Seduce Me After the Show (ショーが跳ねたら逢いましょう, Show ga Hanetara Aimashou), 2006, published by Tokyou Mangasha

Licensed in English as Seduce Me After the Show by Deux Press and subsequently by Digital Manga (Digital Manga Guild)

- Tableau No. 20, 2007–2009, published by Be x Boy Gold
- Age Called Blue (エイジ・コールド・ブルー, Eiji Koorudo Buruu), 2008, published by Tokyou Mangasha

Licensed in English as Age Called Blue by Net Comics

- Red Blinds the Foolish (愚か者は赤を嫌う, Oroka-mono wa Aka o Kirau), 2008, published by Ohzora Shuppan

Licensed in English as Red Blinds the Foolish by Deux Press

- Kinein! (キネイン!), 2008, published by Tokyo Mangasha

Licensed in English by Digital Manga (Digital Manga Guild)

- Ultras, 2008, published by Tokyo Mangasha

Licensed in English by Digital Manga (Digital Manga Guild)

- Working Kentauros! (はたらけ、ケンタウロス!, Hatarake, Kentauros!), 2010–2011, published by Kurofune Zero
- Equus, 2010–2011
- Golondrina (ゴロンドリーナ, Gorondorīna), 2011–2014, published by Shogakukan
- Ii ne! Hikaru Genji-kun (いいね!光源氏くん), 2015–2021, published by Shodensha in Feel Young
- City Hunter Gaiden: Hayato Ijuin Shi no Heion Naranu Nichijô (シティーハンター外伝 伊集院隼人氏の平穏ならぬ日常), 2018–2021, published by Coamix in Comic Tatan
