= List of Xenosaga media =

This is a list of media for the Xenosaga series owned by Namco Bandai.

== Video games ==
=== Main series ===
Title	Original release date(s)	Platform(s)	Sales figure(s)
Xenosaga Episode I: Der Wille zur Macht	JP: February 28, 2002; NA: February 25, 2003	PlayStation 2	439,778 copies in Japan
Xenosaga Episode II: Jenseits von Gut und Böse	JP: June 24, 2004; NA: February 15, 2005; PAL: October 28, 2005	PlayStation 2	256,417 copies in Japan
Xenosaga Episode III: Also sprach Zarathustra	JP: July 6, 2006; NA: August 29, 2006	PlayStation 2	343,000 copies worldwide (as of December 2006)

=== Spin-offs ===
Title	Original release date(s)	Platform(s)
Xenosaga Pied Piper Prequel set one hundred years prior to the start of Episode I.	JP: July 14, 2004	Mobile phones
Xenosaga Freaks A collection of interactive content, encyclopedia and minigames.	JP: April 28, 2004	PlayStation 2
Xenosaga I & II A 2D remake of Episode I and II.	JP: March 30, 2006	Nintendo DS

== Animation ==
Title	Original release date(s)	Format(s)
Xenosaga: The Animation 12-episode anime adaption of Episode I produced by Toei Animation.	JP: January 5, 2005 – March 23, 2005; NA: Unknown	JP: Television (TV Asahi); NA: Unknown

== Albums and singles ==
Title	Original release date(s)	Catalog number(s) and publisher(s)	Charts position(s)
Kokoro Single featuring the songs "Pain" and "Kokoro" from Episode I, performed by Joanne Hogg.	JP: February 6, 2002	SSCX-10061 (DigiCube)	61 (Oricon)
Xenosaga Original Soundtrack Soundtrack of Episode I, composed by Yasunori Mitsuda.	JP: March 6, 2002	SSCX-10062 (DigiCube)	38 (Oricon)
Xenosaga Freaks Reservation Privilege CD 4-track album featuring the Shion, KOS-MOS, and M.O.M.O. voice actresses.	JP: April 28, 2004	ZSF-01 (Namco)	–
Xenosaga Episode I Reprint of the Xenosaga Original Soundtrack, with two bonus tracks.	JP: May 19, 2004	SBPS-0004/5 (Sleigh Bells)	–
Xenosaga II: Jenseits Von Gut und Böse Movie Scene Soundtrack Soundtrack of Yuki Kajiura's compositions for Episode II.	JP: July 7, 2004	VICL-61431/2 (Victor Entertainment)	46 (Oricon)
Xenosaga Episode II: Jenseits von Gut und Böse Soundtrack Selection of Kajiura tracks from Episode II, offered as a bonus item for buying the Brady Games guide of the game.	NA: February 17, 2005	n/a (Namco / Brady Games)	–
Xenosaga: The Animation Soundtrack of the anime, composed by Kosuke Yamashita	JP: Mar 23, 2005	COCX-33116 (Columbia Records)	–
Xenosaga III: Also Sprach Zarathustra Original Sound Best Tracks Selection of Kajiura tracks from Episode III.	JP: July 12, 2006	VICL-61975/6 (Victor Entertainment)	–

== Printed media ==
=== Japanese ===
Title	Original release date(s)	ISBN(s) and publisher(s)
Xenosaga Episode I: Chikara Heno Ishi Official Settei Shiryou Shuu	JP: October 1, 2002	978-4757711648 (Enterbrain)
Xenosaga Episode I: Chikara Heno Ishi Scenario Book	JP: April 30, 2004	978-4757713253 (Enterbrain)
Xenosaga Episode II: Tsū Zen'aku no Higan Koushiki Complete Guide	JP: July 27, 2004	978-4902372038 (Namco)
Xenosaga Episode II: Tsū Zen'aku no Higan Scenario Book	JP: December 19, 2004	978-4757721197 (Enterbrain)
Xenosaga Episode II: Tsū Zen'aku no Higan Visual Comic Anthology	JP: Unknown	978-4776790754 (Ohzora Publishing)
Xenosaga the Animation Premium Art Collection	JP: Unknown	978-4861271489 (Mag Garden)

=== English ===
Title	Original release date(s)	ISBN(s) and publisher(s)
The Art of Episode I: Der Wille zur Macht Limited-edition Art book for Episode I.	2001	(BradyGames)
Xenosaga Episode I: Der Wille zur Macht Official Strategy Guide Strategy guide for Episode I.	February 21, 2003	978-0744002393 (BradyGames)
Xenosaga Episode II: Jenseits von Gut und Böse Official Strategy Guide Strategy guide for Episode II, sold with the soundtrack of the game as a bonus item.	February 9, 2005	978-0744004694 (BradyGames)
Xenosaga Episode III: Also Sprach Zarathustra Official Strategy Guide Strategy guide for Episode III.	August 23, 2006	978-0744008302 (BradyGames)
The Art of Xenosaga Episode III: Also sprach Zarathustra Limited-edition art book for Episode III.	2006	(BradyGames)

== Other media ==
Title	Original release date(s)	Publisher(s)
Xenosaga Episode I Limited Edition Movie DVD	JP: Unknown	
Xenosaga Alle spezielle DVD	JP: Unknown	
A Missing Year Web series set between Episode II and III.	JP: Unknown	Monolith Soft
