= Age Called Blue =

Japanese manga

- Cover of Age Called Blue

エイジ・コールド・ブルー (Eiji Koorudo Buruu)
- Genre: Yaoi
- Manga
- Written by: est em
- Published by: Tokyo Mangasha
- English publisher: NA: Net Comics
- Published: 2008
- Volumes: 1

Age Called Blue (Japanese: エイジ・コールド・ブルー, Hepburn: Eiji Koorudo Buruu) is a yaoi manga written and illustrated by est em. It was published by Tokyo Mangasha on January 17, 2008, in Japan. The first three chapters of Age Called Blue were published on the internet by Netcomics prior to the release of the paperback edition.

== Reception ==
A poll hosted by Deb Aoki of About.com picked Age Called Blue as its fifteenth most popular yaoi series of 2008, it came second in the following year. Melinda Beasi felt that "nothing comes easy" in Age Called Blue, feeling that this was a strength of the manga, and enjoyed the storytelling which did not include fanservice for fanservice's sake. She felt the translation of Age Called Blue was not as good as Rachel Thorn's translations of est em's other works. Kinukitty of The Comics Journal praised est em's tale, saying "The relationships feel very real, even if the settings are not strictly plausible." David Welsh has called est em's character designs "distinctively real", and praised her characterisations. Sandra Scholes praised the character artwork, and noted that their personalities came through in their speech patterns.

== See also ==
- Seduce Me After the Show, which has a short story featuring Billy, Nick, Pete and Joe.
