= Make Love & Peace =

Japanese manga series

ラブにピース (Rabu ni Pīsu)
- Genre: Romance
- Manga
- Written by: Takane Yonetani
- Published by: Ohzora Shuppan
- English publisher: Aurora Publishing
- Magazine: Ren-ai Hakusho Pastel
- Published: April 17, 2006
- Volumes: 1
- Manga

Make More Love & Peace
- Written by: Takane Yonetani
- Published by: Ohzora Shuppan
- English publisher: Aurora Publishing
- Magazine: Ren-ai Hakusho Pastel
- Published: June 16, 2007
- Volumes: 1

Make Love & Peace (ラブにピース, Rabu ni Pīsu) is a Japanese manga series written and illustrated by Takane Yonetani. It was serialized in Ren-ai Hakusho Pastel, and its individual chapters published in tankōbon volumes by Ohzora Shuppan. In the story Ayame, a university student, falls in love with Koichi, a police officer. The two fall in love and engage in sexual intercourse. Koichi's unpredictable job complicates the relationship.

It is licensed for English language release in North American release by Aurora Publishing under their "Luv Luv Press" imprint. A sequel, Make More Love & Peace, was also released and features a shoplifter wanting to have sex with Koichi.

PopCultureShock described the characters as "warm", but described the plot as "mundane romance". Johanna Draper Carlson of Comics Worth Reading says that the many sex scenes in Make Love & Peace become almost numbing. Jason Thompson praises the characters' "almost normal relationship".
