= I Shall Never Return =

Manga series

- English cover of I Shall Never Return volume 1

ぼくはこのまま帰らない (Boku wa Konomama Kaeranai)
- Genre: Yaoi
- Manga
- Written by: Kazuna Uchida
- Published by: Shufu-to-Seikatsu Sha, Ohzora Publishing
- English publisher: NA: Aurora Publishing
- Original run: October 1992 – September 1996
- Volumes: 5
- Original video animation
- Directed by: Katsumi Minokuchi
- Studio: J.C.Staff
- Licensed by: NA: AnimeWorks
- Released: June 21, 1994
- Runtime: 40 minutes

I Shall Never Return (Japanese: ぼくはこのまま帰らない, Hepburn: Boku wa Konomama Kaeranai) is a yaoi manga series by Kazuna Uchida. The first volume was published in Japan in October 1992 by Shufu-to-Seikatsu Sha. It spanned six volumes until its conclusion in September 1996. Ohzora Publishing reprinted the volumes from April 1997 through October 1997. Aurora Publishing licensed the series for an English language release in North America in 2007. I Shall Never Return is available in English on the Internet from the Netcomics publisher.

The plot is about a love triangle between a cheerful young man, Ritsuro, his troubled friend Ken who works as a rent boy, and Ritsuro's girlfriend Moeko.

I Shall Never Return was adapted into a 40-minute original video animation by J.C.Staff and released in Japan on January 27, 2006. Media Blasters licensed the OVA for distribution in North America and releasing it on February 13, 2007.

== Story ==
A delinquent teenager with divorced parents named Ken Amafuji longs to tell his best friend Ritsurou Yoshinari, how he really feels. In the way of that admission is Ritsurou's girlfriend, Moeko. One day, he decides to drop out of high school and gets Ritsurou to live with him. The story begins when Ken has a one-night stand with Moeko so he can get closer to Ritsurou.

== Characters ==
- Ritsurou Yoshinari (吉成 律亮, Yoshinari Ritsurou) Voiced by: Kazuya Ichijou

Ritsurou is a sophomore in high school and one of the main protagonists of the series who is somewhat involved in a love triangle between his longtime girlfriend/classmate Moeko and his best friend Ken-(who harbors romantic feelings for him) who he has known since middle school. At first, he was constantly annoyed and stressed from Ken's delinquency and laziness and was often confused about how Ken really feels about him; once he fully understands Ken's feelings and the hardships that he was forced to endure, he declares his feelings to him and two engage in passionate lovemaking. Before he moved out to live with Ken, he lived with his mother and younger sister Nami-(who attends middle school); he works as both a clerk at a local convenience store and a waiter at an Italian restaurant-(despite the fact that teenagers in Japan are not allowed to get jobs, unless they get special permission from their parents or school).

- Ken Amafuji (海部フジ ケン, Amafuji Ken) Voiced by: Kouichi Toochika

Ken is Ritsurou's best friend who secretly worked in the escort business until he gave it up so that he can get involved in a more normal and healthier dating relationship. His parents divorced when he was thirteen after his father had an affair with another woman-(his father's whereabouts are unknown while his absent mother is living in Singapore and has gotten remarried) which affected him greatly and now lives on his own in an apartment until he got Ritsurou to move in with him as his roommate-(later his lover). After he nearly attempted to seduce Ritsurou, who then lashed out at him for his carelessness as well as his affair with Moeko-(for the second time), he angrily tells his friend to go home and be with Moeko who then complies and leaves. After a brief moment and contemplation, Ritsurou not wanting to lose the person that he cares about-(Ken) runs back to Ken's apartment and admits his true feelings for him; which results in the boys making out and having sex in Ken's bedroom.

- Moeko Kohashi (小橋 萌子, Kohashi Moeko) Voiced by: Yuko Nagashima

Moeko is Ritsurou's longtime girlfriend who had cheated on him with his best friend Ken as well as having sex with him. Despite her past mistakes, she still loves and cares about Ritsurou; when she learns about Ritsurou and Ken's homosexual relationship after catching the boys kissing under some cherry blossom trees-(in the manga she saw them kissing in a hospital room when Ken got assaulted by a former client), she becomes distraught and retaliates by cutting her hair short and to show Ritsurou the emotional pain and suffering that she had to go through. After her break up with Ritsurou, there's an assumption that she has developed a crush for her school teacher Hiroto.

- Kazuyoshi Iwasaki (岩崎 和義, Iwasaki Kazuyoshi) Voiced by: Kazunari Tanaka

A classmate of Ritsurou and Moeko. He's had some history with Ken as the two of them where close friends before he dropped out of high school

- Hiroto Yumioka (ヒロト ゆみおか, Yumioka Hiroto)

Hiroto is a handsome 28 year-old history and homeroom teacher at the high school that Ritsurou, Ken-(formerly until he dropped out), and Moeko attend.

- Nami Yoshinari (吉成 ナミ, Yoshinari Nami)

Nami is a middle school student and Ritsurou's younger sister.

- Michiru Kubota (クボタ ミチル, Kubota Michiru)

Michiru is a friend and classmate of Moeko's from school.

== Reception ==
Moeko has been described as "more than a convenient prop" to the plot, which is unusual for female characters in BL works, which is unusual since her character is important to the overall character development of both male characters. Ritsuro and Ken's switching seme and uke roles has been remarked on as interesting in "a work of this vintage", and as a device showing the confused emotions of their relationship. Rape scenes in the second volume have been described as being for "full emotional, not sensual, impact". Erin F. of PopCultureShock described it as "amazingly dramatic". The OVA has been described as a "love letter" to the fans of the manga, and as a 'snapshot' of the manga story.
