= Heavenly Body =

Heavenly Body may refer to:

- Heavenly Body (manga), by Takashi Kanzaki, 2008
- Heavenly Body (film), a 2011 Italian drama
- The Heavenly Body, a 1944 American romantic comedy film
- "Heavenly Body", a song by Kylie Minogue from her 2023 album Tension

== See also ==
- Astronomical object, or heavenly body
- Heavenly Bodies (disambiguation)
