= Spring Fever (manga) =

Japanese manga anthology

- Cover of English edition

水温む (Mizu Nurumu)
- Genre: Yaoi
- Manga
- Written by: Yugi Yamada
- Published by: Ohzora Publishing, Houbunsha
- English publisher: NA: Aurora Publishing
- Published: May 2001

Spring Fever (Japanese: 水温む, Hepburn: Mizu Nurumu) is a Japanese manga anthology written and illustrated by Yugi Yamada and published by Ohzora Publishing in 1995 and Houbunsha in May 2001. It was released in English by Aurora Publishing in August 2007 under their label Deux Press. Spring Fever tells the romantic homosexual story of Yusuke Onishi, who falls in love with the much older single father, Takami Hirokazu. Wildman Blues tells the story of Naoki, who came out in high school, and his best friend Ayu who vowed to help him. Naoki drove him away by "forcing himself" on Ayu, and they meet again when adults and have sex.

== Reception ==
Briana Lawrence, writing for Mania Entertainment, noted the storytelling technique of minimising past sexual history in flashbacks, as the story is about the current relationship, not the past one. Lawrence did not enjoy Spring Fever as much as she had Yamada's other works, feeling that there was "too much" going on in "such a short amount of time", feeling that the title story could be expanded to a lengthy series like Shout Out Loud!. She disliked the "very irresponsible" Takami, and felt that the quick resolution to the problem between Masaaki and Takami was unrealistic, given the extremes Masaaki went to. Conversely, Lawrence "loved [Wildman Blues] to death", enjoying how Naoki's story dealt with having a homosexual identity and enjoying seeing how their relationship progressed through school and after school. Lawrence found it "painful to read" the scene when Naoki "forces himself" on Ayu, trying to drive Ayu away, and rejoiced when Ayu refused to let Naoki push him away later in the book. Erin F., writing for PopCultureShock, also enjoyed Wildman Blues more than Spring Fever, feeling that although Yamada competently portrayed Yuuske "as a young man who would fall in love with anyone at the drop of a hat", that the story was overly melodramatic. David Welsh described Yuuske as "a big, adorable dork", finding Takami "less interesting" as a character, although he felt it served as a happy ending sequel to coercive yaoi series in general.

== See also ==
- Glass Sky and Laugh Under the Sun - other works by Yugi Yamada featuring Naoki
