= Nephilim (disambiguation) =

In the Bible, nephilim are offspring of "Sons of God" and "daughters of men".

Nephilim may also refer to:

== Books ==
- Nephilim (manga), a josei manga by Anna Hanamaki
- Nephilim (manhwa), a manhwa by Ryu Kum-chel
- Nephilim, a race of angel-human hybrids that hunt demons in The Mortal Instruments by Cassandra Clare
- Nephilim, a 2013 Swedish novel by Asa Schwarz, translated by Steven T. Murray

== Film and TV ==
- Ha'Nephilim, an Israeli television show that involves supernatural beings called Nephilim

== Games ==
- Nephilim (roleplaying game), a 1992 role-playing game by French company Multisim (later Chaosium)
- Nephilim (Xenosaga), a character in the Xenosaga series
- Nephilim (Wing Commander), codename given to an unknown race of squid-like aliens in the video game Wing Commander: Prophecy
- Nephilim (Avernum), or Nephils, a race of feline humanoids in the computer role-playing game series Exile and Avernum
- Nephilim, an extinct race, product of relationships held between fallen angels and humans in Tomb Raider: The Angel of Darkness videogame
- Nephilim, a creature type in the Guildpact expansion for the Magic: The Gathering trading-card game

== Music ==
- The Nefilim, a gothic metal band formed as a successor to Fields of the Nephilim

=== Albums ===
- The Nephilim (album), an album by Fields of the Nephilim
- Nephilim: Act of God 1, an album by Stu Dent

=== Songs ===
- "Nephilim", a song by Katatonia from Night Is the New Day 2009
- "The Nephilim", a song by AFI from The Art of Drowning 2000

== See also ==
- Nephilim in popular culture
