= Pretty Poison =

Pretty Poison may refer to:

- "Pretty Poison" (Batman: The Animated Series), a 1992 television episode
- Pretty Poison (EP), by Nessa Barrett, 2021
- Pretty Poison (film), a 1968 American film
- Pretty Poison (group), an American dance group
- Pretty Poison (manga), by Yutta Narukami, 2006
