= Kiss All the Boys =

Japanese manga series

- Cover of the first volume, English edition.

できのいいキス悪いキス (Deki no Ii Kiss Warui Kiss)
- Genre: Yaoi
- Manga
- Written by: Shiuko Kano
- Published by: Ohzora Publishing, Futabasha
- English publisher: NA: Aurora Publishing
- Original run: August 1997 – October 1998
- Volumes: 3

Kiss All the Boys (できのいいキス悪いキス, Deki no Ii Kiss Warui Kiss) is a yaoi comedy manga by Shiuko Kano published by Ohzora Publishing and later by Futabasha. It was licensed in English by Aurora Publishing under their Deux Press imprint and released between March 2008 and October 2008. It has been published in Chinese by Tong Li Publishing. Kiss All the Boys is about a hentai author whose gay teenage son comes to live with him, and the author's discovery of his own homosexuality.

== Reception ==
Danielle Van Gorder, writing for Mania Entertainment about the first volume, was concerned that the book might feature incest due to the back cover description and was relieved that there was none. Van Gorder found Kiss All the Boys to be "genuinely funny", and praised the "well-realized characters" and complex relationships.

Johanna Draper Carlson enjoyed that the first volume's sense of humor extended to its own genre, and found it especially funny that the characters "cut to the chase" when it came to sex. For Isaac Hale, the back cover descriptions of the second and third volumes left him "snickering", and gave him the expectation that Kiss All the Boys would be "pure garbage", as he had negative impressions of Kano's Affair.

Although all the male characters of Kiss All the Boys are gay, a common trope in yaoi manga, Hale described them as being "deeply flawed", including the main character, which Hale found lent a welcome unpredictability to the story.

He found the powerplay in the relationship between the high school boy and teacher to be "extremely uncomfortable", but appreciated that the series "acknowledges the inappropriateness" of this relationship. Katherine Farmar, writing for Comics Village, felt upon reading the final volume that the problems of the "soap opera" series were resolved too quickly and unrealistically, especially in regards to the high school boy-adult relationship, as although the adult's son reacts badly to the relationship, another adult character reconciles the matter too quickly.
