= Hate to Love You =

Japanese manga

- English cover of Hate to Love You

キライ嫌いも (Kirai Kiraimo)
- Genre: Yaoi
- Manga
- Written by: Makoto Tateno
- Published by: Ohzora Publishing
- English publisher: NA: Aurora Publishing
- Published: September 2001

Hate to Love You (Japanese: キライ嫌いも, Hepburn: Kirai Kiraimo) is a yaoi manga by Makoto Tateno and published by Ohzora Publishing. It has been published in English by Aurora Publishing and in German by Egmont Manga & Anime.

== Reception ==
Adrienne Hess found both male characters in Hate to Love You stereotypical, but enjoyed the portrayal of Akiko, a "female love interest" of Yuma, as the couple's "cupid". She found the second story to be "slightly disturbing". Hess praised the artwork, especially the expressive faces. Katja Bürk, writing for animePRO, describes the manga as "Strong feelings can change and so there can easily be love from hate, or vice versa." Brigid Alverson feels that there is little similarity to Romeo and Juliet despite the feud between the families, and found Akiko, who unites the two families to be the "most likable" character. Alverson found the other story in the volume "rather creepy". Alverson found Tateno's art 'rather flat' yet 'dynamic' in places.
