= Walkin' Butterfly =

Japanese manga series

- Cover of Walkin' Butterfly volume 1 published by Aurora

ウォーキン・バタフライ
- Genre: Drama
- Manga
- Written by: Chihiro Tamaki
- Published by: Kodansha; Kadokawa X Media; Ohzora Publishing
- English publisher: NA: Aurora Publishing
- Magazine: Vanilla
- Original run: 2003 – 2007
- Volumes: 4
- Television drama

Walkin'☆Butterfly
- Directed by: Kensaku Miyashita
- Written by: Uiko Miura
- Original network: TV Tokyo
- Original run: 11 July 2008 – 26 September 2008
- Episodes: 12

Walkin' Butterfly is a josei manga by Chihiro Tamaki. It was serialized by Kodansha in the manga magazine Vanilla until the magazine ceased publication in 2003, then by Kadokawa X Media by mobile phone until the series concluded in 2007. The series was collected in four bound volumes by Ohzora Publishing. The manga is licensed in North America by Aurora Publishing. The series was adapted as a live-action drama broadcast on TV Tokyo from 11 July to 26 September 2008. It depicts a young woman's struggles to overcome her insecurity about her height by becoming a model.

== Plot ==
Walkin' Butterfly follows the character of Michiko, a young woman with above average height for a Japanese woman. Because of this and her job as a pizza delivery person, Michiko is filled with insecurities and doubts. During a delivery at a fashion show Michiko is mistaken for a model and forced out onto the runway. Because of this Michiko ends up becoming entangled in the world of modeling and noticed by a fashion designer who tells her that until she truly sees herself, she will never be a true model.

== Characters ==
Michiko Torayasu (寅安ミチコ, Torayasu Michiko) Portrayed by: Aoi Nakabeppu
A young woman who is very insecure about her outward appearance due to her unusual height (180 cm). However, a brief encounter with the fashion industry leaves Michiko yearning for a place on the long-legged catwalk and a way to find herself as a woman. In the live-action drama, she was portrayed by real-life model Aoi Nakabeppu.
Kou Mihara (三原 航, Mihara Kō) Portrayed by: Jun Toba
The fashion designer whose show Michiko stumbles into when she is mistaken as one of his models. However, unlike the others, Mihara was able to see the ugly insecurities lurking within her and tells her that she can never become a model as she is. He is stubborn and principled, and eventually refuses an offer with a top fashion company because it would require him to compromise his vision.
Kenichirou Nishikino (錦野 健一郎, Nishikino Kenichirō) Portrayed by: Eiki Kitamura
A former upper-classman of Michiko's she admired, and also her first love. Manly and kind, he is everything she dreams of in a boyfriend, but unfortunately he only thinks of her as a little sister.
Ryo Tago (多湖 涼, Tago Ryō) Portrayed by: Maho Toyota
Michiko's agent. She was once a top model, but now the temperamental, alcoholic president of what appears to be a failing modeling agency. Despite her cynicism, she decides to give Michiko a chance as a model. Michiko frequently calls her "Old Bat." Early in volume three, Tago is hospitalized with alcohol poisoning, saying she's quitting the industry entirely, which renews Michiko's determination to becoming a model.
Isao Samejima (鮫島 いさお, Samejima Isao) Portrayed by: Yasuto Kosuda
Director/Producer. A somewhat mysterious character that shows interest in Michiko. He was also the one that introduces her to Ryo Tago.

== Development ==
According to Chihiro Tamaki in an interview printed in the North American edition of volume one, the story came about because she had an editor who liked to look at models, but she thought that a story just about the fashion industry as a business would be boring: "So the first thing I did was to decide upon a girl as a protagonist who would have average, ordinary characteristics—nothing outstanding, like celebrities who are known for extremely good or bad characteristics. I developed the story of the heroine Michiko overcoming her inferiority complex about being tall and rising to become a top model." The "butterfly" in the title is intended both to be a metaphor for a growing girl and to represent a beautiful model, while "walkin'" came from the images of a model walking down a modeling runway and of a struggling Michiko walking instead of flying. Tamaki stated that her intent with the story is not just depicting Michiko "growing up and becoming independent", but also to highlight Michiko's romances.

Tamaki claimed that, as a result of doing research for the series, her favorite model became Ai Tominaga, and that she was flattered when Tominaga wrote, in an endorsement for the first volume of the Japanese edition, that there were things she had in common with Michiko. Tamaki cited as specific influences Ashita no Joe for its plots and Rumiko Takahashi's Urusei Yatsura for its characters.

== Media ==
=== Manga ===
Walkin' Butterfly was written and illustrated by Chihiro Tamaki. It was originally serialized by Kodansha in the shōjo manga magazine Vanilla aimed at older teenage girls; after Vanilla ceased publication in 2003, Walkin' Butterfly was serialized by Kadokawa X Media by mobile phone as part of its Comics Walker service until the series concluded in 2007. Serial chapters were collected in four tankōbon volumes by Ohzora Publishing under the Ease Comics imprint. The manga is licensed in North America by Aurora Publishing, which marketed the series as a josei manga aimed at young adult women. The first three volumes were published in English between August 2007 and May 2008; volume four was originally scheduled for September 2008, but has been indefinitely delayed. Walkin' Butterfly is available in English on the Internet from the Netcomics publisher. It is also licensed in French by Asuka, in Polish by Taiga and in Italian by JPOP Edizioni.

No.	Original release date	Original ISBN	North America release date	North America ISBN
1	25 July 2005	4-7767-9221-4	August 2007	978-1-934496-00-8
2	24 November 2006	4-7767-9291-5	January 2008	978-1-934496-06-0
3	19 July 2007	978-4-7767-9369-4	May 2008	978-1-934496-18-3
4	December 2007	978-4-7767-9417-2	—	978-1-934496-30-5

=== Drama ===
The live-action drama, titled Walkin'☆Butterfly (ウォーキン☆バタフライ; in katakana instead of rōmaji like the manga), was broadcast in 12 episodes on TV Tokyo starting on 11 July 2008, and running until 26 September. It starred Aoi Nakabeppu as Michiko Torayasu and Jun Toba as Kou Mihara. The opening theme was "Seiippai, Bokura no Uta" by ghostnote and the ending theme was "Ima Fuku Kaze" by Hi Lockation Markets. Some of the actors appeared in the theatrical movie Flying☆Rabbits playing the same characters as in the drama and the Japanese store, Toudoukan was used as a filming location in 2008.

== Reception ==
Reviewers have called Walkin' Butterfly an entertaining but not original series. Anime News Network compared the story to a josei manga version of a shōnen tournament series aimed at boys, saying "nothing here about the plot or the characters is particularly believable or novel. Instead, it is comfortably formulaic; the pleasure of Walkin' Butterfly lies not so much in the discovery of what happens next but rather in how what happens next happens." Mania.com described the series as "not particularly realistic," but called it "an interesting balance of comedy and poignancy." The character of Michiko was cited by more than one reviewer as a key appeal of the series. Tamaki's art received mixed reviews, with several reviewers praising it, comparing the style to Moyoco Anno's and Yayoi Ogawa's, and others criticizing it as "standard" and sketchy. Reviewers criticized later volumes for allowing Michiko's mood swings to get tiresome, and for switching to a more "standard" storyline. The English edition was criticized as sometimes using awkward language and typography.

Walkin' Butterfly was voted the 2nd best new josei manga in English of 2007 by readers of About.com. The series was a finalist for YALSA's 2008 list of Great Graphic Novels for teens.
