= Future Lovers =

Future Lovers or Future Lover may refer to:

- "Future Lovers", a song from the Madonna album Confessions on a Dance Floor (2005)
- Future Lovers (manga), a manga series by Saika Kunieda
- "Future Lover", a song by Brunette
- "Future Lover (Mirai Koibito)", a song from the Miliyah Kato album Liberty
