= Sounds of Love =

Sounds of Love may refer to:

- Sounds of Love (album), a 1970 album by Bobby Vinton
- Sounds of Love (manga), a Japanese manga

== See also ==
- Sound of Love (disambiguation)
