= Otoko no Isshō =

Manga series by Keiko Nishi

娚の一生
- Genre: Slice of life, romance
- Manga
- Written by: Keiko Nishi
- Published by: Shogakukan
- Magazine: Flowers
- Original run: March 10, 2009 (Volume 1) – September 24, 2012 (Volume 4)
- Volumes: 4
- Live-action film
- Directed by: Ryūichi Hiroki
- Written by: Hiroshi Saitō
- Music by: Kōji Endō
- Released: October 2014 (Tokyo Film Festival); February 14, 2015

Otoko no Isshō (Japanese: 娚の一生; lit. "A Man's Lifetime") is a slice of life romance josei manga series written and illustrated by Keiko Nishi. It was published by Shogakukan on Flowers magazine and in four volumes compiling the chapters. A live action romantic drama film adaptation was released on February 14, 2015. It's directed by Ryūichi Hiroki and written by Hiroshi Saitō. It stars Nana Eikura and Etsushi Toyokawa.

== Cast ==
- Nana Eikura as Tsugumi Dozono
- Etsushi Toyokawa as Jun Kaieda
- Osamu Mukai as Toshio Nakagawa
- Sakura Andō as Saki Akimoto
- Tomoya Maeno as Satoshi Sonoda
- Motoki Ochiai as Takahiro Tomono
- Toshie Negishi as Kyoko
- Mari Hamada as Sayoko
- Yū Tokui as Tamio
- Hana Kino as Kayo Sakata
- Minami as a female receptionist
- Mayuko Iwasa as Harumi Tomioka
- Kentarō Sakaguchi as Nobuo

== Volumes ==
- 1 (March 10, 2009)
- 2 (October 10, 2009)
- 3 (March 10, 2010)
- 4 (September 24, 2012)

== Music ==
The soundtrack of the film is by Kōji Endō and the theme song is "Hold me, Hold you." by JUJU.

== Reception ==
Volume 3 of the manga reached the 17th place on the weekly Oricon manga chart and, as of March 14, 2010, has sold 37,260 copies; volume 4 reached the 3rd place and, as of October 7, 2012, has sold 166,735 copies.

The manga was nominated for the third Manga Taishō in 2010, ranking 5th out of the 10 nominees with 48 points.

In a review of the film, Maggie Lee of Variety said that "foot fetishists will rejoice, but this is an otherwise wholesome, mellow May–September romance."
