= Ruff Love =

Japanese manga

- Cover of the Japanese release

シバといっしょ。 (Shibato Issho.)
- Genre: Yaoi
- Manga
- Written by: Tamaki Kirishima
- Published by: Nihonbungeisha
- English publisher: NA: Aurora Publishing
- Magazine: Nichibun Comics
- Published: December 28, 2006
- Volumes: 1

Ruff Love (Japanese: シバといっしょ。, Hepburn: Shibato Issho.) is a one-shot Japanese manga written and illustrated by Tamaki Kirishima. The manga was serialized in Nihonbungeisha's manga magazine, Nichibun Comics. Nihonbungeisha released the manga's tankōbon volume on December 28, 2006. It is licensed in North America by Aurora Publishing, which released the manga through its yaoi imprint, Deux Press, on August 8, 2008. The manga is licensed in Taiwan by Ever Glory Publishing, which released the manga on October 5, 2007.

== Reception ==
Comics Village's Lissa Pattillo comments on the manga's art, saying, she "liked the sketchy look it had and I liked the anatomy during some sex scenes where it's shown that the characters actually have a little bit of realistic flesh on their frames. Shiba was pretty adorable, wide-eyed and scruffy. I don't have as much positive to say about Taketora, who not only suffered from some uneven anatomy but from a facial design that I just didn't find very visually appealing (big lips are too big)." Pop Culture Shock's Michelle Smith comments on the "few genuinely funny panels, like those in which Akatsuki (another dog-person who moves in with Taketora and Shiba) entertains himself by playing with a frog." Anime News Network's Casey Brienza criticises the book, saying, "nothing about this book manifests creative conviction—not the plot, not the characters, not even the furry fetish." Dru Pagliassotti, comparing romance novels with Boys Love manga, mentions Ruff Love as an example of a kemonomimi "society", or setting.
