= Laugh Under the Sun =

Japanese manga written and illustrated by Yugi Yamada

- Laugh Under the Sun as published by Digital Manga Publishing

太陽の下で笑え。 (Taiyō no Shita de Warae.)
- Genre: Yaoi
- Manga
- Written by: Yugi Yamada
- Published by: Houbunsha
- English publisher: NA: Digital Manga Publishing
- Published: January 1999
- Volumes: 1

Laugh Under the Sun (Japanese: 太陽の下で笑え。, Hepburn: Taiyō no Shita de Warae.) is a Japanese manga written and illustrated by Yugi Yamada. It is licensed in North America by Digital Manga Publishing, which released the manga through its June imprint, on December 19, 2007.

== Reception ==
Leroy Douresseaux, writing for Comic Book Bin, enjoyed the setting of the manga and found Sohei in particular to be an interesting character. Briana Lawrence, writing for Mania Entertainment, felt that Yamada's strength is "stories that deal with not just boy on boy love, but real life situations", and that the characters did not feel "two-dimensional". Lawrence enjoyed the varied flashback techniques, including the all-black panels with objects drawn in white for painful memories. Lawrence was concerned that although Sohei had always been portrayed as a heterosexual character, he did not "react more to falling for another man". Holly Ellingwood, writing for Active Anime, felt that the art had "a sense of roughness" to it sometimes, despite being generally "clean" and showing attention to detail in the backgrounds. Katherine Farmar, writing for Comic Village, found Yamada's artwork and character designs offputting at first, but grew to enjoy the story. Farmar found that although the couple took a while to get together, their reticence stemmed from their personalities, never feeling "irritatingly contrived". Shaenon Garrity, writing for Graphic Novel Review, described the manga as an example of modern series showing "more realistic gay characters in plausible modern settings", and later called it "nicely-observed, unusually realistic story about a group of bohemian twentysomethings putting their lives together."

== See also ==
- Glass Sky and Spring Fever - other manga by Yugi Yamada featuring Naoki.
