= Keiko Nishi =

Japanese manga artist (born 1966)

Keiko Nishi 西 炯子
- Born: December 26, 1966 (age 59) Ibusuki, Kagoshima, Japan
- Area: Manga artist
- Notable works: Sanban-chō Hagiwara-ya no Bijin; Love Song

Keiko Nishi (西 炯子, Nishi Keiko; born December 26, 1966, in Ibusuki, Kagoshima Prefecture, Japan) is a Japanese manga artist.

== Life ==
After graduating from Kagoshima Prefectural Ibusuki High School, she attended Tsuru University from where she graduated with a degree in Japanese literature. While still attending Tsuru University, Nishi made her professional manga debut in 1988 with the short story "Matteiru yo" in Shogakukan's manga magazine Petit Flower. After her debut, she stopped publishing manga and was working as an elementary school teacher. Eventually, she took up manga again because of financial reasons. Her definitive works include Sanban-chō Hagiwara-ya no Bijin and Love Song.

== Style ==
Nishi was inspired by manga artists Fusako Kuramochi and Yoshikazu Yasuhiko.

After completing a draft with pencil, she starts the inking process of her pages using a G pen also for thin lines. She then adds more detailed lines with a Maru pen.

== Legacy ==
Rachel Thorn described her in the mid-1990s as "one of the most popular and respected artists of her (twenty-something) generation." Her former assistants include Peppe.

Her manga series Otoko no Isshō was nomininated for the Manga Taishō in 2010 and, in the same year, was among the jury-selected works at the Japan Media Arts Festival. She herself has been in the festival's jury for manga from 2019 until 2021.

== Works ==
Cover of Love Song.

- Sanban-chō Hagiwara-ya no Bijin (三番町萩原屋の美人, 1991–2000)
- Love Song (October 1993, ISBN 4-09-172026-9, Shogakukan)
  - Love Song (1998-04-05, ISBN 1-56931-255-9, Viz Communications)
- STAY (2002-2006)
- Kyudo Boys (ひらひらひゅ〜ん, 2006–2010)
- Denpa no hito yo (2007)
- Nisan to Boku (2008-2011)
- Otoko no Isshō (2008–2012)
- Ane no Kekkon (姉の結婚, 2010–2014)
- Koi to Gunkan (恋と軍艦, 2011–2015)
- Otō-san, Chibi ga Inakunarimashita (お父さん、チビがいなくなりました, 2013–2015)
- Katsu Curry no Hi (カツカレーの日, 2014–2015)
- Shiro ga Ite (シロがいて, 2015–2018)
- Ta-tan (たーたん, 2015–2024)
- Hatsukoi no Sekai (初恋の世界, 2016–2024)
- Koi to Kokkai (恋と国会, 2018-hiatus)
- Sayonara Gohan (さよならごはん, 2024-present)
- Acchanchi (あっちゃんち, 2024-present)

=== Anthologies ===
- Four Shōjo Stories (February 1996, ISBN 1-56931-055-6, Viz Communications, two stories)

=== Short stories ===
- Promise (January 1994, Viz Flower Comics). Manga in a floppy comics format. The book contains two stories: Promise and Since You've Been Gone which were then included in the Four Shōjo Stories anthology. It's the first shojo manga ever legally published in the United States.
