= Golondrina (manga) =

Japanese manga series

- First tankōbon volume cover, featuring Chica

ゴロンドリーナ (Gorondorīna)
- Genre: Drama
- Manga
- Written by: Est Em
- Published by: Shogakukan
- Imprint: Ikki Comix
- Magazine: Monthly Ikki (June 25, 2011 – September 25, 2014)
- Original run: June 25, 2011 – December 26, 2014
- Volumes: 5
- icon

Golondrina (Japanese: ゴロンドリーナ, Hepburn: Gorondorīna; lit. 'Swallow') is a Japanese manga series written and illustrated by Est Em. It was serialized in Shogakukan's seinen manga magazine Monthly Ikki from June 2011 to September 2014, when the magazine ceased its publication, and the series finished with its fifth volume, released in December of that same year.

== Premise ==
The story is set in Spain and follows a young woman named Chica (チカ, Chika). After being betrayed by her lover, Maria (マリア), Chica resolves to commit suicide. One rainy night, while wandering hopelessly, Chica steps in front of a car driven by a man named Antonio (アントニオ). He manages to avoid hitting her and takes her to his home. The next morning, distraught that Antonio saved her life and wondering if Maria left her because she is a woman, Chica asks him if things would have been different if she were a man. Antonio, a former apoderado (bullfighting manager), replies that he would have suggested she become a matador. Chica resolves to become a bullfighter and die by a bull's horns.

Although hesitant, Antonio takes her to the Plaza de toros de la Real Maestranza in Seville to show her the dangers of bullfighting. There, she witnesses a bullfight in which a bull is killed. Rather than being discouraged, her desire to die and her determination to prove that a woman can become a matador are strengthened. She decides to begin training as a bullfighter under Antonio's instruction.

== Publication ==
Written and illustrated by Est Em, Golondrina was serialized in Shogakukan's seinen manga magazine Monthly Ikki from June 25, 2011, to September 25, 2014, when the magazine ceased its publication and it was announced that series would continue publication via collected tankōbon volumes. Shogakukan released the first volume on February 29, 2012. It was firstly announced that the series would end with six volumes; however, the fifth and last volume was released on December 26, 2014.

=== Volumes ===
No.	Japanese release date	Japanese ISBN
1	February 29, 2012	978-4-09-188575-3
2	October 30, 2012	978-4-09-188606-4
3	July 30, 2013	978-4-09-188627-9
4	February 28, 2014	978-4-09-188647-7
5	December 26, 2014	978-4-09-188673-6
