= Aoi Nakabeppu =

Japanese fashion model and actress (born 1990)

- 中別府 葵
- Born: September 13, 1990 (age 35); Kōshi, Kumamoto Prefecture, Japan
- Occupations: Fashion model, actress
- Years active: 2005–present
- Spouse: Akira Kagimoto (m. 2024)
- Children: 1

Aoi Nakabeppu (中別府 葵, Nakabeppu Aoi; born September 13, 1990, in Kōshi, Kumamoto Prefecture, Japan) is a Japanese fashion model and actress who is affiliated with Horipro.

== Biography ==
In 2005, Nakabeppu won the 30th Horipro Tarento Scout Caravan Quasi Grand Prix award, and debuted in the entertainment industry in the wake.

In 2006, she had been an exclusive model in the fashion magazine Mina.

In 2008, Nakabeppu was elected in the 2008 level of Toray Girl Swimsuit Campaign. At the time, she was belonged to Toray's women's volleyball team and met Saori Kimura and made friends.

On March 24, 2009, Nakabeppu graduated from Sunrise High School. She was synchronized with people such as Kie Kitano and Natsumi Kiyoura.

Nakabeppu also had a good relationship with Mitsuki Tanimura.

On April 1, 2009, she was enrolled to Meiji Gakuin University's Department of Sociology.

In April 2013, Nakabeppu became a member of Tokyo Girls Run's second graduating class.

On November 8, 2024, Nakabeppu announced her marriage with Akira Kagimoto from Lead. At the same time, she also announced her pregnancy of her first child. On March 15, 2025, she gave birth to her first child.

== Filmography ==
=== Television ===
| Year | Title | Role | Network | Notes |
|---|---|---|---|---|
| 2006 | My Boss My Hero | 3rd year class C student | NTV | Guest appearance |
| 2007 | Life | Chie Mamiya | Fuji TV | |
| 2008 | Aren't You a Criminal? | Sandy/Yōko/Kurobe | TV Asahi | Episode 3 |
| 2008 | Walkin' Butterfly | Michiko Torayasu | TV Tokyo | Main Role |
| 2008 | Galileo | | Fuji TV | Episode Phi |
| 2009 | Mei-chan no Shitsuji | Fujiko Natsume | Fuji TV | |
| 2009 | Ninkyo Helper | Yayoi Hino | Fuji TV | |
| 2009 | Samurai High School | Kanae | NTV | Episodes 1 and 2 |
| 2009 | Real Clothes | Mami Konishi | Fuji TV | Episodes 6 and 7 |
| 2010 | Code Blue | Saki Saito | Fuji TV | Season 2, Episode 3 |
| 2010 | Hotaru no Hikari | Mana Sugishita | NTV | |
| 2011 | Diplomat Kosaku Kuroda | Haruko | Fuji TV | Episode 1 |
| 2011 | Ouran High School Host Club | Ayame Jonouchi | TBS | Episode 3 |
| 2012–2013 | Switch Girl!!/Switch Girl!! 2 | Nito | Fuji TV Two, Fuji TV | Episode 2, Episode 3 |
| 2013 | Kumo no Kaidan | Yukari Kawai | NTV | |
| 2013 | Bussen | Tsubasa Sanjo | TBS | |
| 2013 | Yamada-kun and the Seven Witches | Leona Miyamura | Fuji TV | Episode 7 |
| 2014 | Hanako to Anne | Sumiko Okura | NHK | Asadora |
| 2014 | Kyaroringu: Christmas no Kiseki | Rei | NHK BS Premium | |
| 2014 | Woman won't allow it. | Rieko Ozawa | TBS | Episode 6 |
| 2015 | Ishitachi no Renai Jijō | Wakabayashi | Fuji TV | |
| 2015 | Siren | Mahiru | Fuji TV | Episode 6 and 7 |

=== Film ===
| Year | Title | Role | Director | Notes |
|---|---|---|---|---|
| 2007 | 16 [jyu-roku] | | Hiroshi Okuhara | |
| 2008 | Bokura no Hōteishiki | | Eiji Uchida | |
| 2008 | Yesterdays | Akane Makimura | Takashi Kubota | |
| 2009 | Kanna-san Daiseikō Desu! | Nanako Sumidagawa | Koichi Inoue | |
| 2012 | Hotaru the Movie: It's Only a Little Light in My Life | Mana Sugishita | Hiroshi Yoshino | |
| 2013 | The Great Passage | | Yuya Ishii | |
| 2014 | Live | Bow Gun Angel | Noboru Iguchi | |
| 2017 | Utsukushii Hito Saba? | | Isao Yukisada | |
