= Heavenly Bodies =

Heavenly Bodies may refer to:

- "Heavenly Bodies" (song), by Earl Thomas Conley, 1982
- Heavenly Bodies (band), a 1980s English new wave band
- Heavenly Bodies (film), a 1984 Canadian film
- Heavenly Bodies (professional wrestling), professional wrestling tag team

== See also ==
- Astronomical objects, or heavenly bodies
- Heavenly Body (disambiguation)
