= Ane no Kekkon =

Japanese manga series

姉の結婚
- Genre: Romance, slice of life
- Manga
- Written by: Keiko Nishi
- Published by: Shogakukan
- Magazine: Flowers
- Original run: September 28, 2010 – August 2014
- Volumes: 8

Ane no Kekkon (姉の結婚; lit. "Older Sister's Marriage") is a Japanese slice of life romance josei manga series written and illustrated by Keiko Nishi. It was serialized in Shogakukan's Flowers manga magazine from September 2010 to August 2014. It was compiled into 8 volumes published between 2011 and 2014. The series is published in French by Panini.

== Characters ==
- Yori Iwatani
- Maki

== Publication ==
Written and illustrated by Keiko Nishi, Ane no Kekkon was serialized in Shogakukan's Flowers manga magazine from September 28, 2010, to August 2014.

=== Volumes ===
- 1 (May 10, 2011)
- 2 (November 10, 2011)
- 3 (May 10, 2012)
- 4 (November 24, 2012)
- 5 (May 10, 2013)
- 6 (November 10, 2013)
- 7 (May 9, 2014)
- 8 (November 10, 2014)

== Reception ==
Volume 1 reached the 16th place on the weekly Oricon manga chart and, as of May 15, 2011, has sold 21,534 copies; volume 2 reached the 10th place and, as of November 13, 2011, has sold 54,922 copies; volume 3 reached the 8th place and, as of May 20, 2012, has sold 108,418 copies; volume 4 reached the 8th place and, as of December 9, 2012, has sold 136,153 copies; volume 5 reached the 8th place and, as of May 11, 2013, has sold 59,486 copies; volume 6 reached the 5th place and, as of November 17, 2013, has sold 122,828 copies; volume 7 reached the 8th place and, as of May 18, 2014, has sold 123,378 copies; volume 8 reached the 3rd place and, as of November 23, 2014, has sold 139,476 copies. The series was the 14th Shogakukan manga series with the largest number of first printings between April 2013 and March 2014, with 180,000.

On manga-news.com, it has a staff grade of 15.67 out of 20. On Manga Sanctuary, it has a staff grade from one staff member of 8 out of 10.

It was number 4 on the 2012 Kono Manga ga Sugoi! Top 20 Manga for Female Readers survey and number 10 on the 2013 list. It was number 14 on the 15th Book of the Year list by Da Vinci magazine.
