= Glass Sky =

Japanese manga anthology

- English edition

小さなガラスの空 (Chiisana Garasu no Sora)
- Genre: Yaoi
- Manga
- Written by: Yugi Yamada
- Published by: Houbunsha
- English publisher: NA: Digital Manga Publishing
- Published: February 2000
- Volumes: 1

Glass Sky (Japanese: 小さなガラスの空, Hepburn: Chiisana Garasu no Sora) is a Japanese manga anthology written and illustrated by Yugi Yamada. It is licensed in North America by Digital Manga Publishing, which released the manga through its June imprint, on December 12, 2007.

== Reception ==
Leroy Douresseaux, writing for Comic Book Bin, felt the manga's storytelling is unusually awkward for Yamada, but praised her "loose, cartoony" drawing style as being very effective in showing "both the external and internal states of the characters". Briana Lawrence, writing for Mania Entertainment, felt that the range of stories presented made the anthology "sure to please anyone" who reads it. She especially enjoyed the story about the two older men who reconnect after performing a play together, and the title story, which deals with gay bashing, rare in a boys love manga. Holly Ellingwood, writing for Active Anime, praised the humour in the anthology, appreciating their "subtle poignancy" and occasionally finding them too short. Ellingwood criticised the tendency for characters from different stories to "look a tad too much like" each other. Hannah Santiago, writing for the appendix to Manga: The Complete Guide, disliked the manga, saying that "the art is awkward, the characters shallow, and the plots unengaging". She also disliked the rape themes of the end of the book.

== See also ==
- Laugh Under the Sun and Spring Fever - other works by Yugi Yamada showing Naoki
