= Flower of the Deep Sleep =

Manga written and drawn by Yuana Kazumi

- First English edition of Flower of the Deep Sleep

ふかい眠りの花 (Fukai Nemuri no Hana)
- Genre: Drama, Supernatural
- Manga
- Written by: Yuana Kazumi
- Published by: Kadokawa Shoten
- English publisher: EU: Carlsen Comics; NA: Tokyopop; SEA: Ever Glory Publishing
- Original run: January 17, 2003 – August 11, 2003
- Volumes: 2

Flower of the Deep Sleep (ふかい眠りの花, Fukai Nemuri no Hana) is a Japanese manga written and illustrated by Yuana Kazumi. The manga was licensed in North America by Tokyopop, licensed in Germany by Carlsen Comics and Taiwan by Ever Glory Publishing.

== Plot ==
Yuuki, a girl who can see into the future via her dreams, is caught in a love triangle between her own sister, Yuuka, and the two brothers they are to marry: Ryuune, who can read minds, and Ryuunosuke, who has the psychic power to soothe. When a strange dream girl starts to drag people into a coma-like sleep, Yuuki must enter people's dreams and save them.

== Manga ==
Kadokawa Shoten released the manga's two bound volumes between January 17, 2003, and August 11, 2003. Tokyopop released the manga's two bound volumes on May 22, 2007. Ever Glory Publishing released the manga's two bound volumes between October 17, 2003, and August 10, 2004.

== Reception ==
Mania.com's Eduardo M. Chavez comments on the attempt of the author, Yuana Kazumi, to make the concept of "dream worlds and magical boyfriends" work. Animefringe.com's Patrick King commends the manga for its art.
