= Pretty Poison (manga) =

Japanese manga

毒薬と乙女 (Dokuyaku to Otome)
- Genre: Romance
- Manga
- Written by: Yutta Narukami
- Published by: Ohzora Shuppan
- English publisher: Aurora Publishing
- Published: October 17, 2006
- Volumes: 1

Pretty Poison (毒薬と乙女, Dokuyaku to Otome) is a Japanese manga written and illustrated by Yutta Narukami. It was published by Ohzora Publishing in Japan in October 2006, and released by Aurora Publishing in English in July 2008.

== Reception ==
Johanna Draper Carlson described the protagonist as "wishy-washy", and felt the faces of the characters were "generic". Sam Kusek felt that the stories were not just about sex.
