= Rachel Thorn =

Manga translator and anthropologist

- Born: Matt Thorn; May 12, 1965 (age 61)
- Occupations: Cultural anthropologist, associate professor, translator
- Known for: Manga translation

Rachel Thorn (formerly Matt Thorn; born May 12, 1965) is a cultural anthropologist and a faculty member at the Kyoto Seika University's Faculty of Global Culture (in the Japanese Culture Course) in Japan.

She is best known in North America for her work dealing with shōjo manga (Japanese comics for girls). She has appeared at multiple anime conventions, including Otakon 2004. She chose to translate shōjo manga into English after reading The Heart of Thomas by Moto Hagio in the mid-1980s. She also wrote a column about shojo manga called Girls Stuff for the Animerica magazine in the 90s.

In March 2010, it was announced that Thorn would edit a line of manga co-published by Shogakukan and Fantagraphics.

== Bibliography ==
The following credits are for translation unless otherwise noted. Most of the translation credits are as "Matt Thorn":

- 2001 Nights, by Yukinobu Hoshino
- A, A', by Moto Hagio
- AD Police, by Tony Takezaki
- Banana Fish, by Akimi Yoshida (vols. 1–4, translated with Yuji Oniki)
- Battle Angel Alita, by Yukito Kishiro
- Dance Till Tomorrow, by Naoki Yamamoto
- A Drunken Dream and Other Stories, by Moto Hagio (translator and editor)
- Fanning the Flames: Fans and Consumer Culture in Contemporary Japan, edited by William W. Kelly (anthology, one chapter by Thorn)
- Four Shōjo Stories, an anthology of shōjo manga by Keiko Nishi, Moto Hagio, and Shio Satō
- The Heart of Thomas, by Moto Hagio (translator and editor)
- The Legend of Kamui, by Sanpei Shirato
- Love Song, an anthology of short stories by Keiko Nishi
- Maison Ikkoku, by Rumiko Takahashi
- Mermaid Saga, by Rumiko Takahashi
- Nausicaä of the Valley of the Wind, by Hayao Miyazaki
- Otherworld Barbara, by Moto Hagio
- The Poe Clan, by Moto Hagio
- Project A-ko
- Promise by Keiko Nishi (January 1994). First shōjo manga ever published in the United States. The two stories in this manga were then included in the Four Shōjo Stories anthology.
- Red Blinds the Foolish, by Est Em
- Sanctuary, by Sho Fumimura and Ryoichi Ikegami
- Silent Möbius, by Kia Asamiya
- Striker: The Armored Warrior, by Hiroshi Takashige and Ryoji Minagawa
- Seduce Me After the Show, by Est Em (supervising translator)
- Fujimoto, Yukari (2012). "Takahashi Macoto: The Origin of Shōjo Manga Style". Mechademia. 7 (1): 24–55. doi:10.5749/minnesota/9780816680498.003.0002. ISBN 9780816680498.
- Wandering Son, by Takako Shimura
