= List of romance manga =

This is a list of romance manga.

== # ==
- 11 Eyes
- 1/2 Prince

== A ==
- Absolute Boyfriend
- Acchi Kocchi
- Addicted to Curry
- Age 12
- Aiki
- Air Gear
- Akagami no Shirayukihime
- Akaneiro ni Somaru Saka
- Aki Sora
- Akuma de Sourou
- Aishiteruze Baby
- Ane Doki
- Ane no Kekkon
- Aozora Yell
- Asu no Yoichi
- Ayashi no Ceres

== B ==
- Bakuman
- Bara no Tame ni
- Barajou no Kiss
- Beast Master
- Beauty Pop
- Bitter Virgin
- Black Bird
- Black Rose Alice
- Blood Alone
- B.O.D.Y
- Boku wa Tomodachi ga Sukunai
- Bokura ga Ita
- Btooom!

== C ==
- Campione!
- Ceres, Celestial Legend
- Change 123
- Code:Breaker
- Crash!
- Charming Junkie
- Cherry Juice

== D ==
- Dance in the Vampire Bund
- Date a Live
- DearS
- Defense Devil
- Dengeki Daisy
- Desire Climax
- Detective Conan
- The Devil Does Exist
- DNAngel
- Don't Toy with Me, Miss Nagatoro
- Dōse Mō Nigerarenai
- Doubt!!

== E ==
- Elfen Lied
- Enchanter
- Evergreen

== F ==
- Faster than a Kiss
- Final Approach
- Fortune Arterial
- Fruits Basket
- Fushigi Yuugi
- Fushigi Yuugi Genbu Kaiden
- Full Metal Panic!
- Full Moon O Sagashite
- Fragrant Flower Blooms With Dignity

== G ==
- Gakuen Polizi
- Gakuen Alice
- GE - Good Ending
- Girls Saurus
- Girls Saurus DX
- Golden Time
- Gosick
- Gou-dere Sora Nagihara
- Green Green

== H ==
- H2
- Hachimitsu ni Hatsukoi
- Hagure Yuusha no Estetica
- Hakushaku to Yousei
- Hana Kimi
- Hanakun to Koisuru Watashi
- Hana Yori Dango
- Hanjuku-Joshi
- Hapi Mari
- Happy Cafe
- Happy Hustle High
- Happy World!
- Hayate the Combat Butler
- He's My Only Vampire
- Hidan no Aria
- High School Debut
- High School DxD
- Hiyokoi
- Hirunaka no Ryuusei
- Holy Knight
- Horimiya
- Honey Hunt
- Honey So Sweet

== I ==
- Ichigo 100%
- Infinite Stratos
- Inuyasha
- Iris Zero
- Isuca
- Itazura na Kiss

== J ==
- Jigokuren - Love in Hell
- Jii-san Baa-san Wakagaeru
- Joō no Hana

== K ==
- Kaichou wa Maid-Sama!
- Kaikan Phrase
- Kamisama Hajimemashita
- Kampfer
- Kanojo ga Flag o Oraretara
- Kanokon
- Kare First Love
- Kare Kano
- Karin
- Kemeko Deluxe
- Kikou Shoujo wa Kizutsukanai
- Kimi ni Todoke
- Kimi No Iru Machi
- Kirarin Revolution
- KissxSis
- Kiss Him, Not Me
- Kodomo no Jikan
- Koko ga Uwasa no El Palacio
- Koi to Senkyo to Chocolate
- Koukou Debut
- Kure-nai
- Kurohime
- Kyō, Koi o Hajimemasu

== L ==
- Ladies vs Butlers!
- Land of the Blindfolded
- Like a Butterfly
- Lilim Kiss
- Liselotte and Witch's Forest
- Listen to Me, Girls. I Am Your Father!
- Lore Olympus
- Lotte no Omocha!
- Love Attack!
- Love Hina
- Lovely Complex

== M ==
- Maburaho
- Maga-Tsuki
- Magico
- Magikano
- Mahōka Kōkō no Rettōsei
- Mai-Hime
- Maken-ki!
- Maoyuu Maou Yuusha
- Marmalade Boy
- Marriage Royale
- Mars
- Masca
- Mayo Chiki
- Mayoi Neko Overrun
- Medaka Box
- Mei-chan no Shitsuji
- Mel Kano
- Mermaid Melody
- Meteor Prince
- Midnight Secretary
- Mirai Nikki
- Missions of Love
- Monster Musume
- Mx0
- My Little Sister Can't be This Cute
- Mysterious Girlfriend X

== N ==
- Naisho no Tsubomi
- Nagasarete Airantou
- Nana
- Narue no Sekai
- Nagareboshi Lens
- Negima! Magister Negi Magi
- Nigeru wa Haji da ga Yaku ni Tatsu
- Nisekoi
- Nōnai Poison Berry

== O ==
- Okinawa de Suki ni Natta Ko ga Hōgen Sugite Tsurasugiru
- Onidere
- Orange
- Ore no Kanojo to Osananajimi ga Shuraba Sugiru
- Otoko no Isshō
- Otoyomegatari
- Ouran High School Host Club
- Okane ga nai

== P ==
- Papa To Kiss In The Dark
- Papillon
- Paradise Kiss
- Pastel
- Peach Girl
- Perfect Girl Evolution
- Princess Lover!
- Princess Lucia
- Psyren

== R ==
- Ranma ½
- Rappi Rangai
- REC
- Renai Boukun
- Rental Magica
- ReRe Hello
- Rosario + Vampire
- Rockin' Heaven

== S ==
- Sailor Moon
- Sand Chronicles
- Sankarea
- Say "I love you"
- Seiken no Blacksmith
- Seikoku no Ryuu Kishi
- Seikon no Qwaser
- Seiyū ka-!
- Senpai to Kanojo
- Sensual Phrase
- Sekirei
- Shakugan no Shana
- Shiki no Zenjitsu
- Shina Dark
- Shugo Chara!
- Skip Beat!
- So, I Can't Play H!
- Special A
- Stellar Theater
- Stepping on Roses
- Superior
- Suzuka
- Sword Art Online
- SWOT

== T ==
- Tasogare Otome x Amnesia
- Taiyō no Ie
- The Breaker: New Waves
- The Bride of the Water God
- The World God Only Knows
- To Love Ru
- Tokyo Alice
- Tokyo Ravens
- Tokyo Tarareba Musume
- Tonari no Kaibutsu-kun
- Tora Dora
- Trinity Seven
- True Love

== U ==
- Ultra Cute
- Ultra Maniac

== V ==
- Vampire Knight

== W ==
- We Were There
- White Album
- Wild Act
- Watashi ni xx Shinasai!
- Watashi no Messiah-sama
- Watashitachi no Tamura-kun
- Witch Craft Works

== Y ==
- Yahari Ore no Seishun Love Come wa Machigatteiru
- Yamada-kun to 7-nin no Majo
- Yasuko to Kenji
- Yomeiro Choice
- Yume Miru Taiyō
- Yumeiro Patissiere
- Yumekui Merry

== Z ==
- Zero No Tsukaima
- Zettai Kareshi
- Zettai Karen Children

== See also ==
- List of romance comics
