= Sounds of Love (manga) =

Japanese manga

ラヴァーズ・コンチェルト ～旋律の魔術師～ (Ravāzu Koncheruto - Senritsu no Majutsushi)
- Genre: Romance
- Manga
- Written by: Rin Tanaka
- Published by: Ohzora Shuppan
- English publisher: Aurora Publishing
- Published: 17 December 2007
- Volumes: 1

Sounds of Love (ラヴァーズ・コンチェルト ～旋律の魔術師～, Ravāzu Koncheruto - Senritsu no Majutsushi; lit. "Lover's Concerto: Melody of Magic") is a Japanese manga written and illustrated by Rin Tanaka. It was published by Ohzora Publishing in Japan in December 2007, and released by Aurora Publishing in English in November 2008.

== Reception ==
Johanna Draper Carlson described the title story as "horrible". Katherine Dacey felt the stories following the pianist couple were formulaic and lacked dramatic tension due to this. Amy Grocki recommended it for readers looking for something more mature than shōjo manga.
