= Flock of Angels =

Japanese manga series

- English cover of Flock of Angels volume 1

天使の群れ (Tenshi no Mure)
- Manga
- Written by: Shoko Hamada
- Published by: Asahi Sonorama
- English publisher: NA: Aurora Publishing
- Original run: October 2003 – December 2005
- Volumes: 3

Flock of Angels (Japanese: 天使の群れ, Hepburn: Tenshi no Mure) is a shōjo manga by Shoko Hamada and published by Asahi Sonorama. It was licensed and published into English in for release in North America by Aurora Publishing in 2007. Reception of the English release of the series has been mixed. The artwork has overall been called crude and the plot was the focus of criticism, but reviewers praised the story for its message.

== Plot ==
A pop band called Angelaid creates a fashion amongst their fans to wear angel wings. This permits sufferers of angelosis, a stigmatized disease which causes angel wings to sprout from people's backs, to hide their affliction. Shea suddenly sprouts angel wings, and his brother tapes Shea's wings and sends it into the news, so Shea becomes a government spokesman on accepting angelosis.

== Release ==
In 2007, Aurora Publishing confirmed it had the license to publish Flock of Angels into English for release ion North America. The first volume was released in August 2007 and concluded with the third volume in June 2008.

== Reception ==
Casey Brienza from Anime News Network gave the English release of the manga a B rating. He states that there is an "Intriguing socio-political commentary buried beneath an improbable plot premise" but that the narrative is poor and the characters are not developed well. Greg Hackmann from Mania gave the first two volumes reviews. For both volumes he criticizes the artwork calling it "poor and crude". The first volume he describes as having large plot holes with large parts of the plot being "completely nonsensical". Greg calls the second volume a mild improvement over the first but still cites poor elements such as the plot. Johanna Carlson from Comics Worth Reading gave a review of the third English release volume of the series. She says that for those who have read the other volumes the third is the most enjoyable. She states that the message about kids accepting diversity in the story is "beautiful". Katherine Dacey from pop culture shock also gave the first English release volume a review. She gave the volume a C+ rating citing the "story's glaring weaknesses" from the long speeches in the storyline to the quickly resolved conflicts. In his review Jason Thompson gives the series 4/5 stars. He describes the artwork as crude, but praises the story for its message and completeness.
