= Four Shōjo Stories =

Manga anthology published in English

- Author: Moto Hagio; Keiko Nishi; Shio Satō
- Translator: Rachel Thorn
- Language: English
- Genre: Fantasy, romance, science fiction
- Publisher: Viz Media, Shogakukan
- Publication date: February 1996
- Publication place: United States
- ISBN: 1-56931-055-6

Four Shōjo Stories is a manga anthology published by Viz Media in 1996. It is a collection of shōjo manga – manga aimed at an audience of adolescent girls and young adult women – containing two works by the manga artist Keiko Nishi and one each by the manga artists Moto Hagio and Shio Satō. It was one of the earliest published works of shōjo manga released in English. The book was later pulled from publication, as Viz did not seek permission from the original publisher Shogakukan to publish the works collected in Four Shōjo Stories as an anthology.

== Works ==
Promise by Keiko Nishi

The brother and father of Reiko, a teenage girl, died not long after she was born. She must cope with her mother neglecting her, including her mother's decision to remarry. Reiko begins skipping school and she often meets by chance a boy who had helped her when she was little. He helps her get used to her new situation.

They Were Eleven by Moto Hagio

Ten young space cadets are put onto a decommissioned spaceship as their final test. If they pass this test, their lifelong dreams of being valued people in their respective societies will come true. They find upon reaching the ship that they have an eleventh member. The crew suffers hyperthermia because their ship is too close to a star, and they must find out which of their number is the spy.

The Changeling by Shio Satō

In the distant future, Lin is employed to check up on Earth's terraforming efforts. She runs across a peaceful-seeming world, but her ship is nearly sabotaged.

Since You've Been Gone by Keiko Nishi

An unfaithful husband is with his lover as an earthquake devastates his home. His wife refuses to be evacuated, as she wants to find a purse with "deep sentimental value".

== Release ==
Four Shōjo Stories was published by Viz Media in February 1996, and translated by Rachel Thorn.It was one of the earliest shōjo manga released in English in North America. Viz did not seek permission to publish the four stories as an anthology, and were forced to pull the book from distribution when the original rights holder Shogakukan learned the stories had been published in this format.. The titles had originally been distributed individually by Viz: They Were Eleven as a monthly comic series in 1995, Promise and Since You've Been Gone as a single comic book titled Promise in April 1994, and The Changeling was serialized in Animerica in 1995 (volume 3, issues #5 and #6).

== Reception ==
Shaenon K. Garrity described it as being "an odd mix" of stories, attributing this to the "very little" amount of shōjo manga available in English at that time. She describes Promise as being "affecting", and regards the story of The Changeling to be "engaging", although she describes its art as "sparse and uneven". She believes the best of the four to be Hagio's They Were Eleven. Garrity describes Four Shōjo Stories as being one of the best short manga anthologies in English. Debbie Carton, writing for Booklist, regarded the book as a "fascinating introduction to the world of shojo manga" and regarded the range of stories included to be a positive. She recommended it for any collection including graphic novels. Michelle Smith, writing for Soliloquy in Blue and Manga Bookshelf, gave the collection a B+, praising Hagio and Satou's stories, noting The Changeling stuck in her head after she had finished and made her wish something else by Sato would get licensed .
