= Toudoukan =

Japanese sports memorabilia store

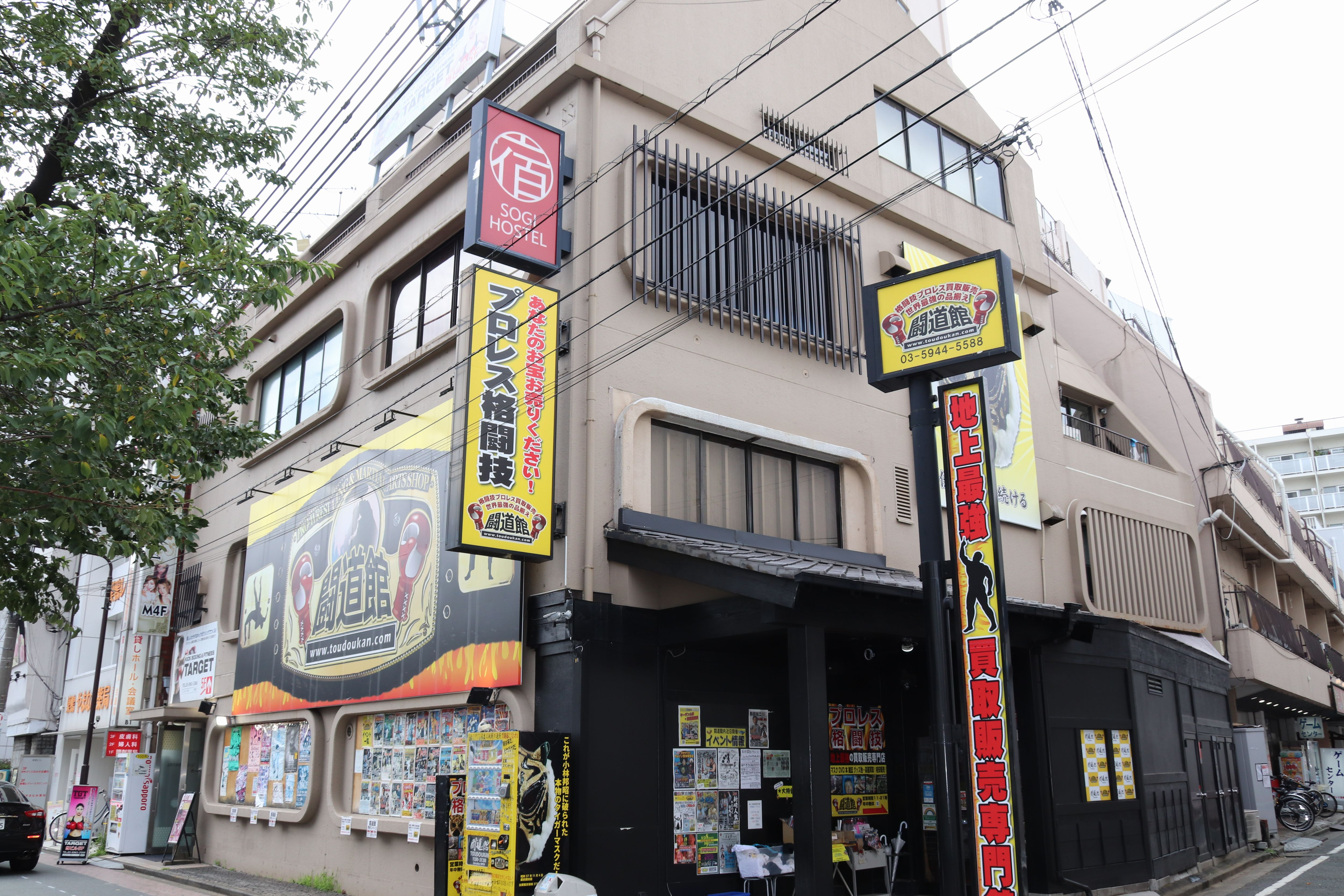
- Storefront
- Type: Store
- Industry: Professional wrestling and fighting sports
- Founded: 2001
- Founder: Takashi Izumi
- Headquarters: Tokyo, Japan
- Area served: Japan
- Products: Pro wrestling and fighting sports memorabilia
- Website: Toudoukan.com

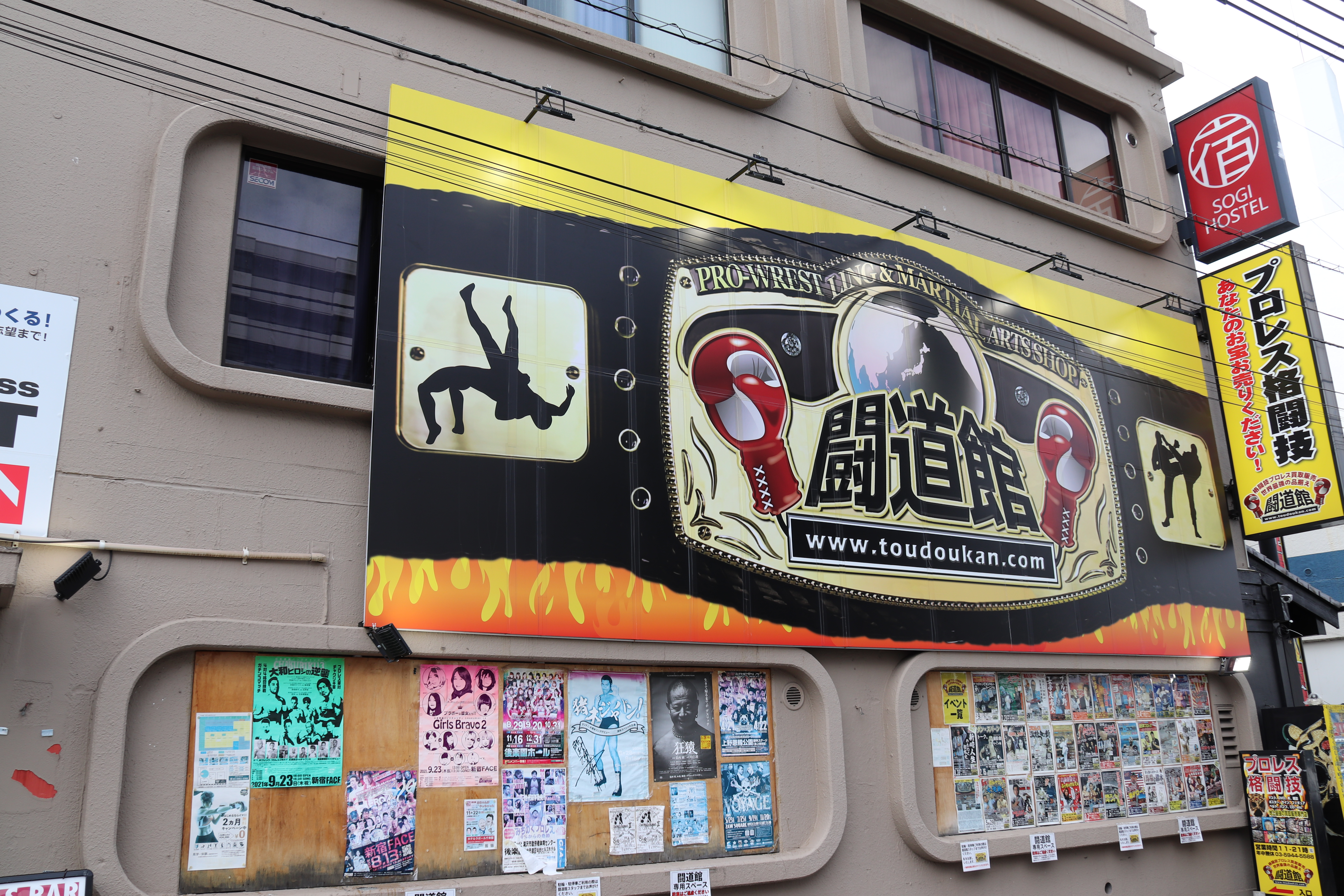
The side of the store

Toudoukan (Japanese:闘道館), is a professional wrestling, MMA and fighting sports memorabilia store and event space in Bunkyō, Tokyo, Japan. The store is known as the mecca for pro wrestling goods.

== Information ==
The shop was opened in 2001 in the Bunkyō ward of Tokyo by Takashi Izumi. The location is notable as the area has other professional wrestling landmarks including the Tokyo Dome, Korakuen Hall and New Japan Pro Wrestling's Toukon shop within walking distance. The shop was initially opened as a professional wrestling version of a manga cafe where you could drink, eat and either read wrestling books or watch wrestling videos. In order to build a large enough collection for a library, the store started to collect various wrestling items from around the country. During this process, Izumi realized that there was a need for a used pro wrestling items store and started selling excess items. Customers found the manga cafe concept confusing and the store became a pro wrestling sports memorabilia store. The shop saw more success after their rebranding and were able to expand to the floor above. The shop moved to a larger building that said to be almost double the size of the original location in 2018. A Japanese Kūdō champion named Kiyohisa Kato, helped commemorate the store's new location by appearing for an event there. The shop hosted a press conference for a Shuji Ishikawa vs Atsushi Onita match in 2019. The shop hosted pro wrestler, Kenoh on October 19, 2019. The shop co-hosted an art exhibition for "Welfare and Pro Wrestling" in 2021. Tiger Mask made an appearance at the shop in 2022 for a memorial Q&A session on Strong Kobayashi. On January 9, 2023, the store hosted a Q&A session with former Japanese women's wrestler, Megumi Kudo.

== Notable items ==
Wrestling masks unexpectedly became a hot item at the store and over the years, the store has become known for its rare mask collection. The store had a Tiger Mask ring-worn mask from 1981 that has been appraised at ¥5,000,000 ($37,931 USD). Later, blood stained Tiger Mask masks were sold for ¥2,000,000 and ¥3,000,000. The store also has a ring-worn Antonio Inoki robe that was valued at ¥4,400,000, a World Boxing Council official championship belt and Yoshio Shirai's boxing gloves that were worn during a world title fight against Dado Marino. The store also has an electrified, barbed wire Japanese rice scooper that was used by Atsushi Onita in a match in 2015. The store also acquired a prized trophy awarded to the legendary Rikidozan in 1962 and kept in his family home after his death, honoring his winning the Japan Pro Wrestling Alliance tag team championship with partner Toyonobori in Toyonaka. In 2024, Rikidozan's trophy would be merged by Canada's Maple Leaf Pro Wrestling with Kenny Omega's 2011 Wrestling Retribution Project trophy into the PWA Champions Grail, their world championship title.

== In popular culture ==
Izumi and Toudoukan have been featured multiple times on Japanese television. The store has been featured in Nippon TV's, Black Wide Show in 2003. The store was featured on TV Tokyo's, Good luck! appraisal variety show several times between 2006 and 2016. The store was used in TV Tokyo's serial drama, Walkin' Butterfly in 2008 and was featured on Amazon Prime's Arita Pro Wrestling International in 2020.
