= Ever Glory Publishing =

Taiwanese manga publisher

Ever Glory Publishing Co., Ltd. 長鴻出版社股份有限公司
- Type: Private
- Industry: publication
- Genre: manga
- Founded: Tainan City, Taiwan June 1991
- Headquarters: Tainan City, Taiwan
- Revenue: 元1.36 million
- Parent: Nan I Book Enterprise Co., Ltd.
- Website: http://www.egmanga.com.tw/

Ever Glory Publishing (長鴻出版社股份有限公司, lit. 'Ever Glory Publishing Co., Ltd') is a Taiwanese publisher of manga. It was founded in June 1991. In October 1992, the company obtained the Chinese license for Akita Shoten's Weekly Shōnen Champion. However, the magazine stopped publication in 1998.

== Controversy ==
There were two major changes to the way Ever Glory categorised it's magazines. The first change implemented categorising the magazines into 25 categories instead of only separating them into two genre, Shōnen and Shōjo. The genre description with a number was used as an indication. This has been criticised by fans as being too complicated. The second change was using the rainbow spectrum to categorise the magazines into 7 categories. In 2015, the latest category as 4 categories only: "Male", "Female", "BL&GL" and "Public".

It has also been criticised for being slow to translate manga up to 2 years after the original manga has been released. (Normally, publishers will translate manga within 6 months of the original manga being published)

== Works ==
- Boku wa Imōto ni Koi o Suru
- Bokurano: Ours (published 6 out of 10 volumes)
- Cardcaptor Sakura
- Chibi Vampire (Karin)
- Chichin Pui
- Elfen Lied
- Crest of the Royal Family
- Feel 100%
- Flower of the Deep Sleep
- Giant Robo: The Day the Earth Burned
- Gimmick! (manga)
- Grenadier (manga)
- Hitohira
- Ibitsu (Okada Kazuto)
- Indian Summer (manga)
- Katte ni Kaizō
- Kyōkasho ni Nai!
- Landreaall (published 4 out of 13 volumes)
- Minamisawa Hisakei's Luwon (abandoned)
- Saiyuki Reload
- Devils and Realist
- Rozen Maiden
- Ruff Love
- Sundome
- Steal Moon
- Super Radical Gag Family
- Tenshi ja Nai
- Tenshi no Hitsugi: Ave Maria (abandoned / unfinished)
- Wandering Son (abandoned half-way)
- Yurara
