= Seduce Me After the Show =

Japanese manga

- Cover of Seduce Me After the Show

ショーが跳ねたら逢いましょう (Shō ga Hanetara Aimashō)
- Genre: Yaoi, Drama
- Manga
- Written by: est em
- Published by: Tokyo Mangasha
- English publisher: NA: Aurora Publishing
- Magazine: Marble Comics
- Original run: 2006 – present
- Volumes: 1

Seduce Me After the Show (ショーが跳ねたら逢いましょう, Shō ga Hanetara Aimashō) is a Boys' Love manga by est em released in English by Aurora Publishing in April 2008. It will be republished in English by Digital Manga. It was released in French as Tango by Editions H. Seduce Me After the Show contains five short stories set in the artistic worlds of dance, painting, and music. Rachel Matt Thorn, est em's former teacher, retranslated the work prior to its publication. The author has said that she drew the book in around two months, and had her friends help to erase background elements in the draft pages.

== Plot ==
In the title story, "Seduce Me After the Show" the story opens with Theo Galland, a ballet dancer prodigy, performing the dual role of the fiery, free spirited Carmen and the doomed and captured Jose in the musical dance Carmen. After performing Carmen, Theo Galland abandons his own dancing career for Hollywood acting when his famous dancer mother dies on her way to see his show. And it is here that Theo meets Daren Ferguson, a Hollywood actor, and once again begins dancing feverishly to the Carmen tango with a partner. They exchange a joking kiss, and playfully suggest the relationship may develop further.

== Reception ==
About.com's Deb Aoki lists Seduce Me After the Show as the best yaoi manga of 2008. The stories are considered atypical for the genre as they are melancholy, without a clear happy ending. est em's art is also considered atypical as she uses little screentoning or shading, creating a "rough and raw" and "challenging" feel to her art. Deb Aoki expressed surprise that est em's characters were adult men, even "old and wrinkled" men, rather than boys, and described the tone of the manga as "wistfully romantic". David Welsh praised est em's skills at showing character development, creating stories which feel tailored to the characters. Seduce Me After the Show won the "Best One-Shot/Anthology" and "Best Yaoi" awards from PopCultureShock for 2008, with the reviewer commenting that the characters have lives and goals outside of their relationships, which they regard as expanding the appeal of Seduce Me After the Show to more readers than those who are already fans of boys' love works.

== See also ==
- Age Called Blue, about Billy, Nick, Pete and Joe.
