= Jun Toba =

Japanese actor and musician (born 1978)

Jun Toba 鳥羽 潤
- Born: October 13, 1978 (age 46); Arida, Wakayama, Japan
- Occupation(s): Actor, musician
- Years active: 1996–present
- Website: Official website

Jun Toba (鳥羽 潤, Toba Jun, born October 13, 1978 in Arida, Wakayama, Japan) is a Japanese actor and musician who is represented by the talent agencies, Amuse, Inc., and later, Office Nigun Niiba.

== Early life ==
On October 13, 1978, Toba was born in Wakayama prefecture, Japan.

== Career ==
Toba won the Japan Academy Prize Newcomer Award, the Osaka Film Festival Newcomer Prize, and the Kinema Junpō Best Ten Newcomer Actor Award. He also put a force on music activities, which he released the mini album, Inner Vision in November 2004. Toba's activities were in the band SpraSight, and now formed the band Razhead Modic, which is active in the music world. The band has been active as Geenie.

== Filmography ==
=== TV series ===
Year	Title	Role	Network	Notes
1996	Pure	Kota Toyama	Fuji TV	
1996	Sei Ryū Densetsu	Reiichi Hayami	NTV	
1997	Mokuyō no Kaidan		Fuji TV	
1997	Eve	Kan Shinoyama	Fuji TV	
1999	Kanojotachi no Jidai	Shina Nishida	Fuji TV	
2000	Fly Kōkū Gakuen Graffiti	Ryota Takagi	NHK	
2000	Naniwa Kin'yūdō	Toru	Fuji TV	
2001	Good Combination	Ryuhei Koyasu	NHK	Lead role
2001	Es Kikenna Tobira: Ai o Tejō de Tsunagu Toki	Yu Hamura	TV Asahi	Lead role
2001	Hyōten 2001	Toru Tsujikuchi	TV Asahi	
2002	Locker no Hanako-san	Takumi Sasana	NHK	
2003	Boku no Ikiru Michi	Ryoku Okada	KTV	
2003	Kao	Gen Shirakawa	Fuji TV	
2003	Kunimitsu no Sei		KTV	Guest appearance
2003	Sky High	Musician Ryota	TV Asahi	Episode 7
2003	Nikoniko Nikki	Yuki Morimura	NHK	
2003	Omiya-san 3		TV Asahi	Episode 11; Guest appearance
2004	Socrates in Love	Junpei Majima	TBS	Episodes 6 and 7
2004	Hikeshi-ya Komachi	Shinro Inui	NHK	
2004	Mystery Minzoku Gakusha Yakumoitsuki	Kazumaro Gotoda	TV Asahi	
2005	Rikon Bengoshi II	Hiroyuki Tsunoda	Fuji TV	
2005	Koisuru Nichiyōbi		BS-TBS	
2006	Shinsengumi!! Hijikata Toshizō Saigo no Tsuitachi	Yamano Yasohachi	NHK	
2006	Sentō no Musume!?	Susumu Mannaka	MBS	
2007	Konyoku Rotenburo Renzoku Satsujin		ABC	
2007	Shin Kyōto Meikyū Annai	Takashi Nakatsu	TV Asahi	4th Series, Episode 7
2007	Kishō Yohō-shi Fujiko Osawa no Jiken File	Takuya Konno	Fuji TV	
2007	Yoru no Owaru Toki		TBS	
2008	Tokugawa Fūunroku Hachidai Shōgun Yoshimune		TV Tokyo	
2008	Kyoto e Okoshiyasu!	Toru Kurata	MBS	
2008	Rookies		TBS	
2008	Walkin' Butterfly	Ko Mihara	TV Tokyo	
2008	Manbiki G Men Yuki Nikaido		TBS	
2009	Watashi ga Hajimete Tsukutta Drama		NHK BShi	Lead role
2010	Shōfu to Shukujo	Masahiko Kugayama, Yohei Kuzuhara	THK	
2011	Hanawa-ka no Shi Shimai		TBS	Episode 2
2011	Reiko Kamijo no Jiken Suiri	Koji Takemura	TBS	
2012	Makete, Katsu: Sengo o Tsukutta Otoko Shigeru Yoshida		NHK	
2014	Keishichō Minamidaira Han: Nana-ri no Deka	Keisuke Yamaji	TBS	
2014	Gunshi Kanbei	Akechi Hidemitsu	NHK	
2014	Iryū Sōsa	Kazuki Nagashima	TV Asahi	
2015	Seicho Matsumoto Mystery Jidaigeki	Yotaro	BS Japan	Lead role

=== Films ===
Year	Title	Role	Notes
1996	Boku wa Benkyō ga Dekinai	Hidemi Tokita	Lead role
1997	Moonlight Serenade	Koji Onda	
1998	Kawaī Hito		Episode3; Lead role
2001	Hikari no Ame		
2002	Hoshi no Restaurant	Hiromi Kataoka	
2004	Blooming Again		
2004	Umi Neko	Shusuke Takayama	
2005	Shi-kakan no Kiseki	Makoto Hagiwara	
2008	Love Fight	Serizawa	
2009	Rookies	Okihara	
2010	Tsuki to Uso to Satsujin	Yuji Oshiro	
2012	Until the Break of Dawn		
2015	Gaim Gaiden: Kamen Rider Duke	Kugai Kudo	V-Cinema
