= Sound of Love =

Sound of Love may refer to:

- Sound of Love (album), an album by Paul Motian
- "Sound of Love" (song), a song by the Bee Gees
- Pyar Ka Taraana (lit. 'Sound of Love'), a 1993 Indian Hindi-language film
- Pyar Ki Dhun (lit. 'Sound of Love'), a 2002 Indian Hindi-language film

== See also ==
- Sounds of Love (disambiguation)
