= They Were Eleven =

Japanese science fiction manga series and its adaptations

- Cover of the 2019 reissued collected edition

11人いる！ (Jūichinin Iru!)
- Genre: Science fiction, suspense
- Manga
- Written by: Moto Hagio
- Published by: Shogakukan
- English publisher: NA: Denpa
- Magazine: Bessatsu Shōjo Comic
- Original run: September 1975 – November 1975
- Volumes: 1
- Manga

Zoku Jūichinin Iru!; Higashi no Chihei, Nishi no Towa
- Written by: Moto Hagio
- Published by: Shogakukan
- English publisher: NA: Denpa
- Magazine: Bessatsu Shōjo Comic
- Original run: December 1976 – February 1977
- Volumes: 1
- Live-action television film
- Directed by: Tōru Minegishi
- Written by: Mamoru Sasaki
- Music by: Ryōhei Hirose
- Original network: NHK
- Released: January 2, 1977
- Runtime: 45 minutes
- Anime film
- Directed by: Satoshi Dezaki; Tsuneo Tominaga
- Written by: Toshiaki Imaizumi; Kazumi Koide
- Music by: Yasuhiko Fukuda
- Studio: Magic Bus
- Licensed by: NA: Central Park Media; (expired)
- Released: November 1, 1986
- Runtime: 91 minutes
- Stage plays
- They Were Eleven; Axel: June 25, 2004 – July 11, 2004; Axel: December 26, 2008 – January 12, 2009; Studio Life: February 5, 2011 – March 27, 2011; Studio Life: January 10, 2013 – January 20, 2013; Studio Life: May 18, 2019 – June 2, 2019; Sequel manga series; Studio Life: February 28, 2013 – April 7, 2013; Morning Musume '16: June 11, 2016 – June 26, 2016
- Audio drama
- Produced by: Yoshiaki Imanishi; Shima Yoshida
- Written by: Hikari Onodera
- Released: September 25, 2013
- Episodes: 8
- icon

They Were Eleven (Japanese: 11人いる！, Hepburn: Jūichinin Iru!) is a Japanese science fiction manga series written and illustrated by Moto Hagio. It was serialized in three issues of Shogakukan's Bessatsu Shōjo Comic magazine in 1975. The following year, it won the 21st Shogakukan Manga Award in the combined shōjo and shōnen category. The series has inspired a live-action television film, an anime film, multiple stage plays, and an audio drama CD. It also inspired a sequel manga series, Zoku Jūichinin Iru! Higashi no Chihei, Nishi no Towa (続・11人いる！東の地平・西の永遠; "They Were Eleven, Continued: Horizon of the East, Eternity of the West"), serialized in Bessatsu Shōjo Comic magazine from 1976 to 1977. They Were Eleven was originally licensed in English by Viz Media in floppy comics format in 1995, and published in the manga anthology Four Shōjo Stories in 1996. The series and its sequel have been licensed by Denpa for a new English-language release in 2022. The anime film was originally licensed in English by Central Park Media, but it was discontinued in 2004.

== Story ==
Ten young space cadets are put onto a decommissioned spaceship as their final test. If they pass this test, their lifelong dreams of being valued people in their respective societies will come true. Their orders are to survive as long as they can with what they have. Once they arrive at the ship, they find that their crew has gained an eleventh member—and no one can remember the original lineup well enough to recognize which of them is the newcomer.

As the days pass, the eleven cadets must deal with their suspicions of each other as well as the sudden knowledge that the spaceship is in a decaying orbit around a star, which is causing the temperature on the ship to rise. With this rise in temperature, a sickness begins to spread among the crew as they work to stabilize their orbit and determine who among them is the spy.

== Media ==
=== Manga ===
They Were Eleven was serialized in the September, October, and November issues of Shogakukan's Bessatsu Shōjo Comic magazine in 1975. Shogakukan collected the individual chapters, along with three unrelated short stories by Hagio, into a single bunkoban volume published on July 20, 1976. Shogakukan has since reissued They Were Eleven several times: in 1978, 1986, 1994, 2007, and 2019. Viz Media originally licensed the series for an English-language release in North America, published in four floppy volumes in 1995, and then in the now out-of-print anthology Four Shōjo Stories in 1996. In 2021, Denpa re-licensed the series for publication and released it in 2025. They Were Eleven is also licensed by Ediciones Tomodomo in Spain and by Japonica Polonica Fantastica in Poland.

==== Sequel ====
A sequel manga series, titled Zoku Jūichinin Iru! Higashi no Chihei, Nishi no Towa (続・11人いる！東の地平・西の永遠; "They Were Eleven, Continued: Horizon of the East, Eternity of the West"), was serialized in the December, January, and February issues of Bessatsu Shōjo Comic magazine in 1976 and 1977. Shogakukan collected the individual chapters into a single bunkoban volume published on August 20, 1977. Shogakukan has since reissued Zoku Jūichinin Iru! several times: first in 1978, and later in collected editions of They Were Eleven published in 1986, 1994, 2007, and 2019. In 2021, Denpa licensed the sequel series for an English-language release in North America, set to be published in the second quarter of 2025.

=== Live-action film ===
A 45-minute live-action television film adaptation of the manga was broadcast in Japan on January 2, 1977, as part of the NHK's Shōnen Drama Series. The film's screenplay was written by Mamoru Sasaki. It starred Taizō Sayama as Tada and the Takarazuka Revue's Haruka Yamashiro as Frol.

=== Anime film ===
A 91-minute anime film adaptation of the manga was released in Japan on November 1, 1986. It was licensed by Central Park Media in North America and released on VHS with English subtitles in the early 1990s. It was re-released on VHS with a newly produced English dub in 1996 and on DVD with dual language audio tracks in 2004. Central Park Media discontinued their home video release in 2004. The New York company MYC & Associates liquidated the anime license in 2009.

==== Cast ====
- Tadatos Lane (Tada): Akira Kamiya (Japanese), Curtis Jones (English)
- Frolbericheri Frol (Frol): Michiko Kawai (Japanese), Wendee Lee (English)
- King Mayan Baceska (His Majesty): Hideyuki Tanaka (Japanese), Steven Blum (English)
- Doricas Soldam IV (Fourth): Toshio Furukawa (Japanese), David Hayter (English)
- Ganigus Gagtos (Ganga): Tesshō Genda (Japanese), Dean Elliot (English)
- Amazon Carnias (Amazon): Hirotaka Suzuoki (Japanese), Steven Blum (English)
- Vidminer Knume (Knu): Norio Wakamoto (Japanese), Joe Romersa (English)
- Colonel Glenn Groff (Mule): Michihiro Ikemizu (Japanese), Henry Malloy (English)
- Dolph Tasta (Red nose): Kōzō Shioya (Japanese), Steven Blum (English)
- Toto Ni (Toto): Tarako (Japanese), Dorothy Elias-Fahn (English)
- Chaco Kacka (Chaco): Tsutomu Kashiwakura (Japanese), Dean Allen (English)

==== Staff ====
- Director: Satoshi Dezaki, Tsuneo Tominaga
- Executive Producer: Hidenori Taga
- Original Story: Moto Hagio
- Planning: Shigekazu Ochiai
- Screenplay: Toshiaki Imaizumi, Katsumi Koide
- Animation Director: Keizo Shimizu
- Character Design: Akio Sugino, Keizo Shimizu
- Effects Director: Kenichi Maejima
- Mechanical Design: Yōichi Yajima
- Art Director: Junichi Higashi
- Cinematography: Nobuo Koyama
- Audio Director: Shigeharu Shiba
- Music Director: Zen Oikawa
- Music: Yasuhiko Fukuda
  - Theme Song: "Boku no Honesty", Shinichirō Kawakami
- Producer: Minoru Kotoku
- Production: Magic Bus, Kitty Films

=== Stage plays ===
They Were Eleven has been adapted into several stage plays in Japan. The first, performed by the all-male acting troupe Axel, ran from June to July 2004; the second, performed by Axel, ran from December 2008 to January 2009; the third, performed by the all-male acting troupe Studio Life, ran from February to March 2011; the fourth, performed by Studio Life, ran throughout January 2013; and the fifth, performed by Studio Life, ran from May to June 2019.

The sequel manga series has also been adapted into two stage plays in Japan: one performed by Studio Life, which ran from February to April 2013, and another performed by the female idol group Morning Musume '16, which ran throughout June 2016.

=== Audio drama ===
An audio drama adaptation of the manga was produced by the drama CD label E-Star and released in Japan on September 25, 2013. It starred Atsushi Abe as Tada, Kazutomi Yamamoto as Frol, Kōsuke Toriumi as King Mayan Baceska, and Daisuke Kishio as Doricas Soldam IV.

== Reception ==
In 1976, They Were Eleven won the 21st (1975) Shogakukan Manga Award in the combined shōjo and shōnen category.

The manga's premise was a precursor to later social deduction games such as Raging Loop (2015), Among Us (2018) and Gnosia (2019).

== See also ==
- Lily C.A.T.
