= ReRe Hello =

Japanese manga series

- Cover of Volume 6 featuring Ririko and Minato

ReRe(リリ)ハロ (Riri Haro)
- Genre: Romance; Slice of life
- Manga
- Written by: Tōko Minami
- Published by: Shueisha
- Magazine: Bessatsu Margaret
- Original run: March 13, 2013 – September 13, 2016
- Volumes: 11

ReRe Hello (Japanese: ReRe(リリ)ハロ, Hepburn: Riri Haro) is a Japanese slice of life romance shōjo manga series written and illustrated by Tōko Minami and serialized on Shueisha's Bessatsu Margaret magazine. It is a sequel to the 2013 one-shot manga Mebuki Kimidori. The first volume was released on July 25, 2013 and it concluded in 2016 with 11 volumes.

== Plot ==
When Ririko was five years old, she lost her mother and has been since helping her father with his handyman business. When her father is hospitalized, she goes on a job for him and her client is none other than Minato Suoh, a rich high school student who lives alone. Despite being originally a one-time job, Ririko eventually begins to cook and do odd jobs for Minato on a regular basis, since he can barely look after himself. Minato also sometimes lends a hand with her father's business.

== Characters ==
- Ririko Hayakawa – An energetic and hard-working 15-year-old high school girl who cooks, cleans, and looks after her little brother. She lost her mother when she was five; being the only girl in her house, Ririko since taken on a mother-like role. When her father is hospitalized, she decides to do his work for him while he is sick and this is how she meets Minato. Ririko is shown to be kind and considerate towards others, such as how she cooks and cleans for Minato, although irritates her with his spoiled personality.
- Minato Suoh – A spoiled 15-year-old high school student who lives alone in a large apartment complex.
- Rui Hayakawa – Ririko's younger brother.
- Yuuma Saiki – Minato's best friend.
- Tadamori Koizumi – Minato's friend who plays the violin during music lessons together.

== Volumes ==
- 1 (July 25, 2013)
- 2 (November 25, 2013)
- 3 (March 25, 2014)
- 4 (July 25, 2014)
- 5 (November 25, 2014)
- 6 (February 25, 2015)
- 7 (June 25, 2015)
- 8 (October 23, 2015)
- 9 (February 25, 2016)
- 10 (June 24, 2016)
- 11 (October 25, 2016)

== Reception ==
Volume 2 reached the 16th place on the weekly Oricon manga chart and has sold 54,621 copies as of December 1, 2013. Volume 3 reached the 11th place and has sold 95,334 copies as of April 6, 2014. Volume 4 reached the 16th place and has sold 96,901 copies as of August 3, 2014. The eleventh and final volume ranked eighth with 76,565 copies sold in its first week.
