= Nightmares for Sale =

Japanese manga

- Cover of the first volume of the English release of Nightmares for Sale

悪魔のお店 Shadow & Maria (Akuma no Omise: Shadow & Maria)
- Genre: Horror
- Manga
- Written by: Kaoru Ohashi
- Published by: Asahi Sonorama
- English publisher: US: Aurora Publishing
- Original run: January 2002 – February 2002
- Volumes: 2

Nightmares for Sale (Japanese: 悪魔のお店 Shadow & Maria, Hepburn: Akuma no Omise: Shadow & Maria; lit. The Devil's Pawnshop: Shadow and Maria), is a Japanese manga series written and illustrated by Kaoru Ohashi. Nightmares for Sale is a series of short stories that feature Shadow and Maria, a duo who run a pawnshop with items for those in need. Things quickly turn horrific however, when unsuspecting customers get more than what they bargained for. The two volume series was published in Japan by Asahi Sonorama, with the first volume released in January 2002 and the second following in February. It is licensed for an English language release in North America by Aurora Publishing. The English adaptation received mixed reviews with some reviews calling them a good group of horror stories, while others cite the poor quality of them.

== Plot ==
Shadow and Maria run a pawnshop where strange trinkets have the power to grant the wildest dreams of their customers. However, dreams come at a heavy price and, most of the time, they end up giving up something that they never should have parted with in the first place.

== Release ==
Nightmares for Sale was a one shot manga series made by Kaoru Ohashi which was released in Japan by Asahi Sonorama. Two volumes were released in all, both during the first two months of 2002. In April, 2007 Aurora Publishing announced it had licensed Nightmares for Sale with a release date set for later that year. The first volume was released in November, 2007 with the second following in March, 2008.

== Reception ==
The English-language adaptation released by Aurora Publishing received mixed reviews. Sakura Eries from Mania.com reviewed both volumes. In the first volume she gave a B, saying that it is a good horror series for people who like the dark side of humanity in "bite sized chunks". The second volume was also given a B grade by Sakura. In her second review she calls the endings "more bittersweet than gruesome", but says that one of the stories in particular makes up for that. Andrew Wheeler from ComicM!x called the series an "old fashioned" horror story, saying that the stories aren't great but purely good. He goes on to say that the characters are "enigmatic", and that the stories are told accurately. Johanna Draper from Comics Worth Reading gave the series a more negative review. She calls the themes ambitious, but goes on to say that the execution is poor. She also cites that the shocking twists do not make up for the poor story structure. Katherine Dacey from PopCultureShock also gave the series a negative review giving it a D rating. In her review she says that a lot of the stories were "sloppily executed", and that the characters are "awkwardly" drawn. Manga expert Deb Aoki found the series horrific, and placed it second on a list of "13 Creepy Comics and Gruesome Graphic Novels"

== See also ==
- Friday the 13th: The Series - A TV series where a duo of cousins and their friend try to retrieve cursed antiques.
- Something Wicked This Way Comes (novel) - A novel by Ray Bradbury where a mysterious carnival owned by Mr. Dark comes to town, he then offers the townsfolk their deepest desires at a price.
