= True Love (manga) =

Japanese manga series

- Genre: Slice of life, romance
- Manga
- Written by: Miwako Sugiyama
- Published by: Shogakukan
- Magazine: Sho-Comi
- Original run: May 24, 2013 (volume 1) – March 26, 2015 (volume 7)
- Volumes: 7

True Love is a Japanese slice-of-life romance shōjo manga series written and illustrated by Miwako Sugiyama. It was published by Shogakukan, with serialization on Sho-Comi magazine and with seven volumes compiling the chapters released between 2013 and 2015.

== Synopsis ==
Ai just loves her big brother, Yuzuru! He's so kind, so reliable, and so cool! He always protects Ai from trouble and when she cries, he cheers her up! He's the perfect big brother. But, bad things happen soon. Her parents divorce and she and her brother are separated! Now, after 9 years, one day Ai, now 14-years-old, finds a tall boy in front of her school! Who is this boy?

== Plot ==
As children, siblings Yuzuru and Ai have had a close relationship. Yuzuru was known as the doting and protective older brother, and defended Ai from bullies. Their parents’ frequent arguments brought the two closer together. When they were 7 and 6 years old, their parents took them on a family vacation and all seemed to go well until they overheard their parents decision to divorce. Despite their fear of losing their family, Yuzuru promised to Ai they will be together forever. Shortly after, their parents officially divorce and the children are separated; Yuzuru moved to America with their father and Ai remained in Japan with their mother.

Nine years later, Ai is 14-years-old and still wonders about her brother, whom she hasn't had contact with other than a recent postcard. When she arrives at school, she finds an older boy and she quickly realizes he is Yuzuru, and they share a happy reunion. Their mother announces that she and her ex-husband have decided to remarry and the family begins living together again. The siblings are glad their parents reconciled and they will be able to be a family again. A year after reuniting, however, while they are moving into their new apartment, Ai accidentally falls on top of Yuzuru and kisses him. Ai immediately tries to pull away but Yuzuru kisses her again. When she questions him why he did it, he says it is a habit due to seeing people from overseas kiss as greetings. Yuzuru also reveals he will be living in his own apartment to be closer to his school. Ai begins to feel awkward around Yuzuru after the kiss and is sad he is living separately from her. She meets and befriends Nanoya who reveals she has had a crush on Yuzuru for a long time and hopes Ai can help her get closer to him, although Ai secretly feels jealous. Ai agrees to help Nanoya nevertheless. This and the gap between her and Yuzuru prompts Ai to realize she is falling in love with him, which deeply ashames her. Shortly after, she visits his high school and meets his best friend, Shuuji, who takes an instant liking to her. Ai tells Yuzuru he has an admirer but he brushes this off. Nanoya persuades Ai to introduce her to Yuzuru and the four bond together.

During a camping trip, Nanoya announces her decision to confess to Yuzuru during the trip. However, during the trip, Ai struggles to hide her despair at being unable to show her feelings for Yuzuru and breaks down. Yuzuru finds her and tries to comfort her, but when she attempts to subconsciously kiss him, he sends her away and asks Nanoya to be his girlfriend. When Ai finds out, she is very sad but tries to hide this. Yuzuru returns home to celebrate Ai's 16th birthday but he invites Nanoya, who clings to Yuzuru and this ruins Ai's happiness at being able to celebrate with her brother. Ai begins to avoid Yuzuru, who decides to make up for this by taking her to Shibuya and spending the day with her, and gives her a heart-shaped hair ornament as a birthday gift. Ai is so touched by this that she kisses Yuzuru, who pushes her away and takes her home. The next day, Ai is met by Shuuji, who says he saw the kiss but promises to keep it a secret for her sake. At school, Yuzuru tells her they need to forget what happened but Ai finally breaks down and confesses she loves him. Yuzuru tries to rationalize with her but he also ends up confessing he loves her too, and they share an embrace. They begin a secret relationship although Ai feels unsecured about their parents finding out. To cheer her up, Yuzuru starts taking her out on dates after school and breaks up with Nanoya, who refuses to give up on him. Shuuji asks Yuzuru if he is dating Ai and when he confirms this, Shuuji condemns him for committing incest but he is silenced when Yuzuru's anger intimidates him and Shuuji vows to steal Ai from Yuzuru. During a summer trip to the beach, Nanoya witnesses Ai call him ‘Yuzuru’ rather than ‘Onii-chan’. At a festival, gives Ai a flower hair ornament. Ai reluctantly helps Nanoya watch the fireworks with Yuzuru, who switched places with Shuuji so he could be with Ai. They share a kiss during the fireworks show but when a silhouetted picture of them surfaces, Nanoya realizes Yuzuru and Ai are a couple. She avoids Ai after ending their friendship and gives the picture to their mother. Yuzuru and Ai deny its them in the picture and their mother seems to believe them but Ai quickly realizes she doesn't and warns Yuzuru. Ai tries to avoid Yuzuru to not draw suspicion and feels uncomfortable when Shuuji starts making romantic advances towards her. However, Shuuji tries to help them by introducing himself as Ai's boyfriend to her parents and he is the one kissing Ai in the picture. He then asks Ai to go on a date with him in return and she agrees. However, while going to meet him for the date, she sees Yuzuru and ditches Shuuji. Yuzuru and Ai go to Karuizawa and visit a church, where Yuzuru proposes to her and suggests they run away together, which she accepts. However, they learn their father has been killed in a plane crash while returning to America for work. Upon returning home, their mother lashes out at them and forbids them from seeing each other, to the point of keeping Ai confined to the apartment. Yuzuru learns of her plan to move away with Ai but Yuzuru decides not to intervene. Once she is allowed to return to school, Ai learns Nanoya was responsible for telling her mother and Nanoya vows to never forgive her. Ai also learns of her mother's intent to move away and rushes to Yuzuru. Although both want to be together, he acknowledges it is impossible. Ai compromises that she will end the relationship if she becomes his lover, and they have sex for the first time. Afterwards, they bid farewell and Ai gives back the heart-shape ornament.

A year and a half later, Ai is closer to her mother but she still misses Yuzuru. Her mother suggests Ai apply for college in Tokyo, which she agrees to. While there, Ai runs into Shuuji, who is a first year university student. Ai tells him that Yuzuru lives in America and she hasn't heard anything from him in over a year. Ai insists she is trying to move on but she has lost all hope of her future. Meanwhile, Yuzuru attends a lab research university in America but although he is popular among his peers, he refuses to associate with women, as he too is struggling to cope with his feelings for Ai. Yuzuru remembers when he was secretly leaving for America but Shuuji found out and demanded an explanation, which Yuzuru said he only came to Japan to see Ai and if he continued to stay, he would never forget about her and he is unsure if he will ever return. Ai is unsure if she should apply to such an expensive university and her mother reveals she and her husband got married and started their family while they were still students, and suggests Ai try an omiai. Although Ai is not interested in marrying a stranger, she agrees to give a chance. The next day, Shuuji meets with his associate professor, who announces he is meeting Ai for the omiai. Shuuji immediately calls Yuzuru but Yuzuru brushes it off because he only wants Ai to live her life. Shuuji runs into Nanoya at a restaurant and he asks her to forgive the siblings and reveals Ai's decision. Ai gets a job at a bakery and Nanoya finds her to confront her. Nanoya is still unable to forgive Ai but she finally understand why she and Yuzuru kept their relationship a secret, and she truly hopes Ai can live a happier life. She then asks Ai if she intends to go through with the omiai and Ai says she doesn't want to get married but sees it as necessary to forget Yuzuru. Nanoya arrives in America for college and meets with Yuzuru, who is disappointed to see her. Nanoya asks Yuzuru to be her boyfriend again. He rejects her and Nanoya begs him to stop Ai from getting married but Yuzuru refuses because he blames himself for how Ai's life turned out. While talking to his professor, Yuzuru shows a photo of his father but the professor points out Yuzuru's father is the other man in the picture. The professor says he knew Yuzuru's parents and shows him another picture of them with Mr. Souda and a baby, and he gives Yuzuru a letter Mr. Souda left behind before he died. After reading it, Yuzuru rushes to the airport to get to Japan. The next day, Ai goes to the church she and Yuzuru visited before and tries on a wedding dress. She breaks down crying until Yuzuru surprises her by hugging her. Ai tries to reject him and Yuzuru reveals they are not siblings. In the letter, Mr. Souda wrote he knew about their relationship all along when he saw them holding hands and supported it, and he also revealed that Yuzuru's biological parents were siblings who left Japan and moved to America but were killed in a car accident shortly after Yuzuru's birth and Mr. Souda, who was a close friend, took the child in. Yuzuru tells Ai they are allowed to get married and they share an emotional embrace. Their mother, who had believed Yuzuru was Mr.Souda’s child by another woman when she met him, forgives her husband for keeping the truth from her. Yuzuru still decides to continue his studying in America and Ai agrees to have a long-distance relationship because she is only happy they can be together.

Several months later, Ai visits Yuzuru in America for Christmas and he had planned a romantic night for them but their plans are cancelled when he is called to the lab for work. Some of the women there make fun of Ai for looking so childish and Ai learns Yuzuru allowed a little girl to have her heart-shaped ornament but she is later given it back by the girl. Yuzuru purchases couple’s rings for him and Ai, and after vowing to love her forever, they spend the night together. They later visit Yuzuru's parents’ graves before Ai has to return to Japan. The following year, Nanoya gets married and everyone wonders if Ai and Yuzuru will get married. Ai says she understands Yuzuru's job in America is important to him and is content with a long-distance relationship. Shuuji questions Yuzuru about this and Yuzuru says he doesn't want to bring Ai to America and leave their mother alone. After spending the night together, Yuzuru tells Ai he will be staying in America for his job and Ai supports his decision. Their mother, who heard about the situation from Nanoya, confronts them, telling them to not give up their dreams for her and Yuzuru thanks her for raising him. A couple of years later, Ai and Yuzuru are happily married and living in America; Ai is still working as a baker, and Yuzuru has become a doctor. Shuuji is busy working and Nanoya is expecting her first child. Ai narrates how happy she is to have met Yuzuru because he is her true love.

== Characters ==
Ai Souda
The female protagonist. She is 14-year-old girl and a first year middle school student. She is Yuzuru's precious little sister. Ai is a sweet and innocent girl who is caring towards those dear to her, especially her older brother. After their parents' divorce when Ai was only 5, she longed to find Yuzuru again and almost didn't recognize him when he returned to Japan after a 9-year separation. Initially overjoyed to have her big brother back, Ai started to see Yuzuru less as a brother and more as a man, and gradually fell in love with him. Realizing how wrong her feelings were, she tried to resist them but couldn't help feel jealous as her friend, Nanayo, showed an interest in Yuzuru. After receiving her first kiss from him, Ai and Yuzuru confess their feelings to each other and tried to keep their relationship a secret. However, with their secret being discovered by their friends and mother who opposed them, Ai decided to break off the relationship on the condition that she become Yuzuru's lover, and loses her virginity to him. In a time-skip, Ai, in high school, agrees to an arranged marriage in order to forget Yuzuru. However, they find out they are not biologically related and are free to be together. Happy by this, Ai gets back together with Yuzuru, although they have a long-distant relationship due to Ai finishing high school in Japan and Yuzuru's job in America. In the final chapter, Yuzuru proposes to her and she accepts, and they are shown living happily together.
Yuzuru Souda
The male protagonist. He is 17-years-old and a high school student. He is Ai's beloved older brother. Yuzuru is kind, gentle, and modest towards his family and friends, and enjoys teasing Ai, as he is unable to resist her cuteness. After their parents' divorce, Yuzuru went to live with their father in America while Ai stayed with their mother in Japan, and they were never able to contact each other until 9 years later, after receiving his mother's blessing to see Ai. At first presenting himself as the protective and doting big brother, Yuzuru has always considered Ai to be the most important person in his life and is willing to do anything to see her happy. However, he starts to fall in love with Ai and is the first one to initiate a relationship with her by (accidentally) kissing her on the lips. After a while, they admit their feelings for each other and begin a secret relationship. As time went by, their closest friends find out, followed by their mother who refused to allow them to be together. After consummating their relationship, Yuzuru returned to America to move on, but finds a letter written to him from his father which reveals the truth about Yuzuru; he is not Ai's biological brother. His biological parents were siblings who fled from Japan to America. After they died in an accident, Mr. Souda took Yuzuru in and married his wife, who adopted Yuzuru. After this, he and Ai get back together, leading him to propose to her a couple of years later and they begin living together.
Nanayo Takeuchi
Ai's friend from school. She immediately takes an interest in Yuzuru and tries to get Ai to talk him into spending more time with her. This makes Ai jealous and sad, as she is also in love with Yuzuru. Nanayo is among the first people to find out about the relationship between the siblings and is against it. She becomes increasingly jealous at Ai that she ends their friendship and betrays both Ai and Yuzuru by telling mother about their relationship. However, after seeing Ai miserable from being apart from Yuzuru, Nanayo feels guilty and makes amends with them.
Shuuji Asahina
A classmate of Ai and Yuzuru, and he is best friends with Yuzuru. He has a crush on Ai and tries repeatedly to get her to go out with him. Ai, on the other hand, simply sees him as a dear friend, in addition to being in love with Yuzuru. Once Shuuji discovers the secret relationship between Ai and Yuzuru, he is disgusted and warns Yuzuru of the consequences of committing incest, as well as vowing to take Ai from him no matter what. However he sympathizes with Ai and tries to cover for her when her mother becomes suspicious.
Mrs. Souda
Ai and Yuzuru's mother. She raised Ai after divorcing her husband and had no contact with her son, due to her refusal to see her ex-husband. Upon remarrying her husband, she reunites with Yuzuru. She becomes suspicious of her children due to Nanoya leaking a photo of them kissing. Following the death of her husband, she is further distraught when she discovers the relationship and forbids them from being together. She later pressures Ai to go to college and get married. It is discovered that she is not Yuzuru’s mother; she adopted him after marrying her husband. Seeing how happy Ai is with Yuzuru, she allows them to be together.
Mr. Souda
Ai and Yuzuru's father. He raised Yuzuru after his divorce with his wife and had no contact with Ai because his ex-wife didn't want anything to do with him. Years later, he and Mrs. Souda remarried. Unknown to Ai and Yuzuru, he finds out about the relationship early on and instead of confronting them, he keeps quiet about it. He dies from a plane crash as he was returning to America for his job. After his death, he leaves a letter to Yuzuru that details his knowledge of the relationship, as well as revelations that he was best friends with Yuzuru's biological parents and knew they were siblings. After they died, he took custody of Yuzuru and raised him with his wife before Ai was born.

== Volumes ==
- 1 (May 24, 2013)
- 2 (September 26, 2013)
- 3 (December 26, 2013)
- 4 (April 25, 2014)
- 5 (June 26, 2014)
- 6 (October 24, 2014)
- 7 (March 26, 2015)

== Reception ==
Volume 2 reached the 40th place on the weekly Oricon manga charts and, as of September 29, 2013, had sold 33,158 copies; volume 3 reached the 36th place and, as of December 29, 2013, had sold 36,615 copies; volume 4 reached the 31st place and, as of April 27, 2014, had sold 31,071 copies; volume 5 reached the 27th place and, as of June 29, 2014, had sold 35,408 copies; volume 6 reached the 40th place and, as of November 2, 2014, had sold 55,129 copies and volume 7 reached the 22nd place and, as of April 5, 2015, had sold 62,096 copies.
