= Aurora Publishing (United States) =

American publishing company

Aurora Publishing, Inc.
- Industry: Publication
- Founded: Torrance, California (2006)
- Founder: Nobuo Kitawaki
- Fate: Folded in 2010
- Headquarters: Torrance, California, United States
- Area served: North America
- Key people: Nobuo Kitawaki (President)
- Owner: Ohzora Publishing
- Divisions: Aurora, Deux Press, Luv Luv Press
- Website: www.aurora-publishing.com

Aurora Publishing, Inc. was the American subsidiary of Japanese publisher Ohzora Publishing, the leading josei manga publisher in Japan. Headquartered in Torrance, California, it licensed and published Japanese manga for the North American market. Aurora Publishing's first release was Walkin' Butterfly under the shōjo imprint Aurora, which features manga targeting female readers in their teens and younger. Aurora Publishing also released manga under two other imprints: the yaoi imprint Deux Press featured female-oriented manga about homoerotic relations between beautiful men, while the josei imprint Luv Luv featured erotic romance manga targeting female readers in their late teens and up. Aurora Publishing distributed some of its manga via Netcomics. In 2010, the Aurora office in California closed. The former employees of Aurora Publishing went on to found Manga Factory. Manga Factory lasted until at least June 2013 before it closed as well.

== Publications ==
The following is a list of titles that was published by Aurora

Flock of Angels; Future Lovers; Hate to Love You; Heavenly Body; Hitohira; I Shall Never Return; Kiss All the Boys; Love For Dessert; Make Love & Peace; The Manzai Comics	Nephilim; Nightmares for Sale; Pretty Poison; Red Blinds the Foolish; Ruff Love; Seduce Me After the Show; Sounds of Love; Spring Fever; Walkin' Butterfly
