= Nephilim (manga) =

Japanese manga series

ネフィリム (Nefirimu)
- Genre: Fantasy, Gender-Bender
- Manga
- Written by: Anna Hanamaki
- Published by: Asahi Sonorama
- English publisher: NA: Aurora Publishing
- Magazine: Nemurenu Yoru no Kimyō na Hanashi
- Original run: 2004 – 2005
- Volumes: 2

Nephilim (Japanese: ネフィリム, Hepburn: Nefirimu) is a shōjo manga by Anna Hanamaki. It was serialized in Nemurenu Yoru no Kimyō na Hanashi from 2004 to 2005, with the individual chapters published in two tankōbon volumes by Asahi Sonorama.

It is licensed for an English language release in the United States by Aurora Publishing which began releasing the series in April 2008. The series follows a bounty hunter called Guy who meets Abel, from the tribe of the Nephilim who live as males during the day as females at night. After Guy learns Abel's secret, Abel is supposed to kill him by tribal law, but instead ends up falling in love.
