= Shio Satō =

Japanese manga artist (1952–2010)

Chiyoko "Shio" Satō (佐藤 史生, Satō Shio) (6 December 1952 (Note: A recent book edited by Anasawa et al. (2024) says that Satō was born in 6 December 1950. It also includes a detailed chronicle of Satō's life and works, in which the time schedule of her early life is different from the conventional understandings that she was born in 1952.) – 4 April 2010) was a Japanese manga artist. Satō is often regarded as a member of the Post Year 24 Group, a group of female manga artists considered influential in the development of shōjo manga. She wrote under the pen name Shio Satō – as her surname Satō had the same pronunciation as satō (砂糖, sugar), she combined it with shio (塩, salt), with the kanji form modified as 史生. She made her professional debut in 1977 with the publication of "Koi wa Ajina Mono!?" in Bessatsu Shōjo Comic (Shogakukan). Her definitive works include Yumemiru Wakusei (The Dreaming Planet) and One Zero.

Her stories were usually serious science fiction (SF) drawn in a "subdued" style. Satō regards her interest in science fiction from the patience and thorough answers of her father when she was young and asking "Why?" to everything. Her science fiction influences include Isaac Asimov, Cordwainer Smith and James Tiptree Jr. A major influence on her work Yumemiru Wakusei (1980–1984) was the film Lawrence of Arabia.

Her another focus was on Asian myths, animism, and traditional arts like masks and statues of gods. The first publication featuring these elements was "Yume Kui" (Dream Eater) in 1982. Satō further widened her perspective to integrate these elements into SF. In One Zero (1984–1986), she depicted future technologies such as artificial intelligence encountering the endless war between Buddhist and anti-Buddhist gods.

In spite of the small number of publications and no adaptation to other media, Satō's manga works have a devoted fan base. Her works mostly appeared on shōjo manga magazines such as Bessatsu Shōjo Comic, Petit Flower (Shogakukan), and Grape Fruit (Shinshokan). "The Changeling", an SF short story published on Petit Flower in 1989, is her only story translated in English to this day. In addition to being published in the English-language anthology Four Shōjo Stories, it was serialised in Animerica in 1995 (Vol.3 issues 5 and 6).

== Biography ==
She wrote her first manga story when she was a second-grade student at a high school of Miyagi Prefecture, referring to Shotaro Ishinomori's introductory books published in 1965 and 1966. She later told about the direct influence from Hoshi no Tategoto by Hideko Mizuno, which had been her "starting point".

After graduating from high school, Satō moved to Tokyo and worked for a printing company. She became an assistant to Moto Hagio and Keiko Takemiya in 1972. In those days, these two new star manga artists were frequently visited by many people including young manga artists, both professional and amateur, from all over Japan. Satō improved techniques of writing manga and broaden her network there. Yasuko Sakata offered opportunities to include Satō's earliest SF manga stories in her offset-printing doujinshi circulation. An editor from Shogakukan saw Satō's unfinished SF story "Hoshi no Oka yori" (From the Star Hill) and encouraged her to finish it. It then won her the 11th newcomer award of Bessatsu Shōjo Comic competition in 1976. She made her debut in the magazine in the following year, with another comical non-SF daily story. Even after that, she continued to work as an assistant to Hagio and Takemiya until the demands of her own works prevented her from doing so.

The 1980s was her most productive period. In addition to the series of Yumemiru Wakusei in 1980–1984, Shiseru Ōjo no Tame no Pavane (Pavane for a Dead Princess) in 1981–1982, and One Zero in 1984–1986, she wrote masterpieces such as "Raryō-Ō" (The Prince of Lanling) in 1985, "Moon Child" in 1986, and "Changeling" in 1989. Amidst the busy situation, she started collaborative work with Mei Tokunaga. Between 1985 and 1989, they jointly produced five stories including Seirei-Ō (The King of Spirits).

Her last publication was Majutsushi Sagashi (Wizard Hunt) on Petit Flower in 2000. In 2001, Satō was hospitalized due to breast cancer. Although once recovered, she created no new work then. Satō died from brain cancer in Kiyose, Tokyo, on 4 April 2010, aged 57. (Note: Newspapers reported Satō had died at age 59, which is consistent with the argument that she was born in December 1950. Nevertheless, even if we assume Satō's birth was in 1952, the two-year discrepancy could be understood as derived from the traditional Japanese system of age reckoning.)

== Works ==
=== Serial works and tankōbon ===
Most of Satō's works were a short story with four or fewer episodes. They were compiled into a book (so-called tankōbon), often bundled with other short stories. Exceptions were two long series of Yumemiru Wakusei and One Zero, each of which had 21 episodes and was compiled into four volumes of tankōbon.

- Kinseiju (金星樹) (1979, Kisōtengaisha): Tankōbon of five short stories including "Kinseiju" (1978), "Legion" (1978), and "Hoshi no Oka yori" (1977).
  - Kinseiju (1992, Shinchosha): Reprint plus another story "Aoi Inu" (1977).
- Haru o Yumemishi (春を夢見し) (1980, Shinshokan): Tankōbon of six short stories including "Midnight Fever" (1979), "Koi wa Ajina Mono!?" (1977), and "Haru o Yumemishi" (1978).
- Yumemiru Wakusei (夢みる惑星) (1980–1984, serialized in Petit Flower, Shogakukan)
  - Tankōbon in four volumes (1982–1984, Shogakukan).
- Shiseru Ōjo no Tame no Pavane (死せる王女のための孔雀舞) (1981–1982, serialized in Grape Fruit, Shinshokan)
  - Tankōbon (1983, Shinshokan) includes "Yume Kui" (1982).
- Kono Mazushiki Chijō ni (この貧しき地上に) (1982–1984, serialized in Grape Fruit, Shinshokan)
  - Tankōbon (1985, Shinshokan) includes "Omae no Yasashii Te de" (1983).
- Ahōsen (阿呆船) (1984, Shinshokan): Tankōbon of "Ahōsen" (1980) inspired by Ship of Fools by Sebastian Brant, its sequel stories, and another short piece.
- One Zero (ワン・ゼロ) (1984–1986, serialized in Petit Flower, Shogakukan)
  - Tankōbon in 4 volumes (1985–1986, Shogakukan)
- Datenraku (打天楽) (1987, Shogakukan): Tankōbon of "Datenraku" (a spin-off story of One Zero), "Moon Child" (1986), and its sequel story "Daen Kidō Rhapsody" (1986).
- Yadorigi (やどり木) (1987, serialized in Grape Fruit, Shinshokan)
  - Tankōbon (1988, Shinshokan) includes "Masaka no Toki no Harlequin Romance" (1986) and "Banana Trip ni Sairyō no Hi" (1985).
- Raryō-Ō (羅陵王) (1988, Hakusensha): Tankōbon of "Raryō-Ō" (1985), "Emerald Garden" (1987), and two joint works with Mei Tokunaga ("Aleph" in 1985 and "Taopi" in 1987).
- Changeling (チェンジリング) (1989, Shogakukan): Tankōbon of five short stories including "Changeling" (1989), its sequel story "Nepenthes" (1989), and "Ophelia Sagashi" (1989, with Mei Tokunaga).
- Seirei-Ō (精霊王) (1989, Shogakukan): Tankōbon of two joint works with Mei Tokunaga ("Seirei-Ō" in 1988 and "Asylum" in 1989) and an essay by Satō.
- Oni Ou Mono (鬼追うもの) (1994–1995, serialized in Petit Flower, Shogakukan)
  - Tankōbon (1995, Shogakukan): "Oni Ou Mono" (1994) and its sequel story "Kami Yarai" (1995).
- Shinzō no Nai Kyojin (心臓のない巨人) (1998–1999, serialized in Petit Flower, Shogakukan)
  - Tankōbon (1999, Shogakukan) includes "Babylon made Nan Mile" (1997).
- Majutsushi Sagashi (魔術師さがし) (2000, serialized in Petit Flower, Shogakukan)
  - Tankōbon (2000, Shogakukan): "Majutsushi Sagashi", its spin-off story, and another short story "Maru Ta no Onna" (Note: "Maru Ta" is for the special character of a hiragana "た" (ta) placed within a circle "○" (maru).) (1988).

=== Bunkobon reprint ===
- Yumemiru Wakusei (1996, Shogakukan) in three volumes.
- One Zero (1996, Shogakukan) in three volumes.
- Datenraku (2001, Shogakukan): In addition to the three stories included in the tankōbon edition of Datenraku, the bunkobon edition contains "Yume Kui", "Changeling", and "Nepenthes".
- Seirei-Ō (with Mei Tokunaga) (2001, Shogakukan): five stories that Satō and Tokunaga jointly produced.
- Tenkai no Shiro (天界の城) (2001, Hayakawa Shobo): "Ahōsen", its sequel stories, "Raryō-Ō", and "Yadorigi".

=== Illustration book ===
- Ryū no Yume, Sonota no Yume (竜の夢 その他の夢) (1984, Shinshokan): collection of illustrations for Yumemiru Wakusei, additional short stories, and interviews.

=== Special edition ===
After the author's death, Fukkan Dot Com published special edition books under the series of "Satō Shio Collection", between 2012 and 2016.

- Shiseru Ōjo no Tame no Pavane (2012, Fukkan Dot Com): ISBN 4-8354-4825-1
- Kinseiju (2012, Fukkan Dot Com): ISBN 4-8354-4847-2
- Kono Mazushiki Chijō ni (2012, Fukkan Dot Com): ISBN 4-8354-4903-7
- Ryū no Yume, Sonota no Yume (2013, Fukkan Dot Com): ISBN 4-8354-4916-9
- Haru o Yumemishi (2013, Fukkan Dot Com): ISBN 4-8354-4996-7
- Yadorigi (2014, Fukkan Dot Com): ISBN 4-8354-4999-1
- Yumemiru Wakusei: Aizōban (2014, Fukkan Dot Com) in 4 volumes: ISBN 4-8354-5079-5, 4-8354-5080-9, 4-8354-5081-7, 4-8354-5082-5
- One Zero: Aizōban (2015, Fukkan Dot Com) in 4 volumes: ISBN 4-8354-5250-X, 4-8354-5251-8, 4-8354-5252-6, 4-8354-5253-4
- Datenraku (2016, Fukkan Dot Com): ISBN 4-8354-5292-5

=== Anthologies ===
These are anthology works in which one or more stories by Satō appeared:

- New Fantasy Comic World (ニュー・ファンタジー・コミックの世界) (1982, Sanrio): the first publication of "Yume Kui".
- Masuyama, Norie (ed.) Alice Book I (アリス・ブックI) (1991, Shinchosha): the first publication of "Ryū no Himegimi", a sequel story of Yumemiru Wakusei.
- Masuyama, Norie (ed.) Alice Book II (アリス・ブックII) (1991, Shinchosha): Re-publication of "Ame no Ryū", another sequel story of Yumemiru Wakusei.
- Four Shōjo Stories (1996, Viz Media): including English translation of "Changeling".
- Yume Kui: Satō Shio Materpieces (夢喰い: 佐藤史生傑作短編集) (2024, Kawade Shobō Shinsha): collection of eight short stories.
- Satō Shio: Shojo Manga ga Yumemita Mirai (総特集 佐藤史生: 少女マンガが夢見た未来) (2024, Kawade Shobō Shinsha): including Satō's two short stories, illustrations, biography, bibliography, interviews, and contributions from those who were familiar with Satō.

Satō also edited a manga anthology book and contributed a short story "Emerald Garden" for it.

- Satō, Shio (ed.) Kisshō Kajin (吉祥花人) (1987, Hakusensha).
