= Mellow Mellow =

Japanese idol girl group

- Origin: Japan
- Genres: J-pop
- Years active: 2017–2024
- Labels: I Blue
- Members: Sena; Mami; Hina
- Website: mellowmellow.jp

Mellow Mellow was a Japanese idol girl group formed in 2017. They released their debut single, "Girls Hour", in December 2017. Their disbandment was announced in November 2024, and their final concert will be held in June 2025.

== History ==
Prior to debuting in Mellow Mellow, Sena and Mami were members of Sunmyu. The group debuted on December 6, 2017, with the single "Girls Hour". They made their major label debut with their second single, "Magic Rendezvous", on June 20, 2018. Their third single, "Kimi ni Tap", was released on December 19, 2018. On April 10, 2019, they released their fourth single "Dear My Star", followed by their fifth single "Waning Moon" on October 2. Their sixth single, "Saikō Kessaku", was released on July 29, 2020. On November 15, 2024, Mellow Mellow disbanded. They held their final concert in June 2025.

== Discography ==
=== Singles ===
Title	Year	Peak chart positions	Album
Title	Year	Oricon	Album
"Girls Hour" (ガールズアワー)	2017	103	Non-album singles
"Magic Rendezvous" (マジックランデブー)	2018	29	Non-album singles
"Kimi ni Tap" (君にタップ)	2018	25	Non-album singles
"Dear My Star"	2019	21	Non-album singles
"Waning Moon"	2019	15	Non-album singles
"Saikō Kessaku" (最高傑作)	2020	19	Non-album singles
