= Heavenly Body (manga) =

Manga written by Takashi Kanzaki

- English cover of Heavenly Body

HHリミックス (HH Rimikkusu)
- Genre: Yaoi
- Manga
- Written by: Takashi Kanzaki
- Published by: Daitosha
- English publisher: NA: Aurora Publishing
- Published: October 2003

Heavenly Body (Japanese: HHリミックス, Hepburn: HH Rimikkusu) is a yaoi manga anthology by Takashi Kanzaki and published by Daitosha. It is licensed in English by Aurora Publishing, which released the manga in August 2008.

== Reception ==
Katharine Farmar, writing for Comics Village, felt that the war between Heaven and Hell was a refreshing take on the typical love triangle story. Farmar was disappointed that the third supernatural being assigned to Hazumi's case also fell for Hazumi so quickly, finding it a little unrealistic. Farmar preferred the backup stories in the anthology. N.S. Davidson, writing for Sequential Tart, was discomfited by "A Ballad For You", about "a man putting up with his sadistic lover", and enjoyed "Beloved" as it is about a healthier relationship. Isaac Hale, writing for PopCultureShock, described the art as "attractive and sexy", but found the plot of the title story "terrible". Hale felt that "A Ballad For You" was "head and shoulders" above "Heavenly Body", as the character designs were "sexier" and it had a more "intelligible plot". Hale found the last oneshot, "Beloved", a "pleasure to read", but felt that on the whole he "could not recommend" Heavenly Body.
