= Future Lovers (manga) =

Japanese manga series

- First volume, English edition

未来の記憶 (Mirai no Kioku)
- Genre: Romantic comedy, Drama, Yaoi
- Manga
- Written by: Saika Kunieda
- Published by: Biblos
- English publisher: NA: Aurora Publishing
- Original run: 2002 – 2004
- Volumes: 2

Future Lovers (Japanese: 未来の記憶, Hepburn: Mirai no Kioku) is a yaoi manga series by Saika Kunieda. The first volume was published in Japan under the Japanese title "未来の記憶" in 2002 by Biblos. The second volume was published in Japan under the Japanese title Kaze no Yukue ("風の行方") in 2004 by Biblos. Libre Shuppan reprinted both volumes into one complete collected volume titled Mirai no Kioku/Kaze no Yukue ("未来の記憶/風の行方") in 2008. Aurora Publishing licensed the series for an English language release in North America in 2008. Aurora released both volumes under their yaoi manga imprint "Deux Press" as a two volume series under the title Future Lovers. The first volume was published in September 2008, and the second volume was published in March 2009. The English release contains an unrelated story by the same author, Winter Rabbit.

== Plot ==
Kento is a conventional, straightforward, and pretty much boring 26 years old high school teacher quickly on his way towards "geezer-hood" as he thinks to himself, "young people these days..." To make matters worse, his girlfriend rejects his once in a lifetime marriage proposal because he frames it in a way that makes it seem that he is only after a housekeeper and baby machine. He then gets drunk and goes home with a man, who turns out to be a new teacher at Kento's school.

Thus enters Akira, a dangerously reckless man with a perpetual evil smirk, a ridiculously flamboyant sense of style, drop-dead gorgeous looks, an endlessly annoying personality and a libido that just keeps going and going. Despite Kento's previous dream of family and Akira's fear of abandonment, the two continue their relationship over a period of three years.

== Reception ==
Casey Brienza, writing for Graphic Novel Reporter, felt that Future Lovers was one of Kunieda's best works, and that it would attract a wider readership than only BL fans, due to the "real" and adult characterizations, and the "message of tolerance and self-acceptance", which Brienza regards as being rare in BL works. Catherine Farmar, writing for Comics Village, enjoyed the main story of the work, but was affronted that there was no warning that Winter Rabbit was an incest story. Michelle Smith, writing for PopCultureShock, initially felt the circular arguments between the main characters were a flaw in the writing, but then realized that this was actually a realistic portrayal of a relationship. She also enjoyed the humor of the work and the strong characterizations, feeling that the story was more slice of life showing a relationship than a romance. David Welsh, writing for The Comics Reporter, enjoyed the balance in the story between "life issues and love issues", and found Winter Rabbit "pedestrian" when compared to the title story.
