= Ohzora Publishing =

Japanese publishing company

Ohzora Publishing, Inc. 株式会社宙出版
- Type: Kabushiki gaisha
- Founded: January 10, 1990
- Headquarters: Tokyo, Japan
- Key people: Nobuo Kitawaki (President)
- Revenue: 35 billion yen
- Net income: 35,000,000 yen
- Number of employees: 67
- Subsidiaries: Aurora Publishing
- Website: ohzora.jp

Ohzora Publishing, Inc. (宙出版), also known as Ohzora Shuppan is a josei manga publisher in Japan, founded in 1990. Headquartered in Tokyo, Japan, it publishes Japanese manga, manga magazines and comic anthologies. The company is headed by Nobuo Kitawaki (北脇信夫). Kitawaki also ran affiliated American company Aurora Publishing, established in 2006 before it closed in 2010. Aurora Publishing was the U.S. subsidiary of Ohzora.

== Magazines published ==
- Ren'ai Hakusho Pastel
- Coi-Haru

=== Defunct magazines ===
- Lady's comic I
  - Lady's comic Aya
  - Lady's comic Scandal!
  - Lady's comic secret
  - Lady's comic Misui
  - Lady's Comic Special AYA
- Cool-B
  - Cool-B Sweet Princess
- Harmony Prince
- Le Noel
- Honey Romance (formerly Harlequin and Harmony Romance)
- P-mate
- Ren'ai Hakusho Sherry Kiss (formerly Patchtel)
  - Ren'ai Hakusho Gold
  - Ren'ai Hakusho Start
- Young Love Comic aya
- Bessatsu Harmony Romance (formerly marié)
- Ren'ai Revolution
- Shiawase na Kekkon
- Gokinjo no Kowai Uwasa
- SweetSweet Princess
- Hontou ni Kowai Yome Shuutome
- Wideshow no Onnatachi
- Hana girl! Bessatsu Next F (formerly Harmony PRINCE)
