= Bokura ga Ita (film) =

- Film poster advertising this film in Japan
- Directed by: Takahiro Miki
- Story by: Yuki Obata (Bokura ga Ita)
- Produced by: Tomoko Yoshida
- Starring: Toma Ikuta, Yuriko Yoshitaka
- Production companies: Amuse; Asmik Ace Entertainment; Enterbrain; Hakuhodo DY Media Partners; J Storm; Shogakukan; Toho; Toho Pictures
- Distributed by: Toho & Asmik Ace Entertainment (Japan); Capcom Pictures (USA)
- Release dates: 17 March 2012 (Part 1); 21 April 2012 (Part 2)
- Country: Japan
- Language: Japanese
- Box office: $19.7 million (Part 1) $15.1 million (Part 2)

Bokura ga Ita (僕等がいた) is a 2012 Japanese film based on the manga of the same name, We Were There written by Yūki Obata. It is directed by the director Takahiro Miki and stars Toma Ikuta, Yuriko Yoshitaka. The film was released in two parts, with the first released in Japanese cinemas on 17 March 2012, and the second part was released on 21 April 2012.

== Cast ==
- Toma Ikuta as Motoharu Yano
- Yuriko Yoshitaka as Nanami Takahashi
- Sosuke Takaoka as Masafumi Takeuchi
- Yuika Motokariya as Yuri Yamamoto
- Ayaka Komatsu as Nana

== Production ==
Bokura ga Ita was first serialized in Betsucomi, and it won the 50th Shogakukan Manga Award for Shōjo manga. Director Takahiro Miki directed the film, and film produced by Tomoko Yoshida.

The main cast of Bokura ga Ita was revealed on 2 May 2011. Toma Ikuta, who previously starred in the films Hanamizuki and No Longer Human, would be starring in this film as Motoharu Yano, a boy who is popular with most girls in the class. Actress Yuriko Yoshitaka, the recipient of the Best Newcomer award at the 28th Yokohama Film Festival, would star as Nanami Takahashi, a classmate of Motoharu. In addition, Sosuke Takaoka would play the role of Masafumi Takeuchi, Yano's close friend, and Yuika Motokariya would play Yuri Yamamoto, the younger sister of Motoharu's late girlfriend.

The filming of Bokura ga Ita took place in Kushiro, Hokkaido. This is the hometown of Yuki Obata, the manga artist of Bokura ga Ita, the manga this film is based on. The filming began in May 2011. The film was filmed in Sapporo, Hokkaido and in Tokyo.
