= QQ Sweeper =

Japanese shōjo manga series

- The cover of the first volume.

QQ スイーパー (キューキュースイーパー) (Kyūkyū Suīpā)
- Genre: Dark fantasy, romance, supernatural
- Manga
- Written by: Kyousuke Motomi
- Published by: Shogakukan
- English publisher: NA: Viz Media
- Magazine: Betsucomi
- Original run: 13 March 2014 – 13 May 2015
- Volumes: 3
- Manga

Queen's Quality
- Written by: Kyousuke Motomi
- Published by: Shogakukan
- English publisher: NA: Viz Media
- Magazine: Betsucomi
- Original run: 13 July 2015 – 11 April 2025
- Volumes: 25

QQ Sweeper (QQ スイーパー(キューキュースイーパー), Kyūkyū Suīpā) is a Japanese manga series written and illustrated by Kyousuke Motomi. It was serialized in Shogakukan's shōjo manga magazine Betsucomi from March 2014 to May 2015. A sequel, titled Queen's Quality (クイーンズ・クオリティ, Kuīnzu Kuoriti), was serialized in the same magazine from July 2015 to April 2025.

Both series are published in North America by Viz Media.

== Plot ==
Sixteen-year-old Fumi Nishioka is a homeless high school girl suffering from amnesia, often spending her nights in a secret unused room of the school. Despite having no memories, she chooses a positive outlook on life and is determined to find her "Prince Charming" in the future. One day however, she is found by Kyutaro Horikita, an unfriendly second-year student with a talent for cleaning, and is drawn into a mysterious door in the room through her classmate and delinquent Sakaguchi's voice calling for help. The door leads to the Void, a gateway linking thousands of people's minds, one of which is Sakaguchi's. Sakaguchi, who has been plagued by negative emotions and created a bug infestation in his mind, is cleansed by Kyutaro, who arrives just in time to save Fumi.

The school's chairman and Kyutaro's brother-in-law, Koichi Kitagawa, recognises Fumi's talent and decides to invite her as part of their family, explaining the situation to her. The Horikita family are "Sweepers", people who enter the mind vaults of others to cleanse their souls of bug infestations that are the result of uncontrollable negative emotions. As Fumi undergoes training to become a Sweeper and Kyutaro's partner, she stumbles upon an extraordinary power lying dormant inside her: the "Queen", a rare existence that can allow the bearer to have mind control over others. However, the Queen's power can be both evil and good, and some people are out to find her and capture her for their own deeds. Struggling with her training and romantic feelings for Kyutaro, Fumi attempts to search for an answer in her own soul and lost memories.

== Characters ==
Kyutaro Horikita (堀北玖太郎, Horikita Kyūtarō)
Voiced by: Soma Saito (drama CD)
A "sweeper", or someone who exorcises malignant spirits created by troubled minds.
Fumi Nishioka (西岡 文, Nishioka Fumi)
Voiced by: Miyu Takagi (drama CD)
A homeless girl who begins to assist Kyutaro after encountering him at school.

== Release ==
Written and illustrated by Kyousuke Motomi, QQ Sweeper was serialized in Shogakukan's shōjo manga magazine Betsucomi from 13 March 2014 to 13 May 2015. A sequel, titled Queen's Quality, was serialized in the same magazine from 13 July 2015 to 11 April 2025.

Viz Media announced their license to the series on 6 February 2015, with plans to begin publishing it under their Shojo Beat imprint in October 2015. They announced their license to the sequel at Otakon in August 2016.

=== Volumes ===
No.	Original release date	Original ISBN	English release date	English ISBN
1	26 September 2014	978-4-09-136316-9	6 October 2015	978-1-4215-8214-6
2	26 February 2015	978-4-09-136819-5	2 February 2016	978-1-4215-8393-8
3	24 July 2015	978-4-09-137628-2	7 June 2016	978-1-4215-8633-5

==== Queen's Quality ====
No.	Original release date	Original ISBN	English release date	English ISBN
1	26 January 2016	978-4-09-138280-1	5 September 2017	978-1-4215-9244-2
2	24 June 2016	978-4-09-138378-5	5 December 2017	978-1-4215-9508-5
3	25 November 2016	978-4-09-138697-7	6 March 2018	978-1-4215-9590-0
4	24 March 2017	978-4-09-139169-8	5 June 2018	978-1-4215-9859-8
5	26 October 2017	978-4-09-139716-4	4 September 2018	978-1-9747-0134-6
6	26 March 2018	978-4-09-139850-5	4 December 2018	978-1-9747-0399-9
7	24 August 2018	978-4-09-870138-4	4 June 2019	978-1-9747-0788-1
8	26 February 2019	978-4-09-870336-4	3 December 2019	978-1-9747-0959-5
9	26 June 2019	978-4-09-870448-4	2 June 2020	978-1-9747-1117-8
10	25 October 2019	978-4-09-870632-7	1 December 2020	978-1-9747-1731-6
11	26 February 2020	978-4-09-870754-6	2 March 2021	978-1-9747-2073-6
12	26 August 2020	978-4-09-871061-4	6 July 2021	978-1-9747-2306-5
13	25 December 2020	978-4-09-871158-1	7 December 2021	978-1-9747-2509-0
14	26 April 2021	978-4-09-871302-8	5 April 2022	978-1-9747-2788-9
15	24 September 2021	978-4-09-871395-0	6 September 2022	978-1-9747-3242-5
16	24 December 2021	978-4-09-871552-7	3 January 2023	978-1-9747-3434-4
17	26 May 2022	978-4-09-871663-0	2 May 2023	978-1-9747-3694-2
18	26 September 2022	978-4-09-871704-0	7 November 2023	978-1-9747-4049-9
19	24 February 2023	978-4-09-871868-9	4 June 2024	978-1-9747-4566-1
20	26 June 2023	978-4-09-872098-9	5 November 2024	978-1-9747-4910-2
21	26 October 2023	978-4-09-872366-9	4 February 2025	978-1-9747-5193-8
22	26 March 2024	978-4-09-872491-8	6 May 2025	978-1-9747-5495-3
23	25 July 2024	978-4-09-872664-6	5 August 2025	978-1-9747-5558-5
24	25 December 2024	978-4-09-872796-4	2 December 2025	978-1-9747-5818-0
25	26 May 2025	978-4-09-873058-2	5 May 2026	978-1-9747-6339-9

== Reception ==
Queen's Quality was nominated for the 67th Shogakukan Manga Award in the shōjo category in 2022.

Reviewing the first volume of QQ Sweeper for Anime News Network, Rebecca Silverman gave it a grade of B. She wrote that the while series "doesn't do a whole lot to distinguish itself or give us any major surprises, it is still a very enjoyable read filled with the humor and small romantic elements that Motomi does so well". She noted that "it feels as if Motomi can't quite decide who is the point of view character. While there is no problem in manga with having more than one, the shifts here feel abrupt". She was positive toward the series' art, commenting "Motomi's art is more refined than in Dengeki Daisy while still retaining her sharp look". She concluded by writing that the series "isn't off to an amazing start, but it is a solid one that looks like it will build to Motomi's usual heights".
