= Seirō Opera =

Japanese manga series

- First tankōbon volume cover

青楼オペラ
- Genre: Historical, romance
- Manga
- Written by: Kanoko Sakurakoji
- Published by: Shogakukan
- Imprint: Flower Comics
- Magazine: Betsucomi
- Original run: January 13, 2015 – November 13, 2019
- Volumes: 12

Seirō Opera (青楼オペラ) is a Japanese manga series written and illustrated by Kanoko Sakurakoji. It was serialized in Shogakukan's shōjo manga magazine Betsucomi from January 2015 to November 2019.

== Plot ==
Set in the Edo period, the series focuses on Akane, a samurai's daughter who after losing her parents is sold to a brothel in the Yoshiwara red-light district. Akane trains in order to become a courtesan, and later gets involved with a mysterious man named Sōsuke Ōmiya.

== Publication ==
Written and illustrated by Kanoko Sakurakoji, Seirō Opera was serialized in Shogakukan's shōjo manga magazine Betsucomi from January 13, 2015, to November 13, 2019. Its chapters were collected in twelve tankōbon volumes released from October 26, 2015, to February 26, 2020.

No.	Release date	ISBN
1	October 26, 2015	978-4-09-137777-7
2	October 26, 2015	978-4-09-137778-4
3	March 25, 2016	978-4-09-138309-9
4	July 22, 2016	978-4-09-138477-5
5	December 26, 2016	978-4-09138477-5
6	May 26, 2017	978-4-09-139187-2
7	September 26, 2017	978-4-09-139567-2
8	March 26, 2018	978-4-09-139868-0
9	August 24, 2018	978-4-09-870103-2
10	February 26, 2019	978-4-09-870331-9
11	August 26, 2019	978-4-09-870524-5
12	February 26, 2020	978-4-09-870758-4

== Reception ==
The series was nominated for the 65th Shogakukan Manga Award in the shōjo category.
