= Diary of a Female Lead: Shujinkou Nikki =

Japanese manga series

- First tankōbon volume cover

主人恋日記 (Shujinkō Nikki)
- Genre: Romance
- Manga
- Written by: Yuu Yoshinaga
- Published by: Shogakukan
- English publisher: NA: Seven Seas Entertainment
- Imprint: Flower Comics
- Magazine: Betsucomi
- Original run: August 12, 2021 – May 13, 2025
- Volumes: 12

Diary of a Female Lead: Shujinkou Nikki (主人恋日記, Shujinkō Nikki) is a Japanese manga series written and illustrated by Yuu Yoshinaga. It was serialized in Shogakukan's shojo manga magazine Betsucomi from August 2021 to May 2025.

== Synopsis ==
Aoi Tsujimura has an inferiority complex especially when compared with her shōjo mangaka mother and her older brother Itsuki, who is an athlete, and a low self-esteem, as a result she often feels lonely. Due to this, Itsuki decides to interfere in Aoi's life and brings in his classmate Sena Mizusawa to freshen Aoi's life.

== Characters ==
Aoi Tsujimura (辻村葵, Tsujimura Aoi)
Voiced by: Saori Hayami (voice comic)
Sena Mizusawa (水沢世那, Mizusawa Sena)
Voiced by: Yoshimasa Hosoya (voice comic)

== Media ==
=== Manga ===
Written and illustrated by Yuu Yoshinaga, Diary of a Female Lead: Shujinkou Nikki was serialized in Shogakukan's shōjo manga magazine Betsucomi from August 12, 2021, to May 13, 2025. Its chapters were compiled into twelve tankōbon volumes released from December 24, 2021, to January 26, 2026. The series is licensed in English by Seven Seas Entertainment.

No.	Original release date	Original ISBN	English release date	English ISBN
1	December 24, 2021	978-4-09-871480-3	October 22, 2024	979-8-89160-226-7
Chapters 1–4
2	April 26, 2022	978-4-09-871660-9	January 21, 2025	979-8-89160-227-4
Chapters 5–8
3	August 26, 2022	978-4-09-871703-3	May 13, 2025	979-8-89160-550-3
Chapters 9–12; Bonus
4	March 24, 2023	978-4-09-871785-9	September 9, 2025	979-8-89160-551-0
Chapters 13–16; Bonus
5	May 25, 2023	978-4-09-872096-5	January 13, 2026	979-8-89373-612-0
Chapters 17–20; Bonus
6	September 26, 2023	978-4-09-872236-5	April 14, 2026	979-8-89373-613-7
Chapters 21–24; Bonus
7	January 26, 2024	978-4-09-872476-5	August 11, 2026	979-8-89561-353-5
Chapters 25–28; Bonus
8	May 24, 2024	978-4-09-872579-3	December 8, 2026	979-8-89561-354-2
9	September 26, 2024	978-4-09-872667-7	April 27, 2027	979-8-89765-599-1
10	February 26, 2025	978-4-09-872889-3	—	—
11	June 26, 2025	978-4-09-873056-8; 978-4-09-943203-4 (SE)	—	—
12	January 26, 2026	978-4-09-873310-1; 978-4-09-943224-9 (SE)	—	—

=== Other ===
A voice comic adaptation was published in the July 2023 issue of Betsucomi on June 13, 2023. The voice comic is also available on the Flower Comics YouTube channel. The voice comic consisted of performances by Saori Hayami and Yoshimasa Hosoya.

== Reception ==
The series had over 3.1 million copies in circulation by February 2025.

The series was nominated for the 69th Shogakukan Manga Awards in 2023.
