= Kyousuke Motomi =

Japanese manga artist

- Occupation: Manga artist
- Years active: 2002–present

Kyousuke Motomi (最富 キョウスケ, Motomi Kyōsuke) is a Japanese manga artist whose stories have frequently been published in the monthly Betsucomi magazine. Her most current work is Yaoyorozu Toriatsukai Setsumeisho.

Though Motomi uses a male pseudonym and draws herself as a man, she is actually female, as pictured in the May 2010 issue of Betsucomi.

== List of works ==
Manga	Role	Magazine	Original Run
Yaoyorozu Toriatsukai Setsumeisho	Story & Art	Betsucomi	2026–present
Queen's Quality	Story & Art	Betsucomi	2015–2025
QQ Sweeper	Story & Art	Betsucomi	2014–2015
Dengeki Daisy	Story & Art	Betsucomi	2007–2014
Beast Master	Story & Art	Betsucomi	2007
Seishun Survival	Story & Art	Betsucomi	2006
Purikyuu	Story & Art	Betsucomi	2005
BITTER II	Story & Art	Betsucomi	2004
Otokomae! Beads Club	Story & Art	Betsucomi	2004
Penguin Prince	Story & Art	Betsucomi	2003
No-Good Cupid	Story & Art	Deluxe Betsucomi	2002
