= Yūki Obata =

Japanese manga artist (born 1962)

- 小畑友紀
- Pronunciation: おばた ゆうき
- Born: January 9, 1962 (age 64); Hokkaido, Japan
- Occupation: Manga artist
- Years active: 1998-present
- Notable work: We Were There (manga)
- Awards: Shogakukan Manga Award (2004)

Yūki Obata (小畑友紀, おばた ゆうき, Obata Yuuki) (born January 9, 1962) is a Japanese manga artist born in Hokkaido, Japan. She is mainly known for her work We Were There (僕等がいた, Bokura ga Ita).

== Career ==
In 1998, Obata made her debut with Rain Drops published in the Shogakukan's magazine Deluxe Separate Volume Shojo Comic. Since her debut, Obata's works are primarily published in Shogakukan's Betsucomi.

In 2002, We Were There began serialization in Bestucomi, eventually becoming her most popular work with over 10 million volumes in circulation. An anime adaption of the work was released in 2006, followed by a live-action film in 2012.

From July 31 to September 5, 2010, an exhibition of Obata's original art was held on the second floor of JR Kushiro Station in Hokkaido. Exhibitions of Obata's original artwork from We Were There were also held in Sapporo and Tokyo from March to April 2012.

== Works ==
- Rain Drops (1998) – one-shot in Shogakukan's Bessatsu Shōjo Comic
- Kimi no Kachi (きみの勝ち) (2000) – one-shot in Bessatsu Shōjo Comic
- Suki, Kirai, Suki (スキキライ好き) (2000) – serialized in Bessatsu Shōjo Comic, 1 volume published
- Maru Sankaku Shikaku (まる三角しかく) (2000-2001) – 2 volumes published
- Sumire wa Blue (スミレはブルー) (2001-2002) – serialized in Bessatsu Shōjo Comic, then Betsucomi, 2 volumes published
- We Were There (僕等がいた, Bokura ga Ita) (2002-2012) – serialized in Betsucomi, 16 volumes published
- Haru Meguru (春巡る) (2012-2014 hiatus) – serialized in Shueisha's Cookie, 2 volumes published

== Awards ==
In 1998, Obata won a Shogakukan Award Honorable Mention in the New Mangaka category for the one-shot Rain Drops. In 2004, We Were There won the 50th Shogakukan Manga Award in the shoujo category, tied with Sand Chronicles by Hinako Ashihara.
