= Kaneyoshi Izumi =

Japanese manga artist

Kaneyoshi Izumi 和泉 かねよし
- Born: April 1
- Area: Manga artist
- Notable works: Sonnanja neyo; Joō no Hana
- Awards: Shogakukan Shinjin Comic Award; 1995 "Tenshi"; Shogakukan Manga Award; 2006 Sonnanja neyo 2015 Joō no Hana

Kaneyoshi Izumi (和泉 かねよし, Izumi Kaneyoshi; born April 1) is a Japanese manga artist. Her debut short story, "Tenshi" (lit. "Angel"), was published in the September 1995 issue of Bessatsu Shōjo Comic magazine and won the 36th Shogakukan Shinjin Comic Award. Izumi also won the Shogakukan Manga Award in the shōjo manga category in 2006 for Sonnanja neyo and in 2015 for Joō no Hana. Two of her manga series, Doubt!! and Seiho Boys' High School!, are licensed in English by Viz Media.

== Works ==
- Te no Hira o Taiyō ni (serialized in Bessatsu Shōjo Comic, 1999)
- Doubt!! (serialized in Bessatsu Shōjo Comic, 2000–2002)
- Sonnanja neyo (serialized in Betsucomi, 2002–2006)
- Seiho Boys' High School! (serialized in Betsucomi, 2006–2010)
- Joō no Hana (serialized in Betsucomi, 2007–2016)
- Suisō Yakyoku (serialized in Monthly Flowers, 2017–2019)
- Cold Game (serialized in Betsucomi, 2017–present)
