= Kanoko Sakurakoji =

Japanese manga artist

Kanoko Sakurakoji 桜小路かのこ
- Born: August 1 Tokyo, Japan
- Area: Manga artist
- Notable works: Backstage Prince; Black Bird
- Awards: 54th Shogakukan Manga Award for shōjo (Black Bird)

Kanoko Sakurakoji (桜小路 かのこ, Sakurakōji Kanoko; born in Tokyo, Japan) is a Japanese manga artist. She writes primarily for Shogakukan in the shōjo manga magazine Betsucomi. She is best known as the author of Backstage Prince and Black Bird. In 2009, Black Bird received the 54th Shogakukan Manga Award for shōjo manga. Both Backstage Prince and Black Bird are licensed in English in North America by Viz Media.

== Selected works ==
- Suzu-chan no Neko (鈴ちゃんの猫; "Suzu-chan's Cat") (2001–2002)—2 volumes
- Rakuen (2004)
- Backstage Prince (2004–2005)
- Ōsama no Shichiya (王様の質屋; "The King's Pawnshop") (2006)—1 volume
- Black Bird (ブラックバード) (2006–2012)–18 volumes
- Seirō Opera (青楼オペラ) (2015–2019)—12 volumes
- Baby, Star
- Bitter – Nakechau Koi Monogatari
- Eikoku Kizoku Goyoutashi
- Yasashii Te
- Yurusarete Inai Watachitachi
- Gokko
- Sono Hakui wo Nuide
- Last Notes
