= We Were There (manga) =

Japanese romance manga and anime series

- The cover of the first Japanese manga volume as published by Shogakukan

僕等がいた (Bokura ga Ita)
- Genre: Drama; Romance; Slice of life
- Manga
- Written by: Yuki Obata
- Published by: Shogakukan
- English publisher: NA: Viz Media
- Imprint: Flower Comics
- Magazine: Betsucomi
- Original run: April 13, 2002 – February 13, 2012
- Volumes: 16
- Anime television series
- Directed by: Kōichirō Sōtome (Chief); Akitaro Daichi
- Produced by: Susumu Hieda; Yasushi Ōshima; Takuya Yui; Fuyuna Iizuka (#1–14); Aya Kawamura (#15–26); Chikako Furuya (#15–26)
- Written by: Mamiko Ikeda
- Music by: Jun Abe; Seiji Mutō
- Studio: Artland
- Original network: Chiba TV, KBS, Tokyo MX, TV Saitama, GBS, Kids Station
- Original run: July 3, 2006 – December 25, 2006
- Episodes: 26
- Live-action film
- Directed by: Takahiro Miki
- Written by: Tomoko Yoshida
- Music by: Suguru Matsutani
- Released: March 17, 2012 (Part 1); April 21, 2012 (Part 2)
- Runtime: 100 minutes

We Were There (Japanese: 僕等がいた, Hepburn: Bokura ga Ita) is a Japanese romance manga series written and illustrated by Yuki Obata. The story follows the relationship between Motoharu Yano and Nanami Takahashi, starting from their teenage years and continuing into their early twenties. It was serialized in Shogakukan's Betsucomi magazine from April 2002 to February 2012 and later collected into 16 bound volumes under the Flower Comics imprint. The manga is licensed for an English-language release in North America by Viz Media.

We Were There was adapted into a 26-episode anime television series, produced by Artland and directed by Akitaro Daichi, which aired in Japan from July 3 to December 25, 2006. A two-part live-action film adaptation, starring Toma Ikuta and Yuriko Yoshitaka, and directed by Takahiro Miki, was released in Japan on March 17 and April 21, 2012, respectively.

In 2005, the series won the 50th Shogakukan Manga Award in the shōjo manga category.

== Plot ==
Nanami Takahashi, a teenage girl in her first year of high school, hopes to make new friends quickly. The center of attention at her school is Motoharu Yano, a very popular boy, whom Nanami dislikes at the beginning, due to his apparent superficiality. However, she soon falls in love with him, but Yano is still affected by the loss of his girlfriend, Nana Yamamoto. Nana was killed in a car crash a year before the beginning of the story. Because she was with her ex-boyfriend at the time of her death, Yano suspects she was cheating on him. Due to this, he is unable to trust people or to talk about his relationship with her; instead, he chooses to pretend he does not care very much about the situation.

Nanami confesses her love to Yano but is rejected when he is unable to tell her if he loves her back. Despite that, she is still willing to support him and reassures him she will always be by his side. Soon, Yano realizes he has fallen in love with her as well, so they start going out. However, Yano's secrets (including the fact that he slept with Nana's little sister, Yuri, after the accident and his unwillingness to talk about his feelings for his dead girlfriend) make Nanami unsure to the point that she decides to end the relationship, believing she is unable to make him happy. The story becomes even more complicated when Masafumi Takeuchi, Yano's best friend, also falls in love with Nanami and becomes Yano's rival.

Due to these circumstances, Nanami is confused over whom she should choose, but she soon realizes that Yano is the one she genuinely loves. She agrees to start going out with him again, on the condition that she can find out more about the relationship between Nana and Yano and his true feelings about what had happened. Their romance takes an unexpected turn when Yano finds out that his mother, Yoko, wants to move to Tokyo. Upon hearing this, Nanami tells him to make a decision without taking her into consideration. The anime ends with Yano's departure; however, the two of them decide to continue their relationship.

The manga picks up four years later. It is revealed that Yano and Nanami kept in touch for about six months; then, suddenly, he stopped contacting her and disappeared without a trace. Tired of waiting, hurt and confused, Nanami starts a relationship with Takeuchi. Even so, she is still in love with Yano and unable to forget about their common past. She befriends a co-worker named Akiko Sengenji, who is revealed to be one of Yano's classmates from the Tokyo high school he transferred to. In a series of flashbacks, it is shown that Yano was forced to work part-time when his mother was diagnosed with cancer, but kept everything hidden from Nanami, not wanting to worry her. Following an unexpected visit from Michiko, her former friend and the wife of Yano's father, Yoko became increasingly paranoid, fearing he would leave her. When Yano announced his decision to go and visit Nanami, she accused him of being insensitive. After a short, but violent fight, Yoko hung herself; as in Nana's case, Yano blamed himself for her death and therefore decided to sever all the ties with his past.

Sengenji is also in love with Yano, but, despite this, she sees Nanami as a friend, not as a rival. She is the one who reveals Yano's whereabouts to Nanami (including the fact that he adopted his father's name, Nagakura) and later the fact that he lives with Yuri Yamamoto. As a result, Nanami rejects Takeuchi when he proposes to her, feeling that it wouldn't be fair to marry him. Upon meeting Nanami for the first time in more than five years, Yano claims he is in love with another woman. However, when he and Nanami meet again, she tells him that she knows about the relationship between him and Yuri. He then admits that he only stays with Yuri because her mother is dying and he feels he can't leave her alone. He also tells Nanami about his mother's suicide, and also about his panic attacks. During this meeting, it is hinted that he's still in love with her.

Meanwhile, Takeuchi decides to continue his relationship with Nanami, but only as friends. He tells her that she will eventually reach Yano and asks her to wait for him. He also starts to push Yano to admit his own feelings for Nanami and points out that no matter how strong she seems, she is unable to deal with the situation by herself. Nanami and Yano have an unexpected meeting, during which Yano finally confesses he wanted her to hold him back instead of letting him leave with his mother. Shortly after, Yuri's mother dies, which prompts Yuri to end her relationship with Yano. She reveals to him that her sister Nana never cheated on him and that she only wanted to have a proper break-up with her ex-boyfriend at the time of the accident.

Yano decides to start over with Nanami and tries to contact her on the telephone. He fails several times due to her busy schedule, but eventually reaches her. During their conversation, a severely over-worked and anemic Nanami falls down a flight of stairs and is brought to the hospital injured and unconscious. Terrified by the possibility of losing her as well, Yano rushes to her side; as a result, the two of them are reunited. The finale of the manga shows Yano proposing to Nanami and then visiting Nana Yamamoto's gravesite with her.

== Characters ==
- Nanami "Nana" Takahashi (高橋 七美, Takahashi Nanami), the series protagonist, is a girl who falls in love during high school with the popular Motoharu Yano. They struggle with issues of trusting one another as the shadow of Yano's dead girlfriend, who was with another guy at the time she died, looms over them. In the manga, it is shown that Yano stopped contacting her after half a year following his departure to Tokyo, which eventually led to their breaking up. She eventually begins dating Takeuchi, Yano's best friend, but is unable to forget her former love. She is shown to be very sweet and caring, and she supports Yano unconditionally, even putting her own feelings and needs aside. At one point, Yano even confesses to Takeuchi that he believes she is strong enough to carry on without him. She is described as having a "baby-like" face by both Yano and Takeuchi and being cute rather than beautiful. In the anime adaptation, she is voiced by Nozomi Sasaki. In the movie adaptation, she is played by Yuriko Yoshitaka.
- Motoharu "Moto" Yano (矢野 元晴, Yano Motoharu) is a popular boy whose girlfriend was killed in a car crash while out with another guy. He has a hard time trusting Nanami, and displays jealousy and possessiveness, but he is also shown to be really childish and willing to receive affection (Nanami even compares him with a cat at one point). As the series progresses, he wrestles with his feelings for his dead girlfriend versus those for the living Nanami, whom he even calls "Nana-chan" at times. Yano moves to Tokyo with his mother, Yoko, but after half a year he stops contacting Nanami, effectively breaking up with her. Eventually, it is revealed that his mother killed herself, after which he disappeared. He reappears four years later, living with Yuri Yamamoto but still remembering Nanami. The tragedies he had to cope with left him in a deep state of despair, making him blame himself and believe there is something wrong with his way of loving. He eventually manages to recover with Nanami and Takeuchi's help. In the anime adaptation, he is voiced by Hiroshi Yazaki. In the movie adaptation, he is played by Toma Ikuta.
- Masafumi "Take" Takeuchi (竹内 匡史, Takeuchi Masafumi) is Yano's close friend and becomes a friend and confidant for Nanami after she begins dating Yano. As the series progresses, he finds himself falling in love with her, leaving him unsure how to proceed. When Yano breaks up with Nanami, they begin dating. He eventually proposes, but she turns him down. He is an understanding, calm, and nice person, and cares deeply for both Nanami and Yano (whom he calls "Moto"). After being rejected by Nanami, he decides to do his best to support her and bring Yano back to her. In the anime adaptation, he is voiced by Takuji Kawakubo. In the movie adaptation, he is played by Sosuke Takaoka.
- Yuri Yamamoto (山本 有里, Yamamoto Yuri) is the younger sister of Nana, Yano's late girlfriend. She suffers a lot because of her unrequited love for Yano. A week after Nana's death, Yano had sex with her. She originally believed he was simply using her, but later suspects he was pitying her. After Yano begins dating Nanami, she becomes an obstacle for their relationship as Yano continues displaying some closeness with her. After her mother gets sick, Yano moves in with her. When her mother dies, she decides to let Yano go and ends their relationship. She also reveals to Yano the truth about her sister's feelings for him (her sister actually loved Yano but wanted to tell her ex-boyfriend about it, thus, she decided to go on a drive with her ex-boyfriend but they died in a car accident). In the anime adaptation, she is voiced by Erina Nakayama. In the movie adaptation, she is played by Yuika Motokariya.
- Akiko "Aki" Sengenji (千見寺 亜希子, Sengenji Akiko) is Yano's former classmate from Tokyo. She is also in love with Yano but is well aware of the fact that he only sees her as a friend. Therefore, she does not see Nanami as a rival. She is the one who reveals Yano's whereabouts to Nanami and is shown to have a hard time dealing with the whole story - she confesses at one point that she would be unable to wait for someone as long as Nanami did. Her character does not appear in the anime at all. In the movie, she is played by Manami Higa.
- Nana Yamamoto (山本 奈々, Yamamoto Nana) is Yano's girlfriend who died in a car accident before the start of the series. Despite the fact she was older than Yano, she had a really childish personality, therefore being considered stupid by most of Yano's friends. She was the first woman Yano ever loved, which made her one of the most important obstacles in the relationship between him and Nanami. In the anime adaptation, she is voiced by Yurin. In the movie adaptation, she is played by Ayaka Komatsu.

== Media ==
=== Manga ===
Written and illustrated by Yuki Obata, We Were There was serialized in Shogakukan's monthly shōjo manga magazine Betsucomi, starting in the May 2002 issue (released on April 13). The series went on an 18-month hiatus following the January 2008 issue (released in December 2007) and resumed serialization in the July 2009 issue (released in June). The final chapter was published in Betsucomi's March 2012 issue (released on February 13). The individual chapters were collected into 16 tankōbon (bound volumes) by Shogakukan under the Flower Comics imprint. The first volume was published on October 26, 2002, and the last volume was published on March 26, 2012.

The series is licensed for an English-language release in North America by Viz Media under the Shojo Beat imprint. The first volume was published on November 4, 2008, and the last volume was published on May 7, 2013. We Were There is also licensed for regional language releases in France by Soleil Manga, in Germany by Egmont Manga & Anime, and in Argentina and Spain by Editorial Ivrea.

==== Volume list ====
No.	Original release date	Original ISBN	English release date	English ISBN
1	October 26, 2002	4-0913-8191-X	November 4, 2008	1-4215-2018-4
Chapters 1–4; Notes
2	February 26, 2003	4-0913-81928	January 6, 2009	1-4215-2019-2
Chapters 5–8
3	June 26, 2003	4-0913-8193-6	March 3, 2009	1-4215-2020-6
Chapters 9–12
4	November 26, 2003	4-0913-8194-4	May 5, 2009	1-4215-2021-4
Chapters 13–16
5	April 26, 2004	4-0913-8195-2	July 7, 2009	1-4215-2022-2
Chapters 17-19; Bonus Story: Run, Baby, Run
6	July 26, 2004	4-0913-8196-0	September 1, 2009	1-4215-2023-0
Chapters 20-23
7	December 20, 2004	4-0913-8197-9	November 3, 2009	1-4215-2024-9
Chapters 24-27
8	April 25, 2005	4-0913-8198-7	January 5, 2010	1-4215-2025-7
Chapters 28-31
9	December 20, 2005	4-0913-0280-7	March 2, 2010	1-4215-2026-5
Chapters 32-35
10	April 26, 2006	4-0913-0437-0	May 4, 2010	1-4215-2027-3
Chapters 36-39
11	November 24, 2006	4-0913-0718-3	July 06, 2010	1-4215-2028-1
Chapters 40-44
12	August 24, 2007	978-4-0913-1080-4	May 3, 2011	1-4215-2160-1
Chapters 45-48; Bonus Story: Be Careful, Little Red Riding Hood!!
13	October 26, 2009	978-4-0913-2716-1	November 1, 2011	1-4215-3673-0
Chapters 49-53
14	August 26, 2010	978-4-0913-3390-2	May 5, 2012	1-4215-4098-3
Chapters 54-59; Bonus Story
15	June 24, 2011	978-4-0913-3798-6	November 6, 2012	1-4215-4216-1
Chapters 60-64
16	March 26, 2012	978-4-09-134317-8	May 7, 2013	1-4215-5155-1
Chapters 65-70

=== Anime ===
We Were There was adapted into an anime television series, produced by Artland and directed by Akitaro Daichi, which premiered in Japan on July 3, 2006. It aired for 26 episodes until its conclusion on December 25, 2006. The episodes were released on nine Region 2 DVD volumes by Pony Canyon, with each volume containing three episodes, except the final volume which contained two. The first volume was released on October 4, 2006, and the last on June 6, 2007.

=== Film ===
In May 2011, production on a live-action film adaption of the manga was announced. The film was released in two parts in Japan on March 17 and April 21, 2012. It was directed by Takahiro Miki and starred Ikuta Toma and Yoshitaka Yuriko in the lead roles.

=== Other media ===
Two CD soundtracks, produced by Marvelous Entertainment, were released by Geneon Entertainment on February 7, 2007, using music from the anime adaptation. Eternity (永遠, Eien) contained twelve tracks, while Locus (軌跡, Kiseki) contained 22 tracks.

A fan book, We Were There Official Fan Book (僕等がいた 公式ファンブック, Bokura ga Ita Koushiki Fan Bukku), containing character profiles, a summary of the story, and commentary on the series from Obata was published by Shogakukan on November 25, 2005.

A 36-page postcard book was also published by Shogakukan on December 21, 2007.

== Reception ==
In 2005, We Were There won the 50th Shogakukan Manga Award in the shōjo category, tied with Hinako Ashihara's Sand Chronicles. The manga has sold over 10 million copies in Japan.
