= Monkey High! =

Japanese shōjo manga series by Shouko Akira

- Cover of the first Japanese volume of Monkey High! as published by Shogakukan

サルヤマっ! (Saruyama!)
- Genre: Comedy, romance
- Manga
- Written by: Shouko Akira
- Published by: Shogakukan
- English publisher: NA: Viz Media
- Magazine: Deracomi; Betsucomi
- Original run: 2004 – February 2008
- Volumes: 8

Monkey High! (Japanese: サルヤマっ!, Hepburn: Saruyama!) is a Japanese shōjo manga series written and illustrated by Shouko Akira. It was first serialized in Shogakukan's Deracomi magazine, starting in 2004. It transferred to Betsucomi magazine in the October 2005 issue (released in September) and ran until its conclusion in the March 2008 issue (released in February). Shogakukan later collected the individual chapters into eight bound volumes under the Flower Comics imprint. Viz Media licensed the series for an English-language release in North America.

== Synopsis ==
After her politician father is disgraced by a scandal, Haruna Aizawa transfers to a new high school. Haruna thinks that school life is just like a monkey mountain—all the monkeys form cliques, get into fights, and get back together again. The school she just transferred to is no exception. There's even a boy called Macharu who reminds her of a baby monkey.

It's hard enough fitting in at a new school while dealing with family problems. Will Haruna remain jaded and distance herself from everyone around her? Or will Macharu win her over with his monkey magic?

== Characters ==
- Haruna Aizawa is the new transfer student. She transferred out of her old school because her father was involved in a political scandal. At first, she is very reserved and condescending to her fellow peers, comparing them to monkeys. She quickly ends up falling for Masaru, and even when they begin dating, she likes to deny her feelings for him due to embarrassment.
- Masaru "Macharu" Yamashita is a goofy boy that attends Haruna's new school. He is often referred to as the "Baby Monkey" because of his personality and appearance. He is very close with Atsu. Macharu's family runs a produce store, which keeps both of his parents busy. His little sister, Misato, resembles him closely. He quickly falls for Haruna. The two eventually begin dating. Masaru thinks that he will marry Haruna one day; he is so sure about this that he told her father.
- Atsuyuki Kidao is a classmate and friend of both Haruna and Masaru. He is the student council president and is popular with the girls. Though he seems like a player, Atsu is very kind and caring, often helping Masaru and Haruna make up when they fight. Later on, however, he seems to develop feelings for Haruna, though he doesn't act on it until later in the story. He often teases Masaru. His family runs a beauty salon.
- Chika is a classmate. She attended middle school with Haruna where she was the captain of the girls' basketball team. Chika greatly admires Haruna, resulting in her thinking Masaru isn't good enough for Haruna. Chika joins the student council with Atsu.
- Kobuhei is a classmate. He is seen as comical as others often tease him because he is really fat. Though he doesn't have good looks, Kobuhei is talented in singing, even joining a band and getting gigs.

== Reception ==
Theron Martin at Anime News Network comments on the author's depiction of both the male and female lead having the same height. Manga Life's Ysabet Reinhardt MacFarlane commends the author for "contrasting the emotional moments and the hectic school scenes". Comics Worth Reading's Johanna Draper Carlson comments on the manga's uniqueness in the shōjo genre.
