= Sonnanja neyo =

Japanese manga series by Kaneyoshi Izumi

- Japanese cover of the first manga volume

そんなんじゃねえよ
- Genre: Romantic comedy
- Manga
- Written by: Kaneyoshi Izumi
- Published by: Shogakukan
- Imprint: Flower Comics
- Magazine: Betsucomi
- Original run: October 2002 – May 2006
- Volumes: 9

Sonnan ja nē yo (Japanese: そんなんじゃねえよ; lit. 'It's not like that!') is a Japanese romantic comedy manga series written and illustrated by Kaneyoshi Izumi. It was serialized in Shogakukan's Betsucomi magazine from October 2002 to May 2006 and later collected into nine bound volumes under the Flower Comics imprint.

In 2006, Sonnan ja nē yo won the 51st Shogakukan Manga Award in the shōjo category.

== Publication ==
Sonnan ja nē yo was serialized in Shogakukan's Betsucomi magazine from the November 2002 issue (released in October) to the June 2006 issue (released in May). Shogakukan collected the individual chapters into nine bound volumes under the Flower Comics imprint. The first volume was released on March 26, 2003, and the last volume was released on June 26, 2006.

=== List of volumes ===
No.	Japanese release date	Japanese ISBN
1	March 26, 2003	978-4-09-137275-8
2	July 26, 2003	978-4-09-137276-5
3	January 26, 2004	978-4-09-137277-2
4	March 26, 2004	978-4-09-137278-9
5	September 24, 2004	978-4-09-137279-6
6	January 26, 2005	978-4-09-137280-2
7	June 24, 2005	978-4-09-130150-5
8	January 26, 2006	978-4-09-130319-6
9	June 26, 2006	978-4-09-130540-4

== Reception ==
Sonnan ja nē yo won the 51st Shogakukan Manga Award in the shōjo manga category in 2006. The manga reached a circulation of 1,200,000 copies with six volumes in May of that year.
