= Beast Master (manga) =

Japanese shōjo manga series by Kyousuke Motomi

ビーストマスター (Bīsuto Masutā)
- Genre: Comedy, romance
- Manga
- Written by: Kyousuke Motomi
- Published by: Shogakukan
- English publisher: NA: Viz Media
- Imprint: Flower Comics
- Magazine: Betsucomi
- Original run: September 2006 – February 2007
- Volumes: 2

Beast Master (Japanese: ビーストマスタ, Hepburn: Bīsuto Masutā) is a Japanese shōjo manga series written and illustrated by Kyousuke Motomi. The story follows the relationship between Yuiko, an animal lover, and Leo, a childish young man who has problems adapting because everyone considers him a beast. It was serialized in Shogakukan's Betsucomi magazine from September 2006 to February 2007. Shogakukan later collected the individual chapters into two bound volumes under the Flower Comics imprint. Viz Media licensed the series for an English-language release in North America.

== Plot ==
Yuiko Kubozuka is a high school student who loves animals, though unfortunately, animals hate her and flee from her whenever possible. When Leo Aoi, a strange student with a terrifying expression, transfers to Yuiko's class, she is surprised to learn that he is actually innocent and sweet-natured and animals are easily drawn to him. However, when attacked, Leo unconsciously becomes as violent as a bloodthirsty animal.

Because Yuiko is the first to see beyond his frightening expressions, Leo quickly becomes strongly attached to Yuiko, who is his first friend. They fall in love with one another, but circumstances regarding Leo's family situation threaten to separate them.

== Characters ==
Yuiko Kubozuka (窪塚 結子, Kubozuka Yuiko)
A 17-year-old girl who loves animals, though they are fearful of her because of her overly-loving approach to them. She is easy-going and well-liked by her peers. One day, she meets Leo Aoi when she chases a lost cat up the tree (because of her overly adoring nature) and he saves it. The two almost immediately develop a close relationship, mainly because she is the only person who is not scared of him. She accepts Leo's secret and becomes the only person able to tame him. She soon comes to love him. In school, she is known as the "Beast Master" for her ability to contain Leo. Her father is a veterinarian and her family runs a veterinary clinic.
Leo Aoi (蒼井 礼央, Aoi Reō)
A 17 going on 18-year-old boy whose sharp eyes resemble those of a beast. Despite his looks, he is cute and childish. He cares deeply for Yuiko as she is his first friend and he soon falls in love with her. When Leo sees blood, his animalistic alter-ego emerges. In these moments, Yuiko is the only person able to stop him without resorting to tranquilizer darts. Leo is clueless about many things because he has been living in remote locations for most of his life. He is forced to move around because of threatening relatives who want the large inheritance of 120 billion yen he is revealed to have later in the series. His father arrives to move him shortly after an attack by one of his relatives, but instead of running, he comes back to Yuiko.
Kyle Tokizaburō Rosenburg (カイル・時三郎・ローゼンバーグ, Kairu Tokizaburo Rōzenbaagu)
Kyle is Leo's caretaker and he loves him greatly. He was originally the secretary of Leo's late grandfather, from whom Leo receives his inheritance. He used to be in the military, which may explain his strength. His character provides a great deal of the manga's humor.

== Manga ==
Beast Master was written and illustrated by Kyousuke Motomi. It was serialized in Shogakukan's monthly shōjo manga magazine Betsucomi from the October 2006 issue (released in September) to the March 2007 issue (released in February). The individual chapters were collected into two tankōbon (bound volumes) by publisher Shogakukan.

The series is licensed for an English-language release in North America by Viz Media. It is also licensed in Taiwan by Ever Glory Publishing, in France by Kazé Manga, in Italy by Flashbook Edizioni, and in Poland by Waneko.

No.	Original release date	Original ISBN	North American release date	North American ISBN
1	February 26, 2007	9784091308542	November 3, 2009	1-4215-3201-8
Contains chapters 1–4, plus one short bonus story ("Fly")
Overzealous animal lover Yuiko Kubozuka becomes friends with Leo Aoi, a boy who looks like a crazy animal with wild eyes but a special connection with animals. However, her resolve is tested when she learns that while Leo is actually quite gentle, he goes berserk whenever he sees blood.
2	July 27, 2007	9784091311580	February 2, 2010	1-4215-3202-6
Contains chapters 5–7, plus one short bonus story ("Summer Cactus Surprise")
Leo's 18th birthday is around the corner, but celebrating seems impossible as someone is after Leo's life. Leo must overcome the dangers of his past or the beast-like boy will be separated from his beloved "master" forever.
