= Zenryaku Milk House =

Japanese manga series

- Cover of the first volume of Zenryaku Milk House

前略・ミルクハウス
- Genre: Romantic comedy, slice of life
- Manga
- Written by: Yumiko Kawahara
- Published by: Shogakukan
- Imprint: Flower Comics; Sonorama Comic Bunko
- Magazine: Bessatsu Shōjo Comic
- Original run: March 1983 – May 1986
- Volumes: 10
- Television drama
- Directed by: Keiichirō Yoshida
- Produced by: Chihiro Kameyama
- Written by: Hideo Takayashiki
- Studio: Fuji TV; Watanabe Productions
- Original network: Fuji TV
- Original run: August 3, 1987
- Episodes: 1

Zenryaku Milk House (Japanese: 前略・ミルクハウス; "Omission Milk House") is a Japanese slice of life romantic comedy manga series written and illustrated by Yumiko Kawahara.

The manga was serialized in Shogakukan's Bessatsu Shōjo Comic from the March 1983 issue to the May 1986 issue, with a total of 39 chapters. The individual chapters were compiled by Shogakukan under their imprint Flower Comics into ten tankōbon volumes. In 2014, the series was reissued as bunkoban edition of six volumes were published by Asahi Sonorama under imprint Sonorama Comic Bunko.

In 1987, a television drama special adaptation was broadcast by Fuji TV.

== Plot ==
Serika Matsumoto moves to Tokyo to begin her university life, and while looking for a room, she come across a beautiful woman dressed in kimono, Suzune Sakuragawa. Suzune offers her a room at the Milk House, a Western-style house, and she accepts it with a half-hearted reply. Serika considers looking for another room, but when a woman she meets in town, Mizuki, moves in, she decides to live in the Milk House. Later, she was joined by Professor Yoshikawa and his son Isamu, and their lively lodging life at the Milk House begins.

== Media ==
=== Television drama ===
A live action TV drama special aired on August 3, 1987, on Fuji TV's Monday Dramaland (月曜ドラマランド, Getsuyō Doramarando) program.

==== Cast ====
- Yōko Ishino as Serika Matsumoto
- Hideyuki Nakayama as Fuji Yasuhara
- Daisuke Matsuno as Takayuki Tashiro
- Fukumi Kuroda as Mizuki Hashimoto
- Chiaki Watanabe as Suzune Sakuragawa
- Meika Seri as Maiko Yoshikawa
- Katsuma Nakagaki (中垣克麻 Nagaki Katsuma) as Isamu Yoshikawa
- Kōji Nakamoto as Professor Yoshikawa
- Toshirô Shimazaki as Tetsu
- Yasuo Kawakami as Ron
- Susumu Kobayashi as Yasu
- Miyuki Imori as Yayoi Sakurada
- Tadashi Satō as Sensei
- Seiko Asaga (浅賀誠子 Asaga Seiko) as Store manager
- Shin Yasuda as Officer
- Takeo Chii as Hanada-gumi, Kumichō

== Reception ==
In 1985, the series won the 31st Shogakukan Manga Award for shōjo.
