= Usotsuki! Gokuō-kun =

Japanese manga series

- First tankōbon volume cover

ウソツキ!ゴクオーくん
- Genre: Mystery
- Manga
- Written by: Makoto Yoshimoto
- Published by: Shogakukan
- Imprint: Tentomusi CoroCoro Comics
- Magazine: Bessatsu CoroCoro Comic (August 30, 2011 – June 30, 2012); CoroCoro Comic (August 11, 2012 – September 15, 2021)
- Original run: August 30, 2011 – September 15, 2021
- Volumes: 25
- icon

Usotsuki! Gokuō-kun (ウソツキ!ゴクオーくん) is a Japanese manga series written and illustrated by Makoto Yoshimoto. It was serialized in Shogakukan's children's manga magazine Bessatsu CoroCoro Comic from August 2011 to June 2012 and later in CoroCoro Comic from August 2012 to September 21. Its chapters were collected in 25 tankōbon volumes.

== Publication ==
Written and illustrated by Makoto Yoshimoto, Usotsuki! Gokuō-kun was serialized in Shogakukan's children's manga magazine Bessatsu CoroCoro Comic from August 30, 2011, to June 30, 2012. (Note: It was seralized in the magazine from the October 2011 to the August 2012 issues, released on August 30, 2011, and June 30, 2012, respectively.) It was later serialized in CoroCoro Comic from August 11, 2012, to September 15, 2021. (Note: It started in the magazine's September 2012 issue, released on August 11, 2012.) Shogakukan collected its chapters in 25 tankōbon volumes, released from April 27, 2012, to February 28, 2022. A five-volume kanzenban edition, with each volume collecting five of the original tankōbon volumes, was released from February 27 to June 27, 2025.

== Other media ==
Gokuō-kun was featured in a special original net animation (ONA), titled 40-Shūnen da yo! Coro Coro All-Star Shōgakkō (40周年だよ!! コロコロオールスター小学校), released on YouTube to celebrate the 40th anniversary of CoroCoro Comic on July 15, 2017.

== Reception ==
The series won the 61st Shogakukan Manga Award in the children category in 2016. It ranked second in AnimeJapan's "Manga We Want to See Animated" poll in 2025; it ranked seventh in the same poll the following year.
