= Seiho Boys' High School! =

Japanese manga series

- First volume cover

メンズ校 (Menzu-kō)
- Genre: Romantic comedy
- Manga
- Written by: Kaneyoshi Izumi
- Published by: Shogakukan
- English publisher: NA: Viz Media
- Magazine: Betsucomi
- Original run: August 11, 2006 – February 13, 2010
- Volumes: 8
- Television drama
- Directed by: Shunsuke Kariyama; Mitsushi Okamoto; Masataka Hayashi
- Written by: Naomi Hiruta
- Original network: TV Tokyo
- Original run: October 8, 2020 – December 24, 2020
- Episodes: 12

Seiho Boys' High School! (Japanese: メンズ校, Hepburn: Menzu-kō) is a Japanese manga series written and illustrated by Kaneyoshi Izumi. It was serialized in Shogakukan's Betsucomi magazine from August 2006 to February 2010 and collected into eight volumes. A television drama adaptation aired on TV Tokyo from October to December 2020.

== Media ==
=== Manga ===
Written and illustrated by Kaneyoshi Izumi, the series began serialization in Shogakukan's Betsucomi magazine on August 11, 2006. (Note: It started in the magazine's September 2006 issue, released on August 11 of that same year.) It completed serialization on February 13, 2010. Its individual chapters were collected into eight tankōbon volumes, released from January 26, 2007, to May 26, 2010. An epilogue chapter was released in Betsucomi in July 2020.

Viz Media published the series in English.

=== Stage play ===
A stage play adaptation was performed at the Hakuhinkan Theater in Ginza from August 5–10, 2010. It starred Momosuke Mizutani and Ryutora Isogai, with Plus performing its main theme.

=== TV drama ===
A television drama adaptation was announced in March 2020. It was directed by Shunsuke Kariyama, Mitsushi Okamoto, and Masataka Hayashi, with Naomi Hiruta writing the scripts and the members of Naniwa Danshi performing the lead roles. It was originally set to premiere in July 2020, but was delayed due to the COVID-19 pandemic in Japan. Naniwa Danshi also performed its main theme, "Aoharu: With U with Me". The series aired from October 8 to December 24, 2020, on TV Tokyo's Dramaholic! programming block.

== Reception ==
Zack Davisson of Manga Life praised the humor and artwork. He also felt the series "offeres up fan service for both guy and girl fans". Karen Maeda of Sequential Tart praised the artwork and characters, describing the former as "fun" and noting it was easy to follow. Lissa Pattillo of Anime News Network felt the manga had some good comedic moments and praised the Viz Media translation, though Pattillo also felt the art was generic and criticized the episodic storytelling.
