= Dolls (1995 manga) =

Collection of manga short stories

- North American cover of the first manga volume

観用少女 (Kan Yō Shōjo)
- Genre: Supernatural
- Manga
- Written by: Yumiko Kawahara
- Published by: Asahi Sonorama
- English publisher: NA: Viz Media
- Magazine: Nemurenu Yoru no Kimyou na Hanashi
- Original run: 1995 – 1999
- Volumes: 4

Dolls (観用少女, Kan Yō Shōjo; lit. Ornamental Girls) is a collection of short manga stories by Yumiko Kawahara. In the US, it is published by VIZ Media. It was serialized in Nemurenu Yoru no Kimyou na Hanashi ("Mysterious Stories for Sleepless Nights"), as stated in volume 1 of the English version of Dolls.

== Story ==
The stories revolve around special dolls, the Plant Dolls, and the people who buy them. The dolls choose their owners, and desperately need their owners' love; they often reflect their owners' personalities for better or worse. Each story is independent of each other, though there may be references to knowledge learned in previous stories. Some stories have a fairy-tale like quality: they are eerie fables meant to warn against certain actions. There are several non-Plant-Doll related stories included in the Viz-released volumes as well.

== Plant Dolls ==
Plant Dolls are living dolls, though their lives are passive, spent mostly in silence. They sleep waiting for an owner, and most awaken only once they have found them. Once they have made a connection with a person, it is nearly impossible for them to be sold to another owner. They are made to love and be loved, and without affection, Plant Dolls can 'wilt'.

They drink milk warmed to body temperature three times a day, and take sugar cookies or cake once a week as fertilizer. Each doll is unique, though the same "model" can be available. They are "so expensive the price will make your eyeballs pop out," and associated accessories and care are similarly expensive. Plant Dolls resemble young girls, but given improper treatment, they 'grow up'. This is especially true if they are given anything to eat or drink other than milk and cookies.

When they cry, their tears become valuable jewels called "Tears of Heaven". Plant Dolls are shown to have very lovely smiles, often deeply touching those who see them. There are two known models of Plant Dolls: potpourri dolls and singing dolls. Potpourri dolls take perfume balls with their meals and exude a pleasant scent.

In Volume 2, Kawahara cites her influence as related to the Victorian mythologization of girls. Ephemeral, passive girlhood is idolised and revered; the treatment of Plant Dolls exemplify this 'girl worship'.

== Volumes ==
=== Volume 1 ===
- Milk at Mealtimes: A man spoils his Plant Doll, and it matures into a "woman".
- Potpourri Doll: A mentally unbalanced man buys his daughter a Plant Doll, and starts to obsess over the "nauseating scent" coming from it.
- Snow White, Part I: A jeweller tries to obtain Tears of Heaven from a Plant Doll named Snow White.
- Snow White, Part II: A poor man takes in a Plant Doll and dies from the exhaustion of taking care of it. In the end the doll cries Tears of Heaven.
- Rainy Moon: An artist with a supernatural reputation is commissioned to paint a portrait of a Plant Doll named Rainy Moon.
- Lucky Doll: A man's Plant Doll, named Otohime, grants him good luck, yet his girlfriend is somewhat skeptical.
- The Distant Sound of Water: A man wanders the city trying to regain his memory.
- A Spell to Unbind Spring: In a secluded manor, a young man is haunted by the legend of a girl who drowned in a nearby lake.

=== Volume 2 ===
- Blue Doll: A man working for a collection agency takes in a Plant Doll left behind by former clients.
- The Garden in the Sky: A maid gets entangled in a plot involving a fortune depending on the words spoken by a Plant Doll.
- The Missing Doll: A woman tries to find the Plant Doll once owned by her dead grandmother.
- Princess Jewel: When a boy's sister dies, his father buys a Plant Doll to help his mother deal with it.
- The Role of an Angel: After getting divorced, a young model buys a Plant Doll.
- Forbidden Fruit: Olympia is a special kind of Plant Doll, one who sings. But there is a sinister secret about this certain Plant Doll.
- A Voice in the Night: A woman wanders the city only to stumble upon her corpse.

=== Volume 3 ===
- The Garden of Arcadia: A young man who is mysteriously transforming into a tree is taken to a research institute where he is comforted by many plant dolls.
- Circle: A group pools their money together to buy a plant doll, which they will all take care of. However, when most of the members begin to see the joy in breaking the rules of plant doll care, one member must take charge of her.
- Honeymoon: A young girl finds that her previously adoring father has bought a doll that is identical to her in her childhood.
- Dreams of Flying High in the Sky: A lonely novelist buys a plant doll to impress his editor. When she leaves to marry her sweetheart, he must raise the doll by himself. The problem is, the doll doesn't respond to him and he has never taken care of her!
- Emerald: A rich woman's young lover wishes to possess a plant doll. As he yearns after the doll his mistress begins to lose interest in him.
- The Storm: A young girl who is kept in a gilded cage attempts to escape to live life to its fullest.

=== Volume 4 ===
- Quicksand: When a sick young boy dreams of a beautiful plant doll with aqua blue eyes, his parents are quick to purchase her when he sees it in the shop. As the boy spends more time with the doll his health begins to improve.
- A Gift: In the midst of refuse an angel waits to awaken. When she is woken before her time, will she ever bloom into a proper angel plant doll?
- Coral: A father brings home a mysterious ball of coral with a tiny plant doll inside. As the doll spends more time in the sun, the bigger she grows.
- The Tiara of Melancholy: A brother and sister team is hired to grow the fabled Tiara of Melancholy for a rich man. What they soon find out is that as the tiara grows it draws its energy from the doll itself.

=== Volume 5 ===
Note: This is part of an omnibus series only released in Japan.

- Looking at a Dream
- Moonlight Shadow
- Princess Aurora
- Elixir
- Last Night's Incense
- The Talkative Gravestone
- Winter Palace

== Reception ==
Comic World News's Michael May praised the "creepy and thoughtful" stories and the "intricate and delicate" art, and stated that the series focused on "the concepts of love and selfishness and how they connect." Mangalife's Kathryn Ramage enjoyed the "sadly touching, even haunting, sometimes unsettling, and even occasionally funny" short stories. Conversely, Megan Sutton of Animefringe criticized the "hard to follow" story panels and the uninteresting stories which were "too short to have any sustainable plot".
