= Yōko Ishino =

Japanese actress and tarento (born 1968)

- Born: February 20, 1968 (age 58); Ashiya, Hyōgo, Japan
- Occupations: Actress, tarento
- Years active: 1986–present
- Website: https://grandslam.ciao.jp/ishinoyoko/

Yōko Ishino (石野陽子, Ishino Youko, born 20 February 1968) is a Japanese actress and television personality (tarento). She debuted in 1985 as a pop singer, first appeared on television in 1986 and performed comedy with Shimura Ken in the TV show "Shimura Ken's Daijobudaa".

== Early life ==
Yōko was born on February 20, 1968, in Ashiya, Hyōgo Prefecture, into a wealthy family; her parents ran a beaded handbag manufacturing company. She grew up there as the second of three daughters. Her older sister is actress and singer Mako Ishino, and her younger sister is actress and talent Jun Takano.

In first grade, concerned about her health, Yōko's parents enrolled her in figure skating lessons. Three months later, she won a competition, earning a spot as a trainee under coach Sonoko Nakano. She practiced daily before school and into the evening, often travelling to a rink in Osaka. Her only leisure time was spent watching television on Sunday mornings.

When her mother began accompanying her older sister Mako to Tokyo for her entertainment career, Yōko took on household chores and stopped skating in her first year of junior high school. During spring and summer breaks, she visited Mako in Tokyo, dreaming of becoming a hair and makeup artist.

She attended a public junior high school in Ashiya City before graduating from Koshien Gakuin High School and later Horikoshi High School.

== Career ==
Yōko was noticed by a talent scout while visiting her older sister, the singer Mako Ishino, on set. She made her first appearance on television in 1985, when she was seventeen, as an idol singer with "Teddy Boy Blues".

In her late teens, she appeared on a travel show alongside the comedian Ken Shimura. During a chat on the location bus, Shimura remarked, "You're funny." This led to an invitation to join his comedy program Dorifu Daibakusho, where she took part in a thief skit. After the recording, Shimura asked her to become a regular on his new show Daijobudaa. Initially inclined to decline, she was persuaded when Shimura assured her, "Think of it as a study session; it's perfectly fine if you commit just for three months (one season)," and so she accepted the offer.

After a roughly five-year run on Daijobudaa, Ishino went on to appear regularly on Shimura Ken wa Ikaga Deshou (1993–1995). Following the end of that show, she took a break from comedy sketches. Then, upon reuniting with Shimura for the first time in over a decade, he invited her to perform in a comedy sketch for the 2012 stage production Shimura Tamashii.

== Personal life ==
In 1991, she was spotted by Shukan Josei magazine with Shimura as they left his Tokyo house on their way to work. When the reporter inquired, "Is she (Ishino) your girlfriend?", Shimura nodded and replied, "Yes!" "They lived together for about a year after that, but eventually broke up."

== Filmography ==
Film
Year	Title	Role	Reference
1987	Aitsu ni Koishite	the Kyoto girl	
1987	Tokyo Blackout	Mieko Matsunaga	
1995	Godzilla vs. Destoroyah	Yukari Yamane	
2005	Shichinin no Tomurai	Someko Hashimoto	
1999	The King of Minami: Bankruptcy - Loan Shark Murder		
1998	The King of Minami: Fallen Women		
1997	The King of Minami: Revenge Shot		
1997	The King of Minami: Con Man Exterminator		
1995	Nanba kin'yû-den, Minami no teiô: Supesharu gekijô-ban	Ryôko	
1995	The King of Minami: The Special Movie	Ryoko	
1992	Yonigeya hompo	Cast	
1990	Fûsen		
1988	Ikidomari no Banka (Break Out)	Miku Sawano	
1987	Shuto shôshitsu	Matsunaga Mieko	

Television series
Year	Title	Role	Reference
2020	Ochoyan	Kiku Tomikawa	
October 3, 2016	Beppinsan	Kotoko Murata	
2023	Akinai Seiden: Kin to Gin	お竹	
2023	Mai Sekando Aoharu	Shiratama Kumiko	
2023	Jiken	Cast	
2022	ISHIKO and HANEO: You're Suing Me?		
2021	Stories Within 5 Meters Radius	Shoko	
2020	High Position 1986	天野幸子	
2019	Detective Zero	Asuka Enjo	
2018	Unnatural	敷島直美	
2017	Reverse (JP)	Hiroko Ochi	
2015	Dating: What's it like to be in love?	Cast	
2014	Kono Mystery ga Sugoi!: Bestseller Sakka kara no Chôsenjô	Cast	
2012	Akai ito no onna	Toyoko Akagi	
2012	Kaidan Shin Mimibukuro - Igyô		
2012	Solitary Gourmet		
2012	Heart Beat	cast	
2011	Garo: Makai Senki	Toshiko Hoshikawa	
2011	Sakura shinjuu		
2010	Softball Boys		
2008	Samurai Gangsters		
2008	Yûbae Shôjo	Cast	
2006	Strawberry Shortcakes	Doctor	
2005	One Missed Call		
2005	Garo		
2000	AIBOU	Nijiko Hakamada	
1999	The Woman of S.R.I.	Cast	
1978	The Unfettered Shogun	Okyo	

Fuji TV - Monday Drama Land
Year	Title	Role	Reference
August 19, 1985	Transfer Student! I'm Him and He's Me		
December 12, 1985	Cyborg High School Girl Vanilla 37°C	Vanilla Amai	
April 21, 1986	Transfer Student! I'm Him and He's Me 2		
January 6, 1986	Sailor Suit Love Classroom Love Lessons A!B!!C!?		
	Summer Vacation Special Projects: Dear Milk House	Female College Student	
August 3, 1987	Zenryaku Milk House	Serika Matsumoto	
1987	TV Man in the Wilderness		

== See also ==
- Teddy Boy Blues
