= Kokoro Button =

Japanese shōjo manga series by Maki Usami

ココロ・ボタン
- Genre: Romance, slice of life
- Manga
- Written by: Maki Usami
- Published by: Shogakukan
- Imprint: Flower Comics
- Magazine: Betsucomi
- Original run: May 13, 2009 – November 13, 2013
- Volumes: 12

Kokoro Button (Japanese: ココロ・ボタン; lit. "Heart Button") is a Japanese shōjo manga series written and illustrated by Maki Usami. It was serialized in Shogakukan's Betsucomi magazine from the June 2009 issue (released on May 13) to the December 2013 issue (released on November 13). Shogakukan collected the individual chapters into 12 bound volumes under the Flower Comics imprint; the first volume was released on October 26, 2009, and the last volume was released on April 25, 2014. The series is licensed in France by Soleil Manga and in Germany by Egmont Manga & Anime.

In 2016, the Japanese video distribution service dTV adapted Kokoro Button into a "movie comic", a series of videos containing animated panels from the manga with music and voice acting. The roles of Niina Kasuga and Eito Koga were played by Yoshino Aoyama and Shunichi Toki, respectively.

== Reception ==
Volume 5 has sold 52,749 copies (as of May 1, 2011), volume 6 has sold 62,365 copies (as of October 2, 2011), volume 7 has sold 80,140 copies (as of March 4, 2012), volume 8 has sold 106,014 copies (as of September 9, 2012), and volume 9 has sold 92,277 copies (as of March 9, 2013).
