= Joō no Hana =

Japanese fantasy romance manga series by Kaneyoshi Izumi

- Volume 1 cover art

女王の花
- Genre: Fantasy, historical, romance,
- Manga
- Written by: Kaneyoshi Izumi
- Published by: Shogakukan
- Imprint: Flower Comics
- Magazine: Betsucomi
- Original run: October 13, 2007 – December 13, 2016
- Volumes: 15

Joō no Hana (Japanese: 女王の花; lit. "The Queen's Flower") is a Japanese historical romance manga series written and illustrated by Kaneyoshi Izumi. The story revolves around Aki, a cheerful princess who is treated coldly by others, despite her royal title. One day, Aki meets Hakusei, a slave boy with golden hair and blue eyes. The two form a bond, overcoming their differences in status; however, danger awaits them.

The manga premiered in Shogakukan's Betsucomi magazine in the November 2007 issue (released on October 13). It was serialized on an irregular basis until the June 2010 issue (released on May 13), after which it was serialized every other month. The final chapter was published in the January 2017 issue (released on December 13, 2016). Shogakukan collected the individual chapters into fifteen bound volumes under the Flower Comics imprint from August 26, 2008, to March 24, 2017. The manga is licensed in France by Kazé Manga.

In 2015, Joō no Hana won the 60th Shogakukan Manga Award for Best Shōjo Manga.

== Volumes ==
No.	Japanese release date	Japanese ISBN
1	August 26, 2008	978-4-09-132009-4
2	July 26, 2010	978-4-09-133383-4
3	January 26, 2011	978-4-09-133654-5
4	July 26, 2011	978-4-09-133690-3
5	January 26, 2012	978-4-09-134308-6
6	August 24, 2012	978-4-09-134500-4
7	February 26, 2013	978-4-09-135085-5
8	August 26, 2013	978-4-09-135449-5
9	February 26, 2014	978-4-09-135764-9
10	August 26, 2014	978-4-09-136312-1
11	February 26, 2015	978-4-09-136820-1
12	August 26, 2015	978-4-09-137649-7
13	February 26, 2016	978-4-09-138289-4
14	August 26, 2016	978-4-09-138479-9
15	March 24, 2017	978-4-09-139124-7

== Reception ==
Volume 2 reached the 14th place on the weekly Oricon manga charts and, as of August 1, 2010, has sold 45,260 copies; volume 3 reached the 12th place and, as of January 30, 2011, has sold 42,495 copies; volume 4 reached the 18th place and, as of July 31, 2011, has sold 45,389 copies; volume 5 reached the 17th place and, as of February 5, 2012, has sold 64,506 copies; volume 6 reached the 26th place and, as of August 26, 2012, has sold 33,083 copies; volume 7 reached the 11th place and, as of March 9, 2013, has sold 71,625 copies; volume 8 reached the 19th place and, as of September 1, 2013, has sold 59,147 copies; volume 9 reached the 13th place and, as of March 9, 2014, has sold 67,088 copies; volume 10 reached the 17th place and, as of August 31, 2014, has sold 47,811 copies; and volume 11 reached the 27th place and, as of March 1, 2015, has sold 40,701 copies.

The series has a staff grade of 15.47 out of 20 on the French manga website Manga-News.com.

In 2015, Joō no Hana won the 60th Shogakukan Manga Award for Best Shōjo Manga.
