= Black Bird (manga) =

Japanese shōjo manga series by Kanoko Sakurakoji

- First tankōbon volume cover
- Genre: Dark fantasy; Romance
- Manga
- Written by: Kanoko Sakurakoji
- Published by: Shogakukan
- English publisher: NA: Viz Media
- Imprint: Flower Comics
- Magazine: Betsucomi
- English magazine: NA: Shojo Beat
- Original run: July 13, 2006 – December 13, 2012
- Volumes: 18

Black Bird (stylized in all caps) is a Japanese manga series written and illustrated by Kanoko Sakurakoji. It was serialized in Shogakukan's shōjo manga magazine Betsucomi from July 2006 to December 2012 and published in 18 bound volumes from January 2007 to April 2013. The story depicts the life of a high school girl who can see supernatural beings.

Viz Media licensed the series for an English-language release in North America. The first chapter was previewed in their now-defunct Shojo Beat magazine in 2008. Viz published all 18 volumes from August 2009 to March 2014. In Japan, it was adapted into a drama CD, a light novel, and a stage play. Sakurakoji also published a new one-shot chapter of the manga in Betsucomi's May 2019 issue (released on April 12).

In 2009, Black Bird won the 54th Shogakukan Manga Award in the shōjo manga category. According to ICv2, Black Bird was the sixth best-selling manga series in the United States for 2011.

== Plot ==
Misao sees things that other people cannot. Normally, the monsters would do harmless things. But suddenly, on her sixteenth birthday, the creatures she sees take it further by trying to kill her. She is saved by a childhood friend from her past, Kyo Usui, who just so happens to be a demon, or yōkai, as well as the clan leader of the tengu. She finds out that she is the rare "Bride of Prophecy", also known as "The Senka" or "The Holy Fruit", and depends on Kyo for protection from those who wish to eat her for her blood, which gives the consumer incredible power. She further gets to know that marrying her brings immense prosperity to the whole demon clan of the groom and is thus the object of conflict among the clan leaders of different demon clans, who want to be her suitors. Kyo wants to marry her but to do so he has to put more than just his life at stake. Moreover, the "Senkaroku", or "Record of the Holy Fruit", restricts their love.

== Characters ==
=== Main characters ===
Misao Harada (原田 実沙緒, Harada Misao)
Misao is a sixteen-year-old high school student. She has been plagued with the ability to see demons ever since birth. Because of her ability, she was never able to make any friends until she met Kyō. The monsters were harmless until her sixteenth birthday; on the day she turned sixteen, a monster possessing one of the school's idols attacks her. Before she was injured any further, Kyō came to save her and healed her wound by licking it. It is then that she discovers that he is a demon and that she is the "bride of the prophecy" for the head of the Tengu Clan; she was chosen to be the wife of the next head of the clan ten years ago. When she was a child, Misao became attached to Kyo and they had made a promise that she would be his bride. However, she was supposed to marry Kyo's older brother, Sho, who was the heir to the clan. As a result, Kyo left Misao's side in order to surpass him and become the heir. At first, she was scared of Kyo for his stoic personality and demonic powers but grows to trust that he is willing to do anything to be with her. She later falls in love with Kyo and decides to fulfill her promise to him by becoming his wife, once she graduates high school. They begin a romantic and sexual relationship from then on. After Sho's death, Misao notices a change in her powers, which no one is able to touch her and her scent is overwhelming. It is discovered that this is because Misao is pregnant with a demon child. Despite being told the baby could kill her during childbirth, she refuses to abort it because she has grown to love her unborn child. Misao gives birth to a boy whom she named Sou. Instead of dying, a miracle happens when Misao wakes up, and even though it costs her most of her ability to walk, she is able to live happily with Kyo and Sou.
Kyou Usui (烏水 匡, Usui Kyō)
Kyo is the heir to the Tengu Clan. It is revealed that Kyo is not human but a powerful demon. When he is in his demon form, his hair grows longer, he has black wings, and he wears a mask that looks like a crow's beak. He is perverted and cocky to most people, but he treats Misao with a combination of kindness and coldness depending on his mood. Kyo met Misao during their childhood; they quickly developed a strong bond and he fell in love with her. They also made a promise that she would be his bride, which he is determined to fulfill. His older brother, Sho, was supposed to be the clan leader, but Kyo surpassed him for Misao's sake (as only a clan leader may seek her as their bride). In order to stay close to Misao, he moved back to his house next door to hers and took a job as a math teacher at her school. He is always protecting her and healing her wounds, and finding moments to steal a kiss from her. While he cares deeply for Misao, Kyo has deep attachments to those close to him: such that he took Taro under his wings to train him and make him stronger after Taro was abused by Sho. Kyo has deep disdain towards his brother (for his abusive ways) and his father (whom he suspects of murdering his mother). After Sho's death, Kyo learns that Misao is pregnant with his child, a powerful demon. He is initially happy about the news, but when he learns that the children of the Immortal Fruit will feed on their mothers after childbirth, he wants her to abort the pregnancy but she refuses. When Misao tells him that she loves the baby and it loves her, he comes to care for the baby. Misao gives birth to a boy, whom they name Sou. Misao, due to a miracle, survives and Kyo is able to live happily with her and Sou.

=== Tengu Clan members ===
Sou Usui
Misao and Kyo's son. He is the current heir to the Tengu clan. He resembles Kyo greatly and acts like him. He is born in the final chapter. According to the Immortal Fruit Record, children of the Immortal Fruit will kill their mothers soon after birth. As a result, Kyo wanted Misao to abort the baby, but she refused. After discovering her pregnancy, Misao had recurring dreams of a little boy with black wings and introduces himself as Sou, and discovers that it is her unborn son. Kyo comes to care about the baby once Misao tells him that Sou loves him. When he is born, Misao survives the childbirth, and Misao and Kyo begin raising Sou as a family. Although he is well-loved by both of his parents, Sou is jealous that his father loves his mother more, and complains how strict Kyo is with him while Misao is very loving.
Yoh Usui
Kyo's father and the former head of the Tengu Clan. He married Yuri, who was eleven years his junior, and through their marriage, Sho and Kyo were born. He is rarely present in the family and acts indifferent towards his sons. Kyo believes that he does not love or care for him, his brother, and his mother. Kyo initially believes that his father murdered his mother after they engaged in a heated argument, but this turns out to be false, and Yoh actually feels guilty for his wife's death because he feels it was his fault. Despite this, neither Kyo or Sho have any sympathy for their father. He is determined to have one of his sons marry Misao and father an heir for the clan. He is very fond of Misao, whom he remembers from her childhood.
Yuri Usui
Kyo's mother. She is Yoh's wife, and eleven years his junior. Her marriage to Yoh was always troubling. Before she died, she had a physical argument with Yoh, and soon after, she died from poisoning. This causes Kyo to believe Yoh murdered her, but it turns out that she had actually committed suicide out of grief for causing her husband to lose leadership of the clan because of her concerns for Kyo and Sho.
Sho Usui (烏水 祥/僧正, Usui Sho)
Kyo's older brother, and original heir to the Tengu Clan. He is 22-years-old when he is first introduced. Once the clan realized how cruel he is, Kyo became the heir. When he was the heir, he was supposed to marry Misao. However, he is very cruel to her and does not love her, and even slapped her as a child. He hates that his brother was always there in case he failed to harm Misao. The previous Clan Leader called Kyo "the spare tire" or "back-up plan" because Sho was deemed unfit as the heir due to his abusive and cruel nature. While he despises Misao, he hates that she chose Kyo over him because it made him feel useless to the clan. In later chapters, however, he shows an emotional side, as he saves Misao from being crushed to death inside a storage house. He is later brought back to life by the efforts of his former attendant Roh. In the last battle between the two brothers, he is killed, but warns Kyo that he would not be like him and kill Misao, implying that he read the last pages of the Immortal Fruit Record.
Taro
One of the eight daitengu. He has two brothers, Jiro and Saburo, and they are triplets. They are six years old. After nearly being killed by Sho, Kyo trained him to become stronger. He enjoys cooking and preparing food for Kyo and Misao, and tending to the flowers in the courtyard, despite how much Kyo does not like plants that are grown by others.
Jiro
One of the eight daitengu. He is the triplet brother of Taro and Saburo. He resembles Kyo almost as if they are related, which they are not. He loves Misao as a big sister figure and likes seeing her smile. He is later put in charge of taking care of Sou, which annoys him, as Sou tends to hide from and refuse to listen to him.
Saburo
One of the eight daitengu. He is the triplet brother of Taro and Jiro. He has bushy dark hair, and enjoys doing things for Kyo and Misao.
Sagami (real name Ryo)
Another of the eight daitengu. He is very protective of Kyo, and dislikes Misao at first but he later grows to like her due to her caring personality. He is Hoki's older brother. He has a sickly wife named Ayame, who was later cured by drinking Misao's blood. He is 24 years old and trained the daitengu to fight. Years later, he and Ayame have a son, Ryu, and a daughter, Tsubaki. He and Hoki are the last daitengu to serve Kyo.
Hoki (real name Yu)
Another of the eight daitengu, and Sagami's younger brother. He is 15 years old and he looks very feminine. He is very loyal to Kyo and Misao. By the end of the series, he and Sagami are the last daitengu to serve Kyo.
Buzen
Another one of the eight daitengu who's a playboy but a mature person. He is 26 years old. He had loved Kyo and Sho's mother because he considered her to be the most beautiful woman he had ever seen, although he continues to flirt with other young women. A few years after Sou is born, Buzen quits the daitengu and left for an unknown position.
Zenki (real name Gou)
Another one of the eight daitengu. Misao thinks he is scary but an easy-going and funny person. He is 20 years old. He loves and protects children who lost their families. A few years after Sou is born, Zenki quits the daitengu and undergoes training to be a monk at an orphanage.

=== Supporting characters ===
Shuhei Kuzunoha
Leader of the Kitsune Clan. He is killed by Kyo when they fought for Misao's love.
Tadanobu Kuzunoha
Kyo's childhood friend. They met completely by accident, and formed a friendship based on their shared love of porn. He allowed his younger brother Shuhei to beat him when they fought for the leadership of the Kitsune Clan, because he never wanted to fight his best friend. He is in love with a human girl named Renko. After Kyo kills Shuhei, he becomes the head of the Kitsune Clan. Eventually, he is forced to challenge Kyo for Misao, but loses. However, he is allowed to live.
Renko Jounouchi
A human girl who attends the university that Misao's father teaches at. She is Tadanobu's lover, and will do anything to protect him. She even goes as far as to threaten to kill Kyo if he hurts Tadanobu. She has competed in archery tournaments in the past. Eventually, she is accepted by the Kitsune Clan. Only Tadanobu is allowed to call her Ren.
Yoshio Harada
Misao's father. He is a university professor and participates in digs. He teaches Renko, who attends the same university. He is very protective of Misao, but says that he will accept Kyo as her boyfriend if he makes her happy. When Misao becomes pregnant, he is happy and encourages her and Kyo to be happy with their child, Sou, whom he dotes on.
Yoko Harada
Misao's mother. She remembers Kyo from his and Misao's childhood and trusts him a lot, despite knowing little about him. She is initially upset when Misao becomes pregnant, but agrees to let her and Kyo marry. In chapter 69, she discovers Kyo's secret as a demon when he saves her; however, she believes that Kyo will be a good husband to Misao and father to Sou.
Kensuke Dodoji
A snake demon, and heir to his clan. He is very shy, unlike his twin sister Kiyo. He becomes friends with Misao, but is supposed to take her as his own. However, he is much too softhearted to do this. He gives Misao poison, which she uses to paralyze Sho.
Kiyo Dodoji
Another snake demon, and Kensuke's twin sister. She is in love with Kyo, and will do anything to get him. She is very beautiful. She shows up at Misao's school, and asks her to give up Kyo.
Ayame
Sagami's wife. She is very sickly, but gets extremely excited when Sagami gets a chance to visit her. She is cured by drinking some of Misao's blood. She has the power to show images in a pool of water. She watched over Misao, while Kyo was away from her for ten years. She also watched over Sho, and he learned this skill just by watching her. She began to like Ryo when she was 15 years old. He was not her first crush but the first person she ever kissed. Years later, they have a son and a daughter, Ryu and Tsubaki.
Raikoh Watanabe
Like Misao he can see demons and spirits, and is also in love with her. However, he refuses to believe that humans and demons can live in harmony and uses his abilities to destroy them. Due to this, despite Misao and Kyo's attempts to prove that not all demons are like the one who scarred him, due to his attempts to destroy their relationship, ignoring the fact his actions put them both in grave danger, it looks like they will forever be on bad terms.
Roh
The man who resurrected Sho after he was trapped under the storage house. He was Sho's servant until he died while resurrecting Sho. He has a daughter named Kaede.
Kaede
Her father Roh supported Sho's ambitions to seize clan leadership. She is Sho's attendant, after he returns to the village. She was abandoned by her parents as a child and became an outcast in the village because of it. She also fell in love with Kyo because he was outcast by the village for trying to become the new clan head. She develops a strong hatred for Misao because of her feelings for Kyo. She later commits suicide in an attempt to prevent Sho's death, showing twisted feelings of love for him.

== Media ==
=== Manga ===
Written and illustrated by Kanoko Sakurakoji, Black Bird was serialized in Shogakukan's monthly shōjo manga magazine Betsucomi from the August 2006 issue (released on July 13) to the January 2013 issue (released on December 13, 2012). Shogakukan collected the individual chapters into 18 tankōbon (bound volumes) under the Flower Comics imprint. The first volume was released on January 26, 2007, and the last volume was released on April 26, 2013.

The manga is licensed in North America by Viz Media under the Shojo Beat imprint. The first print volume was released on August 4, 2009, and the last print volume was released on March 4, 2014. Viz also released the series in a collectible box set with an exclusive art book on October 21, 2014. Additionally, Black Bird is licensed in Taiwan by Tong Li Publishing, in France by Pika Édition, in Germany by Egmont Manga & Anime, and in Italy by Edizioni Star Comics.

In March 2019, Sakurakoji announced that she would publish a new one-shot chapter of Black Bird in Betsucomi's May issue (released on April 12).

==== Volumes ====
No.	Original release date	Original ISBN	English release date	English ISBN
1	January 26, 2007	978-4-091-30837-5	August 4, 2009	978-1-4215-2764-2
Chapters: 1–5
2	June 26, 2007	978-4-091-31085-9	November 3, 2009	978-1-4215-2765-9
Chapters: 6–9 Extra: Special Feature
3	October 26, 2007	978-4-091-31300-3	February 2, 2010	978-1-4215-2766-6
Chapters: 10–13 Extra: Special Feature
4	February 26, 2008	978-4-091-31437-6	May 4, 2010	978-1-4215-2767-3
Chapters: 14–17 Extra: Decade
5	June 26, 2008	978-4-091-31649-3	August 3, 2010	978-1-4215-2768-0
Chapters: 18–21 Extra: Sanctuary
6	October 24, 2008	978-4-091-32130-5	October 5, 2010	978-1-4215-3066-6
Chapters: 22–25 Extra: Bonus Manga
7	January 26, 2009	978-4-091-32208-1	February 1, 2011	978-1-4215-3311-7
Chapters: 26–28 Extra: Angels/Black Bird Gaiden And Ice
8	May 26, 2009	978-4-091-32374-3	May 3, 2011	978-1-4215-3580-7
Chapters: 29–32 Extra: Nightmare
9	November 26, 2009	978-4-091-32728-4	July 5, 2011	978-1-4215-3774-0
Chapters: 33–35 Extra: Little Black Bird Parts 1 & 2
10	March 26, 2010	978-4-091-32728-4	September 5, 2011	978-1-4215-3843-3
Chapters: 36–39 Extra: Black Bird Special Feature
11	July 26, 2010	978-4-091-33387-2	November 1, 2011	978-1-4215-3937-9
Chapters: 40–43
12	November 26, 2010	978-4-091-33508-1	January 3, 2012	978-1-4215-4052-8
Chapters: 44–47
13	April 26, 2011	978-4-091-33789-4	March 6, 2012	978-1-4215-4177-8
Chapters: 48–51 Extra: Black Bird New Year's Special
14	August 26, 2011	978-4-091-34032-0	June 5, 2012	978-1-4215-4275-1
Chapters: 52–53 Extra: Special Feature Taxie & Blue Extra: Black Bird Final Story Arc Chapter 1
15	January 26, 2012	978-4-091-34299-7	December 4, 2012	978-1-4215-4921-7
Chapters: 54–57
16	June 26, 2012	978-4-091-34499-1	May 7, 2013	978-1-4215-5243-9
Chapters: 58–61
17	November 26, 2012	978-4-09-134780-0	October 1, 2013	978-1-4215-5890-5
Chapters: 62–66
18	April 26, 2013	978-4-091-35254-5	March 4, 2014	978-1-4215-6009-0
Chapters: 67–72

=== Drama CD ===
Black Bird was adapted into a drama CD produced by Nippon Columbia and released in Japan on January 21, 2009. Artists on the drama CD include Kōki Miyata, Kishō Taniyama, Akira Ishida, Hiroyuki Yoshino, Takahiro Sakurai, Yuko Kagata, Takehito Koyasu, Kyoko Hikami and Mikako Takahashi.

=== Light novel ===
The series was also adapted into a light novel titled Black Bird: Missing, written by Yui Tokiumi and illustrated by Kanoko Sakurakoji. It was released on March 26, 2010.

=== Stage play ===
Black Bird was adapted into a stage play which ran at the Ginza Hakuhinkan Theater in Tokyo, Japan, from March 27 to March 31, 2019. It was directed by Makoto Kimura and written by Miwa Fujiyoshi. The play starred Fuyuna Asakura as Misao Harada and Yū Matsumura as Kyo Usui.

== Reception ==
Black Bird won the 54th Shogakukan Manga Award in the shōjo manga category in 2009.

The sixth volume of the manga was ranked 12th on the Japanese Comic Rankings between October 28 and November 3, 2008. The seventh volume was ranked 4th in its first week, selling 75,689 copies. The eighth volume was ranked in 3rd place during its first week and then fell to 27th in the second week of publication. Volume 9 of Black Bird sold a total of 100,014 in its first two weeks of publication, debuting at 11th place on the charts, then falling to 20th place in its second week. The tenth volume of the series debuted on the Oricon charts in 14th place, selling a total of 51,172 copies. The first volume was ranked 4th on the manga section of the New York Times Best Seller list on September 3, 2009. The second volume was ranked 7th on November 26, 2009, 9th on December 3, 2009, and 8th on January 7, 2010. According to ICv2, Black Bird was the sixth best-selling manga series in the United States for 2011.

Anime News Network's Casey Brienza commends the English edition of the manga for being "amusing and sexy. Good if you want to put your critical sensibilities into neutral with something trashy" however she criticises the manga with the comment "its creative horizons are that of a bodice ripper. Don't expect the next modern manga masterpiece." Katherine Dacey, writing for The Manga Critic, criticises Misao for not defending herself even as "demons slash her throat, poison her, push her off rooftops, and slam her against walls." Dacey comments that "younger readers may find [Kyo] sexy, but older readers will see him for what he is: a wolf in knight's clothing, posing as Misao's savior while manipulating her for his own selfish interests."
