= Doubt!! =

Japanese shōjo manga series by Kaneyoshi Izumi

- The cover of the first English volume of Doubt!! as published by Viz Media

ダウト!! (Dauto!!)
- Genre: Drama, romance
- Manga
- Written by: Kaneyoshi Izumi
- Published by: Shogakukan
- English publisher: NA: Viz Media
- Imprint: Flower Comics
- Magazine: Bessatsu Shōjo Comic
- Original run: February 2000 – June 2002
- Volumes: 6

Doubt!! (Japanese: ダウト!!, Hepburn: Dauto!!) is a Japanese shōjo manga series written and illustrated by Kaneyoshi Izumi. The story follows Ai Maekawa, a teenager who gives herself a total makeover during a school break in a bid to reinvent her image and become popular. It was serialized in Shogakukan's Bessatsu Shōjo Comic magazine from the March 2000 issue to the July 2002 issue. Shogakukan collected the individual chapters into six bound volumes under the Flower Comics imprint. Viz Media licensed the series for an English-language release in North America.

== Synopsis ==
Ai Maekawa was a jimi, or country bumpkin, in middle school. After a popular student embarrassed her by flipping her skirt up in public to reveal her unattractive, grandmotherly panties, Ai used the period between middle and high school to carry out a complete makeover. Between dieting, makeup and new clothes, Ai makes herself into a beauty. She enrolls in a school that she thinks no one from her middle school will choose so that she can start over. Imbued with newfound confidence, she decides to openly pursue the most handsome and popular boy in her class, Sô Ichinose. Ai's past is not so easily abandoned, however, and Ai finds out that popularity is more than skin deep as she attempts to win Sô's affections and make friends in a field of doubt.

== Characters ==
Ai Maekawa (前川 藍, Maekawa Ai)
The main protagonist of Doubt! She was originally a jimi, the Japanese equivalent of a geek/nerd/dork, in junior high. After a devastating and embarrassing event she decides to step up her game. A few months before her first year of high school, she says she "manufactures" herself into a beautiful young woman. Now getting everyone's attention she enters a roller coaster of a ride in high school. The very first day of school she meets Sô Ichinose and his friend Yuichiro Kato, known as the two hottest guys in school. Mina Sato doesn't seem to be very happy with Ai after watching her hanging out with the boys too much. She becomes Ai's enemy for the first few chapters, thinking that Ai was trying to hook up with Yūichirō, but after learning that she was actually after Sô, they become the best of friends. By the 2nd volume Ai and Sō enter a relationship. But unfortunately for Ai, things go far from what she had expected when Yūichirō announces that he is in fact in love with her too.
Sô Ichinose (一ノ瀬 曹, Ichinose Sō)
The most popular guy in school, who Ai has a crush on. The vulgar, bad guy type. According to him, he lost his virginity at age 12. He dated many girls just for the sake of engaging in sexual intercourse or just because he felt like it. This changes when he starts going out with Ai. He has a pretty harsh life at home. His father, a congressman, is actually not his real father. His mother feels guilty about this and tends to take out her anger on him. Nevertheless he still acts carefree all the time. He has been friends with Yuichiro ever since kindergarten and since then they have been in the same class.
Yuichiro Kato (加藤 雄一郎, Katō Yūichirō)
Ichinose's best friend, he seems to have a thing for Ai but hasn't acted on it. Mina's crazy for him but he seems scared of her after the little incident in junior high. He's been friends with Sô for a long time. He is the exact opposite of Sô, he tends to be more like a gentleman and is not a playboy like his friend. The reason he's such a gentleman to girls is because of his mother. She is pretty and though she may look harmless she actually has a deadly side. One time, in the manga when they were having a parent-teacher conference, Mina's mom had teased him about looking adorable. Of course he had snapped and dissed her. His mom quickly changed from sweet and kind to cold and harsh and warned him about disrespecting women. He falls for Ai and later actually tries to steal her away but he decides to back off a little seeing how much she loves Sô.
Mina Sato (佐藤 美菜, Satō Mina)
Mina is a trendy "ko-gal". She thought Ai was after Yuichiro, the guy she liked, so she turned the whole girl population against Ai. But later after she finds out Ai likes Ichinose and not Kato they become best friends. The reason why Yuichiro is afraid of her is actually because of an incident that happened when they were left in a classroom together in junior high. Yuichiro had tried to shy away from her though she never stops chasing after him. She is aware of his feelings for Ai. She hates that he does but there's one event in the manga where she tells him to just to tell Ai that he loves her. Mina is usually vulgar like Sô and like Ai said she has a tiger like personality and was ready to pounce any time. Her feelings for Yūichirō are very obvious and she knows so much about him, it almost looks like she's stalking him. Ai even says though Yuichiro will not admit it, Mina and he are very close and share a strong friendship. In fact, Yuichiro and Mina are seen together repeatedly throughout the series having their own private conversations about the events at school.
Yumi Sakata (坂田 ユミ, Sakata Yumi)
Ai idolized and envied her in junior high. She was also the one that embarrassed Ai in class and made her turn from a "jimi" (nerd) into a popular girl. She has a reunion with Ai and the two quarrel over Sô's affections.
Chiharu Hamano (浜野 ちはる, Hamano Chiharu)
A student teacher who seems to have dated Ichinose in the past. She wants him back and sees Ai as her enemy. She looks like a cute little bunny but her personality is the exact opposite. She's Ai's very first enemy in trying to capture Sô's affections. She leaves for a little while but says that she'll return as a full time teacher. She is extremely manipulative and will not stop at self-harm to get attention from Ichinose. She even throws herself down a flight of stairs in volume 1 and claims Ai pushed her. The author referred to Hamano as "Poisonous" in volume 3.
Kyoka Fujisawa (藤沢 京華, Fujisawa Kyōka)
The so called 'Queen' of her college campus. Kyoka is stunningly beautiful and men tend to flock to her. She's one of Sô's ex-girlfriends and Ai's next enemy. She explains to Ai that she can never be the 'only' girl for Sō. She adds that it's somewhat like a sisterhood when you date Sô. Ai declines to 'join' this 'sisterhood' and challenges her. Kyoka refers to Ai as "vanilla" when she first meets her. However, despite Kyoka's snobby attitude, she is actually a very emotionally fragile girl.
Sakurako
A girl who Ichinose's parents would like him to date. She has an English father and a Japanese mother. Sô and Sakurako engaged in sexual intercourse together at 15. Unlike Sô's other girlfriends, Sakurako is rather plain and not so physically attractive.
Shuko
Sakurako's cruel sister. She is a professional model who has delusions of grandeur. Sô also lost his virginity to her when he was 12 and she was 13.
Kuma
Kuma first appears in volume 4 on page 112. He is considered a "beast" due to his hirsutism. Because of his excessive body hair and giant unibrow, his classmates ridicule him. Ai decides to give him a makeover. But then Kuma interprets this act of kindness as love and decides to break up Ai and Sô.
Mimura
Mimura makes his appearance in volume 4. He is a new student at Ai's school. He is charming but he is also extremely manipulative and plots to break up Ai and Sô. In volume 6, readers meet his girlfriend Sako.

== Volumes ==
No.	Original release date	Original ISBN	North American release date	North American ISBN
1	August 24, 2000	4-09-137229-5	March 1, 2005	1-59116-908-9
Chapters 1–4; "The Day of Finals"
2	February 24, 2001	4-09-137230-9	May 16, 2005	1-59116-909-7
Chapters 5–8; "A Women's Path"; "Travel Essay: Hainan Island, The Hawaii of China"; "Love Letter from China"; "Bragging About My Hometown"
3	June 26, 2001	4-09-137271-6	July 5, 2005	1-59116-910-0
Chapters 9–13
4	February 26, 2002	4-09-137272-4	September 8, 2005	1-59116-984-4
Chapters 14–18; "Mysteries of Men"; "Creature Banzai!"
5	May 25, 2002	4-09-137273-2	November 8, 2005	1-4215-0055-8
Chapters 19–23; "Afterword"
6	August 23, 2002	4-09-137274-0	January 10, 2006	1-4215-0172-4
Chapters 24–28
