= Cold Game =

Japanese manga series

- First tankōbon volume cover

コールドゲーム (Kōrudo Gēmu)
- Genre: Fantasy
- Manga
- Written by: Kaneyoshi Izumi
- Published by: Shogakukan
- Magazine: Betsucomi
- Original run: July 13, 2017 – present
- Volumes: 11
- icon

Cold Game (Japanese: コールドゲーム, Hepburn: Kōrudo Gēmu), also known as Called Game, is a Japanese manga series written and illustrated by Kaneyoshi Izumi. It has been serialized in Shogakukan's shōjo manga magazine Betsucomi since July 2017.

== Publication ==
Written and illustrated by Kaneyoshi Izumi, Cold Game started in Shogakukan's shōjo manga magazine Betsucomi on July 13, 2017. Shogakukan has collected its chapters into individual tankōbon volumes. The first volume was released on February 9, 2018. As of April 10, 2026, eleven volumes have been released.

=== Volumes ===
No.	Release date	ISBN
1	February 9, 2018	978-4-09-139843-7
2	September 26, 2018	978-4-09-870143-8
3	May 10, 2019	978-4-09-870442-2
4	February 10, 2020	978-4-09-870753-9
5	March 10, 2021	978-4-09-871148-2; 978-4-09-943080-1 (SE)
6	November 10, 2021	978-4-09-871473-5
7	October 7, 2022	978-4-09-871781-1
8	September 8, 2023	978-4-09-872235-8
9	August 9, 2024	978-4-09-872581-6
10	August 8, 2025	978-4-09-873129-9
11	April 10, 2026	978-4-09-873313-2

== Reception ==
On Takarajimasha's Kono Manga ga Sugoi! list of best manga of 2019 for women readers, the series ranked 14th.
