= Yumiko Kawahara =

Japanese manga artist

Yumiko Kawahara 川原 由美子
- Born: April 20, 1960 (age 66) Hakodate, Hokkaido, Japan
- Area: Manga artist
- Awards: Shogakukan Manga Award for shōjo - Zenryaku Milk House

Yumiko Kawahara (川原 由美子, Kawahara Yumiko; born April 20, 1960) is a Japanese shōjo manga artist born in Hakodate, Hokkaido, Japan. She made her professional debut in 1978 with Kotchi muite Marie!! in the weekly Shōjo Comic, for which she won a Shogakukan New Artist Award. In 1985, she received the Shogakukan Manga Award for shōjo for Zenryaku Milk House (前略・ミルクハウス). She is best known in the United States as the author of Dolls, which was licensed by Viz Media.
