= Backstage Prince =

Japanese shōjo manga series by Kanoko Sakurakoji

- The cover of the first volume of Backstage Prince as published by Viz Media, featuring Ryusei and Mr. Ken

極付 楽屋裏王子 (Kiwametsuke Gakuya Ura Ōji)
- Genre: Romance
- Manga
- Written by: Kanoko Sakurakoji
- Published by: Shogakukan
- English publisher: NA: Viz Media
- Imprint: Flower Comics
- Magazine: Betsucomi; Deluxe Betsucomi
- English magazine: NA: Shojo Beat
- Original run: 2004 – 2005
- Volumes: 2

Backstage Prince (Japanese: 極付 楽屋裏王子, Hepburn: Kiwametsuke Gakuya Ura Ōji) is a Japanese shōjo manga series written and illustrated by Kanoko Sakurakoji. It was serialized in Shogakukan's Betsucomi and Deluxe Betsucomi magazines from 2004 to 2005. Shogakukan later collected the individual chapters into two bound volumes under the Flower Comics imprint. Viz Media licensed the manga for an English-language release in North America, first serialized in their Shojo Beat magazine from October 2006 to March 2007 and later published in two volumes in March and June 2007, respectively. The manga is also licensed in Germany by Egmont Manga & Anime.

== Plot ==
Akari is an average high school girl who fails to see why the other girls in her school are so interested in Ryusei, a young, talented kabuki actor also attending their school. Akari happens to run into Ryusei and accidentally ends up bruising him in the stomach with her bookbag. Later, by chance, Akari ends up following a cat all the way to a kabuki theatre and runs into Ryusei once again.

To make up for her mistake, she volunteers to become Ryusei's assistant until he is healed. The reclusive and socially inept Ryusei accepts only because Akari gets along with his pet cat, the very one she followed all the way to the theatre. When Ryusei is finally better, Akari realizes she has fallen in love with him and Ryusei has also come to reciprocate.

However, their relationship is put to the test by Ryusei's profession and popularity and those who disapprove of their relationship, especially Ryusei's strict father and Naoki, another kabuki actor who loves Akari.

== Characters ==
Akari (あかり)
The protagonist, who is in love with Ryusei. At first, she was not interested in boys like Ryusei and was even less interested in Kabuki. After a series of events, Akari becomes Ryusei's assistant and later his girlfriend. She does poorly on her exams due to running along with Ryusei's hectic schedule. When Ryusei's father refuses to accept her as Ryusei's fiancée, Akari inadvertently drives Ryusei away in her sadness but is engaged to Ryusei in the end.
Ryusei Horiuchi (堀内流星)
A handsome and talented Kabuki actor professionally known as Shonosuke Ichimura (Nihongo: 市村庄之助, Ichimura Shōnosuke). He is Akari's upperclassman in school but tends to be anti-social and avoids other people. He loves Akari and she is the only person he opens up to. He later announces on television that he intends to marry Akari. When she rejects him after his father refuses to accept their relationship, Ryusei becomes ill because he overworks himself. Upset, Akari cries and apologizes and notices Ryusei is crying as well. He, at one time, thinks of quitting kabuki so that he and Akari can have a normal relationship. His succession name as a kabuki actor is Shoen Ichimura (Nihongo: 市村松園, Ichimura Shōen). In the end, he is engaged to Akari.
Toshiya Ichimura (市村敏也)
An elite actor in the kabuki theatre and Ryusei's manager. He acts friendly toward Ryusei, despite Ryusei's anti-social behavior. He is the one who initially suggested that Akari become Ryusei's assistant and is constantly trying to help Ryusei become more open with other people. He is also Miyuki's younger brother.
Ryusei's father
Shozaemon Ichimura (Nihongo: 市村庄左衛門, Ichimura Shōzaemon), Ryusei's strict father, who disapproves of his son's relationship with Akari and refuses to allow them to date. He fails to see that Ryusei does not perform as well when Akari is not nearby. After Ryusei announces on television that Akari is his fiancée, Akari attempts to get permission from Ryusei's father to marry his son, who tells her she will never be good enough to marry his son since he is a "thoroughbred" in Rien.
Miyuki Ogawa (小川みゆき)
A beautiful kabuki actress and Toshiya's sister. She is very talented and also comes from a famous family from Rien. At Ryusei's request, she pretended to be his girlfriend so that the media would not bother Akari. Ryusei's father would like nothing more than for her to marry his son, despite Akari and Ryusei's relationship. She is quite friendly and somewhat devious when it comes to asking people for favors, such as rides around town.
Mr. Ken (ケンさん)
Ryusei's cat, who is actually smarter than he seems. He leads Akari to the Kabuki theater's backstage entrance, which results in her meeting with Ryusei. When Ryusei is busy, Akari takes care of Mr. Ken. Initially, Mr. Ken is the only one Ryusei feels comfortable around.
Naoki (ナオキ)
Another kabuki actor and Ryusei's rival for Akari's affection; he is not from a family who has traditionally performed kabuki and usually performs the role of women in plays. When Ryusei is away performing in London, Naoki befriends Akari and helps her learn more about Rien. As a result, Naoki causes a rift to form between Akari and Ryusei. When Naoki and Akari meet again, she ends up rejecting his offer to date him. Despite this, his feelings for her do not change and he continues to pursue her affections and helps her out when he can. He remarks that Akari and Ryusei's relationship resembles a Michiyuki, where two lovers are walking side by side to a sad fate.
