= Dengeki Daisy =

Japanese shōjo manga series by Kyousuke Motomi

- Cover of the first Japanese manga volume, featuring Tasuku Kurosaki (top) and Teru Kurebayashi (bottom)

電撃デイジ (Dengeki Deijī)
- Genre: Romance
- Manga
- Written by: Kyousuke Motomi
- Published by: Shogakukan
- English publisher: NA: Viz Media
- Imprint: Flower Comics
- Magazine: Betsucomi
- Original run: May 12, 2007 – October 12, 2013
- Volumes: 16
- Anime television series
- Directed by: Souta Ueno
- Written by: Sawako Hirabayashi
- Music by: Masaru Yokoyama
- Studio: Studio Deen
- Licensed by: Crunchyroll
- Original run: January 2027 – scheduled
- icon

Dengeki Daisy (Japanese: 電撃デイジー, Hepburn: Dengeki Deijī; lit. 'Electric Shock Daisy') is a Japanese manga series written and illustrated by Kyousuke Motomi. It was serialized in Shogakukan's Betsucomi magazine from May 2007 to October 2013. Shogakukan later collected the individual chapters into 16 bound volumes under the Flower Comics imprint. Viz Media licensed the series for an English-language release in North America. An anime television series adaptation produced by Studio Deen is set to premiere in January 2027.

== Plot ==
When Teru's older brother died, she was left with little more than a cellphone containing the address of an elusive character called Daisy, whom Teru's brother said would watch over her. Daisy became Teru's pillar of strength over the next few years, as he sent her encouraging words through his phone, whether inspiring or mere chatter, as she faces her life alone.

One afternoon, after bullies from the student council are mysteriously driven away, Teru accidentally breaks a school window, which results in her working for the grouchy, cruel school janitor named Tasuku Kurosaki. As Teru begins working for the unlikable school janitor, her feelings begin to surpass that of master and servant and she begins to question Daisy's true identity. Thus begins an unlikely friendship between a 16-year-old high school girl and a sly but smart 24-year-old man. As time goes by, the two become close and Teru falls for Kurosaki. What she does not know is that he has feelings for her too, but cannot return them for a number of reasons, the most important reason being that Kurosaki feels he caused her brother's death.

== Characters ==
=== Main characters ===
Teru Kurebayashi (紅林 照, Kurebayashi Teru)
Voiced by: Yoshino Aoyama
A 16-year-old high school student, Teru is a strong-willed and kind girl who is alone after her older brother dies. She is left only with a cellphone that her brother gave her, connecting her to Daisy, who becomes Teru's source of encouragement and support through email messages. Despite never meeting him face-to-face, Teru has absolute trust in him (although she does not have romantic feelings for him). When she accidentally breaks a window, Teru is forced to become the "servant" of the school janitor, Tasuku Kurosaki, to pay it off. As the manga progresses, Teru's once negative feelings towards Kurosaki grow into something more romantic. However, she becomes suspicious that Kurosaki is, in fact, Daisy, and that the phone her brother left her might be more than it appears.
Tasuku Kurosaki (黒崎 祐, Kurosaki Tasuku)
Voiced by: Taku Yashiro
A 24-year-old young man working as the school janitor. Kurosaki is often depicted smoking his favorite brand Philip Morris, drinking, and participating in violent acts. Despite his unpleasant attitude, he cares deeply for Teru, acting toward her with genuine kindness, and is extremely protective of her. Teru is initially unaware that Kurosaki is also Daisy, a computer hacker who worked with her brother, Souichirou, and has been entrusted with looking after her. He is described by Teru's friends to be very attractive, though he does not generally display his emotions. Much to his chagrin, he is often jokingly described as a pervert and a lolicon by his friends, as it is established among his closest companions that he has strong romantic feelings for Teru. Kurosaki has made it his mission to care for Teru on the request of his dying friend, Souichirou, though recently he has chosen to protect her as his true self, as well. Despite his strong feelings for her, Kurosaki believes that he has no right to love Teru as he is "the one that led her brother to his death." Throughout the manga, he struggles between his feelings towards her and his own conflicting memories regarding his complicated past as a hacker.

=== Supporting characters ===
Master
Voiced by: Setsuji Satō
Masuda (増田) is the manager of Ohanabatake, a Western-style tea house, often seen wearing a bandana and apron. Both Kurosaki, Riko, and a number of characters refer to him as "Master" ("Masutaa" as a play on words). Despite his cordial demeanor and tendency to tease Kurosaki about his relationship with Teru, the Master can be surprisingly frightening; Kurosaki admits that the Master is far scarier than he is. The Master is fully aware of Kurosaki's activities as Daisy and has watched over Kurosaki, even before either of them became acquainted with Souichirou Kurebayashi.
Riko Onizuka (鬼塚 理子, Onizuka Riko)
Voiced by: Yuka Terasaki
Riko Onizuka was a member of the design team that Teru's brother led, as well as his girlfriend. As a result, she regards Teru as a younger sister and they live together as housemates. Riko is friends with Kurosaki and often subtly serves as his adviser on his situation with Teru, frequently teasing him or acting violently toward him if she thinks he has acted inappropriately towards Teru. She is also the school counselor at Teru's high school. Riko is 30-years-old.
Kiyoshi Hasegawa (長谷川 清, Hasegawa Kiyoshi)
Kiyoshi is Teru's best friend and a classmate, as well as a scholarship student. He attempted to find out more about why Teru was left so impoverished after her brother's death, despite Souichirou's reputation as a brilliant engineer. However, he ended up endangering both himself and Teru, until he is saved by Kurosaki. An intelligent boy who is able to exercise discretion, the Master reveals to Kiyoshi the true identity of Daisy as a gesture of trust. Afterwards, Kurosaki employs Kiyoshi as a second "servant" and another set of eyes to protect Teru, though Kiyoshi does not hesitate to poke fun at Kurosaki's affection for Teru.
Kazumasa Andou (安藤 数正, Andō Kazumasa)
The Chairman of Teru and Kurosaki's high school, Andou is a former colleague of Daisy and Teru's brother. He initially appears as the substitute janitor for Kurosaki. While he appears as a comical character who often appears from odd, small, and dark places, such as vents and garbage cans, and enjoys being beaten up, Andou is serious whenever matters concerning Daisy arise and acts as the group's leader during investigations. His nickname, Andy, came from Souichirou.
Rena Ichinose (一之瀬 玲奈, Ichinose Rena)
The Student Council President, an attractive girl who leads the student council to bully scholarship students like Teru and Kiyoshi and privatize school facilities. She has a tendency to enter bad relationships with unsavory men. Thanks to Teru's kindness, she gradually stops bullying and entering bad relationships. Though Rena does not admit it, Teru becomes one of her first true friends, and she indirectly tries to help Teru develop her relationship with Kurosaki. It is hinted that she later has feelings for Kiyoshi.
Haruka Sawaguchi (沢口 遥, Sawaguchi Haruka)
One of Teru's classmates and friends, Haruka acts as the leader of sorts in Teru's group of friends and encourages Teru's relationship with Kurosaki. She is the first friend that Teru confides in with her knowledge that she is aware that Kurosaki and Daisy are the same person. Haruka is frequently the first to come to Teru's defense at school, often leading their other friends to follow suit. She is a member of the school's art club, track team, and ghost club.
Masumi Takeda (竹田 真澄, Takeda Masumi)
One of Daisy's former co-workers, described as persistent, but not terribly cunning. He comes to Teru's school as the new PC instructor and administrator for information management, but in truth hopes to get close to Teru to obtain her cellphone, believing it contains unreleased software Souichirou had been designing before his death. While his first attempt is thwarted by Kurosaki, Takeda chooses to stop harassing Teru because of her resolve and kindness after his second attempt. He subsequently becomes an infrequent ally to Daisy.

=== Others ===
Souichirou Kurebayashi (紅林 奏一郎, Kurebayashi Sōichirō)
Voiced by: Tomokazu Sugita
Souichirou Kurebayashi is the deceased brother of Teru Kurebayashi. Respected and admired as a very talented computer engineer, he led a team of engineers that included Tasuku Kurosaki and Riko Onizuka. Little is known about him, though he has been alternately shown as comically affectionate towards his sister and those he cares about, to being serious and empathetic. Before his death, Souichirou supposedly developed software that was to sell for a very high price but mysteriously disappeared. He forced the role of Daisy onto his friend Kurosaki. It is eventually revealed that Souichirou died of stomach cancer; instead of receiving treatment, Souichirou had invested his remaining time into solving the virus code Kurosaki had been forced to reproduce in order to save Kurosaki. In turn, Kurosaki is heavily burdened with the belief that he indirectly caused his friend's death.
Tetsuya Arai (新井 哲也, Arai Tetsuya)
The former information technology teacher and the system administrator of the school's information network. He was involved in a relationship with Rena and was an adviser to the Student Council. However, he used his position to embezzle funds from the school's budget until Teru solicits Daisy's help in order to expose Arai's corruption. Arai is fired soon afterward but is forced to become a pawn in a series of illegal activities targeting Daisy. Out of concern for Rena's safety, he approaches Teru to disclose information that would expose the organization's coercion.
Chiharu Mori (森 千春, Mori Chiharu)
Initially introduced as the attractive school nurse, Mori appears to be an air-headed woman who often makes blunt, thinly-veiled insults against Teru. However, Kurosaki gradually becomes suspicious of what Mori is capable of when she tries to use Teru to expose Daisy. In reality, she is actually the true culprit behind various attacks on Teru and Kurosaki, all to obtain information regarding a dangerous project that Kurosaki had been responsible for creating. Because she had been hired by Andou's predecessor as chairman of the school, her background is unknown. When her true identity is exposed, she disappears from the school and remains at large.
Akira (アキラ)
Voiced by: Kōhei Amasaki
A mysterious and eerie boy with an uncanny passing resemblance to Teru's older brother, Souichirou, and a wide grin that makes him appear maniacal. To conceal his appearance, he wears a hoodie and he usually carries a yo-yo around. His behavior is erratic and seemingly remorseless, though he is exceptionally attached and affectionate towards Chiharu Mori, whom he works with as an accomplice. Though he is later identified as a gifted hacker, Akira is a very poor operative due to his childish emotional state resulting from the special treatment he received until that point. Akira displays a vindictive interest in Teru and enjoys hurting her to try and upset Kurosaki, whom he blames for unknown reasons relating to his past. It is later revealed that he had been working for a man named "Antler" in order to obtain M's Testament.
Hideo Midorikawa (緑川 秀雄, Midorikawa Hideo)
Professor Hideo Midorikawa is a colleague of Souichirou Kurebayashi. He is known to be a good father figure to Souichirou, but he is also said to be the cause of the death of Kurosaki's father when he exposed him as a spy. He had a close relationship with Akira, who he viewed as a surrogate grandson.
Takahiro Kurosaki (黒崎 孝弘, Kurosaki Takahiro)
Father of Kurosaki. He was a notable government official involved with creating regulations for computer programming codes being created and distributed for encryption and security. He also worked with Souichirou and Professor Midorikawa. Takahiro was accused of being a spy by a political opponent, and later died in suspicious circumstances. After witnessing his father's death, Kurosaki vowed he would take vengeance, which made him create the virus Jack o' Frost, as the hacker Daisy.
Antler (アントラ, Antora)
A sinister man associated with the revival of the Jack o' Frost computer virus originally created by Tasuku Kurosaki. Although he appears to be employing Akira and Chiharu Mori, Antler himself is a mercenary in the service of others seeking sabotage and assassinations of their opponents. He is responsible for the death of Professor Midorikawa and Takahiro Kurosaki and continues to thwart attempts to find "M's Testament" and Akira's origins.
Teru's friends
Teru's other friends include a helmet-hair girl named Kako (カコ) and buck-teeth boy named Ken (ケン) who like each other, as well as an overweight boy named Yoshi (良), and a girl who pulls her bangs back and wears her hair in a ponytail named Mei (芽衣). A comical group who support one another, they look to Teru as their leader and are very loyal to her and to each other.

== Media ==
=== Manga ===
Written and illustrated by Kyousuke Motomi, Dengeki Daisy was serialized in Shogakukan's monthly shōjo manga magazine Betsucomi from the June 2007 issue (released on May 12, 2007) to the November 2013 issue (released on October 12, 2013). The individual chapters were collected into 16 tankōbon (bound volumes) by publisher Shogakukan.

The series is licensed for an English-language release in North America by Viz Media. It is also licensed for regional language releases in Taiwan by Ever Glory Publishing, in France by Kazé Manga, and in Italy by Flashbook Edizioni.

==== Volumes ====
No.	Original release date	Original ISBN	North American release date	North American ISBN
1	October 26, 2007	9784091308542	July 6, 2010	9781421537276
Chapter 1: That man—is he trustworthy?; Chapter 2: Even if for an instant, a hero!; Chapter 3: I'm still green.; Chapter 4: That man—near yet so far; Dengeki Daisy Extra
2	March 26, 2008	9784091314550	October 5, 2010	9781421537283
Chapter 5: I'll be close to you when the time comes.; Chapter 6: Miss, there's been an incident.; Chapter 7: I will protect him.; Chapter 8: Close friend; Chapter 9: The hero's at that age...
3	August 26, 2008	9784091320070	December 28, 2010	9781421537290
Chapter 10: You won't be here.; Chapter 11: Thank you, always.; Chapter 12: Inside that cell phone; Chapter 13: The moment of truth; Chapter 14: Secret
4	January 26, 2009	9784091322104	April 5, 2011	9781421537306
Chapter 15: To become a dishonest woman; Chapter 16: Which is it you feel?; Chapter 17: The name of that flower; Chapter 18: The fourth man; Chapter 19: What I can do for you
5	June 26, 2009	9784091323958	July 5, 2011	9781421537399
Chapter 20: To the one I love dearly; Chapter 21: The first...; Chapter 22: Each and every hurt; Chapter 23: Losing something in order to protect it; Chapter 24: Stay by my side
6	February 26, 2010	9784091327741	September 6, 2011	9781421538266
Chapter 25: Best in the world; Chapter 26: Kiss; Chapter 27: Determination; Chapter 28: Possibility of a happy ending; Chapter 29: No match for cute girls; Extra Chapter: Holy night cosplay legend; Extra Chapter: Everyone's happy new year
7	July 26, 2010	9784091333841	November 1, 2011	9781421539416
Chapter 30: I'm the only one who knows; Chapter 31: What was taken from me; Chapter 32: A lost child's heart; Chapter 33: I'll be able to see you; Chapter 34: Truth rears its head
8	October 26, 2010	9784091334794	January 3, 2012	9781421539973
Chapter 35: Be happy; Chapter 36: Memorable song; Chapter 37: Two men; Chapter 38: The start of the "sin"; Chapter 39: The day "Daisy" was born
9	April 26, 2011	9784091337900	March 6, 2012	9781421541761
Chapter 40: Reunion; Chapter 41: Sin's whereabouts; Chapter 42: I want to feel you; Chapter 43: You've got mail; Chapter 44: A ghost appears
10	September 26, 2011	9784091340375	July 3, 2012	9781421542676
Chapter 45: Trial and Tribulation; Chapter 46: Just looking pretty doesn't work; Chapter 47: Daisy Bell; Chapter 48: Rena's fiancé; Chapter 49: Bury the frustration in your heart
11	March 26, 2012	9784091343161	January 1, 2013	9781421550602
Chapter 50: It's too soon to become a man; Chapter 51: A dangerous love game; Chapter 52: A last testament, an answer, and friendship; Chapter 53: With our friendship on the line; Chapter 54: A child's decision, an adult's resolve
12	June 26, 2012	9784091345530	May 7, 2013	9781421552422
Chapter 55: Crush his plot (Part 1); Chapter 56: Crush his plot (Part 2); Chapter 57: Footsteps from the past...; Chapter 58: That day grows nearer; Chapter 59: With our conviction
13	January 25, 2013	9784091350800	December 3, 2013	9781421559667
Chapter 60: I depend on you; Chapter 61: Attack; Chapter 62: Feelings and pain; Chapter 63: A message from Soichiro (Part 1); Chapter 64: A message from Soichiro (Part 2)
14	June 26, 2013	9784091352675	June 3, 2014	9781421569444
Chapter 65: Professor Midorikawa's will; Chapter 66: What was entrusted; Chapter 67: Because time is precious; Chapter 68: The decision to be happy; Chapter 69: Time to move
15	October 25, 2013	9784091356505	November 4, 2014	9781421573434
Chapter 70: Unbreakable heart; Chapter 71: Good luck charm; Chapter 72: My hero will come!; Chapter 73: Our future; Chapter 74: Let's go home together
16	February 26, 2014	9784091357601	April 7, 2015	9781421577715
Final Chapter: To Our Future; Bonus Feature: To the Tip of the Nails; Bonus Feature: New Year's; Bonus Chapter: Daisy Special Episode Part 1; Bonus Chapter: Daisy Special Episode Part 2; No-Good Cupid [Debut Story]

=== Anime ===
An anime television series adaptation was announced by Aniplex on June 9, 2026. The series will be produced by Studio Deen and directed by Souta Ueno, with Sawako Hirabayashi writing scripts and handling series composition, Ayaka Murakami designing the characters, and Masaru Yokoyama composing the music. It is set to premiere in January 2027 and will run for two consecutive cours. Crunchyroll will stream the series.

== Reception ==
In the 2011 About.com Manga Readers' Choice Awards, Dengeki Daisy was voted as the best new shōjo manga series of 2010 by North American fans.
