= Shogakukan Manga Award =

Japanese manga awards

- Awarded for: Manga
- Country: Japan
- First award: 1955
- Website: Official website

The Shogakukan Manga Award (Japanese: 小学館漫画賞, Hepburn: Shōgakukan Mangashō) is one of Japan's major manga awards, and is sponsored by Shogakukan Publishing. It has been awarded annually for serialized manga and features candidates from a number of publishers. It is the oldest manga award in Japan, being given since 1955.

== Categories ==
Until 2022, the award categories were:

- Children's (児童向け部門, Jidō muke bumon)
- Boy's (少年向け部門, Shōnen muke bumon)
- Girl's (少女向け部門, Shōjo muke bumon)
- General (一般向け部門, Ippan muke bumon)

Each winning work will be honored with a bronze statuette called "Minori", designed by Shigeru Nakano; a certificate, and a monetary prize. Special awards are also occasionally given out for outstanding work, lifetime achievement, and so forth.

== Recipients ==
The laureates were awarded for comics published during the years listed in the table. However, the laureates were not presented and the prizes were not given out until the beginning of the following year. The prizes are often referred to by the numbers listed below instead of the years. Since the 69th edition, the nominees are not divided into categories.

=== 1955–2022 ===
#	Year	General	Shōnen (boys)	Shōjo (girls)	Children	Ref.
1	1955	Būtan by Noboru Baba	No specific award given	No specific award given	No specific award given	
2	1956	Oyama no Kaba-chan by Eijo Ishida	No specific award given	No specific award given	No specific award given	
3	1957	Manga Seminar on Biology and Biiko-chan by Osamu Tezuka	No specific award given	No specific award given	No specific award given	
4	1958	Little Black Sambo and Shiawase no Ōji by Tarō Senba	No specific award given	No specific award given	No specific award given	
5	1959	Korisu no Pokko by Jirō Ōta; Bonko-chan and Fuichin-san by Toshiko Ueda (tie)	No specific award given	No specific award given	No specific award given	
6	1960	No award given	No specific award given	No specific award given	No specific award given	
7	1961	Science-kun no Sekai Ryokō by Reiji Aki	No specific award given	No specific award given	No specific award given	
8	1962	Susume Roboketto and Tebukuro Tecchan by Fujio Fujiko	No specific award given	No specific award given	No specific award given	
9	1963	Fight Sensei and Stop! Nii-chan by Hisashi Sekitani	No specific award given	No specific award given	No specific award given	
10	1964	Osomatsu-kun by Fujio Akatsuka	No specific award given	No specific award given	No specific award given	
11	1965	Paki-chan to Ganta by Kazuo Maekawa	No specific award given	No specific award given	No specific award given	
12	1966	No award given	No specific award given	No specific award given	No specific award given	
13	1967	Sabu to Ichi Torimono Hikae by Shotaro Ishinomori	No specific award given	No specific award given	No specific award given	
14	1968	Animal 1 and Inakappe Taishō by Noboru Kawasaki	No specific award given	No specific award given	No specific award given	
15	1969	Fire! by Hideko Mizuno	No specific award given	No specific award given	No specific award given	
16	1970	Glass no Shiro by Masako Watanabe; Gag Ojisan and Oya Baka Tengoku by Ryuzan Aki (tie)	No specific award given	No specific award given	No specific award given	
17	1971	Hana Ichimonme by Shinji Nagashima; Minashigo Hutch by Tatsuo Yoshida (tie)	No specific award given	No specific award given	No specific award given	
18	1972	Tōchan no Kawaii Oyome-san and Hashire! Boro by Hiroshi Asuna	No specific award given	No specific award given	No specific award given	
19	1973	Otoko Doahō Kōshien and Deba to Batto by Shinji Mizushima	No specific award given	No specific award given	No specific award given	
20	1974	The Drifting Classroom by Kazuo Umezu	No specific award given	No specific award given	No specific award given	
21	1975	Golgo 13 by Takao Saito	Poe no Ichizoku and They Were Eleven by Moto Hagio	No specific award given	No specific award given	
22	1976	Abu-san by Shinji Mizushima	Captain and Play Ball by Akio Chiba; Ganbare Genki by Yū Koyama (tie)	No specific award given	No specific award given	
23	1977	Notari Matsutaro by Tetsuya Chiba	Galaxy Express 999 and Senjo Manga Series by Leiji Matsumoto	No specific award given	No specific award given	
24	1978	Haguregumo by George Akiyama	Dame Oyaji by Mitsutoshi Furuya	No specific award given	No specific award given	
25	1979	Tosa no Ippon Tsuri by Yūsuke Aoyagi	To Terra... and Kaze to Ki no Uta by Keiko Takemiya		No specific award given	
26	1980	Hakatakko Junjō and Gangaragan by Hōsei Hasegawa; Jarinko Chie by Etsumi Haruki (tie)	Urusei Yatsura by Rumiko Takahashi		No specific award given	
27	1981	Sanchōme no Yūhi by Ryōhei Saigan	Dr. Slump by Akira Toriyama		Doraemon by Fujio Fujiko	
28	1982	Tsuribaka Nisshi by Jūzō Yamasaki and Ken'ichi Kitami	Miyuki and Touch by Mitsuru Adachi		Game Center Arashi and Kon'nichiwa! Mi-com by Mitsuru Sugaya	
29	1983	Hidamari no Ki by Osamu Tezuka	Musashi no Ken by Motoka Murakami	Kisshō Tennyo by Akimi Yoshida	Panku Ponk by Haruko Tachiiri	
30	1984	Human Crossing, Masao Yajima and Kenshi Hirokane	Futari Daka and Area 88 by Kaoru Shintani	Yume no Ishibumi by Toshie Kihara	Kinnikuman by Yudetamago	
31	1985	Bokkemon by Takashi Iwashige	Hatsukoi Scandal and Tobe! Jinrui II by Akira Oze	Zenryaku Milk House by Yumiko Kawahara	Asari-chan by Mayumi Muroyama	
32	1986	Oishinbo by Tetsu Kariya and Akira Hanasaki	Silver Fang by Yoshihiro Takahashi	Purple Eyes in the Dark by Chie Shinohara	Ganbare, Kickers! by Noriaki Nagai	
33	1987	Hotel and Manga Nihon Keizai Nyumon by Shotaro Ishinomori	Just Meet and Fuyu Monogatari by Hidenori Hara	Boyfriend by Fuyumi Soryo	Tsurupika Hagemaru by Shinbo Nomura	
34	1988	Genji Monogatari by Miyako Maki	B.B. by Osamu Ishiwata	Fancy Dance by Reiko Okano	Obocchama-kun by Yoshinori Kobayashi	
35	1989	Yawara! by Naoki Urasawa	Ucchare Goshogawara by Tsuyoshi Nakaima	Papa Told Me by Nanae Haruno	Lovely Mari-chan by Kimiko Uehara	
36	1990	F by Noboru Rokuda	Mobile Police Patlabor by Masami Yūki	Crest of the Royal Family by Chieko Hosokawa; Hajime-chan ga Ichiban! by Taeko Watanabe (tie)	Amaizo! Dango by Moo. Nenpei	
37	1991	Kazoku no Shokutaku and Asunaro Hakusho by Fumi Saimon	Ushio & Tora by Kazuhiro Fujita	Makoto Call! by Kazuko Fujita	Dojji Danpei by Tetsuhiro Koshita	
38	1992	Okami-san by Ichimaru; Miyamoto kara Kimi e by Hideki Arai (tie)	Ghost Sweeper Mikami by Takashi Shiina; Yaiba: Samurai Legend by Gosho Aoyama (tie)	Basara by Yumi Tamura	No award given	
39	1993	Kaze no Daichi by Nobuhiro Sakata and Eiji Kazama	YuYu Hakusho by Yoshihiro Togashi	Bara no Tame ni by Akemi Yoshimura	One More Jump by Michiyo Akaishi	
40	1994	Bokkō by Hideki Mori	Slam Dunk by Takehiko Inoue	Baby and Me by Marimo Ragawa	Ore wa Otoko Da! Kunio-kun by Kōsaku Anakubo	
41	1995	Ron by Motoka Murakami; Gallery Fake and Tarō by Fujihiko Hosono (tie)	Major by Takuya Mitsuda	Boys Over Flowers by Yoko Kamio	Kocchi Muite! Miiko by Eriko Ono	
42	1996	Gekka no Kishi by Junichi Nōjō	Firefighter! Daigo of Fire Company M by Masahito Soda	Kanon by Chiho Saito	Midori no Makibaō by Tsunomaru	
43	1997	Azumi by Yū Koyama	Ganba! Fly High by Shinji Morisue and Hiroyuki Kikuta	Ceres, Celestial Legend by Yuu Watase	Ninpen Manmaru by Mikio Igarashi	
44	1998	Aji Ichi Monme by Zenta Abe and Yoshimi Kurata	Project ARMS by Kyoichi Nanatsuki and Ryōji Minagawa	Angel Lip by Kiyoko Arai	No award given	
45	1999	No award given	Monkey Turn by Katsutoshi Kawai; Hikaru no Go by Yumi Hotta and Takeshi Obata (tie)	Bara-Iro no Ashita by Ryo Ikuemi	Taro the Space Alien by Yasunari Nagatoshi	
46	2000	Monster by Naoki Urasawa	Case Closed by Gosho Aoyama; Cheeky Angel by Hiroyuki Nishimori (tie)	Red River by Chie Shinohara	Seikimatsu Leader den Takeshi! by Mitsutoshi Shimabukuro	
47	2001	Heat by Buronson and Ryoichi Ikegami	Inuyasha by Rumiko Takahashi	Kaguyahime by Reiko Shimizu; Yasha by Akimi Yoshida (tie)	Pukupuku Natural Circular Notice by Sayuri Tatsuyama	
48	2002	20th Century Boys by Naoki Urasawa	Zatch Bell! by Makoto Raiku	Nana by Ai Yazawa; Kaze Hikaru by Taeko Watanabe (tie)	Croket! by Manavu Kashimoto	
49	2003	Dr. Kotō Shinryōjo by Takatoshi Yamada	Yakitate!! Japan by Takashi Hashiguchi; Fullmetal Alchemist by Hiromu Arakawa (tie)	Love★Com by Aya Nakahara	Mirmo! by Hiromu Shinozuka	
50	2004	Team Medical Dragon by Tarō Nogizaka and Akira Nagai	Bleach by Tite Kubo	Sand Chronicles by Hinako Ashihara; We Were There by Yūki Obata (tie)	Sgt. Frog by Mine Yoshizaki; Grandpa Danger by Kazutoshi Soyama (tie)	
51	2005	A Spirit of the Sun by Kaiji Kawaguchi; Rainbow - Nisha Rokubō no Shichinin by George Abe and Masasumi Kakizaki (tie)	Wild Life by Masato Fujisaki	Sonnanja neyo by Kaneyoshi Izumi	Animal Alley by Ryō Maekawa	
52	2006	Bengoshi no Kuzu by Hideo Iura	Kekkaishi by Yellow Tanabe	7 Seeds by Yumi Tamura	Kirarin Revolution by An Nakahara	
53	2007	Bambino! by Tetsuji Sekiya; Kurosagi by Takeshi Natsuhara and Kuromaru (tie)	Ace of Diamond by Yuji Terajima	Boku no Hatsukoi o Kimi ni Sasagu by Kotomi Aoki	Keshikasu-kun by Noriyuki Murase	
54	2008	Gaku: Minna no Yama by Shinichi Ishizuka	Cross Game by Mitsuru Adachi	Black Bird by Kanoko Sakurakoji	Naisho no Tsubomi by Yuu Yabuuchi	
55	2009	Shin'ya Shokudō by Yarō Abe	Sket Dance by Kenta Shinohara	Machi de Uwasa no Tengu no Ko by Nao Iwamoto	A Penguin's Troubles by Yūji Nagai	
56	2010	Ushijima the Loan Shark by Shohei Manabe; Space Brothers by Chūya Koyama	King Golf by Ken Sasaki and Masaki Tani	Ōoku by Fumi Yoshinaga	Yumeiro Patissiere by Natsumi Matsumoto	
57	2011	Kids on the Slope by Yūki Kodama	Nobunaga Concerto by Ayumi Ishii	Pin to Kona by Ako Shimaki	Inazuma Eleven by Ten'ya Yabuno	
58	2012	I Am a Hero by Kengo Hanazawa	Silver Spoon by Hiromu Arakawa	Piece by Hinako Ashihara	Mysterious Joker by Hideyasu Takahashi	
59	2013	Mogura no Uta by Noboru Takahashi	Magi: The Labyrinth of Magic by Shinobu Ohtaka	Kanojo wa Uso o Aishisugiteru by Kotomi Aoki	Zekkyō Gakkyū by Emi Ishikawa	
60	2014	Asahinagu by Ai Kozaki; Aoi Honō by Kazuhiko Shimamoto (tie)	Be Blues! by Motoyuki Tanaka	Joō no Hana by Kaneyoshi Izumi	Yo-kai Watch by Noriyuki Konishi	
61	2015	Umimachi Diary by Akimi Yoshida; Sunny by Taiyo Matsumoto	Haikyū!! by Haruichi Furudate	My Love Story!! by Kazune Kawahara and Aruko	Usotsuki! Gokuō-kun by Makoto Yoshimoto	
62	2016	Blue Giant by Shinichi Ishizuka; Jūhan Shuttai! by Naoko Matsuda (tie)	Mob Psycho 100 by ONE	37.5°C no Namida by Chika Shiina	Ijime by Kaoru Igarashi	
63	2017	Kūbo Ibuki by Kaiji Kawaguchi; After the Rain by Jun Mayuzuki (tie)	The Promised Neverland by Kaiu Shirai and Posuka Demizu	Love Me, Love Me Not by Io Sakisaka	PriPri Chi-chan!! by Hiromu Shinozuka	
64	2018	Hibiki: Shōsetsuka ni Naru Hōhō by Mitsuharu Yanamoto; Kenkō de Bunkateki na Saitei Gendo no Seikatsu by Haruko Kashiwagi	Dr. Stone by Riichiro Inagaki and Boichi	Suteki na Kareshi by Kazune Kawahara	Age 12 by Nao Maita	
65	2019	Aoashi by Yūgo Kobayashi and Naohiko Ueno; Kaguya-sama: Love is War by Aka Akasaka (tie)	Kiyo in Kyoto by Aiko Koyama	Nagi no Oitoma by Misato Konari	My New Life as a Cat by Konomi Wagata	
66	2020	Dead Dead Demon's Dededede Destruction by Inio Asano; Police in a Pod by Miko Yasu (tie)	Teasing Master Takagi-san by Sōichirō Yamamoto; Chainsaw Man by Tatsuki Fujimoto (tie)	Yuzuki-san Chi no Yon Kyōdai by Shizuki Fujisawa	Duel Masters by Shigenobu Matsumoto; The Magic of Chocolate by Rino Mizuho (tie)	
67	2021	Nigatsu no Shōsha by Shiho Takase; Don't Call It Mystery by Yumi Tamura (tie)	Komi Can't Communicate by Tomohito Oda	My Love Mix-Up! by Wataru Hinekure and Aruko	No award given	
68	2022	Medalist by Tsurumaikada	Call of the Night by Kotoyama; Ao no Orchestra by Makoto Akui (tie)	Ashita, Watashi wa Dareka no Kanojo by Hinao Wono	Ui × Kon by Minori Kurosaki	

=== 2023–present ===
#	Year	Recipients	Ref.
69	2023	The Elusive Samurai by Yusei Matsui; Frieren: Beyond Journey's End by Kanehito Yamada and Tsukasa Abe; Sūji de Asobo by Murako Kinuta; Trillion Game by Riichiro Inagaki and Ryoichi Ikegami	
70	2024	Burning Kabaddi by Hajime Musashino; Draw This, Then Die! by Minoru Toyoda; Natsume Arata no Kekkon by Tarō Nogizaka; Puniru Is a Cute Slime by Maedakun	
71	2025	Cosmos by Ryuhei Tamura; Fate Rewinder by Fūta Kimura; Dandadan by Yukinobu Tatsu; Dekin no Mogura by Natsumi Eguchi; Hirayasumi by Keigo Shinzō	

== See also ==
- List of manga awards
