= Betsucomi =

Japanese manga magazine

- Cover of the December 2007 issue of Betsucomi
- Categories: Shōjo manga
- Frequency: Monthly
- Circulation: 8,000; (July–September 2026)
- Founded: April 1970
- Company: Shogakukan
- Country: Japan
- Based in: Tokyo
- Language: Japanese
- Website: betsucomi.shogakukan.co.jp

Betsucomi (Japanese: ベツコミ, Hepburn: Betsukomi), known as Bessatsu Shōjo Comic (別冊少女コミック, Bessatsu Shōjo Komikku) before 2000, is a monthly Japanese shōjo manga magazine published by Shogakukan. It was conceived as a bessatsu or "special issue" of its sister magazine Shōjo Comic. It is released on the 13th of each month.

== Serializations ==
=== Current ===
- Called Game (2017–present)
- Yuzuki-san Chi no Yon Kyōdai (2018–present)
- Diary of a Female Lead: Shujinkou Nikki (2021–present)
- Yaoyoruzu Toriatsukai Setsumeisho (2026–present)

=== Former ===
==== 1970–1979 ====
- Sunroom Nite (1970)
- Joker e... (1972)
- The Poe Clan (1972–1976)
- They Were Eleven (1975)
- California Story (1978–1981)

==== 1980–1989 ====
- Family! (1981–1985)
- Zenryaku Milk House (1983–1986)
- Kisshō Tennyo (1983–1984)
- Banana Fish (1985–1994)

==== 1990–1999 ====
- Basara (1990–1998)
- Kanojo ga Café ni iru (1992–1993)
- Tokyo Boys & Girls (1994–1996)
- Lovers' Kiss (1995–1996)
- Yasha (1996–2002) (Note: Transferred to Monthly Flowers in 2002.)
- Forbidden Dance (1997–1998)
- Kaze Hikaru (1997–2002)

==== 2000–2009 ====
- Doubt!! (2000–2002)
- Chicago (2000–2001)
- Hot Gimmick (2000–2005)
- 7 Seeds (2001–2002)
- We Were There (2002–2012)
- Sonnanja neyo (2002–2006)
- Sand Chronicles (2003–2006)
- Backstage Prince (2004–2005)
- Kamikaze Girls (2004)
- Romance of Darkness (2004–2005)
- Monkey High! (2005–2008) (Note: Initially serialized in Deracomi beginning in 2004; transferred to Betsucomi in 2005.)
- Black Bird (2006–2012)
- Seiho Boys' High School! (2006–2010)
- Beast Master (2006–2007)
- Dengeki Daisy (2007–2013)
- Joō no Hana (2007–2016)
- Piece (2008–2013)
- Kokoro Button (2009–2013)

==== 2010–2019 ====
- Ichirei Shite, Kiss (2012–2015)
- Hedgehog in Love (2013–2015)
- Hatsu*Haru (2014–2018)
- QQ Sweeper (2014–2015)
- Queen's Quality (2015–2025)
