= Aural Vampire discography =

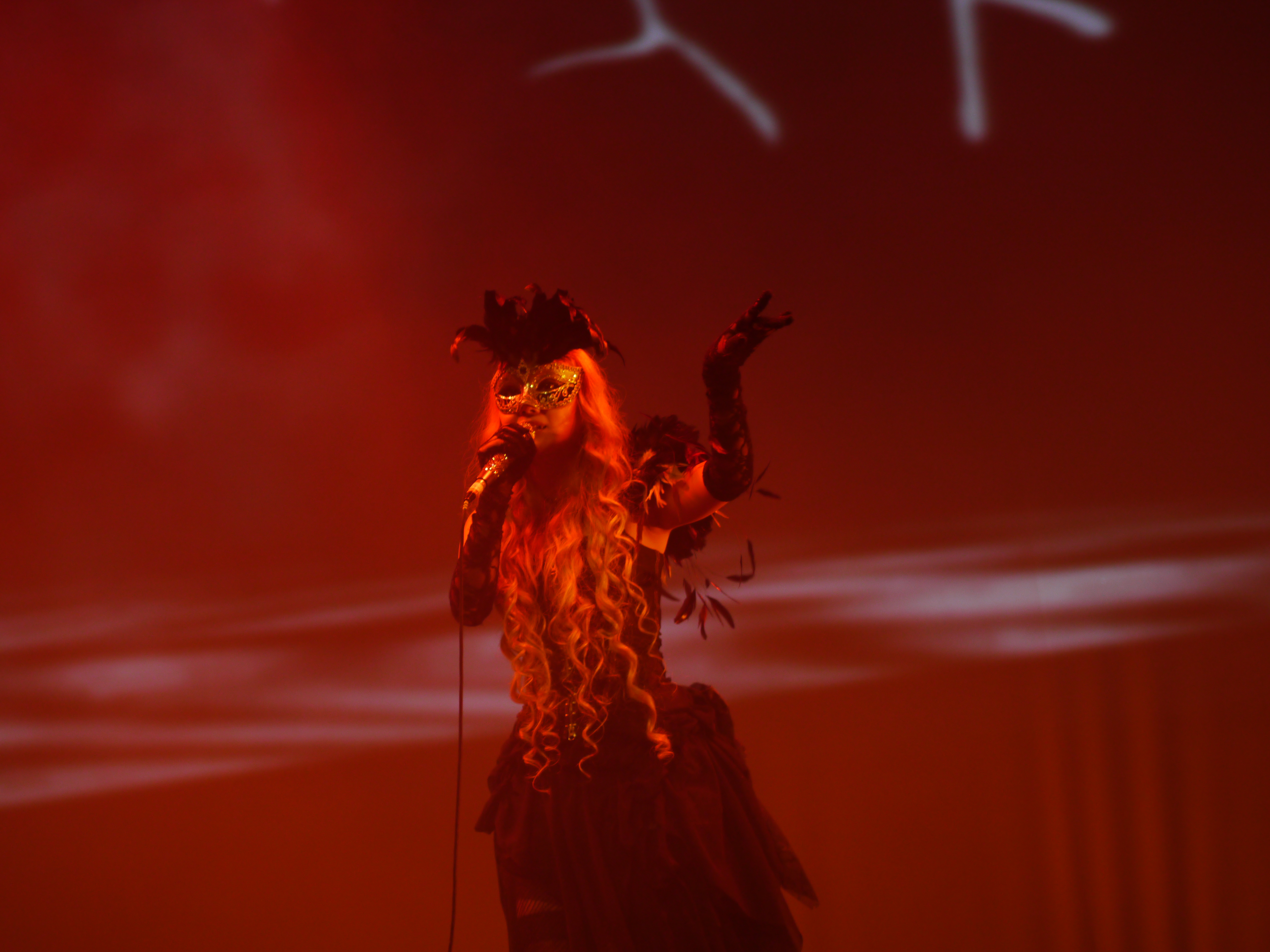
- Aural Vampire at Mang'Azur 2013
- Studio albums: 3
- Extended plays: 3
- Singles: 2
- Music videos: 3

This is the discography of Japanese darkwave duo Aural Vampire.

== Albums ==
=== Studio albums ===
#	Information
1st	Vampire Ecstasy: Release date: March 22, 2006
2nd	Zoltank: Release date: May 5, 2010
3rd	Razors on Backstreet: Release date: March 7, 2014

== Extended plays ==
#	Information
1st	Death Folder: Release date: 2005
2nd	Aural Vampire: Release date: October 28, 2008
3rd	Kerguelen Vortex: Release date: December 19, 2011
4th	Mimic Your Hairstyle: Release date: November 30, 2014

== Singles ==
Year	#	Single	Album
2009	1st	"Freeeeze!!"	Zoltank
2012	2nd	"Soloween"	Razors on Backstreet
2018	3rd	"Ninja vs Amazones"	-

== Music videos ==
Year	Video	Director
2004	"Freeeeze!!"	N/A
2010	"Shōnan-zoku -cannibal coast-"	N/A
2012	"Soloween"	N/A
2014	"Carpe Noctem"	N/A

== Other ==
=== Guest Contributions ===
- Blood - Blood (Featuring Exo-Chika)
- Mind:State - Close Your Eyes (Aural Vampire Mix)
- Boss on Parade - DJ TECHNORCH (Aural Vampire's Blast-O-Matic)
- Angelus - Gpkism (Aural Vampire Remix)

=== Miscellaneous Songs ===
- Yagi Parade [2004.11.29]
- Basara [2007.06.27]
- Nosaru (Let It Die OST) [2016.12.03]
