= GPK =

GPK may refer to:

- Kaaba Youth Movement (Gerakan Pemuda Kabah), youth wing of United Development Party
- East Glacier Park station, in Montana, United States
- Garbage Pail Kids, an animated television series and film
- Government Polytechnic, Karwar, in Karnataka, India
- Grange Park railway station, in London
- Grenzplankostenrechnung, a cost-accounting methodology
- GPK, Australian musician; founder of the band GPKism
