= RCA =

RCA may refer to:

== Radio Corporation of America ==
- RCA Corporation, a former American electronics company
- RCA (trademark), owned by Talisman Brands, Inc. since 2022
- RCA International Division, former international division of RCA

=== Music ===
- RCA Records
- RCA Camden
- RCA/Jive Label Group
- RCA Red Seal Records
- RCA Studio B, a recording studio in Nashville, Tennessee, USA
- RCA Victrola

== Sports ==
- Raed Club Arbaâ, an Algerian football club
- Racing Club Abidjan, an Ivorian football club
- Raja Club Athletic, a sports club in Casablanca, Morocco
- Rajasthan Cricket Association, Jaipur, India
- Rowing Canada Aviron, governing rowing
- Rwanda Cricket Association
- Racing Club Aruba, an Aruban football club

== Other organisations ==
- Rabbinical Council of America
- Radio Club Argentino
- Rail Cargo Austria, of Federal Railways
- Raleigh Christian Academy, North Carolina, US
- Reformed Church in America
- Revolutionary Communists of America
- Royal Cambrian Academy of Art, Conwy, Wales
- Royal Canadian Academy of Arts, Toronto, Ontario
- Royal College of Art, in London, England
- Royal Regiment of Canadian Artillery
- Revolutionary Commando Army

== Science and technology ==
- RCA clean, for silicon wafers
- RCA connector, an electrical connector
- rca space, in mathematical set algebra
- RCA Studio II, a video game console
- Right coronary artery
- Riot control agent, tear gas
- Ripple-carry adder, a digital circuit
- Rolling circle amplification of DNA
- Root cause analysis, a problem solving method
- RCA_{0}, a weak axiom system in reverse mathematics
- Recycled concrete aggregate, a type of construction aggregate

== Places ==
- RCA Dome, a football stadium in Indianapolis, US
- Royal City Avenue, Bangkok, Thailand

== Japan ==
- Ryoko Communications Association Co., Ltd. (RCA), later Japan Electronic Industries Development Association

== Other uses ==
- Resource consumption accounting, an accounting methodology
- Revealed comparative advantage, an index in international economics

== See also ==
- RCCA (disambiguation)
