= Alan Reinstein =

American accounting professor

- Born: United States
- Occupations: Consultant, accountant, professor

Academic background
- Education: State University of New York at New Paltz, University of Kentucky

Academic work
- Discipline: Accounting
- Sub-discipline: Accounting education, auditing and accounting research, and professional accounting practice
- Institutions: Wayne State University

Alan Reinstein is an American accountant and professor who is Professor Emeritus in the Department of Accounting at Wayne State University's Mike Ilitch School of Business in Detroit, Michigan. He is recognized for his work in accounting education, auditing and accounting research, professional accounting practice, and consulting.

== Early life and education ==
Reinstein earned degrees in mathematics, business, and accounting, including a B.A. and M.S. from the State University of New York at New Paltz, an M.B.A. from the University of Detroit, and a Doctor of Business Administration (D.B.A.) from the University of Kentucky.

== Career ==
Reinstein was an assistant professor at the University of Detroit from 1980-1982, associate professor of accounting at Oakland University from 1982-1987, and professor at Wayne State University from 1987-2024. He served as chair of its accounting department and became its George R. Husband Professor of Accounting. Today Reinstein works as a consultant for many accounting and economic issues for numerous attorneys, CPAs, and other professionals.

Reinstein served on the editorial boards of Advances in Accounting and Issues in Accounting Education and as associate editor of the Journal of Accounting Education. He was Vice President of Education of the American Accounting Association. He also served on the boards of the Michigan Association of CPAs (MICPA) and the Detroit chapters of the Institute of Management Accountants, Institute of Internal Auditors, and Financial Executives Institute. Reinstein also authored hundreds of articles throughout his career.

== Recognition ==
Reinstein in 2008, became the first recipient of the University of Kentucky's Von Allmen School of Accountancy Ph.D. Alumnus Award. In 2011, he earned the annual MICPA Distinguished Service Award. The CPA Journal Awarded him its Max Block Awards for the best articles published in 2008 and 2010, and the American Institute of Certified Public Accountants (AICPA) awarded him its John L. Lawler Award for the best article published in the Journal of Accountancy in 2009.

== Selected publications ==
- Reckers, P.M., Iyers, G.S. and Reinstein, A. (2025) "Impaired Financial Reporting Through Rationalizations: Narcissism as a Moderator of the Ethical Effects of Construal Mindset and Moral Disengagement". Journal of Accountancy, Auditing and Finance, p. 0148558X251411596
- Kaszak, S.E., Reckers, P.M. and Reinstein, A., (2025) “The Impact of Antagonistic Narcissism on Auditor Skepticism with Moderation by Client Financial and ESG Performance”. Journal of Business Ethics, 202(3), pp. 567–586.
- Kaszak, S.E., Johnson, E.N., Reckers, P.M. and Reinstein, A. (2025) "Narcissism Dynamics and Auditor Skepticism". Journal of Business Ethics,197(1), pp. 99–116.
- Pevzner, M., Reinstein, A., Wynter, M. and Yao, T., (2025) "The Impact of Capping the SALT deduction on municipal bond pricing". Journal of Accounting and Public Policy, 51, p. 107312
- Reinstein, A. and Reckers, P. (2022) "The Effects of Exposing CPAs to Rationalizations: Conscious and Unconscious Outcomes". Accounting Horizons, 36(4), pp. 219–240.
- Reinstein, A., Pacini, C.J., and Green, B.P., (2020) "Examining the Current Legal Environment Facing the Public Accounting Profession: Recommendations for a Consistent US Policy". Journal of Accounting, Auditing, and Finance, 35(1), pp. 3–25.
- Fogarty, T.J., Reinstein, A., and Heath R. (2017). "Are Today's Young Accountants Different? An Inter-Generational-Comparison of Three Psychological Attributes". Accounting Horizons, 31(2), pp. 83–104.
- Reinstein, A. and Taylor, E.Z., (2017) "Fences as Controls to Reduce Accountants' Rationalization". Journal of Business Ethics, 141(3), pp. 477–488.
- Reinstein, A., Green, B.P. and Beaulieu, P., (2013) “How Certain Engagement Letter Clauses Affect the Auditor’s Assessment of Perceived Engagement Risk for Nonissuers”. Journal of Accounting, Auditing, and Finance, 28(4), pp. 397–420.
- Bayou, M.E., Reinstein, A. and Williams, P.F., (2011) “To Tell the Truth: A Discussion of Issues Concerning Truth and Ethics in Accounting". Accounting, Organizations and Society, 36(2), pp. 109–124.
- Beaulieu, P. and Reinstein, A., (2010) “Belief Perseverance among Accounting Practitioners Regarding the Effect of Non-Audit Services on Auditor Independence”. Journal of Accounting and Public Policy, 29(4), pp. 353–373.
- Reinstein, A., Green, B.P. and Miller, C.L., (2006) “Evidence of Perceived Quality of ‘Plain‐Paper Statements’”. Auditing: A Journal of Practice and Theory, 25(2), pp.85-94.
- Siegel, P.H., Reinstein, A. and Miller, C.L., (2001) “Mentoring and Organizational Justice among Audit Professionals”. Journal of Accounting, Auditing, and Finance, 16(1), pp. 1–25.
