= Abaddon (Italian band) =

Italian black metal band

- Origin: Italy/USA
- Genres: black metal, death metal, blackened death metal
- Years active: 1999–present
- Members: Nullifer Bones; Candy Bones; Zack Undead
- Website: abaddon.it

Abaddon is an Italian extreme metal band from Emilia-Romagna, formed in 1999. It is heavily associated with sister band Spectrum-X.

== History ==
=== Early history and first album (1999-2003) ===
Abaddon was formed in Chicago in 1999, initially as a solo project of Nullifer Bones with accompanying live musicians. Their first musical creation to be released was an untitled demo released in 1999 on Nullifer Bones's birthday, August 2. Later that year, the first full-length EP, Entitled Master, was released in limited print cassette tape form on September 9. During this period the band toured throughout Illinois & Wisconsin including The Rave / Eagles Club.

=== Joining of Candy Bones (2004-2009) ===
In 2004 founder Nullifer Bones moved to Italy where he created the project Spectrum-X with his future wife, musician Candy Bones. A few tracks created for the Master EP from 1999 were performed live and some were used on a Spectrum-X demo, Dreambook, which was released in 2004. In 2006 Candy Bones joined the project as bassist. During this period they created mostly atmospherical black metal and classical music with a dark ambient feel. The musical tracks they created in these years ended up being used on the Spectrum-X albums "Tea Party with Zombies" and "Darkest Night Ever," which were released by the Japanese record label Darkest Labyrinth.

They were featured in many different magazines including the Gothic Bible to advertise the Japanese Goth subculture accessories company Suppurate System, Kera magazine for heavy metal subculture clothing, German gothic magazine Dark Spy, and Alamode magazine for the Darkest Labyrinth compilation album and festival. In 2008 they toured in Osaka and Tokyo.

=== Recommencing exclusive activity (2010-2016) ===
In 2010 Abaddon returned to creating music exclusively for use under the name Abaddon. Later in the year, Zack Undead joined the project as second guitarist. On September 12, 2012, they released "The Bringer of Light" single in a limited print USB flash drive and t-shirt package.

=== Current activity leading up to upcoming album (2017-present) ===
In 2017 the band announced that they were nearing the release of an unnamed new album. In June, Abaddon released the first track from the upcoming album, a single entitled "Dominator" and an official music video for the track. On August 10, Abaddon released the 2nd track for the same album, a single entitled "Mark Ov Emptiness" together with another official music video.

== Members ==
=== Current members ===
- Nullifer Bones – guitar, vocals (1999–present)
- Candy Bones – bass (2006–present)
- Zack Undead – guitar (2010–present)

=== Current live musicians ===
- Francesco Migliorini – drums (2017–present)

== Discography ==
| Year | Album | Album type |
|---|---|---|
| 1999 | Untitled | Demo |
| 2012 | The bringer of light | Single |
| 2017 | Dominator | Single |
| 2017 | Mark Ov Emptiness | Single |
| 2004 | Spectrum-X Dreambook | Associated Album |
| 2006 | Spectrum-X Tea Party With Zombies | Associated Album |
| 2008 | Spectrum-X Tea Party With Zombies (2008) | Associated Album |
| 2008 | Spectrum-X Darkest Night Ever (2008) | Associated Album |
| 2017 | Master (1999) | Studio album |
| 2017 | (no name given yet and unreleased) (2017) | Studio album |
