= Blood (band) =

Japanese metal band

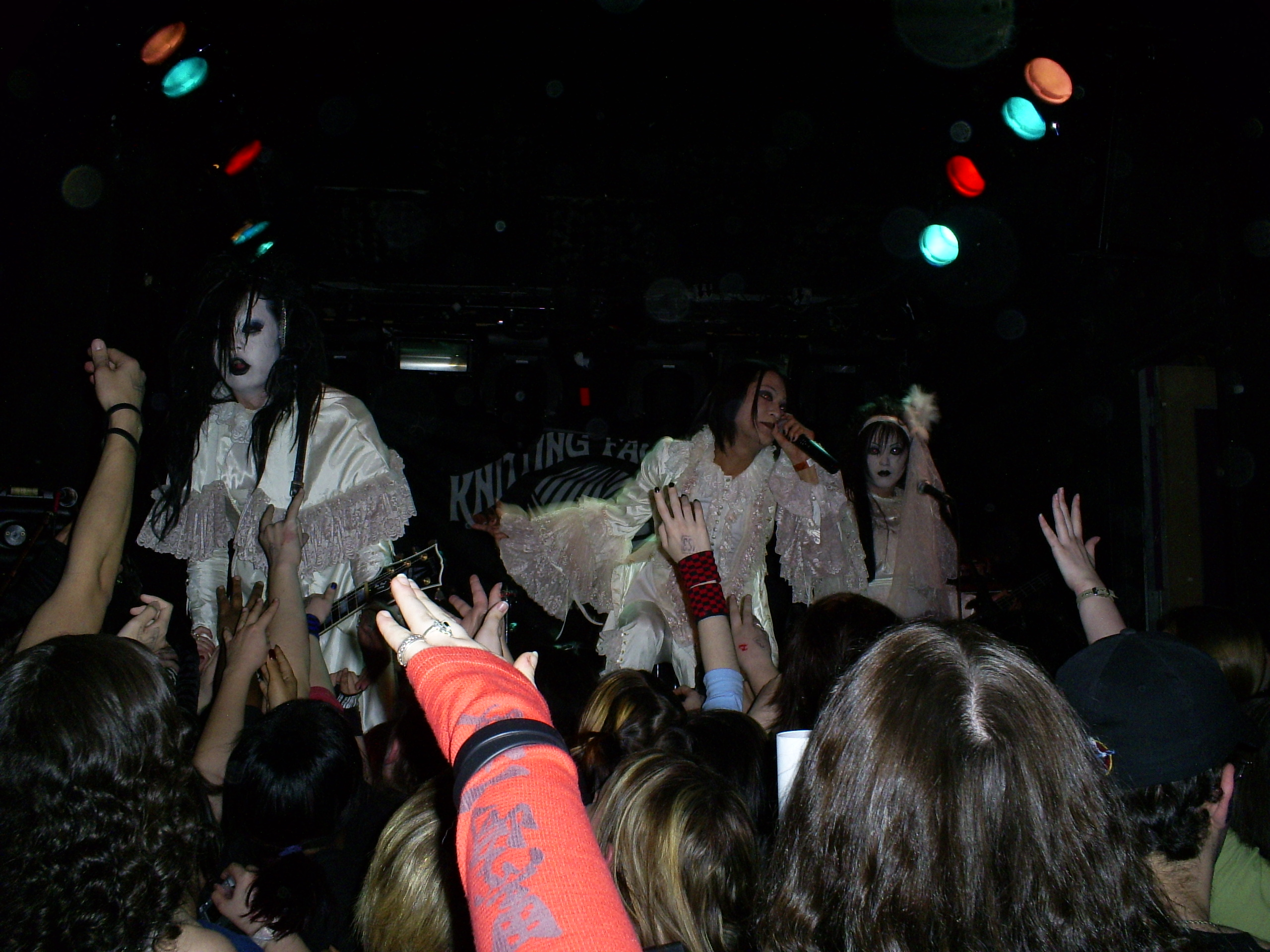
- BLOOD live in New York City.

Background information
- Origin: Osaka, Japan
- Genres: Industrial metal, gothic metal
- Years active: 2002–2009, 2011–present
- Label: Starwave Records
- Members: Kiwamu; Kazuha; Azami; Dora
- Past members: Kaede; Fu-ki; Ryo; Taichi; Takeshi; Dai; Hayato

Blood (often stylized as ̶B̶L̶O̶O̶D̶) is a Japanese band that was active from 2002 to 2009, returning in 2011. Blood's aim is to create music that expresses the meaning of human emotion that breaks the musical frame. They are closely associated with visual kei, but the band refers to themselves as a "gothic band".

They have toured in Japan, Europe, the United States, Mexico and Australia. They're one of the first Japanese visual kei bands to tour in Australia. Blood was regularly featured in the Gothic & Lolita Bible and they have been featured in western magazines, including Astan, Rumore, and Gothic Beauty.

== History ==
Blood was formed in February 2002 in Osaka, and has separate "periods" defined by changing concepts. The band was formed when members Kiwamu and Kaede recruited Dai and Taichi to their duo project. During the first period they released three singles, "Bloodtype", "Morphine/Collector", and "Tsuioku: I Remember You".

On February 10, 2003, the vocalist Dai left. Blood began their second period with new vocalist Takeshi and released the mini-album "Blood". Blood performed twice in the USA at Fanime in 2003 and Anime Expo during the same year. They also released their third and fourth demo tapes. On February 29, 2004, Taichi and Takeshi left the band. Blood performed again at Fanime in May with their new vocalist Fu-ki. This was his first time performing with the band in America.

With new vocalist Fu-ki's entry into the band, Blood began to move their music in a more hard rock direction. The third period had a vampire concept. Their next series of albums would follow a vampire story much in the vein of Anne Rice's novels, with the story penned entirely by Fu-ki and music writing handled solely by Kiwamu.

In the winter of 2004, they released "Vengeance for Blood" and began their worldwide tour, starting in Europe. Soon after, Blood was interviewed on the radio show Bad Transitions on 91.7 WIXQ FM, a college radio station based in Millersville, Pennsylvania. The show was also broadcast by internet webcast.

During a tour in May 2005, played three shows in Mexico City. That summer (July 2005), they released "Vengeance for Blood 2" and another European and Mexican tour followed. During the Mexican tour, they filmed their first full-length live DVD "Vengeance for Blood - Live in Mexico". Early in 2006, they released the final chapter in their vampire concept, "Vengeance for Blood 3". 2,000 copies were pressed, and it sold out in four days.

In November 2006, they did another interview on WIXQ FM, this time on the newly formed Tainted Reality, hosted by former Bad Transitions host Roger Shackelford. The following month (March 2006), they did their last tour with the vampire concept though Europe and a special live event in Japan.

Shortly after, they announced a US and Mexico tour (Les Fleurs Du Mal). The USA tour sold out at both stops in Los Angeles and New York City.

With the vampire concept finished, Blood was faced with a new beginning. They continued in the hard rock direction and started a new concept based on the poetry of French poet, Charles Baudelaire.

They released their first mini-album under the French poetry concept entitled "Spleen ~Despair~" on October 7, 2006. Another tour of Europe followed, as well as an announcement of a US mini-tour for March 2007. "Les Fleurs du Mal" was released on July 7, 2007 in both Regular and Limited Edition, The Limited including the Darkest Labyrinth Vol.1 tour documentary. In this period, Kiwamu opened Cure distribution (Now known as Darkest Labyrinth) which aims to distribute foreign CD's in Japan, with GPKISM, Spectrum-x, Virgins O.R Pigeons and Noir du'Soleil being some of the artists currently signed.

Almost a month after the release of "Les Fleurs du Mal" Blood released "Best Collection 2002-2007", composed of 4 songs from the first 2 eras of the band and the 12 from the present period. Afterward, the band worked on "Symphony of Chaos", which had a gothic industrial sound. EP "Dead-Hearted" was released September 9, 2007 and is the first of their works in the Symphony of Chaos concept, the track 'Blood' being a cover of a previous era and also includes Exo-Chika of Aural Vampire as a guest vocalist. Their single "Chain" was then released in December 2007 and "Vengeance for Blood" re-released.

In early 2008 the band activities were relatively silent.

Breaking the silence, the band released "The Reaper Behind Me", the first full-length album from the new concept. The CD contained two discs in which the second contained 10 remixes of songs from and prior to the album. Following the album's release the band toured Australia with GPKISM and Aural Window.

In September 2007, Kiwamu joined GPKISM headed by GPK (Gothique Prince Ken) of Australia as the guitarist. The band recruited Ryonai (Blam Honey) on live keyboards and have released 1 album and 1 single, gaining them some notoriety. It was announced on November 20, 2008 through their official MySpace page that Blood will cease activities after their 2009 album Lost Sky and their final tour, entitled "La Fin de la Journee".

Kaede and Ryo did not participate in the final tour. Gothique Prince Ken (better known as GPK) filled in on keyboard.

Blood officially returned in 2011 with new members Hayato (vocalist), Kazuha (guitar), Dora (drums), and Azami (bass, of Misaruka), releasing the singles "Bathory" in June and Elizabeth in October. The band performed a North American tour in November, stopping at Dotcon in Toronto, Boston, NYC, Pennsylvania, and at Anime USA with the main act Matenrou Opera.

8 June 2012 Hayato left the band. In an interview he stated he could not disclose the reason.

== Members ==
- Kazuha - guitar
- Kiwamu - guitar, programming
- Azami - bass
- Dora - drums

Past members

- Vocals - Fu~ki, until 2009
- Bass - Kaede, until 2009
- Programming - Ryo, until 2009
- Vocals - Takeshi, until 2004
- Guitar - Taichi, until 2004
- Vocals - DAI, until 2003
- Vocals - Hayato, 2011-2012

Guest members

- Yuu – guitar (of Suicide Ali)
- Juya – guitar (of D'Air)
- Noa – guitar (of Brand 0)
- Emily Rose – vocals (of Hallows End)
- Exo-Chika – vocals (of Aural Vampire)

== Discography ==
Albums

- 1st Period (1 April 2004)
- 1st Period DX (23 July 2005)
- 2nd Period DX (23 July 2005)
- Vengeance for Blood DX Limited Edition (1 July 2006)
- Les Fleurs Du Mal (7 July 2007)
- Vengeance for Blood Integral Edition (26 March 2008)
- The Reaper Behind Me (7 May 2008)
- Lost Sky (28 Jan 2009)

EPs

- Blood (7 February 2004)
- Vengeance for Blood (17 December 2004)
- Vengeance for Blood 2 (9 July 2005)
- Vengeance for Blood 3 (14 February 2006)
- Spleen -Despair- (7 October 2006)
- Dead-Hearted (15 September 2007)

Singles

- "Bloodtype" (8 August 2002)
- "Morphine/Collector" (15 November 2002)
- "Tsuioku -I Remember You-" (追憶～I Remember You～, 30 January 2003)
- "Blind" (6 August 2004)
- "The Funeral for Humanity" (10 September 2004)
- "Brumes Et Pluies -Mist and Rain-" (14 February 2007)
- "Chain" (12 December 2007)
- "Bathory" (15 June 2011)
- "Elizabeth" (26 October 2011)
- Unseen The New World (2012)

Demos

- "Morphine" (14 February 2002)
- "Tsuioku" (追憶; 14 March 2002)
- "Kuroki Chi no Zensoukyouku" (黒き血の前奏曲; 3 May 2005)
- "Hyakuoku no Hikari to Senoku no Kage" (百億の光と千億の影; 1 July 2003)

Compilations

- Darkest Labyrinth (with "Fountain of Blood", 17 March 2007)

Video

- Blood Films #01 (music videos, 15 March 2003)
- Live in USA -Infected with Blood- (live performance, 20 October 2003)
- Vengeance for Blood Live in Mexico (live performance, 23 March 2006)
