= Vampire Ecstasy =

Vampire Ecstasy may refer to

- the 1974 film The Devil's Plaything
- an Aural Vampire album
