= RCA Communication Systems =

RCA Communications Systems
- Product type: Two-way radio
- Current owner: Discount Two Way Radio Corporation
- Country: United States
- Markets: United States, Canada
- Website: www.rcacommunicationssystems.com

RCA Communications Systems (or RCA Communication Systems) is a private label brand used by Discount Two Way Radio Corporation (DTWR) to market its two-way radios and related communications equipment. The RCA logo is used under licence from Technicolor SA.

== History ==
In 2009, an agreement was made between Discount Two Way Radio Corporation (DTWR) and Technicolor SA to manufacture two-way radio products under the RCA brand.

RCA Communications Systems was the official sponsor of the United States Bobsled and Skeleton Team for the 2022 Winter Olympic Games in Beijing.

== Markets ==
There are more than 100 authorized resellers of RCA two-way radios in the US. In Canada, Allcan Distributors is the exclusive distributor.

== Products ==
The range of RCA two-way radios consists of both analog and digital models. The RCA PRODIGI™ is the digital line of two-way radios. The RDR26x0 models are assembled in the United States.

=== Two-way radio models ===
| Model | Type | Digital or Analog | Feature | Band | Connector | Status |
|---|---|---|---|---|---|---|
| BR200 | Portable | Analog | No Screen / Keypad | UHF or VHF | 2-Pin | Current |
| BR250 | Portable | Analog | No Screen / Keypad | UHF or VHF | 2-Pin (Screw) | Canceled |
| RDR1520 | Portable | Digital & Analog | No Screen / Keypad | UHF or VHF | 2-Pin (Screw) | Current |
| RDR2320 | Portable | Digital & Analog | No Screen / Keypad | UHF or VHF | 2-Pin (Screw) | Current |
| RDR2325 | Portable | Digital & Analog | No Screen / Keypad | UHF or VHF | 2-Pin (Screw) | Canceled |
| RDR2380 | Portable | Digital & Analog | Full Screen / Full Keypad | UHF or VHF | 2-Pin (Screw) | Current |
| RDR2385 | Portable | Digital & Analog | Full Screen / Full Keypad | UHF or VHF | 2-Pin (Screw) | Canceled |
| RDR2500 | Portable | Digital & Analog | No Screen / Keypad | UHF or VHF | 2-Pin (Screw) | Current |
| RDR2550 | Portable | Digital & Analog | Full Screen / Limited Keypad | UHF or VHF | 2-Pin (Screw) | Current |
| RDR2620 | Portable | Digital & Analog | No Screen / Keypad | UHF or VHF | 2-Pin (Screw) | Current |
| RDR2650 | Portable | Digital & Analog | Full Screen / Limited Keypad | UHF or VHF | 2-Pin (Screw) | Current |
| RDR2680 | Portable | Digital & Analog | Full Screen / Full Keypad | UHF or VHF | 2-Pin (Screw) | Current |
| RDR4320 | Portable | Digital & Analog | No Screen / Keypad | UHF or VHF | - | Canceled |
| RDR4350 | Portable | Digital & Analog | Full Screen / Limited Keypad | UHF or VHF | - | Canceled |
| RDR4380 | Portable | Digital & Analog | Full Screen / Full Keypad | UHF or VHF | - | Canceled |
| RDR4220 | Portable | Digital & Analog | No Screen / Keypad | UHF or VHF | XPR7 Multipin | Current |
| RDR4250 | Portable | Digital & Analog | Full Screen / Limited Keypad | UHF or VHF | XPR7 Multipin | Current |
| RDR4280 | Portable | Digital & Analog | Full Screen / Full Keypad | UHF or VHF | XPR7 Multipin | Current |
