= UVA method =

The UVA method (fr. Méthode des Unités de Valeur Ajoutée—the Value-added Unit Method) is an accounting and decision-making tool, based on calculating the cost of sales. Unlike management accounting, which calculates product margins, the UVA method calculates the result (profit or loss) generated by each sale. The UVA method relies on a very detailed analysis of all costs related to products, customers, orders, and deliveries. It introduces the notion of a single measure unit (the UVA), which applies to all the operations in the company. The method relies on an equivalent-based approach.

== Origins of the UVA Method ==
The UVA method is an upgrade of the GP method., which traces back to the works of Georges Perrin (1891–1958), a French engineer and a graduate of the Ecole Centrale. In 1953, he presented his product costing method, based on the introduction of a measure unit —the GP—which was distinct from currency, and which allowed one to express the entire production of a company. The GP unit stands for the effort that the company needs to make in order to produce a representative good (a basic item). The validity of the method relies on the principle of the occult constants, postulated by Georges Perrin, according to which the relationships between the production efforts made to produce various goods remain stable over time.

Jean Fiévez and Robert Zaya from the Les Ingénieurs Associés (LIA) consulting office, took it to the next level. In 1995, its name changed into the Value-added Unit Method (UVA). As against the GP method, which focused only on product costing, the UVA method looks into most about every operation in the company.

== Basic Concepts of the UVA Method ==
The UVA method relies on a highly detailed analysis of all value-producing processes, which involves both product-related processes and customer-related ones.

The whole added-value production of a business is measured with the help of one unit: the UVA. The idea of using a measure unit that would be shared by all the company's operations is based on the fact that only companies that make a single product know its cost perfectly (namely, the result of total expenses divided by the number of units produced). The introduction of the UVA changes every company into a "mono-product" one

By analysing all of its processes, the company can envisage "determining its results per sale". This is the main objective of the UVA method, since a transaction/sale (which translates into an invoice) concentrates all the efforts carried out through the company's various operations. This is clearly a new approach to management, in which one asks oneself whether a transaction between the company and its customer results in profit or loss. The customer is therefore at the centre of the decision-making mechanism. When the customer buys something for a given sum, has the company earned or lost money? Each sale contributes to the overall result of the company. The result of a sale is the difference between the cashed amount and the cost of the sale. The aggregated results of all sales constitute the company's EBIT (earnings before interest and taxes).

The question of precision in costing is linked to the presence of indirect costs. By placing the sale at the centre of the analysis, the UVA method does away with direct/indirect costs, because from a sale viewpoint, all costs are direct: sold products, transport, order processing, invoicing, etc. Thanks to that approach, the UVA method provides a high result precision.

The method presents two cost axes: product costs and customer costs. Product costs include design, processing, raw materials, production, control, storage, post-sale service, etc. Everything that the company has had to do to sell its products (or services) falls under the customer costs. Customer costs include market research, order processing, order preparation, shipment, invoicing, etc.

About 90 to 95 percent of resources fall under two categories of costs: products and customers. The rest of the costs have to do with the internal operation of the business: general management, financial accounting, etc.

Product costs have two distinct components: the cost of the value added by the company and the cost of integrated purchases. Integrated purchases (essentially, the raw materials required to produce a good) are called Product-specific Expenses (PSE), according to the UVA method. They can be found in the nomenclatures, so they are easy to calculate.

$Cost\ of\ a\ product = PSE + cost\ of\ the\ added\ value$

Customer costs, too, have two distinct components: the cost of the added value and the Customer-specific Expenses (CSE). The CSE may include the commission to the representative, the customer rebate, or the price paid to the carrier. These are costs that are determined directly.

$Customer\ cost = CSE + cost\ of\ the\ added\ value$

The UVA method focuses on a precise calculation of the added value.

All the added value that the business produces is measured by a single unit: the UVA.

== Main Notions ==
The UVA method introduces a certain number of specific notions :

=== Attributable expenses ===
They are expenses that can be attributed to the entries without any key of arbitrary allocation; they represent the use of resources by the entries.

The main attributable expenses are the following:

- Direct and indirect labour. This includes salaries, social contributions, cost of personnel service, and fringe benefits (accommodation, car, transportation tickets, etc.).
- Consumables. In an office, they generally include the telephone, the IT equipment, the office supplies, etc., and in a workshop: the electric power, the compressed air, the lubricants, etc.
- Maintenance (spare parts and labour);
- Depreciation—calculated on the basis of the replacement value of the equipment, its expected lifespan, and the annual number of operating hours;
- Area-related expenses include building depreciation or rent, maintenance and cleaning, heating, light, insurance, and others.

=== Cost of a Sale ===
The cost of a sale is the sum of product costs and customer costs incurred by the company in order to carry out the sale.

=== Index of a UVA Entry ===
The index of a UVA entry is the ratio between its rate and the basic rate.

$Index\ of\ a\ UVA\ entry={rate\ of\ the\ UVA\ entry \over base\ rate}$

In other words, the index of a UVA entry is given by its use of resources, expressed in added value units.

=== Process ===
The process (or sequence of operations) is a succession of activities that are carried out in association with a UVA entry, within a given timeframe. The concept of UVA entry allows one to define every process that they identify in a business—without making a distinction between the manufacturing processes and any other process that generate added value (management, marketing, etc.), but rather viewing them as a sequence of operations carried out at the UVA entries during a given timeframe.

=== Profitability Curve ===
The profitability curve of the sales is a curve that represents the aggregated turnover (invoice by invoice) on its abscissa and the result rate (the result as a percentage of the turnover) on its ordinate. The invoices are classified in ascending order of the result rate.

The profitability curve shows a summarised structure of the result that the company has obtained during a given time period. It emphasises the heterogeneity of the transaction results obtained by the business. The company's global result may be positive, but the results of the sales that make it up will be highly variable. One distinguishes four categories of sales: highly-deficient sales—the so-called "hemorrhagic" ones (which have a result rate below –20 percent), deficient sales (going from –20 to 0 percent), profitable sales (0 to 20 percent), and the so-called dangerously profitable sales (of over 20 percent). The graph displays a sales profit curve in its canonical form. Turnover percentages may vary a lot from one category to another; on the other hand, result variation is common in all companies. In addition to the base curve that groups all sales together, one may plot out curves to represent a higher level of data aggregation. A sale that is represented by an invoice is in fact a "foundation brick" that enables one to form various types of groups. For instance, by grouping together all the invoices per customer, one obtains a customer profitability curve.

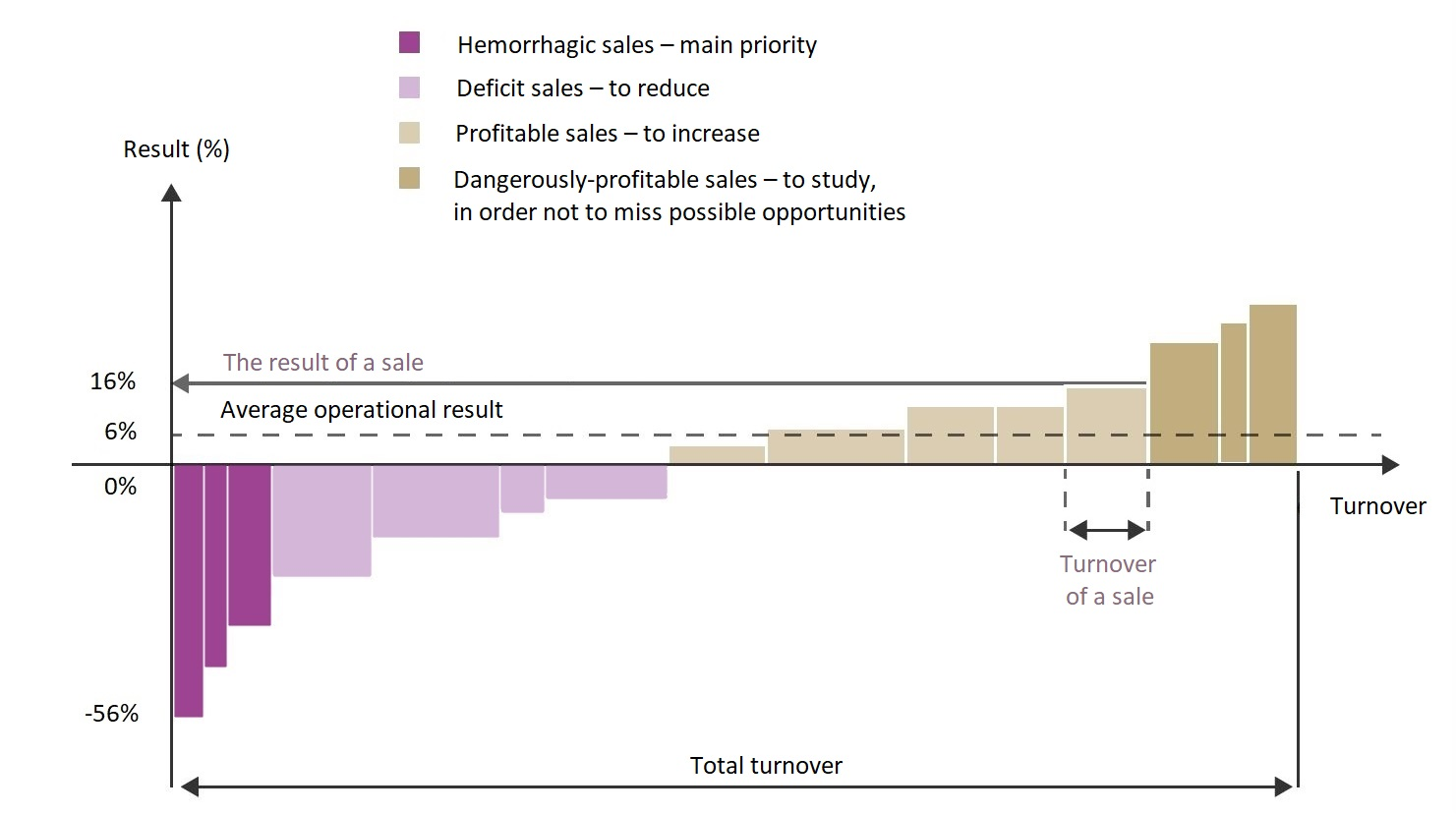

Profit curve in canonical form

=== Rate of UVA Entry ===
The rate of a UVA entry is the sum of the resources that have been used per unit of work. It includes labour, depreciation, floor space used, consumables, maintenance, etc. To calculate it, one must add up the unit expenses attributable to the entry.

=== Result of a sale ===
The result of a sale is the difference between the amount paid and the cost of the sale.

=== UVA – Added Value Unit ===
The added value unit (1 UVA) represents the use of resources required to carry out a typical process within the company's activity: generally speaking, it is the manufacturing of an item (in the case of a processing company) and execution of a service (in the case of a service company). The process is called basic process, and its rate will be the basic rate. By definition, the added-value unit corresponds to the amount of resources that have been used and which are required to carry out the basic process (producing a good or performing a service).

To calculate the current monetary cost of the unit, it is enough to divide the expenses that were incurred during a specific period of time by the number of UVAs produced during that period (UVAP). The product-specific expenses and customer-specific expenses (PSE and CSE) are deducted from the cost amount (C) provided by the general accounting, because these expenses are taken into account directly.

$Cost\ of\ the\ UVA=\frac{C -(PSE + CSE)}{UVAP}$

=== UVA Equivalent of a Process ===
The UVA equivalent of a process is given by its use of resources, expressed in added value units.

By multiplying the index of every UVA entry involved in a process execution by the usage time thereof, one obtains its use of resources (expressed in UVA) during that process. The sum of these uses constitutes the UVA equivalent of the process.

$UVA\ equivalent\ of\ a\ process=\sum_{i=1}^N entry\ index\ i\ \times \ usage\ time\ of\ the\ entry\ i$

=== UVA Entry ===
The UVA entry comprises all the material and human resources needed to carry out an operation, which are used in a clearly defined technical and economic framework. In other words, a UVA entry is by definition a homogeneous package of resource uses. UVA entries are present in every company operation.

To do a precise analysis of a company's operations, one needs to start by reviewing all of its work entries. The number of UVA entries depends on the size and structure of the analysed company and may range from a few dozen to several hundred.

== Implementation of the UVA Method ==
The implementation of the UVA method is composed of two phases : construction and exploitation

=== Construction ===
The construction of the UVA method comprises the following steps:

- inventory of UVA entries
- analysis of attributable expenses
- calculating the rate of the UVA entries
- choosing the UVA unit
- calculating the indices of the UVA entries
- describing the sequence of operations
- calculating the UVA equivalents of processes

=== Exploitation ===
To exploit the method means:

- to measure the added-value production, expressed as UVA
- to calculate the UVA cost
- to calculate the costs of products, customers, and sales
- to calculate the results of each sale
- to plot out profitability curves

== Fields of application ==
The UVA method can be applied in industrial, service and distribution enterprises which can be described as a repetitive process network in production, administration, logistic etc. In contrast to companies that work by individual projects.

The best results can be obtained for heterogeneous, complexe entreprises what means commercialising many different products and having many clients.

== Advantages and limitations ==
- precision of calculations and detail of results
- simplicity and ease of use
- time-consuming process of method construction
- relatively few documented applications

== Innovations of the UVA Method ==
The UVA method is not a method of cost allocation. In management accounting, one "cuts up" the whole (= the company) into "pieces" (sections/centres of analysis/activities). Then in the same way, all the expenses are discharged/allocated to each portion that was cut out. This approach may be described as "cost allocation" [as done in traditional bookkeeping]. It is a top-down approach. With the UVA method, one does the reverse—a re-composition: at a micro-scale (namely, at the level of one sale), one identifies each and every element that has helped carry out the sale. Then by adding up all the sale transactions, one recomposes almost all the resources of the company. The only resources that are not allocated directly here are those that are associated with the internal management processes; however, they are to be found in the cost of each transaction, via the UVA cost. This is a bottom-up approach.

The UVA method regards the company as a network of processes. The method makes a precise analysis of all these processes. The novelty of the UVA method is to analyse not only the processes related to sold products, but also the ones related to serving customers.

According to the UVA method, the object of the costing is the sale, not the product. Thanks to this new way of viewing things, product-related costs that were indirect now become direct, as from the viewpoint of a sale, all costs are direct: the cost of sold products, the freight cost, the cost of order processing and invoicing, etc. The difference between the amount that is invoiced to the customer and the cost of the sale gives the result: profit or loss. The UVA method is the only one that allows one to calculate the profitability of each sale.

The profitability curve is one of the most valuable indicators provided by the UVA method. It has been made possible by choosing to view the sale as a cost object. The curve can be plotted out, since one calculates the profitability of each invoice. Thanks to the profitability curve, the account managers determine the structure of the company's result and can make precisely targeted decisions.
