= Darkest Labyrinth =

Japanese record label

- Founded: 2000
- Founder: Kiwamu
- Distributor(s): Daiki Sound (JASDAQ: 3350)
- Genre: Gothic rock, EBM, electro-industrial
- Country of origin: Japan
- Location: Tokyo
- Official website: http://www.starwaverecords.jp/

Starwave Records (formerly Darkest Labyrinth and Cure) is a Tokyo based record label, distributor, and web store specializing in gothic and visual kei artists in genres such as Electro-industrial, darkwave, gothic rock, EBM, and industrial metal.

First called Cure, Starwave Records started as an Osaka-based project to release works by label-owner Kiwamu's own band Blood. The label changed names to Darkest Labyrinth and expanded to distribute music by international Gothic and Post-Industrial artists in Japan. In 2007 the label started to sign other artists, making its first deals with international groups such as Virgins O.R. Pigeons (Greece), Spectrum-X (Italy) and GPKism (Australia). That same year they released their first compilation record "V.A. - Darkest Labyrinth" featuring tracks from Japan's dark underground music scene.

Darkest Labyrinth reached its heyday in 2009, releasing works by a variety of international and Japanese artists. As of March 2009 Darkest Labyrinth had released 50 titles from the label and distributed 280 titles from other labels for Japanese major distribution.

In 2010, the web store rebranded itself as Starwave Records and opened a new facebook account.

The most successful artist on the label was Blood who had sold over 20 000 CDs.

== Roster ==
- Blood
- GPKism
- Spectrum-X
- Noir du'Soleil
- Blamhoney
- SUICIDE ALI
- 2 Bullet
- Rose Noire
- Labaiser
- Seileen
- Marlee
- Takuya Angel
- Angelspit

Note: some artists are only signed to Darkest Labyrinth for Japanese releases, while they are signed to other labels for Europe, North America, etc.

== Labels distributed ==
- Alfa Matrix
- Aural Music
- Deadscarlet Records
- Decadance records
- Sound Base Music
- Thorntree Records
- Subsound Records
- Urgence Disk
- HTD Records

== See also ==
- List of record labels
- List of electronic music record labels
