= RCCA =

RCCA may refer to:

- Rancho Cucamonga, California
- RCCA security, in cryptography
- Revolutionary Communist Cell of Afghanistan
- Roller Coaster Corporation of America
- Root cause and corrective action, in engineering
- Ross Corners Christian Academy, a school in Vestal, New York

== See also ==
- RCA (disambiguation)
