= Risk accounting =

Extensive subject of Management accounting

Risk accounting is a method that quantifies granular exposures to non-financial risks, aggregates them, and accounts for these exposures through expected loss accounting provisions.

== Background ==
Risk accounting is an extension of management accounting, aiming to enhance corporate reporting by measuring and documenting the potential future financial effects of various non-financial risks. These include cyber, supply chain, operational, environmental, geopolitical, conduct, fraud, model, and other types of risks.

Current accounting standards acknowledge that a business may face significant non-financial risks in one period, with the financial impacts of these risks reported in subsequent periods. This practice of recognizing risks and potential profits in one period, followed by reporting financial losses in later periods, can undermine stakeholders' trust in reported accounting profits. Moreover, these standards might allow some businesses and individuals to inadequately address risks concerning investors, customers, the environment, public health and safety, and community welfare.

== Risk accounting method ==
Risk accounting introduces the Risk Unit (RU) to measure non-financial risks, enabling their quantification, aggregation, and reporting. This approach uses three primary metrics: Inherent Risk, which quantifies the pre-mitigation level of non-financial risk in RUs; the Risk Mitigation Index (RMI), assessing the effectiveness of risk mitigation activities on a zero to 100 scale; and Residual Risk, representing the remaining non-financial risk after mitigation.

The methodology refines traditional risk assessments by using numeric weights and risk factors instead of the conventional red, amber, and green (RAG) metrics, allowing for a precise calculation of RMI for each assessed business component.

The non-financial risk Calculation Engine works with accounting systems and enhanced assessments to estimate daily maximum and actual non-financial risk exposures in RUs, considering inherent risks and RMIs.

Risk accounting provides daily non-financial risk analytics by business component, product, customer, and location, facilitating the monitoring of risk exposures against predefined RU-based limits. These analytics allow for comparisons across different organizational levels and between entities, provided the methodology is consistently applied.

== Monetary value of an RU ==
Risk accounting aims to quantify the monetary value of a Risk Unit (RU), termed RUm, by analyzing non-financial risk-related loss data with a specific context, including the relevant RUs and Risk Mitigation Indices (RMIs) at the time of loss. This enables the estimation of expected non-financial risk-related losses by multiplying residual RUs by RUm.

Risk accounting provides daily non-financial risk analytics in RUs across business units, products, customers, and locations, allowing for the monitoring of risk exposures against set risk limits in RUs. This facilitates consistent risk comparison across the organization.

Using statistical models and back-testing to examine the relationship between product-specific non-financial risk exposures in residual RUs and historical loss data may allow for determining RUs' monetary value. This could enhance the accuracy of estimating expected non-financial risk-related losses and potentially provides an alternative to the operational risk regulatory capital calculations specified in the Basel Accords.

== AI-based enterprise data fabric for risk accounting ==
Semantic technologies, such as ontology-based knowledge bases, contribute to the development of enterprise data fabrics by facilitating data integration and improving artificial intelligence (AI) functionalities. These functionalities include detecting and addressing potential cyber threats and conducting advanced risk analytics. This integration forms a knowledge base When integrated with a graph database.

In the context of data integration, a knowledge base acts as a foundational element for a data fabric. The application of semantic technologies notably improves the capabilities of machine learning (ML) and natural language processing (NLP). As a result, ontologies, along with ML and NLP technologies, form a set of tools for implementing a risk accounting framework. This effectiveness stems from their capacity to tackle risk data aggregation challenges and utilize AI agents for enhanced risk and control assessments.
