= RCA (trademark) =

American multinational trademark brand

RCA Trademark Management S.A.
- Product type: Trademark
- Current owner: Talisman Brands; Sony Music Entertainment
- Country: United States
- Introduced: 1919; 107 years ago
- Related brands: RCA Records; RCA International Division; RCA Lyra; RCA Telephones; RCA Audio/Video; RCA Accessories; RCA Televisions; RCA Car Stereo; RCA Appliances; RCA Computers; RCA Computer Tablets; RCA Projectors; RCA Digital TV Box; His Master's Voice
- Markets: Worldwide
- Previous owners: General Electric; Technicolor SA
- Website: rca.com

RCA is a trademark associated with consumer electronics and recorded entertainment. An abbreviation for the Radio Corporation of America (later RCA Corporation), the RCA trademark remained in use following General Electric's takeover of the business in the mid-1980s.

Following the RCA Corporation takeover, the RCA trademark was owned and licensed by General Electric for a wide variety of uses, until the trademark was sold to Thomson SA (later Technicolor SA) in 2003. In 2022, the RCA trademark was sold to Talisman Brands, Inc.

Licensees of the RCA trademark have included Sony Music Entertainment, Voxx International and the ON Corporation.

== Current users ==
At present, the RCA trademark is owned by Talisman Brands, Inc. (d/b/a Established.) since 2022, Though it generally no longer uses the brand directly, Talisman Brands licenses the RCA trademark to other companies for use on various products along 10 different product lines:

- RCA Records (RCA Victor): now licensed to Sony Music Entertainment, which acquired the record label through its former joint venture Sony BMG (2004–08). In 1987, Bertelsmann Music Group (BMG) purchased RCA Records and several subsidiary and associated record labels directly from GE following the acquisition of the RCA Corporation, together with a perpetual license to use the various RCA brands and trademarks (including RCA's interest in the famous Nipper and His Master's Voice trademarks). As a perpetual license, it has survived both GE's sale of the brand name to Thomson and BMG's transfer of RCA Records and associated labels to Sony BMG and later to Sony Music.
- RCA International Division: The division of the Radio Corporation of America responsible for its foreign sales and business interests. Its activities included the sale of products to civilian consumers, television and radio broadcasters, governments, and commercial entities.
- RCA Commercial Electronics: licensed to DTI Services, LLC – an Indianapolis, Indiana based company. They manufacture commercial televisions and commercial LED lighting, acquiring the trademark in 2009.
- RCA Monitors: licensed to DTI Services, LLC – an Indianapolis, Indiana based company. They attained the license in 2023, and released their first products on September 30, 2023.
- RCA Telephones: Formerly manufactured by Thomson SA, sold in 2009 to Telefield North America
- RCA Audio/Video: Manufactured by Voxx, produces RCA DVD players, video cassette recorders, direct broadcast satellite decoders, camcorders, and audio equipment.
- RCA Accessories: Manufactured by Voxx, produces Audio and video connectors, remote controls, keyboards, Computer mice and television antennas.
- RCA Televisions: Manufactured by Curtis International Ltd. (Canada) (Was ON Corporation)
- RCA Car Stereo: Also known as RCA Mobile
- RCA Appliances: Produces RCA brand Microwaves, refrigerators, and ranges marketed by Curtis International Ltd. (Canada)
- RCA Computers: Produces RCA Computers marketed by American Future Technology Corporation
- RCA Computer Tablets: RCA tablets manufactured by Alco Electronics Ltd.
- RCA Projectors: Manufactured by Telefield
- RCA Digital TV Box: Produces RCA Set-top Boxes marketed by Search Commercial Inc. (Philippines).
- RCA Communication Systems: Two-way radios
- His Master's Voice / Victor Electronics: Intellectual property used on consumer electronics.

BMG (for the record labels) and Thomson (for the remaining businesses) bought those assets from General Electric, which took over the RCA Corporation in 1986 and kept RCA's NBC broadcast television interests (GE sold off the NBC Radio Network and the NBC-owned radio stations). Initially, GE retained ownership of the RCA trademarks (including the His Master's Voice/Nipper and Victor/Victrola trademarks for several years, which were then licensed to Thomson and Bertelsmann Music Group. Thomson eventually purchased the rights to the RCA trademarks from GE in 2003 subject to the perpetual license GE had issued to BMG.

In December 2006, Thomson SA agreed to sell its consumer electronics accessory business, including rights to use the RCA name for consumer electronic accessories, to Audiovox

On October 16, 2007, Thomson SA agreed to sell its consumer electronics audio video business outside Europe including the worldwide rights to the RCA Brand for consumer electronics audio video products

In April 2010, ON Corporation took over distribution of RCA branded TVs.

Bertelsmann AG was new to the RCA family (though the creation of Sony BMG is similar to that of EMI more than 70 years earlier). Sony took full ownership of Sony BMG in 2008 and the record company was renamed Sony Music. Thomson started as the French subsidiary of Thomson-Houston Electric, a company which later evolved into General Electric.

In 2022, Technicolor SA sold the trademark and licensing rights to the RCA brand and logos to Talisman Brands, Inc.

== Sponsorship ==
RCA sponsored the Argentinian football club San Lorenzo de Almagro from 2005 until 2007, and the Argentinian football club Estudiantes de La Plata from 2008 to mid-2011. In 2018, it sponsored Racing Club de Avellaneda, another first division Argentinean football club.

In the mid-1990s, RCA bought the naming rights to the Hoosier Dome (the original home of the Indianapolis Colts). The stadium became the RCA Dome and was known as such until it was demolished in December 2008 when the Colts departed for the new Lucas Oil Stadium and the Indiana Convention Center was expanded onto the RCA Dome footprint.

RCA was the main sponsor for the No. 98 Cale Yarborough Motorsports team in the NASCAR Winston Cup Series with drivers Jeremy Mayfield from 1995–1996 and with John Andretti in 1997. They appeared on the No. 00 Quin Houff in 2021 as a throwback to the above mentioned No. 98 car. In 2026, RCA announced that they would be sponsoring Michael McDowell's No. 71 car for 3 races.
