= Nekocon =

Anime convention held in Hampton, Virginia

Coordinates: 37°2′13″N 76°22′55″W

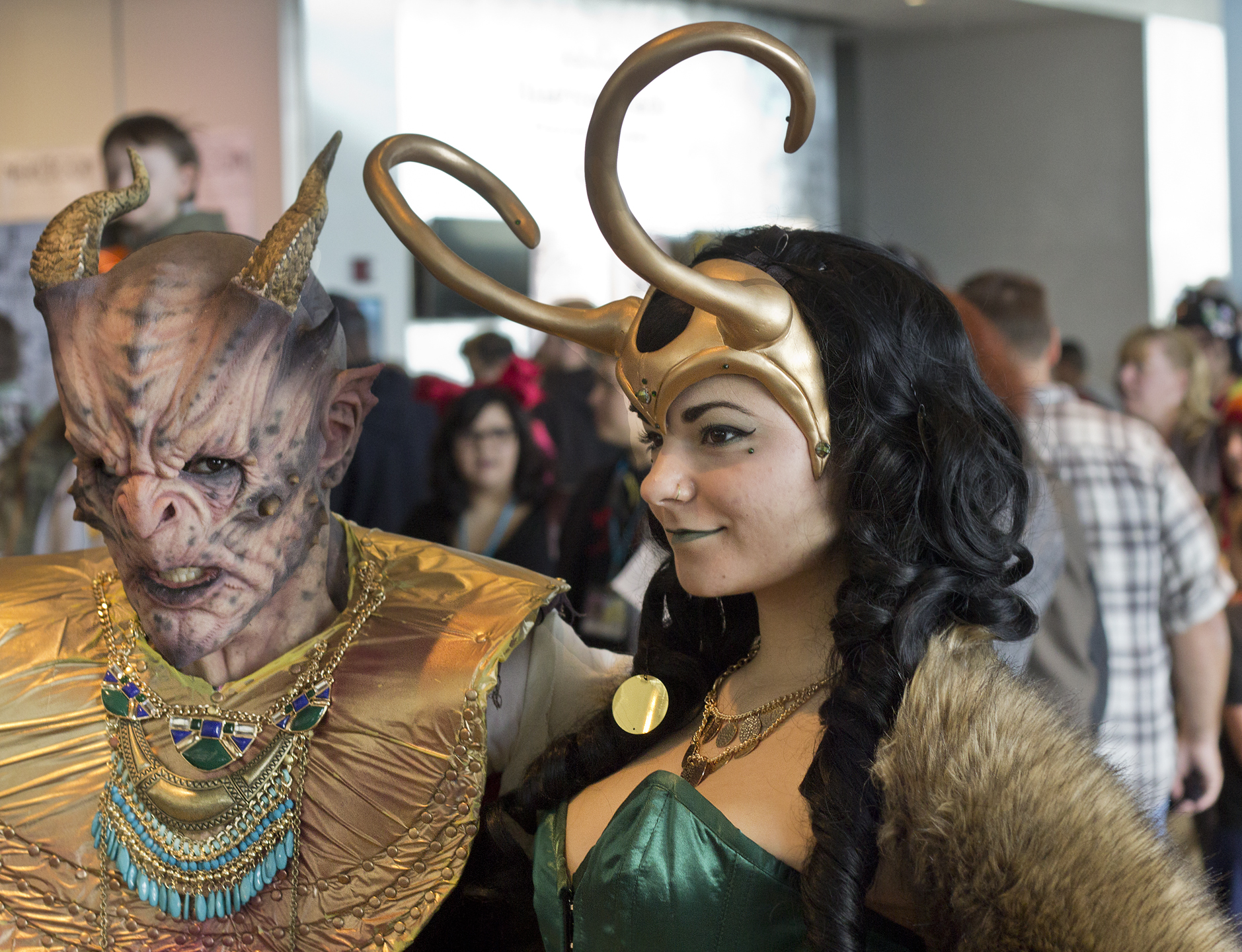
- Cosplayers at Nekocon, 2014
- Status: Active
- Genre: Anime, Asian culture
- Venue: Hampton Roads Convention Center
- Location: Hampton, Virginia
- Country: United States
- Inaugurated: 1998
- Attendance: 6,900 in 2014
- Website: www.nekocon.com

Nekocon is an annual three-day anime convention held traditionally on the first weekend in November at the Hampton Roads Convention Center in Hampton, Virginia. It is Virginia's oldest anime convention. The convention's name comes from the Japanese word neko, meaning "cat".

== Programming ==
The convention typically offers art shows, artist's alley, autograph sessions, card game tournaments, charity auction, concerts, costume competition, dances, dealer's room, fashion show, karaoke contests, kimono/tea ceremony workshop, maid cafe, music video contest, panels, Q&A sessions, role playing, tabletop games, vendors, video game tournaments, video rooms, and workshops. Nekocon's 2015 charity events benefited Be The Match. More than $7,000 was raised in 2023 for the Carolina Manga Library and Heritage Humane Society. Nekocon's 2025 charities included the Carolina Manga Library and Hampton Roads Cancer Care Foundation, for which the convention raised $7,249.

== History ==
An attendance cap of 1,600 passes was instituted in 2003 due to fire code regulations. The convention held its first J-rock concert in 2009, hosting Suicide Ali. Virginia Air and Space Center provided content during the 2012 convention. Nekocon in 2017 had an Anime style cooking challenge with students from the Culinary Institute of Virginia. Nekocon 2020 was cancelled due to the COVID-19 pandemic.

=== Event history ===
Dates	Location	Atten.	Guests
October 2–4, 1998	Holiday Inn Executive Center; Virginia Beach, Virginia	506	Steve Bennett, Jessica Calvello, Robert DeJesus, Colleen Doran, Pat Duke, Kuni Kimura, Hiroyuki Kitazume, Tristan MacAvery, Stephen B. Pearl, Fred Perry, Jan Scott-Frazier, Jeff Thompson, Elin Winkler, and Toshifumi Yoshida.
November 5–7, 1999	Holiday Inn Executive Center; Virginia Beach, Virginia	1,048	Steve Bennett, Michael Brady, Colleen Doran, Pat Duke, Kuni Kimura, Hiroyuki Kitazume, Tristan MacAvery, Steve Pearl, Jan Scott-Frazier, Elin Winkler, and Toshifumi Yoshida.
October 27–29, 2000	Holiday Inn / Chesapeake Conference Center; Chesapeake, Virginia	1,100	Steve Bennett, Michael Brady, Robert DeJesus, Colleen Doran, Nickey Froberg, Elizabeth Kirkindall, Shin Kurokawa, Rachael Lillis, Tristan MacAvery, and Jan Scott-Frazier.
October 26–28, 2001	Holiday Inn Executive Center; Virginia Beach, Virginia	1,450	Nickey Froberg.
November 8–10, 2002	Holiday Inn Executive Center; Virginia Beach, Virginia		John Barrett, Steve Bennett, T. Campbell, Robert DeJesus, Kara Dennison, Colleen Doran, Brian Drummond, Fred Perry, Deb Rabbai, Jan Scott-Frazier, Rikki Simons, Jeff Thompson, Tavisha Wolfgarth-Simons, and Toshifumi Yoshida.
November 7–9, 2003	Holiday Inn Executive Center; Virginia Beach, Virginia	1,600	Greg Ayres, John Barrett, Steve Bennett, Tim Buckley, Emily DeJesus, Robert DeJesus, Christy Lijewski, Chris Patton, Fred Perry, Deb Rabbai, Monica Rial, and Jan Scott-Frazier.
November 5–7, 2004	Chesapeake Convention Center; Chesapeake, Virginia	2,368	Greg Ayres, Steve Bennett, Tim Buckley, Emily DeJesus, Robert DeJesus, Dizzy, Tiffany Grant, Trish Ledoux, Fred Perry, Monica Rial, Carrie Savage, Jan Scott-Frazier, Michael "Mookie" Terracciano, Shawn the Touched, and Toshifumi Yoshida.
November 4–6, 2005	Hampton Roads Convention Center; Hampton, Virginia		Greg Ayres, Laura Bailey, Steve Bennett, Colleen Clinkenbeard, Jason Cumberledge, Emily DeJesus, Robert DeJesus, Dizzy, Jerry Jewell, Mike McFarland, Novablade Studios, Jen Starling, Renee Starling, Sonny Strait, Donnie Sturges, Michael "Mookie" Terracciano, and Danny Valentini.
November 3–5, 2006	Hampton Roads Convention Center; Hampton, Virginia	2,500+ (est)	Christopher Ayres, Greg Ayres, JL Brown, Luci Christian, Jason Cumberledge, Emily DeJesus, Robert DeJesus, Brian Godwin, Tiffany Grant, Mike Hall, Brittney Karbowski, Bettina M. Kurkoski, Dave Lister, Monica Rial, Doug Smith, Jen Starling, Renee Starling, Donnie Sturges, and Danny Valentini.
November 2–4, 2007	Hampton Roads Convention Center; Hampton, Virginia	3,249	Christopher Ayres, Greg Ayres, Troy Baker, Eirik Blackwolf, Ron Chiu, Emily DeJesus, Aaron Dismuke, Daniel Kevin Harrison, Jerry Jewell, Michele Knotz, Bettina M. Kurkoski, Christy Lijewski, Dave Lister, Chris "Kilika" Malone, Bill Rogers, Leo Saunders, Joe Silver, Donnie Sturges, Jamie Sturges, Michael "Mookie" Terracciano, Danny Valentini, and Travis Willingham.
November 7–9, 2008	Hampton Roads Convention Center; Hampton, Virginia	Nearly 3,500	Christopher Ayres, Greg Ayres, Troy Baker, Emily DeJesus, Robert DeJesus, Aaron Dismuke, echostream, GPKISM, Mohammad "Hawk" Haque, Jerry Jewell, Bettina M. Kurkoski, Dave Lister, Steven Napierski, and Ananth Panagariya.
November 6–8, 2009	Hampton Roads Convention Center; Hampton, Virginia	3,429	Greg Ayres, Colleen Clinkenbeard, Richard Epcar, Newton Ewell, Caitlin Glass, Mike Hall, Kyle Hebert, Steve Napierski, Tony Oliver, Fred Perry, Ellyn Stern, Donnie Sturges, Jamie Sturges, Suicide Ali, Tainted Reality, and Danny Valentini.
November 5–7, 2010	Hampton Roads Convention Center; Hampton, Virginia	3,788	501st Legion, Greg Ayres, Richard Ian Cox, Lar DeSouza, Newton Ewell, Yan "Kern" Gagne, Mary "Kite" Garren, Garth Graham, Mike Hall, Bettina M. Kurkoski, Chris Rager, Ryan Sohmer, Akemi Solloway, The Sound Bee HD, Donnie Sturges, Ryan Thompson, Danny Valentini, and Cristina Vee.
November 4–6, 2011	Hampton Roads Convention Center; Hampton, Virginia	4,487	Takuya Angel, Born, Leah Clark, MC Frontalot, Kyle Hebert, DJ Hip*Starr, Jerry Jewell, Donald Kinney, Taku Otsuka, Chris Rager, Akemi Solloway, Tainted Reality, VJ ValuJet, and David L. Williams.
November 2–4, 2012	Hampton Roads Convention Center; Hampton, Virginia		Chris Cason, Chin Hamaya Culture Center, Mikako Joho, DJ KaKuMeI X, DJ Midget, Tony Oliver, The OneUps, Brina Palencia, Re:VB-P, Jan Scott-Frazier, The Slants, J. Michael Tatum, and Hiro Usuda.
November 1–3, 2013	Hampton Roads Convention Center; Hampton, Virginia		Steve Blum, Anthony Burch, Ashly Burch, Chin Hamaya Culture Center, Jonathan Coulton, Yan "Kern" Gagne, Mary "Kite" Garren, DJ HeavyGrinder, Cherami Leigh, Mike McFarland, Chris Rager, and John Swasey.
November 7–9, 2014	Hampton Roads Convention Center; Hampton, Virginia	7,100	Dr. Awkward, Jessie James Grelle, Todd Haberkorn, Kyle Hebert, KristyBee!, Lauren Landa, Jason Charles Miller, Jez Roth, Sayaka Sasaki, Schäffer the Darklord, Tribe One, and Adam WarRock.
November 6–8, 2015	Hampton Roads Convention Center; Hampton, Virginia		Dr. Awkward, Breathlessaire, Kira Buckland, Erik Scott Kimerer, Hiroshi Kitadani, Erica Lindbeck, Erica Mendez, Professor Shyguy, RinRin Doll, Starlighthoney, Tribe One, David Vincent, and Sarah Anne Williams.
November 4–6, 2016	Hampton Roads Convention Center; Hampton, Virginia		Akinori Isobe, Masumi Kano, Lauren Landa, Cherami Leigh, Mike McFarland, Bryce Papenbrook, Vocamerica, and Lisle Wilkerson.
November 3–5, 2017	Hampton Roads Convention Center; Hampton, Virginia	6,900	Aimee Blackschleger, Kira Buckland, Colleen Clinkenbeard, Diana Garnet, Kyle Hebert, Joe Inoue, Kyle McCarley, and Jez Roth.
November 2–3, 2018	Hampton Roads Convention Center; Hampton, Virginia		Bennett Abara, Greg Ayres, Caitlin Glass, haru, Lauren Landa, Tyson Rinehart, Michelle Ruff, Tara Sands, and Eric Stuart.
November 1–3, 2019	Hampton Roads Convention Center; Hampton, Virginia		Ray Chase, Robbie Daymond, John Gremillion, Hollow Mellow, Mela Lee, Max Mittelman, Michael Sinterniklaas, Paul St. Peter, and Lex Winter.
November 5–7, 2021	Hampton Roads Convention Center; Hampton, Virginia		Johnny Yong Bosch, Todd Haberkorn, Jill Harris, Greg Houser, Dallas Reid, David Vincent, Mark Whitten, Brandon Winckler, and Mick Wingert.
November 4–6, 2022	Hampton Roads Convention Center; Hampton, Virginia		Jon Allen, Morgan Berry, Beau Billingslea, Griffin Burns, Megan Hollingshead, Ezra Weisz, and Lex Winter.
November 3-5, 2023	Hampton Roads Convention Center; Hampton, Virginia	6,022	David Adkins, Erik Scott Kimerer, Cricket Leigh, Dave Trosko, Wig-Wig Cosplay, Sarah Anne Williams, and Brandon Winckler.
November 1-3, 2024	Hampton Roads Convention Center; Hampton, Virginia	About 7,000	Greg Houser, Stephanie Nadolny, Katriel Paige, Pros and Cons Cosplay, Sam Slade, Steve Staley, Dave Trosko, David Vincent, and Lex Winter.
October 31 - November 2, 2025	Hampton Roads Convention Center; Hampton, Virginia	7,412	Catero Colbert, Greg Houser, Kazha, Steve Kramer, Wendee Lee, Tony Oliver, Michael Sorich, and Paul St. Peter.
November 6-8, 2026	Hampton Roads Convention Center; Hampton, Virginia		Jon Allen, Tiana Camacho, Kimberley Anne Campbell, Chris Niosi, and Bill Rogers.
