= Convención de Juegos de Mesa y Comics =

Fan convention in Monterrey, Mexico

- Status: Active
- Genre: Comic Book, Anime, Video Games, Science fiction & Gaming
- Venue: Cintermex
- Locations: Monterrey, Nuevo Leon
- Country: Mexico
- Inaugurated: 1992
- Attendance: +25,000
- Organizer: Entretenimiento Creativo
- Website: http://www.ecreativo.com/

Convención de Juegos de Mesa y Comics is a multi-genre convention held bi-annually in Monterrey, Mexico, by Entretenimiento Creativo SA de CV. It is dedicated to anime, comic books, science fiction, fantasy, video games, trading card games and board games.

The Convención de Juegos de Mesa y Comics features panels, conferences, gaming, video games area, karaoke, Japanese culture area, adult gaming, anime video room, music programming, celebrities, artists, voice actors, contests, tournaments and exhibitors.

== Previous guests of honor ==
- Iyari Limon from Buffy the Vampire Slayer
- Virginia Hey from Farscape
- Sean Astin from The Lord of the Rings
- Ron Perlman from Hellboy
- Marina Sirtis from Star Trek: The Next Generation
- Michael Rosenbaum from Smallville (Canceled a week before show due to production of Season 7)
- Tahmoh Penikett from Battlestar Galactica
- Doug Jones from Hellboy
- Striken (band) from Monterrey
- Cesar "Sangre Otaku" Franco (Digimon) from Mexico

== Previous musical guests ==
- Swinging Popsicle
- Bespa Kumamero

== CJMC 2010 ==
- November 20–22, 2010
  - Musical Guests: Aural Vampire, Anghelo, Iruma Rioka
  - Spanish Voice Actors: Caco Aliaga, Jose Manuel Vieiria, Hugo Nuñez
  - Comic Book Artists: Edgar Delgado
  - Special Guest: David Rojas Paranormal Expert
  - Special Events: Qualifier for the Yamato Cosplay Cup
  - Contests: Cosplay, Drawing, Karaoke, Lady Gothic, Graffiti, Modelism
