= Institute of Certified Management Accountants =

Australian managerial accounting-focused organization

- Formation: 1996; 30 years ago
- Legal status: Professional Society
- Headquarters: Melbourne, Victoria, Australia
- Region served: Australia; Africa; Asia; Canada; Europe
- Website: cmaaustralia.edu.au

The Institute of Certified Management Accountants (ICMA) is an Australian professional accounting body operating globally, focused on management accounting.

== History ==
The ICMA became a legal reality when its first Constitution was adopted on 11 October 1996; and subsequently incorporated under the Associations Incorporation Act 1981 (Victoria) on 12 November 1996.

In March 1997, at a meeting of the Founding Members, it was decided that Leon Duval (a practicing chartered accountant and management accountant of some 25 years standing) be elected as Interim-President. A room in Duval's office at Suite 6, 242 Hawthorn Road, Caulfield, was the first address and secretariat of ICMA.

Under Duval's name, letters of invitation were sent to over 150 leading professionals and academics in the field of management accounting, to join the new institute as Foundation Members. Almost immediately 75 individuals accepted the invitation. The initial Executive Committee of the Institute was drawn from its Foundation Members.

Today, ICMA is a full-service institute for its members and other stakeholders. The services provided by ICMA Secretariat include maintaining the corporate website that is in keeping with the international profile of ICMA; which includes the designing and maintaining a Members Only area on the website. ICMA publishes 6 copies of the On Target eNewsletter annually, and has a bi-annual research journal, Management Accounting Frontiers (MAF). It maintains a Library by over 12,000 texts and professional and academic publications.

ICMA also provides the training and conducts examinations for its education program in all of its Regional and Branch locations and in over 20 other countries where students undertake the CMA program by online and via distance education. ICMA maintains the CEO Blog, with links to LinkedIn and Twitter. For those members who already possess the CMA, ICMA provides Continuing Professional Development (CPD) opportunities to members via its Certificates of Proficiency.

The ICMA is accredited by the Commonwealth of Nations under the category of Civic Organisations.

== Education Program ==
The flagship CMA Preparatory Program consists of two subjects, Strategic Cost Management and Strategic Business Analysis for which the entry criterion is either a degree in accounting or a recognised professional qualification in accounting. The CMA Preparatory Program was only open to those with a university degree in accounting; or a recognised professional qualification in accounting. In addition to passing the two subjects, one needed to have 5-years of business experience to qualify as a Certified Management Accountant (CMA). Thus, ICMA designed the first post-graduate level management accounting qualification in the world. There were other unique aspects to ICMA's Education program. It was the first professional body in the world to embed its CMA subjects within master's degree programs in accredited universities; and allow those universities to examine students internally. Today, many other professional bodies have followed this lead.

== Membership Grades and Pathways ==
The Institute has the following grades of membership:

1. Fellow Certified Management Accountant (FCMA);
2. Certified Management Accountant (CMA);
3. Associate Management Accountant (AMA);
4. Graduate Management Accountant (GMA);
5. Registered Business Accountant (RBA);
6. Registered Cost Accountant (RCA);
7. Certified Accounting Technician (CAT);
8. Student member and
9. Honorary member for distinguished persons for services to Management Accounting and related disciplines.

Each of these membership levels follows the ICMA Education program requiring different educational achievements and experience.

Individuals can obtain ICMA membership via a number of possible pathways. There are different education and experience requirements for: (a) University Graduates in Accounting/Finance; (b) MBA Degree Holders; (c) University Graduates with Non-Accounting Degrees; (d) Diploma and Advanced Diploma Holders in Accounting; (e) Members of Other Professional Accounting Bodies; (f) Members of Other Professional Non-Accounting Bodies; (g) Part Qualified Students of Other Professional Accounting Bodies: (h) School Leavers and (i) Academics.

== Research and publications ==
=== Newsletter ===
The On Target newsletter (bi-monthly) was mailed to members from September 1997 to February 2011. ICMA decided to stop the print format of a magazine to members and launched an electronic Newsletter that could be downloaded in pdf form in February 2011. Today, the articles for On Target Direct are uploaded continuously in the Members’ Area of the Institute's website. The contents are also sent as an e-journal on a monthly basis to financial members; and a pdf version of On Target is emailed to them bi-monthly.

In addition to the Newsletters, a Yearbook with a report to members and significant articles has been sent out since 2011.

=== Research Journal ===
The Journal of Applied Management Accounting Research (JAMAR) was launched in 2002, with the joint-editors being (at the time of launch) Professor Garry Marchant of the University of Melbourne and Professor Janek Ratnatunga, the Chair of Business Accounting at Monash University. The journal was published both in print form and online. It was published bi-annually in both print and electronic formats. JAMAR is catalogued by the ProQuest and Cabell's Research publication directories. In 2018, Management Accounting Frontiers (MAF) replaced the Journal of Applied Management Accounting Research as the research journal of the Institute of Certified Management Accountants, Australia. The primary aim of the MAF is to advance research and practice of management accounting by providing a forum for disseminating knowledge and insight of the discipline. In addition, the journal aims to facilitate the developments of management accounting education by encouraging communication between researchers and practitioners.

=== Library ===
The Library holds over 12,000 texts and professional and academic publications, and is regarded as one of the leading collections in Australia in the professional fields of management accounting and risk management.

=== Research Bodies ===
In 2009 the institute established two non-profit companies. The Institute of Certified Carbon Analysts and Auditors (ICCAA) was established to undertake research into the emerging area of carbonomics; and to develop an education program to train an individual to qualify as a Certified Carbon Analyst and Auditor (CCAA).

The second research and training body was the Institute for the Advancement of Corporate Reporting and Assurance (IACRA); established to undertake research into integrated reporting and assurance; and to develop an education program to train an individual to qualify as a Certified Reporting and Assurance Analyst (CRAA).

Both these qualifications are registered ICMA trademarks.

In November 2012, the ICCAA got full admission as an observer organisation of the United Nations Framework Convention on Climate Change (UNFCCC).This was a significant achievement in terms of global recognition.

== Global Activities ==
ICMA has over 10,000 qualified professionals worldwide, with members in 50-countries. Its CMA postgraduate education program now is firmly established in 19 overseas markets, namely Bangladesh, Cambodia, China, Cyprus, the Emirate of Dubai, Hong Kong, India, Indonesia, Iran, Japan, Lebanon, Malaysia, Nepal, New Zealand, Papua New Guinea, Philippines, Singapore, Sri Lanka, Thailand and Vietnam.

To facilitate its educational objectives, the Institute has accredited a number of universities which have master's degree subjects that are equivalent to the CMA program. Some of these universities also provide in-house training and examinations of the CMA program. Accounting graduates can do CMA accredited units at these universities to qualify for CMA status. The ICMA also has a number of Recognised Provider Institutions (RPIs) that run the CMA program in Australia and overseas. The CMA program is also available online in regions where the face-to-face delivery of the program is not possible.

ICMA also has global activities in the following markets:

- Continuing Education Market: ICMA has recognised that there is an executive market that requires specialised training in specific areas. As such it has commissioned the development of a series of Certificates of Proficiency in varied topics.
- Higher Education Market: ICMA has recognised many members are looking for further education via a Master of Business Administration (MBA) and those that have an MBA, are looking for a Doctor of Business Administration (DBA). As such, ICMA has sponsored the development of an MBA and a DBA program specifically to its members via Calwest University in California, United States.
- High-Flyer Student Market: ICMA has decided not to focus only on experienced executives; but also focus on the next generation of management accountants. As such it has introduced the Emerging Professional Scholarship Program to train the next generation of management accountants.
- Business Graduates Market: ICMA has recognised that there are senior managers who are not interested in becoming accountants. As such it has introduced a new certified qualification; the Certified Global Business Analyst (CGBA) for those interested in finance and business analysis, but not interested in continuing further to become CMAs. This qualification is tailored to senior managers who have degrees or professional qualifications in all business fields (marketing, management, finance, banking, accounting etc.).
- Islamic Professional Education Market: There is strong demand from Islamic countries for a 4-day program for already qualified generalist accountants to be versed in Islamic Accounting & Auditing and Islamic banking and finance. As such ICMA is proposing to launch a Certified Islamic Public Accountant (CIPA) professional qualification in 2017.

In 2014, ICMA launched of the International Management Accounting Collaborative (IMAC). ICMA was the founder charter member of the IMAC, which is now the global organization for the management accountancy profession dedicated to serving the public interest by strengthening the profession and contributing to the development of strong international economies. IMAC is particularly committed to enhancing the decision-making capabilities of organisations; and in promoting good governance, risk management and sustainability, which are the key elements in achieving long term social, environmental and economic performance, and in enhancing investor and other stakeholder confidence. Professional management accountants have an important role to play in these areas, and IMAC is uniquely positioned to support member bodies in enhancing the competence and expertise of their members.

To commemorate its 20th anniversary, ICMA established the Global Accounting Hall of Fame and the Management Accounting Hall of Fame in Australia and each of the regions ICMA operated in.

The Accounting Hall of Fame is a general award open to all accountants, CFOs etc., Financial and Managerial. There will be an academic and practitioner award in this category.

The Management Accounting Hall of Fame.is an award open only to managerial accountants, CFOs, Strategy Analysts etc. (i.e. those not doing compliance work). There will be an academic and practitioner award in this category.

== Strategic Alliances ==
ICMA has Strategic Alliances with the following organisations:

=== Universities ===
- Diponegoro University of Semarang
- Hasanuddin University
- Mercu Buana University
- Politeknik Negeri Malang, Indonesia
- State University of Malang
- STIE Asia Malang, Indonesia
- STIE Dewantara Jombang, Indonesia
- STIE Widyagama Lumajang, Indonesia
- Uniuersitas Widyagama Malang, Indonesia
- Univasitas Muhammadiya Jember, Indonesia
- Universitas Islam Malang Indonesia
- Universitas Negeri Jember, Indonesia
- Universitas Negeri Surabaya, Indonesia
- Universitas of Ciputra, Surabaya, Indonesia
- Universitas Pelita Harapan Medan
- Universitas Yudharta Pasuruan, Indonesia
- University of Merdeka Malang
- University of Trisakti
- University of Udayana
- YKPN School of Economics Yogyakarta
- Xavier University Bhubaneswar

=== Professional Bodies ===
- Institute of Chartered Management Accountants of Papua New Guinea (ICMAPNG)
- Lao Chamber of Professional Accountants and Auditors
- Myanmar Institute of Certified Public Accountants (MICPA)
- Society of Professional Accountants of Canada (SPAC)
- The Indonesian Institute of Management Accountants (IAMI)
- Vietnam Association of Certified Public Accountants (VACPA)
- Chartered Accountants of Indonesia – Solo (IAI)
- Chartered Accountants of Indonesia – Malang (IAI)
