= Aural Vampire =

Japanese musical group

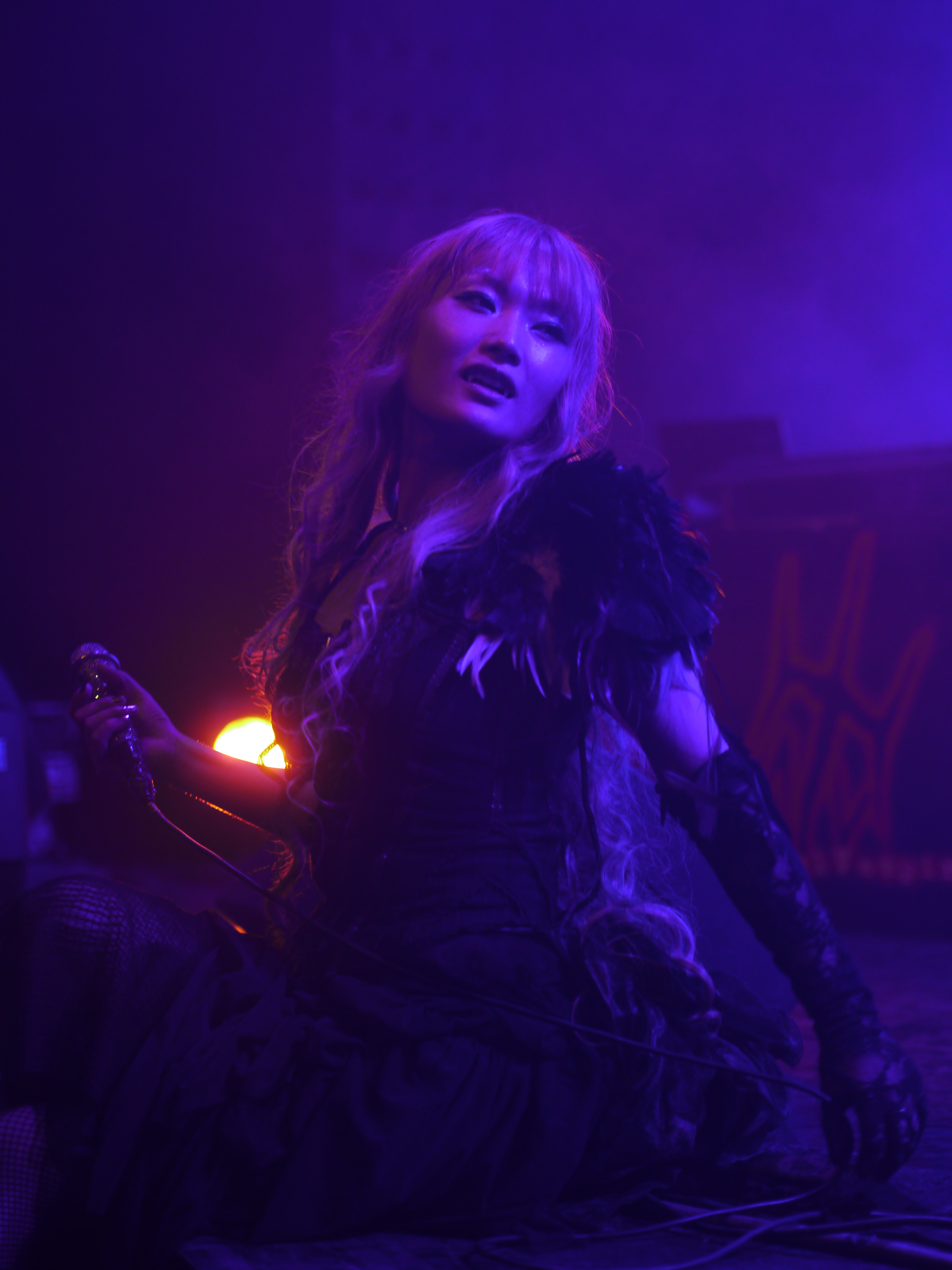
- Lead singer, EXO-CHIKA, performing at Mang'Azur in 2013

Background information
- Origin: Tokyo, Honshū, Japan
- Genres: Electronica, darkwave, Electro-industrial
- Years active: 2000–present
- Labels: Avex Trax; Gan-Shin (EU); Bishi Bishi (EU); Yottabyte Records
- Members: EXO-CHIKA; RAVEMAN
- Website: AuralVampire.com

Aural Vampire (オーラルヴァンパイア, ōraru vanpaia) is a Japanese group (formerly duo) led by EXO-CHIKA (vocals/lyrics) and RAVEMAN (music) from Tokyo, Japan.

== History ==
EXO-CHIKA and RAVEMAN met at high school, where they experimented with writing songs. They recorded several tapes together, eventually performing as a duo alongside their friends' hardcore band. After this first performance, they began to perform live shows and record tapes under the name Aural Vampire.

Aural Vampire released an indie album Vampire Ecstasy in 2004 and a single called Death Folder in 2005 that was made available to download online.

In 2008, the band announced they had been signed to the label Avex Trax and, at the end of the year, they released a set of three self-titled EPs on iTunes. Their second album Zoltank was released on May 5, 2010.

In 2008 and 2010, Aural Vampire made musical appearances at the annual Anime Matsuri in Houston, Texas. In 2009, Aural Vampire made a musical appearance at Katsucon 15, as well as at AnimagiC in Germany. Aural Vampire toured North America in 2010 as a support act for the Canadian band The Birthday Massacre, making musical appearances at Anime Central and Convencion de Juegos de Mesa y Comics.

Aural Vampire released an EP, Kerguelen Vortex, on November 18, 2011.

EXO-CHIKA has made a guest appearance in the visual kei band AND -Eccentric Agent-'s promotional video for the song LIBERATE.

Aural Vampire created and performed a song for the video game Let It Die.

== Members ==
2004-present

- EXO-CHIKA (エキゾチカ) - Vocals, Lyrics
- RAVEMAN (レイブマン) - Total Sound Master

2012-present

- Wu-CHY - Bass
- Higuchuuhei (ヒグチユーヘイ) - Guitar
- ZEN - Keyboard
- IZU - Drums

== Discography ==
Album studio

- Vampire Ecstasy (2004)
- Zoltank (2010)
- Razors on Backstreet (2014)
- MIMIC YOUR HAIRSTYLE (2015)

EP

- Death Folder (2005)
- Aural Vampire (2008)
- Kerguelen Vortex (2011)
- Ninja vs Amazones (2018)
- WANI (2023)
- ZOMBIE NAOCCHATTE (2025)

Singles

- BOSS ON PARADE (Aural Vampire's BLAST-O-MATIC) (With Dj Technorch, 2007)
- Blood (Feat. EXO-CHIKA) (With BLOOD, 2008)
- Freeeeze!! (2009)
- Soloween (2012)
- Mainazuma 13 (With Dj Technorch, 2017)
- Bloodline 血統 2091 (By Megahit feat. Aural Vampire, 2021)

Other works

RAVEMAN composed most of the tracks in the album: "code:Real" (2023) by the trio "QueeenMarionette".
