= Soloween =

Single by Aural Vampire

from the album Razors on Backstreet
- B-side: "Halloween Jitterbug"; "Back to Halloween"
- Released: October 10, 2012
- Recorded: 2012
- Genre: Darkwave, synthpop, gothic rock
- Length: 4:26
- Label: Yottabyte Records
- Producer(s): Raveman

Aural Vampire singles chronology
"'"Freeeeze!!"'" (2009)	"Soloween" (2012)

Music video
- Official Video on YouTube

Soloween (ソロウィン, Sorouin) is the second single by the Japanese Darkwave duo, Aural Vampire, released on October 10, 2012. The single is the second release from their album Razors on Backstreet, after the Kerguelen Vortex EP. This is the first release from the newly formed Aural Vampire with four new members. The music video for Soloween is animated and made by their member Raveman.

== Track listing ==
No.	Title	Length
1.	"Soloween (ソロウィン, Sorouin)"	4:26
2.	"Halloween Jitterbug (ハロウィンジルバ, Harouin Jiruba)"	4:17
3.	"Back to Halloween"	4:22
4.	"Soloween (ソロウィン, Sorouin) (instrumental)"	4:26
5.	"Halloween Jitterbug (ハロウィンジルバ, Harouin Jiruba) (instrumental)"	4:17
6.	"Back to Halloween (instrumental)"	4:22
Total length:		26:10

== Personnel ==
- Exo-Chika – vocals
- Raveman – production, lyrics
- Wu-Chy – bass
- Higuchuuhei – guitar
- Zen – keyboard
- Izu – drums

== Reception ==
=== Charts ===
Chart (2012)	Peak position
Japan Oricon Singles	193
Japan Oricon Independent Singles	9
