= Institute of Management Accountants =

Organization of managerial accountants

- Abbreviation: IMA
- Formation: 1919; 107 years ago
- Founded at: Buffalo, New York
- Headquarters: Montvale, New Jersey, U.S.
- Members: 140,000
- Website: www.imanet.org

The Institute of Management Accountants (IMA), formerly known as the National Association of Cost Accountants (NACA), is a professional organization of accountants.

== History ==
IMA was founded in 1919 in Buffalo, New York, as the National Association of Cost Accountants, later changing its name to IMA in 1957. It has its headquarters in Montvale, New Jersey, United States, and regional offices in Americas, Asia/Pacific, Europe, and Middle East/India. In 1969, it formed the management accounting practices committee that was entrusted with the task of promoting management accounting as a core area of study in line with IMA views. It had 12 members from several accounting bodies like the Financial Accounting Standards Board and other major accounting regulatory bodies. The representatives of the MAP were recognized for their expertise in accounting. The committee later merged with Foundation for applied research, forming the MAC/FAR committee.

== Timeline ==
- 1919: Founding of the National Association of Cost Accountants (NACA) in Buffalo, N.Y., forerunner of the IMA
- 1920: First chapter of NACA formed in Chicago / First NACA Annual Conference held in Atlantic City
- 1925: NACA Bulletin introduced
- 1935: Library established at NACA national office
- 1943: First international chapter chartered
- 1945: Research committee established
- 1949: NACA Bulletin became monthly publication
- 1957: NACA became National Association of Accountants (NAA)
- 1959: Student Publication Services inaugurated
- 1969: Management Accounting Practices Committee established
- 1972: Certified Management Accountant (CMA®) program created / The first Statement on Management Accounting (SMA), Concepts for Contract Costing, issued
- 1983: Standards of Ethical Conduct of Management Accountants, the first code of ethics for management accountants in the U.S., issued
- 1989: Financial Executive of the Year Award (FEYA) program established
- 1991: National Association of Accountants became the Institute of Management Accountants (IMA)
- 1992: IMA became a founding member of the Committee of Sponsoring Organizations of the Treadway Commission (COSO), a private-sector organization dedicated to improving the quality of financial reporting
- 1994: IMA Foundation for Applied Research (FAR) formed for the advancement of management accounting
- 1996: IMA established the Certified Financial Manager (CFM®) program
- 1999: IMA relaunched and renamed its flagship magazine, Strategic Finance, which also became available online / Management Accounting Quarterly debuted Fall 1999
- 2000: First IMA Student Conference held in Colorado Springs
- 2006: First IMA Global Conference held in Dubai, UAE
- 2009: LinkUp IMA, exclusive online professional community, launched
- 2013: IMA became a member of IFAC
- 2015: IMA announced partnership with Wiley and Miles Education to offer CMA courses in India
- 2017: IMA established Certified in Strategy and Competitive Analysis (CSCA®) program.
- 2018: IMA hits 100,000th member mark
- 2019: IMA released a book title 100 years and counting - a history of institute of management accountants
- 2020: IMA released two reports on revenue management and profitability analytics during COVID-19
- 2023: IMA established Financial and Managerial Accounting Associate (FMAA™) program.

== Accounting certification ==
Additionally IMA provides certification, the Certified Management Accountant (CMA), for internal financial management responsibilities, including planning, budgeting, business reporting, decision analysis and risk management. The Institute of Certified Management Accountants (ICMA) is the certification division of IMA which awards the Certified Management Accountant (CMA) and Certified in Strategy and Competitive Analysis (CSCA) designations. CMA curriculum includes subjects like strategic management, reporting and control, technology and analytics, leadership, business acumen and operations, and professional values and ethics.

=== Certified management accountant (CMA) ===
The CMA exam has two parts. Part 1 covers Financial Reporting, Planning, Performance, and Control. It includes: External Financial Reporting Decisions, Planning, budgeting, forecasting, performance management, cost management and internal controls. Part 2 covers Financial Decision Making and includes financial statement analysis, corporate finance, decision analysis, risk management, investment decisions & Professional Ethics. From 2020, part 1 will include Technology and analytics component into its syllabus. This is to ensure CMA students are well versed with latest technological advancement which affects their future or current jobs. The worldwide pass rate for the exam is 35% for Part I and 49% for Part II in 2014.

=== Requirements ===
To be certified as a CMA, candidates must fulfill both an education requirement and an experience requirement in addition to passing the exam.

1. Bachelor's degree from an accredited college or university
2. Foundational knowledge of economics, basic statistics, and financial accounting
3. Two continuous years of professional experience employing the principles of management accounting and financial management including a specified list of fields.

For certified CMAs, CPE credits are required to maintain active status.

The CMA is a recognized certification among employers. CMA has better Career in Management Accounting than institute of Cost Accountants in SAARC nations.

In its latest salary survey, IMA finds the median income for CMAs is about 28% higher in the U.S. than for their peers without the designation. Globally the survey finds CMAs earn 62% more in median salary and 67% more in median total compensation than non-CMAs.

CMAs are well-represented within Fortune 500 companies as the certification is especially relevant to larger companies. CMAs hold titles such as Controller and CFO across industries.

== Journal ==
IMA publishes the quarterly academic journal Management Accounting Quarterly, focusing on corporate accounting and financial management. IMA also publishes the magazine Strategic Finance, a publication focused on practices and trends in finance and accounting.

== See also ==
- Certified Management Accountant
