= Government Polytechnic, Karwar =

Government Polytechnic Karwar
- Karwar
- Motto: Providing good technical education to rural areas students.
- Type: Govt Aided Polytechnic
- Established: 1958
- Affiliations: Affiliated to Board of Technical Education & Govt of Karnataka.
- Location: Karwar, Karnataka, India
- Nickname: GPK

Government Polytechnic Karwar (GPK) is a polytechnic college in Uttara Kannada district of Karnataka, India. Situated just a mile away from Karwar. The college is affiliated to Board of Technical Education, Recognized by Government of Karnataka. It is also approved by All India Council for Technical Education AICTE, New Delhi.

== About The College ==
Government Polytechnic Karwar (GPK) established in 1958. The aims is to provide good technical education to rural area students.

The institution provides computer-based learning programs to meet the current needs of industry and business. The college is equipped with Cafeteria, Mess and Hostel facility along with College Library.

== Courses ==
Following are the courses in the college:

- Dip. in Automobile Engineering
- Dip. in Mechanical Engineering
- Dip. in Computer Science and Engineering
- Dip. in Electrical and Electronics Engineering
- Dip. in Civil Engineering.
- Dip. in Commercial Practice (Kan & Eng)
