= WIXQ =

- Millersville, Pennsylvania; United States
- Frequency: 91.7 MHz
- Branding: The Ville

Programming
- Format: Variety

Ownership
- Owner: Millersville University

History
- First air date: October 21, 1968
- Former call signs: WMSR (AM)

Technical information
- Licensing authority: FCC
- Facility ID: 42651
- Class: A
- ERP: 100 watts
- HAAT: 15 meters (49 ft)
- Transmitter coordinates: 40°00′3.53″N 76°21′38.74″W

Links
- Public license information: Public file; LMS
- Website: www.917theville.com

WIXQ (91.7 FM, "The Ville") is a non-commercial college radio station owned by Millersville University and licensed to serve Millersville, Pennsylvania. The station is staffed by students as an extra-curricular activity. Studios are located on campus in the Student Memorial Center.

== History ==
The Federal Communications Commission granted Millersville State College a construction permit for a new Class D 10 watt FM radio station on October 5, 1976. The station's studios were to be located in the Student Memorial Center and the transmitter was to be located on top of the Ganser Library Building. The station was assigned the WIXQ call sign on December 20, 1976 and was granted its first license on January 25, 1978.

On November 14, 1980, the FCC granted the college a construction permit to increase the station's effective radiated power (ERP) to 129 watts. On March 12, 1982, the FCC granted a new license with the updated facilities.

Former logo

On April 25, 2011, Millersville University filed a Notification of Suspension of Operations form with the FCC indicating that WIXQ would "go silent" on May 7, 2011. The reason given was due to major construction of the Ganser Building, which would result in the station losing its transmitter site. The filing indicated that the station's antenna would be permanently moving to the Jefferson Building [on the school's campus]. On August 29, 2011, Millersville University filed a Resumption of Operations form with the FCC. The station resumed broadcasting at noon that day. The FCC granted a new license with the updated facilities on August 31, 2011.

During the Spring 2012 semester, Station Advisor Dr. Ralph "Doc Roc" Anttonen announced his intentions to retire from the University following the Fall 2012 semester, ending his advisement of the station after 37 years. In December 2012, Assistant Professor Dr. Lowery Woodall was named new Station Advisor of WIXQ.

On October 13, 2018, WIXQ celebrated the 50th Anniversary of the station, along with its previous history as WMSR (AM) during Millersville University's homecoming weekend. The Anniversary was celebrated with a reunion in the University's Student Memorial Center, the release of 50 Years of Organized Chaos: A WIXQ Memoir... written by former station advisor, Dr. Ralph "Doc Roc" Anttonen, and the airing of Alumni testimonials throughout the 2018-2019 school year.

On September 17, 2019, WIXQ held its first WIXQ Day event, celebrating the history of the radio station and members of the Millersville and Lancaster communities. The all-day celebration featured a local records store sale, a karaoke fundraiser benefiting local music awareness, and on-air interviews with local musicians and community personnel, including Millersville University President Dr. Daniel A. Wubah and then Mayor of Millersville Borough, Richard Moriarty; proclaiming September 17 as "WIXQ Day" in the borough of Millersville.

At the end of the Spring 2022 semester, Lowery Woodall announced his resignation as advisor for WIXQ. Music Business professor Dr. Dain Estes would be named Station Advisor that Fall.

On October 21, 2022, longtime advisor Dr. Ralph "Doc Roc" Anttonen died aged 82. Millersville University President Dr. Daniel A Wubah released a statement following his passing, saying "Very few people in Millersville University's history have touched as many people as Dr. Ralph Anttonen, affectionately known as Doc Roc." A public celebration of life was held on November 5, 2022 at Millersville University's Pucillo Gymnasium.

On May 6th, 2024, Millersville University’s administrators entered into a 5-year contract with WITF, a radio station from nearby Harrisburg, PA to supply ‘NPR, PBS, and WITF programming’ to the station at no cost, despite protests from student DJs and staff going unreported. This broadcast-time donation cut 20 hours from the student program grid during prime drive-time hours (6-8am & 4-6pm) to distribute remote broadcasting via the Millersville University transmitter. This contract is set to expire on May 6th, 2029, though re-signing is possible.

== Signal note ==
WIXQ is short-spaced to WJAZ (licensed to serve Summerdale, Pennsylvania) as they operate on the same channel and the distance between the stations' transmitters is only 40 miles (64 km) as determined by FCC rules. The minimum distance between two Class A stations operating on the same channel according to current FCC rules is 71 miles (114 km). WJAZ uses a directional antenna to reduce its signal toward the southeast, in the direction of WIXQ.
