= GPKism =

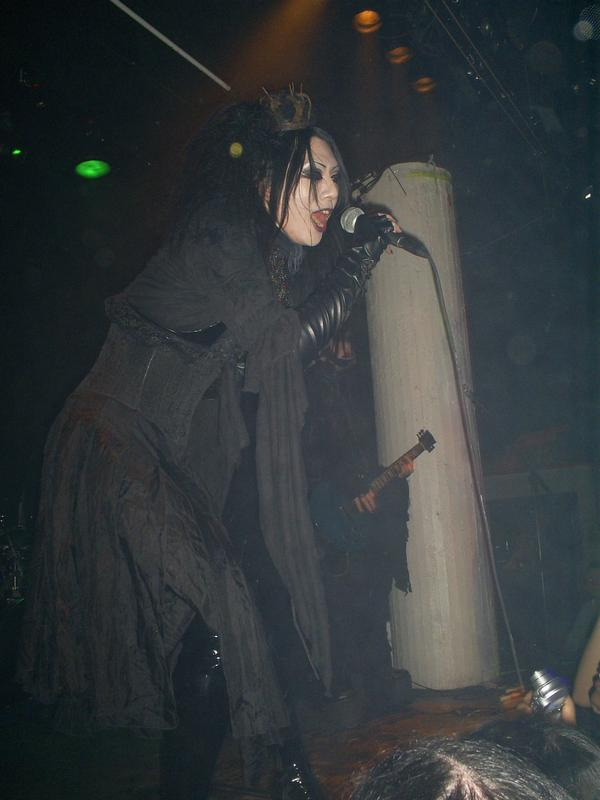
- GPKism playing live in New York City

Background information
- Origin: Australia/Japan
- Genres: EBM, darkwave, gothic rock
- Years active: 2007-2011
- Labels: Darkest Labyrinth
- Members: GPK; Kiwamu
- Website: Official site

GPKism (typeset as GPKISM) was a gothic/industrial music group formed in 2007. It was originally the solo project of GPK (Gothique Prince Ken), while Kiwamu (of Blood) joined later that year. Both GPK and Kiwamu compose music for this project. They were featured in several publications including Cure Magazine and they have toured Australia, Japan, the United States, Europe and Central America.

== History ==
GPKism was formed in January 2007 as the solo project of Australian musician GPK, and in September, guitarist Kiwamu of the Japanese goth band Blood joined the project, which was announced on the Internet Radio Show Tainted Reality. In January 2008, the same month that they released their first EP Sublimis, they were featured in Cure Magazine.

The band played their first live show on April 13, 2008 in Japan. In June they went on to play three shows in Australia, that were accompanied by in-store events.

Their first single, "Illuminatum," was released in September, 2008. This was followed a month later by their "Lament of the Fallen Star Tour" which included shows in Japan, Mexico, Costa Rica and in the United States at Nekocon. In December of that year, they played two live shows, opening for Suicide Ali. GPKism returned to Mexico and the United States to accompany Blood on their final tour.

GPKism's first full-length album, Atheos, was released on March 4, 2009 with the concept "Lament of a Fallen Angel". This was followed in March and April by a multi-city tour of Japan and Australia; their Australian tour also had Aural Vampire and DJ SiSeN performing. GPKism also toured Europe for the first time for their "Holy Blood" tour which included dates in Germany, Austria, Italy & Poland in May 2009.

On July 12 GPKism contributed a cover of RINK for the Blam Honey album Providence of Decadence and also performed alongside them at the Live Inn Rosa, Kiwamu and ex-BLOOD keyboardist RYO also helped arrange several tracks on the album.

The band released their EP Barathrum in August and a released a PV for it, gaining over 10,000 hits on YouTube under a month. This was the first release using the theme Countess Elizabeth Bathory. In September they toured South America and several of the Conventions there. After returning they released the EP Iudicium under the same theme.

In 2010 GPKism returned to the United States on tour with Seileen.

In late 2011 GPK returned to his own solo project Gothique Prince Ken while Kiwamu resumed activities with Blood.

They no longer appear to be active as a collaboration.

== Members ==
- Gothique Prince Ken (GPK) – vocals
- Kiwamu – guitar

Support members

- Ryonai – keyboard (Blam Honey and Suppurate System)

== Discography ==
Albums

- Atheos (March 4, 2009)
- Atheos 2nd Press (October 28, 2009)
- Reliquia (June 15, 2011)

EPs

- Sublimis (January 9, 2008)
- Barathrum (August 26, 2009)
- Iudicium (November 25, 2009)
- Sanguis Rosa (September 22, 2010)

Singles

- "Illuminatum" (September 17, 2008)
