= Razors on Backstreet =

Studio album by Aural Vampire
- Released: December 7, 2013 (Japan); March 7, 2014 (Worldwide)
- Recorded: 2011–2013
- Genre: Darkwave, synthpop, gothic rock
- Length: 50:00
- Label: Yottabyte Records
- Producer: Raveman

Aural Vampire chronology
Kerguelen Vortex EP (2011)	Razors on Backstreet (2013)	Mimic Your Hairstyle (2014)

Singles from Razors on Backstreet
- 1. "Soloween" Released: October 10, 2012

Stylized as RAZORS ON BACKSTREET, the third studio album by Japanese Darkwave band Aural Vampire was released December 7, 2013 in Japan and internationally on March 7, 2014.

== Overview ==
=== Musical style ===
The album features a much heavier, rock-influenced style of music. The album is the first to feature new band members; Wu-Chy on bass, Higuchuuhei on guitar, Zen on keyboard, and Izu on drums. Previous releases (with the exception of "Soloween") featured only lead-vocalist Exo-Chika and producer Raveman.

=== Artwork and theme ===
The album has an 1980s horror theme. Both the cover and title of the album are an allusion to the 1984 American horror slasher film, A Nightmare on Elm Street. This is the band's first album cover to not feature lead-singer Exo-Chika, instead it features only their producer, Raveman.

== Track listing ==
No.	Title	Length
1.	"Main Theme (メインテーマ, Mein Tēma)"	1:18
2.	"Carpe Noctem (カルペノクテム, Karupe Nokutemu)"	3:43
3.	"MAILER-DEMON"	4:36
4.	"Kerguelen Vortex (ケルゲレンボルテックス, Kerugeren Borutekkusu)" (Album Version)	4:59
5.	"Bad Taste Youth"	3:49
6.	"NO-SEE-UM"	3:47
7.	"Yama no Ox Bakery (山のオックスベーカリー, Yama no Okkusu Bēkarī; Hill's Ox Bakery)"	3:13
8.	"BIG BUG HUNTER"	0:52
9.	"Sex to Gang to Children (セックスとギャングとチルドレン, Sekkusu to Gyangu to Chirudoren; Sex and Gang and Children)"	3:53
10.	"Mukuromantic (ムクロマンティック, Mukuromantikku)"	5:50
11.	"FRAGILE"	3:43
12.	"Soloween (ソロウィン, Sorouin)"	4:26
13.	"Robinson (ロビンソン)"	5:51
Total length:		50:00

== Personnel ==
- Exo-Chika – vocals
- Raveman – production, lyrics
- Wu-Chy – bass
- Higuchuuhei – guitar
- Zen – keyboard
- Izu – drums
