= Blam Honey =

Japanese rock band

- Origin: Japan
- Genres: Industrial rock, electro-industrial, dark ambient
- Years active: 1995–2001, 2008-2010
- Labels: Explosion Works; Nippon Crown; Darkest Labyrinth
- Past members: Tatsuya; Hyuga; Ryonai

Blam Honey was an industrial rock band, formed in 1995 with two members: Tatsuya and Ryonai. Their sound has been described as "Industrial with a Gothic Sense". They list Nine Inch Nails, Marilyn Manson and Skinny Puppy as influences.

== History ==
Blam Honey released two albums: Grandiose Delusion (1998) and Typical Ingeniousness: Suggest (1999). They then disbanded due to both having health problems.

Ryonai started a side project, Suppurate System, and has been creating ambient music and Gothic Lolita fashion accessories that have gained popularity by several prominent visual kei artists.

Tatsuya died of acute leukemia in 2004, though Ryōnai did not release this information until four years later.

As of 2008, Ryonai has confirmed that Blam Honey has resumed activities. A revival performance and memorial CD release took place July 12, 2009. A new vocalist was chosen and debuted at Darkest Fest 2010. The new vocalist was Hyuga; however he left two months later with Ryonai filling in on vocals. With the shutdown of the official website and no new material since 2010, activity has seemingly ceased.

== Members ==
Ex-Members

- Ryōnai (programming, drums, percussion)
- Tatsuya (阿部 龍博, Abe Tatsuhiro) (lead vocals, guitar, bass, percussion)
- Hyuga (lead vocals, guitar, bass)

== Discography ==
=== Demos ===
- The Horse Breaker of Electronic Brain - (1995) [limited to 100 copies]
- The Horse Breaker of Electronic Angel - (1995) [limited to 200 copies]

=== Singles ===
- The Other Side of Electronic Brain - (1998) [limited to 1000 copies]
- Artificial Delusion - (June 22, 1998)

=== Album ===
- Grandiose Delusion - (February 9, 1998)
- Typical Ingeniousness: Suggest - (August 25, 1999)
- Providence of Decadence (August 26, 2009)

=== Video ===
- Industrial Gender Unit Blam Honey [limited to 500 copies]

== Trivia ==
- Ryōnai has suffered from myasthenia gravis. The band made a song entitled "Myasthenia" on their Typical Ingeniousness: Suggest album.
