= Resource consumption accounting =

Management accounting theory

Resource Consumption Accounting (RCA) is a management theory describing a dynamic, integrated, and comprehensive management accounting approach that provides managers with decision support information for enterprise optimization. RCA is a relatively new management accounting approach based largely on the German management accounting approach Grenzplankostenrechnung (GPK) and also allows for the use of activity-based drivers.

== Background ==
RCA emerged as a management accounting approach beginning around 2000, and was subsequently developed at CAM-I (The Consortium of Advanced Management, International) in a Cost Management Section RCA interest group commencing in December 2001. Over the next seven years RCA was refined and validated through practical case studies, industry journal publications, and other research papers.

In 2008, a group of interested academics and practitioners established the RCA Institute to introduce Resource Consumption Accounting to the marketplace and raise the standard of management accounting knowledge by encouraging disciplined practices.

By July 2009, Professional Accountants in Business (PAIB) Committee of International Federation of Accountants (IFAC), recognized Resource Consumption Accounting in the International Good Practice Guidance (IGPG) publication called Evaluating and Improving Costing in Organizations and its companion document, Evaluating the Costing Journey: A Costing Levels Continuum Maturity Model. The guide focuses on universal costing principles and with the Costing Levels Maturity Model acknowledges RCA attains a higher level of accuracy and visibility compared to activity based costing for managerial accounting information when the incremental benefits of RCA's better information exceed the incremental administrative effort and cost to collect, calculate and report its information.

As stated in the International Good Practice Guidance,

"A sophisticated approach at the upper levels of the continuum of costing techniques provides the ability to derive costs directly from operational resource data, or to isolate and measure unused capacity costs. For example, in the resource consumption accounting approach, resources and their costs are considered as foundational to robust cost modeling and managerial decision support, because an organization’s costs and revenues are all a function of the resources and the individual capacities that produce them."

— International Federation of Accountants, 2009

Resource Consumption Accounting was also recognized in a Sustainability Framework Report issued by the International Federation of Accountants (IFAC), for having the capability of helping organizations "improve their understanding of environmental (and social) costs through their costing systems and models". This Sustainability Framework highlights RCA under the sub-heading Improving Information Flows to Support Decision and informs readers that proper cost allocation can be built ‘directly into the cost accounting system’, thereby enhancing an organization's performance for "identifying, defining and classifying costs in a useful way".

== Concepts of Resource Consumption Accounting ==
RCA concepts that distinguish it from other management accounting approaches include the following:

1. Germany’s GPK method of quantity-based operational modeling using fixed and proportional costs established at the resource level in a company (i.e., cost center/resource pools or value streams");
2. Gordon Shillinglaw’s concept of attributable cost;
3. Flexible use of activity-based drivers (only where needed) based on specific, and restrictive rules;
4. Value chain integration of management accounting into operational systems;
5. Use of fundamental operations transactions as the primary source for financial and quantitative data (rather than the general ledger);
6. Replacing the principle of variability with the principle of responsiveness for operational modeling;
7. Support for a multi-level, contribution margin-based profit & loss statement that supports managerial decision-making without the cost distortions and complexity of inappropriate (not based on the principle of causality) allocations of cost.

== The core elements of RCA ==
There are three core elements that enable RCA to lay a very different foundation for its cost model.

- The view of resources – resources and their costs are considered foundational to proper cost modeling and decision support. An organization’s cost and revenues are all a function of the resources that produce them.
- Quantity-based modeling – the entire model is constructed using operational quantities. Operational data is the foundation of value creation and the leading indicator of economic outcomes.
- Cost behavior – value is added as a veneer to the quantity-based model and costs/dollars behavior is determined by the behavior of resource quantities as they are applied to value creating operations within an organization.

== Additional information ==
The goals of the RCA Institute, in promoting the acquisition of knowledge and skills to apply RCA, include the following:

- Improve management accounting knowledge and practice by clarifying and embracing sound principles that will enhance enterprise decision making and the public welfare through optimum resource usage.
- Advance the knowledge and practice of Resource Consumption Accounting (RCA) through:
  - A community of active, high quality practitioners and academics.
  - Consistent and disciplined practice centered on a core body of RCA knowledge that is not diluted by wide variations in use or form.
  - Education of adopters, practitioners and vendors and the certification of vendors’ products and services.
  - Increased adoption of RCA, over the long-term, as the dominant management accounting approach in business, government, and non-profit organizations.

The RCA Institute library contains an annotated bibliography that is currently divided into four sections:

1. RCA theory,
2. management accounting landscape and management accounting philosophy,
3. RCA related research and
4. other materials.

This annotated bibliography provides more information for recommended reading and some guidance on how to get the most out of the information that is there.
