= RCA International Division =

Former overseas division of RCA

The RCA International Division was the division of the Radio Corporation of America responsible for its foreign sales and business interests. Its activities included the sale of products to civilian consumers, television and radio broadcasters, governments, and commercial entities.

== Formation ==
RCA established the International Division in February 1945 to supervise foreign sales and the activities of its businesses outside the United States. John G. MacKenty, previously vice president and general manager of the Radiomarine Corporation of America, was appointed managing director. The division's formation was announced by RCA president David Sarnoff, with headquarters in New York.

The new organization consolidated existing overseas sales operations. It retained RCA Victor's international distributor network and incorporated the foreign sales of marine radio equipment previously handled separately by Radiomarine.

By 1954, RCA reported that the division operated through more than 200 major distributors and eleven associated companies, with headquarters at 30 Rockefeller Plaza. The associated businesses manufactured or assembled radios, television receivers, records and communications equipment. The International Division was organizationally distinct from RCA Communications, Inc., which operated international telecommunications services.

== Leadership ==
By October 1946, Meade Brunet was serving as RCA vice president and managing director of the International Division. He remained identified with those positions in RCA's 1954 corporate handbook.

Edmund A. Laport served as the division's chief engineer. His work included overseas construction projects and consultation with governments on broadcasting, communications, aviation and maritime systems. In 1954, he moved into corporate-level broadcast engineering responsibilities at RCA.

H.C. Edgar headed the division's operations, overseeing distribution and sales. In 1949, he was appointed merchandising director. In February 1954, he was appointed director of export, a newly created position. In August 1956, he served as director of consumer products marketing before becoming director of overseas procurement. In March 1958, Edgar was appointed to the newly created position of manager of distribution and sales, overseeing the division's sales organization, distribution activities and geographic markets through regional managers.

Clifford W. Slaybaugh served as RCA's worldwide broadcast sales manager during the 1940s and early 1950s. His customers included leading Cuban broadcasters and other Latin American broadcasting organizations.

== Projects ==
=== Turkish maritime communications ===
In October 1946, RCA announced an agreement with the Turkish government to install radio communications equipment aboard 31 merchant ships, construct a coastal marine radio station and supply equipment for a maritime radio training school. The International Division concluded the contract, with equipment supplied by Radiomarine. Brunet announced the agreement on October 23.

=== Cuba radio and television development ===
In July 1949, led by H.C. Edgar, the division supplied three complete radio broadcast transmitters to Unión Radio in Cuba through Humara y Lastra, RCA's Cuban distributor. The equipment comprised one 10,000-watt transmitter and two 1,000-watt transmitters, with a combined shipping weight of approximately 25,000 pounds. Edgar announced that the shipment had been transported by air on July 28.

RCA also supplied equipment for the introduction of Cuban television. CMQ, which obtained a television license in 1949, began ordering RCA television equipment later that year. CMQ commenced television programming on December 18, 1950, with its formal inauguration following on March 12, 1951. These television purchases were separate from the 1949 Unión Radio transmitter shipment.

=== Trans-Arabian Pipeline ===
Beginning in 1947, RCA International Division engineers provided communications for the construction of the Trans-Arabian Pipeline, commonly known as Tapline. Led by H.C. Edgar, RCA designed and installed a system connecting terminals and pumping stations. An initial telephone and teletype circuit linked the project's Beirut headquarters with Ras el Mishaab on the Persian Gulf. Additional radio services supported construction camps, survey parties, vehicles and aircraft.

In a January 1952 account, H.C. Edgar reported that the network had carried more than 500,000 telegrams and 750,000 telephone messages before oil began flowing in November 1950. His article also described the training of Saudi employees in telephone, radio, and instrument maintenance, standardization of spare parts, and the transfer of some RCA engineers into permanent Tapline employment.

The communications network subsequently supported the coordination of pipeline operations. Tapline's Radio and Dispatch office in Beirut relayed instructions through the radio room at the Zahrani terminal to regulate pumping and oil movements.

RCA personnel continued installation and repair work along Tapline in 1958, as documented in the correspondence of technician William W. Myers, who worked from Qaisumah in Saudi Arabia.

=== Manufacturing ===
By 1956, RCA's international business combined direct exports, overseas manufacturing and patent licensing. Albert F. Watters, an RCA vice president, served as the division's operations manager. Associated companies manufactured television receivers, electron tubes and records, while laboratories in Tokyo and Zurich provided technical support to licensees. RCA also arranged record manufacturing and distribution agreements with London Decca and associated companies for Britain, West Germany and Switzerland.

Communications projects included radiotelephone links across Colombia's Andes connecting Bogotá with Medellín and Cali, and a radio-relay network linking the Dominican Republic's major cities. In March 1956, Cuba inaugurated the first link of a planned 100-link RCA microwave system, connecting Campo Batista with Ciudad Militar. RCA also contracted to equip Henrique Ascanio's television station in Maracaibo, Venezuela.

=== Liberia telecommunications project ===
RCA secured a $2.86 million contract from Liberia to provide domestic long-distance telephone links and international telephone and telegraph connections, with completion scheduled for March 1964. The project included a microwave backbone, communications for Monrovia harbor, aviation and maritime facilities, and a shortwave broadcasting station. RCA Victor's Canadian operation was to supply approximately half the equipment, materials and services. The agreement also provided for training Liberians in North American RCA factories and during installation.

== Later reorganization ==
In 1967, RCA adopted a new approach to international marketing and manufacturing, assigning each major division worldwide responsibility for its products and services. A corporate staff function coordinated international activities. In 1968, RCA established a distribution center in Hong Kong and opened RCA House in London as an administrative and marketing headquarters for Europe, the Middle East and Africa.
