= Grenzplankostenrechnung =

German costing methodology

Grenzplankostenrechnung (GPK) is a German costing methodology, developed in the late 1940s and 1950s, designed to provide a consistent and accurate application of how managerial costs are calculated and assigned to a product or service. The term Grenzplankostenrechnung, often referred to as GPK, has been translated as either Marginal Planned Cost Accounting or Flexible Analytic Cost Planning and Accounting.

The GPK methodology has become the standard for cost accounting in Germany as a "result of the modern, strong controlling culture in German corporations". German firms that use GPK methodology include Deutsche Telekom, Daimler AG, Porsche AG, Deutsche Bank, and Deutsche Post (German Post Office). These companies have integrated their costing information systems based on ERP (Enterprise Resource Planning) software (e.g., SAP) and they tend to reside in industries with highly complex processes. However, GPK is not exclusive to highly complex organizations; GPK is also applied to less complex businesses.

GPK's objective is to provide meaningful insight and analysis of accounting information that benefits internal users, such as controllers, project managers, plant managers, versus other traditional costing systems that primarily focus on analyzing the firm's profitability from an external reporting perspective complying with financial standards (i.e., IFRS/FASB), and/or regulatory bodies' demands such as the Securities and Exchange Commission (SEC) or the Internal Revenue Services (IRS) taxation agency. Thus, the GPK marginal system unites and addresses the needs of both financial and managerial accounting functionality and costing requirements.

Resource Consumption Accounting (RCA) is based, among others, on key principles of German managerial accounting that are found in GPK.

== Background ==
The origins of GPK are credited to Hans-Georg Plaut, an automotive engineer and Wolfgang Kilger, an academic, working towards the mutual goal of identifying and delivering a sustained methodology designed to correct and enhance cost accounting information. Plaut concentrated on the practical elements of GPK, while Kilger provided the academic discipline and GPK documentation that is still being published in cost accounting textbooks taught in German-speaking universities. The primary textbook on GPK is Flexible Plankostenrechnung und Deckungsbeitragsrechnung.

In 1946, Plaut founded an independent consulting business in Hannover, Germany which continued to grow employing more than 2,000 consultants. Plaut and Kilger focused on creating a cost accounting system that would cater to managers who are responsible for controlling costs, managing profits and providing information that would enable managers to make informed decisions.

== Concepts of GPK ==
GPK is a marginal costing system and is decidedly more comprehensive than most U.S. cost management systems because of the level of organizational planning and control and its emphasis on accurate operational modeling.

With GPK's marginal-based approach, internal service and saleable product/service costs should only reflect the direct and indirect costs that can be linked to individual outputs (whether final product or support service) on a causal basis (referred to as the principle of causality). Proportional costs in GPK consists of direct and indirect costs that will vary with the particular output. Proportional costs provide the first contribution margin level that supports short-term decisions and once proportional costs are subtracted from revenue, it reveals whether the product or service is profitable or not. GPK adopters' marginal practices have varied, for example, not all adopters adhere to strict marginal practices such as the pre-allocation of fixed costs based on planned product/service volumes.

Fixed costs, innately do not vary with outputs and usually are not associated with individual outputs' costs. However, in practice, GPK adopters often calculate a standard per-unit-rate for fixed product/service costs and a separate per-unit-rate for proportional product/service costs. The balance of costs not causally assignable to the lowest level product or service can be assigned at yet higher levels within the marginal costing system's multi-level Profit & Loss (P&L) statement. For example, with GPK, fixed costs that relate to a product group or a product line (e.g., R&D, advertising costs) are assigned to the product group or product line reporting/management dimension in the P&L. This marginal costing approach offers managers greater flexibility to view, analyze and monitor costs (e.g., all product and cost-to-serve costs) for their area of responsibility. Thus GPK assigns all costs to the P&L but it does not fully absorb to the lowest level product or service. GPK's multi-dimensional marginal view of the organization supports operational managers with the most relevant information for strategic decision-making purposes about "what products or services to offer" and at "what price to sell them".

== Core elements of GPK ==
According to German Professors Dr.'s Friedl, Kuepper and Pedell, the fundamental structure of GPK consists of four important elements:

1. Cost-type accounting,
2. Cost center accounting,
3. Product[service] cost accounting, and
4. Contribution margin accounting for profitability analysis.
- Cost-type accounting separates costs like labor, materials, and depreciation, followed by each cost account then being broken down into fixed and proportional costs along with the assignment of these cost accounts to cost centers.
- Cost center accounting is the most important element in GPK. A cost center can be defined as an area of responsibility that is assigned to a manager who is held accountable for its performance. It is common to have from 200 to over 2,000 cost centers in a typical GPK adopter organization.

GPK distinguishes two types of cost centers:

- Primary Cost Centers - are cost centers that provide output directly consumed by a saleable product or service is considered to be a primary cost center. related to the service or manufacturing process.
- Secondary Cost Centers - are cost centers that incur costs but exist to support the functions of the primary cost centers. Typical secondary cost centers include: information technology (IT) services and; human resources (HR) areas that offer hiring and training functions.

With the GPK marginal costing approach, primary cost centers outputs consumed by products/services reflect direct causal relationships, as well as causally-linked costs originating from supporting secondary cost centers that primary cost centers need to function. As such, both of these causally-linked outputs—if proportional in nature—will vary with product/service output volume (albeit the secondaries only indirectly) and are reflected in the appropriate product/service contribution margin in the P&L.

- Product/Service cost accounting also referred to as Product Costing, is where all of the assigned costs that are product related will be collected in the GPK costing model. In GPK's purest marginal form only proportional costs are assigned to products or services, but as indicated above a compromise is often struck by also assigning product-related fixed costs.
- Profitability management is the final component that completes the marginal costing system by adding in the revenues, cost-to-serve and common fixed costs along with the product/service cost accounting information discussed above. (Refer to the Exhibit below for a graphic depiction of cost flows in GPK.) The GPK structure allows for a more detailed analysis because of the multi-dimensional contribution margin view. This type of multi-level profitability management not only supports short-term decision making such as pricing decisions or internal pricing transfers, but it also provides relevant costing information for long-term decisions.

== GPK marginal costing diagram ==
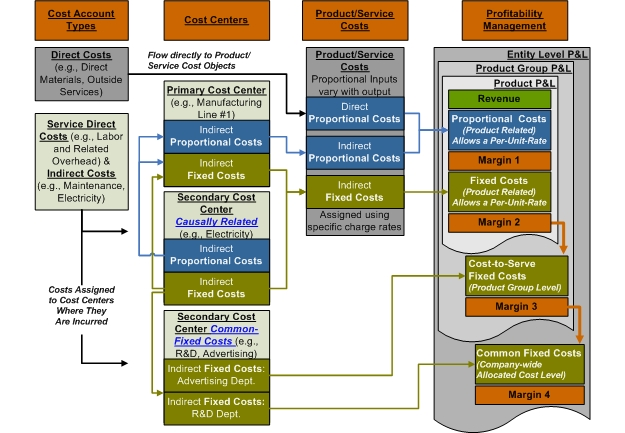
