= Punainen jättiläinen =

Finnish publisher of manga and manhwa

Punainen jättiläinen ("Red giant") is a Finnish small publisher of Japanese manga and Korean manhwa. It was founded in April 2005 by its CEO, Antti Grönlund. However, the publisher was acquired by Tammi in 2009. Nowadays, Punainen jättiläinen works together with Sangatsu Manga under facilities of Tammi publishing company.

Punainen jättiläinen is known from their typically large-format, bookstore-oriented releases. The only exceptions this far are Azumanga Daioh and Yotsuba&!, which are in small-format and sold at magazine stands, as is typical for manga published in Finland.

== Releases ==
- Ragnarök (June 2005)
- Les Bijoux (January 2006)
- Kill Me, Kiss Me (April 2006)
- Princess Ai (June 2006)
- Gunnm (November 2006)
- Azumanga Daioh (August 2007)
- Hideyuki Kikuchi's Vampire Hunter D (November 2007)
- Yotsuba&! (April 2008)
- Karin (September 2009)
- Black Lagoon (October 2009)
- Princess Princess (December 2009)
- Eerie Queerie! (May 2010)
- Ginga Nagareboshi Gin (May 2010)
- Ghost! (May 2010)
- La Esperanca (November 2010)
- Chrono Crusade (January 2011)
- Wolf's Rain (March 2011)
- Planetes (April 2011)
- K-On! (July 2011)
- Suzunari! (October 2011)
- S.S. Astro (December 2011)
- Ginga Densetsu Weed (December 2011)
- Basilisk (December 2011)
- Nichijou (January 2012)
- Vampire Knight (March 2012)
- Kuroshitsuji (July 2012)
- Kill Me Baby (October 2012)
- A Bride's Story (July 2014)
- Ginga Densetsu Akame (June 2016)
- Ginga Densetsu Weed: Orion (November 2016)
- Ginga: The Last Wars (May 2019)
- One Punch Man (August 2020)
- Ginga Densetsu Noah (April 2021)
- Isabella Bird in Wonderland (2023)
- Parasyte (March 2025)
