= Demon Flowers =

Japanese manga series

- Cover of the first Japanese volume of Demon Flowers

狂い咲きの花 (Kuruizaki no Hana)
- Genre: Horror, boys' love
- Manga
- Written by: Hakase Mizuki
- Published by: Shinshokan
- English publisher: NA: Tokyopop
- Magazine: Wings
- Original run: May 2004 – November 2006
- Volumes: 5

Demon Flowers (Japanese: 狂い咲きの花, Hepburn: Kuruizaki no Hana) is a horror manga with boys' Love themes by Hakase Mizuki. Long ago, when Japanese Gods descended upon humans, their mixed offspring inherited supernatural powers...and the name "Kuruizaki no Hana."Now, those of the Demon world are rising up to wipe out these offspring—led by the cool and confident assassin, Ushitora. He's worshipped as a deadly professional, but when he falls in love with one such gifted boy, Masato, everything changes. Ushitora betrays his people, instead sacrificing himself to a life on the run, in order to care for Masato and a spirited orphaned girl named Nao. From Mizuki Hakase, creator of The Demon Ororon series, comes a dark, chaotic drama about three lost souls in search of the true meaning of family.

Four volumes of the story are published in English by Tokyopop.

== Summary ==
Demon Flowers is about a demon named Ushitora, a boy named Masato who is a half-breed offspring of a human and a god (or 'Kuruizaki no Hana'), and an orphan girl named Nao who all live together. Demons usually hunt down Kuruizaki no Hana to consume their flesh and gain their power, which is what Ushitora is doing at the start of the manga. An expert assassin, Ushitora is sent to kill a young girl Kuruizaki no Hana. After killing her Ushitora discovers she has a younger brother, Masato Hiradaira. Touched by the boys naive kindness and realizing he does not want to kill the child, Ushitora informs the other assassins that he is leaving for good and takes the young boy with him. Ushitora continues to live on the run with Masato, who, in the current plot, is fifteen years old. When Masato was twelve, Ushitora also brought home a young girl named Nao. They all live together as of the first volume, moving every few months to evade their demon pursuers, but Masato and Nao are unaware of this. (Masato appears to have erased his sisters murder from memory). Eventually, the three are tracked down by the 'Family', Ushitora's old demon partners. Masato and Nao are kidnapped by the leader, Gold, and Ushitora later turns up at Gold's mansion to save them. Later on in the second volume, Ushitora reveals strong feelings for Masato. Masato admits that he knew Ushitora killed his sister, but does not blame him for it.

== Terminology ==
Kuruizaki no Hana: {As written in the first volume} "Demons devoured the gods that once guarded Japan and kept it safe. By consuming the flesh of the gods, the demons assimilated their powers. The demons have discovered that some of the gods bore human children with special powers. The demons are looking for these children...to consume them...to take their powers. They call these children 'Kuruizaki no Hana — Flowers Out Of Season'"

The Family: A name given to an organization of assassins in which Ushitora Ishikawa was a part of before leaving and taking Masato Hiradaira with him. Botan and Inugama (Inugami) are also a part of the 'Family', and serve under the leader Gold, who is also Ushitora's father. Leaving the 'Family' without permission requires punishment, which is death.

== Characters ==
Ushitora Ishikawa: Ushitora was the Assassin of the 'Family' of demons he lived and worked with. After killing a Kuruizaki no Hana girl, he discovers her 4-year-old brother and realises that he does not want to kill the child. He takes the boy and leaves the Family, effectively being branded a betrayer. Tall, blond and handsome (described as "a beautiful person" in the first volume), Ushitora appears to excel at almost everything he does (e.g. assassination, chess, cooking and even cross-dressing). He's laid-back, cocky but also quiet and contemplative. He is very direct when he speaks but has his fair share of secrets. According to him, his mother died when he was a child, has an older brother he describes as 'mellow' and a father he describes as 'trash'. He cares deeply for Nao and Masato and home schools them. In volume 2, he confesses that he is in love with Masato, but when Masato tells him he loves him too, Ushitora tells him that it is a different type of love and that he 'wants to make love' to Masato, though when asked if he likes men he says that he is not gay and likes women but Masato is different. Masato returns these feelings despite what Ushitora says. In volume 3 he is shown to wield a weapon called The Scythe of Death, which causes the killed victims body to rot.

Masato Hiradaira: A Kuruizaki no Hana boy with the power to heal injuries (but not his own) and mend things such as broken glass. He was taken in by Ushitora after he assassinated his sister, but Masato does not remember this, only remembering from after he started living with Ushitora at 4 years old and has been for 11 years, making him 15 in volume 1. He has nightmares about the night his sister died. He has blond hair like Ushitora and green eyes. He is a very talented piano player, the only thing he is better at than Ushitora. He is the cheerful joker of the little family (Nao states in volume 1 that when Masato is quiet the whole house becomes quiet).

Nao Imai: A little girl that Ushitora found crying in the rain after her teacher hit her. He offered to take her away from the orphanage and she has lived with Ushitora and Masato ever since for 5 years. In volume 1 she is one week away from her 12th birthday. She has pink voluminous hair and dark pink/red eyes. She is cheeky, spunky, and a bit of a tomboy but she also loves wearing pretty dresses and playing with dolls. She loves her family, Ushitora and Masato. Masato says that "though she may look tough but actually she hates to be alone and worries about things all the time."

Himeko: A round, fluffy creature that strongly resembles a rabbit (or perhaps is merely an odd-looking rabbit). She is 1 year and 2 months old in volume 1, likes to eat rare flowers and is the pet of the three.

Kareha Yamamoto: Introduced in the 3rd volume. Wears glasses and appears to think of himself as a ladies man. For some unknown reason he is looking for Ushitora and Masato along with Onibi, but he seems more interested in the fact that Masato is alive. Later, it is revealed that he is actually Masato's father and later dies in volume 4 to save Masato.

Noko-Chan: A female spirit. She helps Kareha and Onibi because she is in love with Kareha who doesn't return her feelings and still loves his dead Goddess wife.

Onibi: Introduced in the 3rd volume, he is shown on the cover as having red hair. Onibi and Ushitora are said to be old friends, and he is aware that Ushitora is in trouble with Gold and so is going to save him. He himself states that Kareha and himself just happened to meet and he also doesn't know why Kareha is searching with him.

== The Family ==
Gold: Leader and commander of the "Family". He is a powerful demon, and is the father of Ushitora and Kagerou. He is cruel, cold-hearted, and tends to enjoy killing. His workers call him "Master Gold" and would do anything for him, including dying or suicide. It is revealed in volume 3 that Gold killed his wife when she tried to leave with another man. Gold is killed by Ushitora in volume 3.

Kagerou: Ushitora's brother. He kidnapped Nao while the other demons went after Masato. He is only following his father's orders very reluctantly and apologizes to Nao saying he "couldn't stop this ridiculous farce". Even though he took Nao in the first place he is careful not to let any more harm befall her, proving he is a good person. In volume 3 he is shown to wield the Hyakki Sword, a sword made from the bones of 100 demons. He is killed by a demon after he falters to strike down Gold, who was using Nao as a shield.

Botan: Ushitora'ss former subordinate. She was never going to admit it, but when Ushitora told her he was leaving the 'Family' she admitted that she loved him and broke down when he left. She is very polite in her speech, always referring to Ushitora as 'Ushitora-sama'. She is revealed to be dead in volume 3.

Inugama (Inugami in the English version): Ushitora's former subordinate. Before Ushitora leaves the 'Family' he tells him he had great respect for Ushitora because he was always kind to those of lower rank. He is the one that kidnaps Masato and has a strange scar on the left side of his face, which he didn't have when Ushitora left years ago. It is implied the 'Family' disfigured him for letting Ushitora leave. Inugama is in love with Botan. In volume 3, as he talks to Botan's skeleton, he reveals that he is the one who took her life. He also reveals that she 'never looked at him' after Ushitora left, even when he made love to her so that she 'wouldn't be lonely' he knew she was thinking of Ushitora.

== Update ==
- The fifth volume of Demon Flowers was set to be released April 7, 2009. It still hasn't become available.
- TokyoPop has officially dropped Demon Flowers, despite that there was only one more book to release. It will no longer be published in a full tankōbon.
- Buy.com has this book available for preorder with a release date of July 30, 2011.
