= List of RG Veda chapters =

The first volume of the original Japanese release RG Veda as published by Shinshokan in February 1990 in Japan.

The chapters of the Japanese manga series RG Veda were written and illustrated by Clamp and serialized in Shinshokan's monthly manga magazine Wings. The story of the manga features elements of Vedic mythology; the title itself imitates Rigveda, the name of one of the four Vedas.

The individual chapters were later collected into ten tankōbon volumes by Shinshokan and published between 1990 and 1996. The series has been licensed for an English-language release in North America and the United Kingdom by Tokyopop.

== Volume list ==
No.	Original release date	Original ISBN	English release date	English ISBN
01	February 10, 1990	978-4-403-61218-3	April 12, 2005	978-1-59532-484-9
"The Resurrection of Ashura" (阿修羅復活篇, "Ashura Fukkatsu Hen" (lit. Resurrection of Ashura Chapter)); "曐(HOSHI) 祭(MATSURI): Star Festival" (曐祭, "HOSHI MATSURI" (lit. Star Festival)); "非/天/の/炎/天/主/の/雷: Flame of Destruction, Thunder of the King" (非/天/の/炎/天/主/の/雷, "Hi/ten/no/Honoo/Ten/sha/no/Ikazuchi" (lit. Flame of the Negative Heaven, Thunder of the Heavenly Lord)); "道(TOMO)灯(SHIBI)" (道灯, "TOMO SHIBI" (lit. Guiding Light)); "RG Veda Bonus Manga" (聖伝のみなさんのおかげです, "Seiden no Mina-san no Okage desu") (lit. RG Veda - Thanks to Everyone); "CLAMP Newspaper Pirated Edition RG Veda by Mick Nekoi" (CLAMP新聞海賊版聖伝1 猫井みっく, "Kuranpu Shinbun Kaizokuban Seiden 1 - Nekoi Mikku" (lit. CLAMP Newspaper Pirated Edition RG Veda 1 - Mick Nekoi))
02	July 10, 1990	978-4-403-61230-5	July 12, 2005	1-59532-485-2
"Storm of the Six Stars Part I" (六星群嵐篇I, "Rokuseigun Arashi Hen Ichi" (lit. Storm of the Six Stars Chapter I)); "RG Veda Bonus Manga" (聖伝の誰かがやらねば, "Seiden no Dare ka ga Yaraneba") (lit. RG Veda - Who Can Do It?); "CLAMP Newspaper Pirated Edition RG Veda by Mick Nekoi" (CLAMP新聞海賊版聖伝2 猫井みっく, "Kuranpu Shinbun Kaizokuban Seiden 2 - Nekoi Mikku" (lit. CLAMP Newspaper Pirated Edition RG Veda 2 - Mick Nekoi))
03	December 25, 1990	978-4-403-61244-2	October 11, 2005	1-59532-486-0
"Storm of the Six Stars Part II" (六星群嵐篇II, "Rokuseigun Arashi Hen Ni" (lit. Storm of the Six Stars Chapter II)); "RG Veda Bonus Manga" (聖伝のガキの使いやあらへんで, "Seiden no Gaki no Tsukai ya Arahende" (lit. RG Veda - This Is No Job For Kids)); "RG Veda Bonus Manga 2" (やまだかつてない聖伝, "Yamada Katsutenai Seiden") (lit. Never Seen Before RG Veda); — (CLAMP新聞海賊版聖伝3 猫井みっく, "Kuranpu Shinbun Kaizokuban Seiden 3 - Nekoi Mikku" (lit. CLAMP Newspaper Pirated Edition RG Veda 3 - Mick Nekoi))
04	September 25, 1991	978-4-403-61265-7	January 10, 2006	1-59532-487-9
"Ice Castle Amidst the Flames of Hell" (水城炎獄篇, "Suijō Engoku Hen" (lit. Water Palace, Fire Prison Chapter)); "RG Veda Bonus Manga" (聖伝のおかあさんといっしょ, "Seiden no Okā-san to Issho") (lit. RG Veda - Together With Mother); — (CLAMP新聞海賊版聖伝4 猫井みっく, "Kuranpu Shinbun Kaizokuban Seiden 4 - Nekoi Mikku" (lit. CLAMP Newspaper Pirated Edition RG Veda 4 - Mick Nekoi))
05	March 25, 1992	978-4-403-61276-3	April 11, 2006	1-59532-488-7
"Sky Queen, Fly Away" (蒼王飛翔篇, "Sōō Hishō Hen" (lit. Flight of the Azure Queen Chapter)); "Memories: 追(Bonus)想(Chapter)" (追想, "Tsuisō" (lit. Reminiscence)); "RG Veda Bonus Manga" (聖伝のひらけ!ポンキッキ, "Seiden no Hirake! Ponkikki") (lit. RG Veda - Open! Ponkikki); — (CLAMP新聞海賊版聖伝5 猫井みっく, "Kuranpu Shinbun Kaizokuban Seiden 5 - Nekoi Mikku" (lit. CLAMP Newspaper Pirated Edition RG Veda 5 - Mick Nekoi))
06	December 25, 1992	978-4-403-61295-4	July 11, 2006	1-59532-489-5
"Battle of Wolves" (牙狼争覇篇, "Garō Sōha Hen" (lit. Battle of the Fanged Wolf Chapter)); "RG Veda Bonus Manga" (聖伝の新婚さんいらっしゃい, "Seiden no Shinkon-san Irasshai") (lit. RG Veda - Welcome, newlyweds!); — (CLAMP新聞海賊版聖伝6 猫井みっく, "Kuranpu Shinbun Kaizokuban Seiden 6 - Nekoi Mikku" (lit. CLAMP Newspaper Pirated Edition RG Veda 6 - Mick Nekoi))
07	June 10, 1993	978-4-403-61312-8	October 10, 2006	1-59532-490-9
"A War Against Destiny I" (非天征戮篇I, "Hiten Seiriku Hen Ichi" (lit. Purging of the Negative Heaven Chapter I)); "A Dark Star's Nightmare" (非天夢魔, "Hitenmuma" (lit. Nightmare of the Negative Heaven)); "RG Veda Bonus Manga" (聖伝のおしえて！ えらい人っ, "Seiden no Oshiete! Erai Hito") (lit. RG Veda - Tell Me! Famous People); "CLAMP Newspaper Pirated Edition RG Veda by Tsubaki Nekoi" (CLAMP新聞海賊版聖伝7 猫井みっく, "Kuranpu Shinbun Kaizokuban Seiden 7 - Nekoi Mikku" (lit. CLAMP Newspaper Pirated Edition RG Veda 7 - Mick Nekoi))
08	June 25, 1994	978-4-403-61350-0	January 9, 2007	978-1-59532-491-7
"A War Against Destiny II" (非天征戮篇II, "Hiten Seiriku Hen Ni" (lit. Purging of the Negative Heaven Chapter II)); "往(The)世(Past)" (往世, "Ōse" (lit. Rendezvous)); "RG Veda Bonus Manga" (聖伝の異論反論おぶじぇくしょん, "Seiden no Iron Hanron Obujekushon") (lit. RG Veda - Objection, Objection, Objection); "CLAMP Newspaper Pirated Edition RG Veda 8 by Tsubaki Nekoi" (CLAMP新聞海賊版聖伝8 猫井みっく, "Kuranpu Shinbun Kaizokuban Seiden 8 - Nekoi Mikku" (lit. CLAMP Newspaper Pirated Edition RG Veda 8 - Mick Nekoi))
09	July 15, 1995	978-4-403-61387-6	April 10, 2007	1-59532-492-5
"Twin Castles in Flames and Thunder I" (双城炎雷篇I, "Sōjō Enrai Hen Ichi" (lit. Twin Castle Flaming Thunder Chapter I)); "CLAMP Newspaper Pirated Edition RG Veda 9 by Tsubaki Nekoi" (CLAMP新聞海賊版聖伝9 猫井みっく, "Kuranpu Shinbun Kaizokuban Rigu Vēda 9 - Nekoi Mikku" (lit. CLAMP Newspaper Pirated Edition RG Veda 9 - Mick Nekoi))
10	May 15, 1996	978-4-403-61416-3	September 11, 2007	1-59532-493-3
"Twin Castles in Flames and Thunder II" (双城炎雷篇II, "Sōjō Enrai Hen Ni" (lit. Twin Castle Flaming Thunder Chapter II))
