= Weiß Kreuz =

Japanese media franchise

- Cover of the first DVD of Knight Hunters: Weiß Kreuz

ヴァイス·クロイツ (Vaisu Kuroitsu)
- Created by: Takehito Koyasu; Project Weiß
- Light novel

Forever White
- Written by: Kenichi Kanemaki
- Illustrated by: Kyōko Tsuchiya
- Published by: Tokuma Shoten
- Magazine: Animage
- Original run: July 1997 – December 1997
- Volumes: 1
- Manga

Weiß: An Assassin And White Shaman
- Written by: Takehito Koyasu
- Illustrated by: Kyōko Tsuchiya
- Published by: Shinshokan
- Magazine: Wings
- Original run: 1997 – 1998
- Volumes: 2
- Anime television series

Knight Hunters: Weiß Kreuz
- Directed by: Kiyoshi Egami (#1–15); Kazunori Tanahashi (#16–25)
- Produced by: Kazuhiko Inomata; Kōichi Kikuchi; Tetsuya Watanabe
- Written by: Isao Shizuya
- Music by: Norimasa Yamanaka
- Studio: Animate Film; Magic Bus (#1–15); Plum (#16–25)
- Licensed by: NA: Media Blasters (2001-present)
- Original network: TV Tokyo
- Original run: April 8, 1998 – September 30, 1998
- Episodes: 25
- Original video animation

Weiß Kreuz Verbrechen & Strafe
- Directed by: Shinichiro Kimura
- Produced by: Shinobu Tomioka; Kōichi Kikuchi; Kōji Yoritsune
- Written by: Toshimichi Ōkawa
- Music by: Norimasa Yamanaka
- Studio: Triangle Staff
- Released: November 25, 1999 - February 23, 2000
- Episodes: 2
- Anime television series

Weiß Kreuz Glühen
- Directed by: Hitoyuki Matsui
- Produced by: Kenta Nishikawaji; Hikaru Kondō
- Written by: Kazuharu Sato; Ryunosuke Kingetsu
- Music by: Motoi Sakuraba
- Studio: Ufotable
- Licensed by: NA: Media Blasters (2004-present)
- Original network: Kids Station
- Original run: November 28, 2002 – February 20, 2003
- Episodes: 13
- Manga

Weiß: Side B
- Written by: Takehito Koyasu
- Illustrated by: Shoko Ohmine
- Published by: Ichijinsha
- Magazine: Monthly Comic Zero Sum (#1–21); Comic Zero Sum Zōkan Ward (#22–37)
- Original run: January 2003 – August 2007
- Volumes: 5

Weiß Kreuz (Japanese: ヴァイスクロイツ, Hepburn: Vaisu Kuroitsu; literally German for "White Cross", written "Weißes Kreuz" or "Weißkreuz" in German) is a series conceptualized by voice actor Takehito Koyasu about four assassins that work in a flower shop called "Kitty in the House". The assassins are members of a group called Weiß (white), which is run by Persia of the mysterious Kritiker organization.

The Weiß Kreuz franchise includes two seasons of anime and one OVA series, a light novel, two manga series, and several drama CDs. The four voice actors of the main characters – Koyasu, Hiro Yūki, Shin-ichiro Miki, Tomokazu Seki – formed a band named "Weiß"; several CDs and singles were released. Media Blasters released the anime in the North America as Knight Hunters: Weiß Kreuz.

== Plot ==
Four young men consisting of Omi Tsukiyono, Ken Hidaka, Youji Kudou, and Aya Fujimiya, are members of a group of assassins called "Weiß". They cover their operations by working at a flower shop during the day and solving crimes and fighting villains during the night. This is no ordinary group: they kill murderers, big corrupt businessmen, and other assassins and criminals that the law cannot touch. Each one is fighting for their own reasons, whether it is for revenge or to help the people that they care about. But they soon realize that there are connections between some of their cases and try to find out what is really going on behind the scenes. They use whatever they can to complete their missions and kill the people that are targeted by Weiß's mysterious leader known as Persia.

== Characters ==
=== Weiß ===
An assassin group that is under the order of Kritiker ("critic" in German), a secret organization that falls under the Japanese police force.

Ran Fujimiya (藤宮 蘭, Fujimiya Ran)
Codename: Abyssinian
Voiced by: Takehito Koyasu (Japanese); Paul Juhn (Kapitel), Dan Green (Gluhen) (English)
He is known as Aya (アヤ), the name that belongs to his sister who is in a coma. His parents were killed and his sister was run over by Reiji Takatori, causing him to join Weiß seeking revenge. Aya's weapon is a katana named "Shion" after the previous owner and Aya's teacher. Before Aya became Weiß, he was a member of Sendai Kritiker, Tsushima Kritiker and Tokyo Crashers. Aya's car is a white Porsche 928.
Omi Tsukiyono (月夜野 臣, Tsukiyono Omi)
Codename: Bombay (Weiß Kreuz), Persia (Weiß Kreuz Glühen)
Voiced by: Hiro Yūki (Japanese); Jamie McGonnigal (English)
Due to his computer skills, Omi (オミ, Omi) is in charge of gathering information and planning Weiß's missions. He uses a crossbow, bow and poisoned darts as his weapons. Omi was kidnapped when he was eleven, and as his father refused to pay ransom, he was saved by Persia who trained him for a killer. Omi lost his memories due to shock and doesn't remember his life before Kritiker at the start of the series, but as the action unfolds he discovers he is in fact Mamoru Takatori (鷹取衛, Takatori Mamoru), son of Reiji Takatori - head of the Takatori family, who are in some way related to almost all the missions the boys have to take. Later, in the Dramatic Precious drama CDs, he finds out that he is really Shuichi Takatori's biological son. He assumes the position "Persia" in Glühen.
Ken Hidaka (飛鷹 健, Hidaka Ken)
Codename: Siberian
Voiced by: Tomokazu Seki (Japanese); Brian Morey (English)
Ken (ケン) was once a talented professional soccer goalie in the J-League, but he was forced to quit due to a gambling scandal, despite the fact that he was completely innocent. Before he became one of Weiß, Ken was a member of Kagoshima Kritiker and underwent a mission on Yakushima Island.
Youji Kudou (工藤 耀爾, Kudō Yōji)
Codename: Balinese
Voiced by: Shin-ichiro Miki (Japanese); Marc Diraison (English)
Youji (ヨージ, Yōji) is a ladies' man and a former private detective. It is that he once ran a Private Investigator Agency with his first love, a young woman with sunglasses and a distinctive beauty mark named Asuka Murase. Asuka, however, was shot and killed while investigating the members-only Liott club, which hides a prostitution ring. He joined Weiß to protect all the other women of the world because he couldn't protect his love and partner, and this explains his insensitive-seeming practice of only accepting missions that have to do with women of legal age. Previously a member of Kobe Kritiker.

=== Kritiker ===
Persia (ペルシャ, Perusha)
Voiced by: Jūrōta Kosugi (Japanese); Christopher Yates (English)
The head officer of the police force by day and head of Kritiker, an underground organization fighting for justice, by night. His real name is Shuuichi Takatori (修鷹取, Shū Takatori) and he is Reiji Takatori's brother and Omi's biological father (with Reiji's wife; that is the reason why Reiji did not pay the ransom for Omi when he was kidnapped). Persia's codename for Kritiker is "Marigold", and "King" for Crashers.
Manx (マンクス, Mankusu)
Voiced by: Mami Horikoshi (Japanese); Sue Gilad (English)
Persia's red-headed secretary, whom Yoji always flirts with but never gets anywhere with. She has feelings for Shuichi Takatori, but does not act on them due to their professional relationship and his remaining love for his brother's late wife. Manx is a cold and calculating woman who doesn't let the personal feelings of Weiß members influence her decisions. She uses the codename "Erika" when dealing with the non-lethal Kritiker teams. Her real name is Hanae Kitada (花枝北田).

Birman (バーマン, Baman)
Voiced by: Kikuko Inoue
In the early CD drama Birman is shown serving as a liaison between Weiß and Persia, along with Manx. In the anime she is introduced after Shuichi Takatori's death, as a private secretary of the new Persia, Yoshirou Karasuma. Like Manx for Shuichi, Birman also has feelings for the man she serves.
Botan (牡丹, Botan)
Voiced by: Fumihiko Tachiki
A Kritiker agent who assists Birman in guiding Weiß, and takes a particular interest in Aya due to his own personal reasons for joining the organization. He later dies in episode 17 from being shot, put on fire, and thus burned to death. His codename means "peony".
Yoshirou Karasuma (烏丸善郎, Karasuma Yoshirou)
Voiced by: Tōru Ōkawa
Takes the position of Persia after Shuichi Takatori.

=== Civilians ===
Aya Fujimiya (藤宮 彩, Fujimiya Aya)
Voiced by: Yui Horie (Japanese); Rachael Lillis (English)
The younger sister of Ran who was run over by the car of Reiji Takatori on her sixteenth birthday. She has been comatose ever since. Despite the fact that she is now eighteen years old, her body has not physically aged at all. As a result, she becomes a target of Schwarz. Aya is commonly referred to as Aya-chan to differentiate her from her older brother.
Sakura Tomoe (巴 さくら, Tomoe Sakura)
Voiced by: Hiroko Kasahara (Japanese); Katie Adams (English)
A girl with a striking resemblance to Aya's younger sister. She becomes quite close to Aya, who pushes her away because he fears she will be in danger if she comes to know him, and somewhat because her resemblance to his sister brings him pain. She uses her physical resemblance to Aya's sister in order to protect Aya-chan from Schwarz later on. In the Dramatic Precious drama CDs she eventually goes abroad to study in Paris, France, acknowledging her feelings for Aya have been fading.
Ouka Sakaki (榊 凰華, Sakaki Ōka)
Voiced by: Minato Ayase (Japanese); Alissa Gordon (English)
A frequent patron of the flower shop, Ouka is a privileged schoolgirl who is especially fond of Omi. Unfortunately for both of them, she is also Reiji Takatori's illegitimate daughter, which results in her being caught up in Weiß's struggles against Schwarz and the Takatori family; the consequences, described in both the anime and the CD dramas, are especially gruesome; in the anime, she is accidentally killed by Schwarz, and in the Dramatic Precious drama CDs it is revealed that her body, along with her older brothers', has been preserved.
Ms. Momoe (百恵さん, Momoe-san)
Voiced by: Rachael Lillis
The kindly owner of The House of Kittens, the flower shop where the members of Weiß work. Her lazy white cat always sleeps on her lap, occasionally looking up when interesting things happen in the shop. Generally, however, neither Ms. Momoe nor the cat see any action. Her full name is Momoe Yamaguchi (百恵山口).

=== Enemies ===
==== Schwarz ====
The main enemies in the series are another group of assassins called Schwarz ("Black" in German), all of whom have supernatural powers. Schwarz begrudgingly work as bodyguards for the Takatori family, and this is how they meet Weiß. Later in the series, Schwarz is seen assisting a mysterious group known as "Eszett" (the name of the German alphabetic character ß) in resurrecting their deceased leader. Weiß is to Kritiker what Schwarz is to Eszett.

Brad Crawford (ブラッド·クロフォード, Buraddo Kurofōdo)
Voiced by: Ryoutarou Okiayu (Japanese); Michael Tremain (English)
Crawford is the leader of Schwarz. Though Crawford seems to follow commands without so much as a question, he is not someone to be trusted. He is very focused, although what drives him is unknown. Crawford has the ability to see bits and pieces of the future. Because of this, he has shown to be quite difficult to deal with on more than one occasion. He is 27 in the first anime.
Schuldig (シュルディッヒ, Shurudihhi)
Voiced by: Hikaru Midorikawa (Japanese); Jeff Swarthout (English)
Both sadistic and masochistic to an extent, Schuldig enjoys messing with people's heads, which is all too easy given his power of telepathy. He claims that people's minds taste like honey; however, he also complains that at times he can't tell which thoughts are his. Schuldig means "guilty" in German and Dutch. He is 22 in the first anime.
Nagi Naoe (直江 那岐, Naoe Nagi)
Voiced by: Nozomu Sasaki (Japanese); Chris Fuller (English)
Nagi was shunned as a child by the people around him because of his telekinetic powers. He was living on the streets for quite a long time, then taken in by a nurse who led an orphanage. Due to the fact that the nurse actually was using the children living in the orphanage to commit crimes, Weiss was ordered to kill the nurse. Ken, who knew a girl from the orphanage and thereby got to know Nagi as well, was the one to kill the nurse. Nagi witnessed the murder and as a result he made the church collapse by using his telekinetic powers - and from there on hated Ken in specific. He ran off and found shelter at Crawfords, who then took him in. Then he started to work with and for Schwarz to get revenge on both Ken and the world for the way everybody treated him when he was a child. He is very solemn and embittered towards the world. He is 15 in the first anime.
Farfarello (ファルファレロ, Farufarero)
Voiced by: Ryuusei Nakao (Japanese); Rick Mann (English)
Called demented by most, his multitude of scars and ability to grin at insane acts of violence toward others and himself makes this accusation seem true. His real name is Jei. When he learned as a child that his real mother was Ruth, the nun who had been his teacher, Jei snapped and murdered his adoptive parents and sister, then blocked out the memory, developing a vendetta against God and Christians. In the Dramatic Image albums III and IV, he and Schwarz meets a young woman named Sally Schumars while on the run. She is a timid witch who is trying to escape from Rosenkreuz, a group of people with special gifts similar to Schwarz's, and Schwarz has a complicated history with the Rosenkreuz organization. Farfarello and Sally fall in love, one of the main reasons being given is that she makes him feel again. At the end of the fourth Dramatic Image album, he and Sally part from Schwarz with Schwarz's sort of "blessing." Farfarello's name comes from one of the demons in Dante's Inferno. He is 20 in the first anime.

==== Schreient ====
A group of four female assassins employed and cared for by the scientist Masafumi Takatori. They are fiercely loyal to him and one another. "Schreiend" is the German word for "screaming."

Hell (ヘル, Heru)
Voiced by: Masako Katsuki (Japanese); Stacey Williams (English)
She is the leader of Schreient, carrying out her lover's will. She was once a member of the Japanese Self Defense Force. She is normally level-headed, but can be moved to great anger. Hell means "bright" in German, and her real name is Chizuru Aoi.
Schön (シェーン, Shēn)
Voiced by: Miki Itou
She was once a model, and has more than a healthy appreciation for her own beauty: it is a scratch to the face that angers her the most in one battle. While she seems very self-absorbed, she does not put herself before the rest of Schreient. Schön means "beautiful" in German, and her real name is Karen Kitaura.
Neu (ノイ, Noi)
Voiced by: Kotono Mitsuishi (Japanese); Kaitlin O'Neal (English)
A strike to her face in one battle breaks her visor and reveals to Yoji the eyes of someone he believed dead: his ex-lover and partner, Asuka. The anime never conclusively states whether she is or is not, but it is confirmed in the All That Weiß official artbook that Neu indeed is Asuka. After Youji lost her, she was forced into prostitution, then sold as a guinea pig to Kourin. In episode sixteen, she uses the name "Kyoko" when she tries to seduce (and then kill) Yoji. Neu means "new" in German.
Tot (トート, Tōto)
Voiced by: Yuko Mizutani (Japanese); Rachael Lillis (English)
This seventeen-year-old girl acts much, much younger than she is, talking to her stuffed rabbit and referring to herself in third person, although a definitive reason is never given. It is implied that she was abused by her father, as she says that he was a "very bad man," and that Schreient actually rescued her from him. She is involved in a short, sweet love affair with Schwarz's Nagi before her apparent death at the hands of Farfarello. It is revealed in episode twenty-five that Nagi was able to save her from death, using his telekinetic powers to re-start her stopped heart. Tot means "dead" in German, and her real name is Nanami Kyouno.

==== The Takatori Family ====
A family that seems to be involved in all the crimes Weiß deal with.

Reiji Takatori (鷹取 玲司, Takatori Reiji)
Voiced by: Norio Wakamoto (Japanese); Mike Pollock (English)
The head of the family. Once thought to be Omi's father. He killed Aya's parents to cover up the fact that he'd been embezzling from the bank where Aya's father worked, leaving Mr. Fujimiya to take the blame, and ran Aya-chan down with his limousine when she escaped the explosion he had set off in their home to cover his crime.
Hirofumi Takatori (鷹取 弘史, Takatori Hirofumi)
Voiced by: Masaki Aizawa (Japanese); Patrick Lanczki (English)
Reiji's eldest son, the one who reveals to Omi who he truly is. Hirofumi supports Reiji's ambitions and carries favor with potential political allies by doing things like staging hunts where they can chase down and kill human prey. In the flashbacks that Omi has, it is revealed that he was the kinder of Omi's two brothers, but was corrupted by his father.
Masafumi Takatori (鷹取 雅史, Takatori Masafumi)
Voiced by: Keiji Fujiwara (Japanese); Kevin T. Collins (English)
Reiji's second eldest son and the scientist who backs Schreient. Masafumi's goal is to create a chemical formula which will make him immortal and godlike, and to accomplish that goal he performs illegal experiments on unwilling victims. He seems to have a thing for pretty girls and boys, and at the beginning, he will only experiment on young children who are "pretty."

=== Others ===
==== Tokyo Crashers ====
The team Aya was on just before he became one of Weiß. Tokyo Crashers appear in Crashers: Knight and Ran I & II and Weiß Kreuz Glühen. Crashers is a non-lethal unit designed to supplement police activity.

Knight (ナイト, Naito)
Voiced by: Toshihiko Seki
His real name is Yuushi Honjou (優士本庄). His parents died in an accident during which his sister Taiyou (太陽) lost her sight. He carries a weapon called a cundledargeon.

Rook (ルーク, Rūku)
Voiced by: Hōchū Ōtsuka
His real name is Masato Tanuma (将人田沼). Aya was sent to replace him after Masato got wounded during a mission.
Bishop (ビショップ, Bishoppu)
Voiced by: Hideyuki Tanaka
His real name is Reiichi Shirasagi (黎一白鷺). The team's mission planner.
Pawn (ポーン, Pōn)
Voiced by: Kōichi Tōchika
His real name is Naru Uhyou (成雨氷). The team's explosives expert. He is seventeen in the drama CDs.
Queen (クイーン, Kuīn)
Voiced by: Eiko Masuyama
Serves as a liaison between Crashers and King.

== Media ==
=== Light novel ===
The cover of Weiß: "Forever White", which first appeared in the July 1997 issue of Animage

A light novel entitled Weiß: "Forever White" (ヴァイス 「Forever White」, Vaisu: "Forever White") was serialized from July 1997 to December 1997 in the anime and manga magazine Animage, published by Tokuma Shoten. It was written by Kenichi Kanemaki and illustrated by Kyoko Tsuchiya. It was put into a single book entitled White Hunters (白き匁人たち, Shiroki Kariudo-tachi).

=== Story ===
A short story entitled The Meeting can be found in the All That Weiß official artbook. It explains how the Weiß members met the first time. According to the official Weiß Kreuz chronologies, the version of how Weiß was formed from The Meeting is the one working with the series.

=== Manga ===
==== Weiß - An Assassin and White Shaman ====
Weiß - An Assassin and White Shaman, illustrated by Kyoko Tsuchiya and story by voice actor Takehito Koyasu, was serialized in the shōjo manga magazine Wings, published by Shinshokan. The chapters were collected into two tankōbon, and the first one includes thirty-two color pages, and the second one includes twenty color pages. It takes place before Forever White and explains how Aya first joined Weiß. Due to the differences between the manga version and the anime version of Aya's back story, Weiß - An Assassin and White Shaman is not a prequel to the anime. Weiß - An Assassin and White Shaman is published in German by Egmont Manga & Anime.

No.	Japanese release date	Japanese ISBN
1	January 1, 1998	978-4403660207
2	December 20, 1998	978-4403660214

==== Weiß Side B ====
Weiß Side B, illustrated by Shoko Ohmine, takes place after the events of Weiß Kreuz Glühen. It is published by Ichijinsha; the first twenty-one chapters were serialized in the monthly josei manga magazine Comic Zero Sum and chapters twenty-two through thirty-seven were serialized in the quarterly shōjo manga magazine Comic Zero Sum Zōkan Ward. Weiß Side B ended with the publication of chapter thirty-seven in the Summer 2007 issue of Comic Zero Sum Zōkan Ward. The last seven chapters have yet to be collected in tankōbon format. Weiß Side B is also published in German by Egmont Manga & Anime.

Initially, the series was supposed to end with Weiß Kreuz Glühen, as Aya died in the final episode, and Koyasu originally wanted Ohmine to do a manga adaptation of Weiß Kreuz Glühen, but then he decided it would be boring to tell the same story twice, so Weiß Side B ended up being a sequel and Aya was brought "back from hell."

No.	Japanese release date	Japanese ISBN
1	June 25, 2003	978-4758050388
#1: "Human Interleukin I" (ヒト・インターロイキンI, Hito Intāroikin Wan); #2: "Human Interleukin II" (ヒト・インターロイキンII, Hito Intāroikin Tsū); #3: "Remembrance" (追憶, Tsuioku); #4: "Placed in Hands Too Small" (小さすぎる手のひち, Chīsa Sugiru Te no Hichi)
2	November 2003	978-4758050524
#5: "For You I Would" (あなたのたぬに僕は, Anata no Tanu ni Boku wa); #6: "On a Day of Snow" (雪の日に, Yuki no Hi Ni); #7: "Life is a wheel of changes."; #8: "Someday, When your Name is Called" (いつか、君の名を呼ぶ日まで, Itsuka, Kimi no Na o Yobu bi made); #9: "As for the thinking "Justice"."
3	May 25, 2004	978-3770461479
#10: "The Strongest Combination" (最強のコンビネーション, Saikyō no Konbinēshon); #11: "A Mask of Raw Skin" (生皮の仮面, Namakawa no Kamen); #12: "Rusted wings"; #13: "Shame and Pride" (恥と誇り, Haji to Hokori); #14: "He's my Daisy"
4	January 25, 2005	978-4758051156
#15: "Experimental Body" (実験体, Jikken-tai); #16: "Moratorium of Memories" (記憶のモラトリアム, Kioku no Moratoriamu); #16.5: "STAND IN"; #17: "Football & Flowershop!"; #18: "Dead Star" (デッド・スター, Deddo Sutā); #19: "Memory is not for Compensation" (追憶はいのためでなく); #20: "Fallen Heroes" (堕ちた英雄, Ochita Eiyū); #21: "Human Interleukin" (ヒト・インターロイキン, Hito Intāroikin)
5	April 25, 2006	978-4758052153
#22: "Afterglow of Glory" (栄光の残照, Eikō no Zanshō); #23: "See what a nice bloke, they are!"; #24: "She's our girl!"; #25: "Choices" (選択肢, Sentakushi); #26: "If Everyone Takes It" (誰もがそれを手にするとレたら, Daremo ga Sore o Te ni Suru to Retara); #27: "Turning Your Back On The Unknown" (見ぬ先に背を向ける); #28: "Phantom Dance I"; #29: "Phantom Dance II"; #30: "Phantom Dance III"

=== Anime ===
==== Weiß Kreuz ====
Weiß Kreuz is the first of the Weiß anime series. It runs twenty-five episodes and follows Weiß in its mission to "defeat the dark beasts" that haunt Tokyo. The beginning episodes lend some back story to Aya, Ken, and Yoji, and show their motivations for being in Weiß. Omi's history becomes part of the storyline and is delved into halfway through. Weiß Kreuz introduces Kritiker, Schwarz, Eszett, and Schreient.

Weiß Kreuz uses the character designs created by Kyoko Tsuchiya, and features the lowest quality of animation of the three Weiß Kreuz anime series.

Because the last two episodes were aired as an hour-long special in Japan, this series is sometimes considered a 24-episode series. The Media Blasters' release has the episodes separate. Media Blasters released the series under the name Knight Hunters (which is TMS Entertainment's international title for the series), and Anime-Virtual kept the title unchanged for the German release.

No.	Title	Original release date
1	"Lockvogel - Sacred Banquet" "Lockvogel - Nie no Utage" (Lockvogel -贄の宴-)	April 8, 1998
.
2	"Fort Laufen - The Awakened Runaway" "Fort Laufen - Sameta Bōsō" (Fort Laufen -醒めた暴走-)	April 15, 1998
.
3	"Paradies - Heaven is Hell" "Paradies - Tengoku wa Jigoku" (Paradies -天国は地獄-)	April 22, 1998
.
4	"Verrat - Execution of Betrayal" "Verrat - Uragiri no Shokei" (Verrat -裏切りの処刑-)	April 29, 1998
.
5	"Schicksal - Fate of the Hunter" "Schicksal - Kariudo no unmei" (Schicksal -狩人の運命-)	May 6, 1998
.
6	"Fräulein - The Image of a Girl" "Fräulein - Omokage no Shōjo" (Fräulein -面影の少女-)	May 27, 1998
.
7	"Entführen - The Memories Return" "Entführen - Yomigaeru Kioku" (Entführen -甦る記憶-)	June 3, 1998
.
8	"Raubtier - Howls in the Night" "Raubtier - Dōkoku no Yoru" (Raubtier -慟哭の夜-)	June 10, 1998
.
9	"Schreient - Each One's Thoughts" "Schreient - Sorezore no Omoi" (Schreient -それぞれの思い-)	June 17, 1998
.
10	"Bruder - Bond of Darkness" "Bruder - Kuraki Kizuna" (Bruder -昏き絆-)	June 24, 1998
.
11	"Abkunft - Breaking from the Spells" "Abkunft - Jubaku kara no Ketsubetsu" (Abkunft -呪縛からの決別-)	July 1, 1998
.
12	"Abschied - Why..." "Abschied - Naze..." (Abschied -何故…-)	July 8, 1998
.
13	"Bruch - Rain of Revenge" "Bruch - Fukushū no Ame" (Bruch -復讐の雨-)	July 15, 1998
.
14	"Fliehen - Martial Law" "Fliehen - Shuto Kaigen" (Fliehen -首都戒厳-)	July 22, 1998
.
15	"Duell - Hunters of Revenge" "Duell - Gyakushū no Kariudo" (Duell -逆襲の狩人-)	July 29, 1998
.
16	"Schatten - Return to Battle" "Schatten - Tatakai e no Kaiki" (Schatten -戦いへの回帰-)	August 5, 1998
.
17	"Kritiker - Pride With No Name" "Kritiker - Namonaki Hokori" (Kritiker -名もなき誇り-)	August 12, 1998
.
18	"Schuld - Farfarello" "Schuld - Farufarero" (Schuld -ファルファレロ-)	August 19, 1998
.
19	"Sehen - Prelude to Insanity" "Sehen - Kyōsō no Jokyoku" (Sehen -狂想の序曲-)	August 26, 1998
.
20	"Recht - Arrow of Justice" "Recht - Sabaki no Ya" (Recht -裁きの矢-)	September 2, 1998
.
21	"Trane - Among Memories..." "Trane - Omoide no Naka de..." (Trane -思い出の中で…-)	September 9, 1998
.
22	"Miteid - Fading Time" "Miteid - Iroaseru Toki" (Miteid -色あせる時-)	September 16, 1998
.
23	"Schraube - Everything For Love" "Schraube - Ai ni Subete wo" (Schraube -愛にすべてを-)	September 23, 1998
.
24	"Zeremonie - The Portrait Which Passes Each Other" "Zeremonie - Surechigau Shōzō" (Zeremonie -すれ違う肖像-)	September 30, 1998
.
25	"Ende des Weiß - Those of White..." "Ende des Weiß - Shiroki-sha-tachi ni..." (Ende des Weiß -白き者たちに…-)	September 30, 1998
.

Openings
1. "Velvet Underworld"
  - April 8, 1998 - July 29, 1998
  - Lyricist: Takeshi Aida / Composer: Kazuya Nishioka / Arranger: Kazuya Nishioka / Singers: Weiß
  - Episode Range: 1-15
2. "Piece Of Heaven"
  - August 5, 1998 - September 30, 1998
  - Lyricist: Takeshi Aida / Composer: Kazuya Nishioka / Arranger: Kazuya Nishioka / Singers: Weiß
  - Episode Range: 16-25
Endings
1. "Beautiful Alone"
  - April 8, 1998 - July 29, 1998
  - Lyricist: Takeshi Aida / Composer: Kazuya Nishioka / Arranger: Kazuya Nishioka / Singers: Weiß
  - Episode Range: 1-15
2. "It's Too Late"
  - August 5, 1998 - September 30, 1998
  - Lyricist: Takeshi Aida / Composer: Kazuya Nishioka / Arranger: Kazuya Nishioka / Singers: Weiß
  - Episode Range: 16-25
Insert Songs
1. "Oh Mercy"
  - June 24, 1998
  - Lyricist: Asato Hibi / Composer: Kazuya Nishioka / Arranger: Kazuya Nishioka / Singers: Weiß
  - Episode Range: 10

==== Weiß Kreuz OVA: Verbrechen & Strafe ====
The second Weiß Kreuz series, Verbrechen & Strafe ("Crime & Punishment" in German), is a two-episode OVA that takes place a short time after the end of the anime, and before the events detailed in the last set of Drama CDs. In hiding, Aya, Ken, Yoji and Omi work out of a mobile home, using their flower-selling business as a cover. Their location is never specified, but it is possibly in the area of Yokota Air Base or Camp Zama, which are both American military bases near Tokyo. Their first mission involves a target by the name of Col. Nichol who evidently has his own enemies in a later target for Weiß and a young man named Akira. However, Ken and Omi decide to decline the mission to kill Akira after they hear Akira's (and his younger sister Kaori's) story. They only want revenge on Nichol for killing their parents several years before. Kaori was also a classmate of Omi's and the only surviving member of her group of friends, all supposedly killed by Nichol. Kritiker doesn't take to Ken and Omi's defection, and amends the mission. Yoji and Aya are instructed to target their teammates as well.

The OVA is notable because of the darker, bloodier storyline and the higher quality of animation compared to the first series.

==== Weiß Kreuz Glühen ====
The third DVD of the German release of Weiß Kreuz Glühen. The character designs were changed from the original Weiß Kreuz series due to copyright issues.

The third series, called Weiß Kreuz Glühen (ヴァイスクロイツグリーエン, Vuaisu Kuroitsu Gurīen; "White Cross Glow" in German) is a thirteen-episode series which is set after the OVA. Several of the original Weiß members are not immediately visible; two new ones are introduced in the first episode: namely Sena Izumi and Kyou Aguri. Also, Omi has assumed the position of Persia left by his father. Glühen takes place at Koua Academy, where Weiß are investigating a series of unusual suicides. The animation quality is far higher than the original series. However, the character design is vastly different due to legal disputes with the original character designer, Kyoko Tsuchiya. Schwarz also appears in Glühen; they also have changed appearances due to the lawsuit. Media Blasters released the series under the name Knight Hunters Eternity (which is TMS Entertainment's international title for the series), and Anime-Virtual kept the title unchanged for the German release.

No.	Title	Original release date
1	"WHITE FLAMES"	November 28, 2002
.
2	"God Hurts Those He Loves" "Kami wa Taisetsu na Mono o Kizutsukeru" (神は大切なものを傷つける)	December 5, 2002
.
3	"Sweet Nothing"	December 12, 2002
.
4	"Rhodesia"	December 19, 2002
.
5	"It's Too Late"	December 26, 2002
.
6	"No Reason"	January 5, 2003
.
7	"Jeepstar"	January 9, 2003
.
8	"Instant Karma"	January 16, 2003
.
9	"Mellow Candle"	January 23, 2003
.
10	"Velvet Underworld"	January 30, 2003
.
11	"Piece Of Heaven"	February 6, 2003
.
12	"Epitaph"	February 13, 2003
.
13	"Tomorrow"	February 20, 2003
.

Openings
1. "Gluhen"
  - November 28, 2002 - February 20, 2003
  - Lyricist: Takeshi Aida / Composer: Kazuya Nishioka / Arranger: Kazuya Nishioka / Singers: Weiß
  - Episode Range: 1-13
Endings
1. "Stone Roses"
  - November 28, 2002 - February 13, 2003
  - Lyricist: Takeshi Aida / Composer: Kazuya Nishioka / Arranger: Kazuya Nishioka / Singers: Weiß
  - Episode Range: 1-12
2. "Tomorrow"
  - February 20, 2003
  - Lyricist: Takeshi Aida / Composer: Kazuya Nishioka / Arranger: Kazuya Nishioka / Singers: Weiß
  - Episode Range: 13
Insert Songs
1. "Velvet Underworld 03"
  - January 30, 2003
  - Lyricist: Asato Hibi / Composer: Kazuya Nishioka / Arranger: Kazuya Nishioka / Singers: Weiß
  - Episode Range: 10

=== Drama CDs ===
A large number of Weiß Kreuz drama CDs have been released. All of them are a part of the official timeline. A few detail Aya's, Ken's and Omi's past with Kritiker. Some show Weiß's missions before and during the first anime. Others explain what happened between Verbrechen & Strafe and Weiß Kreuz Glühen. Weiß Kreuz Glühen Dramatic Soundtracks II takes place during Glühen.

==== List of Weiß Kreuz drama CDs ====
- Crashers: Knight and Ran I
- Crashers: Knight and Ran II
- Weiß Kreuz Dramatic Image Album I
- Weiß Kreuz Dramatic Image Album II
- Weiß Kreuz Dramatic Image Album III Schwarz Ein I
- Weiß Kreuz Dramatic Image Album IV Schwarz Zwei II
- Weiß Kreuz Dramatic Collection I The Holy Children
- Weiß Kreuz Dramatic Collection II ENDLESS RAIN
- Weiß Kreuz Dramatic Collection III Kaleidoscope Memory
- Weiß Kreuz Dramatic Precious 1st Stage SLEEPLESS NIGHT
- Weiß Kreuz Dramatic Precious 2nd Stage TEARLESS DOLLS
- Weiß Kreuz Dramatic Precious 3rd Stage HOPELESS ZONE
- Weiß Kreuz Dramatic Precious Final Stage DREAMLESS LIFE
- Weiß Kreuz Wish A Dream Collection I~Flower of Spring~
- Weiß Kreuz Wish A Dream Collection II~A four-leaf Clover~
- Weiß Kreuz Wish A Dream Collection III~THE ORCHID under THE SUN~
- Weiß Kreuz Wish A Dream Collection IV~FIRST MISSON~
- Weiß Kreuz Glühen I Fight Fire With Fire
- Weiß Kreuz Glühen II Theater Of Pain
- Weiß Kreuz Glühen Dramatic Soundtracks I
- Weiß Kreuz Glühen Dramatic Soundtracks II

== See also ==
- White Cross: The name "Weißkreuz" was the German name for a chemical warfare agent in World War I.
