= Baku (manga) =

Japanese manga series

- Cover of the Japanese volume of Baku

ばく
- Genre: Supernatural
- Manga
- Written by: Hakase Mizuki
- Published by: Shinshokan
- English publisher: NA: Tokyopop
- Magazine: Wings
- Published: 2003
- Volumes: 1

Baku (ばく) is a manga by Hakase Mizuki that was published in Wings and has been licensed by Tokyopop.

== Plot ==
Takeshi Uesugi knows he's not an ordinary sixteen-year-old boy. His mother thinks he's not human and it's driving her crazy. She can't be trusted not to abuse him, and lives in a mental institution. When Takeshi agrees to model for his father's friend, his face on billboards brings a lot of attention. Suddenly there are many people taking an interest in him, some with very unusual powers, just like Takeshi. He soon finds out that he is the reincarnation of the "Baku," a spirit that devours people's nightmares. Now he helps ghosts, demons, and other supernatural spirits while struggling to care for his own little family.

== Reception ==
"Baku is visually unique and has a story that flows like a dream or a nightmare. Fans who enjoy this strange style of manga will be glad to hear that the creator has many more titles under her belt, and Baku is a great place to start!" — Scott Campbell, activeAnime. "Fans of supernatural and gothic romance will find that this is the comic for them." — Leroy Douresseaux, Comic Book Bin. "All told, I can't really recommend Baku. Much of the material is a complete waste of time, and what remains is not really enough to justify a purchase." — Greg Hackmann, Mania. "Through it all, Hakase's technique brims with emotional expressiveness: the look in a character's eyes, the tilt of a mouth, or even just the curl of a line can say all that needs to be said—anger, sadness, peace, and everything in between." — Carlo Santos, Anime News Network. "Almost enjoyable, if you can get past the hero's tacky animal-print suit. That was just plain weird." — Sheridan Scott, Newtype USA. "Readers used to seeing a manga loaded with panels, side jokes, and an overabundance of writing crowding each page might find this book a little jarring, but there's a real beauty to it that ought to catch you off guard." — A. E. Sparrow, IGN.
