= Hyakushō Kizoku =

Japanese manga series

- First wideban volume cover

百姓貴族
- Genre: Autobiographical; Comedy; Slice of life
- Manga
- Written by: Hiromu Arakawa
- Published by: Shinshokan
- English publisher: NA: JManga (digital)
- Imprint: Wings Comics
- Magazine: Un Poco (2006–2009); Wings (2009–present)
- Original run: December 28, 2006 – present
- Volumes: 9
- Anime television series
- Directed by: Yūtarō Sawada
- Written by: Yūtarō Sawada
- Music by: Precious tone
- Studio: Pie in the sky
- Licensed by: Remow
- Original network: Tokyo MX, BS Asahi
- Original run: July 7, 2023 – present
- Episodes: 36 + 2 OVAs
- icon

Hyakushō Kizoku (百姓貴族; lit. 'The Noble Farmer') is a Japanese autobiographical manga series written and illustrated by Hiromu Arakawa. It was serialized in Shinshokan's manga magazine Un Poco from December 2006 to March 2009, when the magazine ceased its publication, and the series was then transferred to Wings in June of the same year. The series is infrequently published. Its chapters have been collected in nine wideban volumes as of April 2026. An anime television series adaptation was broadcast from July to September 2023. A second season aired from October to December 2024. A third season aired from October to December 2025. A fourth season has been announced.

== Plot ==
Hiromu Arakawa talks candidly about the life of dairy farmers in Hokkaido, as well as detailing her own personal experiences, childhood memories, and the current state of her family's farm.

== Characters ==
Hiromu Arakawa (荒川 弘, Arakawa Hiromu)
Voiced by: Mutsumi Tamura
The author herself. She explains the content of this work based on her personal experience on the family ranch, and uses her agricultural knowledge to tease Ishii.
Ishii (イシイ)
Voiced by: Mariko Honda
The editor in charge of this work. She is often teased by the author's agricultural knowledge and retorts that her knowledge is different from that of ordinary people.
Oyaji-dono (親父殿)
Voiced by: Shigeru Chiba
The author's father, and the owner of the family ranch. He has a casual personality and often performs all kinds of bizarre behaviors. He is very good at using or transforming agricultural facilities in unique ways to complete his unconstrained behaviors. Many times he escaped from danger in some accidents, and then the livestock in the family ranch would die for no reason, and the author believed that they became scapegoats.
Okan (おかん)
Voiced by: Kujira
The author's mother handled various housework at home and administrative work on the ranch, and she continued to work on the ranch even when she was pregnant, which the author admires very much.

== Media ==
=== Manga ===
Written and illustrated by Hiromu Arakawa, Hyakushō Kizoku started in Shinshokan's manga magazine Un Poco on December 28, 2006. Un Poco ceased its publication with its 17th issue, released on March 28, 2009, and the series was transferred to the publisher's magazine Wings on July 28, 2009. The series is published on an irregular basis. Shinshokan has collected its chapters into individual wideban volumes. The first volume was released on December 11, 2009. As of April 24, 2026, nine volumes have been released.

The manga was digitally published in English by JManga in 2012.

==== Volumes ====
No.	Japanese release date	Japanese ISBN
1	December 11, 2009	978-4-403-67085-5
2	February 25, 2012	978-4-403-67114-2
3	February 25, 2014	978-4-403-67153-1
4	February 25, 2016	978-4-403-67175-3
5	November 25, 2017	978-4-403-67177-7
6	November 22, 2019	978-4-403-67180-7
7	October 22, 2021	978-4-403-67183-8
8	December 20, 2023	978-4-403-67189-0
9	April 24, 2026	978-4-403-67195-1

=== Anime ===
In October 2022, it was announced that the series would receive an anime television series adaptation. The series was animated by Pie in the sky and directed and scripted by Yūtarō Sawada, with Aayne Matsumoto serving as character designer, animation director and animator, Ari in charge of backgrounds, and Minori Yamada credited for ending animation. The music was composed by Precious tone. The Japan Agriculture Group's Central Union of Agricultural Cooperatives is credited for supervising the agricultural aspects. The ending theme song is "Cyan Innocence" (シアン・イノセンス, Shian Inosensu), performed by FRAM. It was broadcast for 12 episodes on Tokyo MX and BS Asahi from July 7 to September 22, 2023. It consists of four-minute-long episodes. The episodes were collected on a DVD, along with two unaired episodes, and bundled with the eighth manga volume, released on December 20, 2023.

A second season was announced in December 2023. It aired from October 4 to December 20, 2024. The ending theme song is "Chōaizoku" (寵愛族), performed by Sanetii.

A third season was announced in December 2024. It aired from October 3 to December 19, 2025. The opening theme song is "Kage ni Nari Hinata ni Nari" (陰になり日向になり; 'Offer Help Both When Seen and Unseen'), performed by Pachae.

A fourth season was announced in December 2025.

The series has been streamed by Remow on the It's Anime YouTube channel.

== Reception ==
By December 2023, the manga had over 4.1 million copies in circulation. Hyakushō Kizoku was one of the Jury Recommended Works at the 16th Japan Media Arts Festival in 2012. The series ranked 42nd on the 2014 "Book of the Year" list from Media Factory's Da Vinci magazine, where professional book reviewers, bookstore employees, and Da Vinci readers participate; it ranked 30th on the 2016 list; and 36th on the 2020 list.
