= Dragon Fist (disambiguation) =

Dragon Fist is 1979 Hong Kong action film starring Jackie Chan.

Dragon Fist may refer to:

- Dragon Fist (manga), the Japanese manga by Shuu Katayama
- Dragon Fist (Dungeons & Dragons), Dungeons & Dragons campaign setting
- Dragon Fist Explosion!! If Goku Can't Do It, Who Will?, the thirteenth Dragon Ball Z feature movie, also known as Wrath Of The Dragon in Western countries.
- Dragon's fist, a Chinese melee weapon
- Xiaomei and the Flame Dragon's Fist, a 2019 video game inspired by Kung-Fu Master
- "Dragon Fist", song by Jay Chou from the 2002 album The Eight Dimensions
