= Princess Ai =

Japanese manga series

- Cover art of Japanese edition of Princess Ai, Volume 1: Destitution (2004)

プリンセス·アイ物語 (Purinsesu Ai Monogatari)
- Genre: Gothic fantasy; Romance
- Manga
- Written by: Courtney Love; Stuart Levy (psd. D.J. Milky)
- Illustrated by: Ai Yazawa; Misaho Kujiradou
- Published by: Shinshokan
- English publisher: AUS: Madman Entertainment; NA: Tokyopop
- Magazine: Wings
- Original run: 2004 – 2005
- Volumes: 3
- Manga

Princess Ai: The Prism of Midnight Dawn
- Written by: Christine Boylan; Stuart Levy (psd. D.J. Milky)
- Illustrated by: Ai Yazawa; Misaho Kujiradou
- Published by: Kirohuti Fujiwara
- English publisher: NA: Tokyopop
- Original run: 2008 – 2009
- Volumes: 2

Princess Ai (Japanese: プリンセス·アイ物語, Hepburn: Purinsesu Ai Monogatari; lit. 'The Story of Princess Ai') is a manga series created and co-written by American musician and singer Courtney Love and Stuart Levy, with illustration by Ai Yazawa and Misaho Kujiradou. Based in part on Love's own life, the manga follows an amnesiac alien character, Ai, who is transported to Tokyo from her war-torn homeland, where she attempts to piece her life together.

Co-written by Love and Levy, the manga was initially featured in Japan in Shinshokan's Wings magazine, and later published in English by Tokyopop in three volumes between 2004 and 2006. A sequel, Princess Ai: The Prism of Midnight Dawn, was later published in two volumes in 2008 and 2010, respectively, and was written by Christine Boylan and Levy. Tokyopop re-released the original Princess Ai series in one volume, Princess Ai: The Ultimate Edition on October 9, 2007.

Additionally, comic strips, art books, coloring books, fan books, and action figures based on the series and its characters have been released.

== Plot ==
A young, amnesiac alien girl known only as Princess Ai is mysteriously transported to Tokyo, Japan from her war-torn home, Ai-Land, which is in the midst of a revolution. With only a heart-shaped box to clue her in on her past, Ai makes her living as a rock star at Club Cupid. She falls in love with a sensitive musician, Kent, much to the distaste of Kent's gay, possessive roommate, Hikaru. The plot complicates as talent agents of the H.T.A and demons seeking to take control of Ai's homeland, Ai-Land, pursue her for their own ends.

== Characters ==
=== Primary characters ===
==== Princess Ai ====
Princess Ai is the main character of the story. She is the product of a relationship between a human father, King Sei, and a Dougen (Angel) mother. Because of the war that rages between the Humans and the Dougen in Ai-Land, Ai's true parentage was kept a secret, even from Ai herself. Due to her mixed heritage, Ai has wings on her back and the ability to control people's emotions with her singing. Ai loves Nora and Kent, and she is torn between the two. She is fiercely independent. Her heart-shaped box she always keeps with her is made of pure tenketsu, the blood of angels, the primary source of energy throughout Ai-Land. Tenketsu is fatal to humans; If Dougen touch it, they receive a narcotic reaction.

==== Kent ====
Kent is a young man who works at the Shinjuku University library part-time. Kent is one of the first people to discover Ai after she appeared in Tokyo, and offers her a place to stay, causing trouble with his roommate, Hikaru. Like Ai, he is of a mixed heritage, being half-Japanese and half-American, which he draws on to help Ai come to grips with her dual heritage in chapter 11.

=== Secondary characters ===
==== Fa'an ====
He is a street musician with strangely compelling lyrics who helps Ai discover her flair for singing. He has a knack for appearing and disappearing at just the right time. He watches out for Ai, and is associated with the fallen (Princess Ai: Prism of Midnight Dawn). He is a mysterious person who knows of Ai's past.

==== Daisuke ====
He is Kent's coworker at the Shinjuku University library. Kent continually thwarts his efforts to ask Ai out.

==== Hikaru ====
He is Kent's roommate. Hikaru has a huge crush on Kent and a hatred for Ai, fueled by jealousy. Later on in the series, he makes peace with Ai and becomes one of her biggest supporters (volume 3, chapter 11).

- Yoshi - Ai's personal assistant seen in volume 2. He is sometimes mistaken for a very tall woman.
- Lissa - Ai's tutor back in Ai-Land. She was Ai's best friend but Ai kept her wings a secret from her. From a flashback in chapter 12, Lissa told Ai that Queen Lilith wasn't her real mother.
- Shinji - The manager of Club Cupid. He lets Ai sing at Club Cupid.
- Jen - The one singer at Club Cupid who takes the time to befriend Ai. Later on in the story, Jen dies getting Ai's heart-shaped box back from a robber.
- Nora - A leader of the revolutionaries in Ai-Land, this Angel wants equality—not superiority—over humans, but not everyone shares his views. He got really close to Ai and sent her to Earth for her safety. He didn't know that Ai was one of them but knew that Ai is someone who will change the world.

=== Antagonists ===
==== Takeshi ====
A VIP at the nightclub Club Cupid who works for H.T.A., an infamous Japanese talent agency. He is ordered by Hayabusa to eliminate Ai during her worldwide stadium tour. (chapter 14)

==== Hayabusa ====
Takeshi's boss, the president of H.T.A. (Hayabusa Talent Agency), who is allegedly connected with the yakuza. He plans to use Ai's talent for his own success.

==== Hiro ====
Ai's manager at H.T.A. He is ordered by Hayabusa to keep Ai under control. He tries to kill Ai during a blackout in chapter 15 but her true powers came to light. He got arrested for shooting the gun at Ai.

==== Kaz ====
Nora's radical cousin who believes that the human royal family must be conquered at all costs. Much to Nora's dismay, Kaz dispatched Tess to capture Ai. But later on, he discovers the truth about Ai and understands Nora's point (chapter 15).

- Kemo - He is only seen in Princess Ai: The Prism of Midnight Dawn. He is one of the angels who helped with the second revolution, and is in league with Kaz. However, he now harbours a personal revenge against Ai, and is on the brink of insanity
- Tess - One of the 3 Furies of Ai-Land, she was sent to search out and drag Ai back to her planet. After a radical change of heart, she becomes Ai's protector (chapter 10). She understands that Ai is the key for peace in Ai-Land and Nora's plan is the right one. She has a dragon on each of her red wings which spews out fire. They are weak to liquid.
- Meggi - The second Furie sister to be sent out to fetch Ai in chapter 11. She is Tess's younger sister. She is devoted to Kaz and is weak to flowers. She uses jealousy and vengeance to manipulate her enemies. She has snakes on each of her wings.
- Alexa - She is third Furie Sisters to be sent out in chapter 13. She is Tess's and Meggi's sister, and Kaz's last hope to return Ai to Ai-Land. She has the power to freeze time. It is suspected that she has a crush on Takeshi.

== Development and Production ==
Princess Ai is a loose adaptation of Courtney Love's life story, with Ai functioning as Love's fantasy alter ego. In a 2003 interview concerning the series, Love stated: "I have always loved the Japanese culture and people. Princess Ai is a great character, because she feels like my alter ego, but in a fantasy setting." The word "Ai" means "love" in Japanese. It is also generally believed that Kent, the sensitive, blonde guitar player who becomes Ai's love interest, is based on Courtney Love's late husband, Kurt Cobain.

Co-created and co-written by Love and D.J. Milky, the initial run of Princess Ai was written and illustrated by Misaho Kujiradou and featured character designs by Ai Yazawa. According to Nielsen BookScan sales reports, Princess Ai topped the Adult Fiction Overall Trade Paper Graphic Novels list for the week ending July 25, 2004. Princess Ai was published in three volumes from July 6, 2004, to February 7, 2006.Madman Entertainment released Princess Ai in New Zealand and Australia. The series is also licensed in Germany by Tokyopop Germany, in France by Soleil Manga, in Italy by J-Pop, in Finland by Punainen jättiläinen, in Russia by Comix-ART. and in Argentina by Deus Ex.

The sequel, Princess Ai: The Prism of Midnight Dawn, was published by Tokyopop in two volumes in December 2008 and December 2009. It is also licensed in Germany by Tokyopop Germany, in France by Soleil Manga, and in Italy by J-Pop.

Volume 3 of Princess Ai: The Prism of Midnight Dawn was planned to be released on March 1, 2011, but, as of 2019, remains unreleased.

== Publications ==
=== Manga ===
==== Princess Ai ====
| No. | Title | Original release date | North American release date |
|---|---|---|---|
| 01 | Destitution | July 1, 2004; 978-4-403-61760-7 | July 6, 2004; 978-1-59182-669-9 |
| 02 | Lumination | March 1, 2005; 978-4-403-61788-1 | July 12, 2005; 978-1-59182-670-5 |
| 03 | Evolution | September 1, 2005; 978-4-403-61807-9 | February 6, 2006; 978-1-59182-671-2 |

==== Princess Ai: The Prism of Midnight Dawn ====
| No. | North American release date | North American ISBN |
|---|---|---|
| 01 | December 9, 2008 | 978-1-4278-1299-5 |
| 02 | December 29, 2009 | 978-1-4278-1300-8 |

=== Other media ===
Multiple books based on Princess Ai have been published by Tokyopop. A 72-page art book, Princess Ai: Roses & Tattoos, which included poetry by D.J. Milky, was published on February 13, 2007. On March 12, 2008, Princess Ai: Rumors From The Other Side, a fan book which contained twelve short stories, was published.

Additionally, a colored comic strip collection, Princess Ai of Ai-Land: The Comic Strip Collection, was published on July 8, 2008. On September 1, 2008, Princess Ai: Encounters was released; it featured Princess Ai meeting characters from other Tokyopop manga. Running Press also published a 128-page coloring book, Color Me Manga: Princess Ai, on November 12, 2007.

== Merchandise ==
In 2005, the Los Angeles-based company Bleeding Edge released a series of action figures based on Princess Ai. These included 7 inches (0.18 m) and 12 inches (0.30 m) figures of Princess Ai in various states and attires based on scenes in the manga, including: "Angelic", "Borrowed Threads", "Club Cupid", "Evening", "Fell to Earth", and "Rock 'n' Roll" Ai.

At the 2005 San Diego Comic-Con, a Princess Ai cosplay contest was held, with Bleeding Edge providing the action figures as prizes.
