= Liling-Po =

Japanese manga series

リリン-ポ (Ririn-po)
- Genre: Adventure
- Manga
- Written by: Ako Yutenji
- Published by: Shinshokan
- English publisher: NA: Tokyopop
- Magazine: Wings
- Original run: 1997 – 2006
- Volumes: 9

Liling-Po (リリン-ポ, Ririn-po) is a Japanese manga written and illustrated by Ako Yutenji. The manga is published in Shinshokan's Wings. The English-language release of manga has been licensed in North America by Tokyopop and a German-language release in Germany by Egmont Publishing.
