= Hakase Mizuki =

Japanese manga artist

Hakase Mizuki 水月博士
- Born: Hokkaidō, Japan
- Area: Manga artist
- Notable works: The Demon Ororon and Kuruizaki no Hana

Hakase Mizuki (水月博士, Mizuki Hakase) is a Japanese manga artist born in Hokkaidō, Japan. She made her manga debut with The Monsters Collection in the June 1997 issue of Wings, published by Shinshokan. Her representative works include Asian Beat, Baku, The Demon Ororon and Demon Flowers.

== Works ==
Name	Year	Notes	Refs
The Demon Ororon (悪魔のオロロン, Akuma no Ororon)	1998–2001	Serialized in Wings magazine Published by Shinshokan for 4 volumes.	
Asian Beat (アジアンビート)	2002	Published for 1 volumes.	
Baku (ばく)	2003	Serialized in Wings magazine. Published by Shinshokan for 1 volume.	
Demon Flowers (狂い咲きの花, Kurizaki no Hana)	2004–06	Published by Shinshokan for 5 volumes.	
Empire of Midnight (真夜中の帝国, Mayonaka no Teikoku)	2007	Follow-up to The Demon Ororon	
Dracul	2013	Ran in Zero Sum Ward magazine.	

Other titles
Maybe Blue (not yet collected in a tankōbon release)
Mephisto (collected in Baku tankōbon)
Monkey Magic (not yet collected in a tankōbon release)
The Monsters Collection (debut work, not yet collected in a tankōbon release)
Sugar (not yet collected in a tankōbon release)
Yuki no Furu Machi (collected in Asian Beat tankōbon)
