= List of Vampire Game characters =

This is a list of characters in the manga series Vampire Game.

== Main characters ==
=== Ishtar ===
The young and impatient princess of St. Pheliosta. She is very quick-tempered, and can't understand the idea of tradition. She often feels as if her kingdom only loves her because she has the blood of St. Phelios, which leads her to have a slight hatred for her ancestry. Despite being a princess, she tries to live her life a normal girl, but can't help getting herself and those around her into trouble. She is also deeply in love with her personal bodyguard, Darres. At the end of the manga she is married to Darres with two twin sons. One is the reincarnation of Phelios, the other is Duzell. Because she had loved Duzell, she had promised to give birth to his reincarnation if he was killed, so he wouldn't have to wait a hundred years.

=== Duzell ===
The dreaded Vampire King. Bored with his immortality, he forced his minions to attack the human race in an all-out war. After losing the battle against the white knight Phelios, he was killed, but swore revenge on Phelios' bloodline. Now, reincarnated as a helpless housecat, Duzell searches for the reincarnation of Phelios. At first he thinks it is Ishtar, but after tasting her blood he finds this is not true. In the last volume, he says that if he had to guess without tasting any blood, he would guess Ishtar. As a former vampire, he was quite malicious and selfish, as well as bisexual. However, after he meets Ishtar, his personality softens and through several adventures, he learns what love truly is.

Duzell has shapeshifting ability, which allows him to go almost undetected in Pheliosta, although his cover is almost blown a few times. He can still do magic, even as a kyawl (a tigerlike creature). At first he can only look like a cat, but after sampling Ishtar's blood, he can turn into an exact duplicate—except he's still male. Later on, his power grows to the point where he can regain his true form. Though he is never actually shown doing it, when he first transforms into Ishtar he notes that he can't seem to change genders yet, indicating that from the time he regained his full power he could become a perfect copy of Ishtar.

At the end of the series, Duzell has fallen in love with Ishtar. But she is in love with Darres, and so Duzell keeps his feelings to himself. He uses the self-destructive "La Gamme" spell to save both Darres and Ishtar (After promising Vord to protect Ishtar and promising Ishtar to protect Darres), and is later reborn as one of twin boys born to Darres and Ishtar (and is given his name a third time, Duzell).

=== Darres ===
Ishtar's personal protector. He was an orphan, raised by the knight Selen specifically to protect Ishtar, whom she looked on like a daughter. Toddler Ishtar started annoying him immediately when she threw soup in his face and ran away, but when undead creatures broke in, Darres saved her life. Later on, she loudly demanded that Darres be her bodyguard, and he went along with it. She also yelled out that she was going to marry Darres when she grew up.

Now, at twenty-seven, Darres is a master swordsman, but quite dense and oblivious at times, and Ishtar thinks he is an "idiot" for caring so much about everyone he knows. While he accompanies Ishtar on all her journeys, he also has to chase after her whenever she goes off on a quest of her own.

It takes Darres a long time to realize how much Ishtar loves him, since he originally thought of her as a shallow wiseass who acted without thinking. Still, he would do anything for Ishtar, even give his life. At the end of the series, Darres marries Ishtar and they have twin baby boys.

=== Yujinn ===
Ishtar's magic teacher. Unknown to the people of St. Pheliosta, Yuujin is actually Ishtar's cousin, Yuujel. He's had affairs with half of Zi Alda, men and women, and most of his former lovers are hunting for them to bring him back (none of them seem to know that he's been around). He's similarly popular in Pheliosta, where he gets valentines from several women and one man.

He has apparently always been attractive, since even as a child the little girls mobbed. One childhood friend, Leene, who is madly in love with him, even forced him into a suicide pact; after that failed, he convinced his friend Ashley to propose to Leene. However, this did not rid him of Leene's infatuation.

He first met Ishtar when he was a teenager and she a small child, but she rejected him, announcing that she wanted to marry Darres. It may be that honesty and lack of flattery that led him to love Ishtar. Knowing that she would reject him if he came as a suitor, he took the name of Yuujin and took a job as her tutor.

The kingdom finds him very mysterious, and Jill and Krai in particular believe Yujinn and Darres are having an affair. Yujinn actually does care for Darres, however the exact nature of his feelings is unclear (he indicates in one scene that he loves Darres romantically, yet he might simply be yanking Darres' chain).

He is a powerful wizard, and like Darres, is often looking out for Ishtar. He admits himself to be in love with Ishtar, but keeps his feelings secret because he knows she loves Darres. He also says to Leene that "he seems to want things that he cannot have," stating that if Ishtar were to fall in love with him, he would lose interest in her (And if Leene had truly loved Ashley, he would be attracted to Leene. Which did not go well with Leene). As a result, he tries to help Ishtar marry her true love.

At the end of the 14th volume, Yujinn is killed by The King of Razenia who, at the time, is possessed by the vampire Sharlen. Moments before his death he says he loves both Darres and Ishtar, and if he could choose how he would be reborn, he would want to be with both of them.

=== Vord ===
The youngest son of Queen Ramia, and prince of La Naan. He is actually not from La Naan, but from Razenia. He was born one of two twin boys, and in Razenia the youngest twin is considered evil; as a result, he was sent to La Naan. After his brother's death, the King of Razenia kept asking to get Vord back, but since he is Ramia's favorite, she is loath to give him up.

Self-centered and conceited, the moment Vord spots Ishtar, he knows he must have her. However, the Ishtar he falls in love with is actually Duzell in disguise. He and Queen Ramia set up an elaborate scheme to marry into the family of Pheliosta, but it blows up in their face when it is revealed that Vord is not actually Ramia's son. He later follows Ishtar back to St. Pheliosta to keep a watch over her, and then falls for Ishtar's cousin, Falan.

Vord is a master swordsman, extremely tall with a 'legendary' tan and pale blonde hair, and confident that he is the best. He shares Ishtar's tendency to say the wrong thing. But he is more clever than he appears and happens to be the brightest out of Lady Ramia's boys. He almost managed to figure out Duzell's double identity, but was interrupted before he came to a conclusion. He later learned of Duzell's presence, and Ishtar's double identity. This shook his self-confidence badly, especially when he realized that he had fallen in love with Duzell.

According to Falan, he can burp opera arias. He also married Falan and as King of Razenia at end of story.

=== Keld ===
Ishtar's royal advisor, who helped raise her and thinks of her as a daughter. He is always attempting to discipline Ishtar, but nothing ever works on her. He is also hard of hearing, which enables Ishtar to toy with him.

Keld is distantly related to the royal family by marriage, since he was a relative of Queen Sonia's late husband. As a result, Ishtar thinks that he wants her to marry Yuujel simply to become a part of the royal family, and is using her because of her status. She becomes very unkind and disrespectful to "the old fart," even claiming that he's senile at one point.

But when Yuujel reports that Darres is eligible to marry Ishtar, Keld gives his approval, much to Ishtar's surprise. He reveals that he only favored a marriage with Yuujel because he had half the royal blood of other royalty, and thus would be more likely to have a healthy child with Ishtar.

=== Jill ===
One of Ishtar's knights. He is slightly timid, and is always taken aback by Krai's antics. He is the brains of the duo, and has an innocent charm about him that attracts women; he also helps Darres more than Krai does, rather than heading off to brothels.

Like many other minor characters, Jill appears to be bisexual. At one point, he tells Krai and Darres that he's "glad he swore off men," then later gets a valentine from a girl he likes.

=== Krai ===
One of Ishtar's knights. He is somewhat of a bumbling fool, and is always getting himself into trouble. He's not very bright, and constantly thinks of women. During one mission, instead of searching for Ishtar, he heads over to a brothel and in La Naan the women in the castle refer to him as "Krai the conqueror". However, his straightforward attitude doesn't get him much luck with the ladies—on Valentine's Day, he is the only male to receive no gifts and end up with a broken heart.

== The Royal House of La Naan ==
=== Laphiji ===
The second oldest son of Queen Ramia, and prince of La Naan. Unlike his brothers, he is very quiet and doesn't often express his feelings. He was adopted at a young age, when his brother Seilez was born to his adoptive father and a prostitute, and Queen Ramia decided that she wanted to adopt children of her own. He belonged to a mercenary tribe called the Shonay, who sold him like a slave.

Unlike his brothers, Laphiji is a very strong magician, courtesy of the "eye" tattoo on his forehead. He was kidnapped as a small child by his tribe, who gave him the tattoo—as a result, his entire body is filled with holy magic, which Ishtar describes as "Sidia with pecs!" He's so powerful, he is able to effectively fight Sharlen unless interrupted. It also served to alienate him from his adoptive mother, who does not treat him as fondly as Vord. She does, however, seem to have some affection from him.

He also has a complex relationship with Seilez, whom he has protected and comforted (both emotionally and physically) since a young age. Vord reveals in the third volume that Laphiji is actually in love with Seilez, and around the tenth volume, a line of Vord's indicates that the two "brothers" are now involved in a furtive sexual relationship, although probably not one that will last.

Laphiji is tall, slender and broad-shouldered, with pronounced muscles and a long black braid. According to Judal, he has a wonderful singing voice, but he has to be drunk to show it.

=== Seiliez ===
The oldest son of Queen Ramia, and prince of La Naan. He is a sweet individual, but very frail emotionally and physically. He is the black sheep of the family, since his adoptive mother loathes him and never avoids a chance to publicly humiliate him, even to forcing him to show up at a party in drag so she can verbally and physically abuse him.

He knows that Ramia is not his mother, however, since he regularly dresses as a woman and visits his birth mother, a prostitute named Murra, who was the king's lover. However, he still craves Ramia's affection, and has done so for many years; when his father died, he tries to comfort Ramia, only to have her throw him off and call him a whore's son.

He falls in love with Ishtar after she treats him kindly, since all the people around him ignore, despise or pity him. Hoping to win her, he enters the competition for her hand in marriage. He enters a pact with the vampire Sharlen, who gives him enough strength to hold his own in the competition, but enslaves him in the process. When Ishtar competes against him, Seilez gives up the competition.

He then apparently embarks on a secret sexual affair with his adopted brother Laphiji. It's clear in the tenth volume that he still deeply loves Ishtar, although he agrees to serve Darres if he marries her.

Seilez is slender and tall, but has delicate feminine features and long blonde hair, which tends to make people mistake him for a girl even when he's dressed like a man. He also appears to be a budding alcoholic, since he gets drunk when visiting brothels or being attacked by Ramia; however, he seems to stop drinking after falling for Ishtar.

=== Ramia ===
The Queen of La Naan and Ishtar's aunt. She is fully intent on getting one of her sons onto the throne of St. Pheliosta, though none of her sons are actually hers, and spends a lot of time setting members of the royal families against each other. Despite this, she has no tolerance for OTHER people's machinations, and even threatens war when her plots are thwarted.

Ramia lived with her cousin Sonia for many years until Sonia was married. She was wedded to the king of La Naan, loved him deeply and wished to have his children, but he only ever thought of her as his relative. After having a miscarriage, she was told that she could not get pregnant again. So her husband brought her a child secretly, and for a year they were happy.

Then it came out that baby Seilez was the king's child with a young prostitute, and so Ramia adopted two other boys—she purchased the infant Laphiji from the Shonay tribe, and accepted baby prince Vord from Razenia. However, this revenge was empty, and she was left caring for the three boys when her husband died.

Ramia is a middle-aged, somewhat chubby woman who rarely smiles, and is known to have a rotten temper. She takes most of this out on her adopted son Seilez, although the servants also fear her temper. She also wishes she had a daughter, so she could have tea parties and shopping trips.

=== Murra ===
Seilez's birth mother, and the onetime lover of the king of La Naan. Murra apparently was involved secretly with the king for some time, and gave birth to his son, who was brought up as his son with his wife Ramia.

Murra is a prostitute at a brothel in a lower part of La Naan, and most of her background is unknown. Her son regularly visits her, dressed as a woman so no one will recognize him, but Murra doesn't want her son to become attached to her, lest his origins become public. When Darres came over to investigate, Murra refused to tell him anything, and even threatened him if he revealed the story behind her son's birth.

She was protected by Darres when some of Sharlen's vampires attacked, hoping to kill her. Later at the competition, she arrived secretly to watch Seilez fight Ishtar. She had hoped he would marry Ishtar, but accepted his decision.

Murra is in her mid-forties but still very beautiful, with blonde hair, delicate features and violet eyes like her son's. She has a rougher manner of speaking, and tends to be rather sarcastic.

== The Kingdom of Ci Xeneth ==
=== Jened ===
The Lord of Ci Xeneth and Ishtar's uncle. Unlike Queen Ramia and Queen Sonia, he is a psychopathic monster, and like Ramia he wants to rule Pheliosta. He is obsessed with ruelles, and regularly sends his knights out to hunt down and bring back monsters to turn into these magical items, including swords and rings.

Jened's advisor is Diaage, who is really Sharlen. When Jened realizes that his most trusted advisor is a vampire, he decides that he can use this to his advantage, and Sharlen seduces him. Then Ishtar sets his zoo of monsters free, and Jened attempts to capture the Lord of the Sea. His plans backfired when his children Illsaide and Falan rebel against him. He escapes and as he's calling for Illsaide to be put to death, his royal knight Gorgen stabs him to death.

=== Illsaide ===
A member of the Ci Xeneth army, and Jened's favorite warrior. Very few people know that he was the result of a monster-human mating, when Jened ravished a monster princess and had the child raised to be the ultimate warrior. As a result of his ancestry, he has powerful magic powers and can wield a holy sword.

He later becomes engaged to Duzell after mistaking him for a woman, and has his identity revealed by Sharlen. After discovering he is the hybrid spawn of Jened and a monster princess—and in love with his own half-sister—Illsaide destroys his own father. He remains in Ci Xeneth as a prince, and agrees to stay away from Falan, even though he still loves her. It crushes him when he sees how Falan is now falling for Vord. With his remarkable powers, he would give either side he joined an advantage. He later leaves Ci Xeneth and joins Lassen's dark army. It is not shown what happens to him after the battle (After Hume sacrificed himself for Illsaide) until the epilogue, when he is found by warriors who described him as "a man with brilliant red hair."

Illsaide has bright red hair from his sea princess mother, and a special knack with holy magic. Rain and water amplify his power, to the point where he can wipe out whole hordes of undead soldiers without lifting a finger.

=== Falan ===
Princess of Ci Xeneth. She is Ishtar's best friend and they can talk to each other about anything. She is the first to notice her father's strange actions, and goes to Ishtar about them. She fell in love with Illsaide, but was shocked to find out he was her own half-brother, so the two decided to simply live as brother and sister. She is later cursed by Lassen and put to sleep, but eventually awakens and falls in love with Vord.

=== Gorgen ===
Lord Jened's personal general. He is tough and strict, and often turns his head when Jened is up to his mischievousness. However, after the battle against the King of Merarim's army, Gorgen realizes his wrongdoings and murders Jened and then commits suicide.

=== Roy ===
A young boy in the Ci Xeneth army. Friendly but naive, Roy is not very skilled in battle, which leads him to being fatally wounded by a monster. However, Sharlen healed him in exchange for becoming his slave.

== The Kingdom of Zi Alda ==
=== Leene ===
A selfish woman who gets upset when she finds out the love of her life, Yuujel, is planning on marrying Ishtar. Evidently she grew up with Ashley and Yuujel, and was smitten with the prince from a young age. She even snared him into a botched suicide pact.

When that failed, Yuujel departed from Zi Alda, but not before telling Ashley to propose to Leene, since he had always loved her. Leene was heartbroken, and agreed to marry Ashley, but told him that she would always love Yuujel and could never love him. Ashley continued trying to win her affection, but Leene kept herself focused on Yuujel, even to the point of never having sex with her husband.

When Ishtar came to Zi Alda, Leene became obsessed with the princess's proposed marriage to Yuujel. She conspired with the vampire Sharlen (who was disguised as a woman, Diaage), who gave her three poison pills to wreck Ishtar's life with. Leene found herself unable to use the first two, but attempted to poison Ishtar at a party. Yuujel reveals later that Ashley replaced her pills with candy fakes, and had been hoping that she would relent at the last minute.

Leene finally had it out with Yuujel, and revealed that she was angry because she knew he would never love her. However, this incident finally ended her fruitless infatuation, and repaired her marriage to Ashley. She attempted to make it up to Ishtar by sending her a love potion (actually just cheap whiskey) in the hopes that she would confess her feelings to Darres.

Leene is small and slender, and looks about ten years younger than she is. She has crinkly blonde hair that she usually keeps in two ponytails or two large buns. She is extremely beautiful, and has men constantly approaching her despite being married. At the end of the series, she and Ashley have a child.

=== Ashley ===
General of the Zi Alda army. Quiet and passive, Ashley rarely speaks but accomplishes any task he sets his mind to. Ever since a child, he has been in love with Leene, but he knew she loved Yuujel. He's also a very good friend of Yuujel's. Eventually, she agreed to marry him, and he promised to make her happy, even though she was continually snappish with him and often treated him cruelly. Moreover, she refused to have sex with him.

He apparently tried to let Leene's infatuation with Yuujel run its course, even to the point of watching her try to poison Ishtar. Of course, he replaced her poison pills with candy duplicates. After Yuujel and Leene hash out their feelings, Leene recognizes her husband's good qualities, and Ashley finally has a happy marriage.

=== Lucy ===
An old friend of Yuujin's and advisor to Ashley. She is a strong, wise woman who appears early on in the manga, speaking secretly to Yuujin over the mirror and advising him on what to do to protect Ishtar, as well as passing secret information to him when necessary.

When Ishtar comes to Zi Alda, Lucy vows to protect her at all costs, and shadows Ishtar to keep her from being harmed by Leene's plotting. She is very suspicious of Leene's actions, and is probably the first to realize something is going to happen between the two girls.

Lucy is tall, slender and has blonde hair and pronounced lipstick. She may be an old girlfriend of Yuujel's, since they have a flirty, close-knit friendship, and she seems to be one of the few women who isn't swooning over him. As a result, Yuujel respects her deeply; And it also seems that she was (or still is) in love with Ashley.

=== Sonia ===
The sickly ruler of Zi Alda and Yuujel's mother. She is probably Ishtar's favorite aunt. She is very kind and gentle, and was one of the few royal descendants of Phelios who married a non-relative, which apparently caused massive social unrest for a time. She also seems to be one of the few who had a good marriage to a person she loved, and lived with Ramia before she married.

At the time of Ishtar's arrival in Zi Alda, Sonia is seriously ill, and Duzell convinces her that she is still needed and should not die just yet. However, Sonia dies soon after their departure from Zi Alda, upsetting Duzell greatly.

After Sonia's death, Yuujel made up the lie that she had had a bastard son—Darres—who was suitable to be Ishtar's suitor. This set out an uproar, especially from Ramia for she had grown up with Sonia and believed this was false. Although almost everyone expected this to be another one of Yuujel's lies, no one could ask Lady Sonia to prove him wrong because she had passed.

== Villains of Mil Seii ==
=== Lassen ===
The Lord of Mil Seii. A devious young man, he plans on ruling St. Pheliosta one way or another. He is the main villain of the story, and sets up various plans and plots to kill Ishtar and take over the throne. Though he doesn't care much for vampires, he is always hanging around them, and is possibly in love with Lailis. He also wants to get rid of Duzell, as he knows he has been reincarnated. In the end, Duzell kills Lassen and himself with the "La Gamme" spell, knowing that there was no other way to end everything.

=== Sharlen ===
The self-appointed new Vampire King. He is a manipulative, seductive vampire with a mysterious way about himself. He first appears as Vord's fortune-teller, but later bites several people and his presence becomes known to the heroes. He is the first one to realize Duzell had been reincarnated, and doesn't feel threatened by him. He has many vampires that support him and often tempts Lailis into becoming a vampire again.

Sharlen appears through various guises, in both genders, and is only apparently recognizable as a vampire to Duzell and certain magic users. Otherwise, he appears as an attractive human male of indeterminate age (he sometimes appears older than his true form is). He also appears to be bisexual, since we see attractions to both men and women.

He is the son of King Phelios and the vampire Diaage.

=== Lailis ===
Lassen's lover and the reincarnation of Duzell's former general, Rishas. Though formerly a male, she has been reincarnated as a woman. She desperately loves Duzell and wants to return to how things were. But, when she realizes Duzell has softened, she plans on killing him alongside Lassen. As Lailis, she is very weak and fragile.

=== Hume ===
A pompous knight working for Lassen. He is very cheerful, but also very skilled in battle. While he doesn't like vampires, he is thought to be undead himself. This is not true. He is a knight of Lodoc, an army forced to submit to complete loyalty to the queen of Lodoc in exchange for superhuman ability on the battlefield. He is always at Lassen's side, but occasionally works with Sharlen. It is later revealed that he is in love with Illsaide.

== Other characters ==
=== Lilke ===
A delicate-looking creature, like a mermaid with wings. The lilke is not fragile, however, since she almost mortally wounds a knight when the knights captured her. Jened intended to turn her into a valuable ruelle, but Ishtar set all the monsters free. The lilke is pregnant, which makes Ishtar urge her to leave.

=== The Lord of the Sea ===
A godlike sea monster, who appears as a giant Poseiden-like man with aquatic details. He can also appear as a frail old man, and Ishtar and Duzell rescue him from highway bandits, at risk to themselves. He is deeply grateful for this, and thinks they are better than most humans. He comes to Ci Xeneth to find his daughter, a beautiful red-haired girl who was kidnapped by Jened. It turns out she is dead, but before she died she was raped by the king, and gave birth to a half-human child.

This horrifies the Lord of the Sea. He and his monsters destroy much of the palace, and the Lord of the Sea attempts to kill his grandson. He has a change of heart after Illsaide turns on his father. The Lord of the Sea was mortally injured in the battle, and before he dies, he commands the monsters to leave, and if Illsaide ever comes to the sea, to welcome him as if he were his own son.

=== Selen ===
Known as the Dark Angel, a Holy Knight who served as the Captain before Darres. A feisty, angelic-looking warrior, Selen can hold her own with the male knights who serve under her. She adopted Darres for the specific purpose of protecting Ishtar, although she also had great affection for the boy, in an older-sister kind of way (Though Ishtar has reason to believe that Selen and Darres are in love). She once had a longtime lesbian relationship with the late Queen, and so she seems to look on Ishtar as a surrogate daughter, and wants desperately to protect her. Selen does not appear until Volume 13, when she returns from a diplomatic mission to Razenia.

=== St. Phelios ===
Not much is actually known about St. Phelios, except that he was a mage-warrior-king who is still revered in Pheliosta. He sacrificed his life to destroy Duzell, with the deadly spell known as La Gamme; Duzell swore that they would both be reborn in a century, and that he would kill Phelios. Ishtar considers him an overrated idiot, and says that she doesn't even want to think about who he shacked up with. However, she gains new respect for him as the series goes on, as does his old enemy Duzell.

He evidently had at least a few children (one being Sharlen for he had a relationship with Diaage, Sharlen's mother) and his descendants are all intermarried by now. It is suspected that he was reborn as Yuujel; he was certainly reborn as one of two baby boys born to Ishtar and Darres, with his old nemesis Duzell as his new brother.

=== Maroa ===
Jill's girlfriend. Maroa seems to be a staunch feminist, and upset her boyfriend by saying that giving chocolate was symptomatic of the patriarchy and pandering to confectionery companies. However, she relents and brings him some chocolate anyway.
