= Café Kichijouji de =

Japanese manga series

- Cover of Café Kichijōji de volume 1 as published by Shinshokan

Café吉祥寺で
- Genre: Comedy, Supernatural
- Manga
- Written by: Yuki Miyamoto
- Illustrated by: Kyoko Negishi
- Published by: Shinshokan
- English publisher: NA: Digital Manga Publishing
- Magazine: Wings
- Original run: 2000 – 2002
- Volumes: 3
- Drama CD
- Television drama
- Directed by: Keita Motohashi
- Music by: Yuko Fukushima
- Original network: TV Tokyo
- Original run: September 29, 2008 – December 26, 2008
- Episodes: 64

Café Kichijouji de (Café吉祥寺で, Café Kichijōji de; lit. "At Café Kichijōji") is a manga written by Yuki Miyamoto and illustrated by Kyoko Negishi. The story surrounds five bishōnen and their rather unlucky manager as they go about their daily routine at their café.

== Characters ==
=== Main characters ===
Kurihara Taro
Taro is usually considered the cutest and mature worker at the café. He is a fastidious neat freak in glasses, and cannot stand disorder. It is too bad that one of his fellow employees wreaks havoc wherever he goes. Taro is the second in command of the café, and his co-workers generally do as he says, with the exception of Minagawa and Maki. His apartment is spotless, and visitors have to go through a full body sanitization in order to come in. Taro has a huge closet full of different types of cleansers, and sends off overseas in order to get many of them. He used to be less obsessive about cleanliness until he fell under a sea of filth when visiting Maki's apartment. Taro has an ongoing rivalry with Maki, and is often seen hitting him over the head with a mop or various items.
Okubo Maki
The rebellious pretty boy of the group, Maki lives to irritate Taro. Often Minagawa will step in and use voodoo in order to keep the fights from escalating. Despite his good looks, Maki is an enormous slob, and his apartment has little to no room for movement. He is the head waiter of the cafe, and often tries to hit on attractive female customers. Which, for the most part, results in rejection.
Tokumi Shuta
A happy-go-lucky boy, Toku is often very naive and easily taken advantage of. He is one of the part-timers in the cafe that is currently going to college. Toku attends an unnamed athletic college, and has a master/servant relationship with several of his fellow female students. Due to his penchant for accidental destruction, Toku's paycheck is usually very slim. As such, he is usually starving and lives in a dilapidated apartment without a bath. Shuta does, however, have two pet hamsters which his co-workers refer to as a reserve food supply.
Minagawa Hifumi
A great cook and more than slightly creepy, Minagawa works behind the scenes at the café. He is very proficient in all forms of dark arts, and often uses it to get his way. His cooking tastes great, but how he prepares the food appears to be somewhat dodgy, as he uses a Necronomicon of sorts as his cooking guide. Minagawa has a strange sense of humor. He once sent his co-workers on a wild goose chase to prepare the day's dishes when Minagawa had the day off. No matter what strange happenings occur in the café, he is never rattled. The manager's daughter also has a crush on Minagawa, after he reprimanded her for trying to destroy the café and cut off Sukekiyo's whiskers.
Ichinomiya Jun
The youngest member of the group, and one of the part-timers, Jun is often the most agreeable. He is very cute, polite and accommodating. However, Jun's pretty face hides an enormous temper that is provoked whenever anyone calls him cute or girl-like. He possesses inhuman strength that enables him to lift enormous boulders or the occasional cattle. Jun has a gang of schoolgirls that obey his every command, leading to a common belief that Jun's sweet personality only goes so deep.

=== Minor characters ===
Mitaka Yuichi
The ever burdened manager of the café, he manages somehow to keep everything afloat. The task of running the cafe, doubled with trying to make enough money to cover daily damages, often leaves Mitaka with very little time to spend with his family. His daughter Reina tried to regain his attention by destroying the café, hoping that it would give him more time to be with her.
Mitaka Reina
Adorable, yet pesky, Reina idolizes her father, but wishes that he would spend more time with her. Not knowing where her father worked, she wandered around until she saw Taro. Recognizing the uniform, she followed him until they reached the café. Initially there was some confusion about why Taro was wandering around with a 4-5 year old girl (which ranged from paedophilia to fatherhood), but it was eventually cleared up why she was there. Reina tried destroying the store, but was stopped by Minagawa after she started bullying the store cat, Sukekiyo, almost cutting off its whiskers. After being scolded Reina developed a strong crush on Minagawa, informing her father that she was going to marry him. He was not pleased.
Sukekiyo
A fat black cat, Sukekiyo is the store cat. If there was a mascot for the store, Sukekiyo would be it. It is rumoured that most of his body mass is made up of fur and that he was initially many different cats. Of all of the employees, Minagawa is the most attached to him.

== Manga ==
Unlike many other manga, there is no central or linear plotline to the series. Instead the manga is made up of individual stories divided by shorter stories called Chichai.

The manga was licensed in English by Digital Manga Publishing and was released between October 2005 and June 2006.

== Live-action drama ==
The drama CDs were adapted into a live-action drama whose 64 episodes aired on TV Tokyo from September 29, 2008, to December 26, 2008. One notable change is that the role of Mitaka Yuichi has been changed from a male shop owner to a female shop owner. Also, the actor playing Taro is noticeably older than the character's original age.
