= Alice the 101st =

Japanese manga series

- Cover of the first manga volume

101人目のアリス (101 Hitome no Alice)
- Genre: Comedy, Romance
- Manga
- Written by: Chigusa Kawai
- Published by: Shinshokan
- English publisher: NA: Digital Manga Publishing
- Magazine: Wings
- Original run: April 28, 2007 – February 28, 2015
- Volumes: 9

Alice the 101st (Japanese: 101人目のアリス, Hepburn: Hiyakuichimen no Arisu) is a Japanese manga written and illustrated by Chigusa Kawai.

== Plot ==
The Mondonville Music Academy is considered the highest elite in the country with only 100 students being accepted yearly. 14-year-old Aristide "Alice" Lang is a misfit and baffles both the staff and students around him when he becomes the 101st student to be accepted in this year's intake after a personal interview and performance impresses the board. Before Lang was another 101st student who was a child prodigy and grew up to be famous; the piece so expertly performed by Lang was also this man's signature composition.

== Characters ==
Aristide Lang – 14-year-old Aristide came from the countryside to attend Mondonveille Music Academy because of his grandfather's dying wish and also because the professor he admires teaches there. He can't read scores and barely knows the basics, but he possesses great memory and ears, and can play one song perfectly. He's quite energetic and loud, and tends to be an airhead.

Victor De Corteau – A third-year honor student at Mondonveille and quite famous at school for being a brilliant violinist, though he eventually switched to viola major. He first mistook Alice for a female and tried to hit on him, resulting in the latter punching him (although he seems to get a thrill getting smacked around by Alice). He seems very attached to Alice and looks out for him, even joking that they are in love. Vick seems secretly related to Max somehow and even asks Alice to be Max's rival; in return, he will help Alice find Alice's father's violin.

Theophile Maier – Theo is Alice's roommate and also the first friend Alice made. Theo is knowledgeable, shy, and kind but is constantly bullied by Richard because their parents are co-workers and don't get along. He usually sits beside Alice in most of their classes, and he is the one that Alice relies on whenever he is in trouble. Theo has a crush on Claire.

Maximilien Brant — Ranked first for the entrance examination. Though he looks very serious when playing his violin, most of the time he's seen with an entirely different personality. Alice commented that he's a space case, sleeping in weird places, not proper, and hardly making sense when he talks. Max is no good at remembering people's names but he manages to remember Alice's. He was nice enough to help Alice with his song for his periodic concert. Max seems to somehow be related to Victor. Victor comments that Max's technique is number one, but his sound sounds empty.

Richard De Diamant – He ranked second for the entrance exam and the only one he thinks worthy of being his rival is Max. Richard is extremely arrogant and always tries to put down Alice for his lack of talent. He has an older brother in third year majoring in Cello. Richard admires Victor's talent and views him as a role model.

Claire Delna – First supporting female character in this manga, Claire is conservative, serious and wields a blunt personality. She first appears when she accidentally knocks Alice in the head with her heavy cello case (a running gag), but instead of caring about Alice, she was more concerned about her cello. She has a habit of making blunt comments with little regard about the other's feelings.

Georges Saphir – Originally a character from Chigusa's La Esperanca manga but now attending the same school as Alice; he is in third year majoring in piano. Everyone considers him a beauty with his golden hair and green eyes.

== Release ==
The manga was serialized in Shinshokan's magazine Wings between April 28, 2007, and February 28, 2015. The individual chapters were later published on tankōbon format between November 8, 2007, and May 23, 2015. Digital Manga Publishing has released four English-language volumes of the series in North America from June 9, 2010, to June 25, 2014.

No.	Original release date	Original ISBN	English release date	English ISBN
1	November 8, 2007	978-4-403-61884-0	June 9, 2010	978-1-569-70166-9
2	August 22, 2008	978-4-403-61913-7	September 22, 2010	978-1-569-70169-0
3	May 20, 2009	978-4-403-61933-5	December 25, 2013	978-1-569-70290-1
4	March 24, 2010	978-4-403-61963-2	June 25, 2014	978-1-569-70291-8
5	April 26, 2011	978-4-403-62104-8	—	—
6	May 25, 2012	978-4-403-62144-4	—	—
7	May 25, 2013	978-4-403-62162-8	—	—
8	June 25, 2014	978-4-403-62179-6	—	—
9	May 23, 2015	978-4-403-62196-3	—	—

== Reception ==
"Alice the 101st has a fair number of things in its favour, from the strong musical execution to some fun characters, but it still lacks that real oomph factor needed to keep readers hooked." – Lissa Pattillo, Anime News Network.

"Alice the 101st charmed me with its enthusiastic characters and expressive, detailed art. For a book I had zero expectations for, I enjoyed it a lot." – Julie Opipari, Mania.

"None of this would be very convincing if manga artist Chigusa Kawai had skimped on the musical research, but she avoids one of the most common traps of this genre by showing us that native talent alone isn't a guarantee of artistic ability; practice and a solid grounding in the fundamentals play equally important roles in a musician's development." – Katherine Dacey, The Manga Critic.

"Alice the 101st is a cute and prettily drawn manga, created by Chigusa Kawai, the same manga artist behind the La Esperanca series. It feels like a mostly carefree read, though there are parts that get more dramatic and sad." – Danica Davidson, Graphic Novel Reporter.
