= The Devil Within (manga) =

Japanese manga series

- Cover of the first volume of The Devil Within as published by Shinshokan

天使の中に悪魔アリ (Tenshi no Naka ni Akuma Ari)
- Genre: Comedy, Shotacon, Supernatural
- Manga
- Written by: Ryō Takagi
- Published by: Shinshokan
- English publisher: NA: Go! Comi
- Magazine: Wings
- Original run: September 26, 2002 – October 26, 2004
- Volumes: 2

The Devil Within (Japanese: 天使の中に悪魔アリ, Hepburn: Tenshi no Naka ni Akuma Ari) is a Japanese manga series written and illustrated by Ryō Takagi. The Devil Within is about a teenage girl who dislikes grown men and has feelings for her younger-looking neighbour, Tenshi. Her father, Satan-sama, presents her with three adult suitors. The manga was published in Japan by Shinshokan, running in Wings magazine between September 26, 2002, and October 26, 2004. Two tankōbon volume were released on December 12, 2003, and February 24, 2006, by Shinshokan. It was licensed in North America by Go! Comi.

== Summary ==
As a child, Rion saw an uncensored tape that showed demons possessing little boys who would later grow up to be demons and attack young girls. From then on she was convinced that young boys were angels who would turn into villainous devils when they got older. Now that Rion has grown into a pretty young girl, she only has eyes for little boys and avoids “devils” at all costs. She even goes to an all-girl school in order to avoid men.

The manga starts as her father – “the big devil” – is coming home from being out of town. Rion goes to buy groceries for dinner and on her way home she is attacked by a scruffy-looking vagrant who is demanding food. Luckily, a handsome man stops the attack, but Rion thinks it is a ruse perpetrated by the two of them to get to her. So she runs home and hurries to the elevator, but a man jumps in the elevator with her. She runs away from him and takes the stairs all the way to the top of the complex, but on the way she runs into a gorgeous young boy named Tenshi who looks exactly like her first love. She falls for him instantly, but he seems uninterested.

When Rion makes it to her room, the scruffy vagrant, the handsome do-gooder, and the man from the elevator are all there waiting for her! It turns out that Rion's father gathered them all together and they are all now her fiancés. Over the next few days she is supposed to choose one of them to marry, whether she likes it or not. Now all she wants to do is be with Tenshi, but these beautiful men keep throwing themselves at her. It certainly does not help when the big devil gives all of them a key to her room so they can drop by whenever they want. Oh, what is a girl to do?

== Characters ==
Rion Ryuzaki

A beautiful, hot-tempered girl traumatized by a glimpse of an adult video when she was younger, Rion is terrified of men. Much to the disappointment of all the boys her age, she only likes younger guys. After her adopted father arranged her to pick three boys as her fiancé, Rion slowly begins to open up to them. She falls in love with Tenshi Kogai, a young-seeming boy living in the same building she lives in.

Soon, Rion learns that she made a contract with her adopted father, who was part of a clan of Devils that cannot bear children, injecting Devil DNA into her bloodstream. The devil part of her, went to sleep within Rion until her sixteenth birthday draws near. Rion's other persona is more seductive and aggressive than the real Rion, along with her cat-slits eyes.

After Tenshi lashed out at her, thinking that he was stuck in his child form because of her, Rion went to confront her father. Rion and her father agreed that if she had sex with one of her fiancés, he would return Tenshi to his true self. Scared, Rion told Tenshi what happened and then went off to ask Somi, one of her fiancés, to sleep with her. Before anything could happen, Tenshi broke it up, and asked Rion to come back to him.

Soon, the memories from his past restored him back to his original self. Somi still intended to sleep with Rion and the two boys got into a fight. After trying to figure out how to cure them of the Devil and Angels' DNA, Rion concluded that the only way to achieve this was to have sex with one of them.

Not wanting Rion to waste her first time on one of her fiancés, Tenshi dragged Rion to the room to sleep with her. Rion blacked out and her other persona took over. Tenshi managed to switch Rion back to her old self after telling the Devil Rion that he would still sleep with her because Rion is still Rion and frightening the real Rion. They figured out how to stop the shifts in her and her fiancés- have someone they love talk them back to themselves.

Rion hoped her fiancés would give up on her after learning this, but Somi, Fuuya, and Koki were even more determined to win her over, much to her and Tenshi's dismay.

Tenshi Kogai

Tenshi is a foul-mouthed, cigarette-smoking boy that takes the appearance of a young boy in the few first chapters. He is Rion's main love interest. Before the beginning of the story, Tenshi was raised in an orphanage called "Engaoka", along with Rion. At a young age, the two fell in love. However, a family came one day to adopt him and he left the orphanage, breaking Rion's heart. After years, he learned where Rion lived and went to see her, hoping to proclaim his love for her. However, along the way, he met Rion's adopted father. Realizing that Tenshi would get in the way, Rion's father erased all of Tenshi's memories of her and cursed him into his child form.

Believing him to be a disease, Tenshi's family resented him and he was forced to live by himself. When he first met Rion, having no memories of her from the past, he thought she was an annoying, stupid girl. After Rion saw his true, adult form, Tenshi believed that Rion held the key for his "disease" and soon began to date her, not caring that she was forced to pick a fiancé.

Later in the chapters, Tenshi realizes that he and Rion grew up together in the same orphanage after seeing a picture of Rion as a little girl and a boy that resembles himself. After confirming that the boy was him, Tenshi lashed out at Rion, blaming her for everything that happened.

After Rion explained that it was her father who trapped him in his child form and that Rion's father would change him back if she would sleep with one of her fiancés, Tenshi was shaken with guilt and went to stop her.

Later, he figured out that to stop the shifts in Rion and her fiancé was to have someone they love talk them out of it after he almost had sex with Rion. Hoping that would let Rion and himself be together, her fiancés were even more determined to win her heart, much to his dismay. But he truly loves Rion and they both want to be each other's first time.

Koki Sendo

Koki is one of Rion's three fiancés, along with his adopted brothers, Somi and Fuuya. Koki is definitely the most aggressive and gluttonous of the trio. Before the story took place, Koki wanted for money, so he made a blood contract his adopted father, an Angel. When Koki shifts into his other persona he becomes an aggressive womanizer and finds himself always broke.

He first encounters Rion when she was on her way from school, filthy and hungry. Thinking he was a pervert, she tried to get away from him until his brother Somi arrived and Rion got away. They met again when he and his brothers were properly introduced to her by Rion's father.

That same night, he tried to convince Rion to pick him, knowing how much she hates him and his brothers. It was then when he proved to Rion that he and his brothers weren't "devils": they revealed their angel's wings to Rion, who ran out of the room crying and scared.

After Rion witnesses Somi's sadistic other side, he comforts her and tells her about the Devil blood that runs through her. She did not believe him until he flew into the air and let her fall, letting that way her Devil's wings emerge from her back. After she fainted, he carried her back to her room.

Later, he skipped school one day and locked himself in his room, trying to suppress his other side. Rion came home, bringing Tenshi with her, and the two boys got into a fight. Afterwards, he left and told that Tenshi "reeks of Devil".

After Tenshi lashed out at Rion, blaming her for trapping him in his child form, Koki gives Rion some advice to confront her father if she wants to know what happened with Tenshi. After Rion's agreement with her father that he will change Tenshi back to his true form if she sleeps with one of her fiancés, Koki was not the one she picked, because she was scared of his aggressiveness.

He was seen again with his brothers when Rion and Tenshi tried to come up with a way to free him and his brothers from the Angel DNA. Seeing how to keep them from shifting by having someone they love talk them back to normal, Koki, along with his brothers, was more determined to win Rion's heart.

Fuuya Sendo

Fuuya is a model and delighted by many women. But when modeling he is usually in his other Persona, and doesn't enjoy his job that much. In fact, it would sometimes depress him. Especially when the pheromones released sex crazed men and woman to attack him. Fuuya tended to look like a cute girl when he cried to Rion, and was usually the one she felt most comfortable around.

When Fuuya hangs out with Rion they act as friends. But Fuuya knows the only way to be human is to take Rion's virginity, and the bad part is him and his brothers are slowly growing feelings for her.

Somi Sendo

Somi is probably the most favorited by Rion when it comes to which one to marry. Somi is the most aggressive about not shifting to his other persona, so bad he cuts himself. He constantly denies any feelings for Rion, and only wants her body so he can become human.

Throughout the manga, Somi shifts in front of Rion and becomes pretty aggressive usually, but hates himself after. He seems to usually be the head of the group and most sophisticated. And his enemy? Tenshi, because Rion loves him, and every time Somi might get to do her, Tenshi comes in and saves the day. Or destroys it in Somi's case.

Even though he won't admit it out loud, he has growing feelings for Rion that soon he won't be able to hide under that blank smirk.
