= Adekan =

Japanese manga series

- First volume cover

艶漢
- Genre: Historical, action, fantasy
- Manga
- Written by: Nao Tsukiji
- Published by: Shinshokan
- Magazine: Wings
- Original run: July 14, 2007 – present
- Volumes: 20

Adekan (Japanese: 艶漢, Hepburn: Adekan; lit. "Elegant Men") is a Japanese manga series written and illustrated by Nao Tsukiji. It began serialization in Wings on July 14, 2007. As of January 2021, twenty volumes have been published in Japan. The series had been licensed by JManga in America until the site closed down in 2013, Tong Li (東立) in China, and by Egmont Manga + Anime GmbH in Germany.

The series follows Shiro Yoshiwara, an eccentric umbrella craftsman, and Kojiro Yamada, a young police officer. The two form an unlikely bond and end up assisting one another with solving mysteries and stopping crime. However, Shiro's past eventually catches up with him, and threatens to harm his new-found friend and way of life.

A stage play was performed in Theater Sun Mall in Shinjuku from March 30 to April 3, 2016. Another stage adaptation ran from December 13 to 17 at the Haiyuza Theater. A series of Drama CDs were released by Shinkansha from 2011 to 2013.

== Plot ==
Shiro Yoshiwara owns a shop in the slum area of Gento where he lives and sells umbrellas of his creation. His umbrellas are more art pieces then anything practical, though, so he is often impoverished and starving. One day, police officer Kojiro Yamada comes to his shop looking for information about sightings of a phantom woman. Kojiro is shocked to find Shiro barely dressed and in the arms of a woman in the middle of the day (who is his neighbor and insists she too was only trying to "help" him dress). After questioning him and lecturing him about decency, Kojiro leaves to continue the investigation. It turns out Shiro was also investigating this same thing though and ends up being taken hostage by a local gang. Kojiro follows the sound of gunfire and attempts to "rescue" Shiro. Shiro suppresses the entire gang and ends up rescuing Kojiro, in the process revealing that he is an Anki (small hidden knives) user. Shiro is then surprised to find out that Kojiro doesn't intend to question or arrest him for this and the two go their separate ways, with the mystery now solved and the perpetrators dead or arrested.

Kojiro decides to return to the shop to teach Shiro about cooking and dressing properly. As the story progresses Shiro continues to assist Kojiro and the police force with solving various cases. He slowly opens up to Kojiro who continues to show up at his shop, introduce people to him, and invite him to different activities.

People from Shiro's past start showing up in the town and being the subjects of police cases. It is revealed that Shiro is from a country of super humans known only as The Group, which is unknown to the general public, and is a Superhuman, like most of The Group's inhabitants. He is also the "elixir of life" for The Group and his absence has resulted in people dying younger than normal. Shiro attempts to continue protecting his new friends and way of life but after a few close calls decides to leave town, believing his friends will be safe if he's gone, and settle the unfinished business from his past.

He journeys to The Group which is far away, hidden, and heavily guarded. Just as he enters, he realizes that Kojiro followed him. Unable to send Kojiro back, Shiro finds himself having to quickly teach Kojiro the rules and ways of The Group. The two of them are almost killed numerous times, but eventually find their way to Shiro's intended destination which is the home of his former fiancé, Touko. In the meantime, members of Gento's police force have teamed up with the military to attempt to locate and destroy The Group as they believe it is responsible for crimes and the kidnappings of a number of people.

== Media ==
=== Manga ===
Written and drawn by Nao Tsukiji, the chapters of Adekan have been serialized in the shōjo manga magazine Wings since its debut in the July 2007 issue. The first volume was released on September 1, 2008, and as of October 2025, twenty volumes have been released in Japan. Volumes 1 and 2 were published digitally in English by (now defunct) JManga in 2011. Volumes 1–10 have been licensed and published in Chinese by Tong Li Publishing Co., Ltd. Volumes 1–9 have been licensed and published in German by Egmont Manga + Anime GmbH since 2011. The series is currently ongoing.

A special edition box set consisting of volumes 1–12 went on sale in June 2016.

=== Drama CDs ===
A series of Drama CDs were released by Shinkansha from 2011 to 2013. The Japanese voice acting cast includes Jun Fukuyama as Shiro, Maeno Tomoaki as Kojiro, Takahiro Sakurai as Anri, as well as Takuya Sato, Kei Shindo, Nobuo Tobita, and Saki Fujita.

=== Stage plays ===
There have been two stage plays, both performed in Theater Sun Mall (Tokyo, Japan). The first was written and directed by Hosaka You. The second was written and directed by Ise Naohiro. The cast included Sakurai Keito as Shiro, Suehara Takuma as Kojiro, Mikami Shun as Anri, and Horikoshi Ryou as Saotome.

A third stage play, written and directed by Hosaka You, was performed at the Theater Sun Mall (Tokyo, Japan) from April 20 to 29, 2019.
