= La Esperança =

Japanese manga series

- Cover of volume 1 (DMP Edition)

エスペランサ (Esuperansa)
- Genre: Shōnen-ai, drama, tragedy.
- Manga
- Written by: Chigusa Kawai
- Published by: Shinshokan
- Magazine: Wings
- Original run: November 2000 – 2006
- Volumes: 7

La Esperança (エスペランサ, Esuperansa; "Hope") is a shounen-ai manga series written and illustrated by Chigusa Kawai. It has been published in the United States by Digital Manga Publishing in 2005. Original ran was from November 2000 to 2006.

== Plot ==
Georges Saphir has spent his whole life trying to be the opposite of what his father was and has worked himself to the bone to become the perfect student, beloved by everyone in Saint Grollo Boys' School.

It works, until that Robert Jade, a rebellious and attractive new student comes into the picture and begins to turn Georges' belief system upside-down. While Georges tries hard to get along with everyone, Robert doesn't care who he annoys. Compelled to shatter Georges' angelic image, Robert can't help but test the younger boy's faith and innocence, which he both hates and admires.

However, Georges and Robert are more similar than they realize, and are soon berated by jealous and protective classmates, yet the two find themselves forming a friendship that will transform them both.

== Characters ==
Georges Saphir
Georges is an angel-faced do-gooder student at an all-boys' religious academy. He is known for his kind-heart, soft voice and angelic manners. He is always surrounded by friends, though seems to keep most distanced to an extent. Until Robert shows up and confronts him, Georges keeps his pain confined inside himself about his reasons and true nature. Robert finally draws out of him that Georges doesn't want to be hated, and we learn by the end of the first volume that he is like that because he doesn't want to be a shadow of his father, who was well known for being a cruel and malicious man.
Robert Jade
Robert is an enigmatic and handsome transfer student to the academy. He seems to have a hobby for harassing Georges. He draws out a lot of hidden emotions and feelings from the blond in his malicious trouble-making. But Robert also is revealed to have a dark past of his own when Alain, an enemy from the past, draws out old memories of a lost love whose death is blamed on Robert. This person was an angelic, pure sort, just like Georges. Robert is the son of the academy's principal.
Henri Quartz
Henri is one of Georges better friends and seems to often appear around the blond. They hang together and attend classes together, though, like everyone else, Georges still draws a line between the two of them. Henri seems defensive over Georges and openly is suspicious and confrontational toward Robert about his harassing Georges.
Sir Freddy
Frederic is a royal figure who is held in high-regards because of his silver hair. Though this has spoiled him, it has also crushed him, causing him to be cold and alone. He is set up to be "official friends" with Georges by his father and the principal. This affects Georges negatively, since Freddy has taken him in as a gopher-boy, too. But after Georges proves himself as a true, genuine friend-potential, Freddy accepts him and they actually become friends. He often confronts Robert when he is "harassing" Georges and seems jealous and territorial.
