= The Demon Ororon =

Japanese manga series by Hakase Mizuki

- Cover of the first Japanese volume of The Demon Ororon

悪魔のオロロン (Akuma no Ororon)
- Genre: Dark fantasy, romance
- Manga
- Written by: Hakase Mizuki
- Published by: Shinshokan
- English publisher: NA: Tokyopop
- Magazine: Wings
- Original run: April 1998 – January 2001
- Volumes: 4
- Manga

Empire of Midnight
- Written by: Hakase Mizuki
- Published by: Shinshokan
- Magazine: Wings
- Published: 2007
- Volumes: 1

The Demon Ororon (Japanese: 悪魔のオロロン, Hepburn: Akuma no Ororon) is a Japanese manga series written and illustrated by Hakase Mizuki. The manga was licensed in North America by Tokyopop. The epilogue to the series, Empire of Midnight (真夜中の帝国, Mayonaka no Teikoku) had six chapters released as of 2007.

== Plot ==
When Chiaki meets a wounded young man on the street and offers to take him in, she has no idea that she's just invited the King of Hell to move in with her. Out of gratitude for helping him, Ororon offers to grant Chiaki one wish. Chiaki, who lives a very lonely life, asks Ororon to stay with her forever. Remarking that "forever" is not the same for each of them, Ororon agrees, and the two of them quickly become attached to each other. Unfortunately, Chiaki soon realizes that falling in love with a demon has consequences. Ororon has abandoned his throne, causing renegade demons, bounty hunters, and his own brothers to come after him to take his crown. As Ororon fights to stay alive and protect the girl he loves, Chiaki is appalled by the violence surrounding her, and condemns Ororon as a murderer. Their relationship remains strained throughout the series as Ororon attempts to refrain from killing for Chiaki's sake, leaving himself open for attack in the process. However, when her friends are threatened Chiaki herself displays a horrifying power. The powers her angelic father sealed within her level an entire city during a battle with several bounty hunters, and Chiaki spends the rest of the series in agony over her hatred of what she and Ororon must do to survive.

== Characters ==
=== Main ===
- Chiaki Saionji is the heroine, a shy and pacifistic girl who is the daughter of the Archangel Michael and a human woman. She is a boyish-looking, extensively cheery 15-year-old girl. Her parents disappeared when she was a baby, and she was raised by her grandfather, who has recently died. Her mixed heritage gives her incredible powers and makes her a target for both angels and demons. When she unlocks her powers she unleashes a devastating explosion that levels the city.
- Ororon Gem Farrell is the King of Hell, but he has abandoned his post and fled to Earth. He is a mysterious figure and is usually seen wearing all black with a smug look plastered on his face. The seventh and youngest son of the previous king, he has no wish to rule Hell and prefers to remain with Chiaki. For her sake he tries to temper his bloodthirsty nature, a constant source of stress on their relationship.

=== Secondary ===
- Lika is Chiaki's best (and only) friend who moves in with her. Shiro asks her if she is in love with Othello, she neither admits it or denies it, and it is also hinted that she has feelings toward Shiro.
- Shiro and Kuro are two demon-cat brothers who are killed by Ororon after they attack Chiaki. At Chiaki's pleading, Ororon restores them to life and they are "adopted" by Chiaki.
- Othello is the fifth son of the previous King of Hell, General of the Army of Hell, and one of the most powerful creatures in the multi-verse (at one point he is referred to as one of the top three who can "kill anything and anyone"). He makes a vow to protect Ororon after Ororon tries to convince their father, Ozu, not to have Othello's wife (Futaba) executed. Of all Ororon's siblings, he is the only one who cares for Ororon. Othello comes to Earth in search of Ororon, and while at first he attempts to convince Ororon to return to Hell, he seems content to remain on Earth with Ororon and Chiaki. He becomes infatuated with the bounty-hunter Mitsume, in whom he sees much of himself. Othello is constantly joking and laughing, but his smile hides a deep inner pain.
- Mitsume is a bounty hunter. Because he was born with a third eye, an "evil eye", he was mutilated (losing an arm and two fingers) and driven from his village. Since then, he's been wandering around as a professional Bounty Hunter. Othello wants him as a plaything, but he remains defiant. Othello repeatedly beats and goads him in an attempt to give him a purpose for living. From then on, Mitsume makes his life's goal to train so that he can kill Othello.
- Oscar Farrel is Ororon and Othello's half-brother, the third prince, and Ororon's chief rival for the throne of Hell. He has a bittersweet disdain/hatred for the king and is very merciless in his actions. He tries to take over the world, starting with hell, and confronts Ororon in the final battle of the series.
- Yotsuba Farrel is Othello's son by his late wife, Futaba. He refuses to call Othello "father", even though Othello asks him to. His relationship with his father seems strained, but relatively normal. He is commander of the 1st battalion of Hell's army.
- Miss Lucy is Ororon's maid. She is shown to have abnormal strength. It is unknown whether she is human or demon or some other manner of creature.
- Minister Charles Crodel is one of Ororon's advisers, and the most important political figure in Hell, tasked with the daily operations of running the kingdom.
- Minister Shinichiro Tachibana is another adviser to Ororon. Tachibana, Charles, and Yotsuba lead the group that follows Othello to Earth in an attempt to convince Ororon to return to Hell.
- Sheila is Ororon's mother, who lost her sanity due to an attempted poisoning. She hates Ororon, because he reminds her of his father; King Ozu had Sheila's lover, Gem, killed so that she would become his mistress. She tries to kill Ororon, though because he loves her, he visits her regardless.
- Ozu is Ororon's father and King of Hell. He chose Ororon as his heir, though Ororon was the youngest son and mistress-born, because of his obsessive love for Sheila.
- Olga is one of the seven princes of Hell, though his age is unknown. He leads an attack on Hell's capital city while Oscar attacks Ororon on Earth. Shinichiro Tachibana states that he does so on Oscar's command, though it's unclear if they are working together. Due to their rivalry, it is unlikely that any of the seven brothers could ever get along well enough to work together.

== Manga ==
Shinshokan published the manga's 4 bound volumes between April 1999 and March 2001. Tokyopop published the manga's 4 bound volumes between April 6, 2004, and October 12, 2004. Tokyopop compiled the volumes into The Demon Ororon: The Complete Collection, which was released on December 18, 2007.

=== Volume list ===
No.	Original release date	Original ISBN	North America release date	North America ISBN
1	April 1999	978-4-40-361539-9	April 6, 2004	978-1-59-182725-2
01. "Ororon the Devil"; 02. "Angel vs. Devil"; 03. "The Price on His Head"; 04. "Recollections"/"Memory"; 05. "Battle in Broad Daylight"/"Death to the King of Devils"
2	October 1999	978-4-40-361565-8	June 15, 2004	978-1-59-182726-9
06. "Sunset"; 07. "Reason to Live"; 08. "Reunion"; 09. "Night"; 10. "Ticket to Paradise"
3	March 2000	978-4-40-361591-7	August 3, 2004	978-1-59-182727-6
11. "Awakening"; 12. "Strange Loyalty"; 13. "Black Flame"; 14. "Holy Spirit of the Highest Rank and Office"; 15. "Breaking the Circle"; "Be My Baby"; "Raison d'être"
4	March 2001	978-4-40-361623-5	October 12, 2004	978-1-59-182728-3
16. "Long Night" Parts I–VI

== Reception ==
A reviewer at Pop Shock Culture commended the manga for its balance of "Tarantino-esque ultraviolence" and "shoujo-channeling relationship of the two core protagonists". Greg Hackmann at Mania.com and IGN's A.E. Sparrow criticises the artist for drawing the characters " too similar in appearance".
