= Eerie Queerie! =

Japanese manga series by Shuri Shiozu

- Cover of the first volume of the series, as published by Tokyopop

ゴースト! (Gōsuto!)
- Genre: Comedy, supernatural
- Manga
- Written by: Shuri Shiozu
- Published by: Shinshokan
- English publisher: NA: Tokyopop; (expired)
- Imprint: Wings Comics
- Magazine: Wings
- Original run: 1999 – 2003
- Volumes: 4

Eerie Queerie!, titled Ghost! (ゴースト!, Gōsuto!) in the original Japanese, is a four-volume manga series written and illustrated by Shuri Shiozu. It was published by Shinshokan under the Wings Comics imprint from 1999 to 2003. The series was licensed in English by Tokyopop in 2004, though it went out of print when the company closed its North American publishing division in 2011.

== Plot ==
The series centers around Mitsuo Shiozu, a lonely high school student who has the psychic ability to see "spirits" who can use him to interact and communicate with the living world for a purpose. These purposes usually don't go very well for Mitsuo, but the spirits seem to be able to do what they need to do to move on. They also lead Mitsuo to quite a few admirers – of the male sex. The story is mostly lighthearted, and much of its humor comes from the awkward and embarrassing situations and misunderstandings the characters find themselves in. The manga itself is shōnen-ai yet also a parody of shōnen-ai storylines and stereotypes.

== Characters ==
Mitsuo Shiozu (四方津 光男, Shiotsu Mitsuo)
The main character of Eerie Queerie, Mitsuo Shiozu is a high school student with special abilities: he can interact with ghosts. Unfortunately, this can work against him, as it leaves him vulnerable to being possessed by ghosts who frequently use his body to fulfill their means. The resulting exploits make up much of the humor in the series. Besides attracting ghosts, Mitsuo inadvertently attracts the attentions of the guys around him, and his naïveté only enhances his appeal in their eyes. He develops a crush on Hasunuma as the story progresses, but doesn't realize it consciously. However, Mitsuo becomes incredibly violent and protective whenever someone else flirts with Hasunuma. Mitsuo's character is a parody on a stereotypical uke character. Throughout the manga he tries to prove his masculinity, without succeeding.
Hasunuma (蓮沼)
In volume one, Mitsuo is possessed by the ghost of a girl, Kiyomi, who, in her lifetime, had a crush on Hasunuma and regrets having never told him. Kiyomi uses Mitsuo's body to make her feelings known to Hasunuma. Of course, his classmates think that it is in fact Mitsuo himself professing his love to Hasunuma, and decide he must be gay (a belief that Mitsuo fights against in vain). Hasunuma, however, apparently realizes the truth of the matter, and dispels the ghost from Mitsuo's body by using charm cards. He turns out to have a decent amount of knowledge about spirits, and therefore proves useful in helping Mitsuo. Hasunuama is a parody on seme a stereotype in shōnen-ai stories.
Unknown to Mitsuo (for the majority of the series), Hasunuma is interested in Mitsuo, and looks out for him, once even jumping out of an upstairs window to save him and later crossdressing to protect Mitsuo's reputation. Mitsuo also begins to have feelings for Hasunuma, but attempts to hide them out of fear, uncertainty, and his own fabricated reason of concern for Hasunuma's "feelings".
At the end of the series there is a gag comic that refers to the fact that Hasunuma's full name has never been revealed. When he attempts to inform Mitsuo of his full name, Hasunuma's attempts are bleeped out as if he was being censored for bad language. The other characters theorize that his name must be something naughty while Hasunuma asserts that his name is not anything bad and is just a normal name.
Ichi Shirai
Ichi is a fellow student at Mitsuo's school, introduced in volume one. He is haunted by his past, and believes himself a murderer because when he played soccer one time, he kicked his ball out into the road. Ichi's secret crush, Natsuko, ran after it to pick it up, and was run over by a truck while attempting to do so. Ichi continues to blame himself for Natsuko's death until Natsuko herself returns as a ghost through Mitsuo, to Ichi, telling him that she forgives him, and entreats him to stop feeling guilty and start playing soccer again. After this, Ichi becomes friends with Mitsuo, and later develops a crush on him. Because of this, he is a rival of Hasunuma's and the two regard each other with suspicion.
Hibiki Kanau
Kanau is a ghost haunting Mitsuo's high school. He had a tragic death, in which he and his senpai had agreed on committing a double suicide by jumping off a bridge. However, at the last moment, his senpai could not bring himself to do this, and turned away, but by this time Kanau had already jumped.
Kanau is very jealous of Hasunuma's intense love for Mitsuo; the sort of love he was denied in his lifetime. Kanau manages to push Mitsuo out of an upstairs window, but is shocked and guilty when Hasunuma, fearing for Mitsuo, jumps out as well. Eventually, Kanau becomes somewhat of a pet for Mikuni.
Mikuni
Mikuni is the chief priest at a Shinto temple who makes his debut in volume two. He possesses incredible spiritual powers and is very arrogant. Mikuni is also the source of much tension as he uses Mitsuo's naïveté to make Hasunuma and even Ichi jealous. At one point, Hasunuma, in spirit form, was Mikuni's servant until he was replaced by Kanau when he returned to his body. Mikuni is the most open of the characters because he makes it clear that his interest lies in boys.
Itsuki
Itsuki makes his debut in volume three, first appearing to the group when is found half-unconscious outside the shrine. He is a spiritual medium, a profession passed down from his family. His mother, who had died the week before, had been a shrine maiden, and had graduated as a koto player. His late father used to possess his body so he and his mother could speak to each other again. Mikuni attempts to further Itsuki's powers by trying to allow God to possess his body, though it ends in disaster. At one point, he explains through thought that his mother would always have this strange look in her eye that Shino later portrays.
Shino
Shino also first appears in volume three, as Mikuni's new shrine maiden. He doesn't speak to anyone, and he's constantly giving rather "strange" looks towards Itsuki. Later, Shino saves Itsuki when a desk almost falls on his head when Itsuki and Mikuni try to medium God, in the process giving himself a head injury. Itsuki carries Shino out of the "shrine of chaos", as all sorts of things flew around, and they ended up in the forest, where Shino kisses him, and speaks for the first time. Later, it is discovered that Shino was "stalking" Itsuki since the ninth grade, and the whole mute thing was part of his plan to intrigue Itsuki.

== Volumes ==
No.	Original release date	Original ISBN	English release date	English ISBN
1	March 25, 1999	978-4-403-61535-1	March 9, 2004	978-1-59182-719-1
2	February 24, 2000	978-4-403-61576-4	May 11, 2004	978-1-59182-720-7
3	November 22, 2001	978-4-403-61650-1	July 6, 2004	978-1-59182-721-4
4	April 24, 2003	978-4-403-61710-2	September 14, 2004	978-1-59182-861-7

== Reception ==
Critical reception for the series was mixed to positive, with AnimeFringe's Maria Lin calling the first volume "entertaining" and "worth the low price". Anime News Network's Liann Cooper called the series' second volume "fun" but noted that "a series cannot survive on fanservice alone". Of the series' later volumes, Cooper said that in volume three "the series has picked itself back up" but that the conclusion of Eerie Queerie! in volume four was unsatisfying.
