= Vampire Game =

Japanese manga series

吸血遊戯 (Kyūketsu Yūgi)
- Genre: Comedy, Fantasy, Romance
- Manga
- Written by: Judal
- Published by: Shinshokan
- English publisher: AUS: Madman Entertainment; NA: Tokyopop
- Magazine: Wings
- Original run: November 1996 – November 2004
- Volumes: 15

Vampire Game (吸血遊戯, Kyūketsu Yūgi) is a manga by the Japanese author and artist, Judal. It originally ran in the monthly manga magazine Wings, with its last chapter serialized in the November 2004 issue. The series has 15 volumes in all. It was licensed in the U.S. by Tokyopop.

== The story ==
One hundred years ago, Vampire King Duzell led a war against the humans and kingdom of Pheliosta, simply because he was bored. In the epic last battle, King Phelios defeated Duzell by using a powerful spell that uses the caster's life force as a weapon to destroy the enemy, but kills the caster in the process. As both lay dying, Duzell swore that they would be reborn in a century's time, and he would find Phelios' reincarnation and kill him.

Ninety-nine and a half years later, Duzell's spirit approaches a wildcat called a kyawl, offering a partnership, as the kyawl's kittens had been killed and the she-cat was seeking revenge on those who tormented them. Unfortunately, the kyawl killed an innocent man in the process, leaving a little boy, Roy, fatherless. The kyawl tells Duzell after she avenges her kittens, she would give birth to a son, and Duzell could take refuge in his body; however, she would sacrifice herself to stop the cycle of revenge.

Princess Ishtar of Pheliosta, great-granddaughter of Phelios, becomes caught up in the plot when the villagers attacked by the kyawl bring a report of the event. Since kyawls are not carnivores, the attack looks like vampirism. While the matter is dismissed by Ishtar's advisor, Sir Keld, Ishtar takes off to investigate in disguise as a holy knight, bringing the Phelios bloodline's heirloom sword Sidia. As a result, her bodyguard, Captain Darres, chases after her.

Ishtar encounters Roy after his father was found dead, and as she gets the story, Duzell sees Sidia, and tell the kyawl that he needs to taste Ishtar's blood in order to see if she's Phelios's reincarnation. He attempts to attack her, but Darres shows up and kills the kyawl. In her dying moments, the kyawl gives birth to a kitten that houses Duzell's soul. With Roy not wanting revenge on the kitten, the cycle of hate is ended, and Ishtar adopts Duzell as a pet, even after he bites her (and incidentally discovers she's not Phelios' reincarnation). This leads to the kitten being named Duzell.

Duzell recovers some of his powers and uses the taste of Ishtar's blood to become a male doppelganger of her, taking her place while the Princess is playing hooky. In an attempt to find out how many descendants Phelios has, and who they are, Duzell attempts to use a spell of truth on Ishtar's tutor, Yujinn, but it backfires when Yujinn manages to repel him and reveal Duzell's not human. Duzell escapes, only to run into Ishtar, who accepts the situation with remarkable aplomb and keeps up the charade as well, though it's doubtful how many people they fool.

Once Ishtar has a moment to speak with Duzell in private, she tells him she'll look out for him, as she has very few people to genuinely care for and who genuinely care for her. Despite not earning or deserving her trust, Duzell confesses his true identity as the Vampire King, only for Ishtar to offer her help in his quest. Since Ishtar has her own grudges against the monarchy, a burden she doesn't want for various reasons, she tells Duzell the perfect place to begin: a fighting competition is going to be held in the neighboring La Naan, where Ishtar has an aunt and three cousins.

== Characters ==
=== Main Character ===
Ishtar – Princess Ishtar is only fifteen years old and controls the throne of Pheliosta due to her parents' deaths earlier in her childhood. Defiant and stubborn, Ishtar gets what she wants and is known for running away and causing trouble. Though loyal to a fault, she often hurts situations more than she helps, which Duzell or Darres have to fix. Ishtar is in love with Darres and would cast La Gamme for him – the very spell Phelios cast to destroy Duzell at the cost of his life, eventually she marries Darres and at the age of 20 gave birth to two boys.

Duzell – The dreaded Vampire King. When he was still alive, before his battle with Phelios, Duzell struck fear into every heart, human and vampire alike. He was quite cruel and began "world domination" because he was bored with his immortality. Now, in his reincarnation, he has been considerably softened by Ishtar. Though his true form is a kyawl (a cat-like creature) he is able to change into any being from whom he draws blood. Eventually he becomes strong enough to take on his original vampire form. When in this form, Duzell masquerades as Ishtar's doctor. later he used "La Gamme" killing both Lassen and himself. Five years later he reincarnated into one of Ishtar's son.

Darres – Ishtar's 27-year-old bodyguard who was first employed ten years ago, when he was seventeen and she was five. He is a master swordsman. He often has to chase Ishtar when she runs away or tries to fix things she has screwed up. He is actually quite dense to many things (especially women) and is oblivious to Ishtar's deep love for him.

Yujinn – Yujinn is actually Ishtar's cousin Yuujel masquerading as her spell tutor. He is known to be quite the ladies' man but also flirts with men and, possibly, Ishtar's kyawl. Lucy suggested that Yuujin is quite taken with Ishtar that he would put himself on the line for her. Though he shown affection towards Ishtar, he constantly tries to put Darres and Ishtar together. by the end of the story he was killed. even when he is taking his last breath, he shown desire to be with Ishtar and Darres (in a none romantic way). Also he is one of the few that discovered Duzell being Ishtar's kyawl.

Sharlen – The Vampire Marquis. He has used his mother's face and name as an alias to hide his true identity, while bargaining with a mortal. He thinks that Ishtar is Phelios' reincarnation. He hates Duzell because his mother chose to sacrifice herself to get revenge on Duzell by helping Phelios. Sharlen is ultimately uncertain on who Phelios' reincarnation is so he helps Lassen start a war in hopes that all the descendants of Phelios will be killed.

=== Phelios's Descendants ===
==== The Royal House of La Naan ====
Queen Ramia – Ishtar's hot-tempered widowed aunt and queen of La Naan. Ramia is bent on getting one of her sons on the throne by any means, even if it means setting one son against the other.

Vord – Third and youngest prince of La Naan Vord would be considered the "heart-throb" of La Naan for his blonde hair, tan skin, and muscular stature.

Laphiji – Laphiji is the middle son and the quiet one of the three. He is rarely seen with a smile and is often called creepy by several of the other characters.

Seiliez – The First, and eldest, of the three princes of La Naan. Seiliez is actually quite gorgeous being the pretty boy that he is.

==== The Royal House of Ci Xeneth ====
Jened – Ishtar's uncle and king of Ci Xeneth.He conducts secret experiments to create ruelles from the souls of monsters. He is Falan's father.

Falan – Ishtar's cousin. Falan is a sweet girl and is one of the only relatives who Ishtar is fond of.

Illsaide – Nicknamed "The Holy Warrior". He is a taciturn and powerful fighter who is adept in all types of magic. He is the illegitimate child of Jened and half brother of Falan, whom he loved.

==== The Royal House of Zi Alda ====
Sonia – Ishtar's favorite aunt and queen of Zi Alda. A nice woman who succeeded in marrying outside of the family and has one son, Yuujel. she was one of the first person to see Duzell in his true form, and received Duzell's treatment, but eventually dies.

Yuujel – The prince of Zi Alda, also known as Yujinn. He left Zi Alda to become Ishtar's tutor one year ago. His best friend is Ashley, and Leene is in love with him although he does not return her feelings. Ashley and Leene are married also.

==== The Royal House of Mil Seii ====
Lassen – The illegitimate Duke of Mil Seii. He wants to rule Pheliosta, and killing Ishtar is part of his plan. His holy magic abilities and his years of studying poisons have made him one of the most powerful members of Phelios' bloodline. It's rumored that he poisoned his own parents. He despises Duzell and is in love with a sorcerer known as Lailis, because Lailis was the only one who showed him kindness in his youth.

Lailis- Queen of the doomed land Lodoc. She is held captive by Lassen and is not introduced until book 11.

== Other Works by Judal ==
Carbuncle, Diva, Makai sangokushi CHIMAERA, Nerva shinjuuki, Nighteye (Night Eye), and Yoru no Hitomi (published by Bonita Comics)
