= Dragon Fist (manga) =

Japanese manga by Shuu Katayama

- Cover of the first volume

ドラゴンフィスト (Doragon Fisuto)
- Genre: Fantasy, Martial arts
- Manga
- Written by: Shu Katayama
- Published by: Shinshokan
- Magazine: Wings
- Original run: 1988 – 2005
- Volumes: 14
- Original video animation
- Directed by: Shigeyasu Yamauchi
- Produced by: Hiroshi Tasaki; Tamaki Harada
- Music by: Kenji Kawai
- Studio: Agent 21
- Released: March 20, 1991
- Runtime: 40 minutes

Dragon Fist (Japanese: ドラゴンフィスト, Hepburn: Doragon Fisuto) is a manga series written and illustrated by Shu Katayama. It was serialized in the Shinshokan magazine Wings from 1988 to 2005.

A one-shot original video animation (OVA) anime based on the manga was released on March 20, 1991.

== Plot ==
The series follows Ling Fei-long, a Chinese transfer student living in Japan. Ling is the son of the leader of the White Dragon clan, one of four clans who live in the mountains of China and are descended from mythical beasts. After killing an ordinary human, Ling is banished to Japan so that he might learn about humanity and how to control his powers around them.

== Volumes ==
Dragon Fist has been released in tankōbon and bunkobon form.

=== Tankōbon ===
1. ISBN 978-4-403-61160-5. Released in June 1988.
2. ISBN 978-4-403-61196-4. Released in June 1989.
3. ISBN 978-4-403-61271-8. Released in November 1991.
4. ISBN 978-4-403-61299-2. Released in January 1993.
5. ISBN 978-4-403-61328-9. Released in October 1993.
6. ISBN 978-4-403-61371-5. Released in October 1994.
7. ISBN 978-4-403-61390-6. Released in July 1995.
8. ISBN 978-4-403-61411-8. Released in March 1996.
9. ISBN 978-4-403-61465-1. Released in June 1997.
10. ISBN 978-4-403-61498-9. Released in May 1998.
11. ISBN 978-4-403-61533-7. Released in February 1999.
12. ISBN 978-4-403-61608-2. Released in October 2000.
13. ISBN 978-4-403-61776-8. Released in November 2004.
14. ISBN 978-4-403-61794-2. Released in May 2005.

=== Bunkobon ===
1. ISBN 978-4-403-50094-7. Released in April 2007.
2. ISBN 978-4-403-50095-4. Released in April 2007.
3. ISBN 978-4-403-50096-1. Released in May 2007.
4. ISBN 978-4-403-50097-8. Released in May 2007.
5. ISBN 978-4-403-50098-5. Released in June 2007.
6. ISBN 978-4-403-50099-2. Released in June 2007.
7. ISBN 978-4-403-50100-5. Released in July 2007.
8. ISBN 978-4-403-50101-2. Released in July 2007.
