= Wings (Japanese magazine) =

Japanese manga magazine

- Cover of the magazine's June 1984 issue
- Categories: Shōjo manga
- Frequency: Bi-monthly
- Circulation: 250,000
- Founded: 1982
- Company: Shinshokan
- Country: Japan
- Based in: Tokyo
- Language: Japanese
- Website: Official Website

Wings (Japanese: ウィングス, Hepburn: Uingusu) is a shōjo manga magazine published by Shinshokan. Published bi-monthly, it features action and fantasy manga aimed at women in the age group of 16–20 years. Headquartered in Tokyo, the magazine previously had the following editions namely Shinshokan South (a.k.a. South), Phantom Club, Huckleberry, Un Poco and Wings: Story; however, currently, only Un Poco and Wings:Story are still being published.

At its inception, Wings established itself as a science fiction and fantasy magazine. Its more fantastical settings and sense of wonder helped it to stand out, and Wings began to accept stories from a diverse mix of genres. Due to its high popularity with female readers, in the mid-2010s the magazine began using the tagline "Shōjo Manga for Adults".

== Serializations ==
=== Current ===
- PALM (manga) by Yasay Kemonogi (1983–present)
- Tatakau! Sebastian by Kan Ikeda (2002–present)
- Hyakushō Kizoku by Hiromu Arakawa (2006–present)
- Adekan by Tsukiji Nao (2007–present)
- Kase-san and Yamada by Hiromi Takashima (2017–present)

=== Former ===
1980s

- Dragon Fist by Shu Katayama (1988–2005)
- Earthian by Yun Kōga (1988–1994)
- RG Veda by Clamp (1989–1996)

1990s

- Dragon Knights by Mineko Ohkami (1990–2007)
- Tokyo Babylon by Clamp (1990–1993)
- Sanban-chō Hagiwara-ya no Bijin by Keiko Nishi (1991-2000)
- Hidarite by Clamp (1994)
- The Young Magician by Yuri Narushima (1995–2016)
- Vampire Game by Judal (1996–2004)
- Liling-Po by Ako Yutenji (1997-2006)
- The Day of Revolution by Mikiyo Tsuda (1998–2001)
- The Demon Ororon by Hakase Mizuki (1998–2001)
- Antique Bakery by Fumi Yoshinaga (1999–2002)
- Eerie Queerie! by Shuri Shiozu (1999–2003)
- Garden Dreams by Fumi Yoshinaga (1999)
- Immortal Rain by Kaori Ozaki (1999–2011)
- Weiß Kreuz Verbrechen & Strafe by Takehito Koyasu and Kyoko Tsuchiya (1997–1998)

2000s

- Cafe Kichijoji de by Yuki Miyamoto and Kyoko Negishi (2000–2002)
- Stigma by Kazuya Minekura (2000)
- La Esperança by Chigusa Kawai (2000–2006)
- Black Sun, Silver Moon by Tomo Maeda (2001–2006)
- The Devil Within by Ryō Takagi (2002–2004)
- Princess Princess by Mikiyo Tsuda (2002–2006)
- Train Train by Eiki Eiki (2002–2005)
- Baku by Hakase Mizuki (2003)
- Demon Flowers by Hakase Mizuki (2004–2006)
- Flower of Life by Fumi Yoshinaga (2004–2007)
- Princess Ai by Courtney Love, D.J. Milky, Ai Yazawa, and Misaho Kujiradou (2004–2005)
- Princess Princess + by Mikiyo Tsuda (2006–2007)
- Alice the 101st by Chigusa Kawai (2007–2015)
- Empire of Midnight by Hakase Mizuki (2007)
- Happy Boys by Makoto Tateno (2007–2008)

== See also ==
- Dear+, boys' love (BL) companion magazine to Wings
