= Shinshokan =

Japanese publishing company

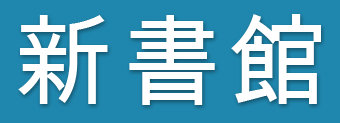
- Native name: 株式会社新書館
- Romanized name: Kabushiki-gaisha Shinshokan
- Company type: KK
- Industry: Publishing, media
- Genre: Shōjo, yaoi
- Founded: June 14, 1961; 65 years ago
- Founder: Masashi Miura
- Headquarters: Bunkyo, Tokyo, Japan
- Products: Books, manga, magazines, music, video
- Website: www.shinshokan.co.jp

Shinshokan (株式会社新書館, Kabushiki-gaisha Shinshokan) is a Japanese publishing company. It was established on June 14, 1961. In April 2009, the US publisher Digital Manga Publishing announced a co-branding operation with Shinshokan, to license yaoi and shōjo manga from Shinshokan's Wings, Dear, and Dear+ anthologies under the DokiDoki imprint (the name being Japanese onomatopoeia for a heartbeat).

== Manga magazines ==
- Cheri+
- Dear+
- Wings

=== Defunct magazines ===
- Hirari,
- Huckleberry
- Kaguya
- South
- Un Poco
- BOY'S JAM!
