= Abada =

Abada may refer to:

- Abada (surname), a French surname
- Abada (rhinoceros), kept by Philip II of Spain
- Abada (unicorn), a type of unicorn reported to live in the lands of the African Congo
- Äbädä, a forest spirit in Tatar mythology
- Abadá, an item of clothing
- ABADÁ-Capoeira, a non-profit organization whose purpose is to spread and support Brazilian culture through the practice of Capoeira
- Tell Abada, an archaeological site in Iraq

== See also ==
- Aba (disambiguation)
- Abadan (disambiguation)
- Abaddon (disambiguation)
- Abaya, type of clothing
