= Abadan (surname) =

Abadan is a Turkish surname. Notable people with the name include:

- Ayşegül Abadan (born 1980), Turkish pianist
- Faridoon Abadan (born 1946), Pakistani politician
- Nermin Abadan Unat (1921–2025), Turkish lawyer
- Oğuz Abadan (born 1950), Turkish musician

== See also ==
- Abadan (disambiguation)
