= Freydun (given name) =

Freydun (Persian: فریدون; from the Avestan Θraētaona), is an Iranian masculine given name. Common variations include the names Freidun, Feridun, Faridun, Faredoon, Fereydoon, Ferydoon, Faridoon, Ferydoun, Fereydoun and Fereydun.

== Etymology ==
All of the forms of the name shown above derive, by regular sound laws, from Proto-Iranian Thraetaona (Θraētaona) and Proto-Indo-Iranian Traitaunas.

Traitaunas is a derivative (with augmentative suffix -una/-auna) of Tritas, the name of a deity or hero reflected in the Vedic Trita and the Avestan Thrita (Θrita). Both names are identical to the adjective meaning "the third", a term used of a minor deity associated with two other deities to form a triad. In the Indian Vedas, Trita is associated with gods of thunder and wind.

Trita is also called Aptya (Āptya), a name that is probably cognate with Athwiya (Āθβiya), the name of father of Thraetaona in the Avestā. Traitaunas may therefore be interpreted as "the great son of the deity Tritas". The name was borrowed from Parthian into Armenian as Hrudēn.

== Notable people ==
=== Freydun or Freidun ===
- Freidun Aghalyan (1876–1994), Armenian architect
- Freydun Atturaya (1891–1926), Assyrian physician

=== Feridun or Faridun ===
- Feridun Ahmed Bey (died 1583), Ottoman official, bureaucrat, author and military officer
- Feridun Aybars (born 1952), Turkish swimmer
- Feridun Bilgin (born 1964), Turkish civil servant and politician, former Minister of Transport, Maritime and Communication
- Feridun Buğeker (1933–2014), Turkish football player
- Feridun Cemal Erkin (1899–1980), Turkish diplomat and politician
- Feridun Düzağaç (born 1968), Turkish singer
- Feridun Hamdullahpur (born 1953/54), Turkish-Canadian academic
- Feridun Karakaya (1922–2004), Turkish comedy actor
- Faridun Muhiddinov, Tajikistani engineer and politician
- Faridun Nahar Laili (born 1954), Bangladeshi politician
- Feridun Sinirlioğlu (born 1956), Turkish diplomat and civil servant
- Feridun Sungur (born 1984), Turkish football player
- Feridun Zaimoğlu (born 1964), German author and visual artist of Turkish origin

=== Faridoon or Faredoon ===
- Faridoon Abadan (1946–????), Pakistani politician
- Faredoon Irani, Indian cinematographer
- Faridoon Sharipov (born 1997), Tajikistani footballer

=== Fereydoon or Ferydoon ===
- Fereydoon Abbasi (1958–2025), Iranian nuclear scientist and politician
- Fereydoon Batmanghelidj (1931–2004), Iranian medical doctor
- Fereydoon Family (born 1945), Persian physicist
- Ferydoon Hemmati (born 1960), Iranian politician
- Fereydoon Hoveyda (1924–2006), Iranian diplomat, writer and thinker
- Fereydoon Farrokhzad (1936–1992), Persian singer, actor, poet, TV and Radio host, writer, and political opposition figure
- Fereydoon Fazli (born 1971), Iranian football player
- Fereydoon Foroughi (1951–2001), Iranian singer
- Fereydoon Mirza (1810–1855), the 5th son of Abbas Mirza, then crown prince of Persia
- Fereydoon Moshiri (1926–2000), contemporary Persian poet
- Fereydoon Motamed (1917–1993), Iranian professor and linguist
- Fereydoon Shahbazyan (1942–2025), Iranian composer and conductor
- Ferydoon Zandi (born 1979), Iranian football midfielder

=== Fereydoun or Ferydoun ===
- Fereydoun Ala (born 1931), Iranian physician and academician
- Fereydoun Davatchi, Iranian medical professor
- Fereydoun Djam (1914–2008), Iranian military official
- Fereydoun Farrokhzad (1938–1992), Iranian showman, host, poet, actor, political activist, singer, humanitarian and writer
- Fereydoun Ghanbari (1977–2021), Iranian wrestler
- Fereydoun Jeyrani (born 1951), Iranian film director, screenwriter and television presenter
- Fereydoun Keshavarz (1907–2006), Iranian physician and politician
- Fereydoun Kian, Iranian military officer
- Fereydoun Mahdavi (1932–2014), Iranian politician and economist
- Fereydoun Mirza Qajar (1922–1975), Iranian nobleman
- Fereydoun Moeini (born 1946), Iranian footballer
- Fereydoun Rahnema (1930–1975), Iranian film director and poet
- Ferydoun Sadeghi (died 2005), Iranian basketball player
- Fereydoun Tonekaboni (1937-2024), Iranian satirist and storyteller

=== Fereydun ===
- Fereydun, Iranian mythical king and hero
- Fereydun Adamiyat (1920–2008), Iranian historian
- Fereydun Robert "Fred" Armisen (born 1966), American comedian and actor
- Fereydun Gole (1942–2005), Iranian screenwriter
- Fereydun Khan Cherkes (died 1620/21), Safavid official and military commander

== See also ==
- Hassan Rouhani (born Hassan Fereydoun, 1948), 7th President of Iran
- Hossein Fereydoun (born 1957), Iranian politician
- Freydun (disambiguation)
