= Freydun (disambiguation) =

Freydun (Persian: فریدون Freydun; from Middle Persian Frēdōn, Proto-Iranian Θraitauna-) is an Iranian mythical character.

Freydun, Fereydun, Faridun, or Afridun may also refer to:

== People ==
- Freydun (given name), a list of people with the given name Freydun and its variants
- Fardunjee Marzban (1787–1847), Indian newspaper founder
- Hilla Rustomji Faridoonji (1872–1956), Indian educationist and political activist
- Naoroji Furdunji (1817–1885), Indian Parsi reformer
- Afridun I (1046–1120), 18th Shah of Shirvan
- Afridun II (fl. 1160), Shah of Shirvan
- Afridun Amu (born 1987), Afghan surfer
- Afridun ibn Karan (fl. 884–937), Baduspanid prince

== Places ==
- Faridun oil field, near Kharg Island, Iran
- Fereydoon Kenar, Iranian resort town on the Caspian Sea
- Fereydoon Shahr, city in the western part of the Isfahan Province, Iran
- Fereydun, Kerman, Iran
- Fereydun, Kermanshah, Iran
- Fereydun, Zanjan, Iran

== Other ==
- Özsoy, sometimes known as Fereydun, a Turkish opera
