= Yalveh =

Yalveh (Persian: يلوه) may refer to:

- Yalveh-ye Olya
- Yalveh-ye Sofla
