= Abadan (disambiguation) =

Abadan is a city in southwestern Iran.

Abadan may also refer to:

== Places ==
=== Iran ===
- Abadan County, Khuzestan Province
- Abadan, Isfahan, a village in Isfahan Province
- Abadan, Markazi, a village in Markazi Province
- Abadan, Sistan and Baluchestan, a village in Sistan and Baluchestan Province
- Abadan Island, site of the Iranian city

=== Elsewhere ===
- Abadan, Jalandhar, a village in the Indian state of Punjab
- Abadan, Turkmenistan, a city
- Abadan, Çubuk, a village in Ankara Province, Turkey

== Sports ==
- Sanat Naft Abadan FC, an Iranian football club based in Abadan
- Sanat Naft Novin Abadan F.C., an Iranian football club based in Abadan

== Other uses ==
- Abadan (surname), Turkish surname
- Abadan (film), a 2003 drama film by Iranian filmmaker Mani Haghighi
- Abadan Refinery, an oil refinery in Iran, built in 1912
- MT Abadan, a coastal tanker built in 1945 and scrapped in 1969
- Siege of Abadan (1980), a major action during the early part of the Iran–Iraq War
