= José Tadeu Carneiro Cardoso =

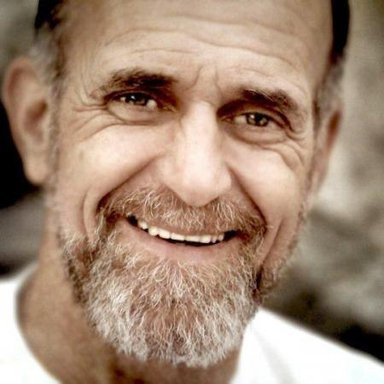
- Born: 1955 (age 70–71); Bahia, Brazil
- Other names: Mestre Camisa
- Style: Capoeira, ABADÁ-Capoeira
- Teacher: Mestre Bimba
- Rank: Mestre

José Tadeu Carneiro Cardoso (born October, 28th, 1955 in Jacobina, Bahia), also known as Mestre Camisa, is a Capoeira master, most known for creating the organization ABADÁ-Capoeira. ABADÁ-Capoeira was founded in 1988, and ever since, Camisa has been at the head of many important philanthropy and martial arts movements all over the world.

== History ==
Camisa's brother Edvaldo Carneiro da Silva, also known as Grão-Mestre Camisa Roxa, was the inspiration behind Camisa beginning his training in the Brazilian martial art of Capoeira, by urging him to enroll in an academy under the tutelage of Mestre Bimba. After about a year, Camisa became an Aluno Formado, a graduated student of Mestre Bimba.

In the early 1970s, Camisa accompanied his brother on a year-long tour of Brazil with the folkloric dance company Olodum Maré, which performed traditional arts including capoeira. At the end of the tour, instead of returning to his studies in Salvador, Camisa decided to remain in Rio de Janeiro to teach Capoeira. As stated by Matthias Röhrig Assunção in Capoeira : A History of an Afro-Brazilian Martial Art:

A number of Bahian capoeiristas ended up moving to Rio in the 1970s, attracted by the greater possibilities the city seemed to offer for the development of the art. Among them were Peito Pelado, Baianinho da Massaranduba and Dentinho, who all influenced the way younger Cariocians played capoeira. Camisa Roxa's younger brother José Tadeu Cardoso (M. Camisa, then still called Camisinha) arrived in 1972 and soon became a leading figure in the Senzala group.

He began to offer training in capoeira and slowly gained students. Camisa began to consider the need to design a formal structure for classes, to draw up a basic lesson plan, to create a place for studying and teaching, a place to debate techniques and discuss concepts. In addition, he felt the need to give a family-like structure to so many people who had left behind their cities and their friends and families and moved to Rio to dedicate themselves to capoeira. The latter was the main impetus for the creation of a new organization that would, in 1988, become ABADÁ-Capoeira.

Since the beginning of the 1980s, Mestre Camisa had been drawing on his experience in Mestre Bimba's Academy to develop his own style and build his school. His unique technique and methodology improved the martial aspect of capoeira, and established him as the leading capoeira master in the world.

== CEMB ==
The Centro Educacional Mestre Bimba (CEMB), in English translated as "Mestre Bimba Educational Center", is:

a space idealized by Mestre Camisa and built in honor of Mestre Bimba who loved nature. The CEMB offers courses, training sessions, meetings, lectures, workshops, ecological hikes, climbing, horseback riding, soccer, local cultural demonstrations, experience with rural customs, opportunity for contact with animals, a taste of food cooked on a traditional wood-burning oven and lessons in environmental preservation. All these activities are adapted so Capoeira movements can be added to them. Following the philosophy that we should use what nature offers, a large training area was constructed, using sapê (a local thatch), eucalyptus and stones, where the activities take place. The CEMB is located in the interior of the State of Rio de Janeiro, in the city of Itaboraí, and offers sleeping quarters for 60 people and a camping area that can handle 100 tents.

The above text was taken as it appears from the website ABADÁ-Capoeira Hungary. CEMB was created and built entirely by Camisa. As stated above, it is a place for capoeiristas to congregate, train, and help spread the awakening ecological projects spurred on by the Center.

== See also ==
- Capoeira Angola

== Printed references ==
- Almeida, Birra "Mestre Acordeon" (1986). Capoeira: A Brazilian Art Form. Berkeley: North Atlantic Books. ISBN 0-938190-30-X.
- Assunção, Matthias Röhrig (2005). Capoeira : A History of an Afro-Brazilian Martial Art. New York: Routledge. ISBN 0-7146-8086-9.
