= ABADÁ-Capoeira =

Non profit organization in Brazil

- Also known as: Associação Brasileira de Apoio e Desenvolvimento da Arte-Capoeira (The Brazilian Association for the Support and Development of the Art of Capoeira)
- Date founded: 1988
- Country of origin: Brazil
- Founder: Mestre Camisa (born 1956)
- Current head: Mestre Camisa
- Arts taught: Capoeira
- Ancestor arts: Capoeira Regional • Capoeira Angola
- Descendant arts: none
- Ancestor schools: Academia-escola de Capoeira Regional
- Official website: ABADÁ-Capoeira Brazil

The Associação Brasileira de Apoio e Desenvolvimento da Arte-Capoeira (ABADÁ-Capoeira), in English translated as "The Brazilian Association for the Support and Development of the Art of Capoeira", is a nonprofit organization whose purpose is to spread and support Brazilian culture through the practice of Capoeira. Founded in 1988 by Mestre Camisa, José Tadeu Carneiro Cardoso, ABADÁ is based in Rio de Janeiro, Brazil. It is one of the largest capoeira organizations in the world with over 41,000 members representing schools throughout every state of Brazil as well as 30 countries. ABADÁ is distinguished from other capoeira organizations by its worldwide growth as well as its style, standards, and philosophy.

== Style, standards, and philosophy ==
=== Style ===
"ABADÁ-Capoeira prides itself on the originality and constant refinement of its style of capoeira, renown [sic] for its efficiency, aesthetics, and its cultural and historical relevance", explains ABADÁ-Capoeira San Francisco. Part of the contemporary renaissance of capoeira, ABADÁ-Capoeira seeks to incorporate the practices of the two main branches of the art, Capoeira Regional and Capoeira Angola. Its instruction embraces the fundamental customs of the time-honored art while at the same time engaging the modernizing advances of recent Mestres, in particular Mestre Bimba. An aluno formado of Mestre Bimba, Camisa "developed his own philosophy and methodology for teaching capoeira by following the innovative concepts of his teacher, the great master of Capoeira Regional, Bimba. Mestre Camisa's vision for ABADÁ-Capoeira has been to create an organization that strives to move forward by keeping one foot in the past and one foot in the future, maintaining tradition while adapting to society's changes".

=== Standards ===
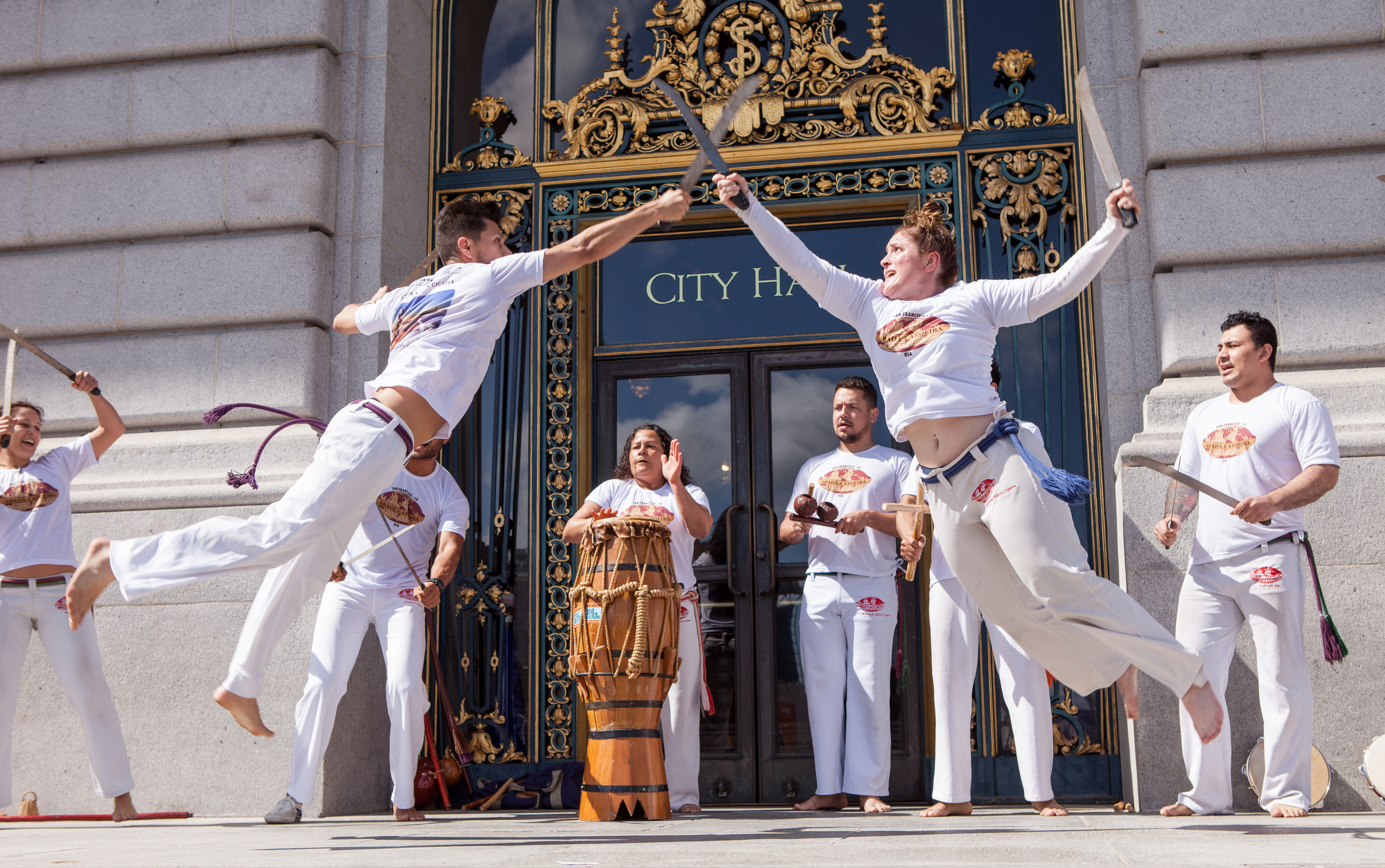
ABADÁ-Capoeira San Francisco in March 2017

As explained by ABADÁ-Capoeira San Francisco:

ABADÁ-Capoeira believes that the study of capoeira involves dedication to all the various aspects of the art, emphasizing in particular the relentless pursuit of technical mastery of the physical elements of capoeira and the constant evolution of the technique to improve efficiency and prevent injury. Equally important is the understanding of and reverence for capoeira's rich history, including the preservation and recovery of the instruments, rhythms, and games of capoeira, individual competency in and knowledge of the game’s music and instruments, and participation in the larger capoeira community in Brazil and throughout the world.

As this last suggests, ABADÁ-Capoeira expresses itself not only as an athletic endeavor but also as a holistic practice that helps individuals develop as members of society at large.

=== Philosophy ===
As described by ABADÁ-Capoeira New York City, ABADÁ-Capoeira incorporates a multi-leveled philosophy aimed at sustaining the development of capoeira through its members as well as utilizing capoeira as tool for individual and communal growth. At its base, the school stresses the "relentless pursuit of the technical mastery of capoeira, at both the student and instructor levels". Training provides a solid foundation in the art’s movements and principles, promoting discipline as well as physical and mental awareness. Ongoing training recognizes the transformation of the student into a teacher as she or he progresses through various stages of development and returns his or her learned experience to the group. This process helps maintain the original value systems of the early capoeira masters, their culture and their life experiences, as the cycle of learning continues. At the same time, a dialogue opens by which the "teacher" is also informed and instructed by the "student" as the student marks her or his own personal achievements as a capoeirista.

Just as important, ABADÁ-Capoeira promotes capoeira as an artistic and cultural resource, as well as a valuable pedagogic tool. A holistic approach to all aspects of the art and its traditions, in particular the songs and instruments, helps maintain a firm connection to its Brazilian heritage. At the same time, ABADÁ-Capoeira promotes creative exploration within the idea of "play". Capoeiristas do not exactly compete in the rodas, but rather strive with their partner to produce the best game possible, and this understanding of play extends into other aspects of the capoeirista’s training.

The school further seeks to "promote cultural and human values" based on respect, freedom, integrity, and strength. Its social orientation also advocates community building, leadership in daily practice, and the pursuit of education. It hopes to accomplish these goals by spreading the art of capoeira in and through universities, schools, clubs, associations, and diverse communities. It also hopes to emphasize the cultural lessons inherent in its Brazilian roots, and by doing so, promote social integration between people of different backgrounds and classes. While keeping sight of its social goals, ABADÁ-Capoeira also seeks to instill good character, dignity, and strong personal values in its students. Training thus reinforces personal integrity and can offer personal and spiritual examination.

== History and Mestres ==
ABADÁ-Capoeira was officially established in 1988 in Rio de Janeiro. Mestre Camisa’s intention was to develop a group formally dedicated to the practice of the art which would also build a strong sense of family and community for the numerous capoeiristas. This worldwide community is guided by the school’s Mestres, who currently number six. In the tradition of capoeira, all practitioners are given an apelido, or nickname, establishing their identity within ABADÁ-Capoeira. Appelidos are typically assigned during batizado celebrations, when new members are welcomed into the community.

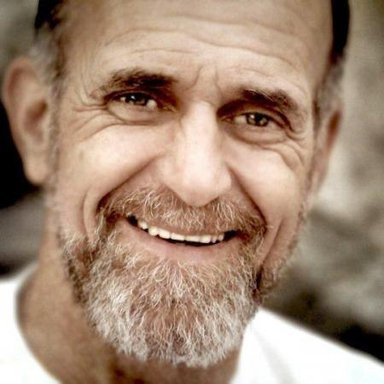
Mestre Camisa - ABADÁ CAPOEIRA

=== Mestre Camisa ===
Mestre Camisa, born José Tadeu Carneiro Cardoso, grew up on a farm known as Fazenda Estiva in northeast of Brazil, in the state of Bahia. He grew up with nine siblings, the eldest being Edvaldo Carneiro da Silva, who became the capoeirista Camisa Roxa. Mestre Camisa first began studying capoeira at about the age of seven, following the movements of others playing in neighborhood street rodas and instructed by his older brother Camisa Roxa, himself a student of the legendary Mestre Bimba.

When Camisa turned 12 years old, Camisa Roxa convinced their mother to allow him to attend Mestre Bimba’s academy in Salvador, where he received more formal education in the art and was exposed to the diversity of practitioners gathered in the city. After about a year, Camisa became an Aluno Formado, a graduated student of Mestre Bimba.

In the early 70’s, Camisa joined his brother in a year-long tour of Brazil with the folkloric dance company Olodum Maré, also known as the Grupo Folclórico de Bahia, which performed traditional arts including capoeira. The tour included three months of performances in Rio de Janeiro before the troupe departed for a reformulated tour of Europe. Mestre Camisa stayed in Brazil, as he was supposed to return to Salvador to complete his studies; instead, he remained in Rio and began earning his living by teaching capoeira.

His first few months in Rio were difficult personally as he was basically poor and did not have established friends or connections in the city. He began to offer training in capoeira and slowly gained students. It was during this first period in Rio that Mestre Camisa first began to consider the need to design a formal structure for classes, to draw up a basic lesson plan, to create a place for studying and teaching, a place to debate techniques and discuss concepts. In addition, he felt the need to give a family-like structure to so many people who had left behind their cities and their friends and families and moved to Rio to dedicate themselves to capoeira. The latter was the main impetus for the creation of a new organization that would, in 1988, become ABADÁ-Capoeira.

Since the beginning of the 1980s, Mestre Camisa had been drawing on his experience in Mestre Bimba’s Academy to develop his own style and build his school. His unique technique and methodology improved the martial aspect of capoeira, and established him as the leading capoeira master in the world. Since he does not have a massive physique, Camisa developed a technique to neutralize his opponent with slips, takedowns, speed, and efficiency in the application of the moves, blows, and kicks. This technique allows him to face a bigger opponent under equal conditions.

Mestre Camisa is a researcher of Capoeira and its variations. He teaches workshops and seminars and attends batizados de Capoeira throughout the world. Through ABADÁ-Capoeira, Mestre Camisa goal is to create a globalized form of Capoeira will preserving the Cultural, Artistic, and Historical context of the sport . In Capoeira: A Brazilian Art Form, Bira Almeida, "Mestre Acordeon," notes, "Camisa [is] one of the best contemporary teachers and a very accomplished capoeirista, who has been training ceaselessly since he was twelve. Influenced by his older brother, Camisa Rôxa, Camisa's strong commitment to Capoeira is reflected in his maturity in the art and in the result of his work."

=== Grão Mestre Camisa Roxa ===
Grão-Mestre Camisa Roxa was born Edvaldo Carneiro da Silva in 1944 and spent his childhood on the Fazenda Estiva, a farm in the interior of Salvador, Bahia. He was the eldest of ten children, and he was greatly respected by his younger siblings, a number of whom followed in his footsteps in life and in capoeira.

As detailed by ACNYC:

When he was 10 years old, Grão-Mestre Camisa Roxa began to play capoeira. At the time, it was only one of the many games he played to entertain himself and to pass the long hours of childhood. He had no idea that, 19 years later, he would be a professional capoeirista and the first to carry his art outside of Brazil, first to Europe and then around the world.

Camisa Roxa first made his name as a capoeirista in Salvador, Bahia, as a student of Mestre Bimba. In the 1960s, he left his family ranch for the capital city in order to complete his high school education. In addition to his school work, he also began studying capoeira at Bimba’s Academy. He was an apt and hard working pupil, and eventually gained recognition as Bimba’s best student.

His talent and knowledge of capoeira became recognized throughout the community as he sought out other capoeiristas: playing in the rodas at Mestre Pastinha's academy and in the rodas of Mestres Valdemar and Traira on Pero Vaz Street, Camisa Roxa became very highly regarded.

When he was 21, Grão-Mestre Camisa Roxa's father died, and he became the patriarch of his family. He took on the responsibility of educating his brothers and sisters and providing for their general welfare. He became their second father, and was greatly admired by all. In fact, three of his brothers—Ermival, Pedrinho, and José Tadeu—followed in his footsteps, training capoeira with Mestre Bimba at his academy in Salvador. Like their brother, all three became alunos formados, graduates, of the Acadamia de Mestre Bimba.

Camisa Roxa eventually began teaching capoeira in a number of academies and clubs in Salvador. Inspired by the idea of spreading the practice of capoeira, Camisa Roxa helped form the folkloric dance company Olodum Maré, a travelling performance group to promote traditional arts, including capoeira, throughout Brazil. After completing a year-long tour of the country, the group planned a tour of Europe under the name "Brasil Tropical."

When the troupe embarked in 1973, "few people believed that his voyage would meet with success. Yet, trusting in his vision, his talent, and in the power of capoeira, Camisa Roxa made the journey and [he and the troupe were] very well received. That trip was the first step towards what has now become the internationalization of capoeira". In Capoeira : A History of an Afro-Brazilian Martial Art Matthias Röhrig Assunção states, "Important for the diffusion of capoeira in Europe during the 1970s was Brazil Tropical, a company headed by the dancer and choreographer Domingos Campos and M. Camisa Roxa. Camisa Roxa, a student of M. Bimba, was at the time considered to be one of the best Regional players of Brazil." The Brasil Tropical troupe would become dedicated to promoting the art of capoeira throughout the world. Though the art remains firmly rooted in Brazil, it has been planted in 40 countries around the world, largely as a result of the travels and the work of Grão-Mestre Camisa Roxa.

Grão Mestre Camisa Roxa has lived the last years in Austria. He has coordinated centers of ABADÁ Capoeira in Europe and he has been the organizer for the ABADÁ Capoeira "Jogos Europeus". He died 18 April 2013 in Salvador (Brasil)

=== Mestre Cobra ===
This bio originally appeared at the website for ACNYC. This version has been significantly edited for grammar, translation, and stylistic errors; the content has not been altered.

Mestre Cobra, Antonio Marcelo Rodrigues Trinade, was born in Amparo—a city in the interior of the state of São Paulo—on November 18th, 1963. As a teenager he used to watch capoeira rodas around town with friends. Capoeiristas noticed his interest in the art and invited him to train at the local capoeira school where he met Mestre Carlão. Cobra was the oldest of four children, so by the time he turned sixteen, he was working as a weaver to help support his family. Every day after work he went to the capoeira school and became one of Carlão's most dedicated students.

Capoeira also helped him overcome one of the most difficult moments of his life: the early loss of his mother when he was 16 years old. The family experienced difficult moments with the separation of the brothers while the father, who was a traveling salesman, was reorganizing the structure of the family. "At [that] moment capoeira was my escape valve; [it's] what held me together, and this gave me motivation," explains Cobra.

Cobra trained in the city of Amparo for six years, hearing stories of great capoeiristas and about capoeira in Rio de Janeiro. Mestre Carlão spoke about Camisa not only as a great capoeirista, but also in reference to his personality, the work he was doing, and his preoccupation with the direction in which capoeira was heading. These conversations sparked Cobra’s interest in going to Rio de Janeiro to meet Mestre Camisa. During a trip to Acres for a batizado at the school of Mestre Rodolfo (the Mestre of Carlão), Cobra met Mestre Camisa and asked if he could go to Rio de Janeiro to take a class with him; Mestre Camisa agreed. Cobra held the rank of Graduado and taught capoeira in Amparo, but he had many financial difficulties. Despite that, Cobra began saving money for the trip to Rio.

In December 1984, Cobra went to Rio with just enough money to watch one of Camisa’s classes and return to Amparo the next day. When he arrived at the class, he was told that Mestre Camisa was at the Circo Voador (The Flying Circus), organizing the First National Capoeira Encounter. When Cobra arrived at the Circo Voador, he saw Mestre Rodolfo, who told him it was very important that Cobra participate in Camisa’s event. Mestre Rodolfo paid for Cobra's hotel and meals for a week, which he remembers today as the greatest gift of his life. He reflects, "At that point I realized my destiny was going to change...I understood how advanced capoeira was in Rio de Janeiro compared to the rest of the country; I was fascinated by the world of capoeira and its leadership here in Rio de Janeiro".

From 1985 to 1986, Cobra trained monthly in Rio de Janeiro. He spent a week at the “Associação” in Botafogo, where he trained daily from 4–6 PM with Mestre Camisa and 7–10 PM with Mestre Caio before returning to São Paulo. In 1987, Cobra decided to move to Rio de Janeiro permanently. Cobra informed Mestre Carlão about his decision. In response, Mestre Carlão asked Mestre Camisa to welcome Cobra, saying he was a good man to have by his side. And so Camisa gave Cobra a small room at the Associação, the capoeira school where Camisa once taught.

"That little room was like a five star hotel; a place where I can live and train...it was the best", Cobra would recall. He began to train consistently with Mestre Camisa and soon took on organizing events and social projects. As Mestre Camisa developed ABADÁ-Capoeira in the late 1980s, Cobra stood by his side, and he has ever since. As the ABADÁ organization grew, so did Mestre Cobra’s popularity as one of the most technical capoeiristas in Rio.

Mestre Cobra has not stopped giving workshops and seminars throughout the world. In 1993 he received the rank of Mestrando, and in 2005 he was recognized as a Mestre. Mestre Cobra has mentored hundreds of students and has been an essential piece in the growth of ABADÁ-Capoeira.

=== Mestre Morcego ===
Rogério Francisco da Silva, was born in Rio de Janeiro and began training capoeira in 1981. Mestre Morcego began training with Mestre Camisa at the Santa Luzia Regatta and Swimming Club in Aterro do Flamengo, RJ, Brazil. In 1989, he received the brown cord. In 1991, Mestre Morcego along with Mestres Cobra and Canguru, were the first to receive the brown and red cords of Abadá-Capoeira. In 1995, he received the red cord and was recognized as Mestrando Morcego. In 2011, he was recognized as Mestre by Mestre Camisa and Abadá-Capoeira. During the period from 1984 to 2011, Mestre Morcego balanced his time between being an active member of the Marine Corps of Brazil and as a capoeirista. Today, however, Mestre Morcego is solely dedicated to capoeira! He supervises and guides the members of the Abadá School. Mestre Morcego travels internationally in order to teach up to date technical courses. Mestre Morcego is fluent in English thus facilitating the dynamics of his teachings.

=== Mestre Canguru ===
Waldec Velasco Cota.
Started capoeira in 1980. Became a Mestrando in 2000 and a Mestre in 2013.
He currently lives and teaches in Rio de Janeiro.

=== Mestra Edna Lima ===
Edna Lima.
Mestra Edna started training capoeira in 1975. She is also a black belt in karate. She became a Mestranda in 1997 and a Mestra in 2013. Mestra Edna created Capoeira Workout which is based on capoeira moves.
She currently lives and teaches in New York City.

=== Mestra Márcia Cigarra ===
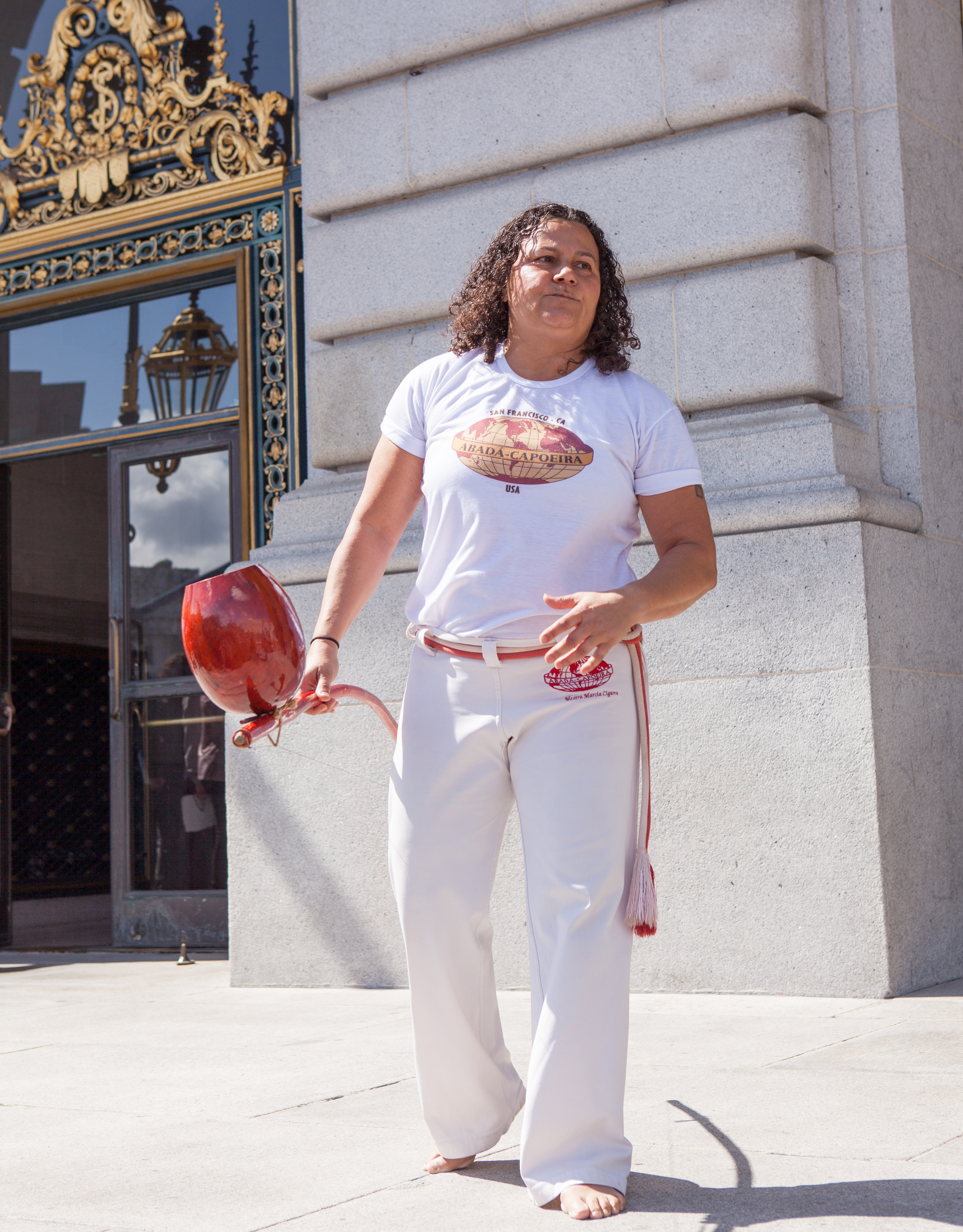
Márcia Treidler at San Francisco City Hall, March 2017

Márcia Treidler.
Started Capoeira in 1982. Became a Mestranda in 1997 and a Mestre in 2013.
She currently lives and teaches in San Francisco.

== Mestrandos ==
The group of Mestrandas and Mestrandos in ABADÁ-Capoeira’s forty-thousand-member organization contains 25 individuals who have committed to the art of capoeira. Their work supports the technique and philosophy of ABADÁ-Capoeira. Led by the Mestres, these Mestrandos/as oversee ABADÁ-Capoeira internationally to maintain its style, technique, and philosophy, and to promote the art of capoeira. The Mestrandos/as, together with the Mestres, are also responsible for managing movements, norms, and ethics within the organization.

	Training Capoeira Since:	Recognized as a Mestrando/a:	Teaches in:
Mestrando Tigre, Francisco Alves Filho	1984	2013	Belgium
Mestrando Cascao, Luiz Fernando Pereira Monteiro	1983	2013	Portugal
Mestrando Bode, Cassius Vinicius Caetano Guimarães	1987	2013	Florianópolis
Mestrando Pretão, Lucio Oliveira	1977	2019	Alemanha
Mestrando Cafuzo, Joel Benedito dos Santos	1984	2021	Espanha

Mestrando Leão, André Marcio Feliz de Albuquerque |1988 |2024 |Brasil |João Pessoa PB |}

== Cord System ==
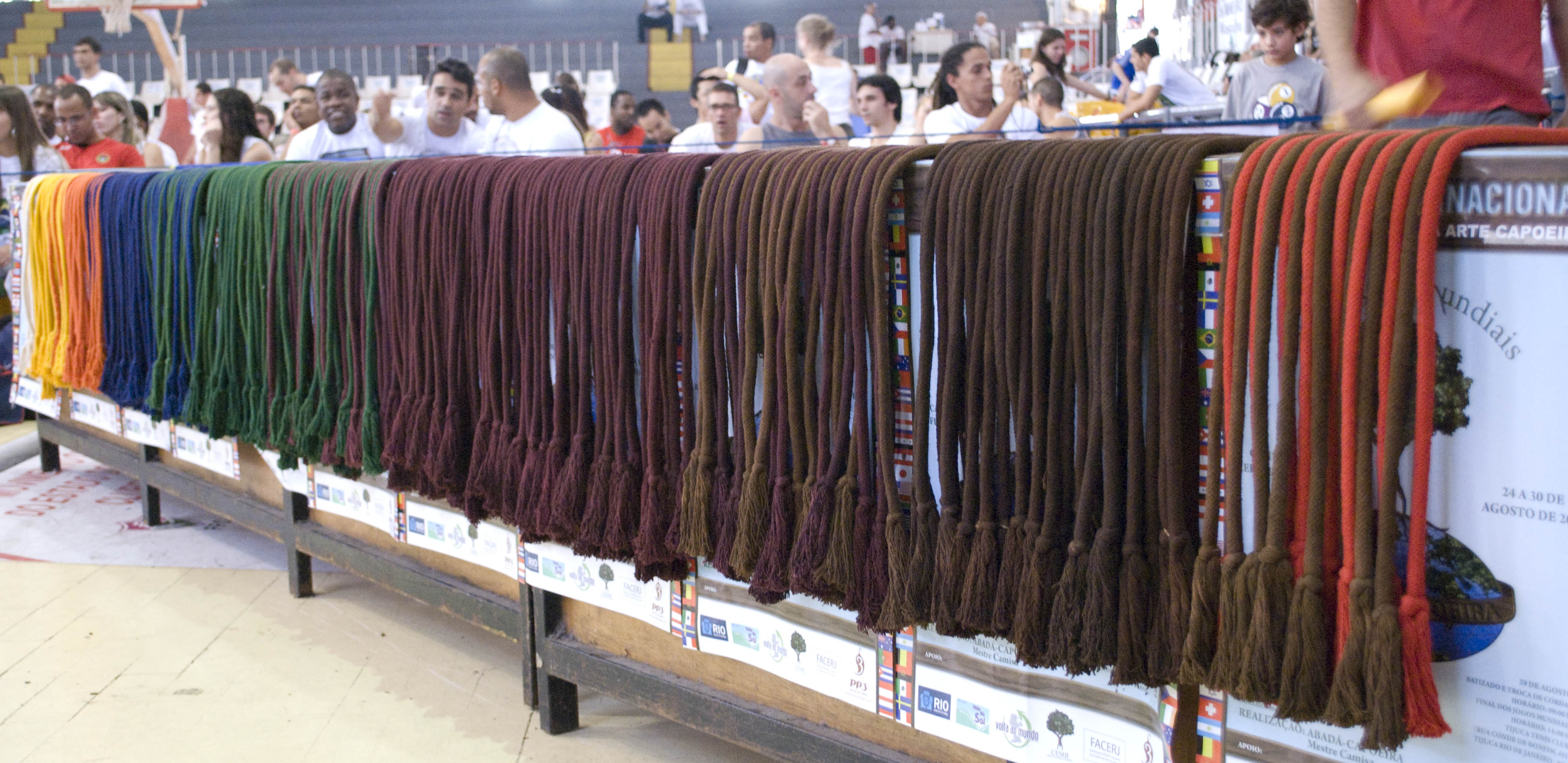
Cordas from Troca de Cordas, ABADÁ-Capoeira Jogos Mundiais 2009, Rio de Janeiro, Brazil

ABADÁ has a graduated cord system using colors that refer symbolically to nature and reflect the level of practice. The cord system does not so much reflect the practitioner’s level of skill as much as their progress on their individual path as a member of the ABADÁ community. The cord system as outlined by Arte Capoeira Center – ABADÁ Capoeira is as follows.

=== Adult Graduation System ===
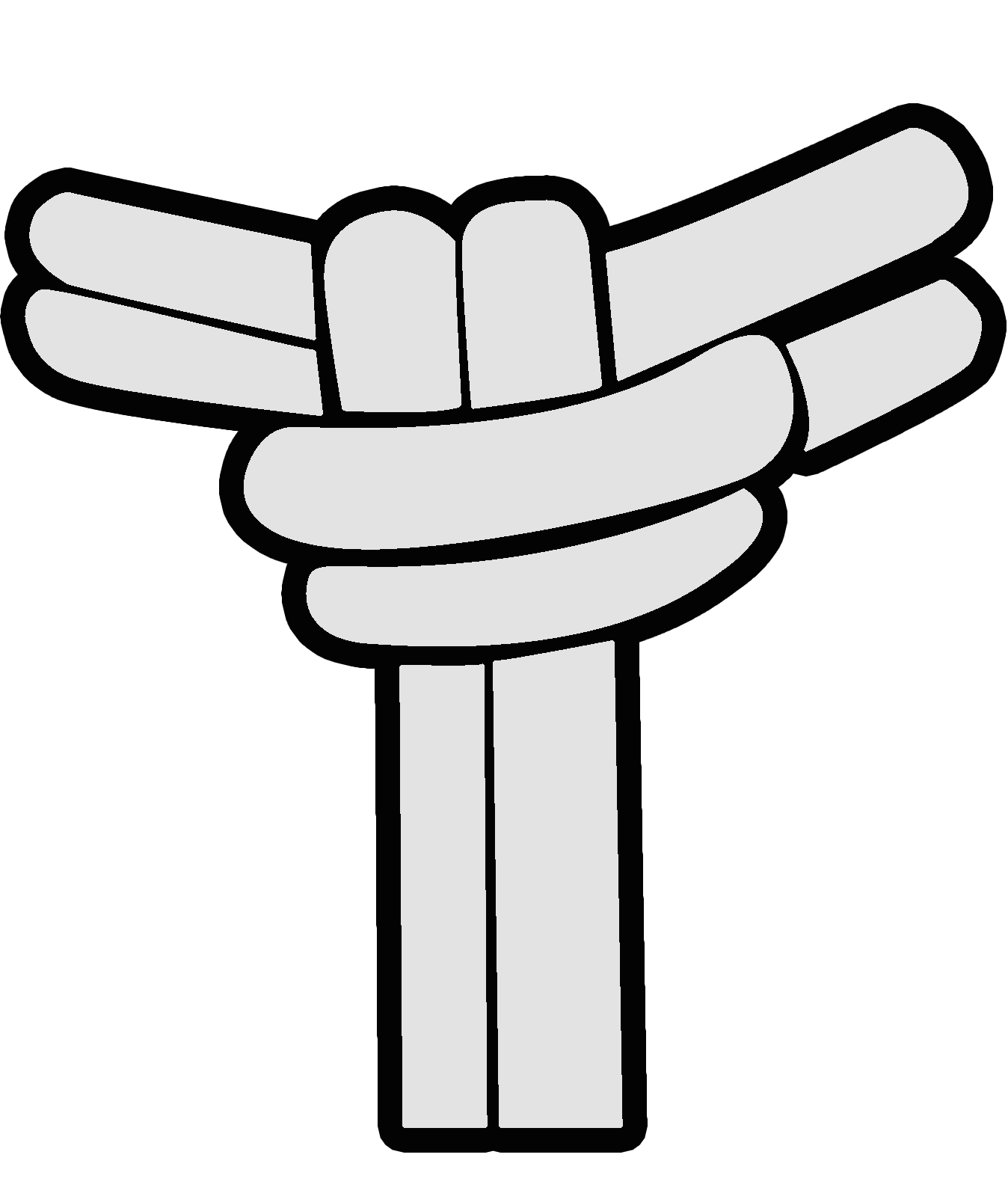
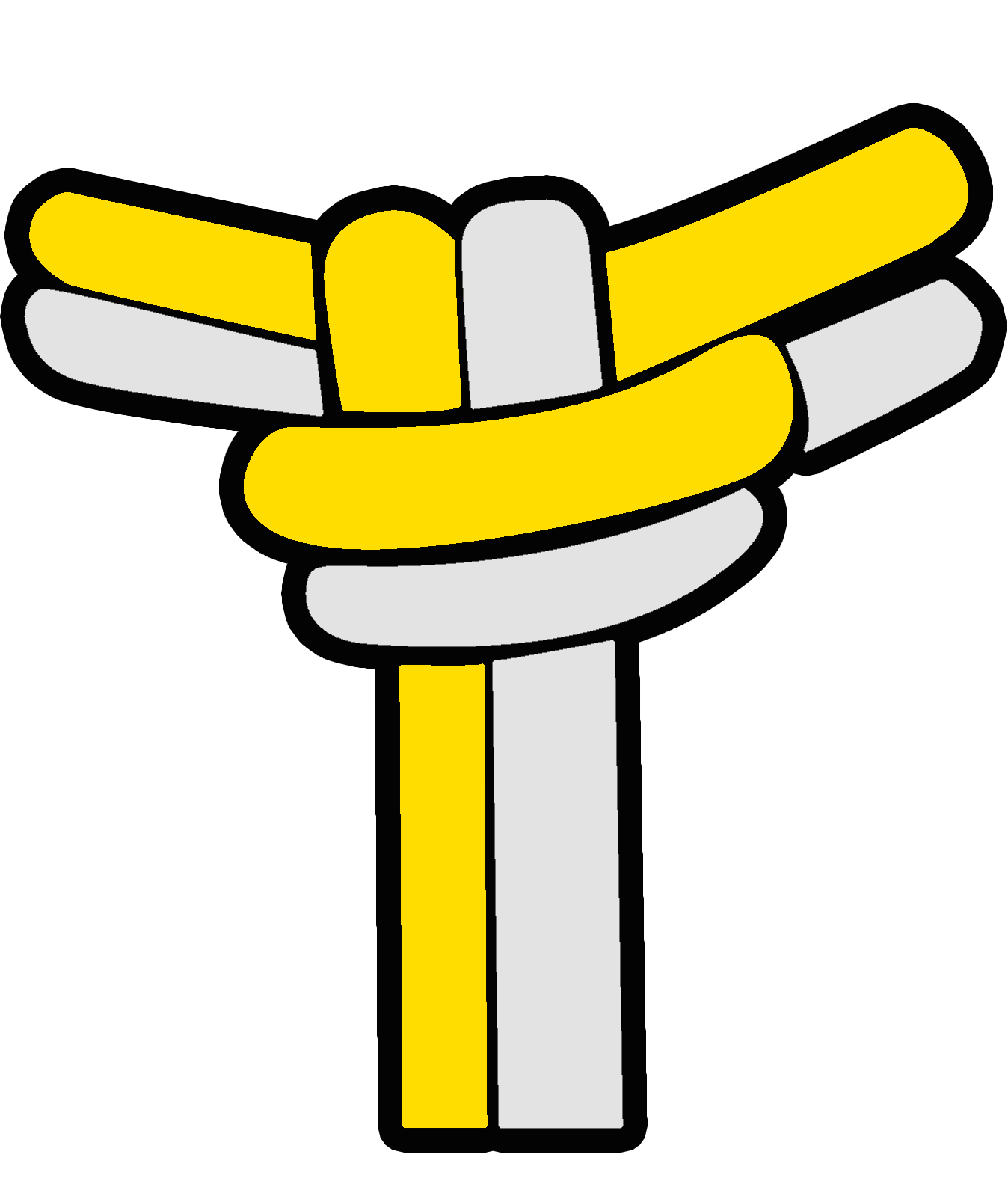
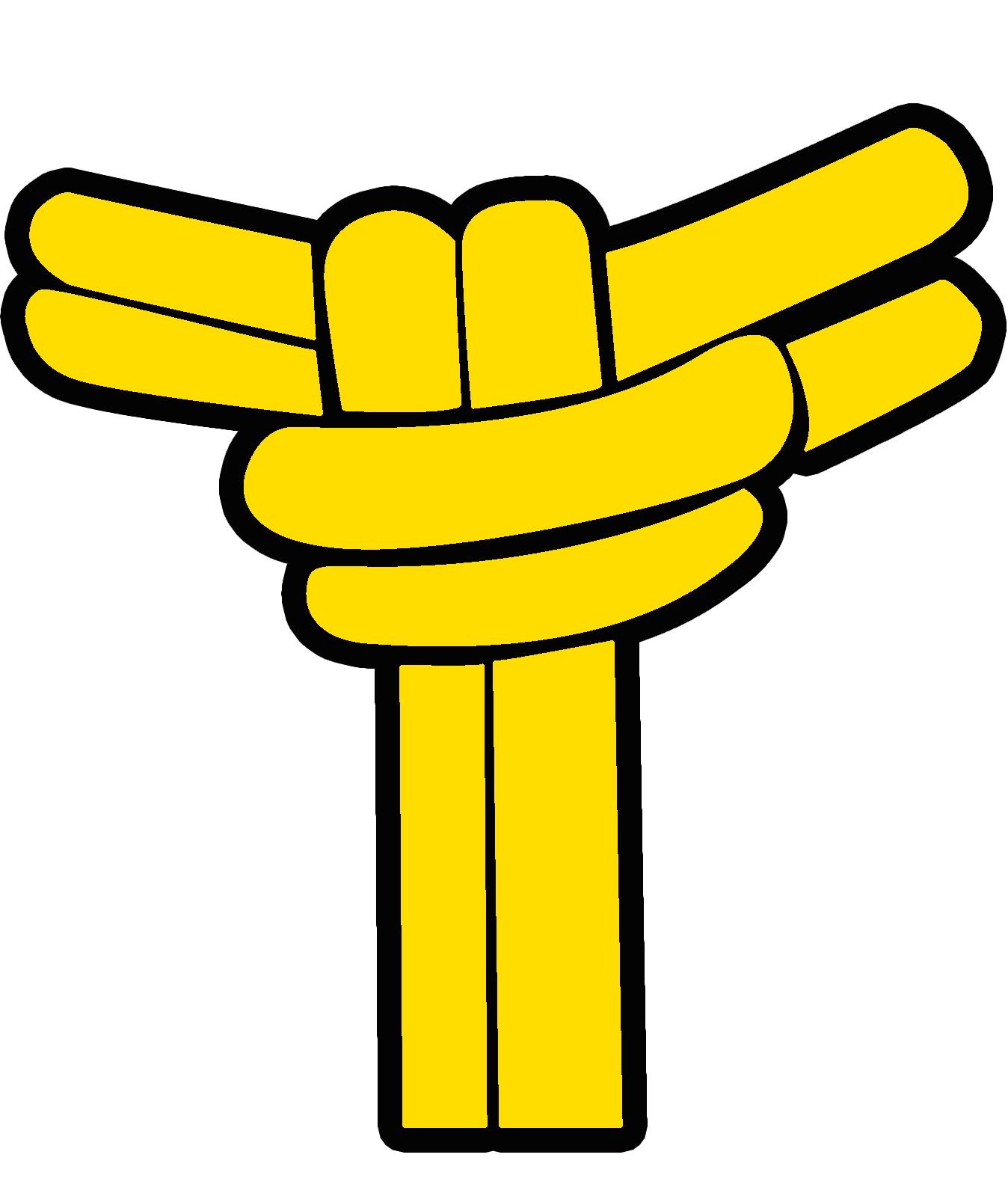
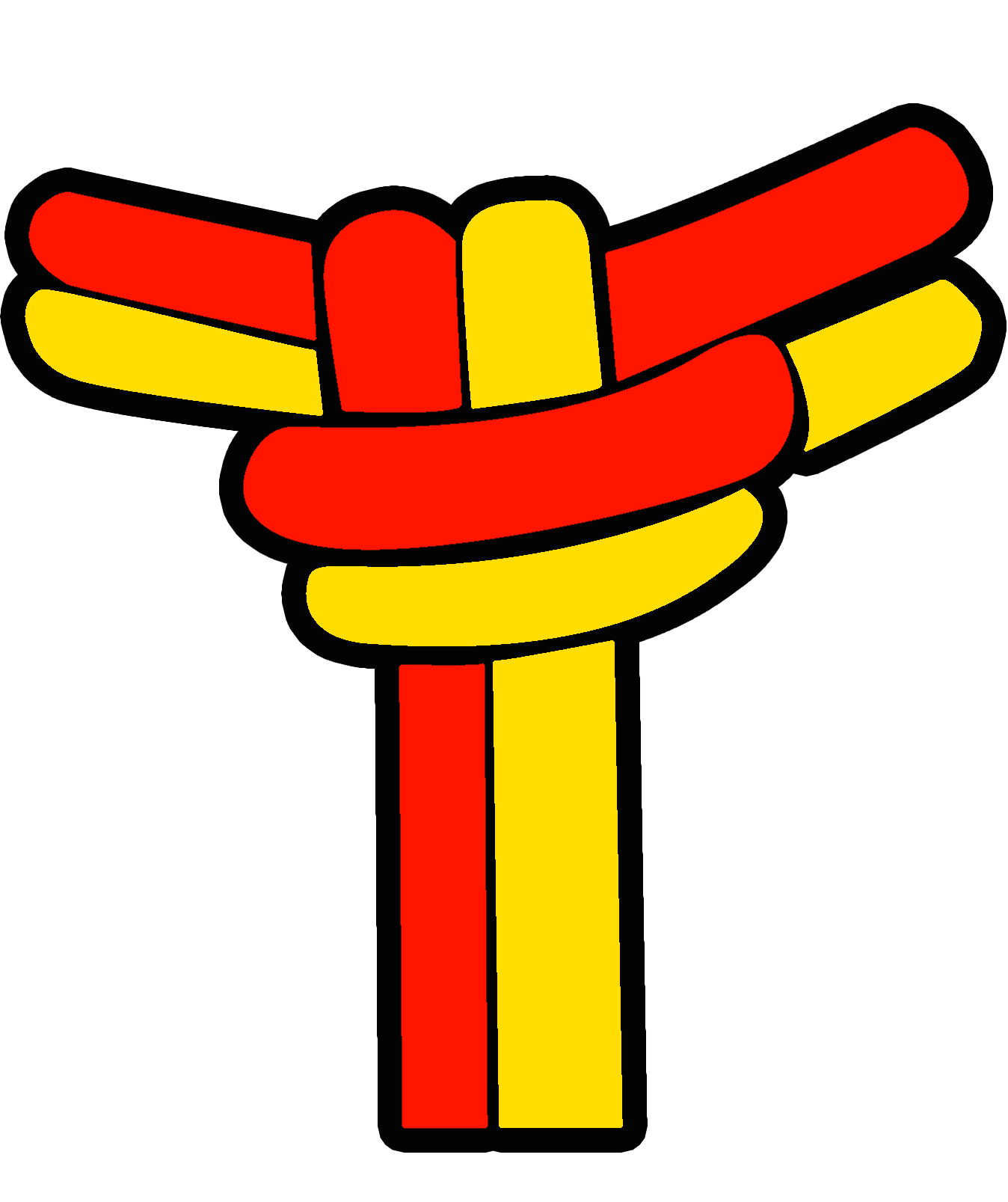
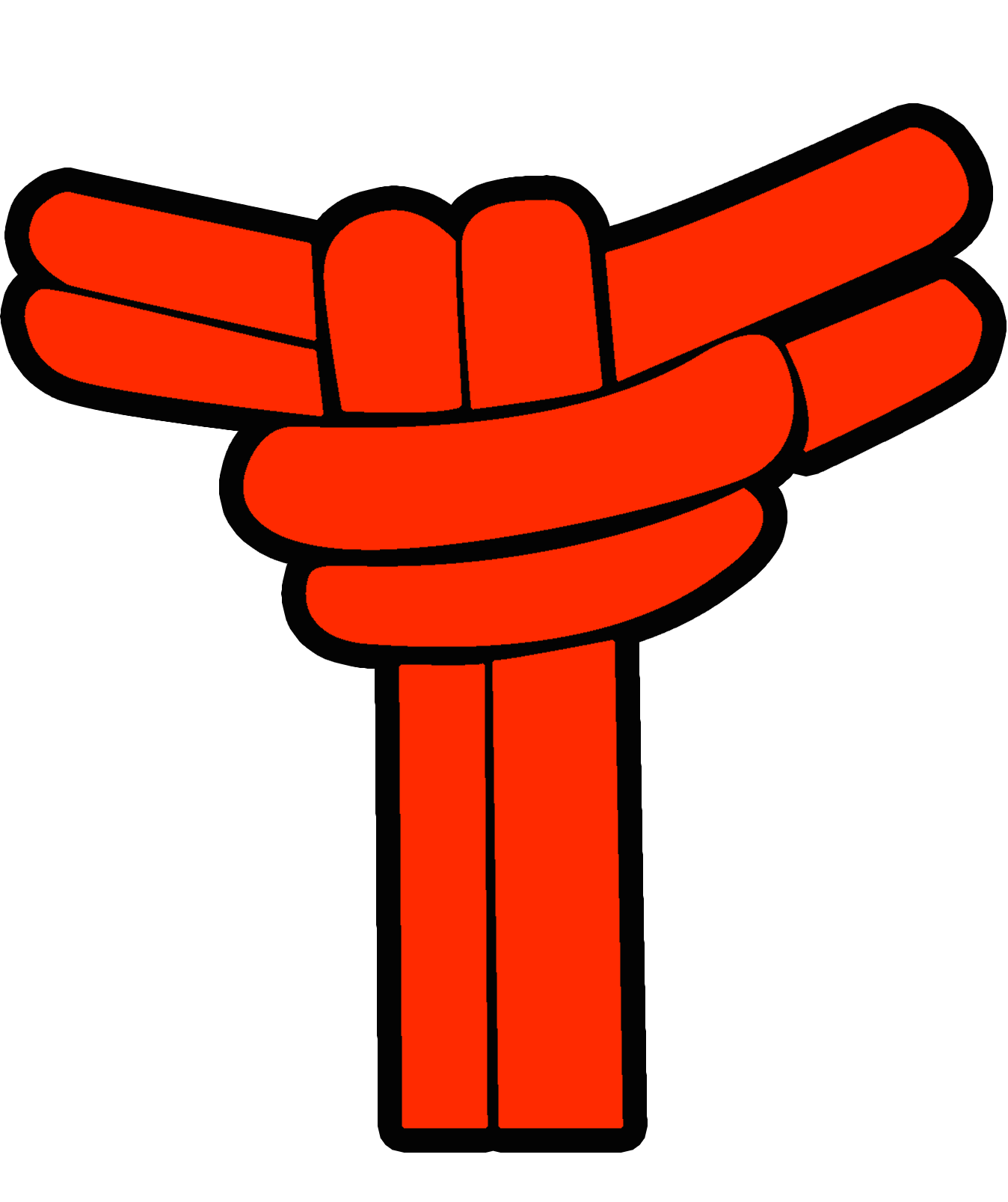
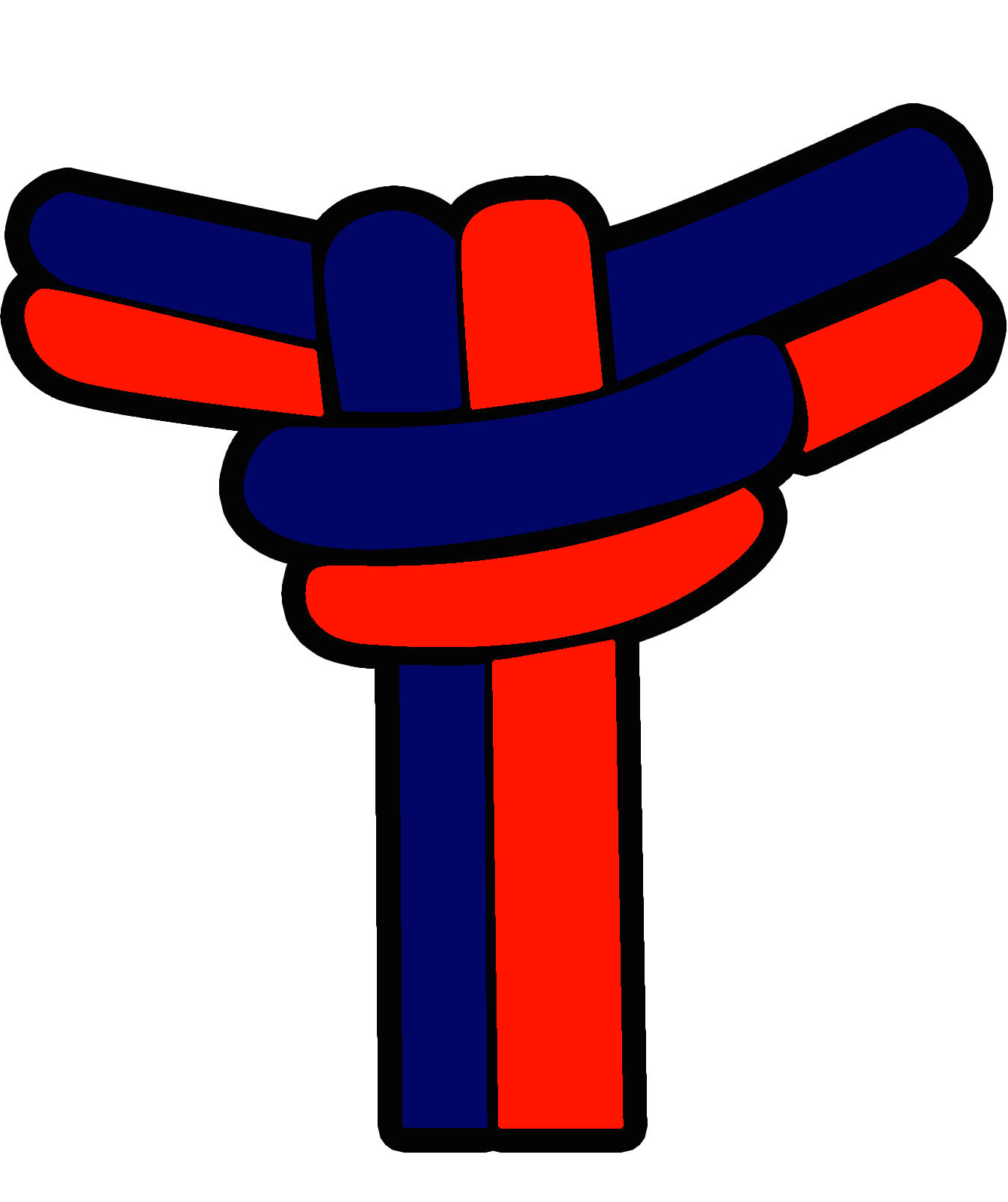
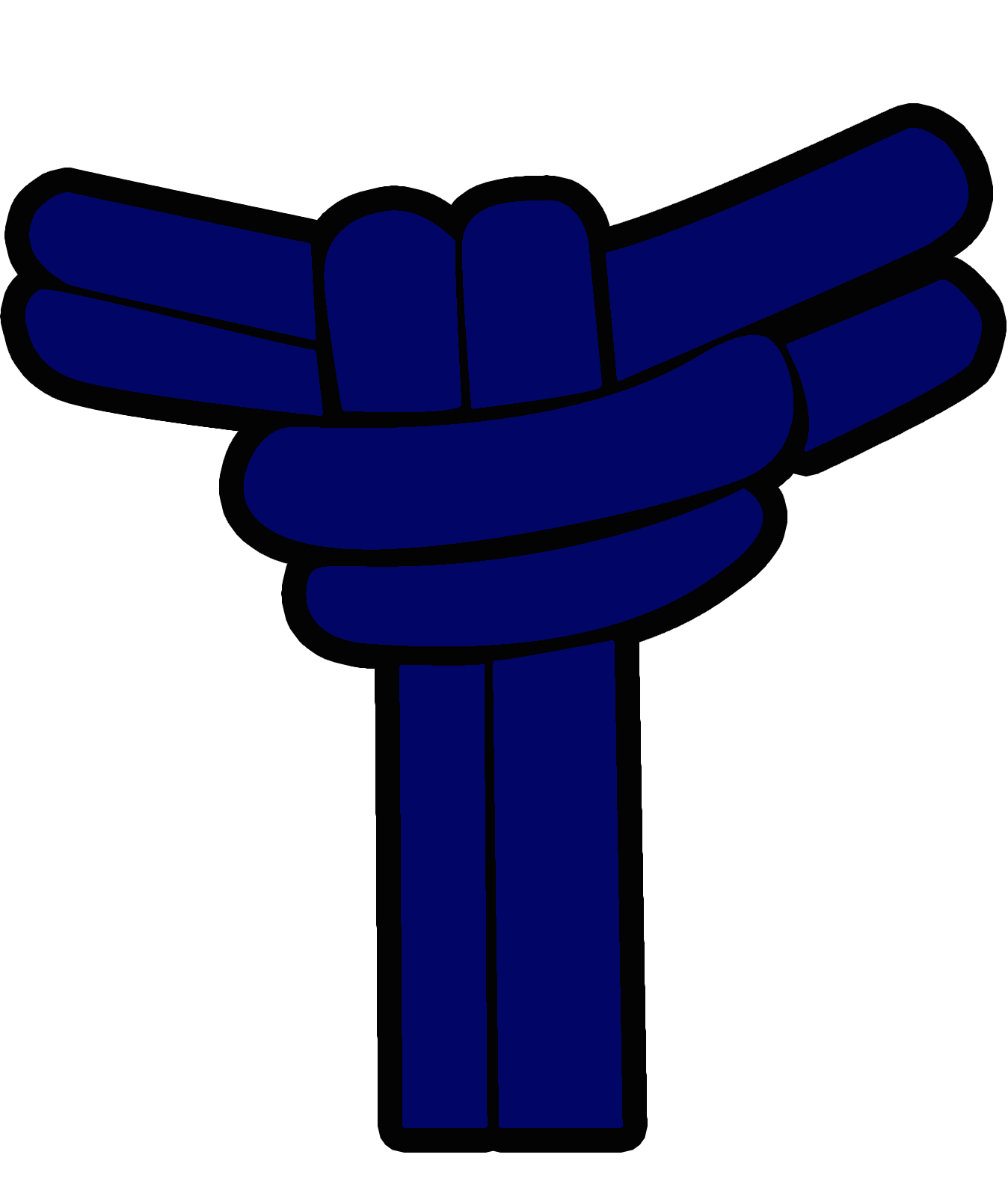
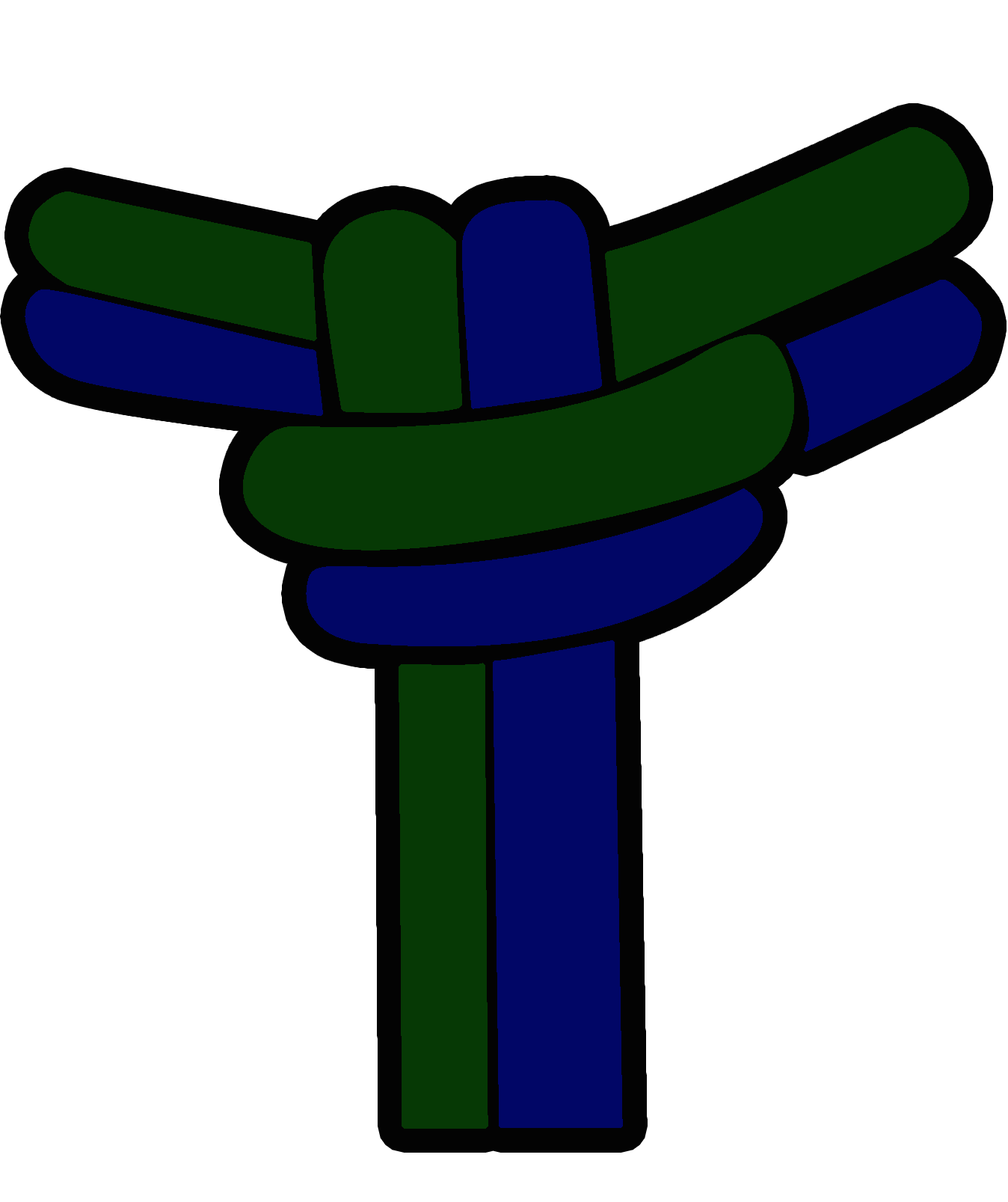
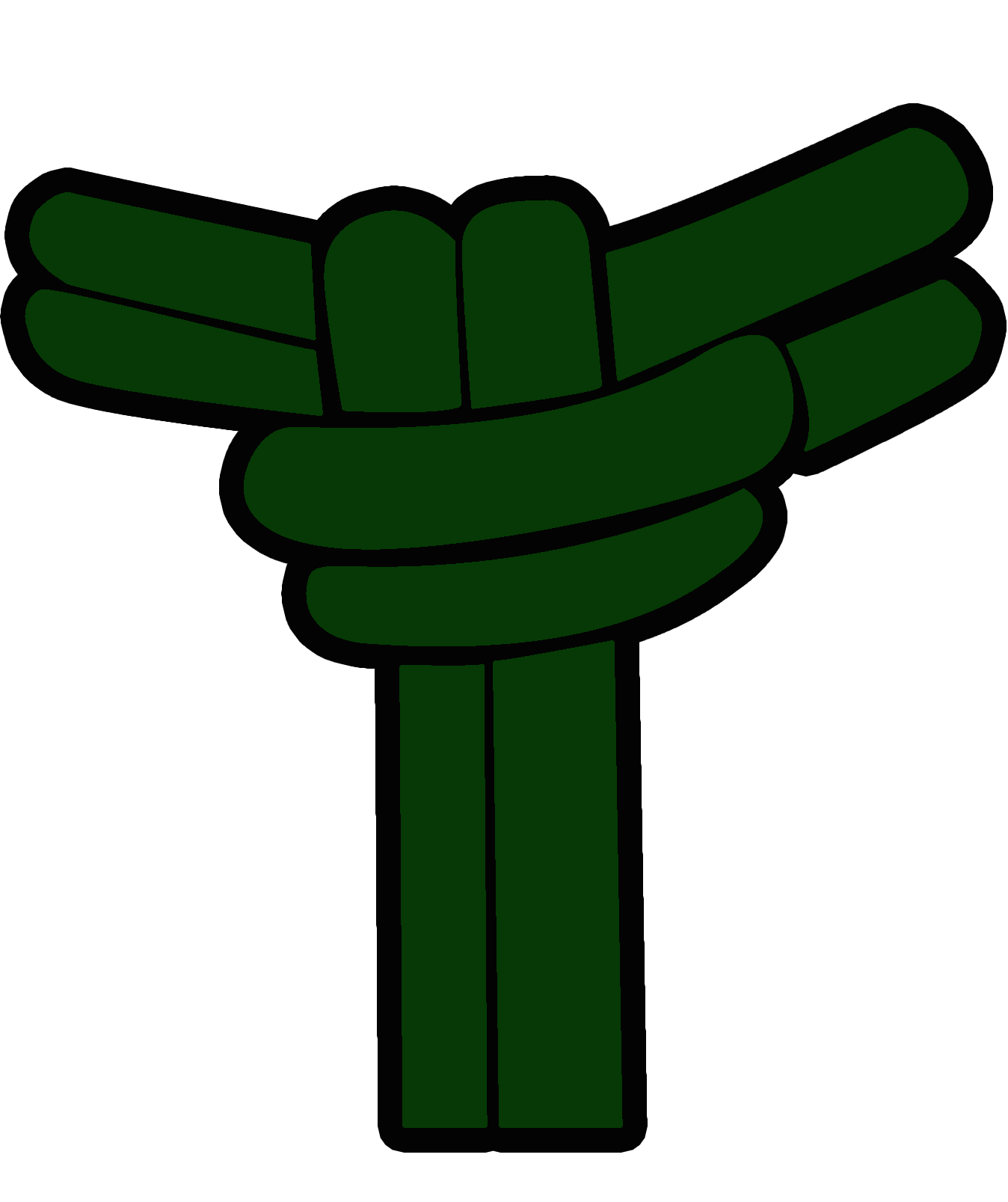
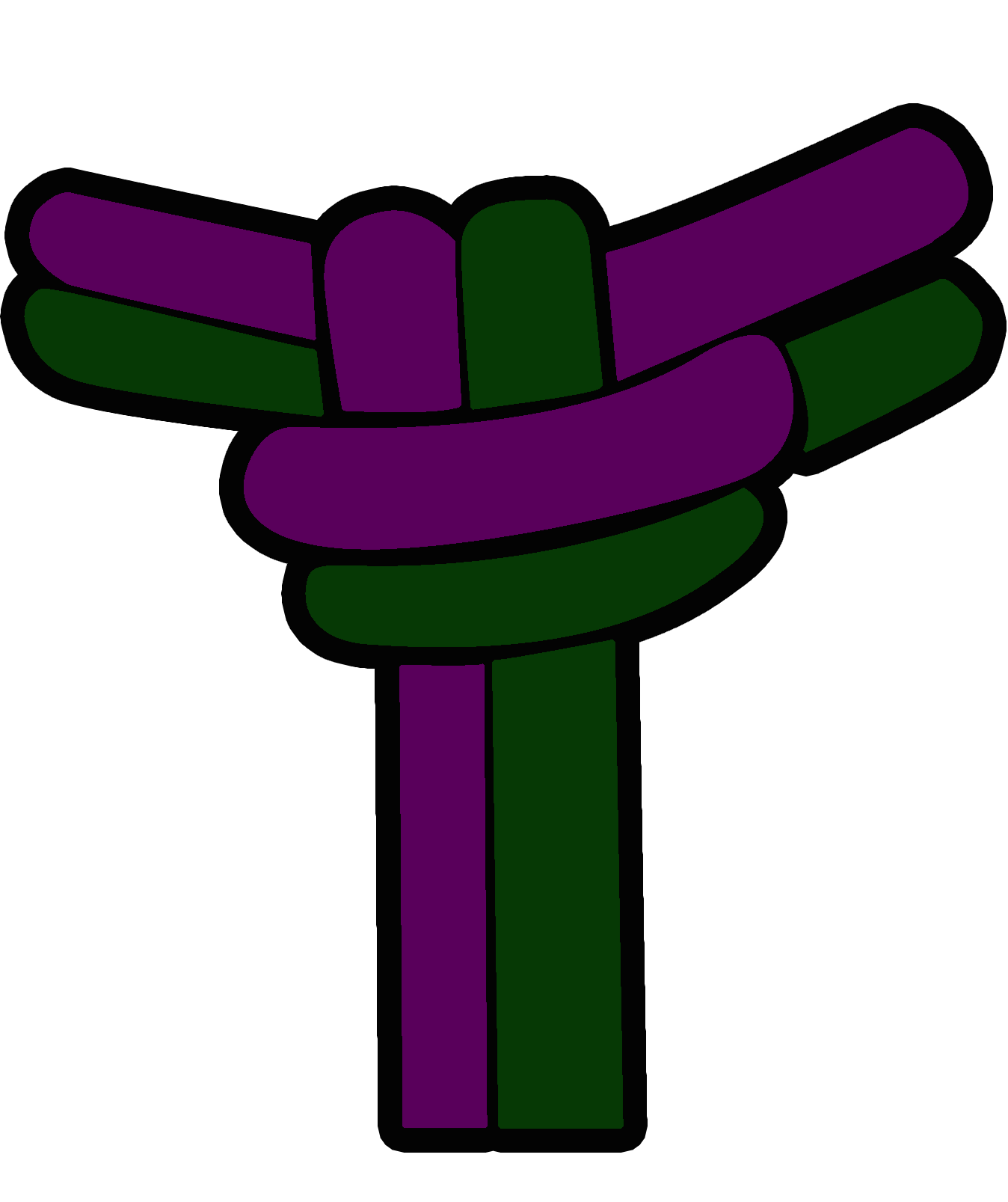
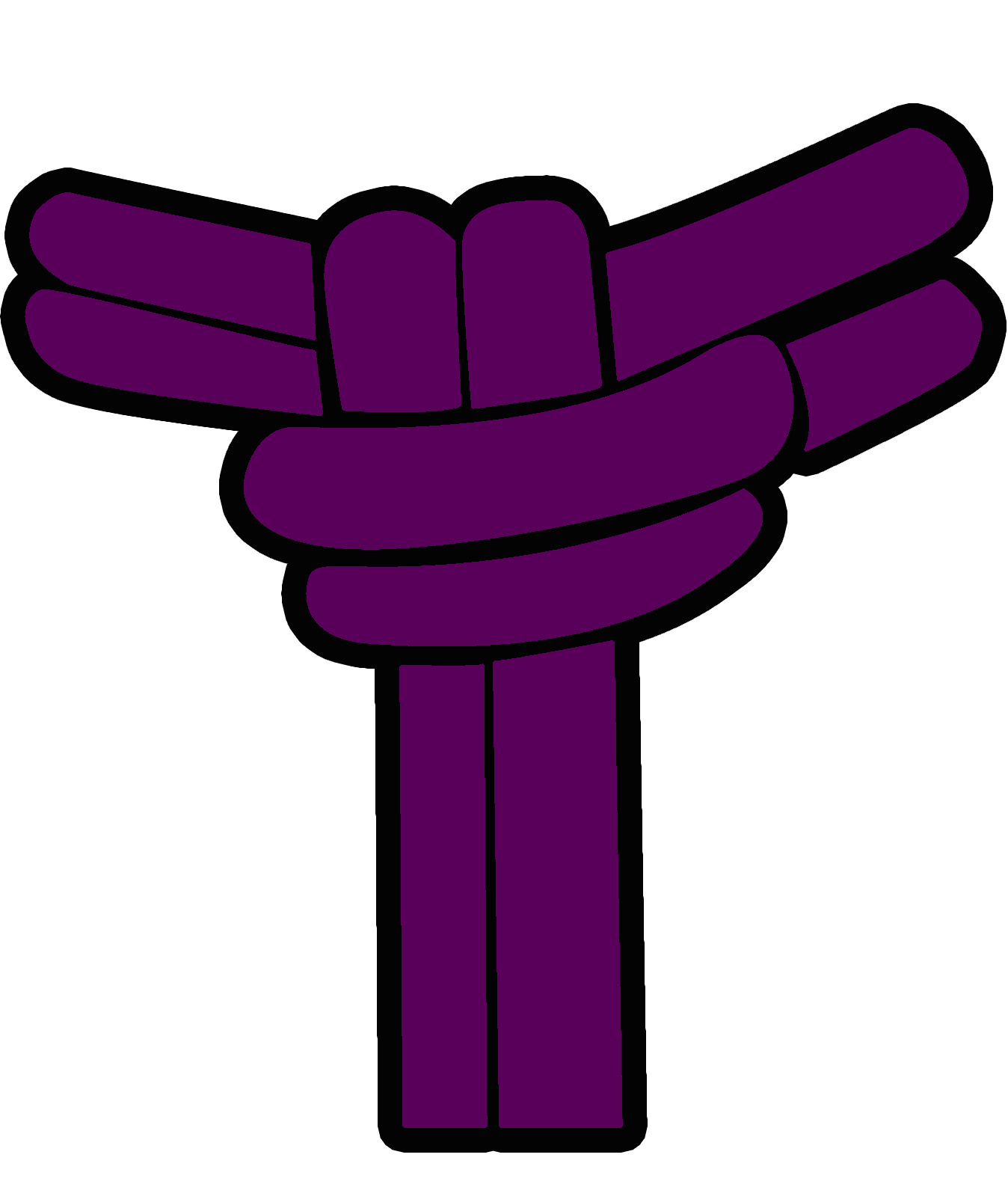
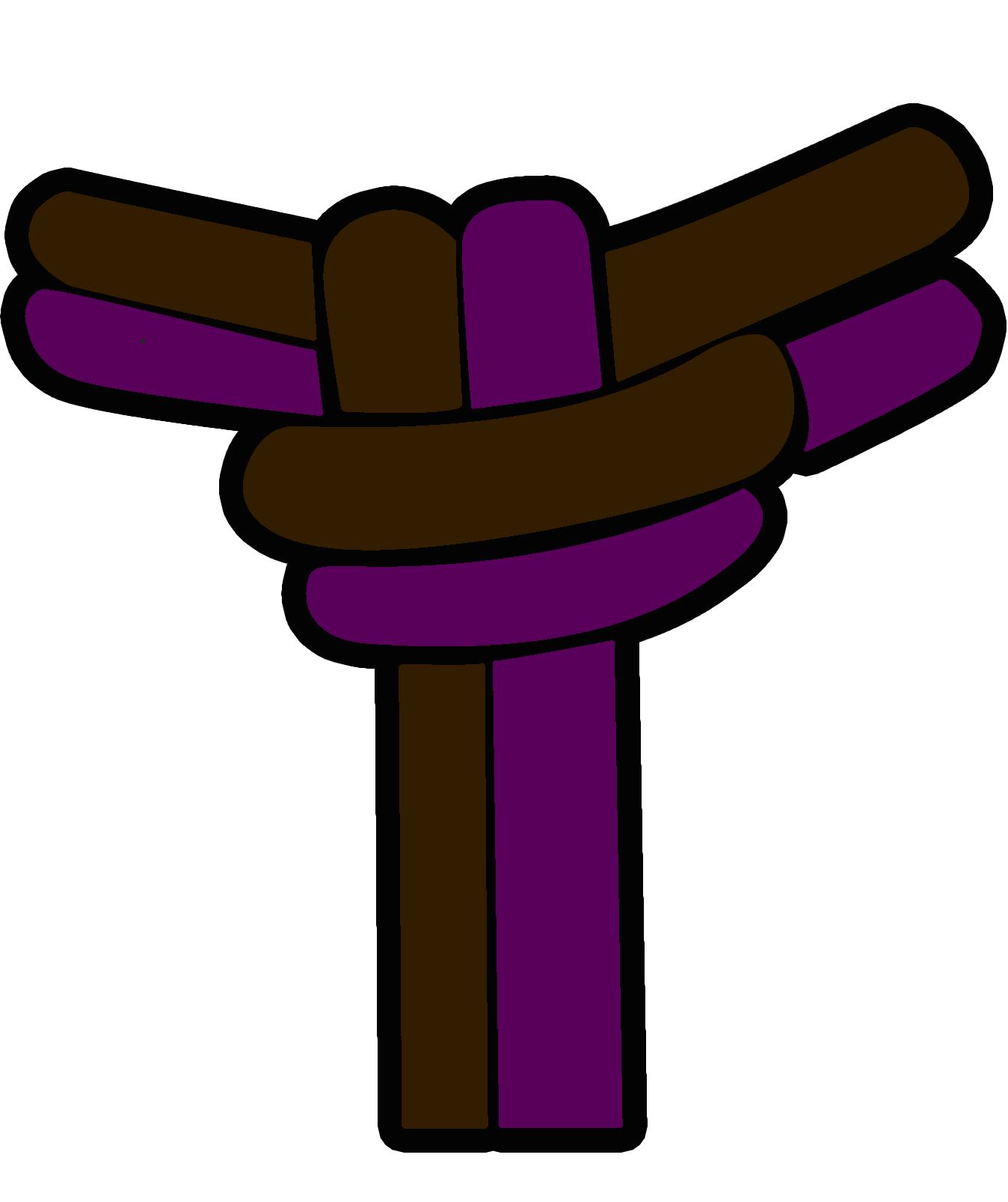
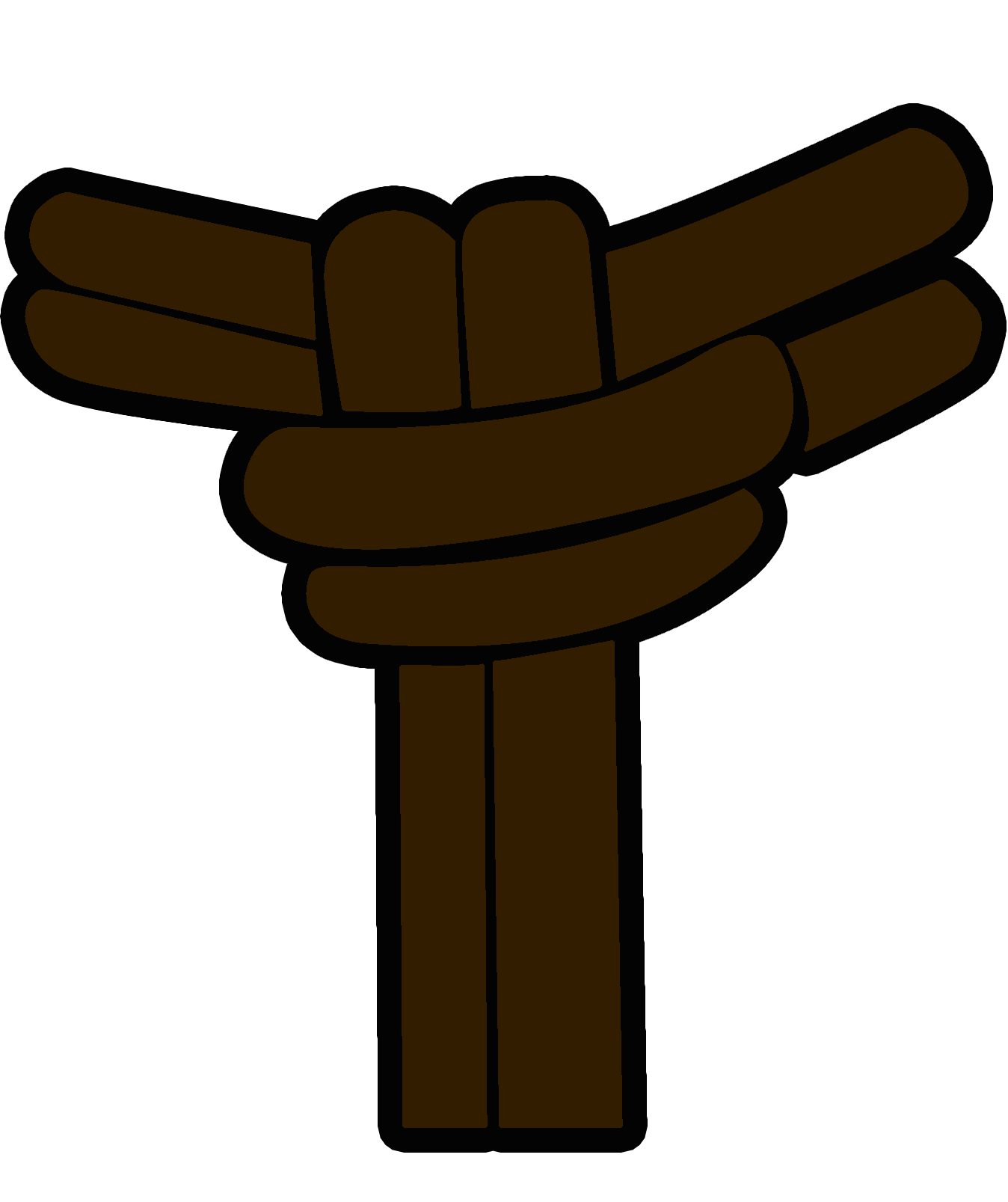
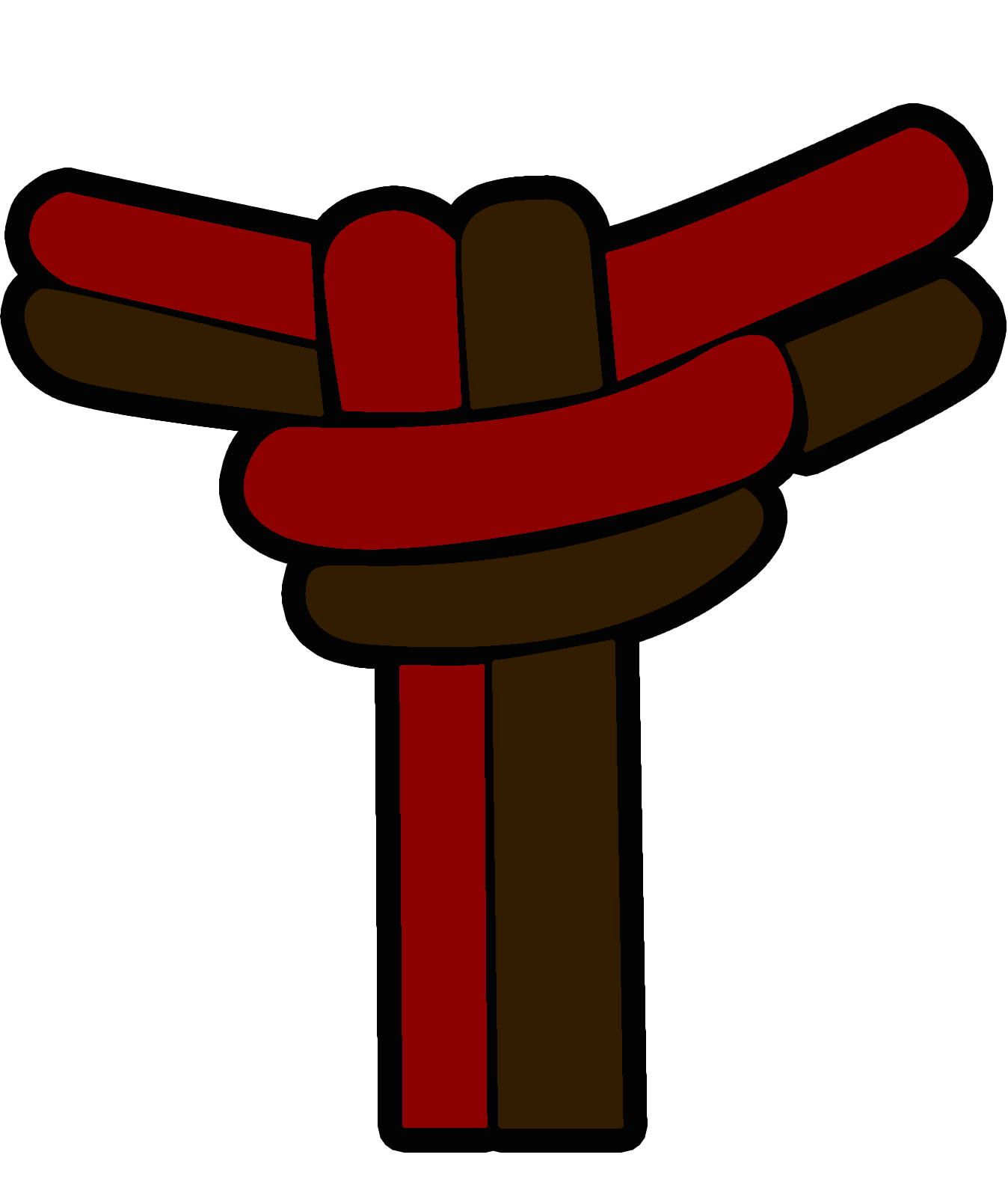
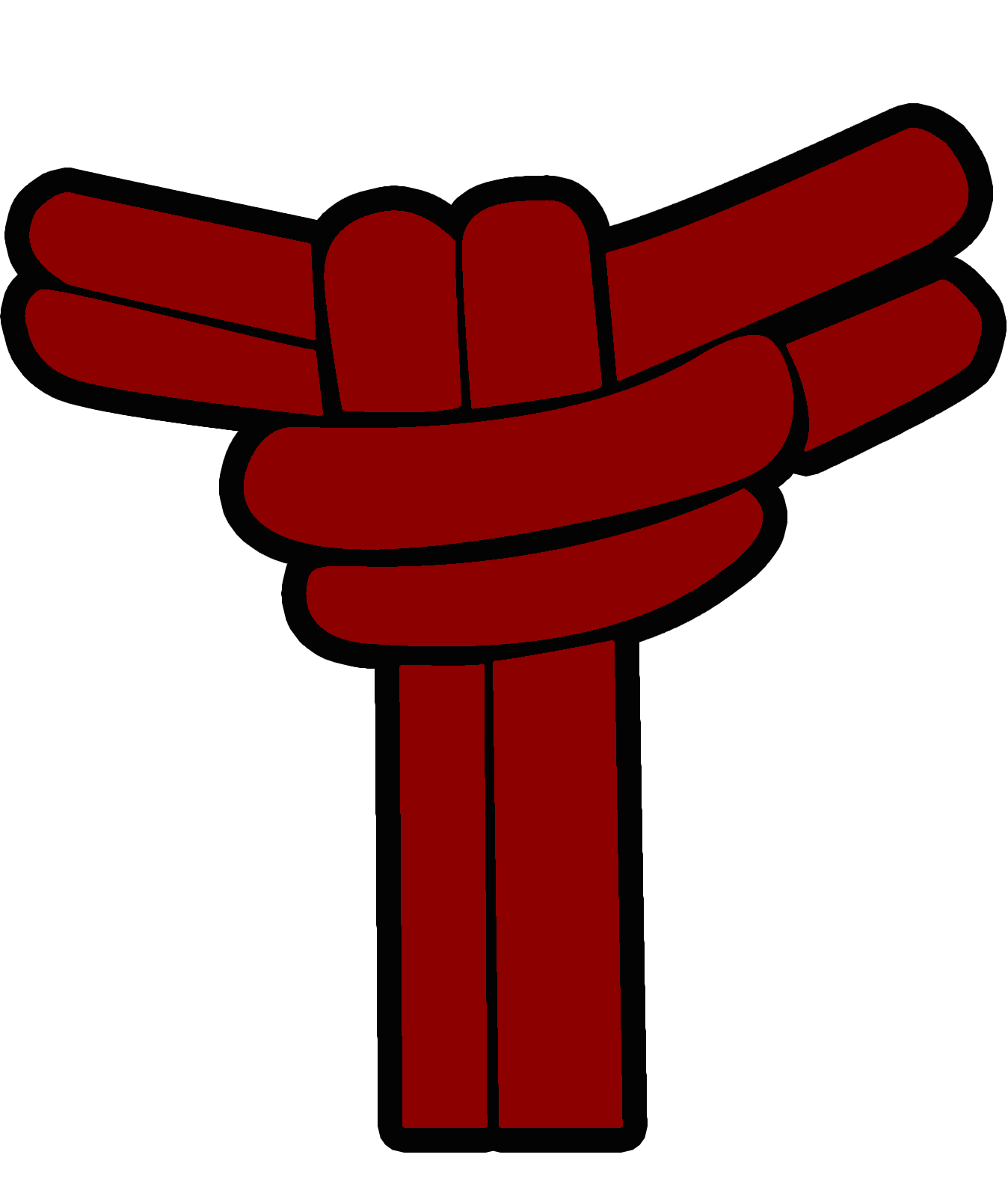
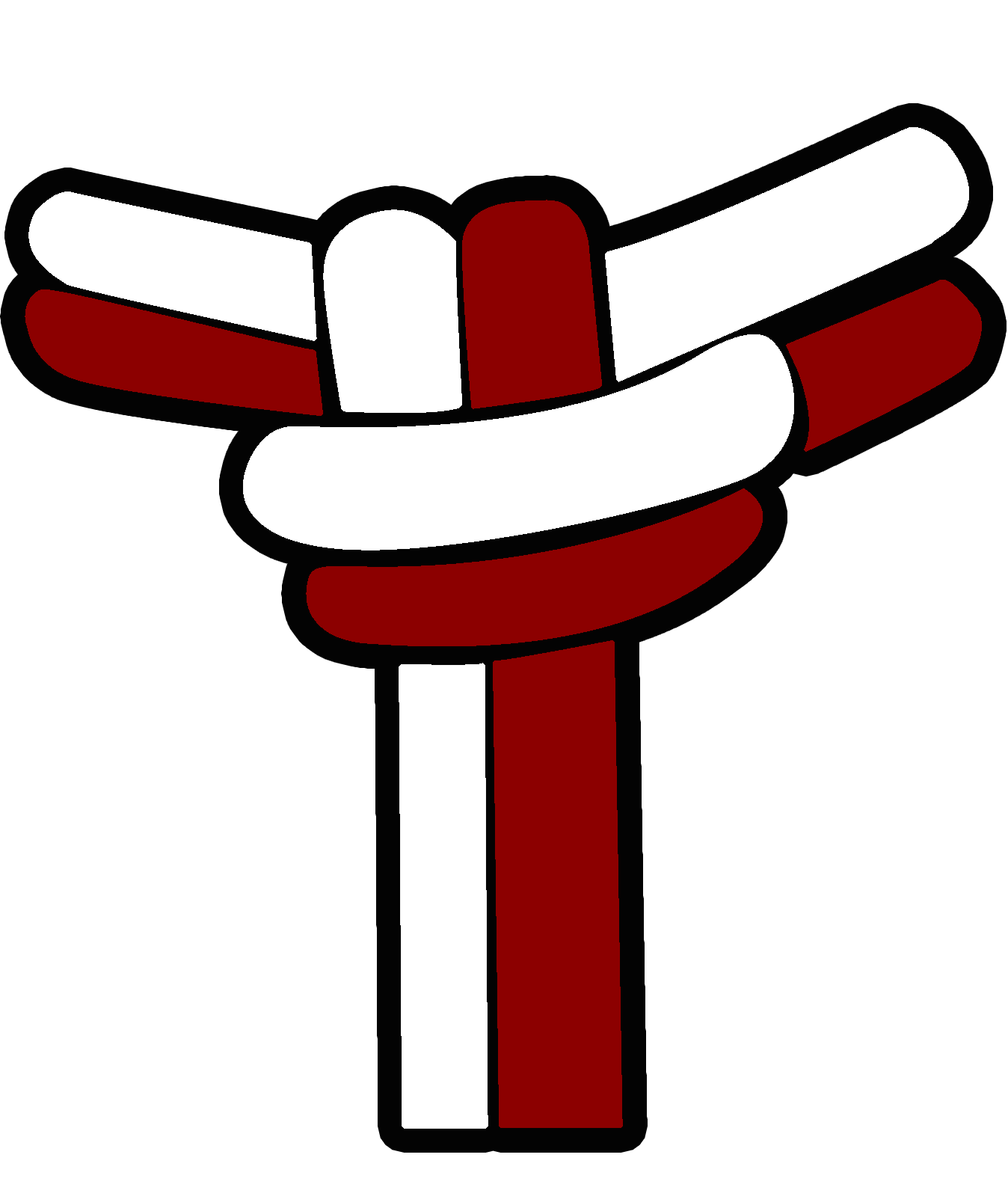
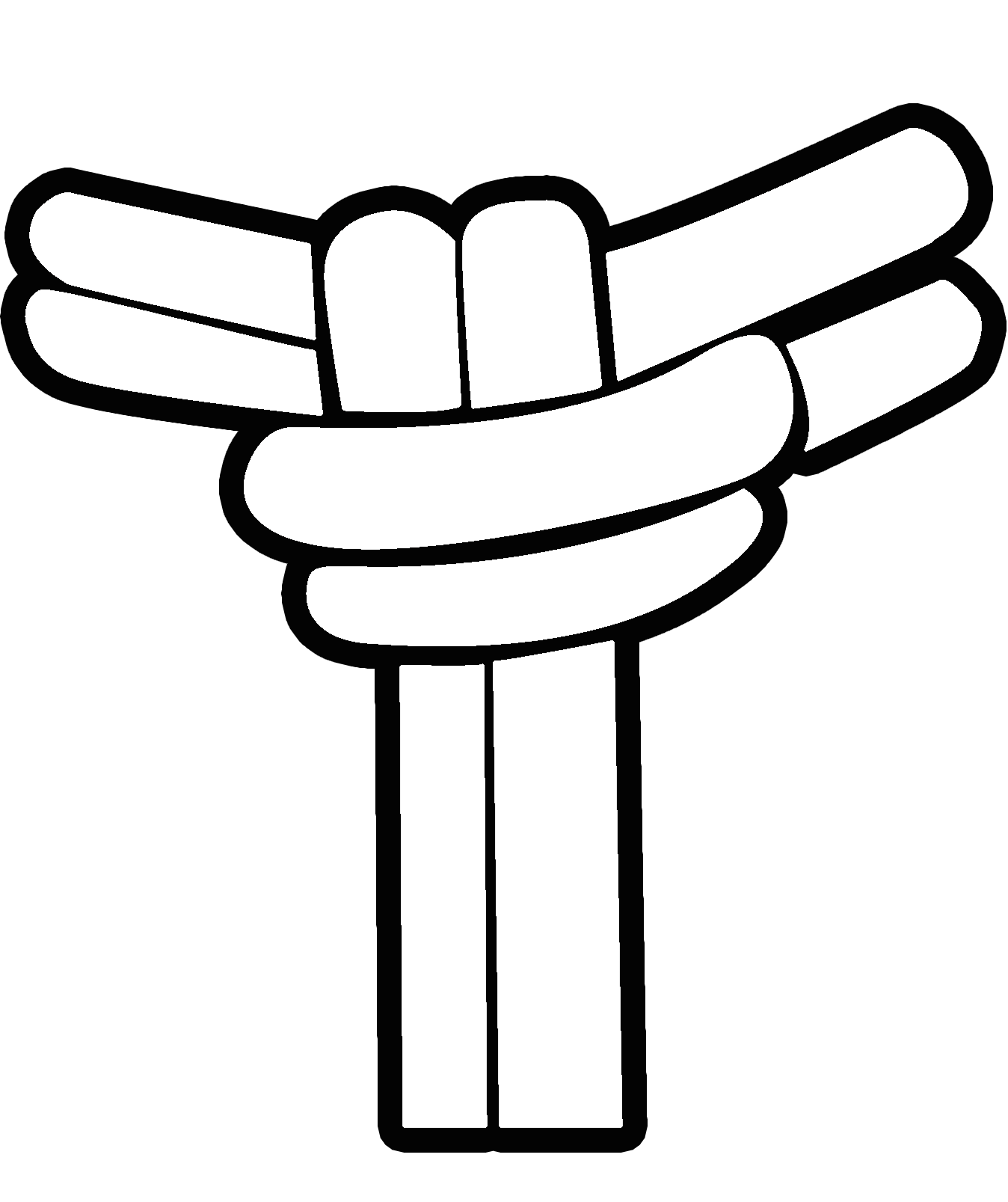
Title/Level		Cord Color	Basic Responsibilities
Beginner	Corda Crua - Capoeira	Corda Crua (Natural Cord)	natural cord student
Student; Aluno/a	Corda Amarela e Crua - Capoeira	Corda Crua-Amarela (Natural-Yellow Cord)	transformation
	Corda Amarela - Capoeira	Corda Amarela (Yellow Cord)	The Gold The yellow cord signifies the value of apprenticeship.
	Corda Amarela e Laranja - Capoeira	Corda Amarela-Laranja (Yellow-Orange Cord)	transformation
	Corda Laranja - Capoeira	Corda Laranja	The Sun The orange cord reflects the awakening of the apprentice’s consciousness.
	Corda Laranja e Azul - Capoeira	Corda Laranja-Azul (Orange-Blue Cord)	transformation
Graduado/a	Corda Azul - Capoeira, Graduado/a	Corda Azul (Blue Cord)	The Sea The blue cord indicates the apprentice’s awareness of the immense path ahead.
	Corda Azul e Verde - Capoeira, graduado/a	Corda Azul-Verde (Blue-Green Cord)	transformation
	Corda Verde - Capoeira, Graduado/a	Corda Verde (Green Cord)	The Forest—the world’s lungs The green cord signifies the consolidation of apprenticeship. It provides the base on which ABADÁ-Capoeira is built.
	Corda Verde e Roxa - Capoeira, Graduado/a	Corda Verde-Roxa (Green-Purple Cord)	transformation
Instrutor/a	Corda Roxa - Capoeira, Instrutor/a	Corda Roxa (Purple Cord)	The Amethyst The purple cord signals that the capoeirista has begun to overcome the physical, psychological, and spiritual pain of learning capoeira and defending its ideals.
	Corda Roxa e Marrom - Capoeira, Instrutor/a	Corda Roxa-Marrom (Purple-Brown Cord)	transformation
Professor/a	Corda Marrom - Capoeira, Professor/a	Corda Marrom (Brown Cord)	The Chameleon The brown cord represents the constant transformation that characterizes the group’s style.
	Corda Marrom e Vermelha - Capoeira, Professor/a	Corda Marrom-Vermelha (Brown-Red Cord)	transformation
Mestrando/a	Corda Vermelha - Capoeira, Mestrando/a	Corda Vermelha (Red Cord)	The Ruby The red cord symbolizes justice. At this level, the capoeirista acquires an understanding of responsibility; he or she is expected to strive for justice in conducting his work and making her decisions.
Mestre		Corda Vermelha-Branca (Red-White Cord)	transformation In this graduation the Capoeirista tries to develop their potential in order to concentrate and maintain ABADÁ's ideals. It is a phase of transformation, because the Mestre is preparing to obtain the highest graduation in ABADÁ's system. In order to achieve Grão-Mestre, it is necessary to make decisions with precision, honesty and above all with wisdom and impartiality.
Mestre	Corda Branca - Capoeira, Mestre	Corda Branca (White Cord)	The Diamond The "Diamond" is the hardest and most resilient mineral. It reflects all colors and all colors are united in white.
Grão Mestre	No cord (All white dress/suit)	Honorary designation	No cord From the Grão-Mestre, ABADÁ is given its support in order to preserve its ideals. It is through the wisdom, patience, humility, loyalty, and firm beliefs of the Grão-Mestre that ABADÁ can maintain its philosophy, tradition, and principles. There can only be one Grão-Mestre in ABADÁ. All attributes will be concentrated in this one person. The Grão-Mestre has the highest responsibility in conducting the fate of ABADÁ.

Children's graduation system (up to 9 years old)
Cord Colour	Translation	Picture	Age
Crua	Natural		1 year - 3 year
Pontas Crua e Amarela	Natural - Yellow tassels		3 years
Pontas Amarelas	Yellow tassels		4 years
Ponta Amarela e Laranja	Yellow - Orange tassels		5 years
Pontas Laranjas	Orange tassels		6 years
Ponta Laranja e Azul	Orange - Blue tassels		7 years
Pontas Azuls	Blue tassels		8 years
Amarela e Crua	Natural - Yellow cord	Amarela e Crua - Capoeira	9 years

Youth graduation system (9-16 years old)
Cord Colour	Translation	Picture
Amarela e Crua	Yellow - Natural	
Amarela	Yellow	
Laranja e Crua	Orange - Natural	
Amarela e Laranja	Yellow - Orange	
Laranja	Orange	
Azul e Crua	Blue - Natural	
Amarela e Azul	Yellow - Blue	
Laranja e Azul	Orange - Blue	

== See also ==
- Abadá
