= Abada (surname) =

- Language: French

Origin
- Meaning: "Abbot"
- Region of origin: Nice in France

Other names
- Variant forms: Abbatte, Abbat, Abbas, Abad and Abate

The French surname Abada traces its origins to a nickname. The surnames which derive from a nickname are numerous and varied. This category of name draws on many different sources. The most common ones are based on a physical characteristic or a personal attribute of the originator. In this case the name Abada was taken directly from the Niçard word Abbe meaning Abbot. Thus the surname Abada originates from someone who worked as an Abbot. Amongst the variants of this name we find Abbatte, Abbat, Abbas, Abad and Abate.

French surnames are hereditary, something that came back into fashion in the 12th century. Before this certain names existed and sometimes they were skipped for one, two or three generations. In contrast some names were not inherited because they were eventually abandoned and replaced by another name.

The surname Abada is also found in Italy. Amongst notable people of this name is the Italian painter Andre Abate (1652–1732).

Notable people with the surname include:

- Théodore Abada (1889–1974), French racing cyclist
- Patrick Abada (born 1954), French former pole-vaulter
- Omar Abada (born 1993), Tunisian basketball player
- Liel Abada (born 2001), Israeli footballer
