= Abaddon (disambiguation) =

Abaddon is a Biblical Hebrew word for "a place of destruction" and an archangel.

Abaddon or Abadon may also refer to:

== In arts and entertainment ==
=== Characters ===
- Abaddon (Supernatural), a powerful demon in the TV series Supernatural
- Matthew Abaddon, in the TV series Lost
- Abaddon, a Titan in the 2019 film Godzilla: King of the Monsters
- Abaddon, a demon in the TV series Haunted Hotel
- Abaddon, a junk dealer from "Alice" (Star Trek: Voyager)

=== Music ===
- Abaddon (Italian band)
- Abaddon (Polish band)
- Anthony "Abaddon" Bray, former drummer of the band Venom
- Abaddon (album), 2014, by Southern rapper Boondox

=== Other ===
- Abadon (novel), an 1893 work by Slovenian author Janez Mencinger
- Abaddón el exterminador ("Abbadon the Exterminator"), a 1974 novel by Ernesto Sabato
- Abaddon, a 1993 novel by American evangelist Bob Larson
- "Abaddon" (The Outer Limits), a season 6 episode of the second incarnation of The Outer Limits
- Abaddon (typeface), designed by Dave Nalle
- Abaddon Books, an imprint of Rebellion Developments
- "Abaddon", the pseudonym used by cartoonist Tom Parkinson-Morgan for Kill Six Billion Demons
- Abaddon Industries, Amy Jellicoe's employer in the HBO show Enlightened
- Abadon (wrestler), American professional wrestler
- CH-AA-10 Abaddon, NATO reporting name of the PL-15 air-to-air missile

== Other uses ==
- Abaddon despoliator, sole species of the genus Abaddon
