= Yalveh-ye Sofla =

Yalveh-ye Sofla يلوه سفلي
- Village
- Location within Iran
- Coordinates: 34°21′37″N 46°55′20″E
- Country: Iran
- Province: Kermanshah
- County: Kermanshah
- Bakhsh: Central
- Rural District: Baladarband

Population (2006)
  - Total: 67
- Time zone: UTC+3:30 (IRST)
  - Summer (DST): UTC+4:30 (IRDT)

Yalveh-ye Sofla (Persian: يلوه سفلي, also Romanized as Yalveh-ye Soflá; also known as Yalvā Pā'īn) is a village in Baladarband Rural District, in the Central District of Kermanshah County, Kermanshah Province, Iran. At the 2006 census, its population was 67, in 14 families.
