= Ayşegül Abadan =

Turkish pianist (1980–2022)

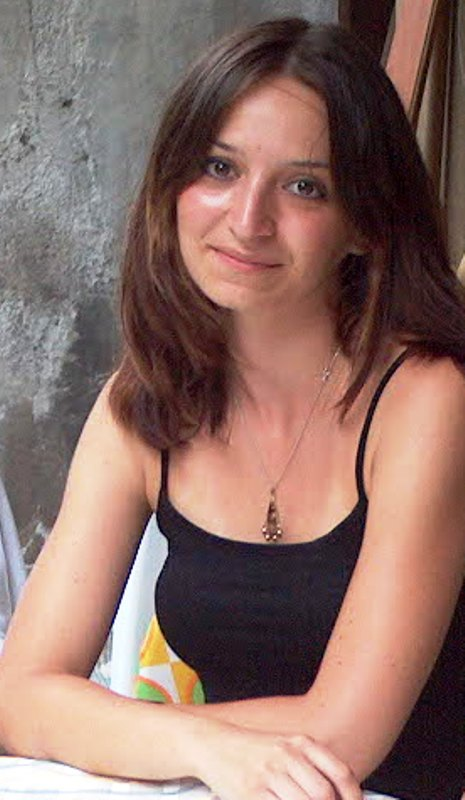

Background information
- Born: June 21, 1980
- Origin: Ankara, Turkey
- Died: 20 January 2022 (aged 41)
- Genres: Classical
- Occupation: Pianist
- Instruments: Piano, harpsichord, organ
- Years active: 1996–2022

Ayşegül Abadan (21 June 1980, Ankara – 20 January 2022, Istanbul) was a Turkish pianist.

== Biography ==
Ayşegül Abadan was born in Ankara in 1980. She is the daughter of musician Oğuz Abadan.

She moved to Istanbul with her family when one year old. Her musical life began when she started playing the piano during her primary school years. Ayşegül recorded the sound for some albums while 9 years old. She sang more songs for TV shows and did vocals for some TV serials. After graduating as a pianist from the musical department of Istanbul High School for Fine Arts, she continued her education in the Piano Department of the Faculty of Fine Arts and Design in Yıldız Technical University. In 2010, she founded her own music school: Aysegul Abadan Music & Art Office. There, she offered piano instruction. She succumbed to brain cancer in 2019 and died on 20 January 2022 in Istanbul. Her body was buried in the Habibler Plateau Cemetery.

== Career ==
=== As Teacher ===
2016/2022 Oğuz Abadan Mtsm (Director)
2010/2016 Aysegul Abadan Music & Art Office (As Founder)
2007/2010 Yamaha Music School Turkey - (JMC Programme)
2007/2008 Doga College (Choir & piano)
2006/2007 Moda Academy (Piano)
2004/2006 Mini Pati Pedagogic Dance & Kids Art House (Piano)
2000/2001 Sehit Er Ersin Günes Primary School
1999/2000 Popart Art Center (Piano-Ankara)
1998/1999 Oguz Abadan Guzel Sanatlar Merkezi (Piano)
1997/1998 Jazz-Stop Müzik Atelier (Piano)

=== As Pianist ===
2009 Musical "A Funny Thing Happened On The Way To The Forum" (Korepetitor & Pianist)
2008 Swiss Hotel Istanbul (Pianist)
2007 Oğuz Abadan Project (Pianist)
2007 Çırağan Palace/Gazebo
2006/2007 Sürmeli Otel
2005/2006 Ramada Plaza
2006 12. International Istanbul Barok Festival (Piano, Klavsen)
2004 Zerrin Özer Band (Back vocal)
2004 MSU Tango Show (Piyano)
2002 Robert College Local, Bizim Tepe Organisations (Keyboard)
2001 Harun Kolçak-Bendeniz, Anatolian Concerts (Keyboard)
2001 Oğuz Abadan Orchestra (by Zerrin Özer) (Keyboard)
2000 Popsav Orchestra (Keyboard)
1995 KASDAV (Kadıköy Bel. Sag. Ve Sos. Dayanışma Vakfı) Music Contest Concert (Piano)

== Albums ==
Ayşegül Abadan recorded three albums so far.

- Ayşegül'ün Doğumgünü The Birthday Of Ayşegül
- Ayşegül Tatilde Ayşegül On Holiday
- Ayşegül ve Yağız - Kırmızı Şemsiye The Red Umbrella
