= MT Abadan =

History
- Name: Empire Anglesey (1945-46); Abadan (1946-61); Renee J (1961-69)
- Owner: Ministry of War Transport (1945-46); A/S Tankskib Rederiet, Copenhagen, Denmark (1946-61); Celtic Coasters Ltd, Ireland (1961-69)
- Operator: Owner operated except:-; C Rowbotham & Sons (1945-46); K V Tersling (1946-61)
- Port of registry: (United Kingdom) Goole (1945-46); (Denmark) Copenhagen (1946-61); (Republic of Ireland) Dublin (1961-69)
- Builder: J Harker Ltd, Knottingley
- Yard number: 169
- Launched: 16 June 1945
- Completed: October 1945
- Out of service: March 1969
- Identification: UK Official Number 180993 (1945-46); Code letters GKGX (1945-46)
- Fate: Scrapped in Cork, March 1969

General characteristics
- Tonnage: 288 GRT
- Length: 136 ft 4 in (41.55 m)
- Beam: 21 ft 5 in (6.53 m)
- Draught: 8 ft 5 in (2.57 m)
- Propulsion: 1 x 6-cylinder 2SCSA diesel engine (Crossley Ltd, Manchester)

Abadan was a 288-ton coastal tanker which was built as Empire Anglesey in 1945. She was renamed Abadan in 1946 and Renee J in 1961. She served until 1969 when she was scrapped in Cork

== History ==
Empire Anglesey was built by J Harker Ltd, Knottingley as yard number 169. She was launched on 16 June 1945 and completed in October 1945. Empire Anglesey was built for the Ministry of War Transport and operated under the management of the C Rowbotham & Sons. She was homeported in Goole. she was powered by a 6-cylinder 2-stroke Single Cycle Single Action diesel engine made by Crossley Ltd, Manchester.

Empire Anglesey was sold to A/S Tankskibsrederiet, Copenhagen, Denmark in 1946 and renamed Abadan. She operated under the management of K V Tersling and spent some time chartered to Rederi AB Reut, Kungsbacka, Sweden.

In 1961, Abadan was sold to Celtic Coasters Ltd, Dublin, Ireland and renamed Renee J. She served with them for eight years. She was scrapped in Cork in March 1969.

== Official number and code letters ==
Official Numbers were a forerunner to IMO Numbers.

Empire Anglesey had the UK Official Number 180993 and used the Code Letters GKGX.
