= Oğuz Abadan =

Turkish musician (born 1950)

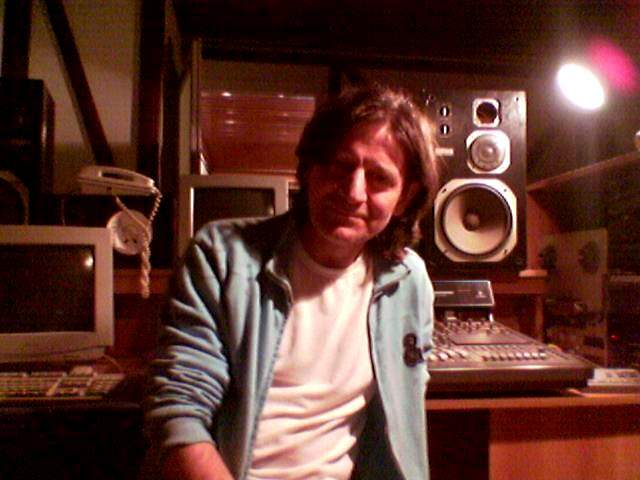
- Abadan in 2007

Background information
- Born: 12 June 1950 (age 75); Ankara, Turkey
- Genres: Pop, new-age
- Occupations: Songwriter, multi-instrumentalist, composer
- Instruments: Bass guitar, guitar
- Years active: 1971-present
- Website: Official website

Oğuz Abadan (born 12 June 1950) is a Turkish musician born in Ankara.

== Biography ==
After completing his education at Ankara's Gazi University Music Department as a violinist, he went to the United States to study harmony at Berklee College. In France he joined Moğollar (Mongols), a Turkish band in Paris.

He is the father of pianist Ayşegül Abadan.

== Books ==
- Teori 1- Notasyon ve Diziler (Teori 1) Pan Yayıncılık
- Teori 2- Aralıklar ve Akorlar (Teori 2) Pan Yayıncılık
