= Fereydoun Davatchi =

Fereydoun Davatchi is the director of Rheumatology Research Center (RRC) in Tehran University of Medical sciences.

Davatchi studied medicine in France and received d'Etat Diploma in Rheumatology from Paris University. He is currently full professor (Emeritus) of medicine in Tehran University of Medical Sciences. He established modern Rheumatology in Iran and trained most of the Iranian Rheumatologists who are working and researching Rheumatology in medical universities of Iran.

His main research field is Behcet's Disease.

Fereydoun Davatchi is the author of more than 90 peer-reviewed articles in international journals and several books in English and Persian.

Rheumatology Research Center is "The Center of Excellence for Rheumatology in Iran".

== See also ==
- Intellectual movements in Iran
- Leading research groups in Iran
