= Théodore Abada =

French cyclist

Personal information
- Born: 23 July 1889 Luceram, France
- Died: 2 December 1974 (aged 85) Nice, France

Cycling career
- Sport: Cycling
- Role: Rider

Théodore Abada (23 July 1889 – 2 December 1974) was a French racing cyclist. He rode in the 1920 Tour de France.
