= Abada (unicorn) =

Mythical animal in Kongo mythology

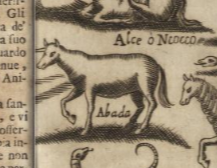
Illustration featured on page 60 of Girolamo Merolla's Breve, e succinta relazione del viaggio nel regno di Congo nell'Africa meridionale, fatto dal P. Girolamo Merolla da Sorrento, sacerdote Cappuccino missionario apostolico : continente variati clima, arie, animali, fiumi, frutti, vestimenti con proprie figure, diversita di costumi, e di viveri per l'uso umano.

In the Kongo language, Abada refers to a mythical animal similar to a unicorn. The Abada, however, has two crooked projections as opposed to a unicorn's single horn. The Abada's horns hang limp and soft when it is relaxed or sleeping, but harden when it feels threatened. These growths can act as an antidote to poison and disease. It is also claimed that natives would hunt the male Abadas in order to craft their shields from the animals' skins. The Abada is also known as Nillekma or Arase.

It has been described as being the size of a small donkey with the tail of a boar. In many tales, the Abada is said to appear during moments of hardship, such as when a traveler is lost or someone is gravely ill. Its arrival is viewed as a sign of good fortune and a supernatural source of hope.

Outside of Congolese folklore, the Abada is also found in Indonesian, Malay, and Tatar mythologies, in which the Abada is portrayed as a primarily female creature with a shy disposition.

== Etymology ==
it is believed the word "bada" is of either Malay or Arabic origin, "badak" being the modern term for both the rhinoceros and hippopotamus in modern Malay, often used interchangeably for the two animals. The Arabic term "ābida" (آبِدَة) translates to "wild animal".

"Badas" or "abadas" is the old Portuguese word for rhinoceros, although it was first used to describe a unicorn-like creature in the 17th century. The Capuchin missionary Giovanni Cavazzi da Montecuccolo claimed it was called the "Abada" by the local Congolese.

Although often compared to a unicorn, Jesuit author Balthazar Tellez recorded a quote from a Portuguese man who had lived in Abyssinia, distinguishing the concept of the Abada on account of its horns:

It is important that the unicorn is not to be confounded with the Abada, about which they usually dispute; This one may see by the difference of their names, as well as by the difference of their body and parts, and it would appear by the Abada which we have seen and by the unicorn which we have seen painted. The latter has a long straight horn of admirable virtue; The Abada has two crooked horns, which are not sovereign, although they will serve as antidotes against poison.
