= Abadan, Jalandhar =

Abadan
- Village
- Location in Punjab, India Abadan (India)
- Coordinates: 31.2786°N 75.5024°E
- Country: India
- State: Punjab
- District: Jalandhar

Languages
  - Official: Punjabi
- Time zone: UTC+5:30 (IST)
- Vehicle registration: PB- 08

Abadan is a village located in Jalandhar West community development block of Jalandhar - I tehsil, Jalandhar district, Punjab state, India.

== Geography ==
Abadan is located at a distance of 4 km from Lambran village, which is located on National Highway 703, old NH 71. Nearby villages are Kotla, Rasulpur Khurd, Sammipur and Kurali (Jalandhar), not to be confused with Kurali in SAS Nagar district. Total area of Abadan is 77 hectares (190 acres)

== Demographics ==
As per the 2011 Census of India, Abadan had 57 households with a total population of 319 of which 163 (51%) were males and 156 (49%) were females. Population below 6 years was 41. The literacy rate of Abadan village was 83.81% compared to 75.84% of Punjab. In Abadan Male literacy was 90.58% while female literacy rate was 77.14%. The sex ratio was 892 females per thousand males.

== Transport ==
The nearest railway station to Abadan is Jalandhar Railway station at a distance of 12 km.

== Postcode ==
Abadan's Post office is Lambran.
