= Fereydun, Kerman =

Fereydun فريدون
- Village
- Location within Iran
- Coordinates: 29°49′29″N 55°53′39″E
- Country: Iran
- Province: Kerman
- County: Sirjan
- Bakhsh: Pariz
- Rural District: Saadatabad

Population (2006)
  - Total: 56
- Time zone: UTC+3:30 (IRST)
  - Summer (DST): UTC+4:30 (IRDT)

Fereydun (Persian: فريدون, also Romanized as Fereydūn, Farīdun, and Fereidoon) is a village in Saadatabad Rural District, Pariz District, Sirjan County, Kerman Province, Iran. At the 2006 census, its population was 56, in 18 families.
