= Yalveh-ye Olya =

Yalveh-ye Olya يلوه عليا
- Village
- Location within Iran
- Coordinates: 34°21′53″N 46°56′27″E
- Country: Iran
- Province: Kermanshah
- County: Kermanshah
- Bakhsh: Central
- Rural District: Baladarband

Population (2006)
  - Total: 60
- Time zone: UTC+3:30 (IRST)
  - Summer (DST): UTC+4:30 (IRDT)

Yalveh-ye Olya (Persian: يلوه عليا, also Romanized as Yalveh-ye ‘Olyā; also known as Fereydūn and Yalvāy-e Fereydūn) is a village in Baladarband Rural District, in the Central District of Kermanshah County, Kermanshah Province, Iran. At the 2006 census, its population was 60, in 15 families.
