= Abadá =

Portuguese term for various types of clothing

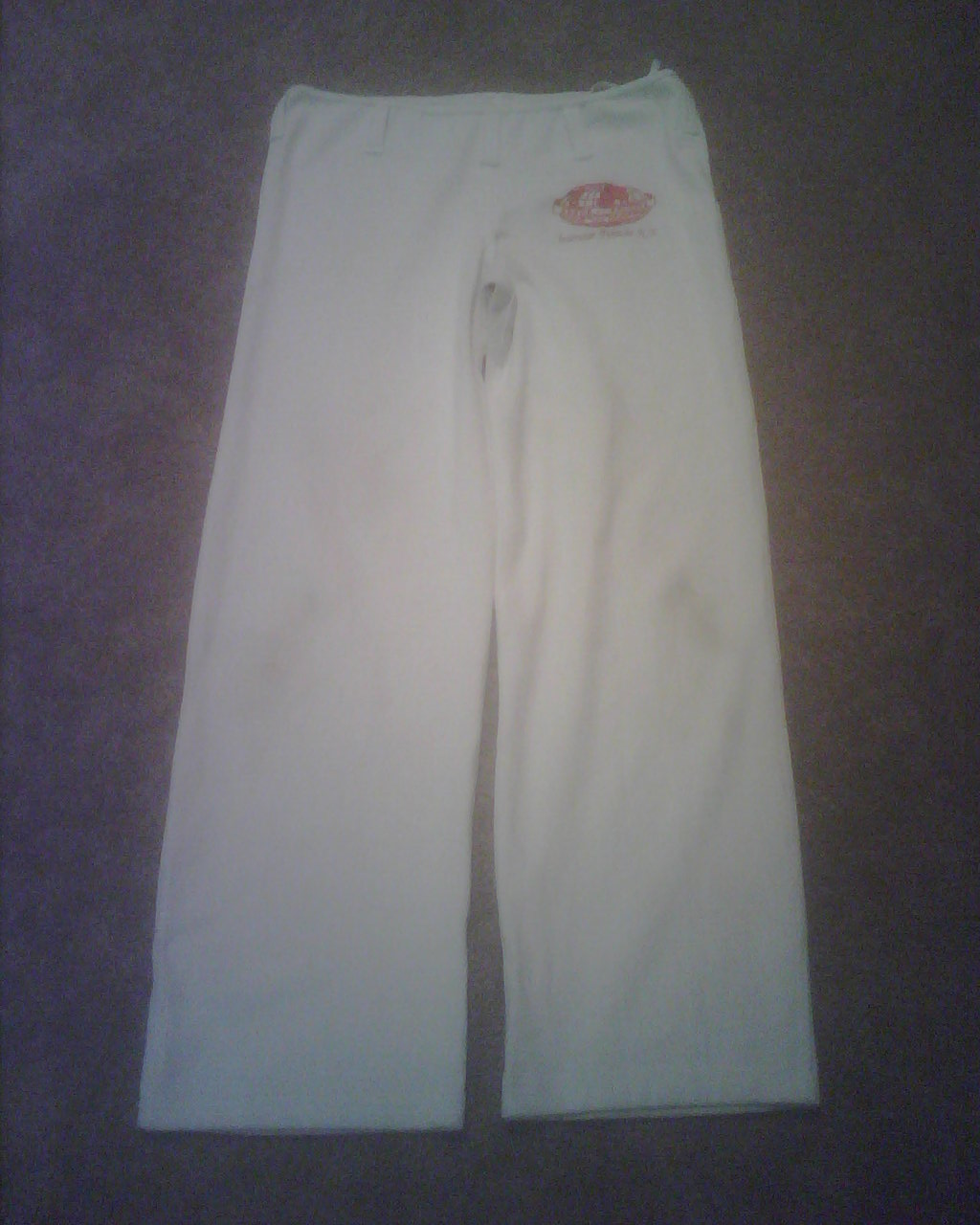
Abadás Capoeira pants

Abadá (Portuguese pronunciation: [abaˈda]) can refer to various items of clothing: a white tunic worn for prayer by African Muslims, the uniform of port workers in Brazil, the pants worn by capoeiristas, or a shirt sold at a carnival or theatrical production to promote the event. Its name comes from the Yoruba West African Agbada.

== Capoeira pants ==
Original abadás were white. Capoeira abadás are generally white and sport the Capoeira school's logo (usually on the left leg). However, there are generic abadás that some schools train in, reserving their uniform abadás for demonstrations. In addition, some Capoeira schools allow any exercise pants for training. Several schools stick to white as a symbol of purity, representing the pure martial art of Capoeira. It is also believed that the white color has religious ties, thus making it appropriate for Capoeira demonstrations. Many Capoeiristas believe that Capoeira is religious in nature, and give the highest form of respect to their martial art. Hence, the color white is used for their uniforms.

The founder of Capoeira Regional, Manuel dos Reis Machado, Mestre Bimba, chose white for the uniform, to show the uniforms of his students were clean. Dirt can be easily spotted on white clothes. Back in those days capoeira was judged to be the pastime of petty criminals and vagabonds. To show the uniform was clean, was to create a distance between his school and that common perception.

== Carnival shirts ==
Carnival abadás may be any kind of shirt, with arbitrary colors and logos.
