= Faridoon Abadan =

Abadan Faridoon Abadan (born 1946) is a Pakistani politician and former Provincial Minister of Balochistan. He formerly owned Quetta Distilleries. He has been missing since 2002.

== Politics ==
A Zoroastrian by faith, Abadan won two consecutive elections to the Provincial Assembly of Balochistan in 1985 and 1988 from a seat reserved for non-Muslim minorities; he served as a Minister in the government. His wife, Nilofer, stood in the 1990 elections from the same seat but lost to Sanat Singh, a Sikh; in the next election, Abadan contested himself but lost to Singh. Nevertheless, he served as a special assistant to the two chief ministers — Jam Ghulam Qadir Khan and Zulfiqar Ali Khan Magsi — during these years.

== Kidnapping ==
On 17 February 2002, Abadan left his house to have dinner at a friend's place but never returned; he was believed to have been kidnapped, and his fate remains unknown. A decade later, in March 2011, his wife was abducted but returned after ten months on payment of 30 million PKR as ransom. The family has since shifted to Karachi.
