= Mineko =

- Gender: Female

Origin
- Origin: Japanese
- Meaning: Different meanings depending on the kanji used

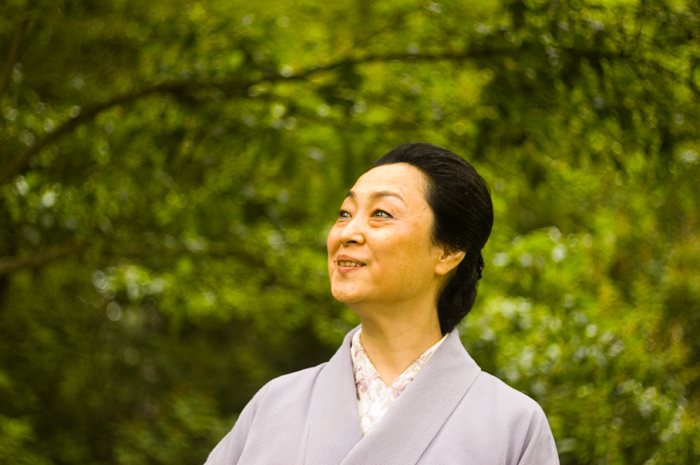
The portrait of Mineko Iwasaki, Moscow, 2008, June 21st

Mineko (written: 峰子, 美猫 or 美音子) is a feminine Japanese given name. Notable people with the name include:

- Mineko Fujishima (藤島 美音子), Japanese member of band Swinging Popsicle
- Mineko Grimmer (born 1949), Japanese sound artist
- Mineko Iwasaki (岩崎 峰子; born 1949), Japanese businesswoman and writer
- Mineko Nishikawa (仁支川 峰子; born 1958), Japanese actress and singer
- Mineko Nomachi (能町 みね子; born 1979), Japanese essayist, columnist, illustrator, and radio and television personality
- Mineko Ohkami (押上 美猫), Japanese manga artist
- Mineko Tanaka (田中 美音子; born 1975), Japanese handball player
- Mineko Ueda (上田 三根子; born 1949), Japanese illustrator
