= Fujishima =

Fujishima may refer to one of the following.

== Places ==
- Fujishima, Yamagata, former Japanese town
- Fujishima Station, Japanese train station
- Fujishima High School, a Japanese high school in Fukui, Japan
- Fujishima Shrine, a Japanese shrine in Fukui, Japan

== People ==
- Akira Fujishima, Japanese chemist
- Kaho Fujishima, Japanese singer
- Kōsuke Fujishima, Japanese manga artist
- Mary Yasuko Fujishima (1927-2021), Japanese businessperson
- Mineko Fujishima, the vocal of the Swinging Popsicle indie pop/rock band from Japan
- Fujishima Takeji, Japanese artist
- Tsuneoki Fujishima (1829–1898), Japanese artist
- Retirement name of sumo wrestlers, heads of the Fujishima stable
  - Akinoumi Setsuo
  - Musōyama Masashi
