= SERVO Magazine =

Monthly robotics publication

- Editor: Dave Prochnow
- Categories: Technology
- Frequency: Monthly
- Publisher: T & L Publications, Inc
- Founded: 2003
- Country: United States
- Based in: North Hollywood, California
- Website: www.servomagazine.com
- ISSN: 1546-0592

SERVO Magazine is a monthly robotics publication produced by T&L Publications. The first issue appeared in November 2003. SERVO Magazine was a primary sponsor behind the Tetsujin competition, a contest where teams were challenged to design robotic exoskeletons capable of lifting weights.

== Columns ==
SERVO Magazine has a number of recurring columns that deal with various areas of robotics:

- Mind/Iron, an editorial column with new authors virtually every month.
- Twin Tweaks, a column dedicated to "hacking" robotics kits and imbuing them with new abilities.
- Rubberbands and Bailing Wire, a column concerned with various electronics modifications that can be made to robots.
- Lessons From The Laboratory, a column directed at a younger age group that features various projects with the LEGO Mindstorms robotics kit.
- Combat Zone, a column that deals specifically with combat robotics and competitions.
- Brain Matrix, a table of information on a variety of subjects, ranging from servo motors to batteries.
- Ask Mr. Roboto, essentially in the form of an advice column, where readers write in with robotics projects related problems and questions.
- Robytes, a short column that showcases interesting tidbits from the robotics world, ranging from new military projects to the creations of rogue tinkerers.
- Menagerie, a short column where readers send in descriptions and pictures of their personal projects.
- Then and Now, a column that recalls robots from the past.
- Appetizer, a column at the end of the magazine that also is written by new authors every month. Topics range from the serious to the frivolous.

== Sponsorship ==
SERVO Magazine has been an active member of the robotics community, sponsoring such events as the FIRST Robotics Competition, the Robonexus robotics convention, and the Tetsujin robotics competition.
