= Facebook F8 =

Facebook conference for developers and entrepreneurs

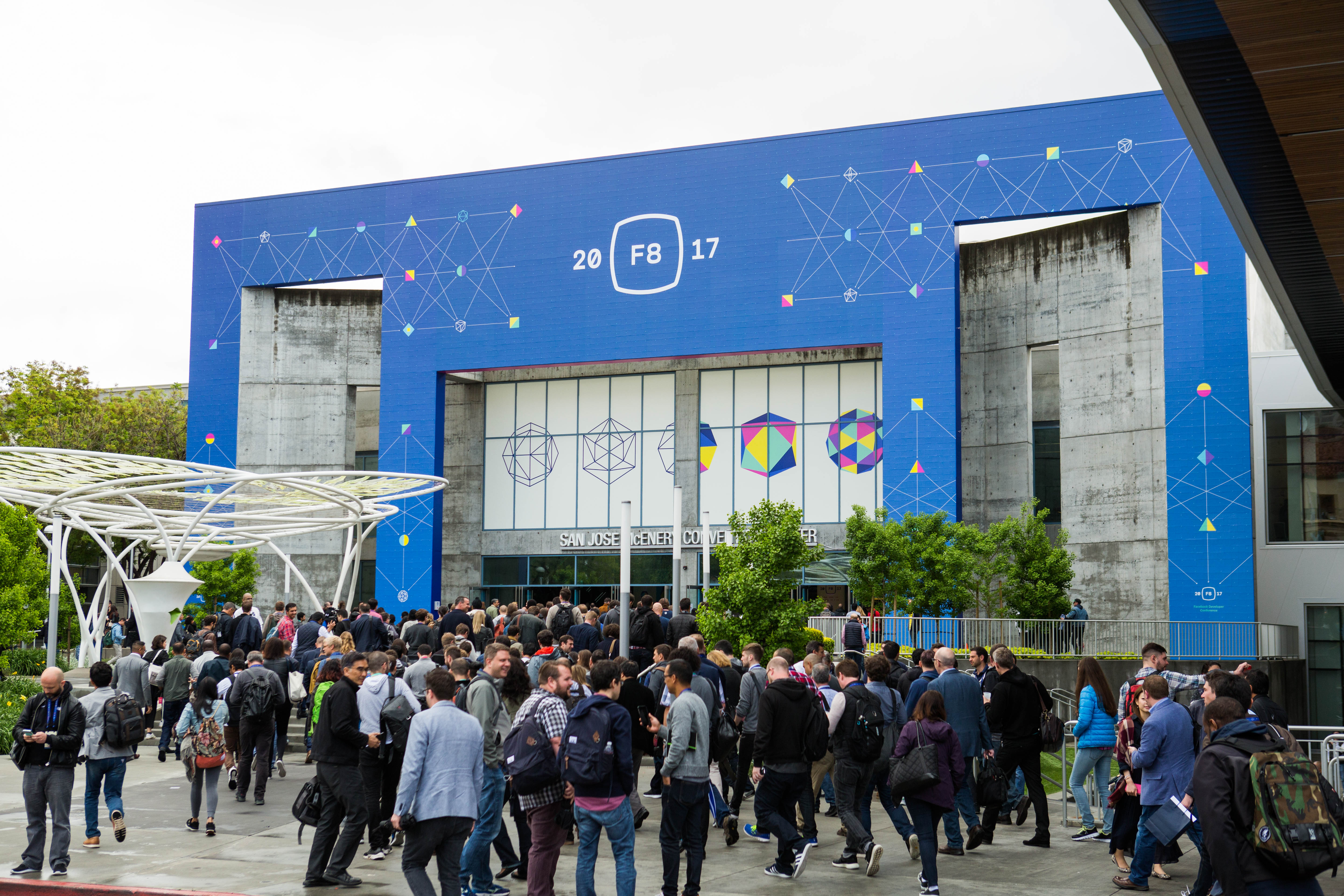
- Facebook F8 2017 at McEnery Convention Center in San Jose, California
- Frequency: Yearly (except 2009, 2012, 2013 and 2022)
- Venue: San Francisco Design Center (2007–08 and 2010) Fort Mason Center (2015); San Jose McEnery Convention Center (2017–19) Online (2020–21)
- Locations: San Francisco, California, US (2007–08, 2010–11 and 2014–16) San Jose, California, US (2017–19) Digital conference (2020–21)
- Founded: 2007
- Most recent: June 2–3, 2021
- Organizer: Meta Platforms
- Website: f8.com

Facebook F8 was a mostly-annual conference held by Meta Platforms (formerly Facebook) from 2007 to 2021, intended for developers and entrepreneurs who build products and services around the website. The event generally started with a keynote speech by Facebook founder Mark Zuckerberg, followed by various breakout sessions concentrating on specific topics. Facebook often introduced new features and made new announcements at the conference.

The "F8" name comes from Facebook's tradition of 8 hour hackathons.

Facebook F8 was hosted in San Francisco, California from 2007 to 2016, then in a more central Silicon Valley location in San Jose, California from 2017 to 2019. In 2020 and 2021, it was a virtual event due to the COVID-19 pandemic. There was no F8 event in 2009, 2012, 2013. Starting 2022 the event was replaced by a new conference format called "Conversations", focusing more on business topics.

== 2007 ==
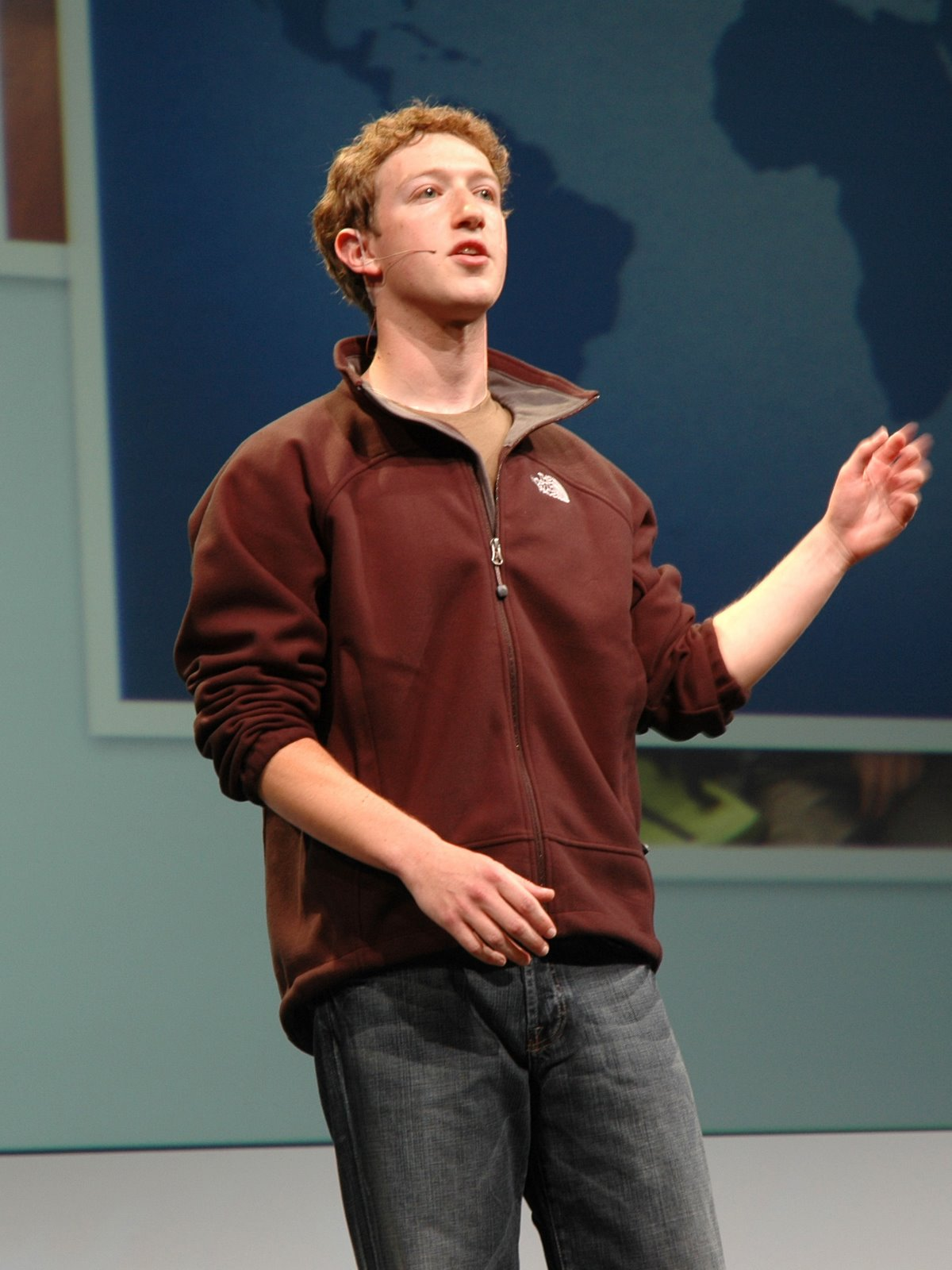
Mark Zuckerberg at Facebook's first F8 event in 2007

The first F8 event was held on May 24, 2007, at the San Francisco Design Center in San Francisco. The notion of the social graph was introduced.

== 2008 ==
The 2008 F8 event was held on July 23, 2008, at the San Francisco Design Center once again. News and announcements from this event included:

- Introducing the New Facebook Profile & More
- Integrating Facebook Connect into your Website

== 2010 ==
The 2010 F8 event was held on April 21, 2010, at the San Francisco Design Center. The main announcement was the feature to add a “Like” button to any piece of content on a website by the owner. This feature is now integrated within around 2.5 million websites worldwide, with 10,000 more being added daily.

Additional news and announcements included:

- Social Plugins (e.g. Like button)
- Open Graph Protocol
- Graph API
- OAuth 2.0

== 2011 ==
F8 2011 was held on September 22, 2011. Various things Facebook introduced at the conference included a new profile redesign named 'Timeline' that showed a history of user's activity on their profile, and a broader, more advanced version of the 'Open Graph' protocol.

The F8 2011 event was mainly focused on introducing new products, transforming industries, building and growing social applications and product Q&A. Some of the details of the topics were:

- The Future of Digital Music
- Mobile + Social
- The Rise of Social Gaming
- Investing in Social
- Developing Products at Facebook
- Social Design
- Distribution: Growing on Facebook
- Marketing on Facebook
- Hack Better: New Tools for Developers
- Inside HTML5 Development at Facebook
- Making Fast Social Apps

== 2014 ==
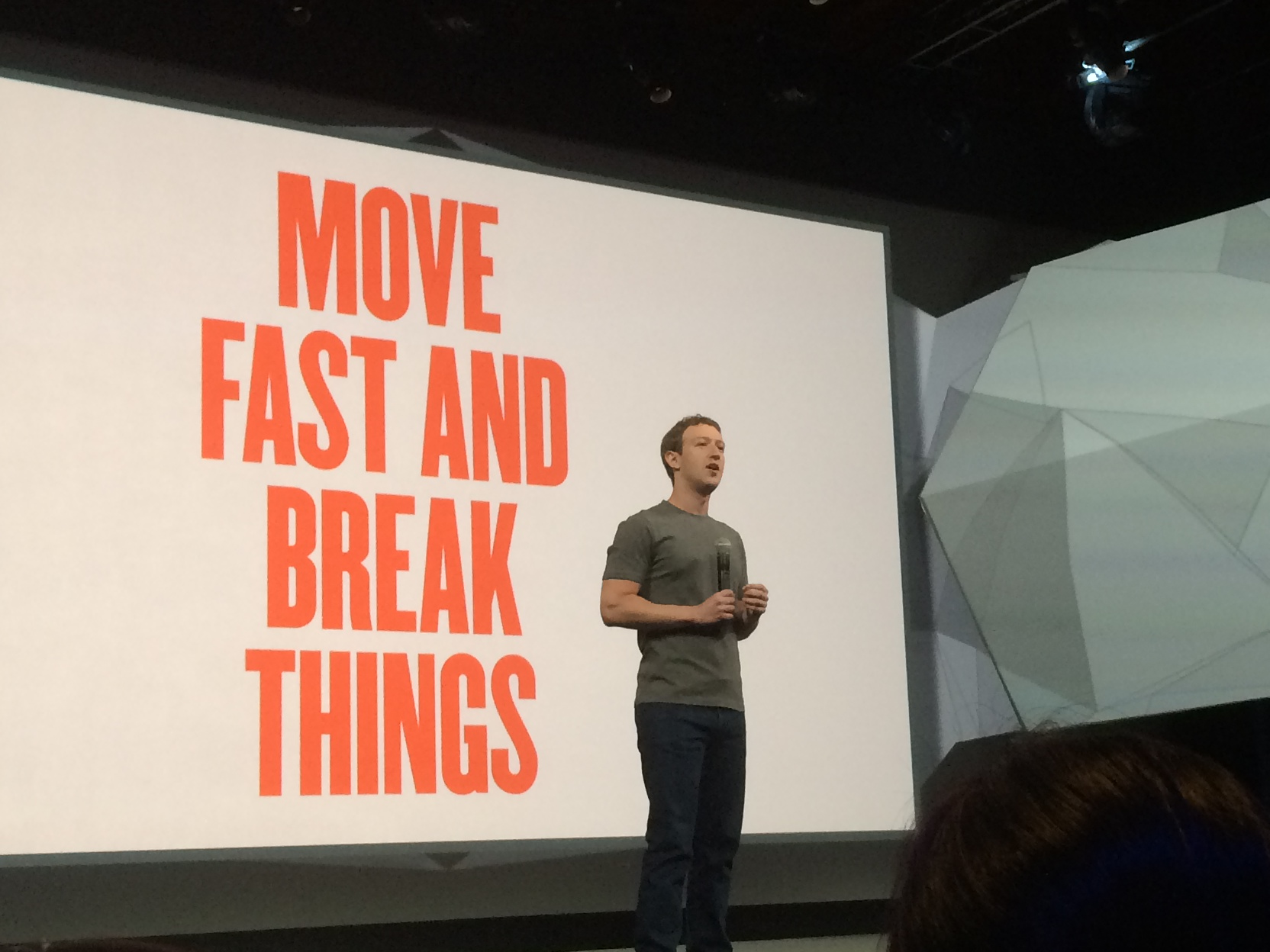
Early, hacker-geared motto: Move Fast and Break Things...

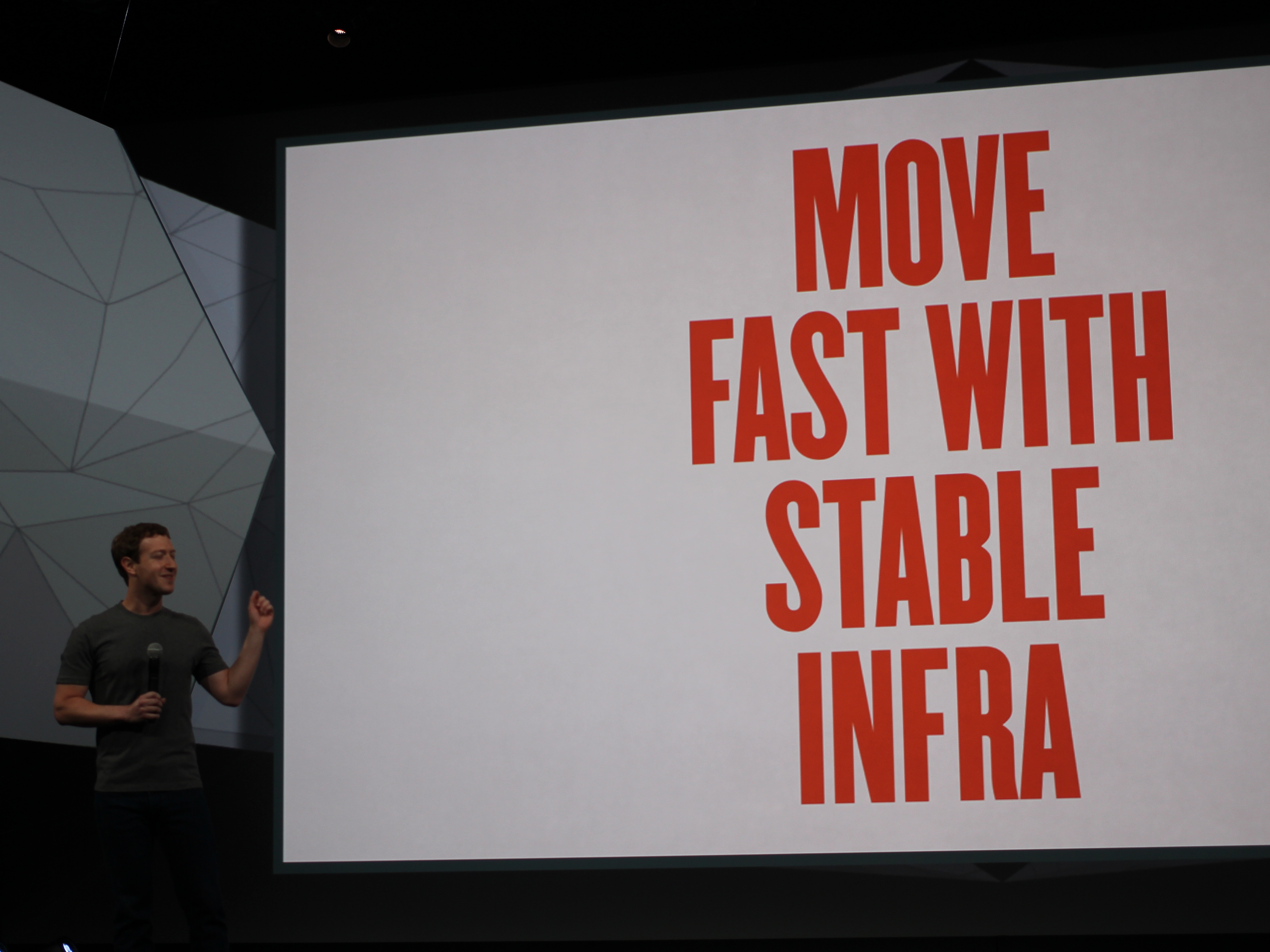
...to new motto: Move Fast with Stable Infra

F8 2014 was announced on March 8, 2014, by Facebook representative Ilya Sukhar that the F8 event would return on April 30.

The conference was focused on Facebook's strategy to become a 'cross-platform platform'.

Here is a list of the main topics:

- Audience Network
- Autofill With Facebook
- Anonymous Login
- Removing The Ability To Pull Friends' Data
- Granular Mobile Privacy Permissions
- 2-Year Core API Stability Guarantee
- Graph API 2.0
- FbStart
- Mobile Like Button
- Send to Mobile
- Message Dialog
- AppLinks
- Visualization APIs For Media
- Pricing changes
- Analytics and Offline Storage
- Internet.org Innovation Lab
- DisplayNode

== 2015 ==
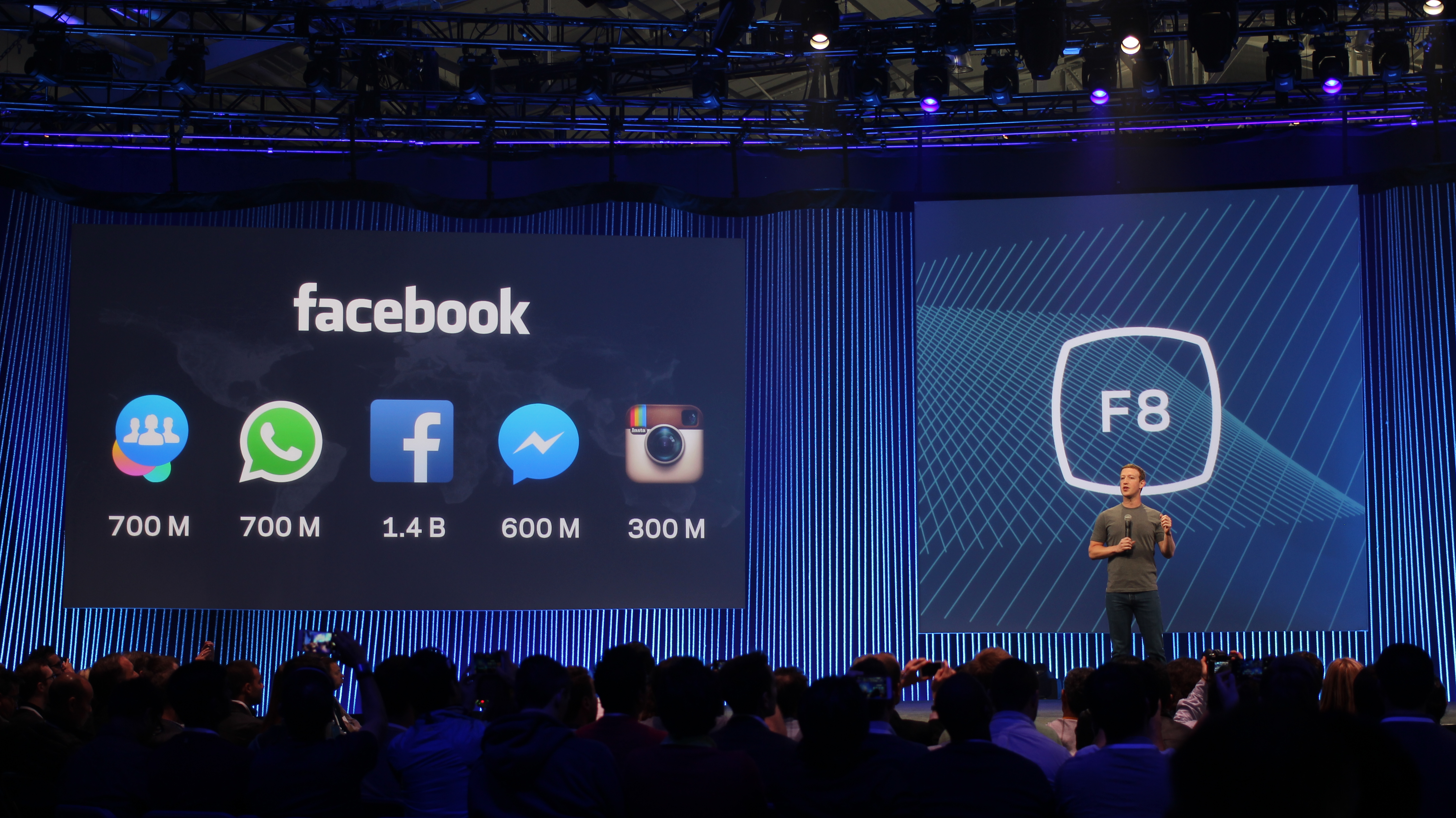
Users numbers updated for Facebook, Instagram, WhatsApp, Messenger, and Groups at F8 2015

The 2015 F8 conference was held on March 25, 2015, at the Fort Mason Center.

== 2016 ==
The 2016 F8 conference was held on April 12 and 13, 2016.

Announcements: Facebook Analytics adds push and in app notifications feature

== 2017 ==
The 2017 F8 conference was held on April 18 and 19, 2017, at the San Jose Convention Center in San Jose, California. Announcements included:

- Integrating the camera more into Facebook and Messenger, including more 360° features
- New augmented reality platform, challenging Snapchat
- Facebook Messenger: chat extensions including Spotify, Apple Music, and Aeromexico - which are called up by the user but do not chat in groups; improved discovery, further integration of M (virtual assistant)
- Virtual reality hangout app for Oculus Rift
- Deep learning framework Caffe2
- New 360° surround cameras
- Helicopters that provide internet via fiber optic cable
- Building 8 project aiming to allow people to type straight from their brain and hear through their skin

== 2018 ==
The 2018 F8 conference was held on the first two days of May 2018 at the McEnery Convention Center in San Jose, California. At the conference, Facebook announced the creation of their own online dating service. Shares in the dating business Match Group fell by 22% after the announcement. Announcements included:

- Facebook's mission being to "defy distance"
- Hugo Barra opened up his keynote talk mentioning Itaipu VR, produced by a Brazilian developer, Imersys.

== 2019 ==
The 2019 F8 conference was held at the end of April 2019 and the beginning of May 2019 at the McEnery Convention Center in San Jose, California. During the keynote, Mark Zuckerberg announced: "The future is private."

== 2020 ==
The 2020 F8 conference was held on April 25, 2020, as a virtual event due to the COVID-19 pandemic.

== 2021 ==
The 2021 F8 conference, AKA F8 Refresh, was held on June 2–3, 2021 as another virtual event.

== From 2022 ==
The 2022 F8 conference was canceled on April 6 in favor of Conversations, which was held on May 19 as a virtual event, focused on Meta Platforms' virtual reality "Metaverse" initiative.

The second iteration of Conversations was held 2023 in Mumbai, India.

The 2024 Conversations was held in São Paulo, Brazil, and focused on WhatsApp for Business.
