= Dragon Knights =

Japanese manga series

- Cover of volume 1 of the manga series Dragon Knights, published by Tokyopop

ドラゴン騎士団 (Doragon Kishi-dan)
- Genre: Adventure, Fantasy
- Manga
- Written by: Mineko Ohkami
- Published by: Shinshokan
- English publisher: AUS: Madman Entertainment; NA: Tokyopop
- Magazine: Wings
- Original run: 1990 – 2007
- Volumes: 26

Dragon Knights (ドラゴン騎士団, Doragon Kishi-dan; lit. 'Dragon Knight-Group') is a manga series drawn by Mineko Ohkami and published in the monthly Japanese magazine Wings. The manga was licensed in the United States by Tokyopop. The Tokyopop translation is imported to Australia by Madman Entertainment.

The sequel Heavenly Black and Evil White: Dragon Knights 2 follows 500 years after the original story and it is currently ongoing since 2014.

== Characters ==
=== Dragon Knights ===
Rath Illuser
The Dragon Knight of Fire. One of his favorite hobbies is killing demons, and will go out of his way to seek them out. He uses the Fire Dragon sword, and later the Light Dragon Sword, as his weapon. He also boasts Ice and Fire magic and a strange ability to create temporary copies of himself and absorb others' powers, along with special ties to the Light Dragon. It is now known that he wasn't the true Dragon Knight of Fire. Rath harbors a great amount of self-hate, frequently projecting this hatred onto others. In volume 19, he also nearly commits suicide by Thatz's Earth Dragon Sword. It takes a special person and a lot of effort to break through his many masks. He is also the only heir to the Dragon Lord. He is somehow related to the Demon Lord and believes that he shouldn't be living. Cesia and Rune are those that Rath acts naturally around. When he and Cesia travel together to look for a way to revive Crewger, Rath's demon dog, he begins to develop feelings for Cesia. He would do anything to save her from the many demons that are after her.
Rath used to be an evil spirit that had possessed the dead body of the Dragon dog, Illuser. Ace used his blood to turn it into one of the Dragon Tribe. After going to Nadil's castle to rescue Lii with Rune and Thatz, Rath is captured and Cesia releases all the souls that were held inside of Rath, most notably Gil and Bierrez, and Rath disappears. It is unknown whether or not Rath is dead at this point, and the story seems to indicate that Cesia will bring him back again at some later point.

When Cesia finally revives Rath once more, he goes back to Nadil's castle where Nadil reveals that Rath is the Demon King. This finally explains Karl's inexplicable loyalty to Rath and Rath's ability to continually return to life in different bodies. Rath uses Rakeita, the magical gun, with the help of the Dragon lord and Dragon empress' dragon eyes. In the end, Rath and Cesia become the Dragon Lord and Queen. In the sequel Heavenly Black and Evil White, he and Cesia have three children; plays the important role as well
Rune
The Dragon Knight of Water, an elfin prince. He gave up his elfin powers when he became a dragon knight, and spent much time trying to recover them. He is incredibly focused, and seems to hold the current mission above all else in his priorities. He uses the Water Dragon sword as his weapon, although he can also harness the Power of Varawoo (a demon fish) and the purifying elfin power of Virtue. Although none of his friends tend to remember, Rune is also in love with and married to the elfin princess, Tintlet. He also resembles a girl, as noted by Rath and Thatz. He becomes the next White Dragon Officer in the end.

Thatz
(or in the original Japanese version, That's) The Dragon Knight of Earth, a human. He was originally a thief before he awoke the Earth Dragon while trying to steal its seal from the Dragon palace. He still has a weakness for treasure and food. He uses the Earth Dragon sword as his weapon and, unlike the other two Knights, has no extra powers. In one of his battles against the Fire Demon Fedelta, he lost his left arm. Thatz, while coming off lighthearted, lazy, and even immature at times, cares deeply for Rath and Rune and tries hard to keep them both from harm—both external and self-inflicted. He becomes the next Blue Dragon Officer in the end.

=== Leading ladies ===
Cesia
A part-Yokai whom the Dragon Knights accidentally "rescued" from a witch. She can control wind magic and amplifies the powers of others who are near her. Her power amplification is one of the most sought after skills by both the Dragon Tribe and the Demon armies, and she has found herself to be of surprising worth. Cesia uses the Wind Staff both as a weapon and an object of healing—Although she has yet to unlock all of its secrets. She is one of the few who can get through to Rath and the person he feels the most comfortable around, as they share many aspects in their pasts. Cesia promises Rath that she would be the one to save him as she cares deeply for Rath.In volume 25 she eventually saves Rath and in doing so Rath and Cesia share a "Hello" kiss as Rath calls it. Cesia is a psychologically strong character, although she is also fighting her own inner demons which come not only in the more traditional forms of self-doubt and fear, but her Yokai side as well. She is very susceptible to curses. In the end, she becomes the new Dragon Queen.
Kitchel
A human thief like Thatz, she used to be his rival when they were both scraping a living on the streets. She stole all of Thatz's money and food when she got a job working for Lord Lykouleon, actually forcing Thatz to sneak into the castle and eventually become a Dragon Knight. She is currently enlisted as a treasure hunter for the Dragon Lord. Very upbeat and cheerful, Kitchel prides herself on both her ability to always look on the bright side and for still being the best thief around. She managed to find the Three Treasures.

Tintlet
The elfin princess and wife of Rune, Tintlet holds a surprising amount of power. Appearing at first glance to be no more than a delicate addition to the cast, her elfin powers are quite strong. Very adept at healing and purifying magic, Tintlet can also "kick butt" when riled. She has the ability to change her form into that of a young human-looking girl and so be able to better traverse the countryside without giving away her true identity. In addition, Tintlet is able to split her body and soul, an ability that has already proven useful multiple times. A deeply loving and understanding character, Tintlet, although remaining largely unseen until the (after a brief appearance in the sixth and thirteenth) fifteenth book, has quickly shown her worth and ability to handle all thrown at her. She is caring of others, especially for the Elfin race.

=== Dragon Lord and consort ===
Lord Lykouleon
The Dragon Lord, and previous Light Dragon Knight. He is a powerful fighter and an empathetic caretaker of the people, but is constantly being kept in the castle by his underlings. He feels responsible for Rath's troubles and hurt by Rath's inability to see eye-to-eye with him. His blood is poisonous to most people, being described like an "overdose of light medicine". He uses the Imperial Dragon Sword as his weapon, although Rath currently has this in his possession. Lykouleon takes all under his wing, welcoming humans, yokai, and elves alike into the Dragon castle. Except for Rath, his blood brother, he is the last of the royal line. By the end of the series, he dies and his soul helps Rath level the magic gun at Nadil. It is believed that he was the sacrifice Nadil was talking about, in order for Rath to retain his dragon powers as he shot Nadil.
Lady Raseleane
The consort to the Dragon Lord, Lady Raseleane is Lykouleon's beloved wife. Greatly popular among the Dragon Tribe, she is a nurturing mother to all within the walls. Lady Raseleane was captured by Lord Nadil when the demons invaded Draqueen for the first time, prompting the start of the poor (to say the least) diplomatic relations between Kainaldia and Draqueen. She was eventually rescued by Lord Lykouleon, but not before Nadil had removed her Dragon Eyes (greatly stunting her ability to foretell the future and use magic) and rendered her unable to bear the Dragon Lord an heir. Nadil tries to kidnap her after he is revived and Rath dies. Lykouleon saves her. After the Dragon Lord dies, she secludes herself and Cenozurna in a mountain mansion. She also tells Rath, the new Dragon Lord, that he and Lykouleon are one. In the sequel, she has a son named, Naatsu, one of the main protagonists.

=== Dragon officers ===
Alfeegi
The White Dragon Officer and Secretary, Alfeegi takes upon himself much of the responsibility for the every day affairs in the palace. He often scolds Ruwalk, Kaistern, Lykouleon and the three Knights for not finishing their work on time or giving extra money to Kaistern on his trips and such. As well as the castle finances, Alfeegi is in charge of their fortunetellers, placing Cesia under his care. Alfeegi has fantastic intuition and a keen mind, and although it seems like he enjoys yelling, he cares for all the Dragons very much. He was killed by Rath (who was possessed by Nadil at the time) in book 11. He returns in the latest book with the death faery, though unseen by any of the inhabitance of the Dragon Castle. It is assumed that he is either a ghost or a death faery now. He also visits Draqueen in the end, before Lykouleon dies, with Reema and Duuma. At that time, he instructs Saabel - whose soul was separated from his body and Alfeegi was talking to Saabel's soul - to find the Diamond Clover, a powerful dragon/monster that can defeat Yuusurgi. He is married to Reema, the death fairy.
Ruwalk
The Yellow Dragon Officer, Ruwalk acts as the Dragon Lord whenever Lykouleon cannot. He is childish and mischievous, but fights hard to protect the Dragon Tribe. Ruwalk has a tendency to give extra money to Kaistern for his frequent trips and help Lord Lykouleon slip out of the castle unnoticed. Always one to stand up for those trying to slide around the various castle formalities, he tends to get in trouble with Alfeegi quite often. He is Lykouleon's childhood friend and most of the time calls him by his given name without the title of "Lord": Ruwalk is Lykouleon's closest confidant and one of the few who are close enough to him to give him blunt advice or help. Ruwalk was also the one who chose to keep "Illuser" ["Eryusa" in Japanese] as Rath's last name. He and Cenozurna are paired up at the end.

Kaistern
The Blue Dragon Officer, Kaistern travels around the world as a diplomat with other countries on the continent of Dusis. He is the closest to Rath and the Dragon/Demon dog Crewger, taking Crewger along on several of his trips. He has spent the last several years searching for the mystical Wind Dragon in a desperate effort to save Rath, whom he cares deeply for, acting as a joint mentor-father-therapist for the Knight of Fire. Kaistern would (and, indeed, does) lay everything on the line for Rath, and although he is the only one who Rath tells everything to, he never truly is let in by the Knight, no matter how hard he has tried to be accepted. After being poisoned by demon water, he gives up his lifeforce to help resurrect Rath. (He died in book 12, after being poisoned in an earlier book.)
Tetheus
The Black Dragon Officer and in charge of security and of overseeing the Dragon Fighters and Knights, Tetheus does a commendable job to protect the Dragon Castle from harm. Brother to Shydeman and Shyrendora, meaning that he is a demon, he was rescued by Lykouleon and vowed to serve him. Dark, mysterious and incredibly strong, not much is known about his past or, in reality, his present. Tetheus isn't as harsh as he sometimes comes off, however, and while he can be very strict, is also protective to a fault, loyal, and with the uncanny ability to see far more than he reveals. He was able to kill his brother, Shydamen, and become a full dragon. He also, as he was fighting off Shydamen, reinforced Saabel's soul's instructions to find Diamond Clover. He and Kitchel are paired up in the end.

=== Historian ===
Cernozura
In charge of the castle maids and other lower staff, Cernozura has recently taken up the post of castle historian as well. Renowned for her culinary skills, Cernozura is a favorite of the younger members of the castle and a close friend and lady-in-waiting to Lady Raseleane. Often seen nursing the hurts (both major and minor) of the Dragon Clan, Cernozura is dutiful and friendly, and also a self-admitted romantic. She finds hope in reading into peoples' interactions and uncovering the latent feelings below.

=== Nadil's army ===
Nadil
The Demon Lord, arch-enemy of Lord Lykouleon. He was decapitated, but his armies still scour the land. Long ago, he worked with the Dragon Lord but betrayed him to lead his demonic forces. He was the true Dragon Knight of Wind, but consumed the Wind Dragon to gain power and further his own means. Ruthless and cruel, Nadil desires Cesia's power as well in order to strengthen his weakened, but by no means minute, forces. He harbors secret ties to Rath Illuser and is capable of possessing his body on occasion and wreaking havoc through him. While his exact plans are largely unknown to all by himself, Nadil's motives are clear: control of all three lands of Kainaldia, Dusis, and Arinas.
Shydeman and Shyrendora
Shyrendora is the younger twin sister of Shydeman. They share a single joined soul, making it so that if one of them dies, the other will as well. She was separated from her older siblings, Shydeman and Tetheus, when they were separated in a great war between the Dragon Lord and Demon Lord. She followed Shydeman when he chose to side with Nadil in order to gain new powers and to save each other from death. She has a hot temper, is easily agitated, and thinks of people as objects. Shyrendora is devoted to Nadil and is extremely distressed whenever his life is in danger. She is fairly amused by Sabel, and she finds pleasure in agitating him as well as the other lesser demons. Shydeman is the older twin brother of Shyrendora. He nearly died in the battle between the Dragon Lord and Demon Lord. Believing that Tetheus had died and while he himself was rendered weak, Shydeman joined with Nadil to receive enough power to make up for his lacking past. His strength grew and his lust for power grew with it, making him as power-hungry as Nadil. Just like his sister, he likes to control people {i.e. Gil} and show others that he is not to be toyed with. Shydeman cares nothing for Tetheus, deciding that anyone who joins the Dragon Tribe must be an enemy. He is smart and calm through most situations, and is careful to think before taking action. He has, oddly enough, formed a relatively open bond with the Fire demon Fedelta, promoting him to work directly under him and carry out his specific commands.

Fedelta
Fedelta is a Fire yokai and Shydeman's loyal spy. He does anything Shydeman tells him to do without complaint. He likes to be alone, and he keeps to the shadows most of the time and lacks confidence in what others do, thinking that he must do a job himself to get the work done. Fedela only truly cares about Shydeman and is extremely jealous of anyone that likes him or who is liked by him. He greatly dislikes the amusement that Shydeman got from Gil and tends to mess with Saabel, who also annoys him because of his high rank. Lim Kaana double irritated him for being another of Shydeman's favorites and for also being female. Much of Fedelta's tactics are "hit and run", appearing at random to throw the metaphorical wrench into the spokes and severely set back his opponents. He is also Bierrez's Older Brother.
Saabel
Saabel's past is deeply connected with the Spirit Tribe. Somewhere along the line, Nadil captured and gave Saabel his powers, and Saabel lost his memory. Afterwards, he became a corpse-gathering demon under Nadil's army. He gathers corpses and uses them like puppets to do whatever he pleases. He protects Nadil's castle in a sea of souls stolen from those he kills. While Saabel is bored easily, he also has a happy attitude and a quick temper. He is able to create portals, a power that he hides from other Yokai but commonly uses to his own advantage. Saabel is amused by Rath and curious as to why a yokai would help the Dragon Tribe. He uses the gifts he received from Nadil: Garaba (Galaba), Meteaura (Meteora), and the Black Thunder Demon, to kill people to use as his puppets. Saabel has an aversion to the Spirit Tribe, and feels pain whenever a faerie is close due to a curse placed on him by Nadil.

Gil
Gil was once a human, but was transformed into a demon by Kharl. Later sold to Nadil's army, he was treated like a slave by Shydeman and Fedelta. Despite his hopeless situation, he was rescued by a rebel Yokai named Raamganas, who took care of him and treated him fairly and whom Gil eventually fell in love with. But the mind control placed on him by Shyrendora enabled Nadil's army to toy with him, turning him into a merciless demonic beast and, in doing so, to kill Raamganas. Gil has little recollection of the things he did, and he lacks the power to stop it. He later killed his brother Barl's wife, as well as his niece Fiji. While Gil is one of Lord Nadil's prized demons, he is also the rightful Dragon Knight of Fire. Later on Gil takes back his title as a Dragon Knight. (When he finally encounters Raamganas' spirit, it is revealed that Gil was tricked into thinking he had killed Raamganas when Shydeman and Shyrendora had actually been behind it.)
Raamganas (Laamgarnas or Laamu Ghanasu)
Raamganas was the demon who rescued Gil from Nadil's army and nursed him back to health. He risked his life to keep Gil safe and was eventually killed—by Shyrendora's mind control on Gil. Laamu Garnas loved Gil deeply, and his memory haunted Gil even after his "death" at Rath's hands.

Bierrez (Viaresu)
Bierrez (or Viaresu) is a youkai who is very loosely affiliated with Nadil's army. A rebel demon, Bierrez keeps his loyalties to himself and dislikes being told what to do, often masterminding his own schemes rather than following orders. Due to an encounter with the Dragon Lord's blood as a young youkai, Bierrez used to be the only youkai able to enter the Dragon castle. While pretending to retrieve Cesia for Nadil's army, Bierrez actually attacked the Dragon Castle single-handedly in order to rescue her (though she didn't know it and refused to leave). He has a very close attachment to Cesia, having known her for several years, always watching out for her from behind the scenes and protecting her from other youkai who want her powers. While he appears to simply be trying to better his own place in life, Bierrez actually puts a lot of effort into doing what he thinks is best for Cesia; ultimately, he asked Rath to kill him in order to protect her. At the time of his "death" in the fourth volume, Bierrez possessed the Red Dragon Gem and was the Red Dragon Officer candidate. When Rath "killed" him, he absorbed the Red Dragon Gem. When revived by Cesia in volume 21, Bierrez agreed to become the Red Dragon Officer. He now refers to himself as a Dragon rather than as a yokai. Also Fedelta's younger brother.
Lim Kaana (Rim Kaana)
Lim Kaana (or Rim Kaana), a young female demon, was created along with her sister Leelu Reel (or Riru Riru) by Shydeman. One of her first major tasks was to steal back the Power of Varawoo from Rune... A task that failed miserably. Currently containing some of Tintlet's memories, Lim has been converted from the yokai mission and now works for the Dragon Tribe, trying her best to help them with her mix of demon magic and newfound faerie powers. Lim Kaana is quickly falling in love with Rune, but Rune himself seems to remain oblivious...

Roobal (Lobal)
Roobal (or Lobal) is one of Bierrez's friends, who gave up his arm so that Bierrez could use it. This character somehow survived Illuser's attack way back at Nadil's castle. He used to work for Nadil but he rebelled and now seems to be allied with the Dragons. He finally reveals his face and name at the 22nd volume.

=== Lord Kharl and Garfakcy ===
Kharl the Alchemist
A mysterious yokai who manipulates parts of the demon army from behind the scenes. He is able to create demons from captured faeries using his alchemy (An alchemist in this world is one who "creates souls", not one who tries to create gold.). He can transform other species as well into demons using demon seeds, which infect the body and change it into an alternate demonic form. He uses two "birds", which are sometimes referred to as his "wings", to aid him in this process. Left Bird creates minds, while Right Bird creates bodies. Left Bird was killed by Rath, halting Kharl's construction of intelligent demons, but has a connection to the small demon named Zoma. Kharl also is the writer of the "Demon Bible", a "how-to" guide on creating demons out of your own force. He also has several clones floating around, and a Demon Dog named Sinistora which he crafted to look suspiciously like the dead Snow Crewger and Ice Illuser. Very interested in anything unusual, Kharl is fascinated with strange plants, food, demons, and humans. Strangely enough, Kharl has taken in a human boy named Garfakcy and prolonged his life, keeping him as a maid-cook-gardener-spy-assassin-experiment. He is also a slob and tends to forget things and make messes. His role is that of a mad scientist. Kharl also harbors a strong craving for Rath: he wants to steal him back from the Dragon Tribe, but is finding himself strangely unable to do so, and not because he lacks the power needed. It is later revealed that Kharl was a friend/adviser of the Demon King of Arinas.
Garfakcy
A human boy taken in by Lord Kharl, Garfakcy has repeatedly voiced wishes to be turned into a demon, a desire Kharl simply laughs off. While unable to use magic of his own, Garfakcy casts spells using magical ash Kharl has created. He hates to feel weak or vulnerable, and doesn't let this side of himself show, preferring to come off as competent, even ruthless and vindictive. While seeming to be constantly irritated at the older yokai for his (many) annoying habits (forgetting things and making messes among them), Garfakcy is highly loyal to him and hates to see him threatened or hurt... Or to see him channeling his attention towards someone else.

These two are also very friendly to each other, like they are a real family. Dragon Knights volume 18 has a few bonus side stories based on these two's daily life, and it is quite funny. Two of these stories are a "cooking show" with Kharl and Garfakcy in which Kharl fails to make edible food and creates demons instead. In the sequel, he plays the important role.

=== Others ===
Zoma
A demon Cesia took under her wing when she first escaped the witch, he is very protective of her, and she cares for him deeply. He was the only one who stayed with her during her time captive by Nadil's army and the witch, and accompanied her to the Dragon Castle, even though he is a demon. He doesn't have much confidence in his abilities as he spent most of his short life unable to walk and without any skills other than the odd talent of being able to travel through mirrors. Zoma has ties to both Rath and Nohiro, and holds an inner power far greater than he can imagine or comprehend. It is now known that Zoma is Lord Kharl's left bird and he is restored to his true shape when Rath, Rune, and Thatz go to Nadil's palace to rescue Cesia.
Nohiro
A strange human, Nohiro has healing powers that far surpass that of any known faerie or elf. He has no recollections of his past apart from a vague memory of the Spirit Tribe. This has set off his quest to find out about the disappearance of the faeries and to save them from total destruction (and, of course, to wed a pretty elfin girl). He is also mysteriously connected to Rath and, therefore, to Zoma, although, when asked, Rath denied ever hearing of him. Very kindhearted, Nohiro is just learning how to use his powers and is currently traveling the land and working odd jobs in an attempt to earn money for his voyage. He also seems rather fond of Rune.
Miyabi, Shian, and Hanakusuku
Miyabi, Shian, and Hanakusuku are three Water Lights or faeries who teamed up with Nohiro on his search for more of the Spirit Tribe. Tight friends, they spend much of their time arguing with each other and vying for "Lord Nohiro's" attention and praise. Of the three, only Miyabi currently survives, the other two falling in Nohiro's defense as they fled from Lord Kharl's castle.
Ringleys
Ringleys, another Water Light, was rescued from a demon by Thatz and Kitchel and accompanied Kitchel on her quest for the Three Treasures. Lacking many powers, Ringleys comes along for moral support... And to be randomly thrust by Kitchel into situations against his will.
Reema
Reema is a death fairy. She helps noble souls into the Afterlife. She behaves childishly and playfully at times. But when it suits her she seems to have the mind of an adult and displays omniscient tendencies, doing her best to warn the Dragon clan of impending disasters though apparently these preordained events must happen. She has some feelings for Alfeegi; she helped him and the Dragon King in a demon town, and as he was dying he kissed her.
Duuma
Reema's companion and/or watcher, he takes their duties very seriously and tries to protect her. He appears to share the same foreknowledge of events.

=== Heavenly Black and Evil White (2014-present) ===
Natasu
The main protagonist of this series. He is a son of former Dragon Lord (Lykouleon) and former Dragon Queen (Raselene) who looks like Lykouleon and considers as a "stray member" in Dragon clan. He is very curious and adventurous; likes to travel around the world. He was one of the mysterious characters that often appeared in the original story along with Rio and Silk.
Rio/Figeas Illuser
A mysterious boy who owns a shop who befriends with Natasu and Silk. He was one of the mysterious characters that often appeared in the original story along with Natasu and Silk. In author's earlier draft his name was originally Ringas. It reveals, he is a son of the current Dragon Lord (Rath) and Dragon Queen (Cesia). Also, an older fraternal twin brother of Ceren, who is also known as Heaven Star Princess.
Silk
A fairy who accompanies with Natasu. Also, she appeared in the original story where she turned into demon due to Kharl meddling and died. Later, she was reborn by Nohiro's power.
Heaven Star Princess/Ceren
A mysterious girl whose real name is not revealed. She gives Cesia the Wind Staff. She knows things that are about to happen and gives the characters valuable information. Although there isn't much information about her, it's known that she has a greater role later in the story. In the sequel, her real name is Ceren, a newly bride of King of Arinas, daughter of the current Dragon Lord (Rath), Dragon Queen (Cesia) and Rio's younger fraternal twin sister.
Grinfish
The Heaven Star Princess's bodyguard. Like the princess, he is also a mysterious character with very few appearances. Not much is said about him either. In Heavenly Black and Evil White, Grinfish plays the important role in the sequel along with Heaven Star Princess.

== Manga ==
Dragon Knights was changed to being made in an unflopped format by Tokyopop in May 2002.

Dragon Knights ended in May 2007 with 26 tankouban volumes.

Following the sequel series called Heavenly Black and Evil White: Dragon Knights 2 Shukufuku no Kuro to Hametsu no Shiro: Doragon Kishidan II' (祝福の黒と破滅の白:ドラゴン騎士団 II) was released in 2014 and it is currently ongoing.

== Reception ==
According to Diamond Comic Distributors in December 2001, the third volume of Dragon Knights was the 243rd top selling comic.
