= FanimeCon =

Anime convention in San Jose, California

Coordinates: 37°19′43″N 121°53′20″W

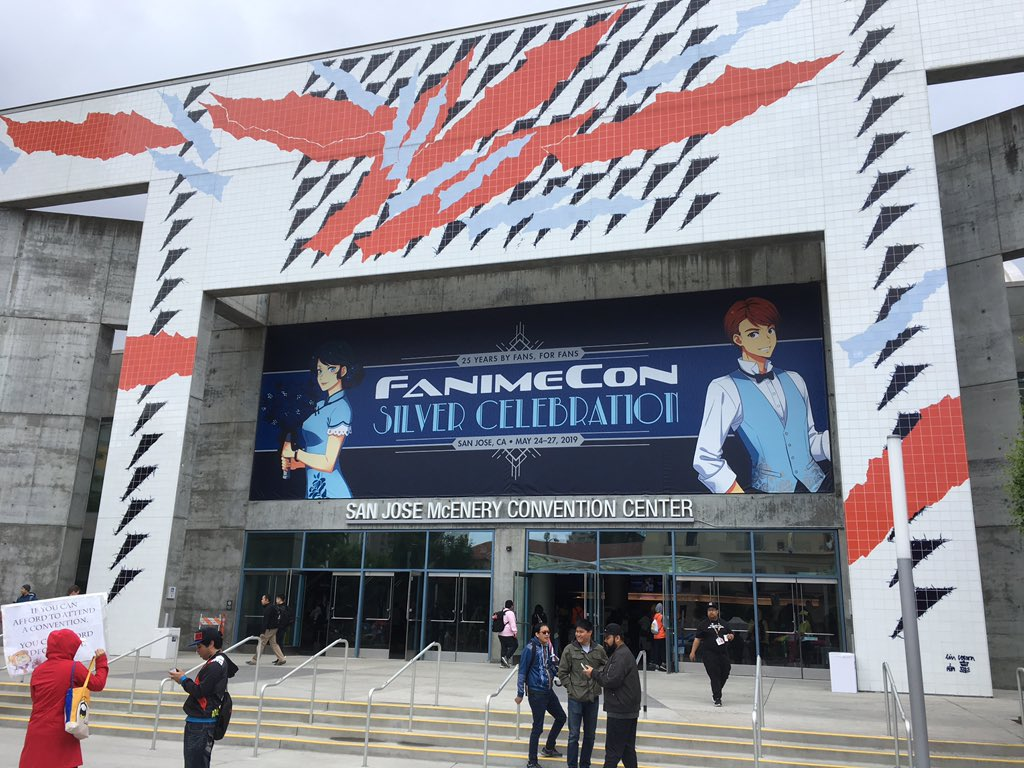
- 2019 entrance
- Status: Active
- Genre: Anime, Japanese popular culture
- Venue: San Jose McEnery Convention Center
- Location: San Jose, California
- Country: United States
- Inaugurated: June 14, 1994; 32 years ago
- Attendance: 28,000 (est.) in 2024
- Organizer: Foundation for Anime and Niche Subcultures
- Website: www.fanime.com

FanimeCon is an annual four-day anime convention held during May at the San Jose McEnery Convention Center in San Jose, California, over Memorial Day weekend.

== Programming ==
The convention typically offers an AMV contest, artist's alley, contests, cosplay chess, dances, dealer's room, fashion shows, formal ball, game room (arcade, console, PC, and tabletop), karaoke, maid cafe, masquerade, panels, screenings, a swap meet, tournaments, and workshops. The convention offers 24-hour programming, including gaming and video.

FanimeCon held an art auction for the charity Habitat for Humanity in 2004. Charities that FanimeCon supported in 2011 included the American Red Cross of Silicon Valley, APA Family Support Services of San Francisco, Cancer Support Community, and Japanese Red Cross Society.

== History ==
FanimeCon was first held in 1994 at California State University, Hayward, being run by several anime clubs. Foothill College would also host the convention until moving to the Wyndham Hotel in San Jose for 1999. From 2000 to 2003 the Santa Clara Convention Center hosted FanimeCon. In 2004, FanimeCon moved to the San Jose McEnery Convention Center. That year, the convention brought US$5 million to the local economy, growing to an estimated US$8.7 million in 2013, and US$10.5 million in 2014.

Problems with the convention in 2009 included Christian protests and over purchasing of artist alley tables, with the protesters also returning in 2010. In 2011, Saturday saw three hour registration waits, problems with the convention not using a printed schedule, outside religious protesters, and the Marriott fire alarm being pulled on Monday morning. Registration was affected in 2012 by a power outage. FanimeCon's 20th anniversary in 2014 was marked by San Jose having Fanime Day on May 23, 2014. The masquerade in 2015 suffered from technical issues. FanimeCon's masquerade for 2016 was scheduled to run for five hours. FanimeCon 2020 was canceled due to the COVID-19 pandemic. FanimeCon was changed to a virtual event for 2021.

The convention in February 2024 had significant numbers of staff quit due to accusations of improper treatment. An unofficial event outside of the convention called "Park Con" went viral online in 2026 due to the sale of "feet juice."

=== Event history ===
Dates	Location	Atten.	Guests
June 19, 1994	California State University, Hayward; Hayward, California	200	
February 25, 1995	California State University, Hayward; Hayward, California	350	Carl Gustav Horn and Frederik L. Schodt.
February 14, 1996	Foothill College; Los Altos Hills, California	775	Greg Espinoza, Allen Hastings, Carl Gustav Horn, Frederik L. Schodt, Toren Smith, and Toshifumi Yoshida.
March 8, 1997	Foothill College; Los Altos Hills, California	1,200	Allen Hastings, Carl Gustav Horn, Frederik L. Schodt, Toren Smith, and Hiroyuki Yamaga.
February 14–15, 1998	Foothill College; Los Altos Hills, California	1,700	Steve Bennett, Allen Hastings, Carl Gustav Horn, Kuni Kimura, Scott McNeil, Frederik L. Schodt, and Hiroyuki Yamaga.
March 19–21, 1999	Wyndham Hotel; San Jose, California	2,000	Steve Bennett, Allen Hastings, Mari Iijima, Gilles Poitras, and Hiroyuki Yamaga.
February 24–27, 2000	Santa Clara Convention Center; Santa Clara, California	2,300	Steve Bennett, Allen Hastings, Mari Iijima, Fred Patten, Gilles Poitras, Stan Sakai, and Hiroyuki Yamaga.
March 30 – April 1, 2001	Santa Clara Convention Center; Santa Clara, California	3,500	Steve Bennett, Tiffany Grant, Allen Hastings, Mari Iijima, Taliesin Jaffe, Jonathan Osborne, Fred Patten, Stan Sakai, Frederik L. Schodt, and Hiroyuki Yamaga.
April 26–28, 2002	Santa Clara Convention Center; Santa Clara, California	4,600	Takami Akai, Steve Bennett, Tiffany Grant, Carl Gustav Horn, Mari Iijima, Jonathan Osborne, Gilles Poitras, and Hiroyuki Yamaga.
June 20–22, 2003	Santa Clara Convention Center; Santa Clara, California	5,400	13-37, B! Machine, Laura Bailey, Steve Bennett, Blood, Akitaroh Daichi, Rebecca Forstadt, Allen Hastings, Sato Hiroki, Maria Kawamura, Tsurumaki Kazuya, Matt K. Miller, DJ MPU, Jonathan Osborne, Gilles Poitras, Kristine Sa, Yoshiyuki Sadamoto Secret Secret, Stephanie Sheh, Kari Wahlgren, Hiroyuki Yamaga, Reiko Yasuhara, and Takeda Yasuhiro.
May 28–31, 2004	San Jose McEnery Convention Center; San Jose, California	6,122	The Beautiful Losers, Blood, Camino, Duel Jewel, Fred Gallagher, Allen Hastings, Akemi Hayashi, You Higuri, Hiroaki Inoue, Jonathan Osborne, Gilles Poitras, Frederik L. Schodt, Nami Tamaki, J. Shanon Weaver, and Hiroyuki Yamaga.
May 27–30, 2005	San Jose McEnery Convention Center; San Jose, California	10,438	Steve Bennett, Kumiko Kato, Ric Meyers, Jonathan Osborne, Gilles Poitras, Ramen and Rice, Hiroyuki Yamaga, Maria Yamamoto, and ZZ.
May 26–29, 2006	San Jose McEnery Convention Center; San Jose, California	10,000	Akai SKY, Goofy Style, Kamijo, Ryoichi Koga, Miami, Takahiro Mizushima, Mothercoat, Ric Meyers, Jonathan Osborne, Gilles Poitras, Poplar, Rooster Teeth Productions, Asami Sanada, Swinging Popsicle, Kazuhiro Takamura, Up Hold, USA Musume, and Hiroyuki Yamaga.
May 25–28, 2007	San Jose McEnery Convention Center; San Jose, California	12,000	Crack 6, Greg Dean, Ryan Gavigan, Carl Gustav Horn, Mari Iijima, Sekihiko Inui, Karma Shenjing, Reuben Langdon, Derek Liu, Mechanical Panda, Ric Meyers, Jonathan Osborne, Gilles Poitras, Asami Sanada, Hiroyuki Yamaga, and ZZ.
May 23–26, 2008	San Jose McEnery Convention Center; San Jose, California	14,926	An Cafe, Ryan Gavigan, Carl Gustav Horn, Hidenobu Kiuchi, Reuben Langdon, Ric Meyers, Maika Netsu, Jonathan Osborne, Gilles Poitras, Dan Southworth, and Richard Waugh.
May 22–25, 2009	San Jose McEnery Convention Center; San Jose, California	15,000	Keith Burgess, Ryan Gavigan, Carl Gustav Horn, Ken Lally, Reuben Langdon, Patricia Ja Lee, Ric Meyers, Haruko Momoi, Jonathan Osborne, Gilles Poitras, and Hiroyuki Yamaga.
May 28–31, 2010	San Jose McEnery Convention Center; San Jose, California	16,000	Karen Dyer, Flow, Ryan Gavigan, Carl Gustav Horn, Daisuke Ishiwatari, Reuben Langdon, LM.C, Ric Meyers, Haruko Momoi, Toshimichi Mori, Jonathan Osborne, Gilles Poitras, Hiroyuki Yamaga, and Mamoru Yokota.
May 27–30, 2011	San Jose McEnery Convention Center; San Jose, California	20,880	Flow, Tohru Furuya, Gashicon, Ryusuke Hamamoto, Yoshiki Hayashi, Fumio Iida, Yuya Matsushita, Ric Meyers, Seiji Mizushima, Haruko Momoi, Gilles Poitras, Mamoru Yokota, and Takahiro Yoshimatsu.
May 25–28, 2012	San Jose McEnery Convention Center; San Jose, California	21,000	Mai Aizawa, Kia Asamiya, Igaguri Chiba, Shigeto Koyama, Ric Meyers, Gilles Poitras, David Vincent, Hiroyuki Yamaga, and Mamoru Yokota.
May 24–27, 2013	San Jose McEnery Convention Center; San Jose, California	25,542	7!!, Darrel Guilbeau, Tsuyoshi Nonaka, Takahiro Omori, Gilles Poitras, ROOKiEZ is PUNK'D, Yumi Sato, and Hiroyuki Yamaga.
May 23–26, 2014	San Jose McEnery Convention Center; San Jose, California		Takami Akai, Kira Buckland, Home Made Kazoku, Hiroyuki Kanbe, Noir, Gilles Poitras, Raj Ramayya, Chantal Strand, J. Michael Tatum, and Hiroyuki Yamaga.
May 22–25, 2015	San Jose McEnery Convention Center; San Jose, California		Back-On, Chalk Twins, Mel Hoppe, Marquis of Vaudeville, Ai Nonaka, Gilles Poitras, Cindy Robinson, Patrick Seitz, Christopher Corey Smith, Kazuhiro Soeta, and Hiroyuki Yamaga.
May 27–30, 2016	San Jose McEnery Convention Center; San Jose, California		Aicosu, Da-iCE, Masaya Matsukaze, Gilles Poitras, Daisuke Sakaguchi, Cristina Vee, Yoshihiro Watanabe, Lisle Wilkerson, and Sky Williams.
May 26–29, 2017	San Jose McEnery Convention Center; San Jose, California		Aicosu, Chris Cason, Hideo Ishikawa, Kanae Ito, Shigeto Koyama, Lauren Landa, Linda Le, Erica Mendez, Phoenix Ash, Doug Walker, X4, and Hiroyuki Yamaga.
May 25–28, 2018	San Jose McEnery Convention Center; San Jose, California	30,735	Aicosu, Chalk Twins, Caitlin Glass, Todd Haberkorn, Chikashi Kubota, Linda Le, nano, Ryotaro Okiayu, Gilles Poitras, and Satomi Sato.
May 24–27, 2019	San Jose McEnery Convention Center; San Jose, California	34,000	Aicosu, Nobutoshi Canna, D-Piddy, Aya Hirano, Toshihiro Kawamoto, Linda Le, Chris Patton, Phoenix Ash, Gilles Poitras, and Jad Saxton.
May 28–31, 2021	Online convention		
May 27–30, 2022	San Jose McEnery Convention Center; San Jose, California		Chad Hoku, Xanthe Huynh, Linda Le, Matthew "Maguma" Lewis, Keisuke Ueda, David Vincent, Aoi Yuki, and Alvin Zhou.
May 26–29, 2023	San Jose McEnery Convention Center; San Jose, California	27,000	Aicosu, Jirard Khalil, Hirokatsu Kihara, Linda Le, Kyle McCarley, Gilles Poitras, Jordana Robinson, and Yashafluff.
May 24–27, 2024	San Jose McEnery Convention Center; San Jose, California	28,000 (est.)	Kira Buckland, Hirokatsu Kihara, Linda Le, Matthew "Maguma" Lewis, Casey Mongillo, Gilles Poitras, Yuu Hayashi, and Survive Said the Prophet.
May 23–26, 2025	San Jose McEnery Convention Center; San Jose, California		Atsushi Abe, Dorothy Fahn, Tom Fahn, Jessie James Grelle, Linda Le, Gilles Poitras, and Tsubasa Yonaga.
May 22–25, 2026	San Jose McEnery Convention Center; San Jose, California	27,500	Khoi Dao, Zack Davisson, Linda Le, Matthew "Maguma" Lewis, Emi Lo, Hiroshi Nagahama, Ai Nonaka, Gilles Poitras, Yuriko Yamaguchi, ALI and Mint Fantôme.
