= Anime Mid-Atlantic =

Anime convention in Norfolk, Virginia

Coordinates: 36°50′43″N 76°17′27″W

- Status: Defunct
- Venue: Norfolk Waterside Marriott
- Location: Norfolk, Virginia
- Country: United States
- Inaugurated: 2001; 25 years ago
- Attendance: 4,416 in 2011

Anime Mid-Atlantic was an anime convention held in June (normally on Father's Day weekend) at the Norfolk Waterside Marriott in Norfolk, Virginia. The convention was previously held in Richmond, Virginia and Chesapeake, Virginia for several years.

== Programming ==
The convention typically offered an anime music-video contest, artist's alley, dance, dealer's room, hall costume contest, karaoke, masquerade, panels, video game tournaments, video rooms, and workshops.

== History ==
In 2001, Anime Mid-Atlantic became Richmond, Virginia's first anime convention and was held at the Holiday Inn Select Koger South Conference Center. The 2008 convention was scheduled to be held at the Hyatt Regency Crystal City in Washington, D.C., but due to a double-booking issue, the Hyatt canceled the conventions contract. The convention moved to the Holiday Inn Executive Center in Virginia Beach, Virginia. In 2010, the convention collected donations for the Make-A-Wish Foundation and held an event in remembrance of Carl Macek, who attended the convention in 2002 and was scheduled to attend the convention again before dying. The 2016 convention took place in the Chesapeake Conference Center, along with the Marriott Chesapeake and Wingate By Wyndham hotel. Due to the CEO's health issues, Anime Mid-Atlantic went on hiatus in 2019.

=== Event history ===
Dates	Location	Atten.	Guests
June 15–17, 2001	Holiday Inn Select Koger South Conference Center; Richmond, Virginia	657	Steve Bennett, Austell "DJ Asu" Callwood, Kara Dennison, Colleen Doran, Nickey Froberg, Mike Hayes, Steve Pearl, Jan Scott-Frazier, Doug Smith, and Brett Weaver.
June 14–16, 2002	Holiday Inn Select Koger South Conference Center; Richmond, Virginia	968	Steve Bennett, Austell "DJ Asu" Callwood, Kara Dennison, Nickey Froberg, Mike Hayes, Humouring the Fates, Carl Macek, Jan Scott-Frazier, Doug Smith, Terry Tymczyna, Jason Waltrip, and John Waltrip.
June 13–15, 2003	Sheraton Richmond West; Richmond, Virginia	1,150	Robert V. Aldrich, Greg Ayres, Austell "DJ Asu" Callwood, T. Campbell, Robert DeJesus, Kara Dennison, Greg Eatroff, Newton Ewell, Tiffany Grant, Humouring the Fates, Jan Scott-Frazier, Shawn the Touched, and Terry Tymczyna.
May 28–30, 2004	Holiday Inn Select Koger Center; Richmond, Virginia	1,729	Robert V. Aldrich, Greg Ayres, Steve Bennett, Austell "DJ Asu" Callwood, Robert DeJesus, Amy Howard-Wilson, Monica Rial, Doug Smith, and Terry Tymczyna.
June 17–19, 2005	Holiday Inn Select Koger Center; Richmond, Virginia	2,000	Robert V. Aldrich, Greg Ayres, Eirik Blackwolf, Keith Burgess, Austell "DJ Asu" Callwood, Robert DeJesus, Mark E. Rogers, and Doug Smith.
June 16–18, 2006	Greater Richmond Convent Center; Richmond, Virginia	3,017	Robert V. Aldrich, Yunmao Ayakawa, Greg Ayres, Steve Bennett, Eirik Blackwolf, Jonathan Brands, Keith Burgess, Austell "DJ Asu" Callwood, Ron Chiu, Michael Coleman, Jason Cumberledge, Emily DeJesus, Robert DeJesus, Michael Gluck, Mari Iijima, Yasuhiro Koshi, Kay Reynolds, Mark E. Rogers, Kristine Sa, Leo Saunders, Joe Silver, Doug Smith, Jen Starling, Renee Starling, Donnie Sturges, Danny Valentini, Jason Waltrip, John Waltrip, Koshi Yasuhiro, Steve Yun, and Tommy Yune.
June 15–17, 2007	Greater Richmond Convention Center; Richmond, Virginia	4,462	Robert V. Aldrich, Yunmao Ayakawa, Greg Ayres, Eirik Blackwolf, Johnny Yong Bosch, Austell "DJ Asu" Callwood, Ron Chiu, Robert DeJesus, Michael Gluck, Mike Hayes, Yasuhiro Koshi, Mark E. Rogers, Leo Saunders, Joe Silver, Doug Smith, Swinging Popsicle, Unicorn Table, and X-Strike Studios.
June 13–15, 2008	Holiday Inn Executive Center; Virginia Beach, Virginia	3,250	Robert V. Aldrich, Christopher Ayres, Greg Ayres, Eirik Blackwolf, Jonathan Brands, Ron Chiu, Emily DeJesus, Robert DeJesus, Mike Hayes, Chuck Huber, Chris "Kilika" Malone, Vic Mignogna, Leo Saunders, Joe Silver, Doug Smith, X-Strike Studios, and Steve Yun.
June 19–21, 2009	Hampton Roads Convention Center; Hampton, Virginia	3,596	Robert V. Aldrich, Robert Axelrod, Yunmao Ayakawa, Christopher Ayres, Eirik Blackwolf, Johnny Yong Bosch, Richard Epcar, Eyeshine, Mike Hayes, Chuck Huber, Dave Lister, Chris "Kilika" Malone, Doug Manring, Jamie McGonnigal, Miguel Antonio Nieves, Alison Rementer, Ellyn Stern, and X-Strike Studios.
June 11–13, 2010	Chesapeake Conference Center; Chesapeake, Virginia	4,059	Robert V. Aldrich, DJ Asu Rock, Eirik Blackwolf, Ron Chiu, The Clockwork Dolls, Mike Hayes, Dave Lister, Doug Manring, Jamie Marchi, Vic Mignogna, Misako Rocks!, Power Kix, Kay Reynolds, Joe Silver, Doug Smith, Jason Waltrip, John Waltrip, X-Strike Studios, Steve Yun, and Tommy Yune.
June 17–19, 2011	Chesapeake Conference Center; Chesapeake, Virginia	4,416	Robert V. Aldrich, DJ Asu Rock, Eirik Blackwolf, Chris Cason, Leah Clark, Charles Dunbar, Eien Strife, Todd Haberkorn, Mike Hayes, Amy Howard-Wilson, Dave Lister, Reni Mimura, Miguel Antonio Nieves, Alison Rementer, Substantial, The Villains 21, and X-Strike Studios.
June 15–17, 2012	Chesapeake Conference Center; Chesapeake, Virginia		Robert V. Aldrich, DJ Asu Rock, Eirik Blackwolf, Emanuel F. Camacho, Chris Cason, Daniel Coglan, Jillian Coglan, Charles Dunbar, Eien Strife, Mike Hayes, Amy Howard-Wilson, Danielle McRae, Miguel Antonio Nieves, Alison Rementer, Todd Rogers, Salia, Leo Saunders, Patrick Seitz, Spike Spencer, X-Strike Studios, and Tommy Yune.
June 14-16, 2013	Chesapeake Conference Center; Chesapeake, Virginia		Robert V. Aldrich, Chris Cason, Charles Dunbar, Eien Strife, Kyle Hebert, Chuck Huber, Danielle McRae, Vic Mignogna, Todd Rogers, Doug Smith, and Steve Yun.
June 13-15, 2014	Chesapeake Conference Center; Chesapeake, Virginia		Robert V. Aldrich, Chris Cason, Charles Dunbar, Eien Strife, Junko Fujiyama, Mike Hayes, Kyle Hebert, Amy Howard-Wilson, Kevin McKeever, Todd Rogers, Leo Saunders, Christopher Smith, J. Michael Tatum, Uncle Yo, and David G. Wilson III.
June 19-21, 2015	Chesapeake Conference Center; Chesapeake, Virginia		Robert V. Aldrich, Yunmao Ayakawa, Chris Cason, Charles Dunbar, Eien Strife, Amy Howard-Wilson, Lord Ramirez, Danielle McRae, Vic Mignogna, Reni Mimura, Genesis Moss, Jim O'Rear, Todd Rogers, Leo Saunders, Jad B. Saxton, and Tommy Yune.
June 17-19, 2016	Chesapeake Conference Center; Chesapeake, Virginia		Robert V. Aldrich, Chris Cason, Charles Dunbar, Megan Emerick, Mike Hayes, Lord Ramirez, Kevin McKeever, Reni Mimura, Jim O'Rear, Todd Rogers, Leo Saunders, Substantial, and David Vincent.
June 17-19, 2017	Norfolk Waterside Marriott; Norfolk, Virginia		Robert V. Aldrich, Eirik Blackwolf, Eien Strife, Greg Houser, Amy Howard-Wilson, Lord Ramirez, Vic Mignogna, Jim O'Rear, Aaron Roberts, Todd Rogers, Leo Saunders, and David G. Wilson III.
June 15-17, 2018	Norfolk Waterside Marriott; Norfolk, Virginia		Dino Andrade, Robert Axelrod, Eirik Blackwolf, Charles Dunbar, Edo Bushido, Mike Hayes, Greg Houser, Amy Howard-Wilson, Lord Ramirez, Aaron Roberts, Todd Rogers, Leo Saunders, Greg Wicker, and David G. Wilson III.

== AMA Cosplay Fest ==
AMA Cosplay Fest was a three-day anime convention held during December/January at the Marriott Chesapeake in Chesapeake, Virginia. The convention's programming includes cosplay competitions, cosplay chess, fashion shows, karaoke, masquerade cosplay, panel discussions, tabletop gaming, and workshops.

=== Event history ===
Dates	Location	Atten.	Guests
December 30, 2016 - January 1, 2017	Marriott Chesapeake; Chesapeake, Virginia		501st Legion, Yunmao Ayakawa, Lord Ramirez, The Mandalorian Mercs, Danielle McRae, and Reni Mimura.
