= Team San Jose =

Team San Jose (TSJ), also known as Visit San Jose, is a non-profit destination marketing organization and visitors bureau, created to promote tourism in San Jose, California. Team San Jose was created in 2003 in response to a request for proposal issued by the City of San Jose.

Team San Jose is an economic driver in Silicon Valley, evolving into a $20 million company with more than 300 employees.

== Properties managed ==
- San Jose Convention Center
- San Jose Civic
- California Theatre
- Montgomery Theater

== See also ==
- San Jose Redevelopment Agency
