= San Jose Convention Center =

Convention center in Downtown San Jose, California, United States

San Jose McEnery Convention Center
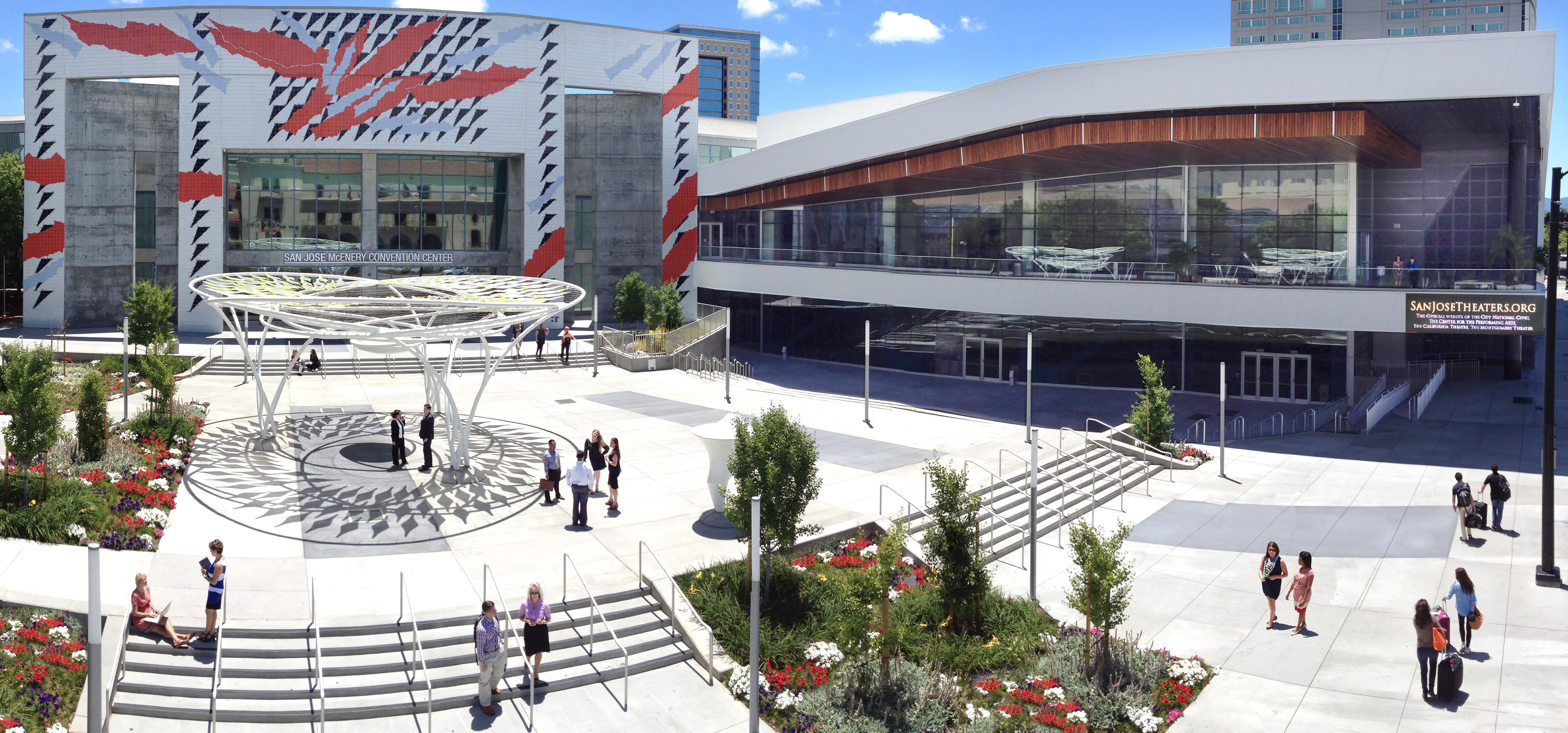
- North entrance on San Carlos Street
- Interactive map of San Jose McEnery Convention Center
- Former names: San Jose Convention Center (1989–1991)
- Location: San Jose, California
- Coordinates: 37°19′43″N 121°53′20″W
- Operator: Team San Jose
- Public transit: Convention Center

Construction
- Expanded: October 10, 2013
- Architects: Mitchell/Giurgola (original); Populous (expansion)

The San Jose McEnery Convention Center is a convention center in Downtown San Jose, California. The 550,000-square-foot (51,000 m^{2}) Main Hall is the largest convention center in Silicon Valley. It has hosted technology conferences such as Apple's Worldwide Developers Conference and Facebook F8, as well as fan conventions including FanimeCon and GalaxyCon.

The center opened in 1989, supplementing a convention hall at the San Jose Civic, later renamed Parkside Hall, which was demolished in 2019. It is named for Tom McEnery, a former mayor of San Jose. The South Hall, an 80,000-square-foot (7,400 m^{2}) tent-like structure, was added in 2005, and the Main Hall was renovated and expanded in 2013. The venue is managed by Team San Jose, which also operates several nearby event spaces.

== Facility ==
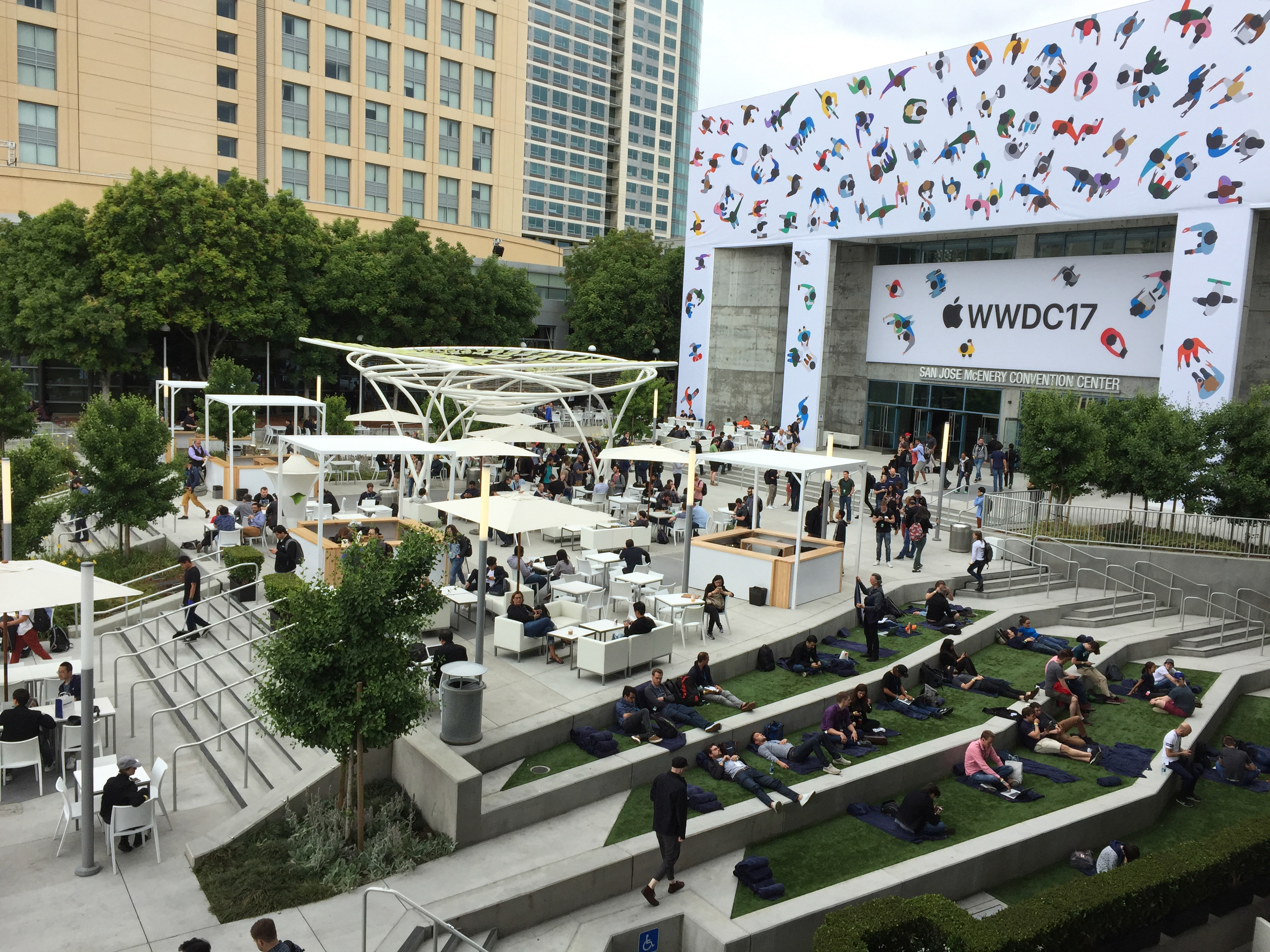
Apple Worldwide Developers Conference in 2017

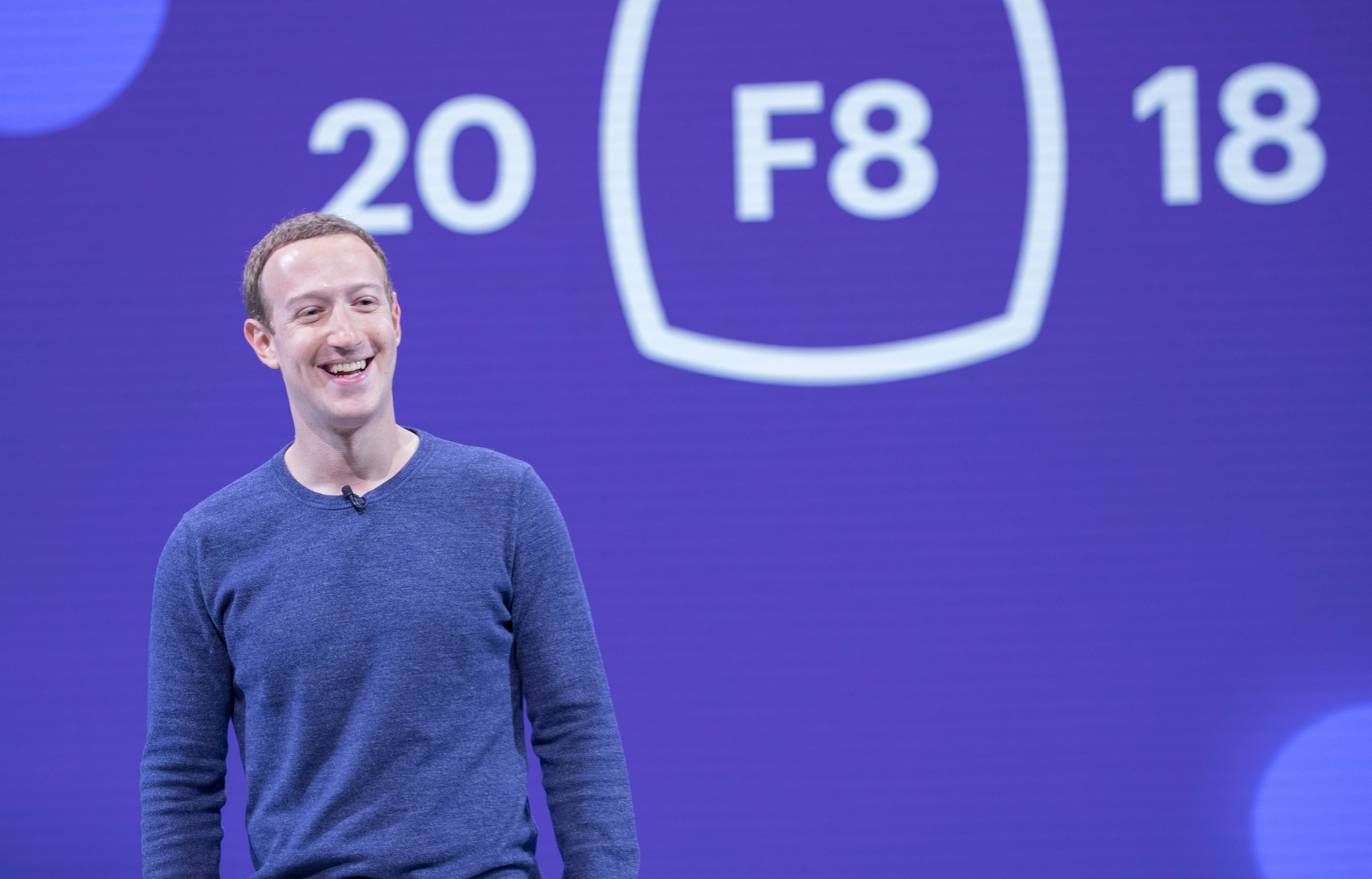
Facebook CEO Mark Zuckerberg speaking at Facebook F8 in 2018

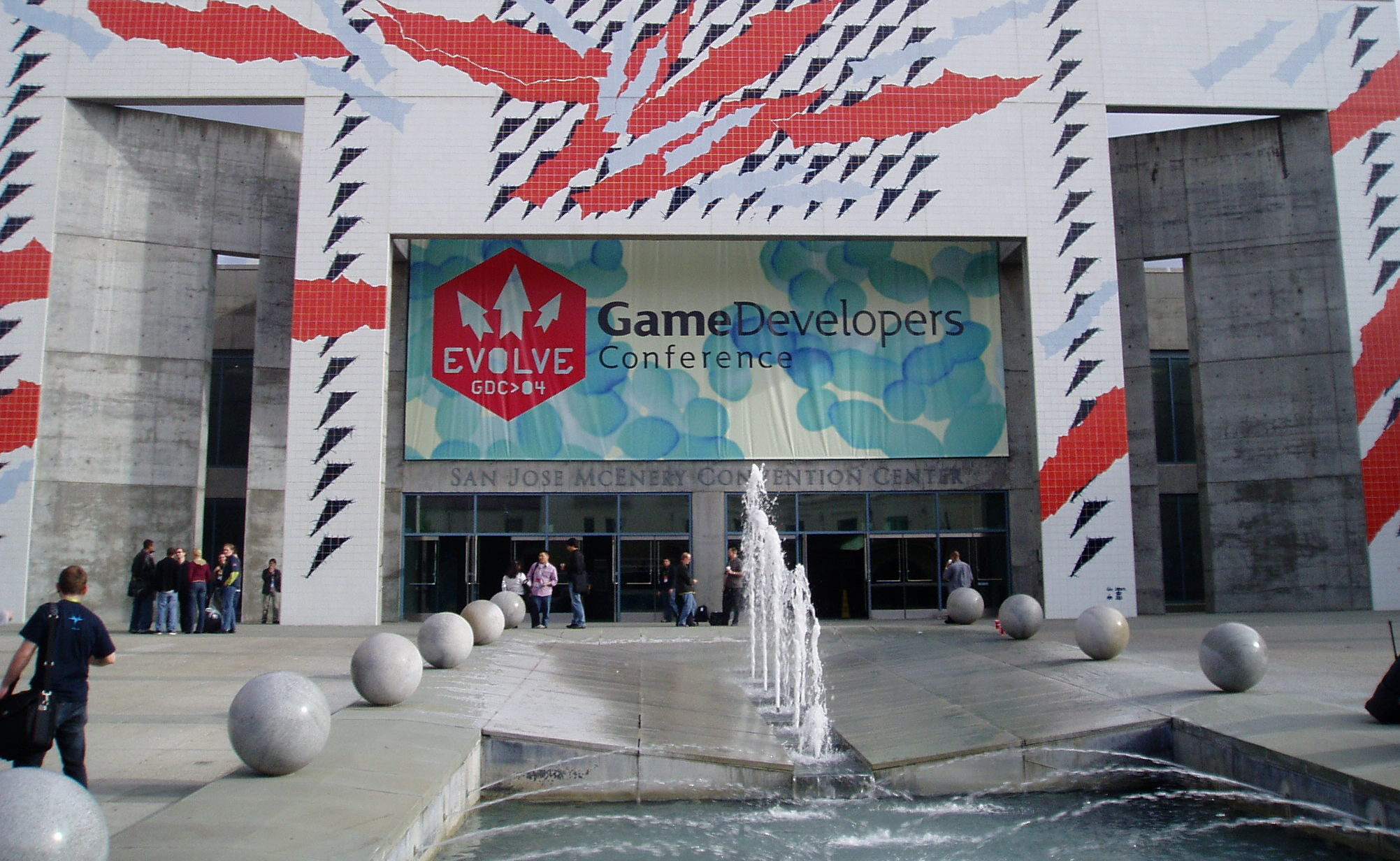
Game Developers Conference

The convention center covers a total of 367,526 sq ft (34,144.3 m^{2}), including 214,760 sq ft (19,952 m^{2}) of exhibit hall floor space, 43 meeting rooms, and two large ballrooms. There are entrances on West San Carlos Street, Almaden Boulevard, and South Market Street. The San Jose Hilton and Marriott hotels are both directly connected to the Main Hall. A two-story hallway connecting the three entrances is called the "Parkway" on the ground floor and the "Concourse" on the second floor.

A recessed main entrance along West San Carlos Street features two prominent art installations. A tile mural by Lin Utzon (1988) adorns a façade surrounding the entrance. The two-story-tall mural, resembling a flock of birds in flight, consists of over 8,000 red, white, and black porcelain tiles manufactured by Royal Copenhagen. An interactive sculpture, Idea Tree by South Korean architect Soo-in Yang, stands in the plaza fronting the entrance. In the lobby hangs a 1993 life-size bronze and steel sculpture, Winged Guardian by Stephen De Staebler.

The South Hall, a metal-framed fabric structure, adds another 80,000 square feet (7,400 m^{2}) of exhibit space, for a joint total of 245,000 square feet (22,800 m^{2}). It can accommodate 11,428 people, or 5,333 people with exhibits. It is surrounded by a public parking lot on a 191,668-square-foot (17,806.5 m^{2}) site. City leaders have called for the South Hall's demolition at various times since it was erected in 2005 as a temporary structure; nevertheless, the city considers it important for attracting large events to the convention center. The South Hall and surrounding parking lot are owned by the Successor Agency to the Redevelopment Agency of San Jose (SARA). The South Hall's maintenance costs $38,000 each year, while demolition is estimated to cost at least $1 million.

The convention center is located one block from the San Carlos Street exit of California State Route 87 and two blocks from the Almaden Boulevard exit of southbound Interstate 280. California State Route 82 also passed by the convention center on South Market Street until this portion of the route was relinquished to San Jose in 2013. The public Convention Center Parking Garage is connected to the convention center. Public surface parking lots are located across Almaden Boulevard to the west and across Viola Street surrounding the South Hall.

The convention center is accessible by public transportation. The Convention Center VTA light rail station is located directly in front of the convention center's main entrance on West San Carlos Street. The station is served by the Blue Line and Green Line. The station is two stops away from the intermodal San Jose Diridon station. The convention center is also served by VTA local and express bus routes, San Jose State University's free Downtown Area Shuttle (DASH), and a Bay Wheels bicycle sharing station across West San Carlos Street.

== History ==
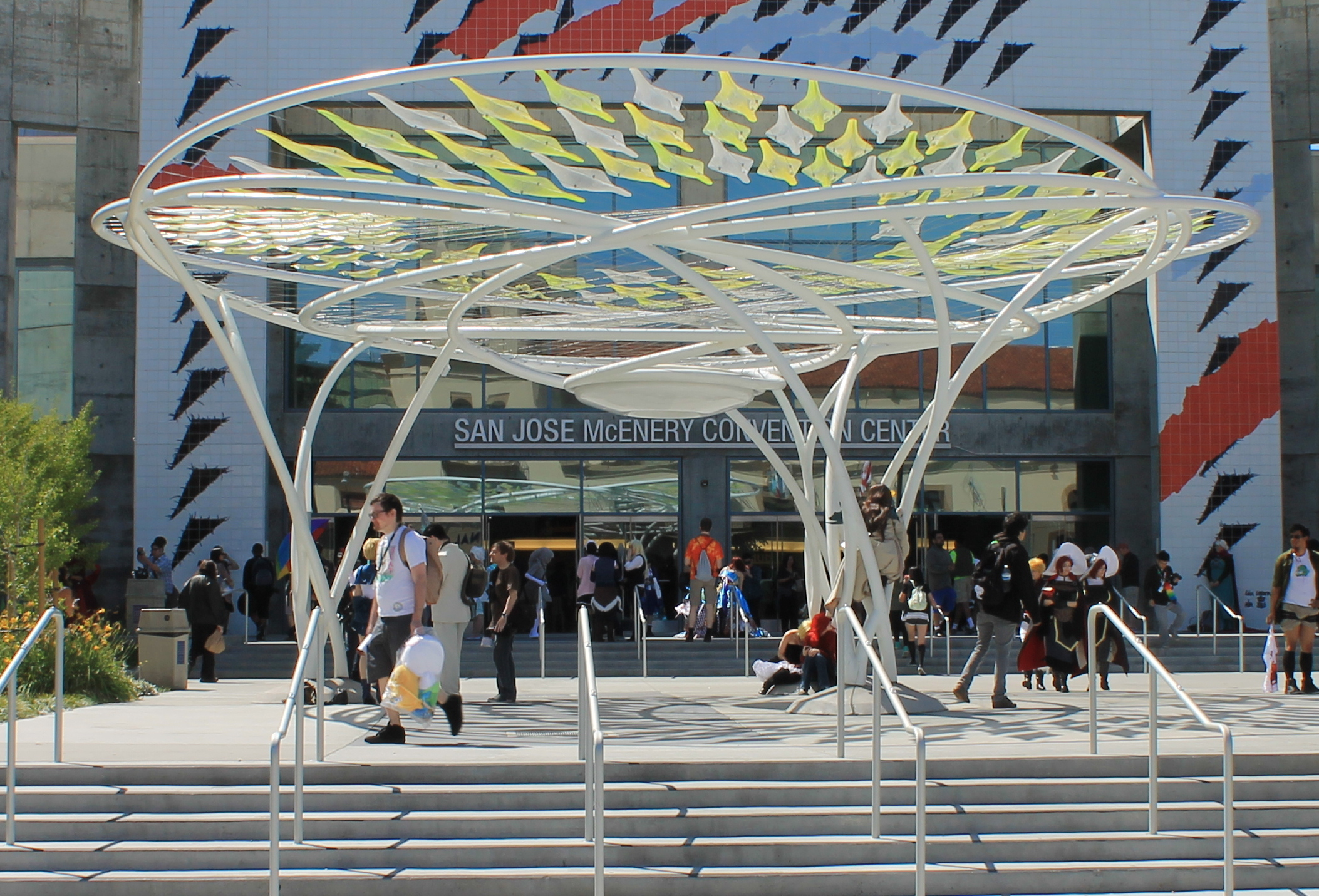
Idea Tree, an interactive sculpture by South Korean artist Soo-in Yang

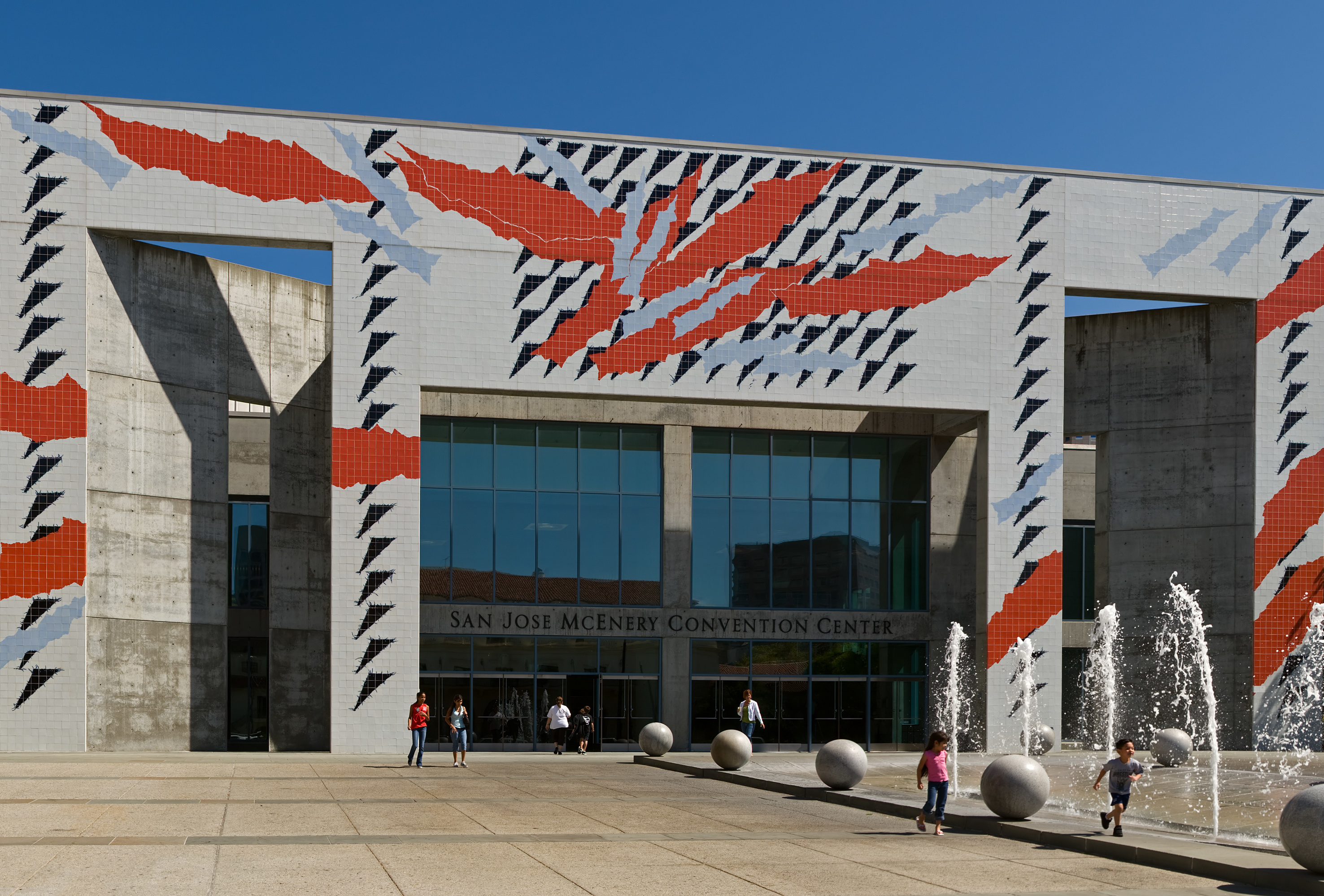
The façade on the north entrance on San Carlos Street features a tile mural by Danish artists Lin Utzon, consisting of over 8,000 porcelain tiles manufactured by Royal Copenhagen.

The first general-purpose event center in San Jose was the Santa Clara County Horticultural Society's Horticultural Hall, which operated for about 30 years from 1886 until the Santa Clara County Fairgrounds opened. Civic Auditorium served as the city's main events venue from its opening in 1933 as Municipal Auditorium.

In 1957, voters approved a bond measure for the construction of a modern convention center. Construction on the Jay McCabe Convention Hall began in December 1952, and the facility opened in 1964 with the Loyal Order of Moose national convention.

With the opening of the Anaheim Convention Center in 1967, city officials became dissatisfied with Civic Auditorium and McCabe Hall and sought a replacement. Based on a study by Stanford Research Institute in 1970, the city commissioned architect William Hedley and Hellmuth, Obata + Kassabaum to draw up plans for a "Community Plaza" superblock centered around a new convention hall. In October 1973, Mayor Norman Mineta approved $2.4 million for the new convention hall, which would be a wing of Civic Auditorium (now called San Jose Civic), along with an underground parking structure. However, by November 1974, the plans had been downsized to a mere 30,000 square feet (2,800 m^{2}) of exhibit space and an above-ground parking garage. The new San Jose Convention Center broke ground on November 18, 1975, and was dedicated by Mayor Janet Gray Hayes on September 22, 1977.

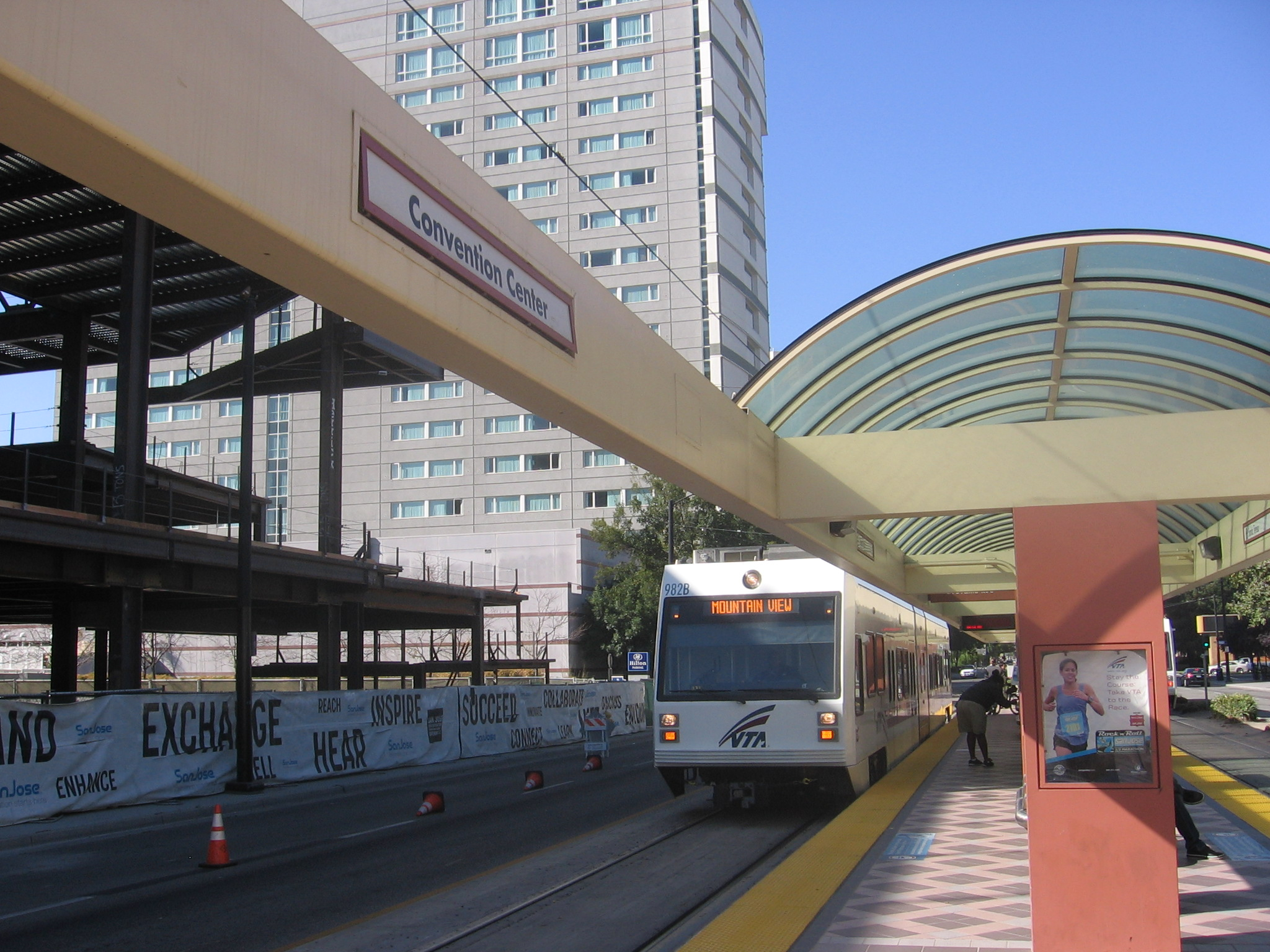
Convention Center station of the VTA light rail

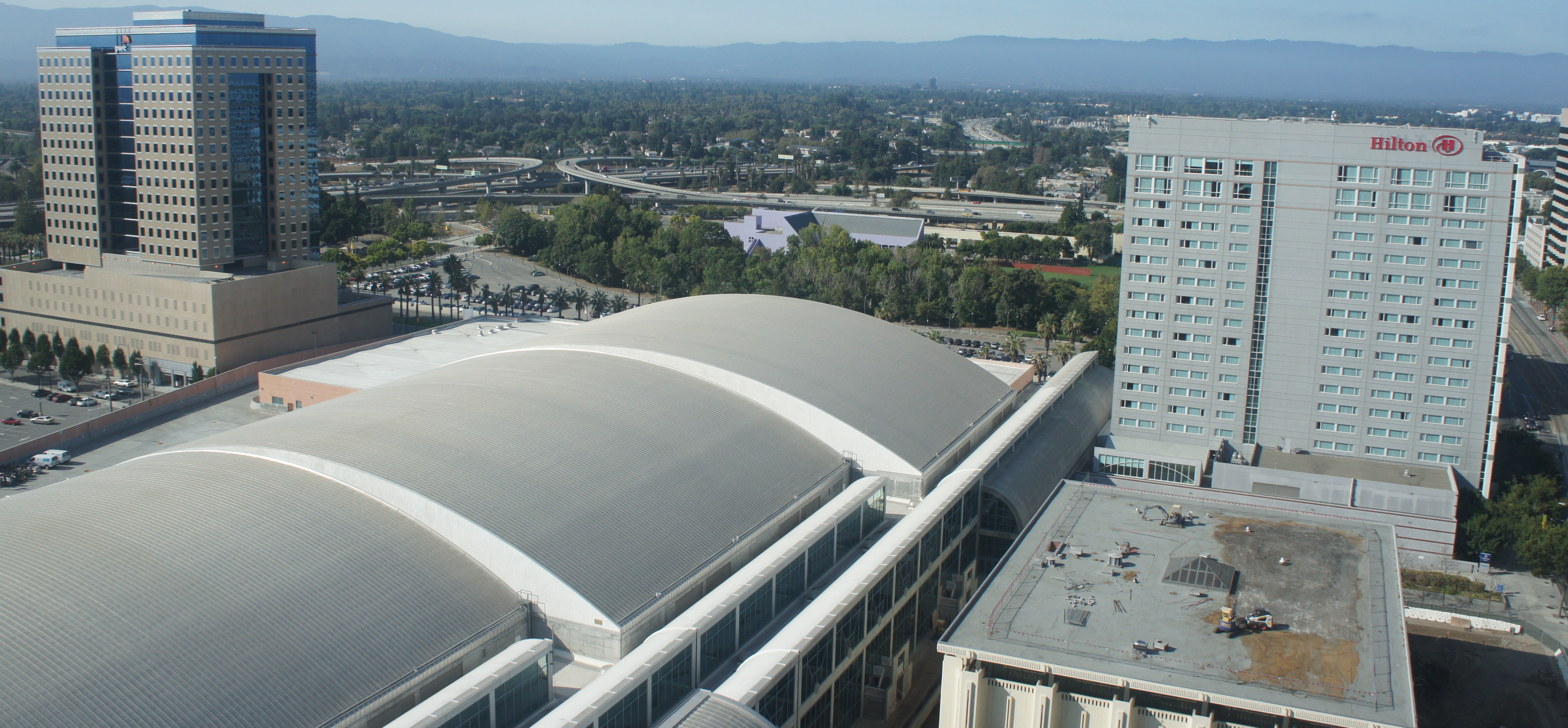
An aerial view towards the West Valley

The second and current San Jose Convention Center was approved by Mayor Tom McEnery in 1983 as part of an urban renewal project that displaced a low-income, Hispanic neighborhood. The 425,000-square-foot (39,500 m^{2}) convention center was designed by Mitchell/Giurgola Architects, Daniel Mann Johnson Mendenhall, and the Steinberg Group. Blount Construction was the general contractor. The new convention center cost $147 million (equivalent to $323 million in 2024) to build, of which the San Jose Redevelopment Agency contributed $143 million ($314 million). It opened in 1989. Meanwhile, the 1977 convention center was renamed Parkside Hall. "The Garage", now The Tech Interactive, moved into McCabe Hall in 1990. In 1991, the San Jose Convention Center was renamed the San Jose McEnery Convention Center in honor of the former mayor.

In its early years, the new convention center failed to meet attendance and revenue expectations. By 2002, many Silicon Valley businesses were choosing the much larger Moscone Center in San Francisco over the San Jose Convention Center due to the latter's limited space. A ballot measure to finance an expansion via a hotel tax failed to reach the required two-thirds majority to pass. In June 2005, Team San Jose built the South Hall, a $6.77 million, blue and white tent, adding 80,000 square feet (7,400 m^{2}) of exhibit space.

In 2009, local hotels agreed to a hotel tax increase to fund the convention center's renovation and expansion. On October 10, 2013, the convention center completed the $130 million project, which added 125,000 square feet (11,600 m^{2}) on the site of the former Martin Luther King Jr. Library. The San José Public Library relocated its main branch to the Dr. Martin Luther King Jr. Library on the San Jose State University campus.

In 2018, SARA put the South Hall site up for sale. The city purchased the plot for $47 million in order to facilitate plans to one day expand the convention center. During the COVID-19 pandemic, from April 2020 to July 2021, the South Hall served as an emergency homeless shelter. With an average capacity of 200 adults, it was the city's largest shelter.

== Events ==
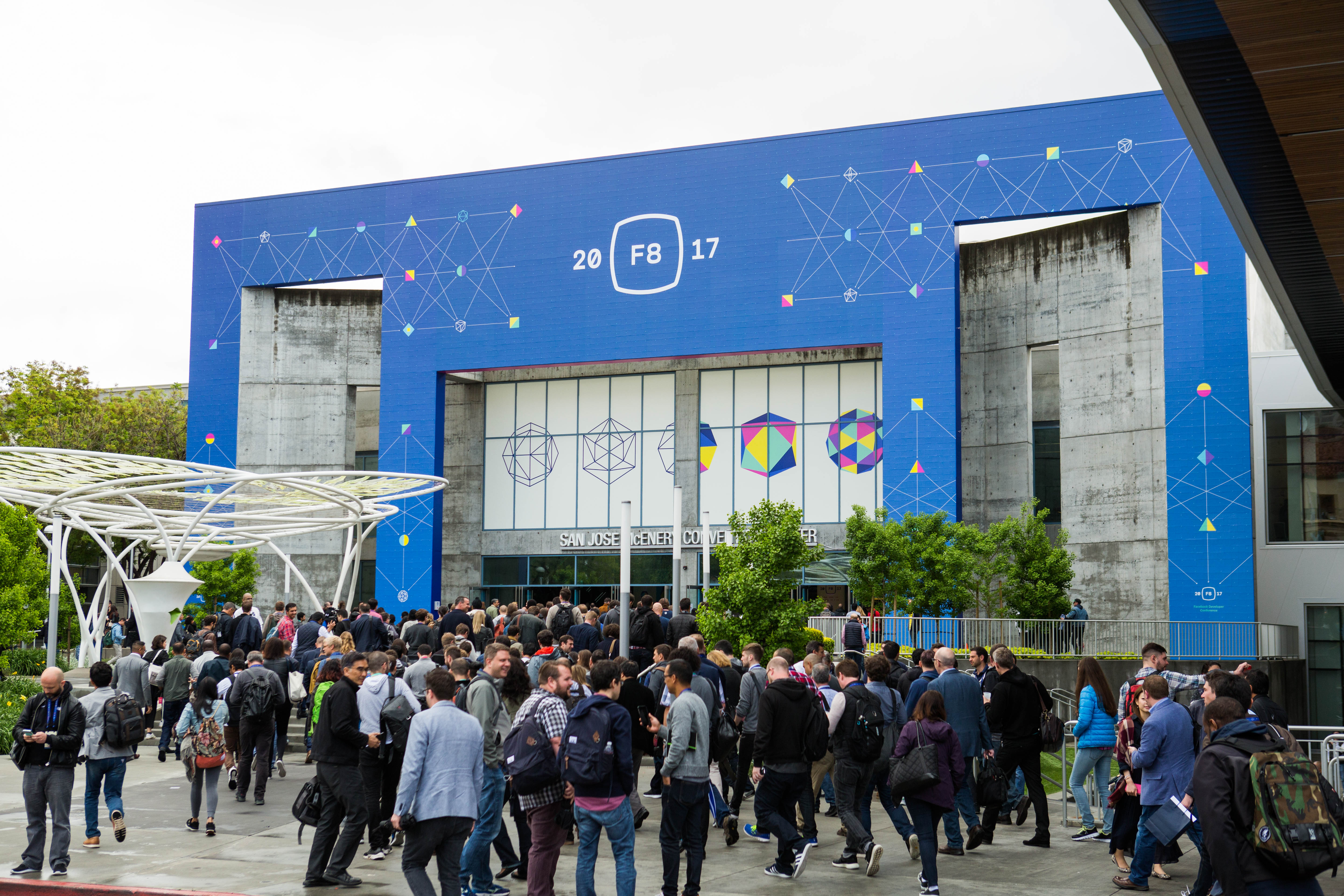
Facebook F8 2017

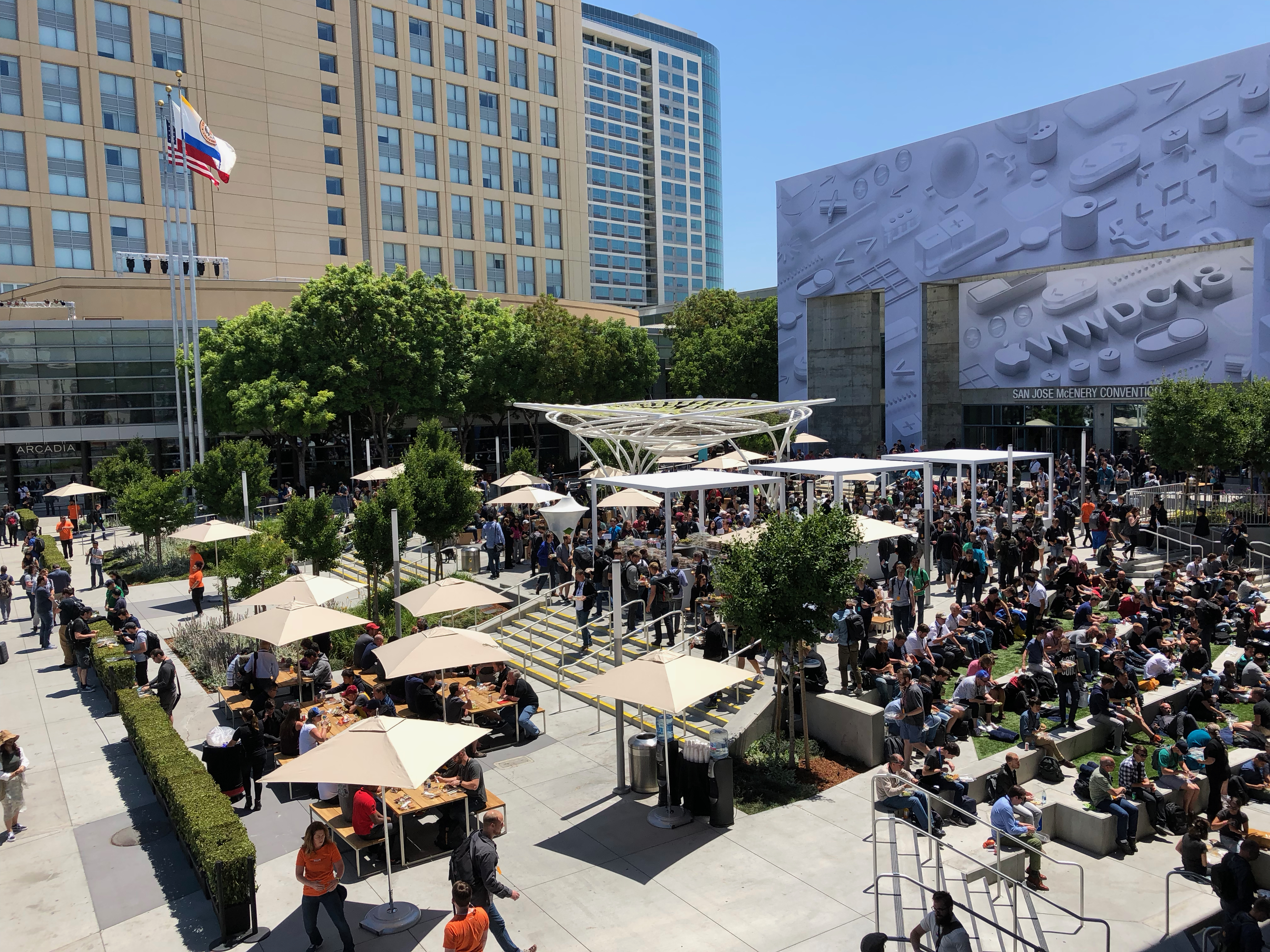
Apple Worldwide Developers Conference in 2018

As of 2017, the convention center hosted hundreds of events each year. The current annual event schedule includes:

- GalaxyCon (since 2024)
- FanimeCon (since 2004)
- Further Confusion
- Nvidia GTC (2009–2010, 2012–2019, since 2024)
- OffKai Expo (since 2025)
- Roblox Developers Conference (since 2024)

Other notable events at the convention center have included:

- Worldwide Developers Conference (1989–2002, 2017–2019)
- Windows Hardware Engineering Conference (1993, 1996)
- Silicon Valley Auto Show (1994–2020)
- ACM/IEEE Supercomputing Conference (1997)
- LinuxWorld Conference and Expo (1998)
- World Science Fiction Convention (2002, 2018)
- Game Developers Conference (2004, 2006)
- RoboNexus (2005)
- North American Bengali Conference (2009)
- Big Wow! ComicFest (2011–2015)
- Creative Convergence Silicon Valley (2013)
- WrestleMania Axxess for WWE's WrestleMania 31 (2015)
- GX3: Everyone Games (2015)
- SiliCon (2016–2022)
- Conference on Human Factors in Computing Systems (2016)
- A rally for Donald Trump's 2016 presidential campaign that prompted rioting
- Genesis 3, 4, 8, and 9 in 2016, 2017, 2022, and 2023 respectively; the final day of the tournament for 3, 4, and 8 occurred at City National Civic
- Facebook F8 (2017–2019)
- Crunchyroll Expo in August or September (2018, 2019, 2022)
- TwitchCon (2018)
- ARM DevSummit (2018–2019)
- Games Done Quick Express (2018)
- The NHL Fan Fair for the 2019 National Hockey League All-Star Game
- Samsung Developer Conference (2019)
- The Last of the Street Survivors Farewell Tour (2019)

== See also ==
- List of convention centers in the United States
- Santa Clara County Fairgrounds
- Santa Clara Convention Center
