= Karma Shenjing =

Japanese visual kei rock band

- Origin: Kansai, Japan
- Years active: 2002–present
- Members: Rairin; Ikuto; Shino; Sakika

Karma Shenjing (カーマ・シェンジン) is a visual kei rock group based in the Kansai area of Japan that formed in November 2002.

== History ==
In 2005, the band debuted overseas in the United States at Jrock Connection 2005 and returned the next year in 2006. They also performed at FanimeCon in 2007.

== Members ==
- Rairin (來鈴), Vocals, was born December 20 in Hyougo-ken.
- Ikuto (幾都), Guitar and Synthesizer, was born February 13 in Tottori-ken.
- Shino (祠乃), Guitar, was born February 14 in Okayama-ken.
- Sakika (咲華), Bass, was born August 22 in Yamagata-ken.

== Discography ==
- Rinne Jigokuhensouzu (Demo CD 2003-4-26)
- Kousousaisai Reiga (Demo CD 2004-2-13)
- Shikirakuyou Yumezuki (Demo CD 2005-8-28)
- Ruten Rinne (Album Japan: 2006-1-25, USA: 2006-11-25)
- The Seal of Reincarnation -USA Limited Version (Live DVD 2006-11-25)
