= RoboNexus =

RoboNexus was a robotics event in the United States held from 2004 to 2005. Over 10,000 attended RoboNexus in 2004.

RoboNexus showcased advances in robotics for both industry representatives and the general public. Notable exhibitors included the company iRobot, creators of Roomba, and NASA.

Robotics Trends also produces an annual RoboBusiness conference.

== Events ==
- 2005 - San Jose Convention Center, San Jose, California
