= Mineko Ohkami =

Japanese manga artist

- Born: August 2 Kotou, Nagasaki, Japan
- Occupation: Manga artist
- Website: Ohkami's official website

Mineko Ohkami (押上美猫, Ōkami Mineko; born August 2) is a Japanese manga artist, known for being the author of many shōnen and shōnen-ai series, including Dragon Knights and Lumen Lunae. Her Pen name derives from the fact that she likes wolves and cats (ohkami = wolf; neko = cat)

== Works ==
- Densetsu no Kokuou o Sagase!! (伝説の国王を探せ!!) (1990)
- Doragon Kishidan (ドラゴン騎士団) (1990, Shinshokan Publishing); English translation: Dragon Knights (2002, Tokyopop)
- Papa wa Warumono!? (パパは悪者!?) (1993)
- Asuka² (1994)
- Lumen Lunae (月華佳人 Lumen Lunae) (1995)
- Kurseong South: The Forest of Black Tea (2006)
- Dragon Kishidan Gaiden: One Day, Another Day (2007)
- Strawberry Palace (2008)
- Jintori-Gassen (陣取合戦) (2009)
- Shukufuku no Kuro to Hametsu no Shiro: Doragon Kishidan II' (祝福の黒と破滅の白:ドラゴン騎士団 II) (2014)
