= Swinging Popsicle =

Japanese band

Swinging Popsicle is a three-member indie pop/rock band from Japan.

== Members ==
- Mineko Fujishima (藤島 美音子, Fujishima Mineko) (Vocals)
- Osamu Shimada (嶋田 修, Shimada Osamu) (Guitar)
- Hironobu Hirata (平田 博信, Hirata Hironobu) (Bass)

== Information ==
In 1995, Hironobu Hirata, Mineko Fujishima, and Osamu Shimada met each other through a newspaper advertisement looking to start a band. The following year, they recorded and were able to participate on a Pony Canyon compilation album. They released their first indie album in 1997 and rose to number 2 on the HMV Shibuya charts.

Their song "Satetsu no tou," track 4 from "fennec!" is the character image song for Akiha Tohno, one of the characters in Tsukihime, a visual novel game that became an anime and manga series.

In summer 2006, Swinging Popsicle's new song "Kanashii Shirabe (Sad Melody)" appeared on "CRACKER: compilation for a bittersweet love story," a CD that came with a Korean manga "Cracker."

In May 2006, the band played their first show in the United States at the FanimeCon Musicfest in the Civic Auditorium in San Jose, California. They returned to America in June 2007 for concerts at Anime Mid-Atlantic in Richmond, Virginia and at the Knitting Factory in New York City.

In March 2008, the band played their first time in Monterrey, Nuevo León, México at the 32nd Convención de Juegos de Mesa y Comics.

== Discography ==
From their official website

=== Albums ===
- [1998.06.24] Swinging Popsicle
- [2000.01.26] Fennec!
- [2004.03.17] transit
- [2007.05.30] Go On
- [2009.09.02] Loud Cut
- [2015.12.10] flow

=== Mini-Albums ===
- [1997.03.10] Sunny Silent Park E.P.
- [2002.06.21] Rakuen Shugi Swinging Eden

=== Singles ===
- [1997.07.21] Joy of Living
- [1998.01.21] I Love Your Smile
- [1998.05.02] Parade
- [1998.10.31] Heaven
- [1999.06.02] Remember
- [1999.11.25] Satetsu no Tou
- [2001.03.14] Change E.P.
- [2002.01.31] Orange / Tooi Sora

=== Vinyl ===
- [2001.03.14] Change E.P.
