= List of fortifications in Switzerland =

The list of fortifications in Switzerland contains fortifications from the 15th century to the end of the Cold War.

== Older fortresses ==
In the Middle Ages, towns were fortified with town walls in their defense. From the 19th century fortifications were built near the border at strategically important pass crossings and train tunnels.

- Basel-Kleinhüningen, former French Kleinhüningen Fortress with Rhine bridgehead on the former Schusterinsel (silted up)
- Bern
- Fortification Bellinzona
- Fortification Hauenstein
- Fortification Murten
- Dufour fortifications
- Rheinfelden (Aargau), former fortress town
- Burg Stein (Rheinfelden), former fortress town
- Munot in Schaffhausen
- Sargans Castle on the Rhine
- Solothurn, Fortress town with four artillery towers (from 1534)
- Great St Bernard Pass in Valais
- St. Gotthard, Gotthard Fortress
- Fortress St. Luzisteig in Graubünden, Museum
- Fortress Saint-Maurice, Fortress complex in the Valais, later expanded
- City fortifications of Zürich
- City fortifications of Rapperswil mit bastions and glacis, see Endingerhorn

== Artillery and other fortresses of the Swiss army ==
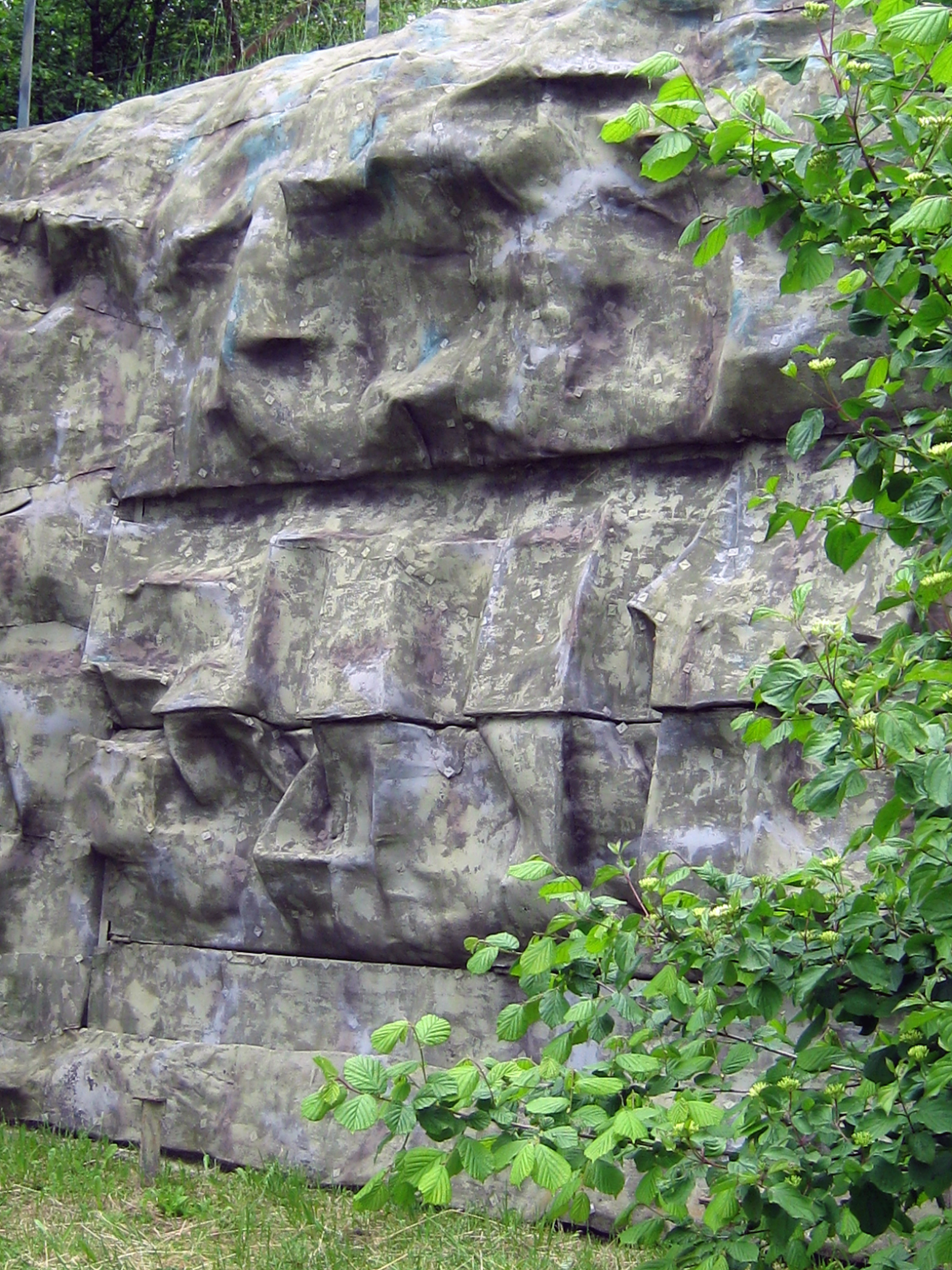
Getarnte Schiessscharte der Festung Reuenthal

The fortresses were largely built during World War II and during Army 61 and decommissioned with Army Reform 1995 and Army XXI. The Swiss Army maintained artillery fortresses equipped with 7.5 cm, 10.5 cm turret cannon or 15 cm guns. The guns were in casemate, turrets or in rearward positions they were in embrasures.

Some have been made accessible as a museum or can be visited on request.

In addition to the artillery works, the infantry blocking points of the infantry were permanently fortified throughout Switzerland.

=== Aargau ===
- Reuenthal / A 4263, Militärmuseum
- Rein / A 3840, P-26, Museum
- Besserstein / A 3856
- Geissberg / A 3863
- Homberg / A 3962

=== Basel-Landschaft ===
- Reisen-Pulfisei / A 3551–53, 3556
- Artilleriestellungen Gempenplateau

=== Bern ===
- Bödeli A 1860–1864, Museum
- Burg / A 2050
- Faulensee / A 1954, Museum
- Grimsel / A 8900
- Hentschenried / A 1953
- Jaunpass / A 1715 bis A 1718
- Krattigen / A 1952, Museum
- Legi / A 1880-L
- Mülenen / A 1970 bis A 1973
- Schmockenfluh / A 1881
- Waldbrand / A 1880, Museum

=== Fribourg ===
- Gross Tosse / A 1750
- Euschels / A 1743
- Im Fang / A 1748

=== Glarus ===
- Beglingen / A 6756
- Niederberg / A 6740
- Ennetberg / A 6723–6730

=== Graubünden-Grisons ===
- Römerstrasse / A 6212
- Tschingel / A 6225, Festungsverein
- Ansstein / A 6256
- Molinära / A 6315
- Haselboden / A 6325
- Nussloch / A 6330
- Tamina / A 6370
- Trin / A 7762, Museum
- Crestawald / A 7833, Museum
- Stalusa / A 8717, Museum

=== Luzern ===
- Mühlefluh / A 2206 bei Vitznau, Museum und «Festungshotel»

=== Nidwalden ===
- Wissiflue / A 2250
- Fürigen / A 2255, Museum
- Kilchlidossen / A 2261
- Ursprung / A 2242
- Mueterschwanderberg / A 2288 (Blattiberg / A 2288.01, Drachenfluh / A 2288.02, Zingel / A 2288.02)

=== Obwalden ===
- Klein-Durren / A 2287

=== Schaffhausen ===
- Blocking points in Schaffhausen und Stein am Rhein
- Munot in Schaffhausen, Zirkularfestung

=== Schwyz ===
- Bannwald / A 6960-63
- Barbara / A 7330 (Rigi)
- Kirchplatte / A 6970-6974
- Verena / A 7341 (Steinerberg)
- Stock / A 7345
- Halsegg / A 7351 und A 7352, Festungs- und Dufourmuseum
- Spitz / A 7347 und A 7348, Museum

=== Solothurn ===
- Gsal / A 3557–60
- Artilleriestellungen Gempenplateau

=== St. Gallen ===
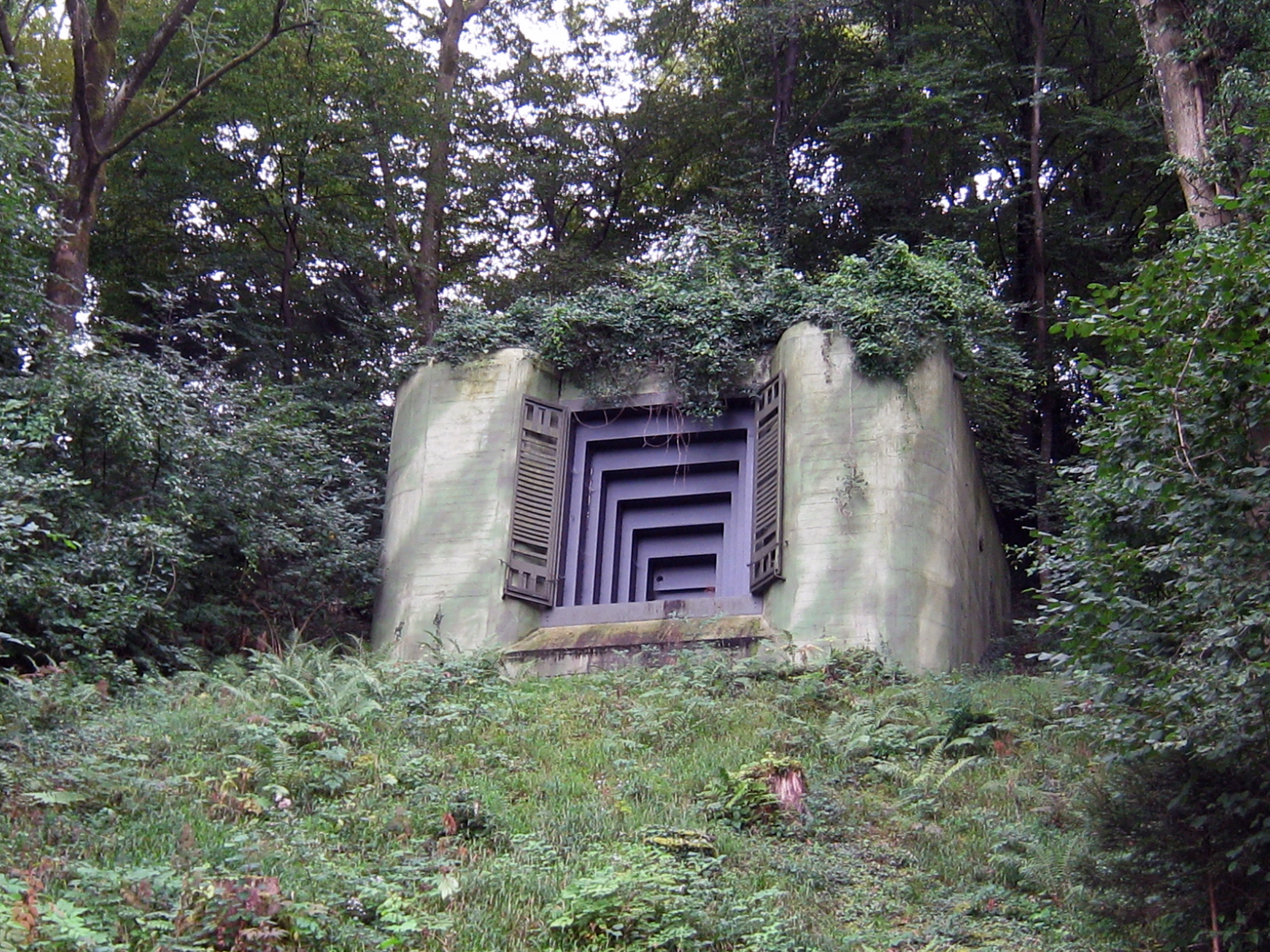
Geschütz der Festung Heldsberg

- Fortress Sargans, Festungsraum
- Fort Heldsberg / A 5850 St. Margrethen Nähe Bodensee, Museum
- Fort Magletsch / A 6020 Wartau, Fortress Sargans, Museum
- Fort Passati / A 6375 Seeztal
- Fort Schollberg / A 6100, Trübbach, Museum
- Fort Furggels / A 6355 St. Margretenberg, Gemeinde Pfäfers, Fortress Sargans, Museum
- Artilleriewerk Tamina / A 6370, Taminaschlucht, Gemeinde Bad Ragaz
- Kastels / A 6400 Mels, Festung Sargans

=== Thurgau ===
- Festungsgürtel Kreuzlingen, Museum

=== Ticino ===
- Fortress Gotthard, Fortress complex
- Fort Motto Bartola (1890), Fortress St. Gotthard
- Forte Airolo (1890–1947), Fortress St. Gotthard, Museum
- Fort Hospiz (1894–1947), Fortress St. Gotthard, Museum
- San Carlo / A 8390, Gotthardfestung
- Foppa Grande / A 8370, Fortress St. Gotthard
- Sasso da Pigna / A 8385, Fortress St. Gotthard, Themenwelt «Sasso San Gottardo».
- Lona-Mondascia A 8157 (Lona-Mairano A 8158), Museum
- Grandinagia A 8444, Val Bedretto

=== Uri ===
- Fort Bäzberg / A 8860 (1892), Fortress St. Gotthard
- Fort Bühl / A 8675 (1892), Fortress St. Gotthard
- Fort Fuchsegg / A 8630, Fortress St. Gotthard
- Gütsch / A 8685, höchstgelegene Fort Europas (Zweiter Weltkrieg), Fortress St. Gotthard
- Isleten / A 8730
- Klausenpass, / A 8744 (Klausenpass)
- Fort Stöckli, (1893–1947), höchstgelegene Festung Europas (Erster Weltkrieg), Fortress St. Gotthard
- Teufelswand / A 8675, Gotthardfestung

=== Valais ===
- Fortress Saint-Maurice, Fortress complex
- Cindey / A 155, Fortress Saint-Maurice, Museum
- Naters / A 9000, Fortress Saint-Maurice, Museum Naters
- Commeire / A 27, Fortress Saint-Maurice, Verein Pro Forteresse
- Champex / A 46, Fortress Saint-Maurice, Museum
- Scex / A 166, Fortress Saint-Maurice, Museum
- Follatères / A 66, Fortress Saint-Maurice

=== Vaud ===
- Champillon / A 365 Fortress Saint-Maurice, Pyromin Museum
- Chillon / A 390, Fortress Saint-Maurice
- Dailly and Savatan / A 250 und A 200, Fortress Saint-Maurice
- Petit-Mont / A 130, Fortress Saint-Maurice
- Toveyres / A 140, Fortress Saint-Maurice
- Pré-Giroud / A 577 bei Vallorbe, Museum
- Saint-George / A 641 West, A 642 Ost Col du Marchairuz
- La Tine A 1651 (links) / A 1652 (rechts)
- Braye / A 1680

=== Zug ===
- Militärhistorische Stiftung des Kantons Zug, Museum
- Bucklen (Unterägeri), Artillery position
- Schüsselbach (Unterägeri), Artillery position

=== Zürich ===
- Ebersberg, Rüdlingen / A 5438, Museum
- Fort Uetliberg
- Zivilschutzbunker Landenberg: Zivilschutz-Museum der Stadt Zürich, Museum

== See also ==
- Bunkerprozess
- Liste von Belagerungen#Frühe Neuzeit (1517–1799)

== Bibliography ==
- Hansjakob Burkhardt: Gotthardfestung - Fortificazione del San Gottardo Foppa Grande, Koller Druck und Kopie, Meggen, 2004 (81 Seiten online-PDF)
- Hansjakob Burkhardt: Die Gotthardfestung "San Carlo", der Prototyp aller Artilleriewerke mit 10,5 cm Turm-Kanonen Mod 1939 L52, Meggen, 2003 (84 Seiten online-PDF)
- Leo Fabrizio: Bunkers. Infolio éditions, Gollion 2004, ISBN 2-88474-008-2 GMS-Anlageliste mit Standorten (PDF; 10,9 kB)
- Christian Schwager: Falsche Chalets. Edition Patrick Frey c/o Scalo Zürich, 2004, ISBN 3-905509-49-0 GMS-Anlageliste mit Standorten (PDF; 17,6 kB)
