= Dailly (surname) =

Dailly is a surname. Notable people with the surname include:

- Christian Dailly, a Scottish former football player
- Eleonore Dailly, an American filmmaker
- Eileen Dailly, a Canadian politician
- Mike Dailly (lawyer), a member of the Govan Law Centre
- Mike Dailly (game designer), a Scottish video game designer
- Paul Dailly, a retired Scottish-Canadian soccer player

== See also ==
- Dailly, a village in South Ayrshire, Scotland
- Fort de Dailly, a part of Fortress Saint-Maurice in Switzerland
- Dailey
- Daly (disambiguation)
