= Mike Dailly =

Mike Dailly may refer to:

- Mike Dailly (lawyer) (fl. 2000s), Scottish lawyer and social justice campaigner
- Mike Dailly (game designer) (fl. 1980s–2020s), Scottish game designer

== See also ==
- Mike Dailey (fl. 1980s–2010s), American football coach
- Mike Daly (fl. 2000s–2010s), American record producer and musician
- Michael Daly (disambiguation)
- Michael Daley (disambiguation)
