= Fort de Chillon =

20th century fortification on the edge of Lake Geneva, Switzerland

- Western Switzerland
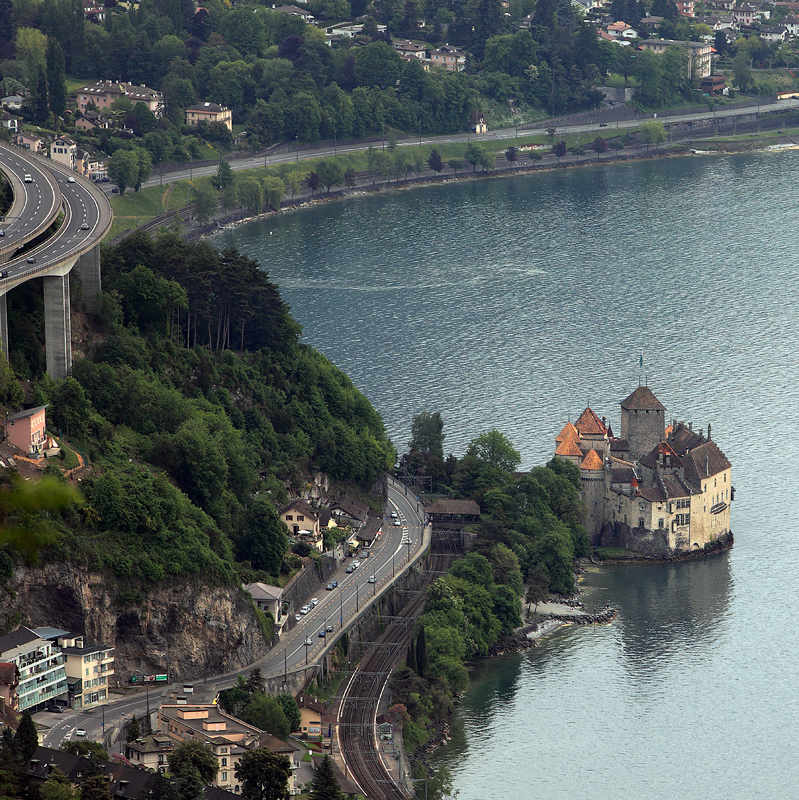
- The fort is in the hillside between the autoroute viaduct and the lower road, opposite Chillon Castle

Site information
- Owner: Private
- Controlled by: Switzerland
- Open to the public: Yes
- Condition: Preserved

Location
- Location within Switzerland
- Coordinates: 46°24′51″N 06°55′45″E

Site history
- Built: 1942
- Materials: Rock excavation

The Fort de Chillon is a twentieth-century fortification directly adjacent to the medieval Château de Chillon on the edge of Lake Geneva in Switzerland. The fort secures the road and rail lines that pass along the lakeshore running east from Lausanne to the mountainous interior of Switzerland. The position is an advanced work protecting the approaches to Fortress Saint-Maurice, part of the Swiss National Redoubt. Deactivated as a military post in 1995, it is privately owned and has been converted into a museum.

== Description ==
The Fort de Chillon lies directly adjacent to the Château de Chillon, a major tourist attraction. The site has been fortified since at least the 12th century. The Fort de Chillon is a mixed infantry-artillery fort, located almost entirely underground in the steep slope rising to Veytaux above the rail line. The location is spanned by the Viaduc de Chillon. Built at the opening of the Second World War (1941), it was armed with a mixture of 75 mm guns and 90 mm anti-tank guns. Initial work was completed in 1942. The fort was designated A390 in the Swiss fortification nomenclature. The ensemble included permanent and rapidly deployable anti-tank obstacles, designed to stall or trap an enemy while the fort's weapons fired on them.

The fort was initially armed with two 75 mm anti-tank guns for direct fire, replaced with 90 mm guns in 1962. Two other 75 mm guns were retained until 1978. Two additional 90mm guns and five machine guns completed the offensive armament. Defensive arms included two machine guns each at the Rocher de Veytaux and Montagnette, with three at Champ-Babaud, along with two 81 mm mortars. Infantry bunkers command the road and rail lines adjacent to the castle, linked to the main fort by underground galleries.

The Fort de Chillon was manned by units of Mountain Brigade 10. The garrison comprised 131 men. Nine detached bunkers were provided for infantry forces defending the surface of the installation.

This position was covered from the direction of Saint-Maurice by the Fort de Champillon, an artillery fort. The Chablais plain to the south was covered by additional fortifications. The Chablais and Chillon ensembles were not considered part of Fortress Saint-Maurice proper, but were important advance works to delay and weaken an attacker before they reached the Saint-Maurice stopping line, or fort d'arrêt. The entire region is fortified with anti-tank barriers, permanent minefields and other barriers, while tunnels, bridges and retaining walls are mined or prepared for demolition.

== Present status ==
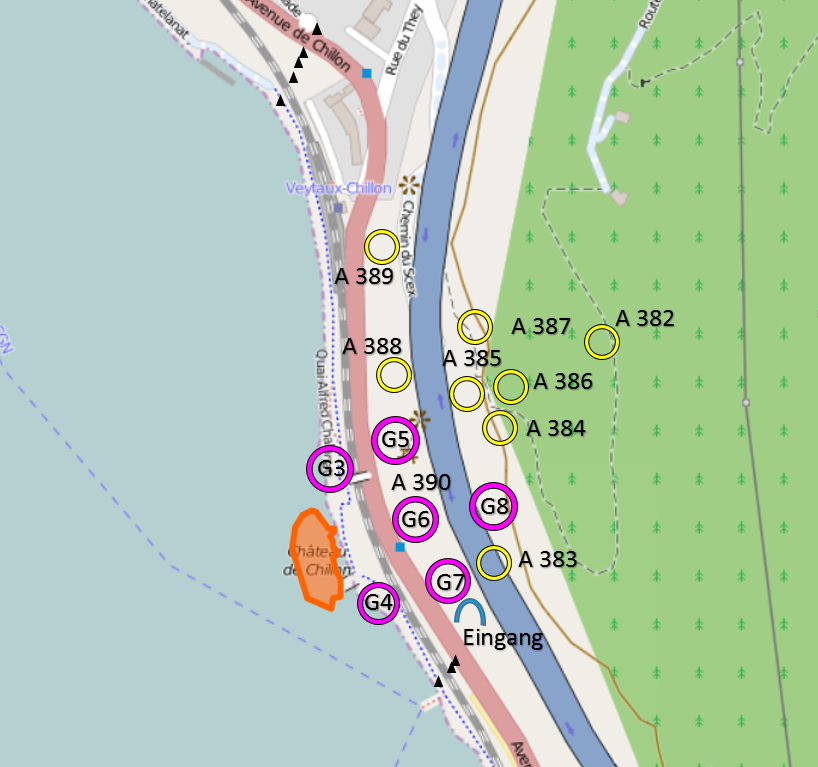
Plan of the fort, with casemates in magenta and tunneled positions in yellow

As a result of the reorganization of Swiss fortifications under the Army 95 program, the fort was deactivated and declared surplus. Chillon was considered for purchase by the Canton of Vaud in 1998 and was briefly opened for public tours, with the intention of making it into a museum. However, the transaction fell through. The town of Chillon waived its rights in 2004, followed by the neighboring town of Veytaux. In 2010 the property was purchased by investors who planned to make the site a wine storage facility and tasting facility. Tours are available.
