= Fort de Champillon =

Artillery fort in Corbeyrier, Switzerland

- Western Switzerland

Site information
- Owner: Private
- Controlled by: Switzerland
- Open to the public: Planned
- Condition: Preserved

Location
- Coordinates: 46.3413°N 6.95369°E

Site history
- Built: 1942
- Materials: Rock excavation

The Fort de Champillon is a twentieth-century Swiss fortification located in the heights overlooking the Rhône valley from the north between Montreux and Monthey. Completed in 1944, the fort secures the road and rail lines running east from Lausanne to the mountainous interior of Switzerland. The position is an advanced work protecting the approaches to Fortress Saint-Maurice, part of the Swiss National Redoubt. It is entered from the plateau just downhill from Corbeyrier, a village on the heights at the foot of the Tour d'Aï.

== Description ==
The Fort de Champillon (Swiss Armed Forces designation A365) is an artillery fort, intended to provide coverage to advanced positions in the Chablais plan at the eastern end of Lac Léman, and to support advanced positions such as the Fort de Chillon to the west and other positions to the south. The Chablais and Chillon forts were not considered part of Fortress Saint-Maurice proper, but were important advance works to delay and weaken an attacker before they reached the Saint-Maurice stopping line, or fort d'arrêt. The entire region is fortified with anti-tank barriers, permanent minefields and other barriers, while tunnels, bridges and retaining walls are mined or prepared for demolition. Construction at Champillon began in 1942, and was complete in 1944.

The fort is located in a massif overlooking the Rhône beneath Corbeyrier. The shelf stands high over the flat floor of the Rhône valley, which in this area is known as the Chablais plain. The Fort de Champillon is armed with two 105 mm guns in northwest-facing casemates, cut into the rock face of the west-facing cliff. An underground passage runs back into the mountain to ammunition magazines, utility areas and two-story underground barracks. The fort's entrance is on the plateau behind the fort. Two additional 105mm casemates, each with their own magazine, were planned but never built.

A variety of smaller blockhouses, observation posts, anti-tank lines and infantry shelters are in the immediate area, none connected directly to Champillon.

The position was manned by elements of Fortress Regiment 19, and was designated part of Fortress Group 4.

== Present situation ==
The Fort de Champillon was decommissioned in 1994 and sold to private owners in 2005. In 2010 plans were announced to install the Swiss Explosives Museum in the site, called Pyromin. A portion of the fort is used by NL Pyrotechnics as a warehouse. The fort and museum are planned to be opened to the public.
