= Michael Daly =

Michael Daly may refer to:

== Sportspeople ==
- Michael Daly (soccer) (born 1987), American soccer player
- Mike Daly (American football), American football coach
- Mike Daly (Canadian football) (born 1990), Canadian football defensive back

== Others ==
- Michael J. Daly (1924–2008), United States Army officer and Medal of Honor recipient
- Michael Daly (journalist), author and special contributor to The Daily Beast
- Mike Daly, producer, songwriter and multi-instrumentalist
- Michael Daly, a character in the film 360
- Michael Christopher Daly (born 1953), geologist

== See also ==
- Mike Dailly (disambiguation)
- Michael Daly Hawkins (born 1954), judge on the United States Court of Appeals for the Ninth Circuit
- Michael Daley (disambiguation)
