= Operation Tannenbaum =

Planned Axis invasion of Switzerland in World War II

- Part of World War II
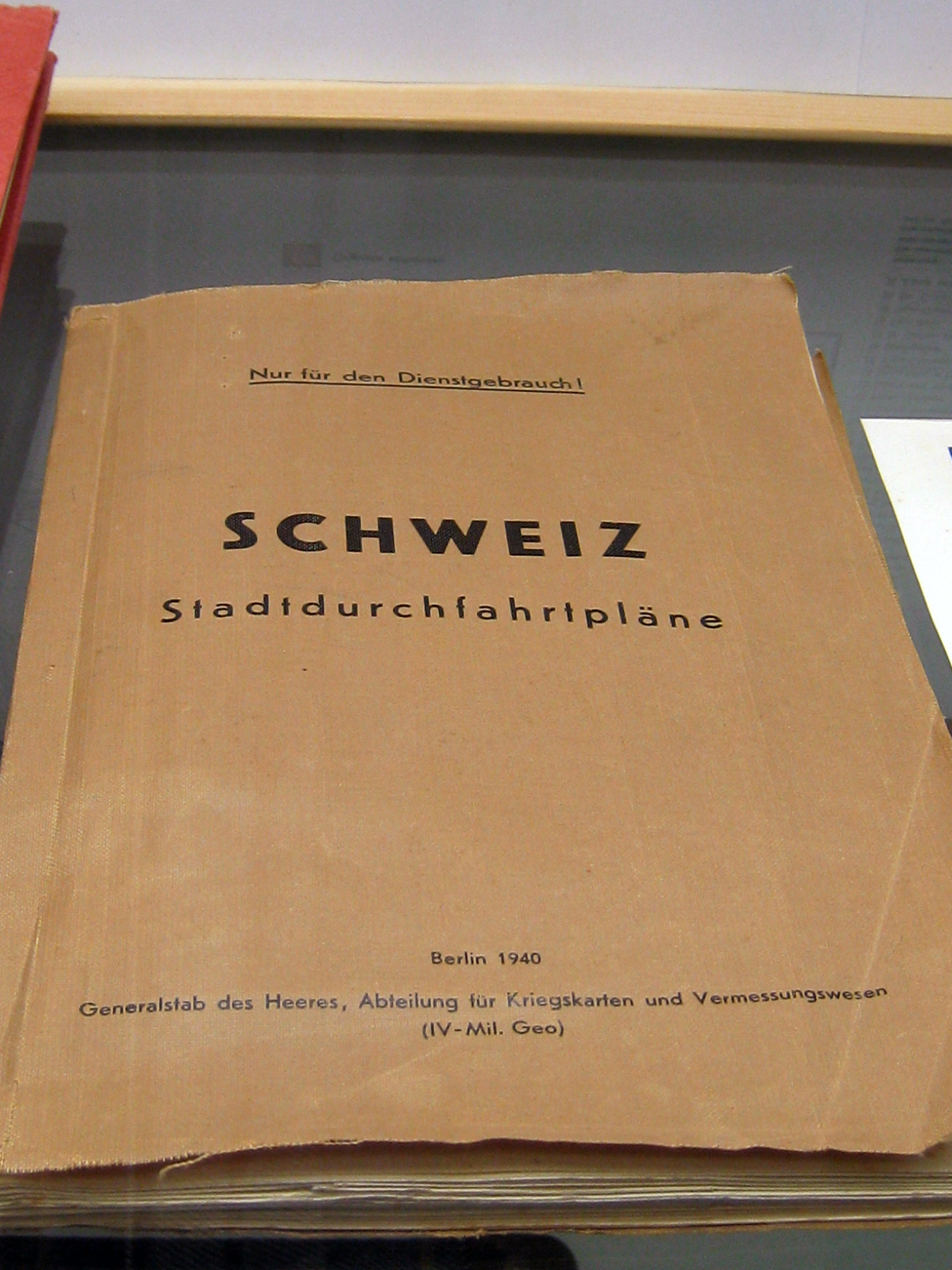
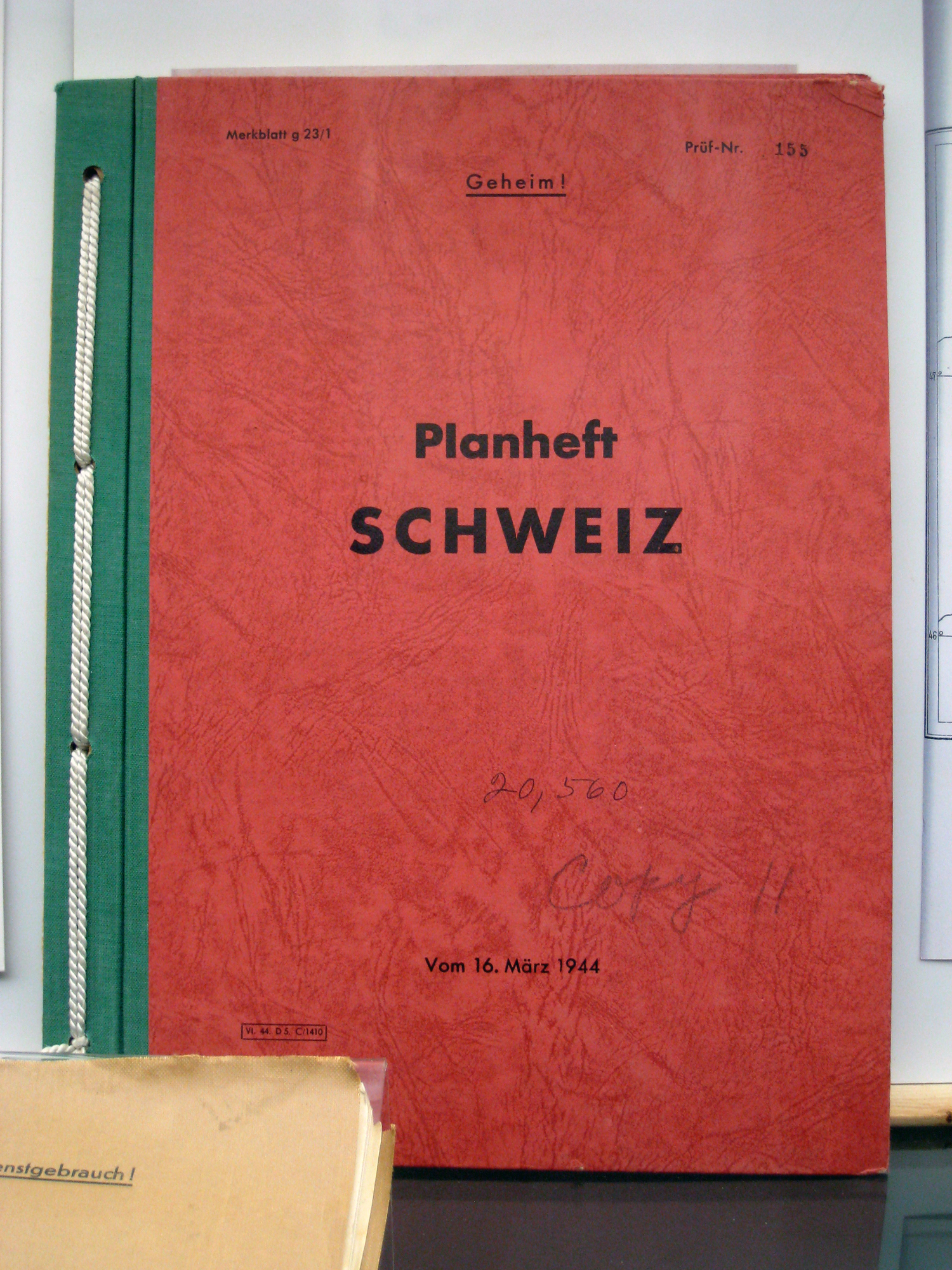
- German plans for the invasion, occupation, and/or annexation of Switzerland & Liechtenstein, dated 1940 and March 1944
Date	1940–1944
Location	Switzerland and Liechtenstein
Result	Operation aborted after the Allied invasion of France

Belligerents
Germany; Italy; Vichy France (until 1942)	Switzerland; Liechtenstein

Operation Tannenbaum ("Fir Tree"), known earlier as Operation Grün ("Green"), was a planned invasion of Switzerland and Liechtenstein by the Axis powers during World War II.

== Background ==
Before the outbreak of the Second World War, Adolf Hitler made repeated assurances that Germany would respect Swiss neutrality in the event of a conflict in Europe. In February 1937, he assured the Swiss Federal Councillor Edmund Schulthess that "at all times, whatever happens, we will respect the inviolability and neutrality of Switzerland", reiterating this promise shortly before the German invasion of Poland. These were, however, purely political maneuvers intended to guarantee Switzerland's passivity. Nazi Germany planned to end Switzerland's independence after it had defeated its enemies on the continent.

=== Nazi attitudes towards Switzerland ===
In a meeting held with Fascist Italy's leader, Benito Mussolini, and Foreign Minister Galeazzo Ciano, in June 1941, Hitler stated his opinion on Switzerland quite plainly:

"Switzerland possesses the most disgusting and miserable people and political system. The Swiss are the mortal enemies of the new Germany."

In a later discussion, the German Foreign Minister Joachim von Ribbentrop directly alluded to the possibility of dividing Switzerland between the two Axis powers: "On the Duce's query whether Switzerland, as a true anachronism, had any future, the Foreign Minister smiled and told the Duce that he would have to discuss this with the Führer."

In August 1942, Hitler further described Switzerland as "a pimple on the face of Europe" and as a state that no longer had a right to exist, denouncing the Swiss people as "a misbegotten branch of our Volk." From a Nazi viewpoint, Switzerland, as a small, multilingual, decentralized democracy where German-speakers felt more of an affinity with their French-speaking fellow Swiss citizens than towards the German speaking people living across the border, was the antithesis of the racially homogeneous and collectivised "Führer State". Hitler also believed that the independent Swiss state had come into existence at a time of temporary weakness of the Holy Roman Empire, and now that German power had been re-established after the National Socialist takeover, the independent country of Switzerland had become obsolete.

Although Hitler despised the democratically minded German Swiss as the "wayward branch of the German people", he still acknowledged their status as Germans. Furthermore, the openly pan-German political aims of the Nazi party called for the unification of all Germans into a Greater Germany, which included the Swiss people. The first goal of the 25-point National Socialist Program stated that "We [the National Socialist Party] demand the unification of all Germans in the Greater Germany on the basis of the people's right to self-determination."

In their maps of Greater Germany, German textbooks included the Netherlands, Belgium, Austria, Bohemia-Moravia, the German-speaking parts of Switzerland, and western Poland from Danzig (Gdańsk in Polish) to Krakau (Kraków). Ignoring Switzerland's status as a sovereign state, these maps frequently showed its territory as a German Gau. The author of one of these textbooks, Ewald Banse, explained:

Quite naturally we count you Swiss as offshoots of the German nation, along with the Dutch, the Flemings, the Lorrainers, the Alsatians, the Austrians and the Bohemians ... One day we will group ourselves around a single banner, and whosoever shall wish to separate us, we will exterminate!

Various Nazis were vocal about the German intent to "expand Germany's boundaries to the farthest limits of the old Holy Roman Empire, and even beyond."

Although the geopolitician Karl Haushofer was not politically aligned with the Nazis, his ideas offered them ideological support. In his work, he advocated for the partition of Switzerland among its surrounding countries, such that Romandy (Welschland) would be awarded to Vichy France, Ticino to Italy, and Northern, Central, and Eastern Switzerland to Germany.

=== Nazi attitudes toward Liechtenstein ===
Shortly after the Anschluss of Austria, the Volksdeutsche Mittelstelle, in connection with the German National Movement in Liechtenstein (VDBL), a Nazi organization in Liechtenstein, planned for the VBDL to be democratically elected into power via funding from Germany, then it would end the customs union with Switzerland and align towards Germany, leading to an eventual annexation of Liechtenstein into Germany. The plans were reportedly supported by Joseph Goebbels. However, it was personally blocked by Hitler himself on 18 March 1938 as he did not want to complicate relations with Switzerland.

In March 1939, Franz Joseph II, Prince of Liechtenstein along with prime minister Josef Hoop paid an official visit to Berlin where they met Hitler and Ribbentrop to discuss safeguarding Liechtenstein's independence and ensuring good relations. Franz Joseph later reminisced on the visit and stated that Hitler showed little interest in them and that it only took place in order to "flatter Hitler's ego".

In the same month the VBDL staged a coup attempt in which it was planned for VBDL members to march on Vaduz and attempt to seize control of the government, which was hoped to cause clashes between them and the government. German troops from Feldkirch would then move into Liechtenstein after a call for help and incorporate the country into Germany. However, this plan failed as the marchers were stopped by opposing parties before they could reach Vaduz and Hitler blocked any invasion into Liechtenstein following intervention by deputy prime minister Alois Vogt.

Despite this, the coup was only prevented by Hitler due to his desire to avoid provoking a war with Switzerland, as Switzerland and Liechtenstein had been in a customs union since 1924. Liechtenstein was intended to be invaded alongside Switzerland and be included in the partitioning, where Liechtenstein would be annexed into Germany.

== Military preparations ==
The Swiss government approved an increase in defense spending, with a first instalment of 15 million Swiss francs (out of a total multi-year budget of 100 million francs) to go toward modernization of the armed forces. With Hitler's renunciation of the Treaty of Versailles in 1935, this spending jumped to 90 million francs. The K31 became the standard-issue infantry rifle in 1933, and nearly 350,000 would be produced.

In peacetime, Switzerland has no officer with a rank higher than that of Korpskommandant (3-star-general). However, in times of war and in 'need', the Bundesversammlung elects a General to command the army and air force. On 30 August 1939, Henri Guisan was elected General, with 204 votes out of 227 cast. He immediately began preparations for war.

When, two days after his election, the Wehrmacht invaded Poland and World War II began, Guisan called for a general mobilisation and issued Operationsbefehl Nr. 1, the first of what was to become a series of evolving defensive plans. This first plan assigned the existing three army corps to the east, north, and west of Switzerland, with reserves in the centre and south of the country. Guisan reported to the Federal Council on September 7 that by the time Britain declared war on Germany, "our entire army had been in its operational positions for ten minutes." He also had his Chief of the General Staff increase the upper service eligibility age from 48 to 60 years (men of these ages would form the rear-echelon Landsturm units), and ordered the formation of an entirely new army corps of 100,000 men.

Germany started planning the invasion of Switzerland on 25 June 1940, the day that France surrendered. At this point, the German army in France consisted of three groups with two million soldiers in 102 divisions. Recognizing that Switzerland and Liechtenstein were surrounded by Occupied France and the Axis Powers, Guisan issued Operationsbefehl Nr. 10, a complete overhaul of existing Swiss defensive plans. In this plan, the Fortress Saint-Maurice, the Gotthard Pass in the south, and the Fortress Sargans in the northeast would serve as the defence line. The Alps would be their fortress. The Swiss 2nd, 3rd, and 4th Army Corps were to stage delaying actions at the border, while all who were able were to retreat to the Alpine refuge known as the Réduit national. The population centres were, however, all located in the flat plains in the north of the country. They would have to be abandoned to the German forces in order for the rest of the country to survive.

After the armistice with France, Hitler demanded to see plans for the invasion of Switzerland. Franz Halder, the head of the Oberkommando des Heeres (OKH), recalled: "I was constantly hearing of outbursts of Hitler's fury against Switzerland, which, given his mentality, might have led at any minute to military activities for the army." Captain Otto-Wilhelm Kurt von Menges in OKH submitted a draft plan for the invasion. Generaloberst Wilhelm Ritter von Leeb's Heeresgruppe 'C (HGr. C), led by Generalleutnant Wilhelm List and the 12th Army would conduct the attack. Leeb himself personally reconnoitered the terrain, studying the most promising invasion routes and paths of least resistance. Menges noted in his plan that Swiss resistance was unlikely and that a nonviolent Anschluss was the most likely result. With "the current political situation in Switzerland," he wrote, "it might accede to ultimatum demands in a peaceful manner, so that after a warlike border crossing a rapid transition to a peaceful invasion must be assured."

The German plan continued to undergo revision until October, when the 12th Army submitted its fourth draft, now called Operation Tannenbaum. The original plan had called for 21 German divisions, but that figure was downsized to 11 by the OKH. Halder himself had studied the border areas, and concluded that the "Jura frontier offers no favorable base for an attack. Switzerland rises, in successive waves of forest-covered terrain across the axis of an attack. The crossing points on the river Doubs and the border are few; the Swiss frontier position is strong." He decided on an infantry feint in the Jura in order to draw out the Swiss Army and then cut it off in the rear, as had been done in France. With the 11 German divisions and roughly 15 more Italian divisions prepared to enter from the south, the Axis plans were to invade Switzerland with somewhere between 300,000 and 500,000 men.

For reasons that are still uncertain, Hitler never ordered the invasion. One theory is that neutral Switzerland was useful to hide Nazi gold and to serve as a refuge for war criminals in case of defeat. This may also be the reason for Germany's continued recognition of Switzerland's neutrality.

A simpler explanation is that Germany would have reaped little strategic gain in conquering Switzerland, while a drawn-out and costly alpine war might have ensued if Germany attacked. Perhaps Nazi Germany was preoccupied with other military matters. Although the Wehrmacht feigned moves against Switzerland in its offensives, it never attempted to invade. Operation Tannenbaum was put on hold after D-Day.

== German plans for Nazi rule in Switzerland ==
Germany's political objective in the expected conquest of Switzerland was to regain the bulk of the "racially suitable" Swiss population for the German people, and aimed at direct annexation into the German Reich of at least its ethnic German parts.

With this purpose in mind, Heinrich Himmler in September 1941 discussed with his subordinate, Gottlob Berger, the suitability of various people for the position of Reichskommissar for the 'reunion' of Switzerland with Germany. This yet-to-be-chosen official would have had the task of facilitating the total amalgamation (Zusammenwachsen) of the Swiss and German populations. Himmler further attempted to expand the SS into Switzerland, with the formation of the Germanische SS Schweiz in 1942.

A document named Aktion S, found in the Himmler files, detailed at length the planned process for the establishment of Nazi rule in Switzerland from its initial conquest by the Wehrmacht up to its complete consolidation as a German province. It is not known whether this plan was endorsed by any high-level members of the German government.

After the Second Armistice at Compiègne in June 1940, the German Interior Ministry produced a memorandum on the annexation of a strip of eastern France from the mouth of the Somme river to Lake Geneva, intended as a reserve for post-war German colonisation. The planned dissection of Switzerland would have accorded with this new French-German border, annexing the French-speaking region of Romandy into the Reich despite the linguistic difference.

=== Italian involvement ===
Germany's wartime ally Italy, under the rule of Benito Mussolini, desired the Italian-speaking areas of Switzerland as part of its irredentist claims in Europe, particularly the Swiss cantons of Ticino and Grisons. In a tour of the Italian alpine regions, Mussolini stated to his entourage that "the New Europe ... could not have more than four or five large states; the small ones [would] have no further raison d'être and [would] have to disappear".

Switzerland's future in an Axis-dominated Europe was further discussed in a 1940 round-table conference between Italian foreign minister Galeazzo Ciano and German foreign minister Joachim von Ribbentrop, also attended by Hitler. Ciano proposed that in the event of Switzerland's dissolution, it should be divided along the central chain of the Western Alps, since Italy desired the areas to the south of this demarcation line as part of its own war aims. This would have left Italy in control of Ticino, Valais, and Graubünden.

== See also ==
- History of Switzerland
- History of Liechtenstein
- Italian Empire
- National Redoubt (Switzerland)
- Switzerland during the world wars

== Sources ==
- Codevilla, Angelo. Between the Alps and a Hard Place: Switzerland in World War II and Moral Blackmail Today Washington, D.C.: Regnery, 2000.
- Halbrook, Stephen P. The Swiss and the Nazis: How the Alpine Republic Survived in the Shadow of the Third Reich. Philadelphia: Casemate, 2006.
- Halbrook, Stephen P. Target Switzerland: Swiss Armed Neutrality in World War II. Rockville Centre, N.Y.: Sarpedon, 1998.
- Karsh, Efraim. Neutrality and Small States: The European Experience in World War Two and Beyond. New York: Routledge, 1988.
- Kreis, Georg, ed. Switzerland and the Second World War. Portland, Ore.: Frank Cass, 2000.
- Resultate der Wahlen des Bundesrats, der Bundeskanzler, und des Generals Seite. Bern: Schweizer Bundesversammlungsdienst, n.d.
- Steinberg, Jonathan. Why Switzerland? Cambridge, UK: Cambridge University Press, 1996.
- Tagesbefehle des Generals, 1939–1945. Bern: Eidg. Militärbibliothek, n.d.
- Tanner, Stephen. Refuge from the Reich: American Airmen and Switzerland during World War II. Rockville Centre, N.Y.: Sarpedon, 2000.
- Urner, Klaus. "Let's Swallow Switzerland": Hitler's Plans Against the Swiss Confederation. Lanham, Md.: Lexington Books, 2001.
- Vagts, Detlev F. "Switzerland, International Law and World War II." The American Journal of International Law 91.3 (July 1997), 466–475.
- Weinberg, Gerhard L. A World at Arms: A Global History of World War II. 2nd Edition. New York: Cambridge University Press, 2005.
- Weinberg, Gerhard L. "German Plans and Policies Regarding Neutral Nations in World War II with Special Reference to Switzerland." German Studies Review 22.1 (February 1999), 99–103.
- Williamson, Gordon. Gebirgsjäger: German Mountain Trooper, 1939–1945. Oxford: Osprey, 2003.
- Williamson, Gordon. German Mountain & Ski Troops, 1939–1945. Oxford: Osprey, 1996.
- Geiger, Peter (2007). Der Kleinstaat in der Ära der Weltkriege (PDF) (in German). Schaan: Liechtenstein Institute, Liechtensteinischen Akademischen Gesellschaft. pp. 141–143.
