= Folwark =

Type of feudal large-scale farm

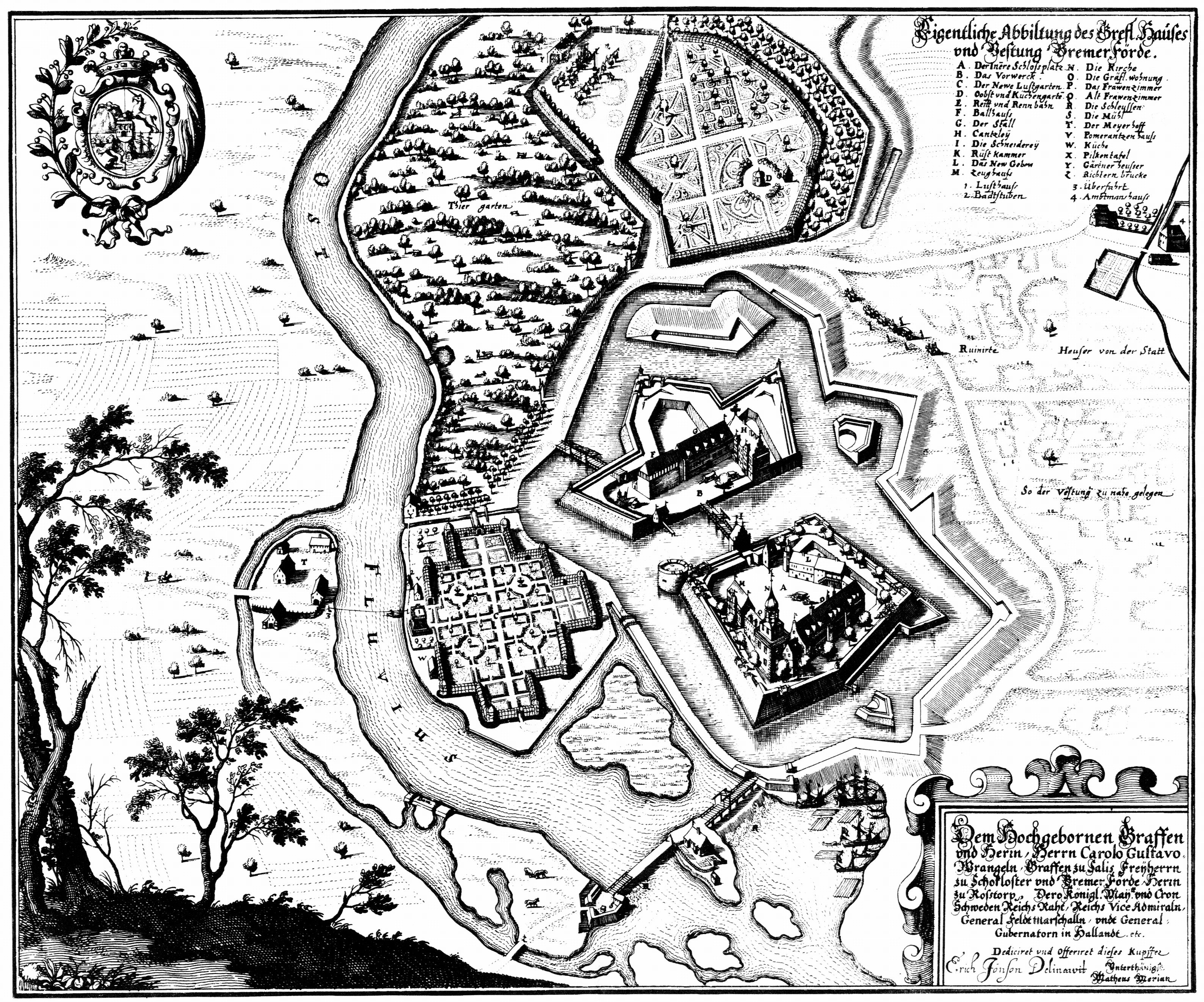
The term in its original sense: Bremervörde Castle with the fortified Vorwerk (marked B).

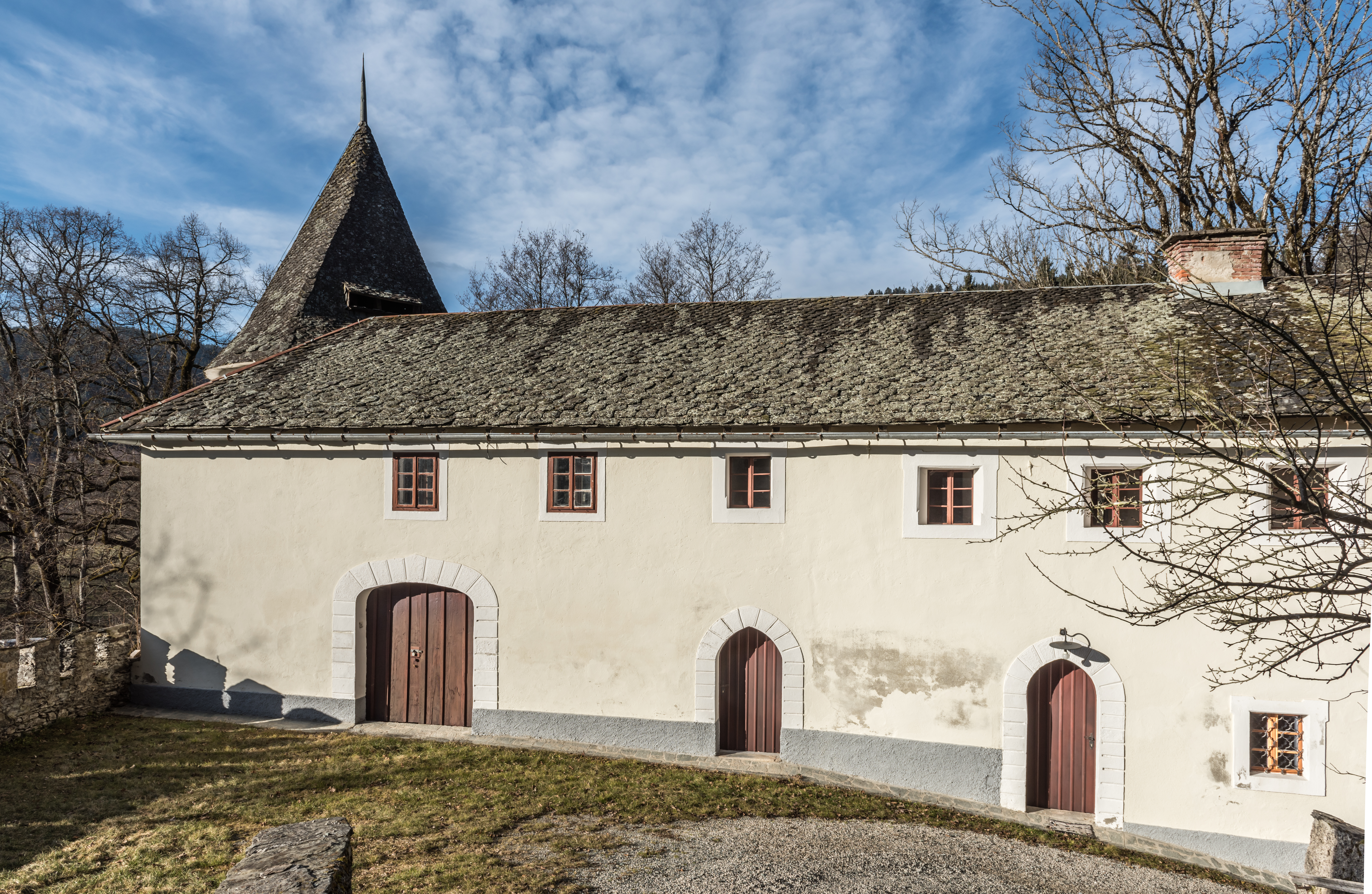
Vorwerk (administrator's lodge) of Frauenstein Castle, Carinthia, Austria.

Folwark (Note: Polish: Folwark; German: Vorwerk; Ukrainian: Фільварок; Filvarok; Belarusian: Фальварак; Falvarak; Lithuanian: Palivarkas; Latvian: Folverks, Folvarks, Pusmuiža) is a Polish word derived from the German Vorwerk. A Polish: folwark or Vorwerk is an agricultural estate or a separate branch operation of such an estate, historically a serfdom-based farm and agricultural enterprise (a type of latifundium), often very large. The term has changed its meaning several times throughout history and can therefore be used in various ways.

Originally, the associated agricultural estates were usually located outside fortifications or castles and directly in front of them, and were therefore often referred to as Polish: folwark or, in German-speaking regions, Vorwerk, meaning advanced work or outwork, a kind of outlying defensive outpost. In place names and field names, the word can still be present in this meaning.

Later, the term was used for outposts of manor farms with estate operations or individual tenant farms. On larger estates with extensive land areas, there were often smaller and more remote branch operations in addition to the main operation. From around the end of the 18th century, these were also frequently referred to as Polish: folwark or, in German-speaking regions, Vorwerk. In this sense, Folwark or Vorwerk appears as a name or part of a name for a variety of settlements, especially in the northern and eastern parts of Germany.

A term occasionally used in official documents for a Polish: folwark or Vorwerk is "pertinentia" (accessory).

== History ==
Polish: Folwarks (Lithuanian: palivarkai, Belarusian: фальваркі) were operated in the Crown of Poland from the 14th century, in the Grand Duchy of Lithuania from the 15th century and in the joint Polish–Lithuanian Commonwealth from the second half of the 16th century. The institution survived after the 18th-century Partitions of Poland until the early-20th century.

Folwarks aimed to produce surplus produce for export. The first folwarks were created on Church- and monastery-owned lands. Later, the folwark system was adopted both by the nobility (Polish: szlachta) and by rich peasants (singular: folwarksołtys}}), but the sołtys positions were eventually taken over by the szlachta.

The term folwark came into the Polish language in the 14th century from the German Vorwerk, originally the fortified advanced work of a castle and later an outlying manor house that managed a farm estate. The English translation would be "grange", the historical meaning of which is "an outlying farm with tithe barns belonging to a monastery or feudal lord".

The development of folwarks was boosted by growing demand for grain and by the profitability of its export, both to Western Europe and within the Polish–Lithuanian Commonwealth. That led to the exploitation of serfdom since landowners discovered that instead of collecting money-based rent and taxes, it was more profitable to force the peasantry to work on folwarks. Folwark-based grain export became an important part of the economy of the Polish–Lithuanian Commonwealth.

Folwarks were primarily an early modern postfeudal rural formation. They originated as land belonging to a feudal lord (early on a knight) and were not rented out to peasants but worked by the owner's own hired labor or servants. The peasants toiled on the lots that they rented from the lord and were obliged to provide complimentary labour for the lord on his folwark, originally a few days per year. From the 16th century, the amount of this mandatory free labor was radically increased, and szlachta-sponsored legislation imposed rigid conditions on the peasants, such as the prohibition on worker's right to leave a village and seek a new lord. The originally-free peasants became serfs and then fell into a condition of extreme dependency and exploitation, known in Poland as wtórne poddaństwo [secondary serfdom]. Their lords, in turn, had become dependent on such free labour, which kept the folwark economy going and competitive on the European grain markets.

In Poland, serfdom was regulated and increased by the Statutes of Piotrków (1496) and by the Privilege of Toruń (1520), statutory privileges granted by kings to szlachta. With the fall of prices of agricultural goods at the end of the 17th century, the folwark economy went into crisis, and attempts by the szlachta to increase production by increasing the size of their folwarks (usually by appropriating peasant lands) and by demanding more labour (usually by increasing the peasant workload) only compounded the economic crisis and further worsened the fate of the peasants, who had been no poorer than their average counterparts in Western Europe.

In Lithuania, serfdom was fully established during the Volok Reform in the mid-16th century.

Until the late 18th century folwarks remained the basis of szlachta economic and political power. After the abolition of serfdom in Poland from the late 18th century onwards, folwarks used paid labour.

Folwarks were abolished by the People's Republic of Poland with the Polish Committee of National Liberation decree of 6 September 1944, concerned with agricultural reform. After the end of the Second World War, folwarks were nationalised at the behest of the Polish Workers' Party, resulting in PGRs, state-owned collective rural enterprises (Państwowe Gospodarstwo Rolne, 1949 onwards) or partitioned, usually with little or no compensation to their owners.

In modern-day Latvia, the terms folverks, folvarks and folverķis were mostly used in Latgale and Augšzeme (eastern Selonia) until the 20th century. In other regions, the German-origin word pusmuiža (pmž.; from Halbgutshof) was more common.

== See also ==
- Hacienda
- Ranch
- Manorialism
- Serfdom
