= Grotte aux Fées (Switzerland) =

Cave and underground waterfall in Switzerland

Coordinates: 46°13′22.73″N 7°00′06.23″E

- Feengrotte
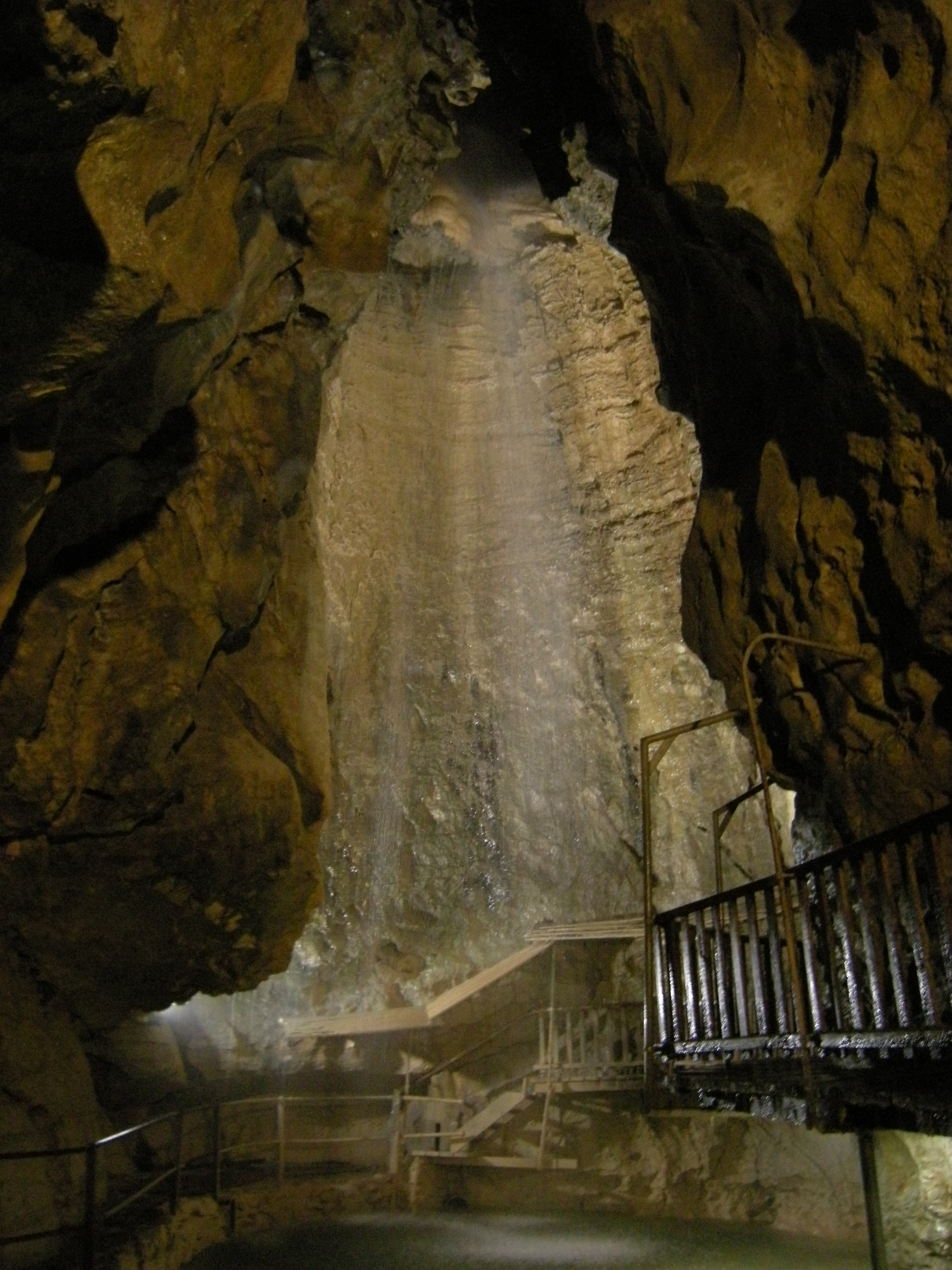
- Grotte aux Fées underground waterfall

- Location within Switzerland Location within Canton of Valais
- Location: Saint-Maurice; Canton of Valais; Switzerland
- Length: 3,630 m (11,910 ft)
- Elevation: 249 m (817 ft)
- Geology: Karst cave
- Access: Public

The Grotte aux Fées (lit. 'Cave of the Fairies') in the cliffs above Saint-Maurice in the Swiss canton of Valais, is a natural limestone solution show cave, featuring a 77-metre (253 ft) high underground waterfall (Cascade de la grotte aux Fées), claimed as the world's highest waterfall in a show cave. The cave was the first show cave in Switzerland.

== History ==
The cave was known until the mid 19th century as the Trou aux Fayes or "Sheep Hole," as it was used as a sheepfold. The cave was known from Roman times, but was first publicized in 1863 as a tourist attraction, with the present name being used since 1865.

The cave was explored in 1831 when a party mapped 600 metres (2,000 ft) of passages was known. From 1863, Professor Chanoine Gard of the Abbey College of Saint-Maurice cleared passageways and conducted tours on behalf of an orphanage that he had founded. From 1865, the cave was operated by the Sisters of Saint-Maurice, who coined the cave's present name. In 1925, additional exploration extended to the cave network from the top of the waterfall.

Between 1935 and 1936, the cave was connected to Fort du Scex, which occupies the same cliff. The cave in turn was connected to Fort de Cindey between 1941 and 1946, forming part of the fortifications of Fortress Saint-Maurice and providing an underground connection between the two fortifications.

== Description ==
The cave network includes the 504 metres (1,654 ft) long tourist gallery, the 1,200-metre (3,900 ft) long Galerie des Morts and the 2,184-metre (7,165 ft) long Fairies' Cave section, with an elevation difference of 122 metres (400 ft). A 2010 exploration linked the Grotte aux Fées to the nearby Grotte de Saint-Martin No.1, totaling 3,630 metres (11,910 ft) in length and 249 metres (817 ft) in elevation.

The guided tour follows a 500-metre (1,600 ft) trail, ending at the waterfall. The waterfall is fed by water from the nearby Dents du Midi peaks. The cave and both forts may be visited during summer months.

== See also ==
- List of caves in Switzerland
- List of waterfalls in Switzerland
