= Fortress Saint-Maurice =

Fortification complex in Switzerland

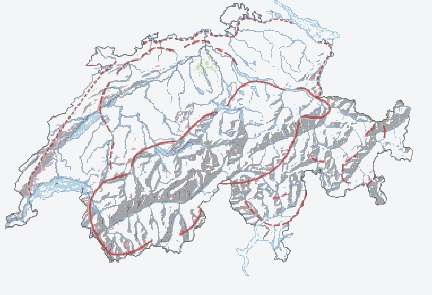
The Swiss National Redoubt, outlined in heavy red

Fortress Saint-Maurice is one of the three main fortification complexes comprising the Swiss National Redoubt. The westernmost of the three, Fortress Saint-Maurice complements Fortress Saint Gotthard and Fortress Sargans to secure the central alpine region of Switzerland against an invading force. The National Redoubt was first conceived in the 1880s as an easily defensible area to secure the survival of the Swiss Confederation. In the late 1930s and 1940s when neutral Switzerland was threatened with invasion from Germany, the National Redoubt and its components were modernized and expanded on a massive scale. The fortification system was maintained and upgraded during the Cold War. With the collapse of the Soviet Union, the possibility of a Warsaw Pact invasion disappeared, and by 1995 many positions were abandoned by the military.

Fortress Saint-Maurice encompasses the area around Saint-Maurice in the western, French-speaking portion of Switzerland. The Rhône river leaves the central Alpine region at Saint-Maurice through a narrow defile, between 4000m mountains to the south and 3000m mountains to the north. The only comparatively easy access to the upper Rhône valley, and thus to the western National Redoubt, is through Saint-Maurice. Fortress Saint-Maurice is a series of fortifications set into the mountains on either side of the valley, dominating the region as far as Lac Léman with their artillery. The principal fortification is the enormous Fort de Dailly, supported by forts Savartan, Scex and Cindey, as well as lesser positions. The extent of the area designated as Fortress Saint-Maurice is not clearly defined, but according to the Association Fort de Litroz, the Saint-Maurice sector comprises the Rhône narrows from just north of Saint-Maurice to Martigny, excluding Chillon and Champillon, as well as the fortifications of the lateral valleys.

== Concept and organization ==
Fortress Saint-Maurice is not a single, connected fortified position, but rather a series of mutually supporting self-sufficient fortifications that dominate 10 kilometres (6.2 mi) of the Rhône valley between Saint-Maurice and Martigny. The Rhône in this area runs through a deep valley with the classic U-shaped glacial profile. These steep cliff walls, framing a flat valley floor averaging about 1,500 metres (4,900 ft) wide, create a natural gauntlet. The individual forts are mined as galleries running in the valley walls overlooking the valley and each other. The higher-level forts are accessed by aerial cableways or by inclined funiculars mined within the mountains. Fortress Saint-Maurice bars an enemy moving from France into the central Alps, and to a lesser extent, prevents an enemy crossing the Great Saint Bernard Pass or the Simplon Pass from moving against Lausanne. The Saint-Maurice fortifications were supported by additional positions in advance of the main strongpoint, with major forts at Chillon and Champillon, as well as additional fortifications in side valleys and lesser thoroughfares.

While the Saint-Maurice area has been fortified since medieval times, work on the National Redoubt began in the 1880s with Forts Dailly, Savatan and Scex. World War II and the prospect of invasion by Germany and possibly Italy gave new impetus to the fortification program, causing existing fortifications to be updated and new fortifications to be constructed. In particular, Fort de Dailly became one of the largest and most heavily armed fortifications in Switzerland.

Virtually every constriction, bridge, tunnel or other defensible position in the valley was fortified with blockhouses, anti-tank barriers, permanent minefields or pre-surveyed artillery coverage. Industrial facilities, such as the Vezey hydroelectric plant, incorporated fortifications into their construction. All construction was carefully camouflaged using light shells to simulate rock formations, or with a house-shaped superstructure.

The fortifications were maintained and progressively upgraded through the close of the Cold War. By 1995, many were deactivated. The Saint-Maurice fortifications are considered potential historic monuments and have remained in relatively good repair.

== Principal fortifications ==
The Saint-Maurice fortifications are disposed in mutually supporting groups, often with pairs of forts that provide mutual support by direct fire as well as supporting more distant parts of the ensemble by means of indirect fire. From north to south, the principal components are as follows:

=== North of Saint-Maurice ===
Fort de Toveyeres is an infantry fort built to cover the eastern end of the Lavey anti-tank barrier. The barrier, made up of dragon's teeth and a deep ditch, spans the Rhône valley north of Saint-Maurice. The Courset stream runs in the ditch. The tailwater stream from the Lavey hydroelectric station affords an additional barrier, while the power station is itself fortified, with covering fire from the Fort de Cindey.

Fort du Petit-Mont is just to the north of Toveyres, providing more cover to the Lavey barrier.

=== Galerie du Scex and Cindey ===
The Scex and Cindey fortifications are built into the dramatic Scex escarpment overlooking Saint-Maurice. These two forts, opposite the earlier Savatan and Dailly forts, completed the major portion of the Fortress Saint-Maurice ensemble in the early 20th century. Scex is primarily an artillery fort, which Cindey is a mixed artillery and infantry position. The forts, together with the Grotte aux Fées natural cave, are open to public tours.

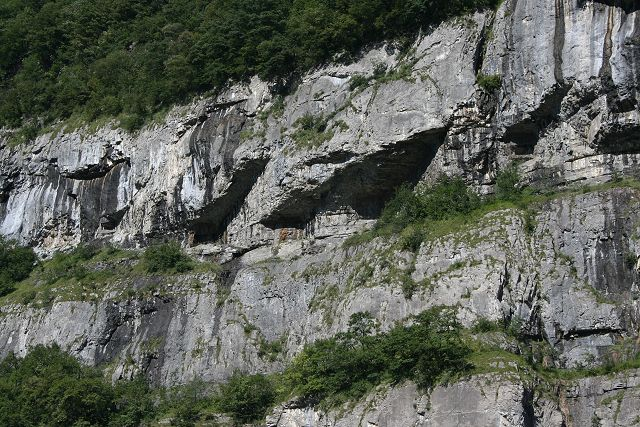
Batterie Ermitage, Fort du Scex

Fort du Scex (A166) 46°12′50.03″N 6°59′45.62″E comprises part of a fortress complex encased in rock high above the strategic Saint Maurice valley. Scex is connected to Cindey by the natural caves of the Grotte aux Fées. The fort was planned to provide supporting fire to the larger and earlier forts Savatan and Dailly on the right bank of the Rhône. The Galerie du Scex was initially armed with four 75 mm guns in 1911. From 1915 it was expanded. The connection to the Grotte aux Fées was built in 1935-36. The Ermitage battery of four 75 mm guns was constructed in 1938-39, with further improvements to habitation during and after World War II. The artillery was deactivated in 1984, when the position was converted to use as a command post. By 1995 the fort was entirely deactivated. Routine access to the fort for supplies was provided by an aerial cableway.

Fort de Cindey (A155) 46°13′14.67″N 7°00′12.44″E was built between 1941 and 1946 and expanded between 1948 and 1952. Located in rock galleries in a northern continuation of the Scex cliff, the fort controlled the narrow defile of the Rhône river. The fort was initially armed with two 105 mm guns, with four 90 mm anti-tank guns and three machine guns added in the 1950s, part of the program begun at Dailly. The fort served until 1995, when it was taken out of service. Power and communications were supplied by Fort de Scex. Supplies were provided by an aerial ropeway similar to that of Scex.

=== Savatan-Dailly ===
The forts at Savatan and Dailly were completed in 1894 and became the central elements of Fortress Saint-Maurice. They were progressively expanded and upgraded through the twentieth century.

Fort de Dailly (A250) 46°12′24.91″N 7°01′43.31″E is one of the largest and most heavily armed forts in Switzerland, and the central position in Fortress Saint-Maurice. The artillery fort is located on the end of the Dailly massif at a higher level than Savatan. Work began at Dailly in 1892. The entrance to the underground fort lies at 1,400 metres (4,600 ft) at the end of 29 switchbacks. The fort initially was armed with six 120 mm gun turrets with additional open artillery positions. Two 75 mm guns were mounted in casemates, while portable 53 mm gun turrets occupied prepared surface positions. Dailly was upgraded with 105 mm artillery during the 1940s, with as many as ten 105 mm guns in casemate positions.

Dailly was the scene of an ammunition explosion on 28 May 1946, when about 5500 105 mm shells, amounting to 449 tons, exploded in three separate magazines successively. The blast threw four 105 mm guns from their emplacements and damaged six more. Six construction workers were killed, part of a crew working on a funicular shaft linking Dailly to the upper part of Savatan. Two similar explosions happened at Grisons in June 1946 and at Blausee-Mitholz in 1947. The damage to Dailly resulted in a comprehensive modernization of the fort, with additions of 81 mm and 120 mm mortars, removal of obsolete weapons and the installation of two modern 150 mm gun turrets. An underground caserne for 650 men was built at this time, with NBC protection. The four 105 mm guns of the northern casemates and the two 105 mm guns of the central casemate were repaired and upgraded, but the four guns of the south battery were never replaced. The new 150 mm gun turrets were mounted on barbettes50 metres (160 ft) deep, with an individual rate of fire of 22 rounds per minute in bursts, or 15 rounds per minute sustained. Design began in 1949, with the first test firings in 1960.

Dailly was deactivated in 1995 and decommissioned in 2003. With the other Saint-Maurice fortifications, it has been designated as a candidate for preservation. From the beginning of April 2014, guided tours will be organized during the week for groups of a minimum of 10 persons

Fort de Savatan (A200) 46°12′40.77″N 7°01′15.33″E occupies a shelf on the northwest side of the Dailly massif on the eastern side of the Rhône valley, overlooking Saint-Maurice to the northwest. With up to 1600 troops, the artillery fort mounted five turrets for 120 mm guns, a number of 53 mm gun turrets and four 84 mm guns in caponiers for close defense. Savatan was upgraded at the same time as Dailly, adding an NBC-protected 350-man underground caserne.

=== South of Saint-Maurice ===
Fort d'Evionnaz (A80) 46°10′25.63″N 7°01′17.14″E is an infantry fort in rock-cut galleries, designed to support the anti-tank line between Evionnaz and Collognes. The position was garrisoned by an infantry company and extends over four levels. The fort flanks the west side of the "dragon's teeth" anti-tank line that spans the flat floor of the valley. As constructed in 1939, Evionnaz was armed with 47 mm anti-tank guns and machine guns. These were upgraded in the 1970s to 90 mm guns and improved machine guns. The anti-tank line was planned principally to block an advance from the south toward Lac Léman, rather than the other way around, as most of the area's fortifications were planned.

=== Martigny area ===
Fort Follatères (A66) 46°07′31.22″N 7°04′02.30″E is located near Martigny on the north side of the Rhône, and a point where the river bend at a right angle and joins the Drance. Follatères was armed with four 75 mm guns covering Martigny and two 105 mm guns aimed in the direction of the Great Saint Bernard Pass.

Fort de Vernayaz (A68/69) complements Follatères on the south side of the Rhône at Vernayaz. The fort occupies a unique location at the mouth of the Trient Gorges overlooking the rail line and Verayaz. The fort is accessed by walkways on the cliffside above the torrent, with footbridges connecting tunnel portals over the water. Materials were delivered by a ropeway. There are three levels of galleries, which are no longer military property. Plans are underway to open the complex to visits by the public.

== Present status ==
Many of the Saint-Maurice fortifications have been deactivated and are considered potential historic monuments. The Forts de Scex and Cindey are open for tours, and plans are being developed to open the Fort de Vernayaz to the public.
