= Fort de Cindey =

Former fortress in Switzerland

- Part of Fortress Saint-Maurice
- Western Switzerland
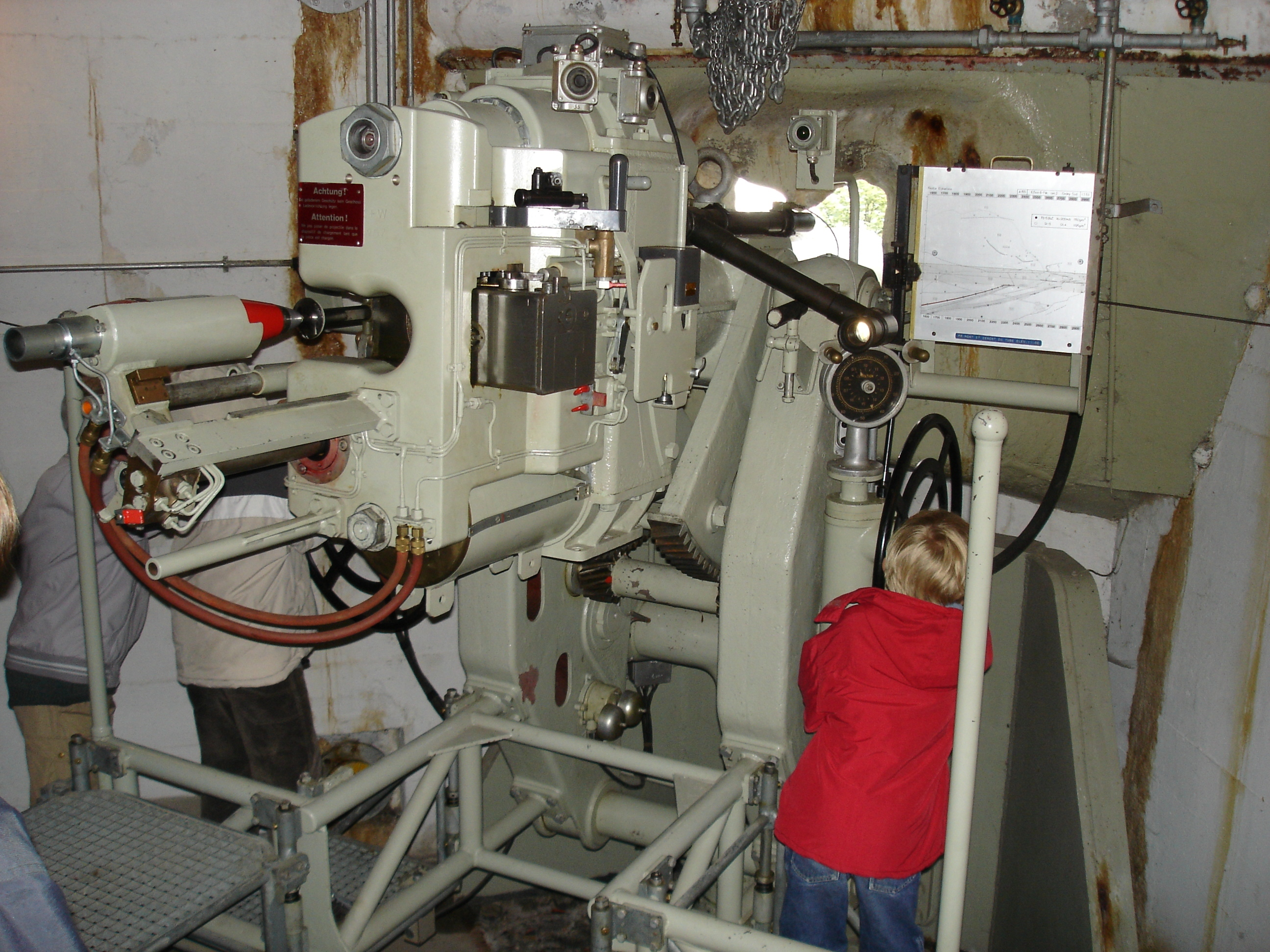
- Rear of a 105mm gun at the Fort de Cindey

Site information
- Controlled by: Switzerland
- Open to the public: Yes
- Condition: Preserved

Location
- Coordinates: 46.22074°N 7.00346°E

Site history
- Built: 1941-46 and 1948-1952
- Materials: Rock excavation

The Fort de Cindey (Swiss designation A155) is a component of Fortress Saint-Maurice, which is in turn one of the three principal fortified regions of the National Redoubt of Switzerland. The Fort de Cindey was built in two steps: the first, between 1941 and 1946 and the second step, between 1948 and 1954 (the hospital, the artilleries casemates with the gunnery command and the ammunition magazines) . It was taken out of service in 1995. This fort was built in the Scex cliff face immediately to the west of Saint-Maurice to complement the existing Fort du Scex, built earlier in the same cliff. With the Fort du Scex, it comprises a fortress complex encased in rock high above the strategic Saint-Maurice valley. The fort was deactivated in 1995. It is now open for public tours during the summer months.

== Site ==
The Fort de Cindey is located in the western cliffs of the Saint-Maurice valley where the defile narrows dramatically. The location was previously fortified in the 19th century. The Château Saint-Maurice remains extant, while extensive fortifications on either side of the Rhône, constructed between 1831 and 1860 by General Guillaume Henri Dufour have disappeared.

== Description ==
The Fort de Cindey is arranged along a mined gallery paralleling the face of the Scex escarpment at a distance from the rock face of about 25 metres (82 ft), with side galleries extending to the cliff face for observation posts and artillery positions. Lateral branches to the interior of the mountain lead to troop accommodations, the command post, ammunition magazines and utility areas. The fort was planned as a mixed artillery and infantry position that could provide supporting fire to the anti-tank barrier across the Rhône valley at Lavey.

Cindey is connected to the adjoining Fort du Scex by the natural caves of the Grotte aux Fées. The Fort de Cindey was initially armed with two 105 mm guns in individual casemates. Four 90 mm anti-tank guns and three machine guns were added in the 1950s. The fort was also equipped with four mobile 81 mm mortars. Ammunition magazines and an infirmary were added at this time. Routine access to the fort for supplies was provided by an aerial cableway. The fort's power and communications were provided by the Fort du Scex, which had had its guns deactivated and was used as a command post until 1995.

The fort continued in service until 1995, when it was deactivated. All of the guns remain in place.

== Present status ==
The fort is available for public tours in summer months, together with the Fort du Scex and the Grotte aux Fées.
