= Fort du Scex =

Military museum in Switzerland

- Part of Fortress Saint-Maurice
- Western Switzerland
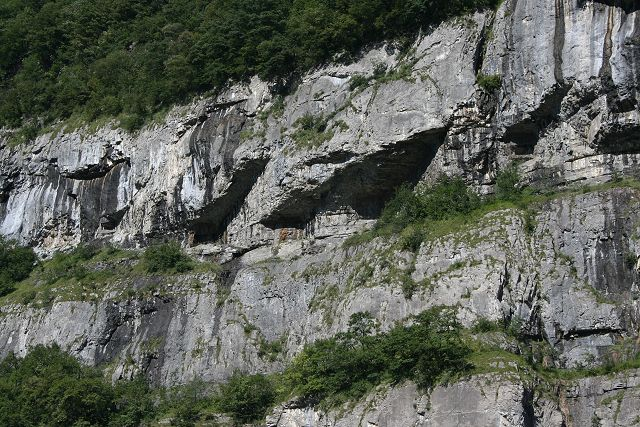
- Batterie Ermitage casemates in the cliff face

Site information
- Controlled by: Switzerland
- Open to the public: Yes
- Condition: Preserved
- Website: forteresse-historique.ch

Location
- Coordinates: 46.2139°N 6.99601°E

Site history
- Built: 1911, 1930s
- Materials: Rock excavation

The Fort du Scex is a component of Fortress Saint-Maurice, which is in turn one of the three principal fortified regions of the National Redoubt of Switzerland. The Fort du Scex was built in the Scex cliff face immediately to the west of Saint-Maurice beginning in 1911. With the later Fort de Cindey, it comprises a fortress complex encased in rock high above the strategic Saint-Maurice valley. The fort lost its combat function in 1984 and was entirely deactivated in 1995. It is now open for public tours during the summer months.

== Description ==
The Fort du Scex is arranged along a mined gallery paralleling the face of the Scex escarpment at a distance from the rock face of about 10 metres (33 ft), with side galleries extending to the cliff face for observation posts and artillery positions. Lateral branches to the interior of the mountain lead to troop accommodations, the command post, ammunition magazines and utility areas. Primarily an artillery position, the fort was planned to provide supporting fire to the larger and earlier forts Savatan and Dailly on the right bank of the Rhône.

Scex is connected to the adjoining Fort de Cindey by a cut tunnel, 800m long which leads to the natural caves of the Grotte aux Fées. The Galerie du Scex was initially armed with four 75mm1903/18 L30 Krupp-Giovanola guns in 1911. These guns were placed in double casemate positions, and had a range of about 11 kilometres (6.8 mi), aimed due east, with a firing rate of 12 to 15 rounds per minute. The fort was also equipped with four machine gun positions, disposed in a projecting bay or caponier with two guns sweeping the cliff face in each direction. From 1915 the fort was expanded. The connection to the Grotte aux Fées was built in 1935-36. The Ermitage battery of four 75mm 1903/22 L30 guns in individual casemates was constructed in 1938-39, with further improvements to habitation during and after World War II. A parallel gallery was built during this time, about 25 metres (82 ft) from the cliff face.

The artillery was deactivated in 1984, when the position was converted to use as a command post. All of the 75mm pieces were removed, although one was reconstructed in 2001 for display. By 1995 the fort was entirely deactivated. Routine access to the fort for supplies was provided by an aerial camouflaged cableway, built in 1922.

== Influence ==
The Fort du Scex was the first example of a flanking battery built into a rock face in Switzerland. Scex was the prototype for similar emplacements in the Ticino canton and elsewhere in Switzerland.

== Present status ==
The fort is available for public tours in summer months, together with the Fort de Cindey and the Grotte aux Fées.
