= Michael Daley (disambiguation) =

Michael Daley is an Australian politician

Michael Daley may also refer to:

- Michael Daley (boxer) (1865–1910), American boxer
- Michael P. Daley, American author and cultural historian
- Michael Daley, director of ArtWatch UK, the UK branch of ArtWatch International
- Michael Daley Award

== See also ==
- Michael Daly (disambiguation)
