= National Redoubt (Switzerland) =

Defensive plan developed by the Swiss government

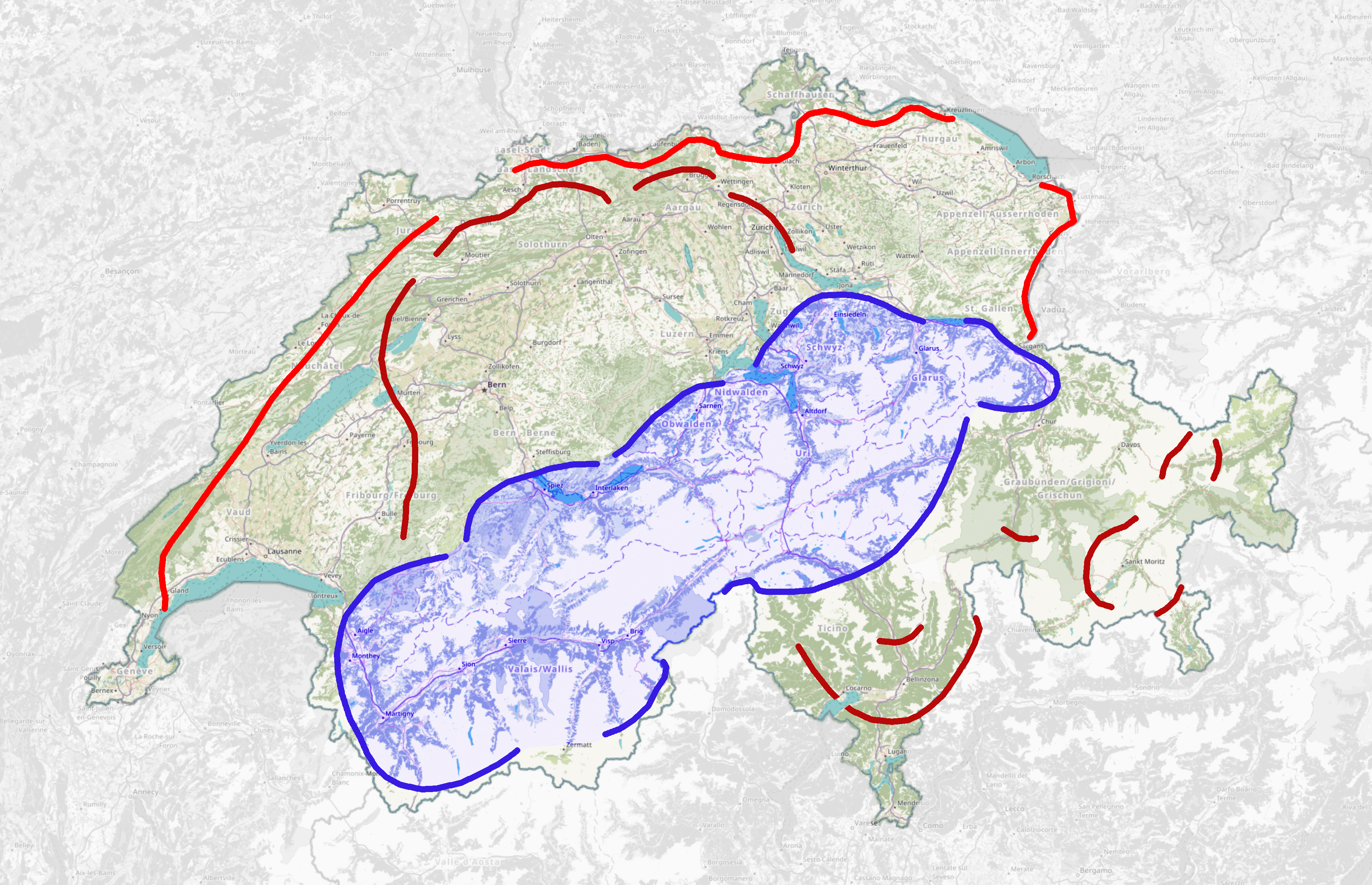
Plan of the defence lines of the National Redoubt

The Swiss National Redoubt (German: Schweizer Reduit; French: Réduit national; Italian: Ridotto nazionale; Romansh: Reduit nazional) is a defensive plan developed by the Swiss government beginning in the 1880s to respond to foreign invasion. In the opening years of the Second World War the plan was expanded and refined to deal with a potential German invasion. The term "National Redoubt" primarily refers to the fortifications begun in the 1880s that secured the mountainous central part of Switzerland, providing a defended refuge for a retreating Swiss Army.

The National Redoubt encompassed a widely distributed set of fortifications on a general east–west line through the Alps, centering around the major fortress complexes of St. Maurice, St. Gotthard, and Sargans. These fortresses primarily defended the alpine crossings between Germany and Italy and were outside the industrialized and populated regions of Switzerland. These regions were defended by the "Border Line", and the "Army Position" somewhat farther back. While not intended as an impassable barrier, these lines contained significant fortifications, but the National Redoubt was planned as a nearly impregnable complex of fortifications that would deny an aggressor passage over or through the Alps by controlling the major mountain passes and railway tunnels running north-to-south through the region. This defensive line was intended to slow, or deter altogether, an invasion by denying Switzerland's crucial transportation infrastructure to an aggressor.

The plan did not intend to protect the majority of the Swiss population – only few would have found refuge and supplies in the alpine area of the Redoubt – and it also did not lend any protection to the industrial centres of Switzerland, which are located in the Swiss lowlands, the Swiss Plateau. Given that the German armed forces had shown little reluctance in subjecting the civilian population elsewhere to deportations, forced labor or even massacre, Axis invaders could have forced the Swiss government to a quick surrender.

The Swiss strategy assumed that the Axis powers would not have an alternative to the heavily defended alpine passes of Switzerland. Because of possible reprisals against Swiss civilians, British Field Marshal Montgomery judged the National Redoubt to be an “impractical absurdity”.

The National Redoubt has been the subject of debate in Swiss society, with many fortifications decommissioned by the early 21st century.

== Swiss Alps ==
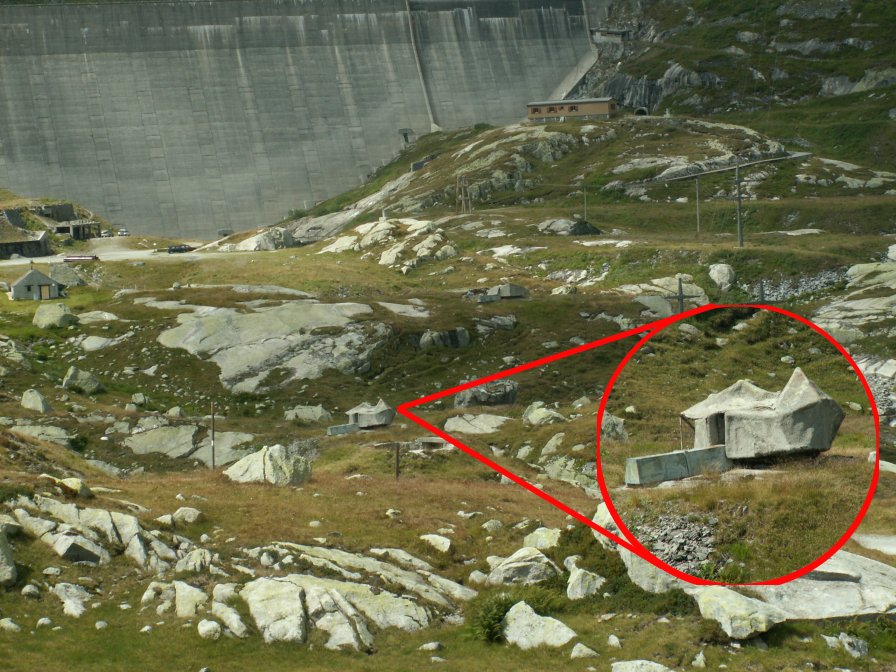
Camouflaged cannon beside the Lago di Lucendro. It has a 105 mm calibre and fires up to range of 17 kilometres (11 mi).

The concept of "réduit" is a recurring theme in Swiss defence theory. Having stayed neutral during World War II, Switzerland retained the concept for its plans of resistance against a potential Soviet invasion during the Cold War, when it became a strong influence on the Swiss concept of neutrality.

=== History ===
Fortification of the Swiss alpine region began in the 1880s, shortly after the opening of the Gotthard railway. Forts similar to those of Belgian military engineer Henri Alexis Brialmont were built at Airolo, the Oberalp Pass, Furka Pass, and Grimsel Pass, all in the Central Alps. Additional positions were constructed in the area of Saint-Maurice, using mining and tunneling techniques in the steep mountainsides of the glacial valley.

In the immediate aftermath of World War I, there was little Swiss interest in further fortifications. However, during the 1930s, as France built the Maginot Line from the Swiss border to the Belgian border and Czechoslovakia built the Czechoslovak border fortifications, Switzerland re-examined its fixed defenses. At the same time, job creation programs became desirable as a result of the worldwide Great Depression. Design work began in 1935, and in 1937 construction began on the expanded Alpine fortifications, the Border Line, and the Army line fortifications.

==== Guisan plan ====
General Henri Guisan developed a strategy for the defence of Switzerland that recognised its limited resources in equipment and manpower compared to its potential adversaries. Guisan proposed a delaying strategy in the broken terrain of the borders to keep an invading force out of the open country in the central plateau for as long as possible to allow an orderly retreat to the secured Alpine perimeter. Once the retreat to the Alps was complete, the Swiss government could remain in hiding for an extended time. Accordingly, border fortifications were improved, with major programs along the Rhine and at Vallorbe in the Jura. The strategic Alpine nodes of Saint-Maurice, Saint Gotthard, and Sargans were identified as the primary points of access to the Alpine redoubt for a potential aggressor. While Saint Gotthard and Saint-Maurice had been previously fortified, the area of Sargans was newly vulnerable because of a drainage program of former wetlands along the Rhine that would now provide easy access to the eastern Alpine gateway at Sargans.

=== World War II ===
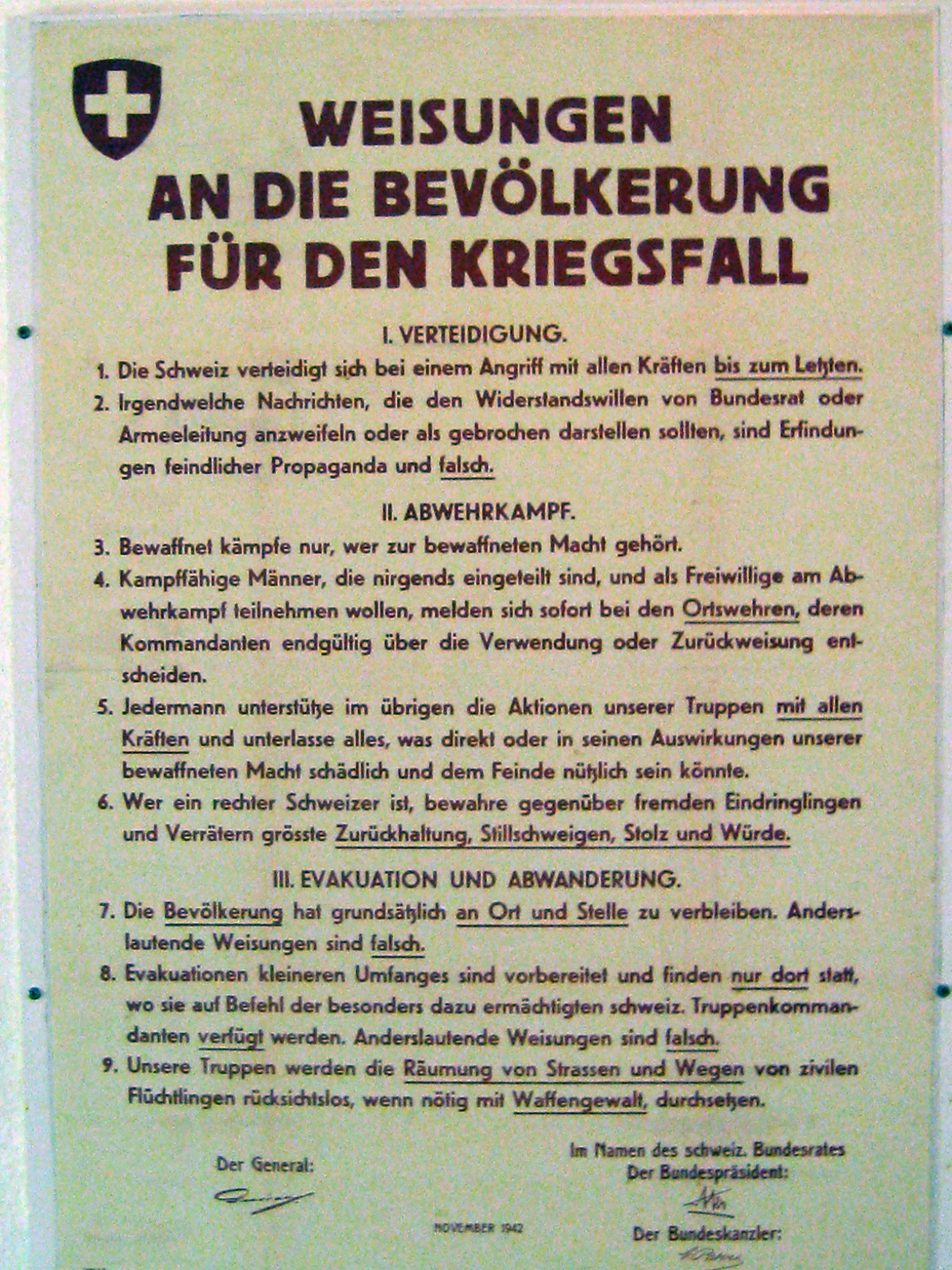
Instructions to the Swiss population in case of war. Point 7 tells people to stay where they live. 8: Only minor evacuations would ever take place. 9: Announces the use of deadly force if any refugees clog roads and paths – presumably those leading to the alpine redoubt.

Debate continued over the extent of the redoubt under the Guisan Plan. A proposal was developed by officers from German-speaking cantons, advocating a more compact redoubt. That was overcome by a proposal, authored by Guisan's chief of staff, Colonel Samuel Gonard, whose plan ratified the Saint-Maurice - Saint Gotthard - Sargans strategy, prefaced by a defence in depth. Additional impetus was provided by the fall of France in June 1940. Two days after the French surrender, on 23 June, the border zones were reduced in priority in favor of the "advanced position" or Army Line. The army was shifted to the center of the country, leaving industries and population centres relatively unprotected. The final Guisan Plan, adopted on 12 July 1940, defined an organised retreat to the Alps in which supplies would be stocked for an indefinite resistance with no thought of further retreat. On 25 July 1940, the Swiss defensive plan was disseminated dictating a fallback to the Alps in the event of an Axis attack, focusing in particular on the Gotthard massif and destroying all access points as necessary once inside.

The Redoubt strategy was emphasized on 24 May 1941. Until then, only about two thirds of the Swiss Army had been mobilized. After the swift overrunning of the Balkan countries by the Germans in April 1941, in which relatively-low mountains had proven to be little barrier to the mobile German forces, the entire Swiss army was mobilised. The Swiss, lacking a significant armored force, drew the conclusion that withdrawal to the redoubt was the only sound course. Any actions in the Central Plateau would be delaying actions only. The plan was revealed to the public after Switzerland was surrounded by German and Italian forces, with the so-called Rütli Report, a historic and highly-symbolic meeting of the Swiss Army staff and the entire officer corps at the founding site of the Swiss confederation. In case of attack, the Swiss would defend only the High Alps, including the important transalpine roads and rail links. As a last resort, the army would make the routes useless to the Axis by destroying key bridges and tunnels. The plan meant that the populated lowlands, including the economic centres of the country, would be effectively ceded to the Germans. The gold reserves of the Swiss National Bank in Zürich were moved farther away from the German border to the Gotthard Pass and Bern.

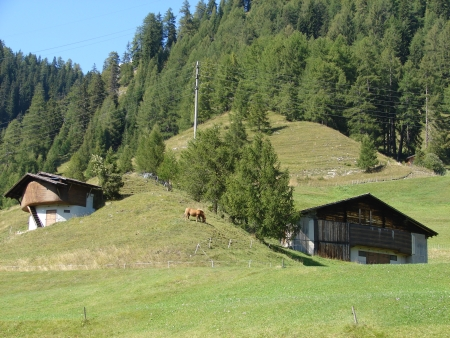
Camouflaged infantry fortification in Sufers (machine gun bastion left, antitank gun right, housing, and connecting tunnel)

The National Redoubt assumed great importance to the Swiss in 1940, when they were entirely surrounded by Axis powers and thus effectively at the mercy of Hitler and Mussolini. The National Redoubt was a way to preserve at least part of Swiss territory in the event of an invasion. The redoubt was to be manned by eight infantry divisions and three mountain brigades; the Swiss practiced for war by imitating the battles occurring around them. Switzerland's redoubt strategy during World War II was essentially one of deterrence. The idea was to make clear to Germany that an invasion would have a high cost. Simultaneously, economic concessions were made to Germany in the hope that the overall cost of a German invasion would be perceived to be higher than the potential benefits. However, it is clear that Hitler intended to invade eventually and that the Allied landing at Normandy and the difficulties faced in invading the Soviet Union were pivotal in merely delaying an invasion. Concessions included a national blackout and the destruction of a secret German radar system that had accidentally landed in Switzerland in exchange for a dozen aircraft.

In its invasion plan, Operation Tannenbaum, Germany planned to capture Geneva and Lucerne, and Italy would capture the Alps; both countries would then divide Switzerland.

=== Cold War ===
Swiss policy during the Cold War adopted a more aggressive defence of the borders that relied less on a retreat to the mountains. While Switzerland was again surrounded by an alliance, NATO was not considered a threat to Swiss independence; the Warsaw Pact alliance however was considered a threat. The Swiss strategy sought to exact a high price from any direct ground attack on Swiss territory. Control of the Alpine crossings remained a cornerstone of the Swiss strategy of neutrality. The dense network of passive and active barriers and large and small fortifications allowed considerable flexibility in the disposition of Swiss forces and represented an almost-optimal scenario of defence in depth.

The strategic importance of the Alpine crossings had only increased since the Second World War, and any incursion by Warsaw Pact forces would require them to be taken or for terms for their use to be agreed upon to the satisfaction of Switzerland.

In 1953, Swiss policy was formalized to place greater emphasis on the defence of the borders and population centers and to extend the concept of defence in depth, pioneered in the redoubt, to the entire Swiss territory. That corresponded to an unspoken reliance on co-operation with NATO to secure the flanks of Swiss territory and to resupply Swiss forces, which already purchased equipment from members of NATO. The redoubt, with its determinedly-neutralist connotations, lost priority.

Many billions of francs have been invested in building the fortifications in the mountains, which are partly still used by the army. The most important buildings of the redoubt were the fortifications of Sargans, St. Maurice, and the Gotthard region. At the time, caverns in these areas were equipped with essential military infrastructure. Besides cannons and howitzers, the infrastructure consisted of dormitories, kitchens, field hospitals, rooms for the sick, bakeries, and enough space to accommodate 100 to 600 soldiers for up to several months. Because tensions between the West and the Soviet Union, which later fell, cooled down and bunkers became increasingly obsolete because of newer weapon systems, many of the buildings were closed after the Cold War, in the mid-to-late 1990s and the early 2000s. Some of them have been reopened as museums and can be visited.

The construction of enough civilian nuclear fallout shelters for the entire population was mandated in 1978. New apartment buildings were required to have them on site; others paid for the construction of shelters in common buildings or transport tunnels.

== Comparison with contemporary projects ==
The National Redoubt fortifications, when compared to contemporary French, Belgian, German, or Czech fortifications, were much more extensive and heavily armed than the Maginot Line, the Belgian border fortifications, the Siegfried Line, or the Czechoslovak border fortifications. While the Maginot fortifications were typically armed with short-barreled 75 mm fortress howitzers or 120 mm mortar/howitzers, the Swiss fortifications were armed with 75 mm and 120 mm guns, upgraded in the 1950s to 105mm and 150 mm guns. The Swiss guns were typically casemate-mounted or turret-mounted long guns, not howitzers, and were more akin to naval guns than fortress guns. Because they were typically mounted on inaccessible cliffs or plateaus with an advantage of enfilade over any possible opposing force, they were not exposed to infantry attack or direct artillery fire and could afford to have exposed gun barrels. The French positions, which could be targeted by anti-tank weapons or infantry, avoided any exposed gun tubes.

== Fortress St. Gotthard ==
=== Airolo positions ===
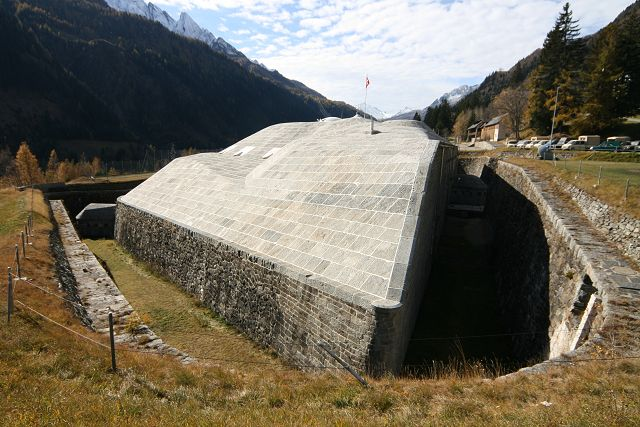
Fort Airolo

Fort Airolo 46°31′42.19″N 8°35′21.25″E, also known as Forte di Airolo, was built between 1887 and 1890 at the southern end of the Gotthard Pass overlooking Airolo. The fort was a compact massif similar to a Brialmont fort, with an encircling ditch defended by caponiers and provided with a twin 120 mm gun turret and four 53 mm gun turrets for close defence, with five 84 mm guns in casemates. A 1 kilometre (0.62 mi) tunnel links Fort Airolo to the Gotthard Rail Tunnel. Abandoned by the military in 1947, the fort is maintained as a museum by a preservation group and may be visited.

Battery Motto Bartola 46°32′01.15″N 8°35′17.15″E is located just up the hill from Fort Airolo and mounted an additional four 120 mm guns. The fort, built between 1888 and 1890, also mounted four 84 mm guns, with extensive underground galleries linking the firing positions.

Battery Foppa Grande mounted one 105 mm gun in a camouflaged turret above Motto Bartola, with three 20 mm anti-aircraft guns. The position featured a mortar battery, installed in 1953. The position was deactivated in 1997 and classified as potentially historical. The position may be visited by prior arrangement.

Fort San Carlo is an artillery fort.

Fort Stuei

Saint Gotthard Tunnel South Portal monitored the original south entrance to the Gotthard Rail Tunnel. Portions of the original installation remain, but the tunnel entrance has been extended to the south and the historic portal no longer exists. These positions were built in 1886-87 and represent the first modern fortifications in Switzerland. A gallery (a long horizontal tunnel) links the main tunnel positions back to Fort Airolo.

=== St. Gotthard Pass positions ===
Redoubt Hospiz 46°33′24.20″N 8°34′06.37″E, also known as Forte Ospizio, was built in 1894 and operated until 1947 near the summit of the Gotthard Pass. The fort mounted two single 120 mm gun turrets. The fort is now operated as a museum and may be visited by the public.

Fort Sasso da Pigna 46°33′31.68″N 8°33′59.50″E was built during the early part of World War II, becoming operational in 1943, effectively replacing Redoubt Hospiz. The fort consists of an eastern battery overlooking the Leventina valley and a western battery overlooking the Bedretto valley and the main pass. The main entrance is located just to the north of Fort Ospizio, with 2,400 metres (7,900 ft) of galleries and four 105 mm gun positions. A proposed addition of two more guns in the late 1950s never proceeded. The position was used until 1999. It opened to the public as a museum on 25 August 2012.

Infantry positions: A number of small infantry bunkers exist near the top of the pass, most notably Bunker No. 3. Construction took place in three stages: 1886–87, 1892–1920, and 1946–1973. These works exhibit a high quality of workmanship and integration into the landscape.

=== Urseren Valley North ===
Fort Bühl 46°38′35.45″N 8°35′24.97″E

Fortin Altkirch 46°38′37″N 8°35′30″E

Fort Bäzberg 46°38′40″N 8°34′38″E

=== Oberalp Pass ===
Fort Stöckli 46°39′28.99″N 8°37′17.21″E

Oberalp infantry positions

Fort Gütsch 46°39′17″N 8°36′53″E

=== Furka Pass ===
Fort Galenhütten 46°34′38.24″N 8°23′27.61″E

Fort Fuchsegg

== Fortress St. Maurice ==
Fortress Saint-Maurice encompasses the area around Saint-Maurice in the western, French-speaking portion of Switzerland. The Rhône leaves the central Alpine region through a narrow defile, between 4,000 metres (13,000 ft) mountains to the south and 3,000 metres (9,800 ft) mountains to the north. The only comparatively easy access to the upper Rhône valley, and thus to the western National Redoubt, is through Saint-Maurice. Fortress Saint-Maurice is a series of fortifications set into the mountains on either side of the valley, dominating the region as far as Lake Geneva with their artillery. The principal fortification is the enormous Fort de Dailly, supported by forts Savatan, Fort du Scex, and Fort de Cindey, as well as lesser positions. The extent of the area designated as Fortress Saint-Maurice is not clearly defined, but according to the Association Fort de Litroz, the Saint-Maurice sector comprises the Rhône narrows from just north of Saint-Maurice to Martigny, excluding Chillon and Champillon, as well as the fortifications of the lateral valleys. However, the effective control of the Saint-Maurice positions extended from Lac Léman to the Great Saint Bernard Pass.

== Fortress Sargans ==
Fortress Sargans comprises six major fortifications centered on the town of Sargans in St. Gallen canton.

=== First Rhine Barrier Forts ===
Fort Schollberg

Fort Anstein

=== Major Forts ===
Fort Magletsch is as of 2012 still in use by the Swiss military. Shut down in 2017

Fort Castels is as of 2012 still in use by the Swiss military. Shut down in 2017

Fort Furggels

Fort Passatiwand

=== Southern Forts ===
Fort Molinära

Fort Haselboden

=== Second Rhine Barrier Forts ===
Fort Tschingel

Fort Nusslock

Fort Tamina Ragaz

(Sources:)

== Modernization ==
The Redoubt positions and others in Switzerland were augmented by the Bison project, which involved the installation of anti-tank guns in new bunkers at key locations to provide a modernized pre-positioned force capable of defeating modern armor. A project to install automatic 120 mm mortars was completed in 2003.

=== Army strength reductions ===
In 1995, the Swiss army was reduced from 750,000 troops to 400,000. By 2004, army strength was 120,000, with 80,000 proposed by 2020.

=== Fate ===
Debate continues over the usefulness of the Redoubt and other Swiss fortifications. In October 2010, Defense Minister Ueli Maurer proposed closing many of the positions after mitigating environmental issues and assuring permanent safety. A decommissioning program was expected to cost as much as a billion francs. In 2011, Maurer estimated costs to close down the system safely at more than $1 billion. Some of the facilities have been leased or sold as digital data repositories.

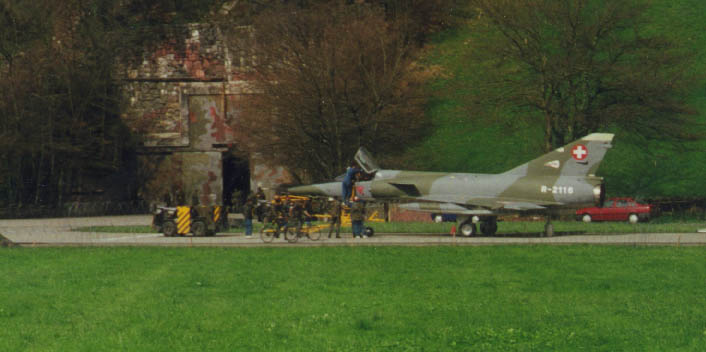
A Mirage IIIRS in front of the aircraft cavern Y in Buochs

Because the Réduit strategy was essentially one of deterrence, part of it was overt and public, and played a part in the so-called "intellectual defence of the homeland", or Geistige Landesverteidigung attempting to improve the morale and cohesiveness of the Swiss nation. The Réduit strategy's use as a deterrence/propaganda tool continued through the cold war. In 1964, the army's pavilion at the Swiss Fair (Landesausstellung) in Lausanne had the shape of a giant Czech hedgehog made of concrete.

The Réduit features at the center of Swiss writer Christian Kracht's 2008 dystopian novel Ich werde hier sein im Sonnenschein und im Schatten.

Nation-wide removal of Cold War-era demolition explosives on hundreds or thousands of bridges and other structures such as the Holzbrücke Bad Säckingen covered bridge was completed by December 2014.

Civilian transitions have resulted in a diverse array of repurposed former military facilities. Niche enterprises now occupying decommissioned sites include hospitality and leisure providers, food producers and cultural initiatives, as well as cyber-security and asset-protection specialists.

=== Leisure and tourism ===
The refashioning of fortified sites added a new dimension to Alpine adventure travel in the Gotthard region. More than 2,000 metres above sea level, the old San Carlo fortress was transformed into a unique subterranean luxury hotel and conference center in 2004. Nearby, the cavernous Sasso da Pigna complex was converted into a museum and multimedia theme park in 2012.

=== Culture ===
Converted into a museum in 2001, the former Faulensee artillery plant in the Bernese Oberland offers visitors the opportunity to explore a typical camouflaged underground bunker complex with connecting tunnels.

Opened in 2019, the Andermatt Concert Hall project transformed an underground military space initially earmarked for events and conventions into an international music venue.

=== Organic foods ===
Resourceful horticulturalists and food producers have also exploited the warm, humid microclimate of the old Gotthard tunnels. Former ammunition tunnels at Erstfeld, Stansstade and Oberdorf now offer ideal conditions in which to cultivate crops of premium mushrooms.

Likewise, traditional cheese makers Seiler Kaserei invested 6 million francs in 2021 to adapt the old Giswilerstock military tunnel, thus creating a new warehouse environment designed for specialty cave-aged cheeses.

=== Security ===
Several Réduit bunkers originally built to guarantee national security now provide the ultimate safe haven for safeguarding some of the commercial world’s most valuable commodities. Underground data centers in the Bernese Oberland and the canton of Lucerne archive and protect multinational digital real estate from every conceivable hazard.

In the Gotthard region, a dedicated suite of maximum-security bunkers were constructed during the Second World War at a secret location near Amsteg in the canton of Uri. This 3,000-square-metre complex was built to provide a refuge for Switzerland's wartime cabinet. Today, however, these Gotthard vaults are maintained by specialist providers offering protected storage of precious metals and other valuable assets.

=== Strategic reappraisal ===
In 2023, with some contemporary observers already predicting “Switzerland’s security will continue to become increasingly dependent on external inputs”, debate about the relevance of the remaining Redoubt fortifications has once again come to the fore. The resurgence of geopolitical power politics, especially the Russo-Ukrainian war, has also served to focus attention on whether the current Swiss strategy of armed neutrality will, in future years, deliver independence or isolation.

In military terms, a 2023 Swiss Army review (Die Verteidigungsfähigkeit stärken: Zielbild und Strategie für den Aufwuchs) has acknowledged that modern hybrid warfare with its rapidly evolving technologies will demand a broader future defense strategy to counter a variety of possible threats. On September 18, 2023, Lieutenant General Süssli announced that Switzerland will halt the sale of bunkers. The army will now seek to maximize its capability by reintegrating such fortifications into the existing military infrastructure.

=== Continuing environmental remediation and public safety ===
Despite the extensive munitions-clearance program, some Cold War-era hazards remain. The plight of the villagers of Mitholz in the canton of Bern illustrates the nature of such residual problems: On December 19, 1947, a wartime munitions dump exploded, killing nine people and destroying the heart of the village. A Federal Department of Defense (DDPS) report in 2018 confirmed the remaining 3,500 tons of explosive material must be removed to avoid the risk of a further tragedy – a task requiring the temporary evacuation of Mitholz residents. The estimated cost in 2020 was put at 900 million francs. Yet by September 2023, when the Swiss parliament agreed to finance the 25 years of work involved, clearance costs had risen to almost 2.6 billion francs. With the first evacuations scheduled for the summer of 2024, a DDPS disaster risk management plan has nominated the Center for Development and Environment (CDE) at the University of Bern to continuously monitor the social impact of the remediation across the lifespan of the project.

== See also ==
- Seven Days to the River Rhine
- Operation Tannenbaum
- Alpine Fortress
