= Mike Dailly (lawyer) =

Scottish lawyer

- Education: University of Strathclyde
- Occupation: Solicitor

Mike Dailly is a prominent Scottish lawyer. Dailly is Principal Solicitor and Solicitor Advocate at Glasgow's Govan Law Centre and Govanhill Law Centre - free UK community legal resources.

He has campaigned on a wide range of United Kingdom social justice and access to justice issues, including unfair UK bank charges, the prevention of homelessness, debt law, public law and democracy issues.

He was a member of the Financial Services Authority's statutory advisory body, the Financial Services Consumer Panel, a member of the Board of the Scottish Housing Regulator and a member of the European Banking Authority's Banking Stakeholder Group.

Govan Law Centre is part of the law centre movement.
