= Fort de Dailly =

Fortification in Switzerland

- Part of Fortress Saint-Maurice
- Western Switzerland
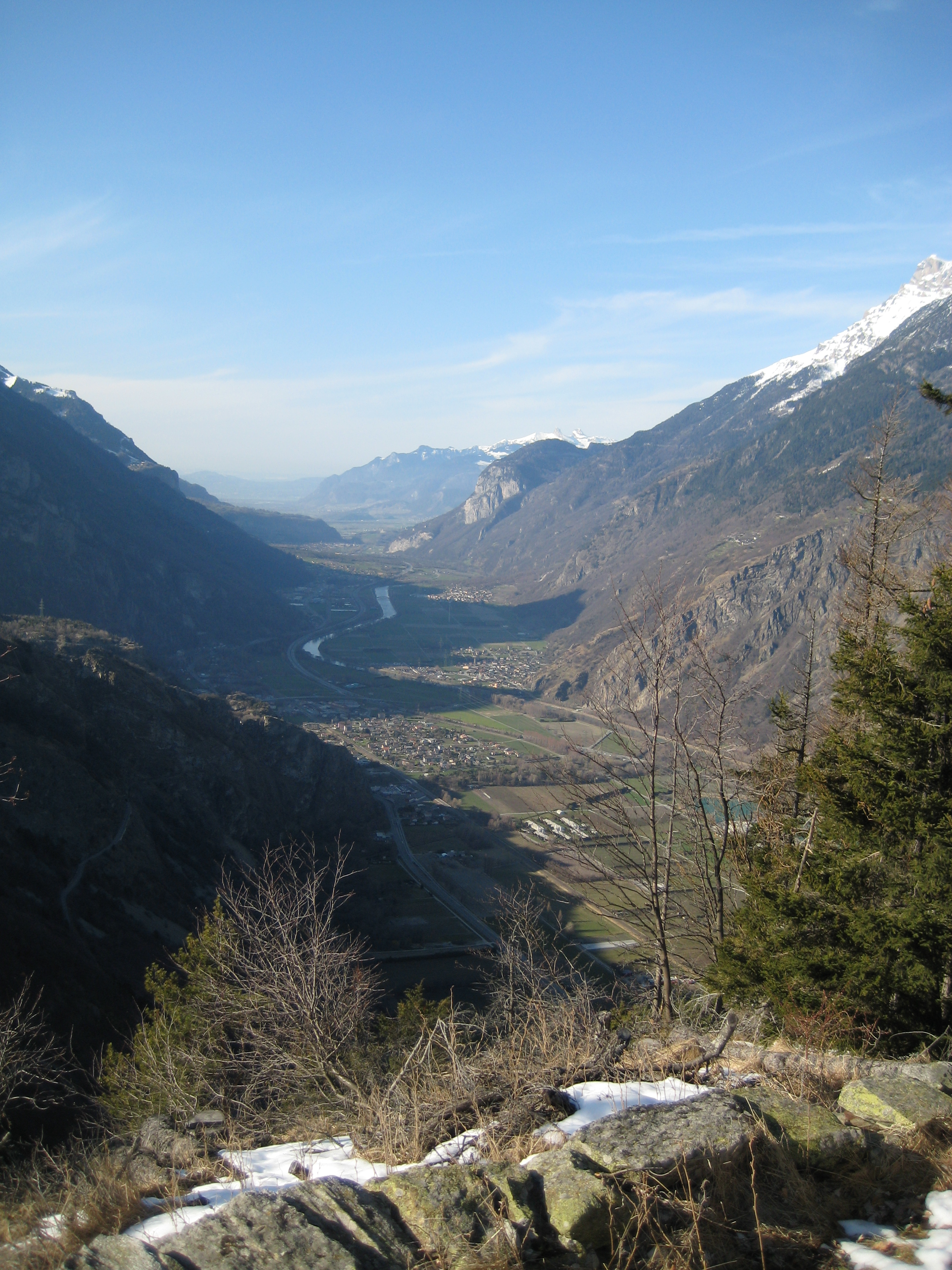
- The Rhône valley with the Fort de Dailly on the heights to the right

Site information
- Controlled by: Switzerland
- Open to the public: From April 2014

Location
- Location within Switzerland
- Coordinates: 46.20692°N 7.0287°E

Site history
- Built: 1892, expanded through the 1960s
- In use: Not in use
- Materials: Rock excavation

Garrison information
- Occupants: Brigade de Forteresse 10

The Fort de Dailly is the largest component of Fortress Saint-Maurice, which is in turn one of the three principal fortified regions of the National Redoubt of Switzerland. Almost entirely subterranean, the Fort de Dailly was built in the Massif de Dailly to the east of Saint-Maurice beginning in 1892. With the Fort de Savatan, it comprises a fortress complex encased in rock high above the strategic Saint-Maurice valley, capable of commanding the valley from Chillon to Martigny. It is the central component of Fortress Saint-Maurice in terms of both its position and its military power. Construction began in 1892 and the fort became operational in 1894. The fort was nearly constantly upgraded with new artillery in increasingly secure positions. Following an incident in which three ammunition magazines exploded in close succession in 1946, the fort was repaired and upgraded with two fully automatic 150 mm gun turrets with a range of 24 kilometres (15 mi). After reassessments by the Swiss Armed Forces of their requirements for fixed fortifications, Dailly was progressively closed down starting in 1995, with full closure at the end of 2003.

== Fortress complex ==
The Fort de Dailly is the largest part of a fortress complex extending the length of the Saint-Maurice valley, with coordinated fields of artillery fire and interlocking defenses. While most of these positions are detached from one another and are self-sufficient installations, Dailly and its neighbor Savatan are connected. The Fort de Savatan adjoins Dailly at a lower level, facing to the north, and is connected by an inclined funicular in the mountain. The forts at Dailly and Savatan were completed in 1894 and became the central elements of Fortress Saint-Maurice. They were progressively expanded and upgraded through the twentieth century. Over time, Dailly was equipped with an example of virtually every Swiss artillery piece and construction method, from rock-cut artillery galleries to revolving gun turrets.

The Fort de Dailly and surrounding installations were manned through their modern history by Fortress Brigade 10. Dailly and Savatan comprised Fortress Group 2, under Fortress Regiment 19 of Fortress Brigade 10.

== Description ==
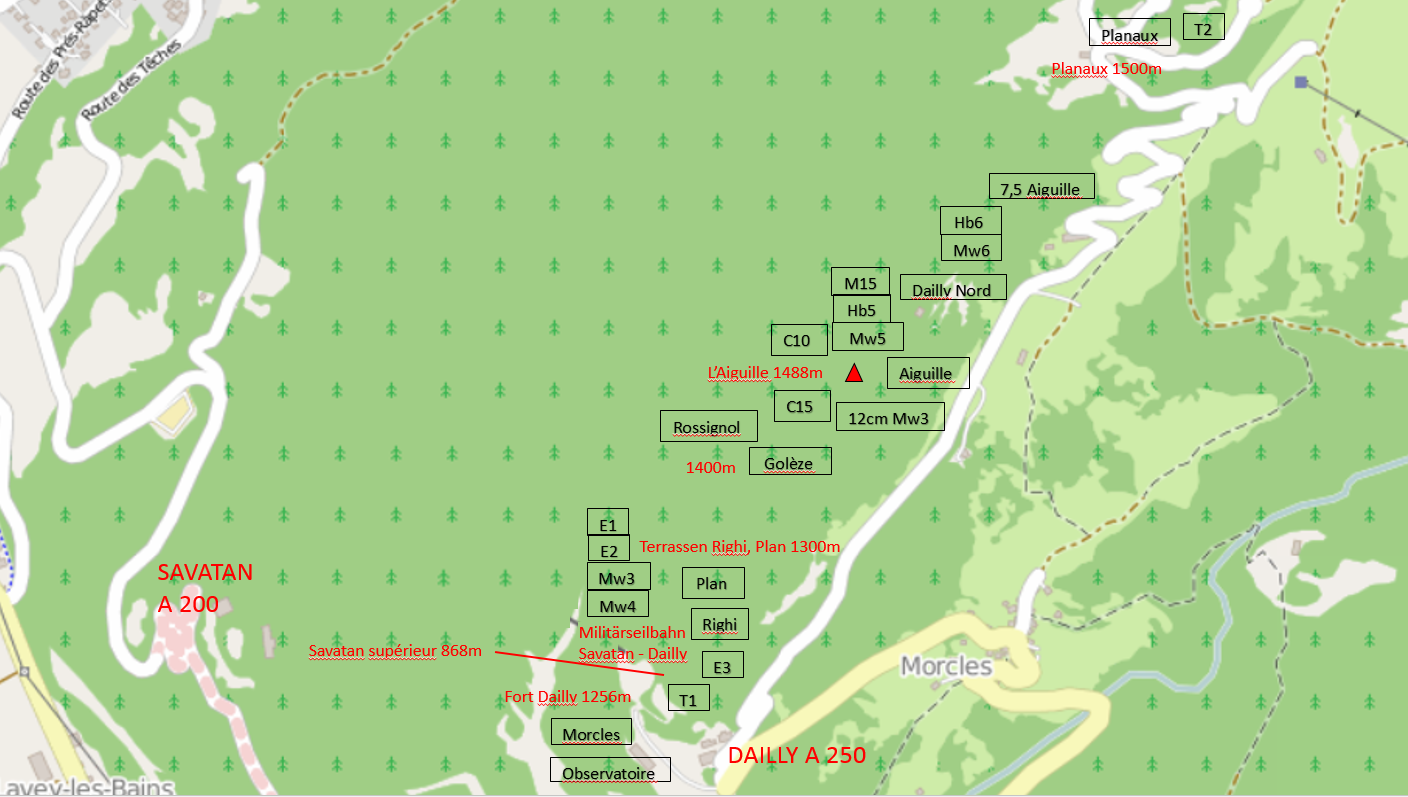
Principal emplacements of Fort de Dailly

Fort de Dailly is one of the largest and most heavily armed forts in Switzerland, and the central position in Fortress Saint-Maurice. The artillery fort is located on the end of the Dailly massif at a higher level than Savatan, with fields of fire to the north, west and south. The fort therefore is capable of firing on an enemy advancing southeast into the heart of the Alpine redoubt from the direction of Lac Léman, or northwest from the Great Saint Bernard or Simplon passes. Work began at Dailly in 1892. The entrance to the underground fort lies at an elevation of 1,400 metres (4,600 ft) at the end of 29 switchbacks. The fort initially was armed with six 120 mm gun turrets with additional open artillery positions, including six additional 120 mm guns on rail-mobile disappearing mounts. Two 75 mm guns were mounted in casemates, while portable 53 mm gun turrets occupied prepared surface positions. Dailly was upgraded with 105 mm artillery during the 1940s, with as many as ten 105 mm guns in casemate positions. Flanking coverage from across the valley was provided by the Fort du Scex.

The construction of Dailly and other fortifications at Saint-Maurice raised concerns in France at the turn of the twentieth century. The Saint-Maurice defenses were first reconnoitered in December 1896 by a French Colonel Raymond, followed by Lieutenant Vignon in July, 1898.. French citizens working on the fortification projects were interviewed by the French gendarmerie. In 1901 the French military attaché in Bern obtained pictures of Dailly from a Swiss officer.

== Construction ==
Initial studies were carried out for a fortification at Savatan in 1890. It became clear that a position in the higher Dailly massif to the south would protect forces on the Savatan plateau and would complement a battery on the opposite side of the valley at Scex. A small hotel on the site of an old weather observation station on the Dailly massif was chosen for the barracks. Robert Weber was the architect in charge of the works. Initial work installed two 150 mm mortars on Dailly at an altitude of about 3,000 metres (9,800 ft), which remained in place until the 1920s. A single 120 mm howitzer in an armored turret was installed on the summit, remaining in place through the 1940s. For local defense, two 84 mm guns were placed in concreted casemates near an observation point in 1894, called the Batterie de la Galerie de Morcles.

Heavier artillery was initially installed in open positions. 150 mm Krupp field guns were installed in open emplacements in 1894, allowing fire in two directions. Battery C15 was placed on the ridge between Righi and the Aiguille, firing north and south. Battery C10 with two 105 mm guns and the Batterie Aiguille with the same equipment were placed near the summit. The Batterie de l'Observatoire, located above the Galerie des Mordes, was equipped with four 120 mm guns. The Batterie Rossignol placed two 120 mm pieces each facing north and south, while the Batterie de Plan 2 and the Batterie de Righi each mounted two 120 mm pieces. These were replaced in 1923 by Model 1912 120 mm howitzers with a higher rate of fire.

As construction continued, rotating guns were installed to exploit the broad field of fire afforded by the heights. Four or six 120 mm guns on mobile were installed on tracks in the Righi area. The guns were stored in garages in the rock, and were in service until the 1930s, forming batteries E1, E2 and E3. Two or four mobile guns were converted to fixed positions, replacing the C10 battery. Fixed turret guns were installed in the 1930s. The Model 1939 105 mm gun was developed with an underground barbette, with the gun carriage in an armored turret and only the barrel exposed. Battery Panaux, with two turrets, was placed in service in 1940, remaining in service until 1994.

Lighter guns were installed for local defense. From 1907 the Batterie Aiguille at the east end of the Aiguille crest covered the direction of Javerne with 75 mm guns. Two more guns installed in an open position between Righi and the Aiguille in 1909 formed the Batterie Golèze, covering the area of Demècre. The exposed nature of this battery led to its replacement with a rock-protected position in the 1940s, remaining in service until all 75 mm guns were withdrawn in the 1980s.

Open heavy gun positions were judged to be relatively safe from opposing artillery fire, given their altitude above any potential opposing batteries, which would interfere with an optimal firing trajectory for an attacker. However, after the First World War, confidence in this approach lessened. The open positions were abandoned in the 1930s, replaced by artillery galleries under rock protection. At the Battery Rossignol, elevation 1,400 metres (4,600 ft), a gallery was excavated of sufficient size to allow towed artillery to be moved, with branching galleries on either side mounting Bofors 105 mm guns with a range of 18,000 metres (59,000 ft) in ten armored positions. Four guns, aimed to the north, constituted the Batteries des Buits. Four more, aimed to the south, were the Batterie de Plex, and two aimed to the east were the Batterie de Rosseline.

=== Ammunition explosion and renovation ===
Dailly was the scene of an ammunition explosion on 28 May 1946, when about 5500 105 mm shells, amounting to 449 tons, exploded in three separate magazines successively. The blast threw all four 105 mm guns of the Batterie de Plex from their emplacements and damaged six more. The 120 mm guns of the C10 battery were also damaged. Six construction workers were killed, part of a crew working on a funicular shaft linking Dailly to the upper part of Savatan. The explosion was attributed to decomposition of nitrocellulose propellant. Two similar explosions happened at Grisons in June 1946 and at Blausee-Mitholz in 1947, where 9 persons were killed in the village. The damage to Dailly resulted in a comprehensive modernization of the fort, with additions of 81 mm and 120 mm mortars, removal of obsolete weapons and the installation of two modern 150 mm gun turrets. An underground caserne for 650 men was built at this time, with NBC protection. The four 105 mm guns of the Batteries des Buits and the two 105 mm guns of the Batterie de Rosseline were repaired and upgraded, but the four guns of the south battery were never replaced, as their rock cover was judged to be insufficient.

The new 150 mm gun turrets were mounted on barbettes 50 metres (160 ft) deep, with an individual rate of fire of 22 rounds per minute in bursts, or 15 rounds per minute sustained. Design began in 1949, with the first test firings in 1960. The range of these new guns approached 24 kilometres (15 mi), sufficient to reach Montreux, Sion or the Chamonix valley in France. Battery T1 46°12′07.87″N 7°02′18.75″E (for "turret" or tourelle) was located at the old E3 mobile 120 mm battery at an elevation of 1,300 metres (4,300 ft). Battery T2 46°13′07.87″N 7°01′49.18″E was located at 1,500 feet (460 m) on the Rosseline heights near Battery Planaux. Both batteries were operational from 1962 to 1994.

Additional measures included the replacement of the summit batteries with two 81 mm fortress mortars, entirely buried in the mountain's peak. A battery of twinned 120 mm mortars was added in the 1960s. Both batteries remained in service until 1994. These batteries covered the entire Savatan massif. The abandoned Batterie de Plex was replaced by the Batterie Dailly Nord, which remained operational until the end of 2003.

== Deactivation and present status ==
Dailly was partially deactivated in 1995 and fully decommissioned at the end of 2003. With the other Saint-Maurice fortifications, it has been designated as a candidate for preservation.
