= Akaishi =

Akaishi (written: 赤石 lit "red stone") may refer to:

- Akaishi Mountains, mountain range in Honshū, Japan
  - Mount Akaishi
- Akaishi (surname)
