= Henri Guisan =

Swiss general

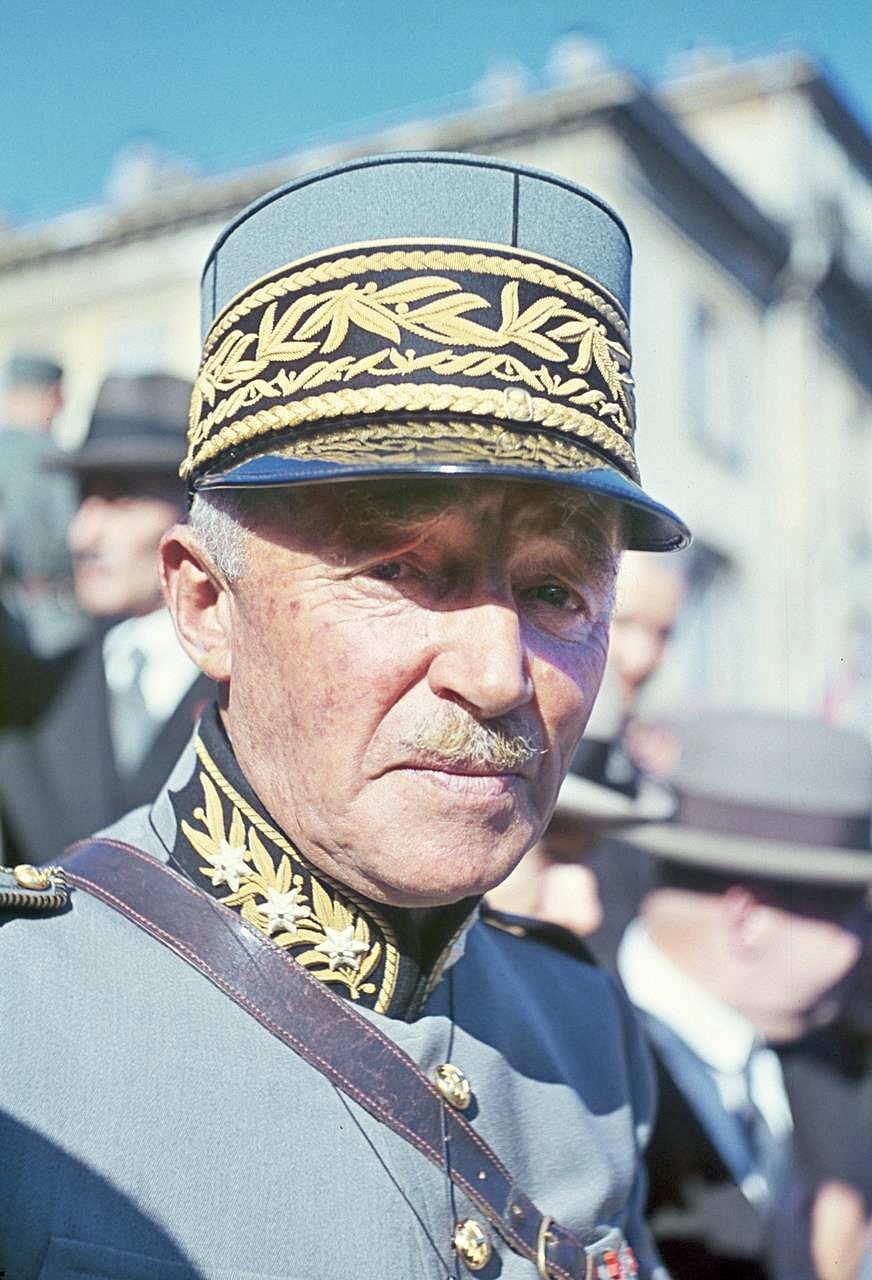
- Guisan in Visp, 1942
- Born: 21 October 1874; Mézières, Vaud, Switzerland
- Died: 7 April 1960 (aged 85); Pully, Vaud, Switzerland
- Military career
- Allegiance: Switzerland
- Service years: 1894–1945
- Rank: General
- Commands: Swiss Armed Forces

Henri Guisan (French pronunciation: [ɑ̃ʁi ɡizɑ̃]; 21 October 1874 – 7 April 1960) was a Swiss military officer who held the office of General of the Swiss Armed Forces during the Second World War. He was the fourth and the most recent person to be appointed to the rarely used Swiss rank of general, and was possibly Switzerland's most famous soldier. He is best remembered for effectively mobilizing the Swiss military and population in order to prepare resistance against a possible invasion by Nazi Germany in 1940. Guisan was voted the fourth-greatest Swiss figure of all time in 2010.

== Early life ==
Henri Guisan was born on 21 October 1874 in Mézières, in the canton of Vaud, a Protestant part of French-speaking Switzerland. He was the son of Louise-Jeanne (née Bérengier) and Charles Ernest Guisan, a doctor from Avenches. He attended school in Lausanne, graduating in 1893, and later studied at the agricultural schools of Écully, France, and Hohenheim, Germany. Upon completing his studies, in 1897, he moved to and became a gentleman farmer in the Broye Valley. That same year, Guisan married Mary Doelker, with whom he had two children, Henry and Myriam. In 1903 he moved to Verte-Rive in Pully, on Lake Geneva.

== Early military career ==
Upon entering the Swiss military in 1894, Guisan was assigned to the field artillery as a lieutenant. He was promoted to captain in 1904 and became captain of the General Staff in 1908. In 1911, Guisan was promoted to major and was transferred to the infantry on the order of the Chief of the General Staff, Theophil Sprecher von Bernegg. In 1916, he was made lieutenant-colonel of the General Staff in the "Operations" section in Bern, and in 1919 was simultaneously made chief of staff of the 2nd Division and commander of the 9th Infantry Regiment.

Guisan reached the ranks of brigadier in 1921, divisional commander in 1927, and was made corps commander in 1932, the highest Swiss rank achievable during peacetime. His appointment as corps commander was supported by Federal Councillor Rudolf Minger, head of the Federal Military Department. Guisan was first at the head of Field Army Corps 2 then of Field Army Corps 1.

== General ==
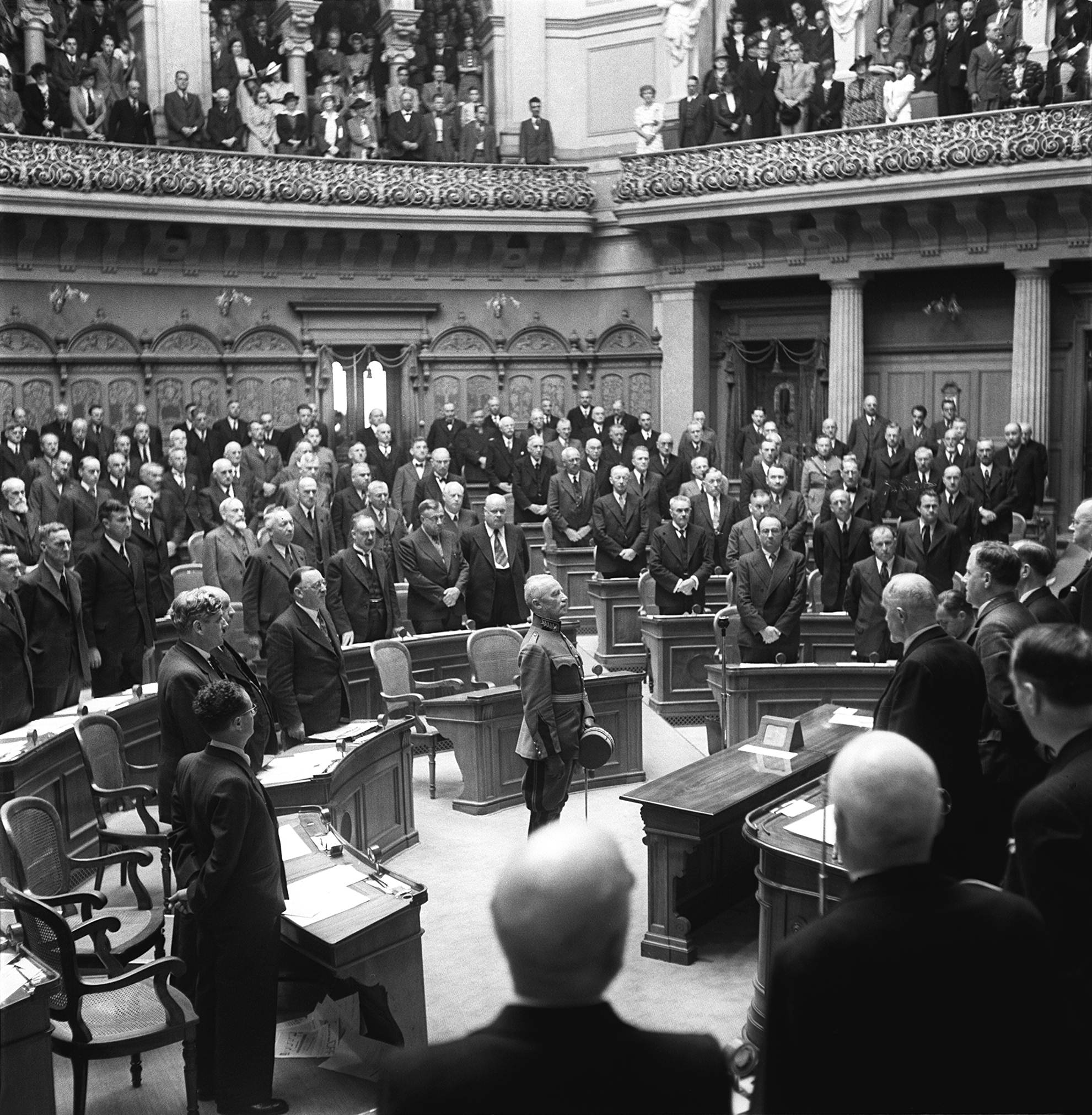
Henri Guisan being sworn in as general before the Federal Assembly, in the chamber of the National Council at the Federal Palace, in Bern, 30 August 1939

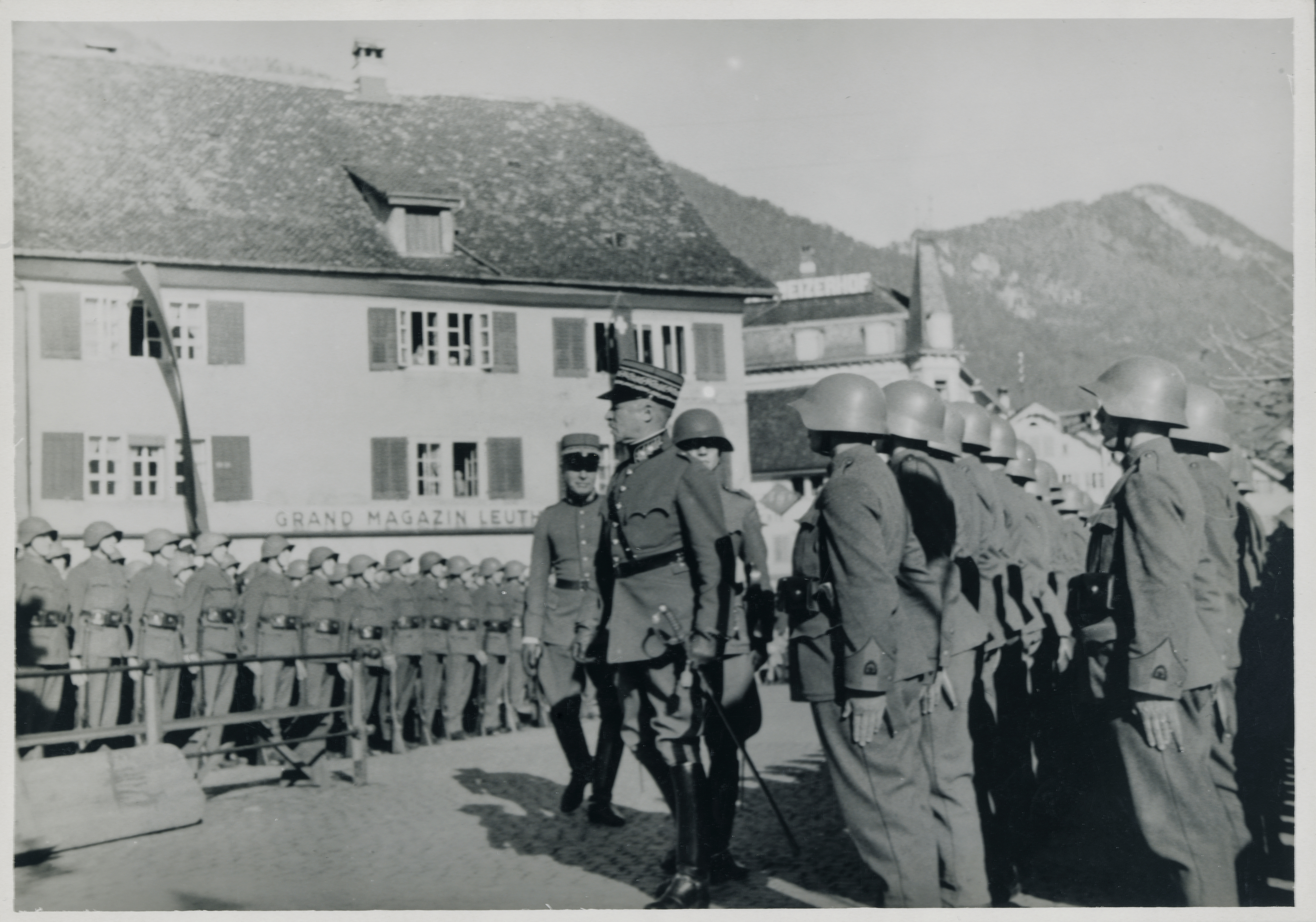
Guisan inspecting troops in Brunnen, Schwyz

On 28 August 1939, shortly before the outbreak of World War II, the Swiss Federal Assembly called a United Federal Assembly to elect a general, a unique rank used only in time of war or national emergency. On 30 August 1939, Guisan was elected general by 204 votes out of 231 members of the Assembly, against 21 votes for divisional commander Jules Borel, who was mostly supported by the socialists. He was given the directive to safeguard the independence of the country and to maintain the integrity of Swiss territory. During the Interwar period, Guisan had belonged to the conservative, federalist and anti-socialist political tendency, and was a member of the right-wing Swiss Patriotic Federation. Nevertheless, he maintained good relations with the Socialist Party for the entire duration of World War II.

In 1939 the Swiss military were able to muster 430,000 men, approximately 20% of the work force. At one point, up to 850,000 Swiss soldiers were mobilized. However, Swiss military equipment was not on a par with that of the German military. Guisan's command was dominated by conflict with the government. Whereas the government preferred an understated and politically riskless neutrality, Guisan, charged with actually preventing invasion, opted to call for determined resistance. In May 1940 he ordered an investigation against 124 army officers suspected of Nazi sympathies. After the Battle of France, Germany found documents in La Charité-sur-Loire proving that Guisan had been secretly making military preparations with France, despite Swiss neutrality. The Swiss military would have been remiss in not pursuing contacts with the French based on their perception of a German threat. Nonetheless, this was politically very risky, and represented a very typical example to be seized upon by Germany to justify aggression, such as occurred prior to the German invasion of the Netherlands in World War II.

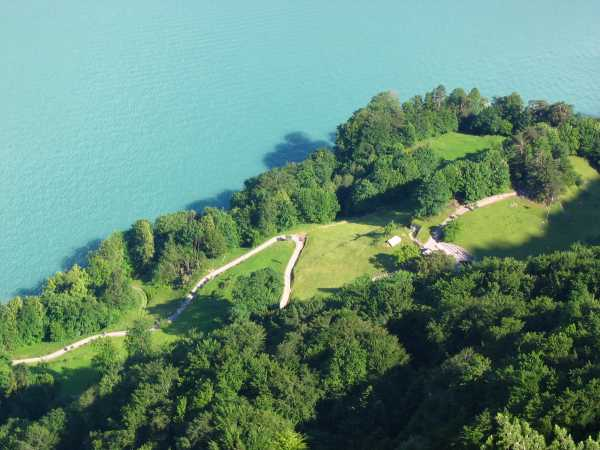
In 1940, Guisan delivered an address to the entire Swiss Officer Corps at this field in Rütli, calling for the Swiss to defend themselves to the death against invasion

On 25 July 1940, Guisan delivered a historic address to the entire Swiss Officer Corps assembled on the Rütli, a location charged with symbolism in Swiss Romantic nationalism by virtue of being identified as the site of the legendary Rütli Oath. He made it very clear that Switzerland would resist any Nazi invasion. If they ran out of bullets they were to resort to the bayonet. He said that Switzerland would defend itself against any invader and would never surrender. Guisan became a symbol of resistance to Nazism that was widespread amongst the Swiss public. At a time when military commanders remained distant, he rejected formalities and maintained contact with civilians and soldiers.

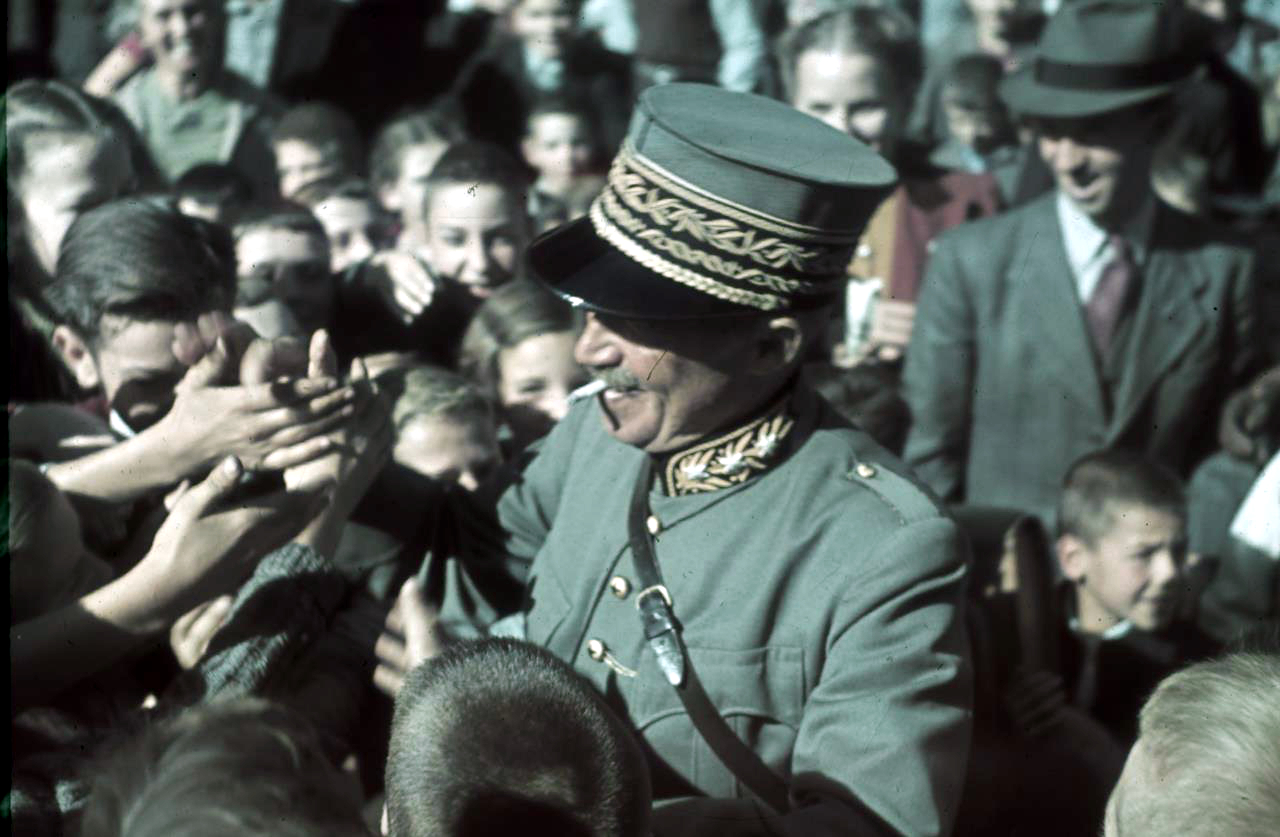
Guisan during a visit to Liestal, Basel-Landschaft

In summer 1940, after the Battle of France, Guisan developed his famous National Redoubt concept, according to which the Swiss Army would have retreated into the Alps relatively soon if attacked, but would have kept up resistance based on some sort of guerrilla and stay-behind tactics from there. The Swiss paramilitary organization Aktion Nationaler Widerstand (Resistant National Action), formed from contacts between selected army figures and conservative civilian circles, had the explicit task of persuading the civilian population to resist invaders.

However, Guisan's and Switzerland's main strategy was deterrence rather than fighting, and Germany never risked invasion. Its 1940 planned invasion of Switzerland, codenamed Operation Tannenbaum, was soon abandoned as the Battle of Britain and later Operation Barbarossa became priorities. On 20 August 1945, Guisan left his command, considering his mission to be fulfilled.

== Later life ==
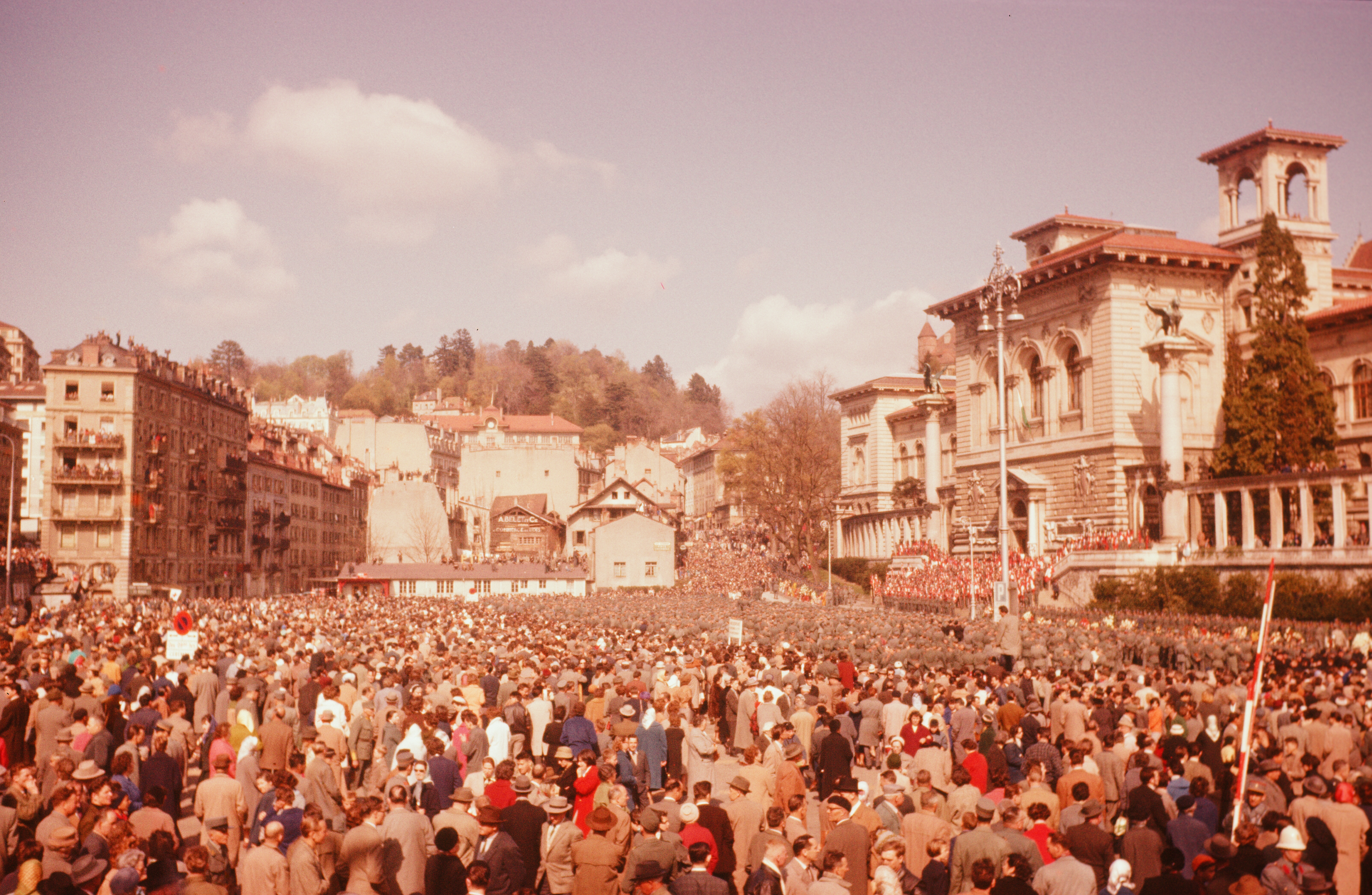
Crowds at Lausanne's Place de la Riponne during Guisan's funeral procession, 12 April 1960

Having become a national hero by successfully avoiding war, Guisan died in Pully on 7 April 1960, aged 85. He was buried on 12 April in Pully, with 300,000 participating in his funeral procession through Lausanne, the biggest attendance at a funeral in Swiss history. His grave is a work by Edouard-Marcel Sandoz.

== Public image ==
In his life, Guisan heavily propagandized his public image, banning 5,600 images of himself from being printed from 1939 to 1945. Unlike General Ulrich Wille during the First World War, Guisan was an extremely popular figure in Switzerland. He has been criticized for admiring Benito Mussolini and Philippe Pétain as well as having a meeting with Walter Schellenberg in March 1943.

== Memorials ==
Guisan's former home Verte Rive in Pully is now used as Centre Général Guisan. His office, living room and dining room are preserved as a museum.

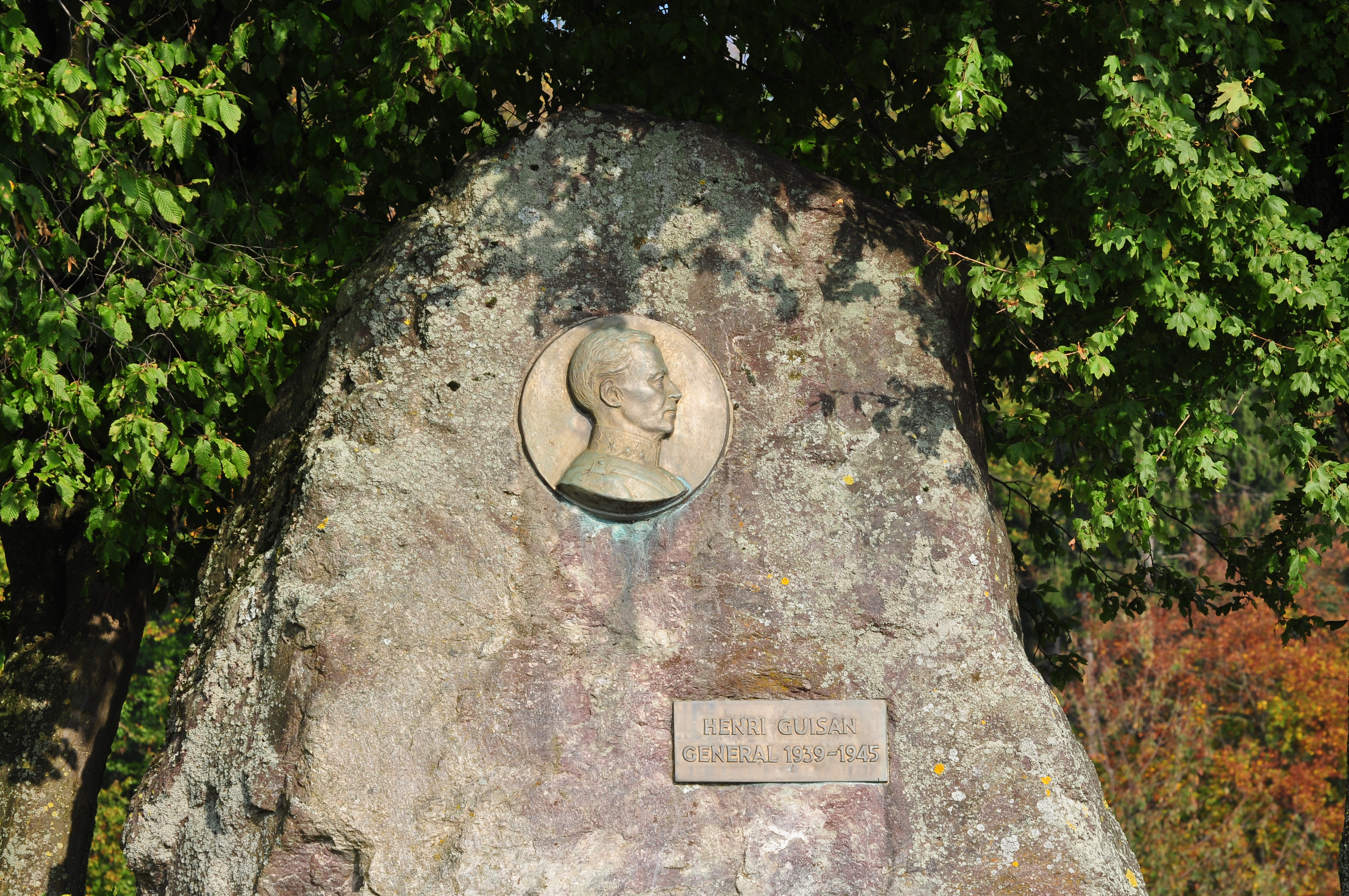
Memorial on Allmend, Zollikon

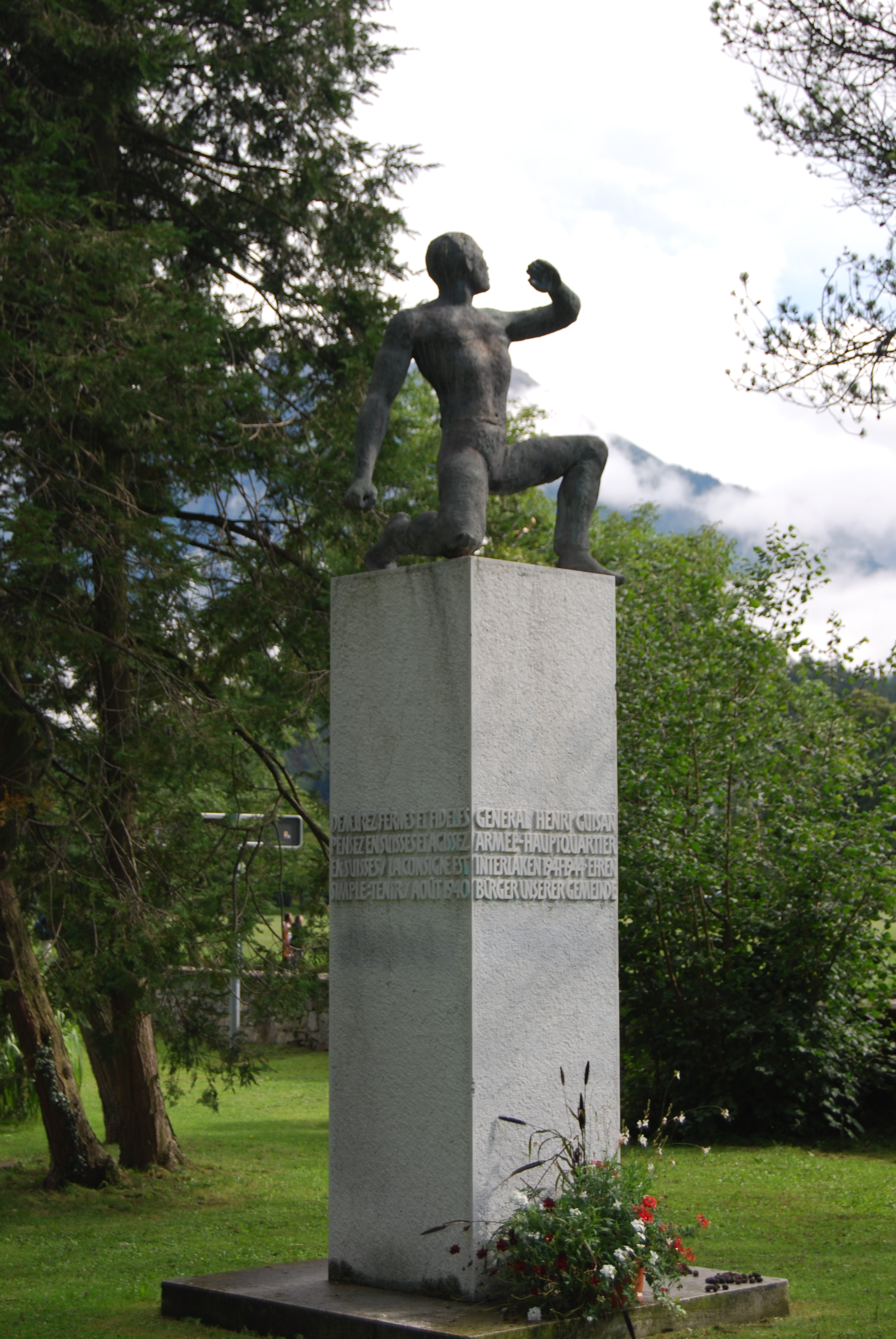
Memorial in Schlossgarten, Interlaken

Memorials are at:

- Lausanne-Ouchy: equestrian statue by Otto Bänninger, financed following a public fundraising in 1960, inaugurated on 27 May 1967 in the presence of 70,000 people
- Avenches: a bust, inaugurated in 1969
- On the main deck of the steamship Stadt Luzern: a memorial plaque with his relief by Franco Annoni commemorating his speech on Rütli in 1940, inaugurated by Georges-André Chevallaz in 1980, 40 years afterwards
- Library am Guisanplatz, Bern: equestrian sculpture by Laurent Boillat, created in 1949 and installed in September 2008
- Powązki Cemetery, Warsaw, Plaque: plaque inaugurated in 2010
- Schlossgarten, Interlaken: monumental sculpture
- Allmend, Zollikon: memorial with a relief
- Lägern above Regensberg: memorial plaque
- Dentenbergstrasse, Gümligen/Muri bei Bern: Memorial
- Victoria-Jungfrau, Interlaken: plaque in the hotel
- General-Guisan Quai, Lucerne: plaque on the lakeshore

Numerous cities and towns in Switzerland have streets named for him: General Guisan-Strasse in Aarau, Arlesheim, Basel, Forch, Nussbaumen, Obersiggenthal, Reinach, Seltisberg, Winterthur, Zofingen, Zug; General Guisanstrasse in Interlaken, Jegenstorf, Leuggern; Guisanstrasse in Burgdorf, St. Gallen, Weinfelden; avenue Général-Guisan in Avenches, Fribourg, Pully, Rolle, Sierre, Vevey, Yverdon-les-Bains; rue du Général Guisan in Courroux, Mézières, Montana; Promenade Général Guisan in Morges; General Guisan-Promenade in Basel; via Henri Guisan in Bellinzona; via Generale Guisan in Balerna, Biasca, Riva San Vitale, Vacallo, Lugano; via Generale Henri Guisan in Chiasso; via Guisan in Massagno, Paradiso; Via Enrico Guisan in Mendrisio.

Town squares and open spaces are named after him: Guisanplatz in Arosa, Berne, Grenchen and Thun; Guisanplatz/Place Guisan in Biel/Bienne; place Général-Guisan in Payerne and Pleigne; place du Général Henri-Guisan in Lausanne.

There is a quai du Général-Guisan on Lake Geneva in Geneva, General-Guisan-Quai on Lake Lucerne in Lucerne and Stansstad, on Lake Zurich in Zurich.

A military march titled "General-Guisan-Marsch" was composed in 1939 by Stephan Jaeggi.

Asteroid 1960 Guisan has been named in Guisan's honour.

The manga Alpen Rose by Michiyo Akaishi gives Guisan an important role in the story.

== Bibliography ==
- Bonjour, Edgar (1978). "Swiss Neutrality During Two World Wars". In Luck, James Murray; Burckhardt, Lukas F.; Haug, Hans (eds.). Modern Switzerland. The Society for the Promotion of Science and Scholarship Inc. pp. 419–438. ISBN 0-930664-01-9.
