= Amakusa 1637 =

Shōjo manga set during the Shimabara Rebellion

- Cover of Amakusa 1637 volume 1
- Genre: Action, Historical
- Manga
- Written by: Michiyo Akaishi
- Published by: Shogakukan
- Magazine: Petit Flower, Flowers
- Original run: May 26, 2000 – January 28, 2006
- Volumes: 12

Amakusa 1637 is a Japanese manga series written and illustrated by Michiyo Akaishi. It is about the time-traveling adventures of six modern-day Japanese high school students from the St. Francisco Academy to the 17th century, where they take part in the Shimabara Rebellion. It was serialized in the shōjo manga magazine Petit Flower from 2000 to 2002 and in the josei manga magazine Flowers from 2002 to 2006, and was collected in 12 tankōbon volumes.

== Story ==
The manga begins with the Great Hanshin earthquake of 1995, which the protagonists (a group of friends from the St. Francisco Academy from Kobe) barely survive. Years later, during a school field trip to Nagasaki, the teenagers are thrown back in time to the Japan of the early Edo period. According to history, in 1637 a revolt broke out, known as the Shimabara Rebellion. It was led by a charismatic youth known as Amakusa Shirō, but ended in the defeat of the rebels and the loss of over 37,000 lives.

Natsuki Hayami, the heroine, is mistaken as Amakusa Shirō by the villagers she met, despite the fact that the real Amakusa Shirō was male. In the story, the real Shirō died the year previously, before gaining recognition or popularity as a leader. However, Shirō was a very feminine-looking young man and the recently arrived Natsuki physically resembles him a lot, so the villagers think she is actually him. Before long, Natsuki becomes famous as some-sort of heaven-sent angel and people started calling her "Shirō", believing she was the saviour prophesied twenty-five years before; she commits herself to their cause in an attempt to avert the soon-to-come rebellion, and gathers her lost partners as well so they can help her.

== Characters ==
=== Main characters ===
Six students of the present-day St. Francisco Academy (circa 2000). They all are members of the Student Council.

Natsuki Hayumi (早弓 夏月, Hayumi Natsuki)
President of the student council president. She has fair skin, purple hair, and blue eyes; she looks so similar to Masuda Tokisada (Amakusa Shirō) that everybody in Tokisada's village believes she is an angel possessing his body to save the people. She is an expert kendō student and younger sister of the heir of Hakuou Dojo (白鷹道場, Hakuō Dōjō) (her father was the former master). She is romantically interested in Miyamoto Masaki. Natsuki arrived in the past in 1636.
Masaki Miyamoto (宮本 政希, Miyamoto Masaki)
The first vice-president of the Student Council. He is given the name "Musashi" by Otsū (the lover of the Musashi in historical novels). He becomes a master of kendō and a retainer of the Kokura-han's daimyō Ogasawara Tadazane. He arrived in the past around 1629–1630.
Naozumi Yatsuka (八塚 直純, Yatsuka Naozumi)
The second student council vice-president. He is a good kendō student. He has feelings for Natsuki, though she shows no interest in him. Naozumi arrived in the past around 1628–1629. He had an affair with the true Shirō but later killed him, therefore, he could be bisexual. He was Karatsu-han daimyō Terazawa Katataka's castellan in Tomioka Castle. His nickname is Kotaka (小鷹, "Little Falcon"). In reality, Tomioka Castle's castellan was Miyake Tōbei, the grandson of Akechi Mitsuhide.
Eri Kasugano (春日野 英理, Kasugano Eri)
One of the academy's brightest students, skilled in history and tactics. She uses much of her knowledge of historic tactics to help Natsuki win many battles. Eri harbors feelings for Natsuki. She travelled to the past at the same time as Natsuki. She serves as the strategist of the rebel forces.
Eiji Horie (堀江 栄司, Horie Eiji)
A genius of engineering. He creates many useful tools and weapons for the rebel forces. Eiji arrived in the past around 1632. He and Kichō (also known as Kiku), the concubine of the Shimabara-han daimyō Matsukura Katsuie are the first couple to get married among the group of friends.
Seika Akishima (安芸島 聖香, Akishima Seika)
A singer of the Academy. Arrived in the past at the same time as Eri and Natsuki. She was saved by the Dutch warship Heisenberg, which was under the command of Captain Jahn and Nicolaes Koekebakker, the Dutch governor. Her Christian name is Mariana.

=== Tokugawa's Rule ===
==== Edo ====
Tokugawa Iemitsu (徳川 家光)
The third Tokugawa shōgun, son of the second shogun Hidetada and grandson of the first shōgun Ieyasu.
Yagyū Jūbei (柳生 十兵衞)
Strategist and guard of Tokugawa Iemitsu. Renowned as an expert swordsman.

==== Ogi and Saga ====
Nabeshima Motoshige (鍋島 本茂)
Son of Nabeshima Katsushige. Daimyō of Ogi-han, a neighboring, branch domain of Saga-han.
Nabeshima Mitsushige (鍋島 光茂)
Young daimyō of Saga-han.
Nabeshima Katsushige (鍋島 勝茂)
Former daimyō of Saga-han. The son of Nabeshima Naoshige.

==== Karatsu ====
Terazawa Katataka (寺沢 堅高)
Daimyō of Karatsu-han, the child of Terazawa Hirotaka.
Sugishima Daigo
A fictional character. A retainer of the Karatsu daimyō Terazawa Katataka.

==== Shimabara ====
Amakusa Shirō (天草 四郎; lit. Fourth Son of Heaven)
Also known as Masuda Tokisada (益田 時貞), the son of former Konishi clan retainer Masuda Jinbei (益田甚兵衛). He was touted by the leaders of the Shimabara Uprising as the "Fourth Son of Heaven", foretold by the Jesuit missionary, Saint Francis Xavier, to be destined to lead the Christianization of Japan.
In this manga, Tokisada was captured by Yatsuka Naozumi, who currently is head of Tomioka Castle, and made to Naozumi's slave (due to his resemblance to Naozumi's crush Hayumi Natsuki). He was kind to Naozumi despite his cruel treatment, probably hoping to sway him to the Christian cause and save his soul in the process, but Naozumi killed him after realizing that he was falling in love with him almost as much as with Natsuki. His last words were of forgiveness and kindness.
Matsukura Katsuie (松倉 勝家)
The son of Matsukura Shigemasa. Daimyō of Shimabara, renowned for his cruelty. He sparks the Shimabara rebellion by capturing a pregnant woman and placing her in a drowning pit as punishment for being a Christian; he also does this in the manga, with the bonus of also imprisoning his kind-hearted concubine Kichō there. In story, he is executed as punishment for causing the rebellion. In the manga, he is killed by the heroes.
Kichō (Kikuhime)
Concubine of Katsuie who falls in love with Eiji. A beautiful and kind woman who wants to leave her cruel lord and help the peasants.
Okamoto Shinbei (岡本 新兵衛)
Shimabara-han retainer.
Mori Sōiken (森 宗意軒)
One of the leaders of Shimabara Rebellion. Shimabara-han retainer.
Yamada Kinji
Old friend of Shirō. Always mistakes Natsuki for the real Shirō. Later falls in love with Eri. He is possibly named after the real life Yamada Emosaku who betrayed the Shimabara cause to the Shogunate and was the only known survivor after the rebellion.

==== Kumamoto ====
Hosokawa Mitsutoshi (細川 光利)
Eldest son of Hosokawa Tadatoshi. Present daimyō of Kumamoto-han.

==== Bungo ====
Matsudaira Tadanao (松平 忠直)
Son of Yūki Hideyasu, second son of the first Tokugawa shogun Ieyasu. Cousin of Iemitsu. A Christian, he is confined in Bungo.

==== Satsuma ====
Shimazu Mitsuhisa (島津 光久)
Daimyō of Satsuma. Son of Shimazu Iehisa Tadatsune, the child of Shimazu Yoshihiro and the former daimyō of Satsuma.
Ookohime
Concubine of Mitsuhisa. An intelligent woman.

==== Fukuoka ====
Kuroda Tadayuki (黒田 忠之)
Son of Kuroda Nagamasa, the child of Kuroda Kanbei Yoshitaka. Daimyō of Fukuoka-han. An intelligent man.
Kuriyama Taizen (栗山 大膳)
Retainer of Lord Kuroda of Fukuoka.

==== Kokura ====
Ogasawara Tadazane (小笠原 忠真)
Daimyō of Kokura. His mother was the niece of the first Tokugawa shōgun Ieyasu.
Oba Kuranosuke
Retainer of Lord Ogasawara of Kokura.

=== The Dutchmen ===
Jan (ヤン, Yan)
Captain of the warship de Rijp (named after De Rijp). Falls in love with Seika (also known by her baptismal name of Mariana).
Nicolaes Couckebacker (ニコラス クーケバッケル, Nikorasu Kūkebakkeru)
Governor of the Dutch trading post in Nagasaki and a cold-hearted man. He later takes command of the warship de Rijp.

== See also ==
- Shimabara Rebellion
- Edo period
