= Alpen Rose =

Japanese manga series

- Cover of volume 1

アルペンローゼ (Arupen Rōze)
- Genre: Drama, Historical, Romance
- Manga
- Written by: Michiyo Akaishi
- Published by: Shogakukan
- Magazine: Ciao
- Original run: April 1983 – May 1986
- Volumes: 9
- Anime television series

Honō no Alpen Rose: Judy & Randy
- Directed by: Hidehito Ueda
- Produced by: Kazuya Maeda (Fuji TV); Ryunosuke Endo (Fuji TV); Minoru Ono (Yomiko); Masatoshi Yui
- Written by: Sukehiro Tomita
- Music by: Joe Hisaishi
- Studio: Tatsunoko Production
- Original network: Fuji TV
- Original run: April 6, 1985 – October 5, 1985
- Episodes: 20
- icon

Alpen Rose (アルペンローゼ, Arupen Rōze) is a shōjo manga series created by Michiyo Akaishi. The story was adapted into an anime titled Alpine Rose by Tatsunoko Production in 1985, with character designs by Akemi Takada.

== Summary ==
Randy is a young boy who lives with his aunt and uncle in Switzerland in the early 1930s. One day while walking around the Alps, Randy finds a little girl who is the only survivor of a plane crash and has lost all her memories. She is named Jeudi by him and both of them are raised together. As they grow up together, Jeudi and Randy develop a deep friendship for each other...

A few years later Jeudi wants to find her past. Her only clue is a song that she is constantly hearing in her head, a song called "Alpen Rose". At the time of World War II, Jeudi and Randy set on a journey to discover Jeudi's past and in the process learn the depth of the love they have for each other.

== Characters ==
- Randy Cortot (Keiichi Nanba) is a Swiss young man who lives not too far from the Alps with his aunt and uncle. As a little kid, he found a girl around his age with her pet cockatoo lying in a field of flowers, and convinced his aunt and uncle to take her in. After an incident with Count George de Germont, in which he and Printemps are almost shot by him, Jeudi is taken to the Count's castle by force. He helps her escape and they must flee their village. This also gives them the chance to both get hitched and start investigating Jeudi's strange past.
- Jeudi/Alicia Brendel (Yoshino Takamori) was found amnesiac and unconscious by Randy, who gave her the name "Jeudi". She was subsequently taken in by a shopkeeper in the manga or nursing school in the anime. At age 13, Jeudi catches the eye of Count Germont when she protect Randy and Printemps, and he takes her by force to his castle to make her his concubine. Randy comes to her rescue and they flee to the town of Bern after they begin to have leads about her true identity. Eventually they learn her real name is Alicia Brendel.
- Printemps (Masako Katsuki) is Jeudi's pet cockatoo, who has been with her ever since before the fateful accident that brought her to Randy's life.
- Leonhard "Leon" Aschenbach (Kazuhiko Inoue) is a famous Austrian pianist.
- Count George de Germont (Shuichi Ikeda) is an arrogant aristocrat who is in pursuit of Jeudi, and is revealed to have gained influence within the Nazis. His ambition is to rule the world.
- Countess Francoise de Germont (Rihoko Yoshida) is Count de Germont's wife who dislikes what he has become. She eventually decides to end it by shooting him and burning his house, and committing suicide.
- Friedrich Brendel (Hideo Nakamura) is Jeudi/Alicia's father.
- Hélène Dunant-Brendel (Tomoko Munakata) is Jeudi/Alicia's mother.
- Jacques Dunant (Yuzuru Fujimoto) is Jeudi/Alicia's grandfather, a relative of Henry Dunant.
- Christine Dunant (Matsuko Inaba) is Jeudi/Alicia's grandmother.
- Matilda Toulonchamp (Saeko Shimazu) is a girl posing as Hélène's daughter, Alicia.
- Michel Toulonchamp (Masaru Ikeda) is Matilda's father who is considered to be Basil Zaharoff's successor as an arms dealer. He supported the Dunant family and sent his daughter Matilda to pose as Hélène's daughter, Alicia, to gain control of the Dunants due to their involvement in founding the Red Cross.
- Hans (Yoku Shioya) is a boy who died helping Randy and Jeudi to get away from Count de Germont.
- Clara (Keiko Yokozawa) is Hans's little sister.
- Martha (Noriko Hidaka) is a girl who was friends with Hans.
- Jean-Jacques Cortot (Show Hayami) is an assassin with the nickname "Tarantula". It is later revealed that he is Randy's brother.
- Duboir (Toshiya Ueda) is a man who works under Count de Germont.
- Henri Guisan (Toru Ohira) is a Swiss military officer who held the office of General of the Swiss Armed Forces during the Second World War, and who appears in the story to help Jeudi and Randy throughout it.

== Manga ==
The manga series was originally serialized in Japan, in 1983, in the weekly magazine Ciao by Shogakukan, with the first volume of the series being released in October 1983. The second, third, and fourth followed in February 1984, July 1984, and November 1984. And from then on chapters of the story were released periodically over the next three years with volumes of the manga series being released in a 3- to 6-month period. The series was finished in late 1986, finishing the storyline in nine small volumes of approximately 180 pages. The remaining volumes (5, 6, 7 8, and 9) were released in February 1985, July 1985, December 1985, June 1986, and September 1986.

The manga series was reissued 1993 by Shogakukan through the publishing branch Flower Comics Wide Magazine. This new version was released in four large volumes of at least approximately 350 pages. This new version included new covers, colored pages in each volume as well was pin-ups at the end of the volumes. More recently the series was reissued in Japan in 2009 in four volumes by Flower Comics DeLuxe with different covers which were a combination of black-and-white photos of different parts of Paris, France with picture of the main characters of the series in the center.

== Episodes ==
No.	Title	Directed by	Written by	Animation directed by	Original release date
1	"Prologue to the Torrent of Love"	Koji Sawai	Sukehiro Tomita	Hiroshi Hamasaki	April 6, 1985
2	"Angel in the Light"	Shinya Sadamitsu	Sukehiro Tomita	Nobukazu Sakuma	April 13, 1985
3	"A Whistle Beyond Death"	Akira Shigino	Shigeru Yanagawa	U-Yeong Jeong	May 4, 1985
4	"Seconds Until Trap"	Directed by : Chisato Shigeki; Storyboarded by : Hirose Chieko	Hiroko Naka	Takafumi Hayashi	May 18, 1985
5	"The Past Hidden in the Garden"	Shinya Sadamitsu	Sukehiro Tomita	Takashi Saijō	May 25, 1985
6	"The Melody of Red Roses"	Directed by : Koji Sawai; Storyboarded by : Akira Shigino	Sukehiro Tomita	Hiroshi Hamasaki	June 1, 1985
7	"Resound! To the Skies of our Homeland"	Directed by : Tetsuya Kobayashi; Storyboarded by : Hidehito Ueda	Sukehiro Tomita	Nobukazu Sakuma	June 15, 1985
8	"The Beautiful Fugitives"	Osamu Uemura	Hiroko Naka	Takafumi Hayashi	June 22, 1985
9	"Randy's Knight Sword"	Shinya Sadamitsu	Shigeru Yanagawa	Juuji Mizumura	June 29, 1985
10	"Memories and the Morning Goodbye"	Directed by : Chisato Shigeki; Storyboarded by : Koji Sawai	Sukehiro Tomita	U-Yeong Jeong	July 13, 1985
11	"Ruined Ambition"	Directed by : Tetsuya Kobayashi; Storyboarded by : Akira Shigino	Sukehiro Tomita	Hiroshi Hamasaki	July 27, 1985
12	"There's Two Alicia!?"	Koji Sawai	Hiroko Naka	Chuichi Iguchi	August 3, 1985
13	"The Song of Love"	Takaaki Ishiyama	Hiroko Naka	Takafumi Hayashi	August 10, 1985
14	"Farewell to Peace"	Shinya Sadamitsu	Shigeru Yanagawa	Takashi Saijō	August 24, 1985
15	"The Lonely Piano"	Directed by : Chisato Shigeki; Storyboarded by : Shinya Sadamitsu	Hiroko Naka	Hiroshi Hamasaki	August 31, 1985
16	"The Assassin of Paris"	Osamu Uemura	Shigeru Yanagawa	Takafumi Hayashi	September 7, 1985
17	"The Escaping Hans"	Shinya Sadamitsu	Sukehiro Tomita	Hiroshi Hamasaki	September 14, 1985
18	"Love Song Among the Fog"	Directed by : Chisato Shigeki; Storyboarded by : Shinya Sadamitsu	Shigeru Yanagawa	Naoyuki Onda	September 21, 1985
19	"The Gun Pointed at Freedom"	Takaaki Ishiyama	Hiroko Naka	Takafumi Hayashi	September 28, 1985
20	"The Wings of a Dream"	Koji Sawai	Sukehiro Tomita	Takashi Saijō	October 5, 1985
