= Otto Bänninger =

Swiss sculptor (1897-1973)

- Born: Otto Charles Bänninger; 24 January 1897; Zurich, Switzerland
- Died: 15 May 1973 (aged 76); Zurich, Switzerland
- Known for: Figurative sculpture

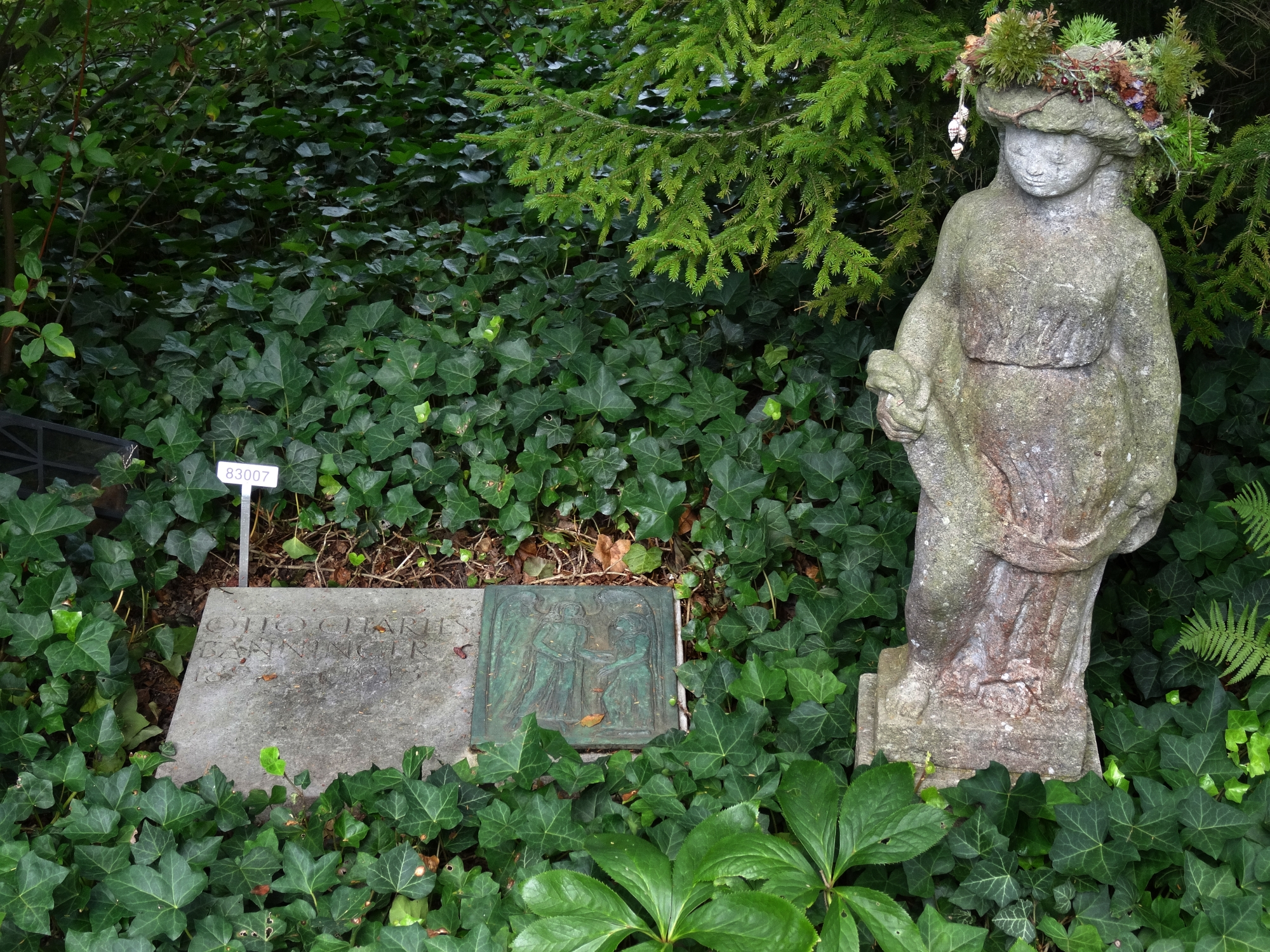
Grave of Bänninger at Enzenbühl Cemetery, Zurich

Otto Charles Bänninger (24 January 1897 – 15 May 1973) was a Swiss figurative sculptor who received first prize for sculpture at the Venice Biennale in 1942. Trained under Émile-Antoine Bourdelle in Paris, he became known for portraits and monuments.

== Biography ==
Otto Charles Bänninger was born in Zurich on 24 January 1897. From 1913 to 1918, he completed an apprenticeship in sculpture under Franz Wanger in Zurich. He then studied at the Académie de la Grande Chaumière in Paris from 1920 to 1921 under Émile-Antoine Bourdelle.

In 1921, Bänninger joined Bourdelle’s private studio as an assistant, and the two became friends. In Bourdelle’s studio, he met the French sculptor Germaine Richier, whom he married in 1929. After Bourdelle died in 1929, Bänninger completed several commissions that the older sculptor had left unfinished.

A journey through Florence, Rome, Naples and Pompeii in 1928 gave Bänninger the opportunity to study ancient and Renaissance art. He returned to Zurich in 1932, although Paris remained an important working base for several months each year. In 1936, he became a member of the Salon d'Automne. In 1939, he made Zurich his permanent home. He resumed regular visits to Paris after the Second World War.

Bänninger and Richier divorced in 1951, and he married Johanna Stern in 1953. He received the first International Prize for Sculpture at the Venice Biennale in 1942 and the City of Zurich Art Prize in 1956. He died in Zurich on 15 May 1973.

== Work ==
Bänninger was a figurative sculptor whose work drew on classical subjects. During his Paris years, his sculpture was influenced by Auguste Rodin and Émile-Antoine Bourdelle. In the 1930s, he developed a more contemplative approach to the classical human figure.

Portraits and monuments were important parts of his work. He produced many portraits during the 1940s. His subjects included the writer Charles-Ferdinand Ramuz, the art collector Oskar Reinhart and the industrialist and collector Emil Bührle. From the early 1930s to the 1960s, he received numerous commissions for monuments and architectural sculpture. His public works included the equestrian monument to Henri Guisan in Lausanne, completed in 1967, and Die Schreitende in Zurich, commissioned after he won a 1942 City of Zurich competition for a freestanding sculpture on what is now Sechseläutenplatz.

For the 1939 Swiss National Exhibition in Zurich, Bänninger produced the plaster sculpture Knabe mit Pferd. The horse was later destroyed, while the figure of the boy is held by the City of Zurich. The complete work is now known only from photographs.

== Legacy ==
Bänninger became a prominent figure in Swiss sculpture during the interwar and postwar periods, particularly within the country’s modern figurative tradition. Several of his public sculptures remain in place across Switzerland.

In 2013, his family donated his written estate to the Swiss Art Archive. The collection includes correspondence with his wife, the sculptor Germaine Richier, as well as letters from artists and writers, including Cuno Amiet and Hermann Hesse.

== Gallery ==
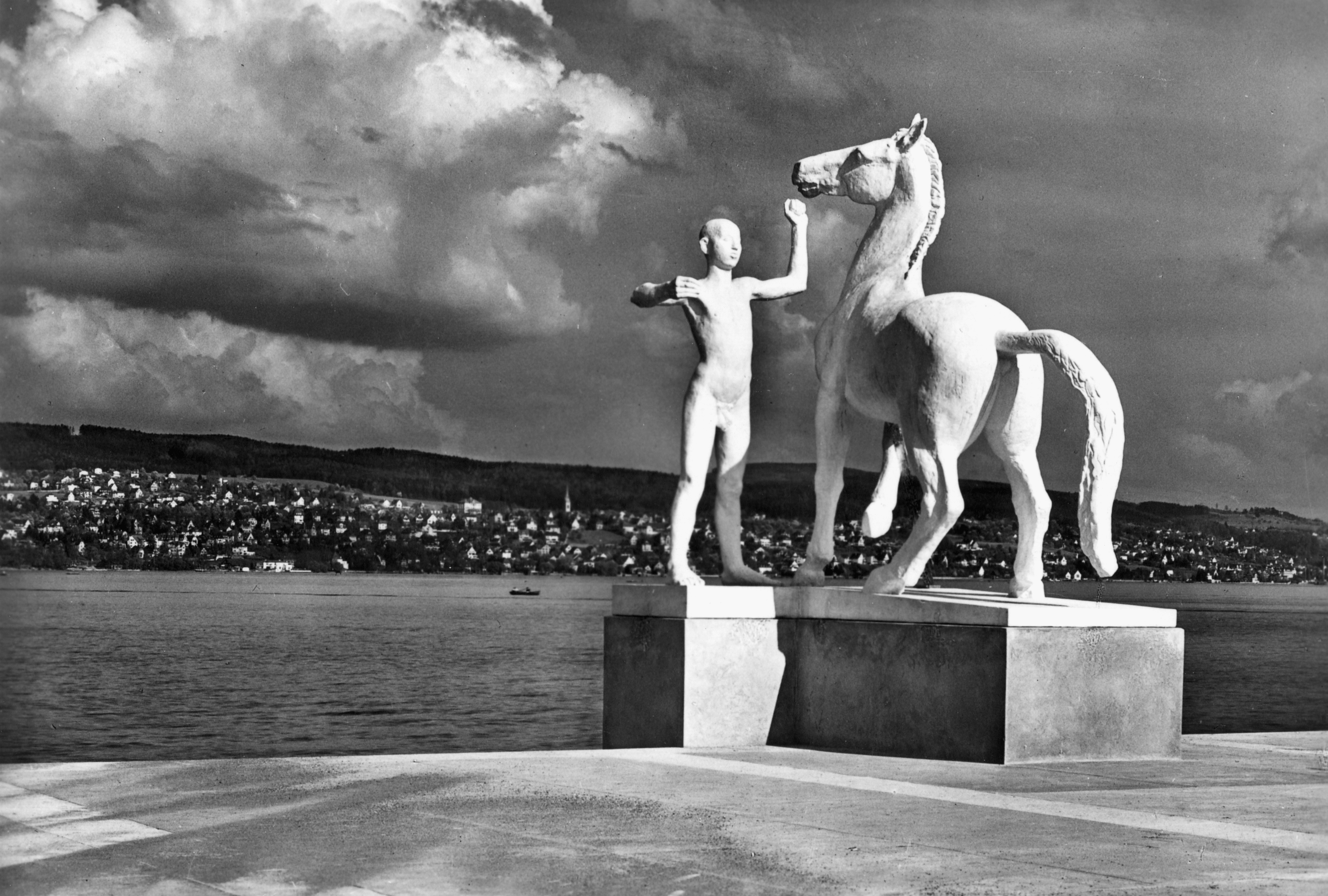
Knabe mit Pferd (1939), Swiss National Exhibition, Zürich; horse later destroyed

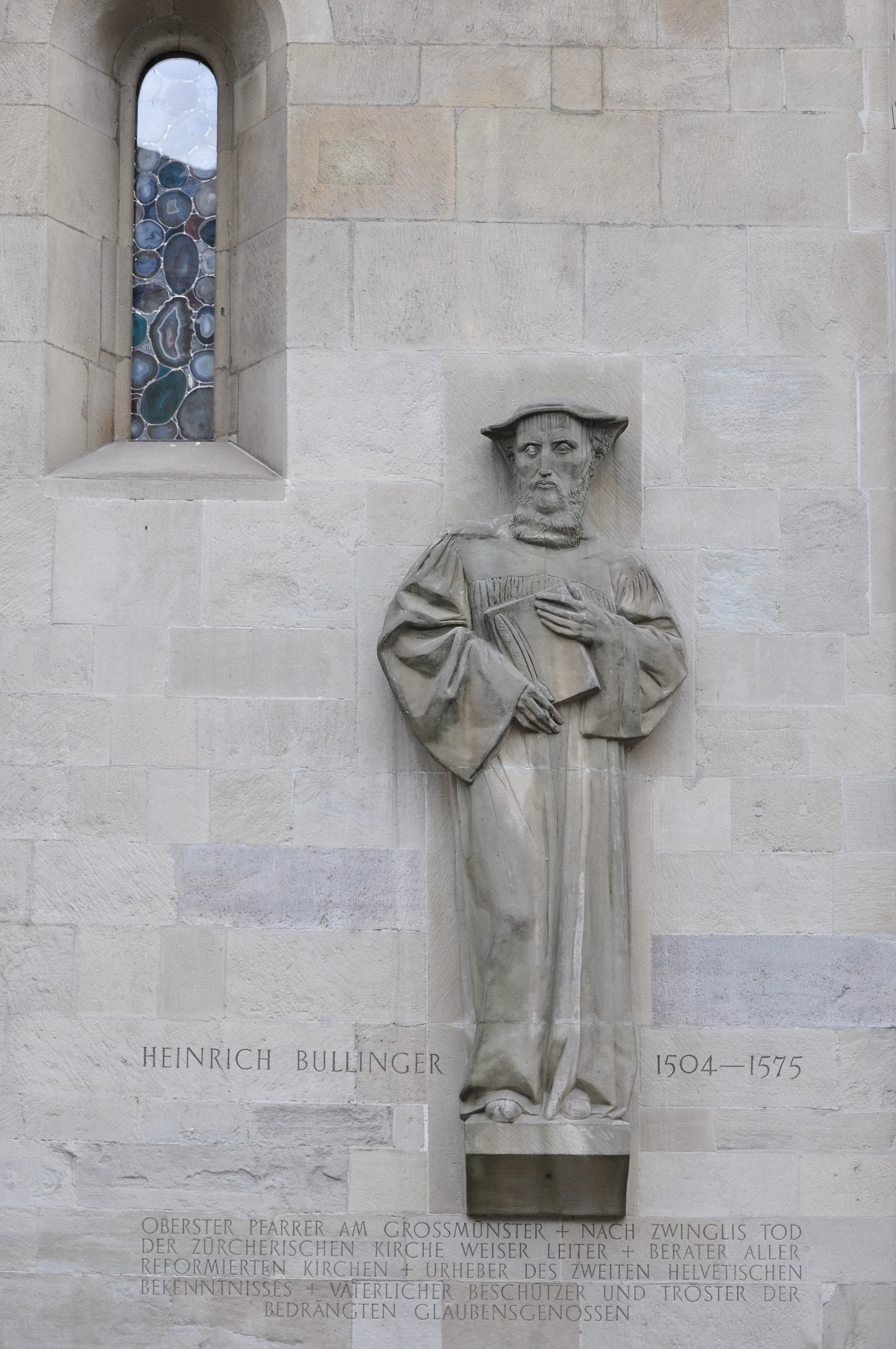
Monument to Heinrich Bullinger (1939–1940), Grossmünster, Zürich

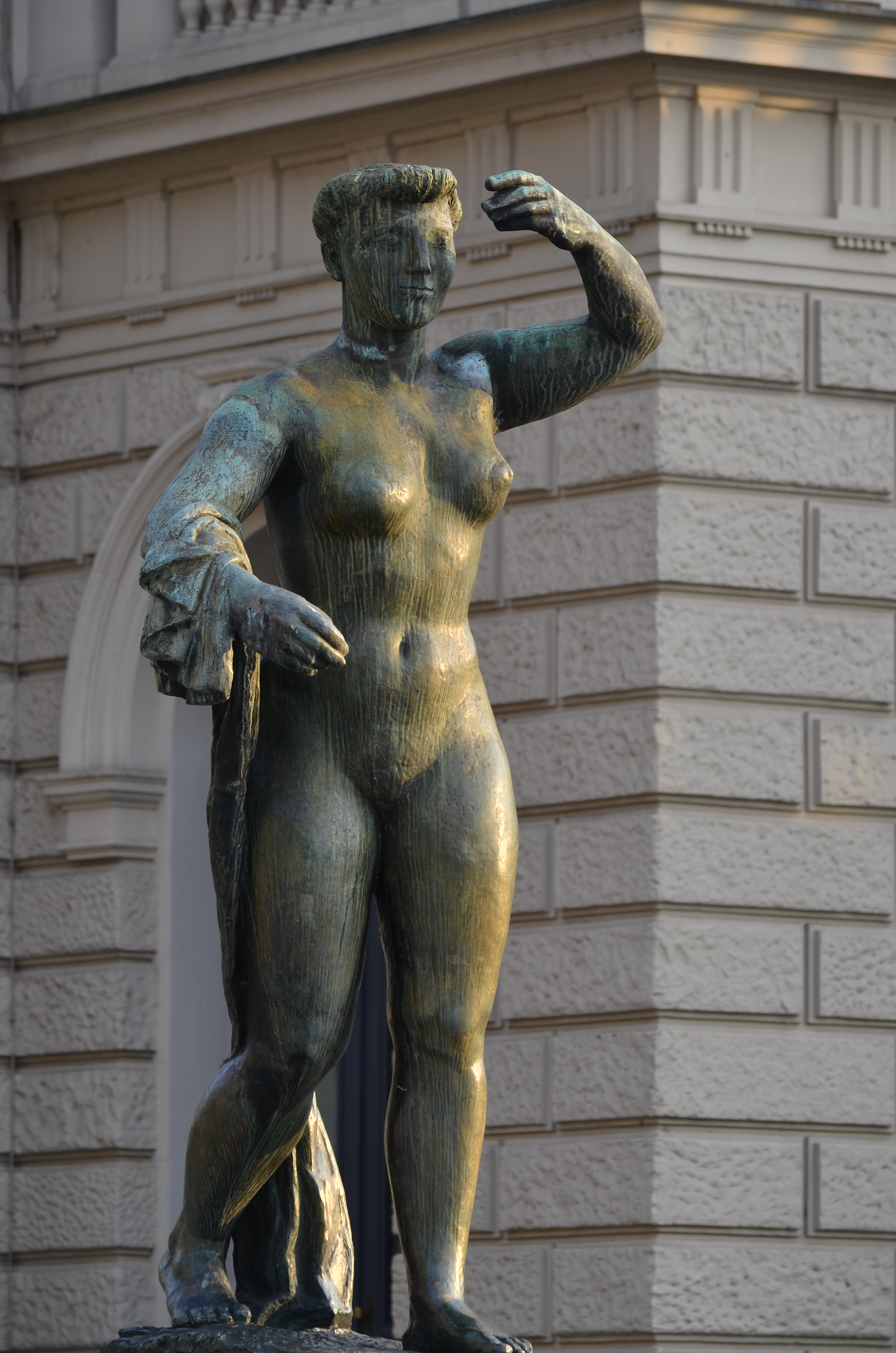
Die Schreitende (1942–1946), Sechseläutenplatz, Zürich

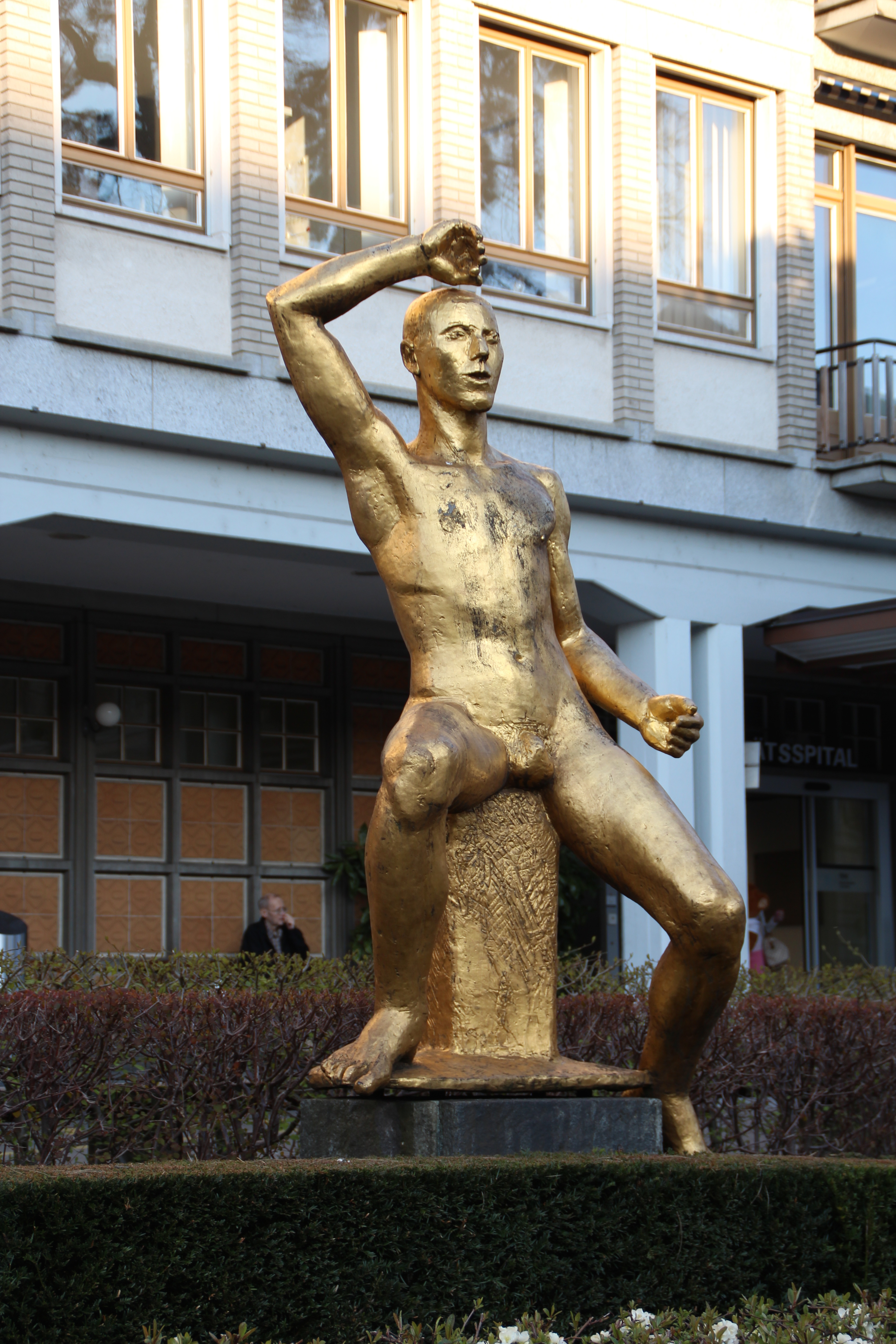
Der Genesende (1946–1948), University Hospital of Zürich

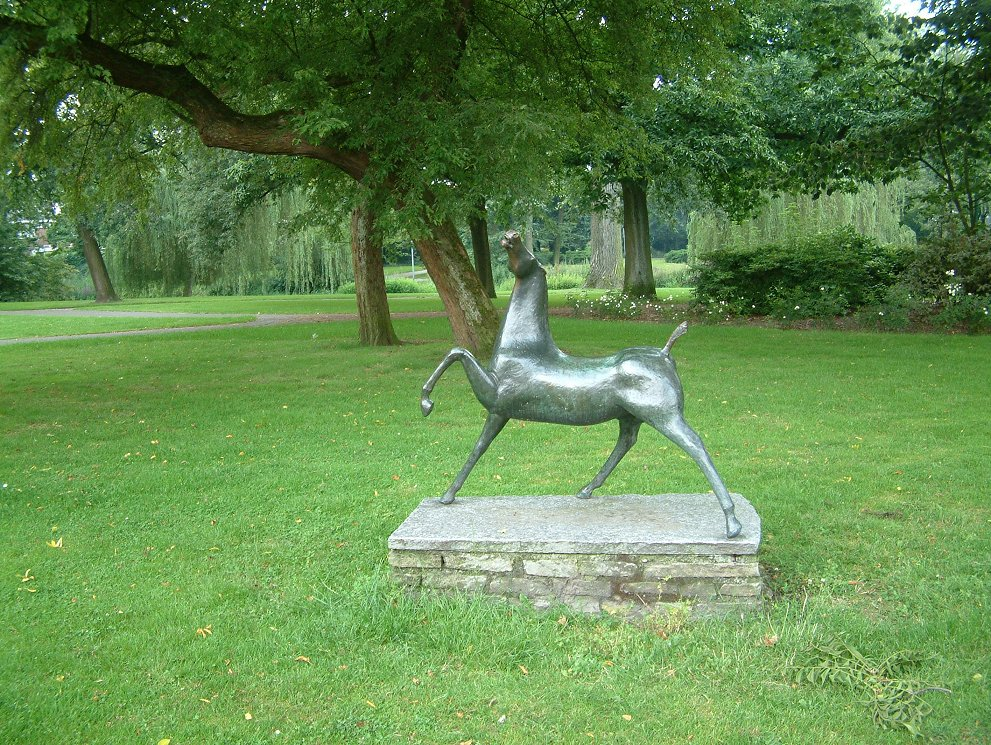
Horse (1954), Anne Frankplantsoen, Eindhoven; stolen in 2010

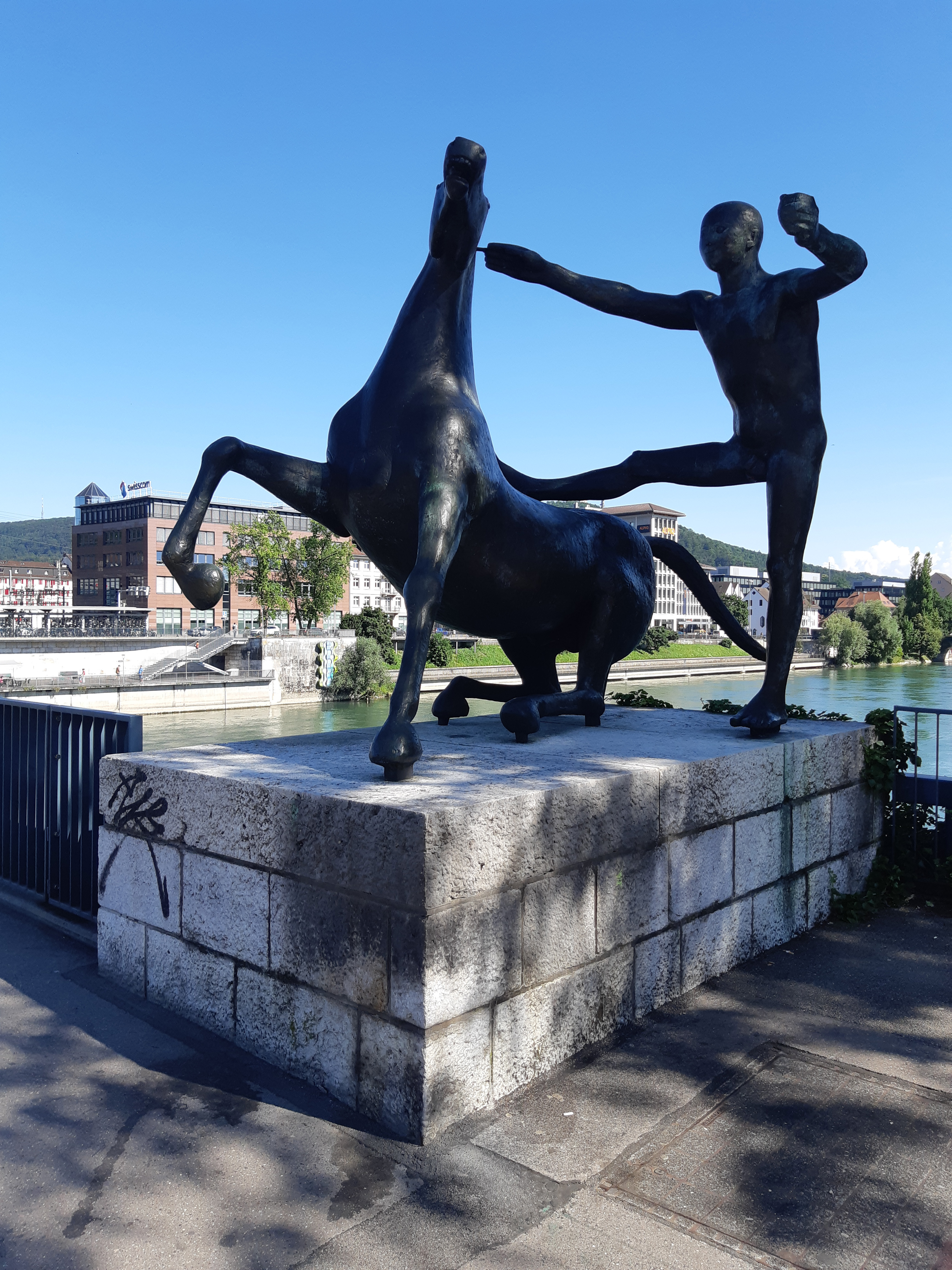
Remonte! (from 1957), Aare bridge, Olten

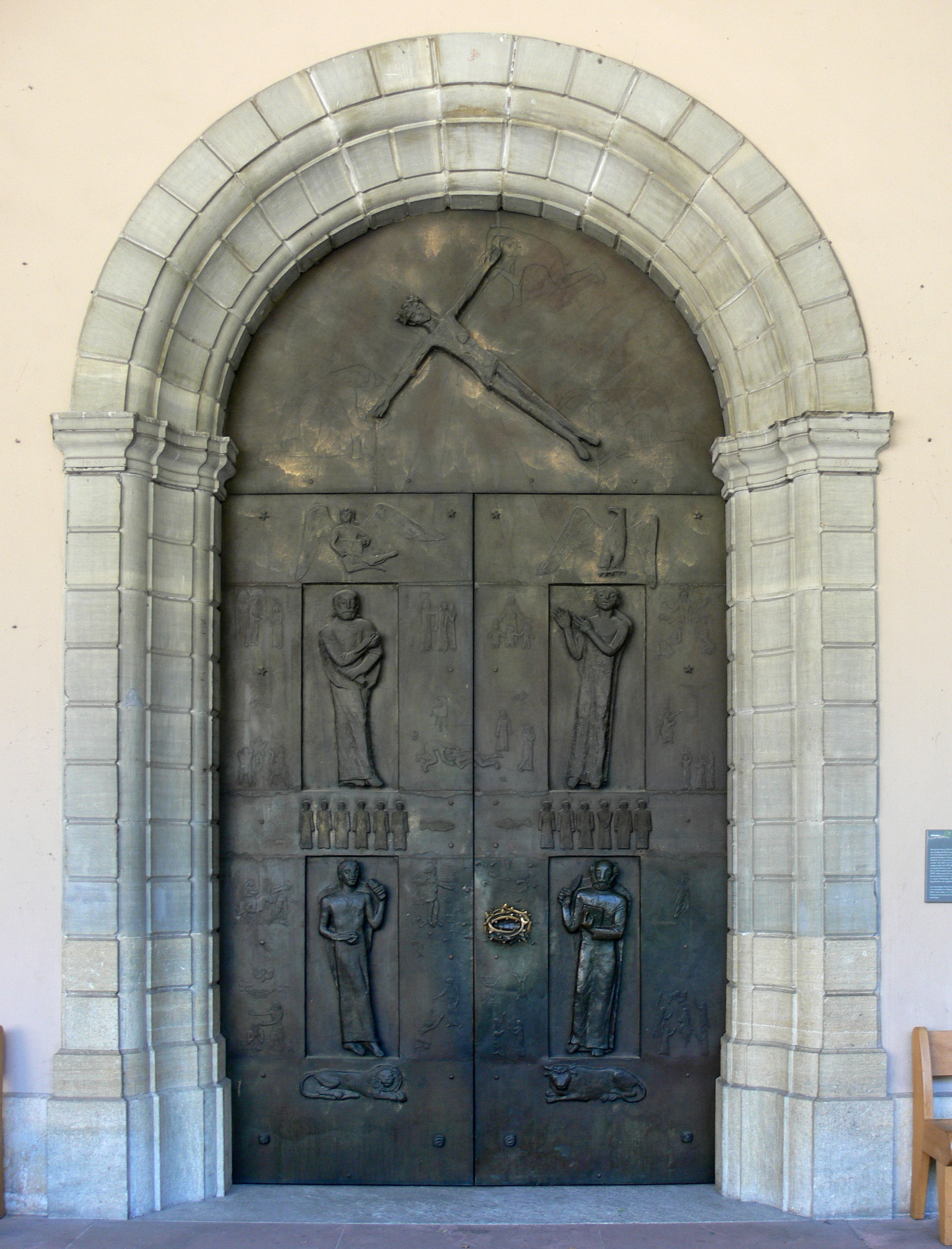
Bronze portal reliefs (1957–1959), Münster Schaffhausen

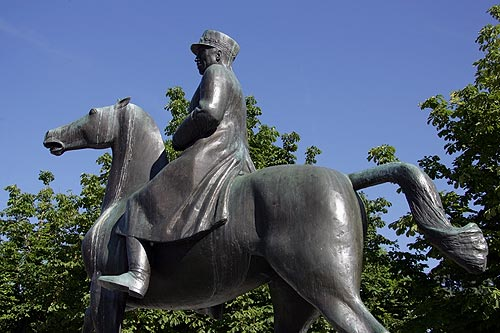
Equestrian monument to Henri Guisan (1967), Ouchy, Lausanne
