= Akaishi (surname) =

Akaishi (written: 赤石 lit "red stone") is a Japanese surname. Notable people with the surname include:

- Kosei Akaishi (赤石 光生, born 1965), Japanese sport wrestler
- Michiyo Akaishi (赤石 路代, born 1959), Japanese manga artist
