= Germaine Richier =

French artist

- Born: 16 September 1902; Grans, France
- Died: 21 July 1959 (aged 56); Montpellier, France
- Known for: Sculpture

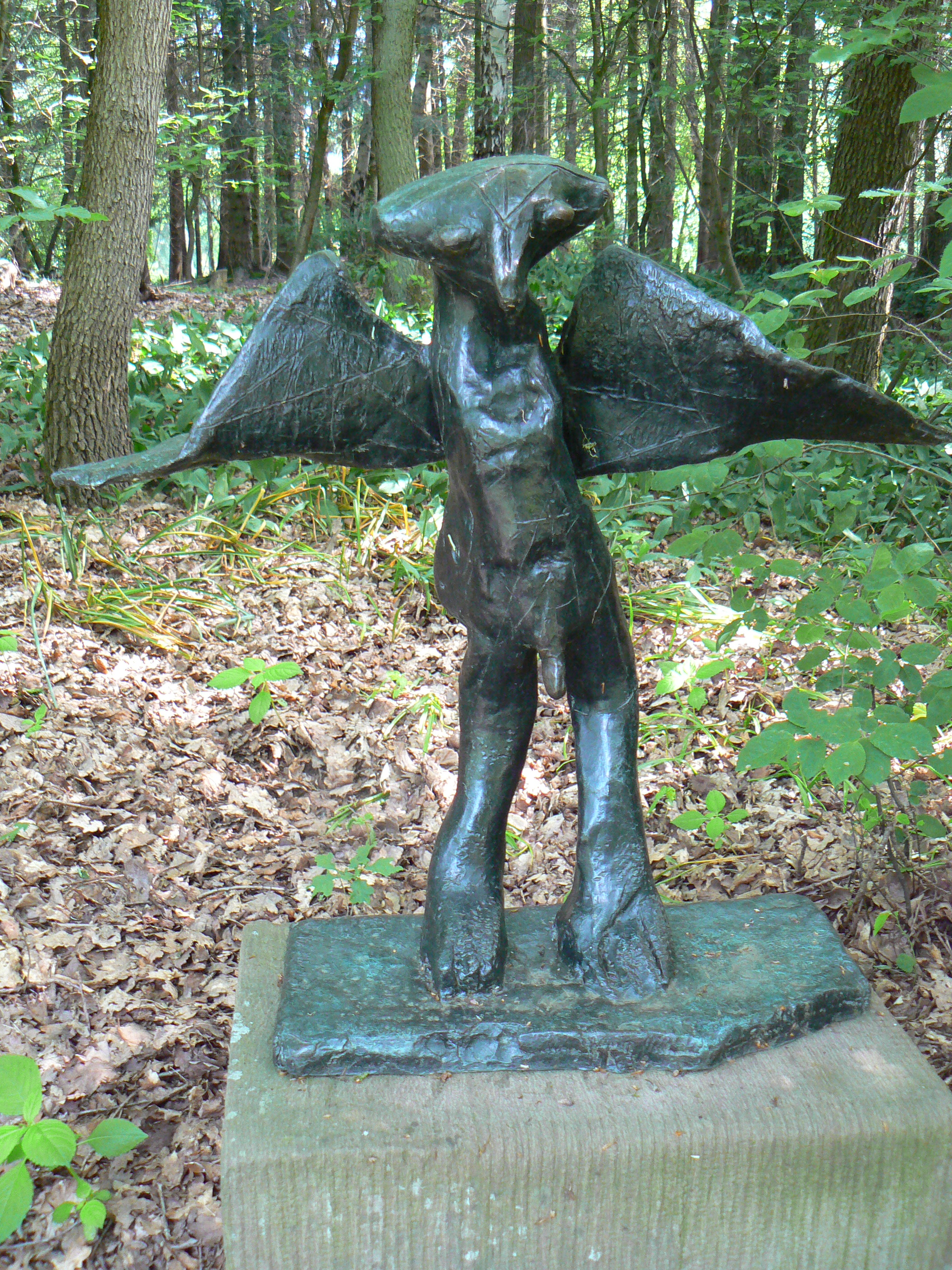
Germaine Richier: Le grand homme de la nuit (1954/55) in the sculpturepark KMM/The Netherlands

Germaine Richier (16 September 1902 – 21 July 1959) was a French sculptor.

Born in Grans, Richier began her studies at the Ecole des Beaux Arts in Montpellier, in the atelier of Louis-Jacques Guigues; in 1926 she went to work with Antoine Bourdelle, remaining in his studio until his death in 1929. There she became acquainted with Alberto Giacometti, although the two were never close. Richier for her part was more interested in a classical approach to sculpture, preferring to work from a live model and then reworking the final product. She also met César Baldaccini at this stage in her career. She married Otto Bänninger on 12 December 1929. In 1936, she won the Prix Blumenthal. During the war, she met Marino Marini, in exile in Switzerland.

== Career ==
Richier's early work was fantastic, combining classical forms with human-animal hybrids and depicting creatures such as the spider and the hydra. Her style became less figurative after World War II; the bodily deformations which she favoured as subjects were more accentuated in an attempt to convey a greater sense of anguish.

=== Controversy ===
The greatest controversy surrounding Richier's work came about with her creation of a statue of Christ for the church of Notre-Dame de Toute Grâce du Plateau d'Assy. Meant to depict the physical and spiritual torment of Christ, she explained that: the cross has been taken with the suffering into the flesh, and its outlines can just be made out coming from the undersides of the arms. There is no face because God is the spirit and faceless.... The sculpture was ordered removed from sight by the bishop of Annecy. This event was the catalyst for a great argument about the nature and role of sacred art which took place throughout the 1950s, during which many artists found themselves opposed to the traditional role of religious and academic art. Some have also described the controversy as a debate over the nature of God in modern society.

Richier, for her part, gained some notoriety from the entire business, but seemed to retreat into obscurity again before her death in 1959.

=== Retrospectives ===
Retrospectives of her work were held at the Peggy Guggenheim Collection, and the Fondation Maeght in Saint-Paul, Alpes-Maritimes. In 2023, the Centre Pompidou presented a major retrospective of Richier's work. Her works are in the Tuileries Garden, Musée Fabre, and the Tate Collection. Richier was celebrated on a postage stamp issued by La Poste in 1993 as part of a commemorative series depicting artists.

== Personal life and death ==
Richier died of cancer in 1959.
