= Field Army Corps 1 =

Field Army Corps 1 (FAK 1) of the Swiss Army was a formation composed of several Divisions, Brigades, and directly subordinate corps troops led by a corps commander (during the Army 61 period known as a chief corps commander). The 1st Army Corps (since 1961 Field Army Corps 1) existed from 1891 to 2003.

In 1891, the Swiss army was first divided into five army corps. Paul Cérésole, a member of the Federal Council from 1870 to 1875 and father of the pacifist Pierre Cérésole, was in 1891 given command of the 1st Army Corps, which he commanded until 1898. In 1917, the army was divided into six divisions, the 1st, 2nd, and 3rd of which were included in the 1st Army Corps.

== World War II ==
After war mobilization in World War II of 2 September 1939, the 3rd Division became the army reserve in the area Laupen - Aarberg - Ins - Murten to prepare the barrier between Neuchâtel and Lake Biel (Operation Order No. 1). The Murten area was upgraded as a cornerstone of the advanced position with additional reinforcements and operated by the Border Brigade 2 and the Light Brigade 1.

Shortly before the outbreak of war, the border troops (troop order 1938) were reorganized with 11 border brigades (Gz Br). During the entire Second World War, the border brigades remained in their home region, the mission area and subordination were often adapted. The 1st Army Corps had the border brigades 1-3.

== Cold War ==
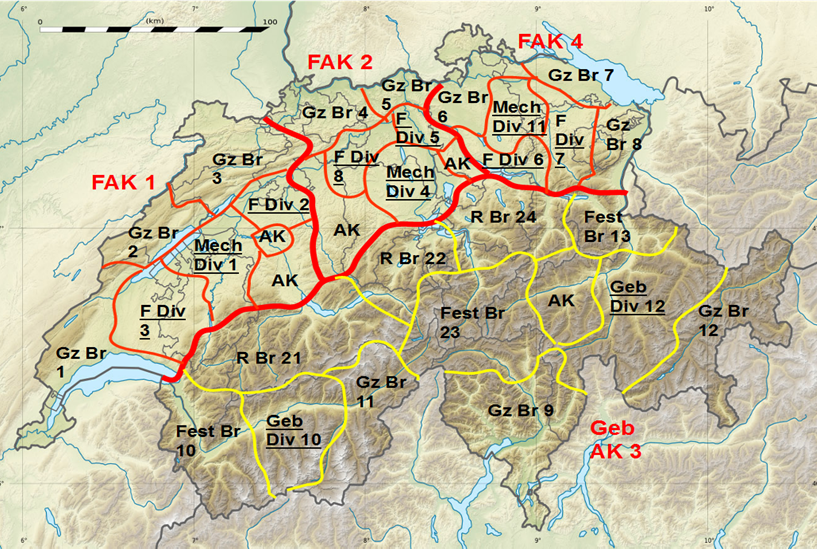
Dispositions of Field Army Corps 1 are shown in the west of Switzerland in this 1992 map

In 1945, the 1st Army Corps was reinforced with the Light Brigade 1, the Mountain Infantry Regiments (rgt inf mont) 5, 6, 7, the Mountain Fusilier Battalion (Geb Füs Bat) 17, and the 3rd Division became the 3rd Mountain Division. In 1947 a Panzerjägerabteilung reinforced the corps. The headquarters was in Bern until the end of World War II and was relocated to Lausanne in 1955.

During the Cold War, Engine Infantry Regiment 2 of Mechanized Division 1 was scheduled to occupy the infantry barrier between its two tank regiments.

In 1961, due to the Army 61 structure plan changes, the following changes were made: The 1st Division became the Mechanized Division (Divméc) 1, the 2nd Divisional Division (Div fr) 2, and the 3rd Division was converted into the Field Division 3. There were also three Border Brigades and the territorial brigade (br ter) 1. The fortress Saint-Maurice became the Fortress Brigade 10 and was transferred to Mountain Army Corps 3.

Under the basic "Zeus" dispositions of 1992, the corps comprised the Mechanized Division 1, the Field Divisions 2 and 3, Border Brigades 1-3, and, as corps troops, Cyclist Regiment 4 and Genieregiment 5 (Engineer Regiment 5).

The Army 95 reforms led to the dissolution of Border Brigades 1, 2, and 3, Mechanized Division 1, and fortifications.

With the new Army XXI plan all army corps and divisions were dissolved at the end of 2003.

== Corps Room and Attack Axes ==
The Swiss Army has due to the Hague Convention the duty to defend their territory from the country's borders according to the principle of Armed Neutrality.

The zone of responsibility of FAK 1 was with about 8000 square kilometers, the largest of all field army corps spaces and included the cantons Geneva, Vaud, Neuchâtel, Freiburg, Berne and Law. It was bilingual and was mainly in the Western Switzerland and consisted of the three sections of the Northern Jura (barrière du Jura), middle part (about 70 km wide) of the Mittellands and the Prealps in the south. It ranged from Geneva to Kleinlützel, from Lake Geneva to Emme and the Vaud, Friborg and Bernese foothills. The border area has strong, favorable terrain for defence, while the area beyond is open and manoeuvrable.

== Corps commanders ==
- 1891–1898 Paul Cérésole
- 1899–1909 Arthur Techtermann
- 1910–1912 Peter Isler
- 1913–1917 Alfred Audéoud (1852–1917)
- 1918–1926 Louis-Henri Bornand (1862–1927)
- 1927–1933 Charles Sarasin (1870–1933)
- 1933–1939 Henri Guisan
- 1939–1940 Renzo Lardelli
- 1940–1949 Jules Borel (1884–1963)
- 1950–1953 Marius Corbat (1893–1965)
- 1954–1961 Samuel Gonard
- 1962–1967 René Dubois
- 1968–1971 Roch de Diesbach (1909–1990)
- 1972–1974 Gérard Lattion
- 1975–1978 Olivier Pittet (1916–2007)
- 1979–1986 Edwin Stettler (1925–2012)
- 1987–1991 Jean-Rodolphe Christen (1934–1997)
- 1992–2001 Jean Abt
- 2001–2003 Alain Rickenbacher

== Literature ==
- Schweizer Feldarmeekorps 1: Bericht über die Manöver vom 9. - 12. November 1914. Nationale Regierungsveröffentlichung.
- Moritz Boschung, Jakob Baumann, Jean-Jacques Chouet, Robert Kopp, Schweizer Feldarmeekorps 1: Leben und Geschichte des Feldarmeekorps 1, 1892-1986. Mit den Biographien der Kommandanten des 1. Korps Paul Cérésole, Louis-Henri Bornand, Henri Guisan, Olivier Pittet, Arthur de Techtermann, Roch de Diesbach. Editions 24 Heures, Lausanne 1986.
- Michel Chabloz, Pierre-François Stoercklé, Irene Bisang, Babigna Pallarès: Sicherheit an der Schwelle des 21. Jahrhunderts. Geschichte und Leben des Feldarmeekorps 1. Verlag Romanel, Lausanne 2000.
- Louis Geiger, Franz Betschon (2009), Erinnerungen an die Armee 61 (in German), Frauenfeld: Huber, ISBN 3719315134
- Jürg Keller: Das 1. Armeekorps im Aktivdienst 1939-1945. GMS Jahresschrift 2010.
