= Tomioka Castle =

Coordinates: 32°31′44.07″N 130°1′54.78″E

Tomioka Castle (富岡城, Tomioka-jō) is a Japanese castle located in Tomioka, Reihoku Town, Amakusa District, Kumamoto Prefecture. During the 16th century, it was the castle of Terasawa Katataka, a daimyō who played a critical part in repressing the Shimabara Rebellion.

Tomioka Castle

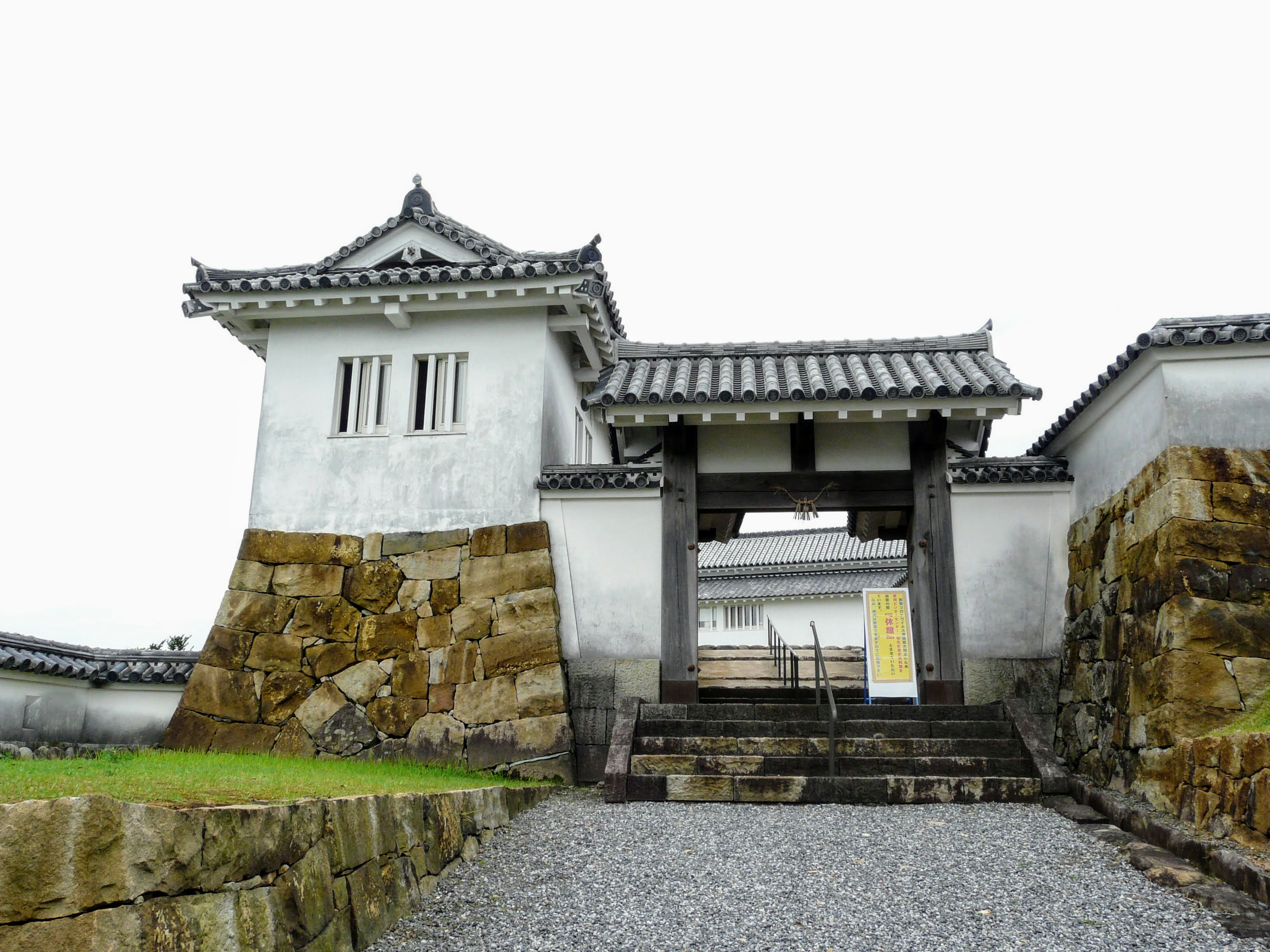
Korai Gate of Tomioka Castle

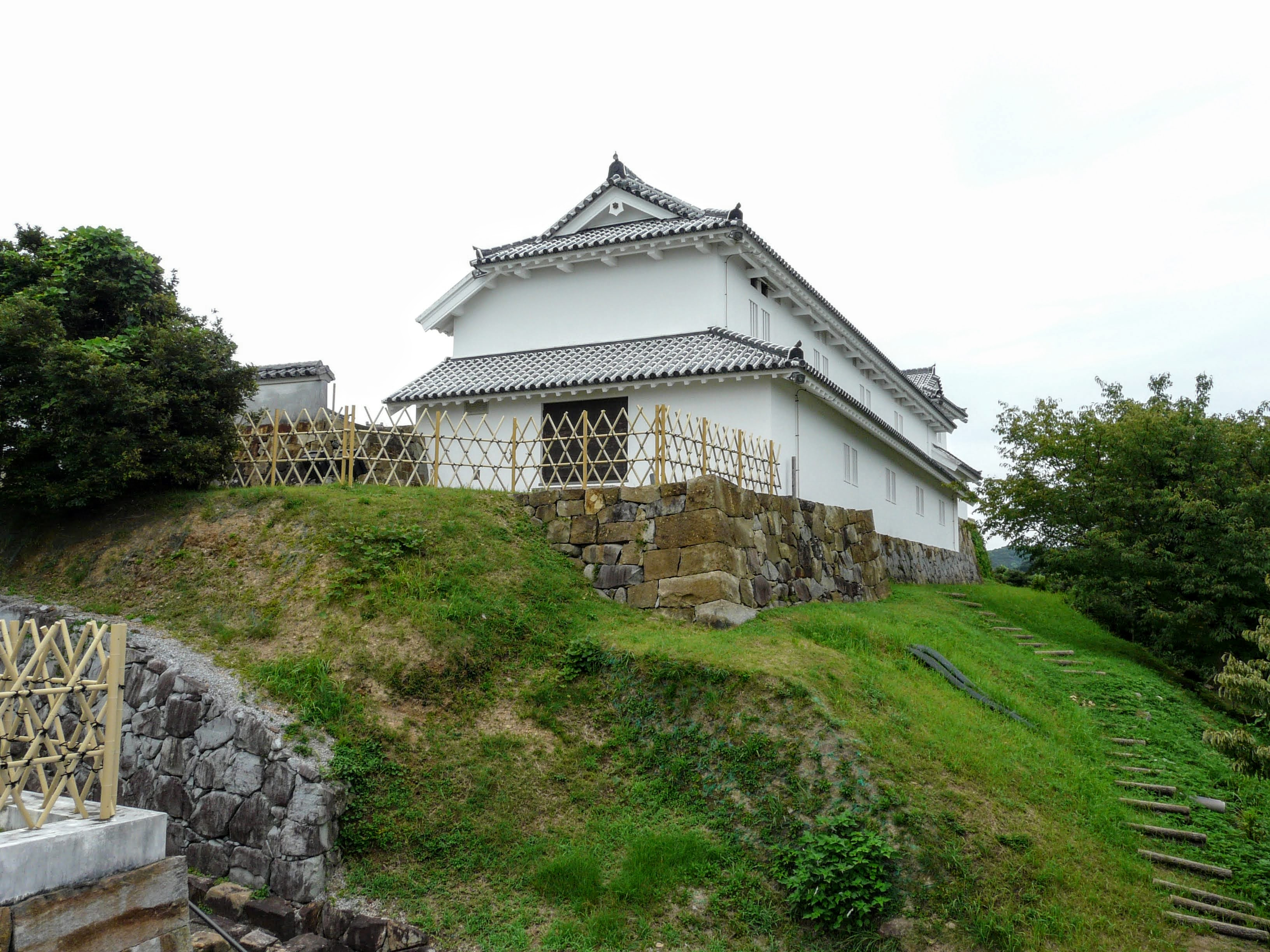
Tomioka Visitor Center

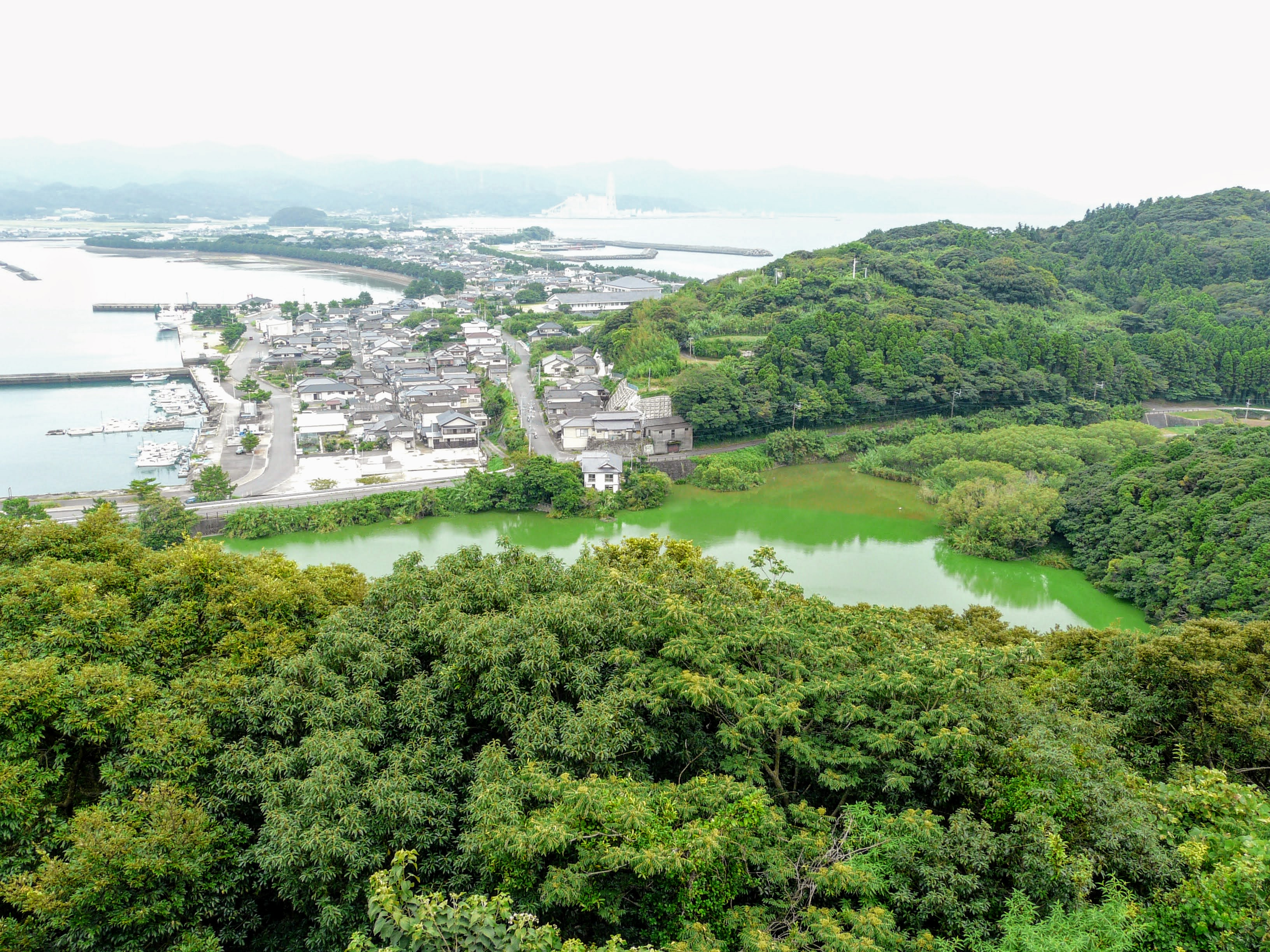
View from Tomioka Castle

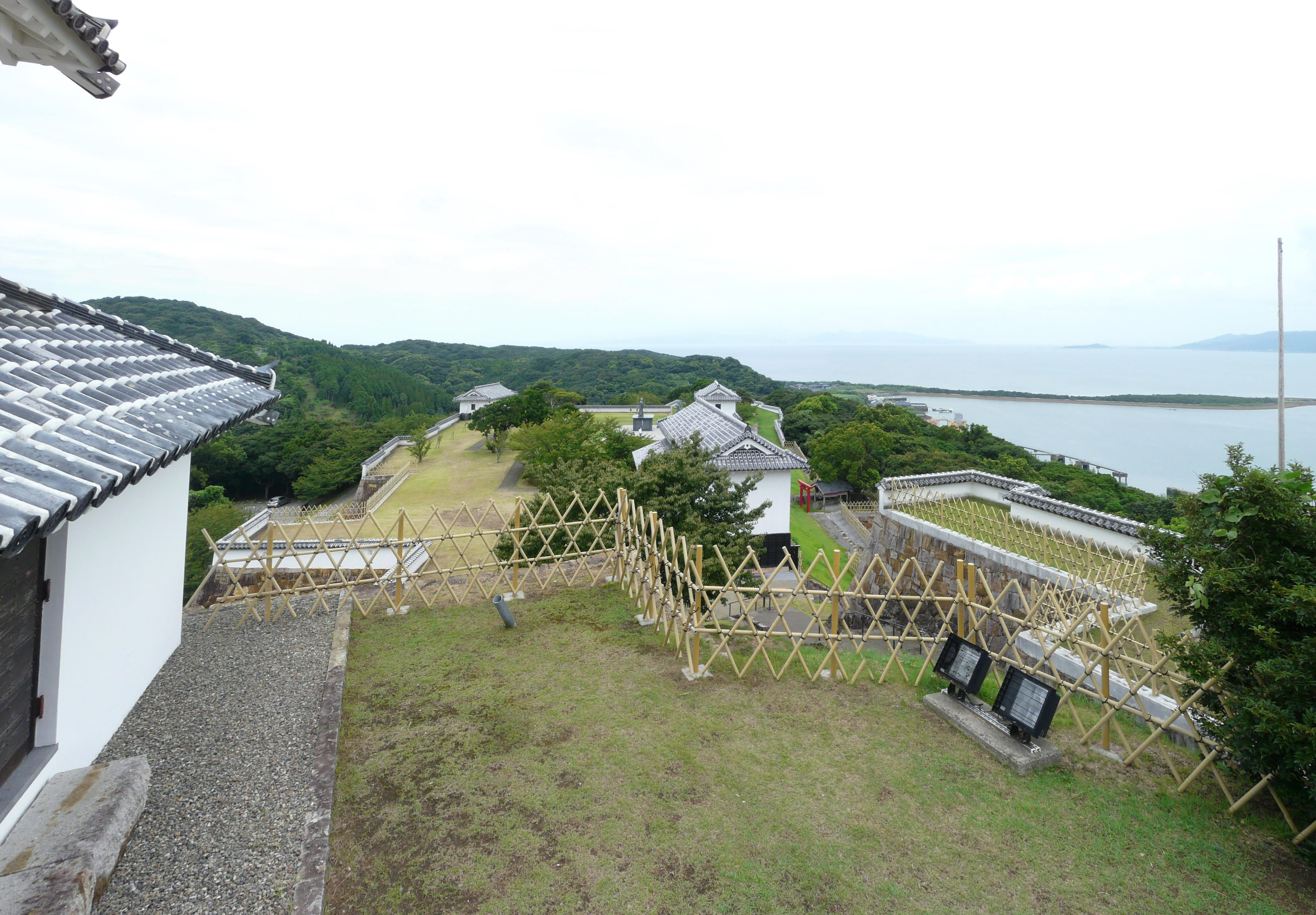
The grounds of Tomioka Castle

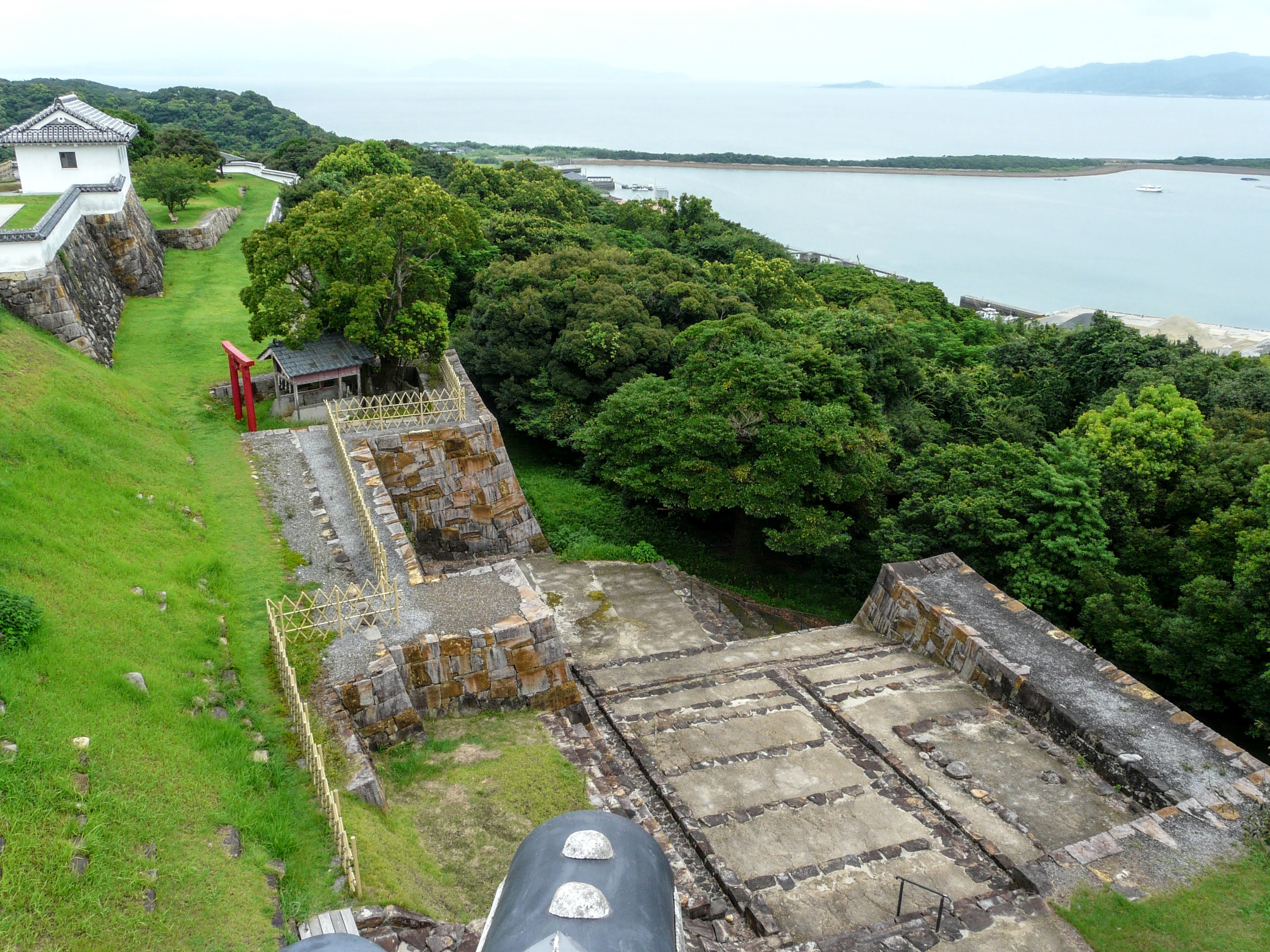

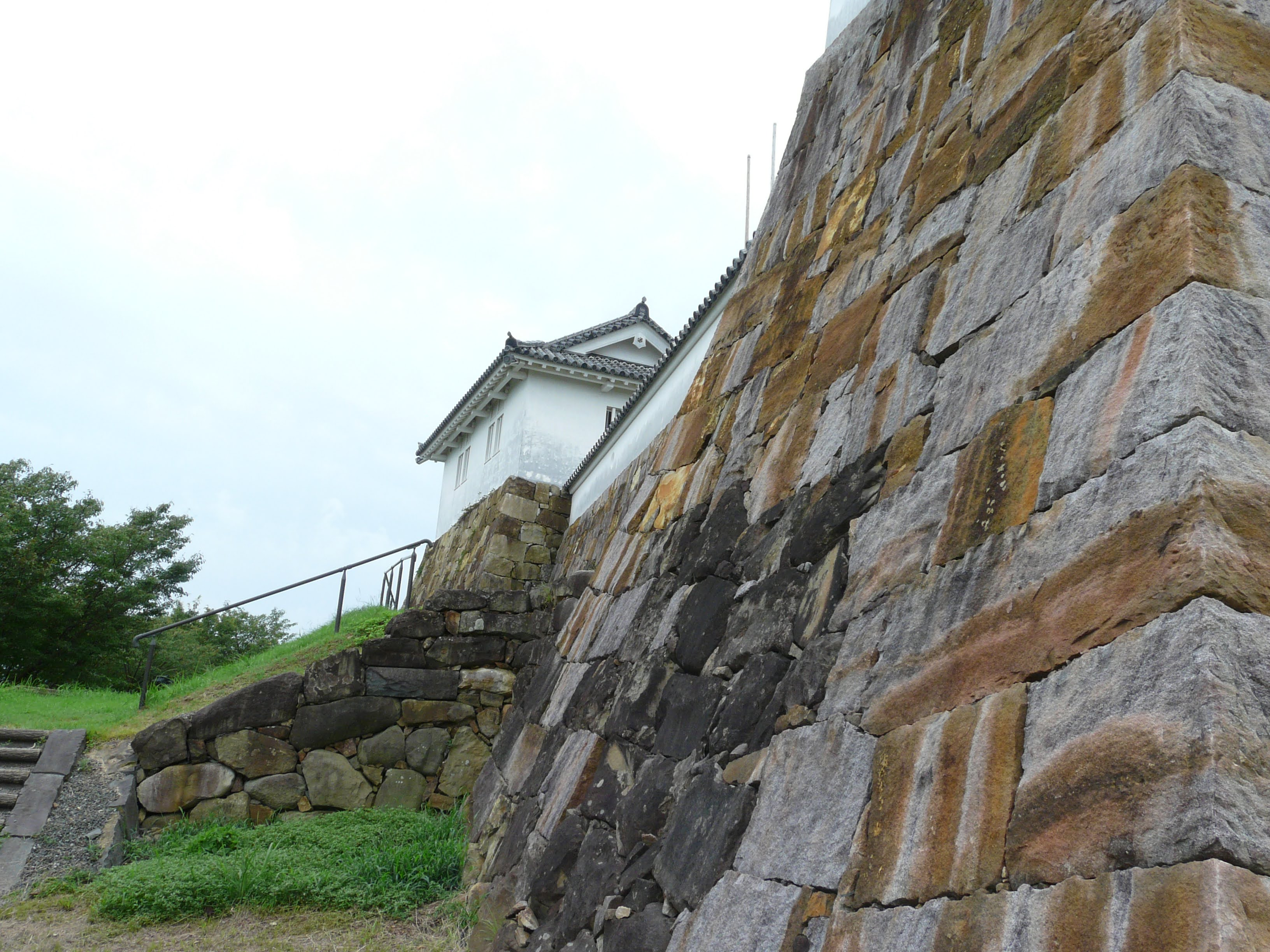
Stone wall of Castle

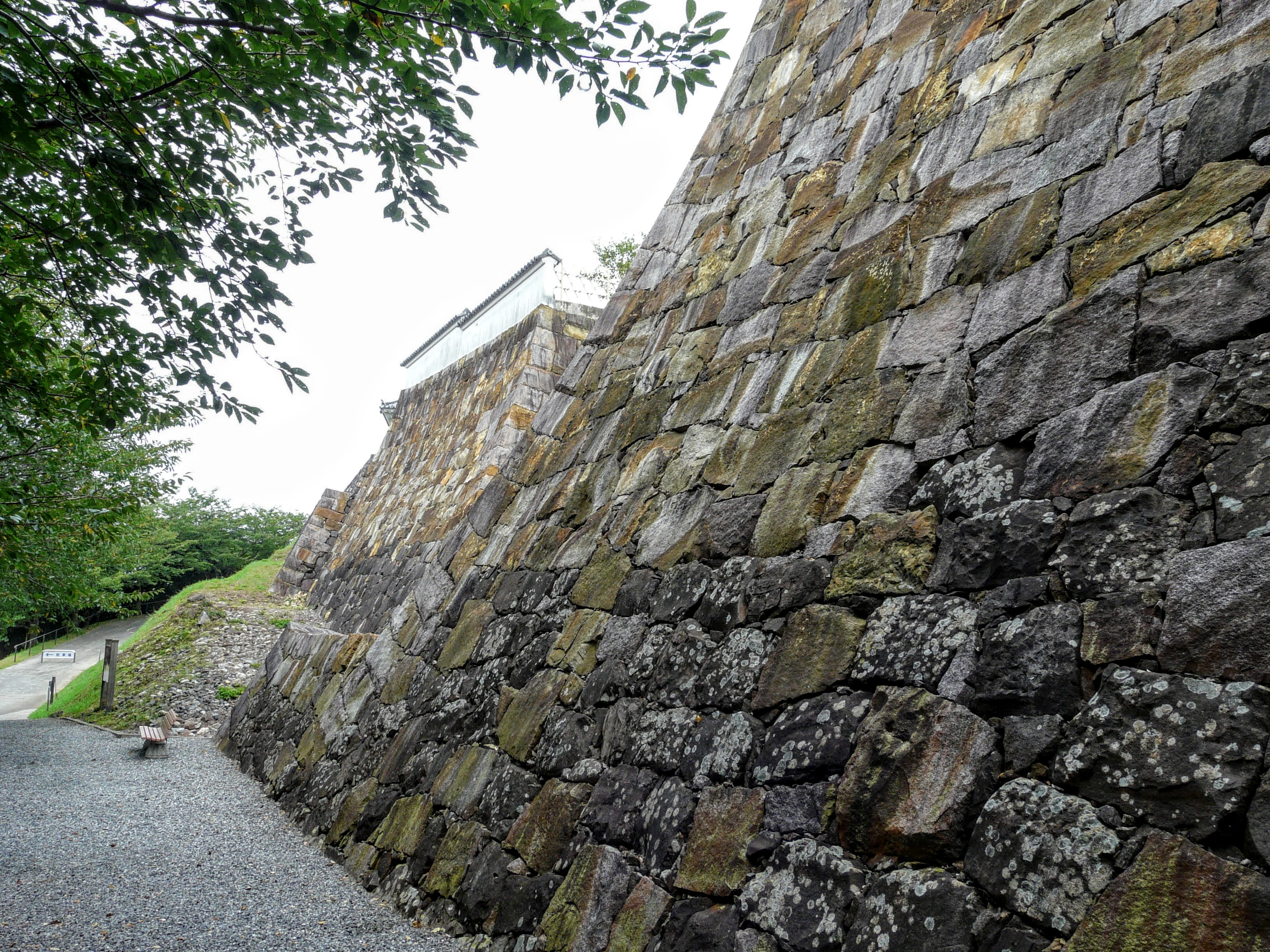
Stone wall of Castle

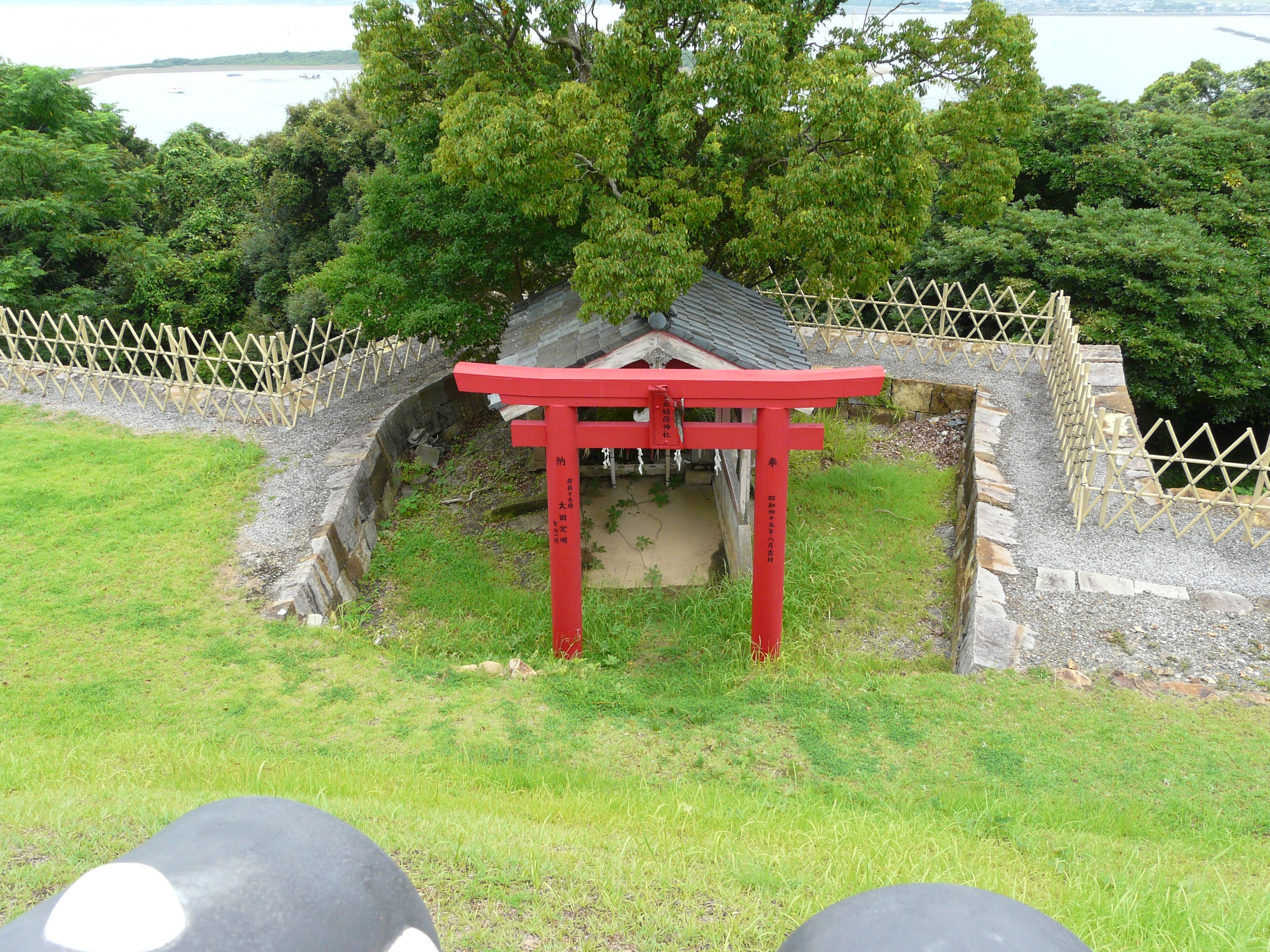
Inari Shrine at Tomioka Castle
