= Michiyo Akaishi =

Japanese manga artist (born 1959)

Michiyo Akaishi 赤石 路代
- Born: October 11, 1959 (age 67) Urawa, Saitama, Japan
- Area: Manga artist
- Awards: 1994 Shogakukan Manga Award for children's manga

Michiyo Akaishi (赤石 路代, Akaishi Michiyo; born October 11, 1959 in Urawa) is a Japanese manga artist. She graduated from Saitama Prefectural Dai-Ichi Girls High School. Akaishi then attended Musashino Art University where she graduated with a degree in commercial plastic model design. In 1979, she won first place in the Shogakukan Shinjin Comic Award contest.

Akaishi's debut story, "Marshmallow Tea wa Hitori de", appeared in the January 1980 issue of Bessatsu Shōjo Comic. Her story "One More Jump" won the 1994 Shogakukan Manga Award for children's manga. She was one of the judges for the 53rd Shogakukan Manga Awards in 2008.

== Works ==
Title	Year	Notes	Refs
Moete Miko (燃えてMIKO, Burning Miko)	1982	Published by Shogakukan FC, 4 volumes	
Alpen Rose	1983–86	Serialized in Ciao; Published by Shogakukan FC, 9 volumes	
6-byou no 9-gatsu (6秒の9月, Of 6 seconds in september)	1984	Published by Shogakukan FC, in Michie of Sentimental Love Vol. 1	
Supākuringu Sutorīto (スパークリング ストリート, Sparkling Street)	1984	Published by Shogakukan FC, in Michie of Sentimental Love Vol. 2; Judy Comic, 1 volume	
Naisho no Half Moon (ja:ないしょのハーフムーン)	1985	Published by Shogakukan FC, published in 6 volumes	
Andāsutadī (アンダースタディー, Understudy)	1985	Published by Shogakukan FC, in Michie of Sentimental Love Vol. 3	
Kyatchi 30-byō (キャッチ30秒, Catch 30 seconds)	1986	Published by Shogakukan FC, part of Michie of Sentimental Love Vol. 4	
Hime 100% (姫100%, Princess 100%; aka "Super Girl")	1987	Published by Shogakukan FC, 4 volumes	
Aruto no A (ja:「あると」の「あ」, "Alto" and "A"; A of Alto)	1989	Published by Shogakukan FC, 4 volumes	
Ten yori mo Hoshi yori mo (天よりも星よりも, Rather than star than heaven)	1989	Published by Shogakukan FC, in 8 volumes	
Fushigi no Rin (ふ・し・ぎのRIN, Rin in wonderland)	1990	Published by Shogakukan FC, 6 volumes	
ja:P.A.: Private Actress	1992	Published by Shogakukan FC, 8 volumes Published by Flower Comics Puchikomi, 9 volumes	
ja:Saint	1992	Published by Kadokawa Shoten Asuka Comics, 5 vols.	
Asutarisuku (アスターリスク, Asterisk)	1992	Published by Shogakukan FC, 2 volumes	
Wan Moa Janpu (ワン・モア・ジャンプ, One More Jump)	1993	1994 Shogakukan Manga Award for children's manga Published by Shogakukan FC, 9 volumes	
News 6:30	1996	Published by Shogakukan paperback, 1 volume; Puchikomi 95/6	
Ame no Niau Heya (雨の似合う部屋, Room look good rain)	1996	Published by Shogakukan FC, 1 volume	
Fearedi wa Namida o Nagasu (フェアレディは涙を流す, Fair Lady shed tears)	1997	Published by Shogakukan paperback, 1 volume	
Yoru ga Owaranai (夜がおわらない, It does not end the night)	1997	Published by Shogakukan paperback, 2 volumes Published by Chao Flower Comics, 3 volumes	
ja:Silent Eye	1997	Published by Shogakukan FC, 6 volumes	
Eien ka mo Shirenai (永遠かもしれない, Perhaps Forever)	1998	Published by Shogakukan FC, in 8 volumes	
Alexander Daiou - Tenjou no Ōkoku (アレクサンダー大王 ~天上の王国~, Alexander the Great – Kingdom)	1998	serialized in Rinka magazine Published by Shogakukan FCα, 2 volumes Published by Flower Comics, 3 volumes	
Sutoroberī Mūn (ストロベリームーン, Strawberry Moon)	2000	Published by Shogakukan FC, 1 volume	
Amakusa 1637	2001–06	Serialized in Flowers; Published by Shogakukan FC, 12 volumes	
Shichou Tōyama Kyōka (市長遠山京香, Mayor Kyoka Toyama)	2001–08	Serialized in Judy magazine Published by Shogakukan FC, 8 volumes Published by Judy Comics, 11 volumes	
Dezāto Sutōmu (デザート・ストーム, Desert Storm)	2001	Published by Shogakukan FC, 1 volume	
Shinema no Teikoku (シネマの帝国, Cinema Empire)	2002	Published by Shogakukan FC, 4 volumes	
ja:Video J	2004	Published by Shogakukan FC, 1 volume Published by Puchikomi Flower Comics, 4 volumes	
Akatsuki no Aria (ja:暁のARIA)	2006–12	Serialized in Monthly Flowers magazine Published by Shogakukan FC, 3 volumes Published by Flower Comics 14 volumes	
Faiyā on Ai (ファイヤーオンアイ, Fire on eye)		Published by Shogakukan FCα, 1 volume	
Michiyo Akaishi The Best Collection (赤石路代 The Best Selection)		Published by Shogakukan FC Specials, 2 volumes	
Keitai ga Ochite ita (ケータイが落ちていた, Mobile had fallen)		Published by Shogakukan FC, 1 volume, Sebun Pīsu (セブンピース, Seven Piece); Published in Flower Comics, 2 volumes	
Doyōbi ni wa kitto ikukara (tanhenshū) (土曜日にはきっと行くから(短編集, Surely from going (short stories))		Published by Shogakukan paperback, 1 volume	
Ashita Watashi ni Korosareru (明日・わたしに・殺される)		Novel, Published by Shogakukan palette paperback	
Naoya L-R		Novel, Published by Shogakukan paperback	
Mitsurugi (ミツルギ); Illustrations for novel authored by Junki Takegami;,		Published by Shogakukan palette paperback	
Ten no Shinwachi no Eien (天の神話地の永遠, Eternal Heaven of Mythology Land)		Published by Akita Shoten Bonita Comics, 4 volumes Published Bonita Comics, 10 volumes	
Angel Trumpet (エンジェル・トランペット)		Published in Flower Comics alpha, 7 volumes	
