= Pukupuku Natural Circular Notice =

Japanese manga series

ぷくぷく天然かいらんばん (Pukupuku Tennen Kairanban)
- Manga
- Written by: Sayuri Tatsuyama
- Published by: Shogakukan
- Magazine: Ciao
- Original run: 1999 – 2005
- Volumes: 10

Pukupuku Natural Circular Notice (ぷくぷく天然かいらんばん, Pukupuku Tennen Kairanban) is a shōjo manga by Sayuri Tatsuyama (creator of Happy Happy Clover). It was published by Shogakukan in the magazine Ciao from 1999 to 2005 and collected in ten tankōbon volumes. In 2002, it won the Shogakukan Manga Award for children's manga. The author based the series on her own pet.

== Game ==
- Available: March 26, 2004
- Model: Game Boy Advance
