= Kings of My Love =

Japanese manga series by Chitose Yagami

オレ様キングダム (Oresama Kingdom)
- Genre: Romance
- Manga

Oresama Kingdom
- Written by: Chitose Yagami
- Published by: Shogakukan
- Magazine: ChuChu, Ciao
- Original run: October 1, 2009 – June 3, 2014
- Volumes: 12
- Original video animation
- Directed by: Miho Iraho, Katsumi Ono (episode 1 & 2)
- Music by: Tenten, E. Redford
- Studio: SynergySP
- Released: February 2011 – May 2013
- Runtime: 11 minutes
- Episodes: 14
- Video game

Oresama Kingdom Koi mo Manga mo Debut o Mezase! Dokidoki Love Lesson
- Developer: Netchubiyori
- Publisher: Bandai Namco Games
- Genre: Adventure
- Platform: Nintendo DS
- Released: November 23, 2011

Kings of My Love (オレ様キングダム, Oresama Kingudamu; lit. 'My Kingdom') is a shōjo manga by Chitose Yagami. The manga was serialized in Ciao magazine, published by Shogakukan in Japan. It was adapted into a Nintendo DS game and a fourteen episode OVA.

== Plot ==
Nono Nonohara is a high school girl who is a manga artist whose inspiration comes from three handsome boys of the school: Shun Kurosawa, Shinogu Hakuba, and Hikaru Akagi. As her life, as a manga artist continues, Nono develops stronger feelings towards the amazing Kurosawa.

== Characters ==
- Nono Nonohara (野々原 のの, Nonohara Nono) is a high school girl that writes comic books.
- Shun Kurosawa (黒澤 瞬, Kurosawa Shun) is the high school boy that Nono develops feelings for. He rarely shows emotion but it is shown that he also likes Nono.
- Shinogu Hakuba (白馬 凌, Hakuba Shingoku)
- Hikaru Akagi (赤城 輝, Akagi Hikaru)
- Miwa Kurosawa (黒澤 美和, Kurosawa Miwa) is a famous actress who Shun's older sister.

== Media ==
=== Manga ===
Kings of My Love ran in the manga magazine Ciao since October 1, 2009, and ended on June 3, 2014. There are twelve bound volumes in total. A sequel, Kings of My Love DX, started in Ciao DX on March 19, 2020. One volume was published in March 2021.

No.	Japanese release date	Japanese ISBN
1	October 1, 2009	978-4-09-132704-8
2	April 1, 2010	978-4-09-133253-0
3	November 1, 2010	978-4-09-133437-4
4	April 1, 2011	978-4-09-133770-2
5	September 1, 2011	978-4-09-134096-2
6	February 1, 2012	978-4-09-134240-9
7	August 1, 2012	978-4-09-134569-1
8	November 30, 2012	978-4-09-134775-6
9	May 31, 2013	978-4-09-135275-0
10	October 1, 2013	978-4-09-135595-9
11	February 27, 2014	978-4-09-135730-4
12	July 25, 2014	978-4-09-136277-3
