= Uesugi-kun Wants to Quit Being a Girl =

Japanese manga series

- First tankōbon volume cover

上杉くんは女の子をやめたい (Uesugi-kun wa Onnanoko o Yametai)
- Genre: Romantic comedy; Slice of life; Supernatural
- Manga
- Written by: Yū Yabūchi
- Published by: Shogakukan
- English publisher: NA: Seven Seas Entertainment
- Imprint: Ciao Comics
- Magazine: Ciao Plus
- Original run: May 4, 2024 – present
- Volumes: 5

Uesugi-kun Wants to Quit Being a Girl (上杉くんは女の子をやめたい, Uesugi-kun wa Onnanoko o Yametai) is a Japanese manga series written and illustrated by Yū Yabūchi. It began serialization on Shogakukan's Ciao Plus website in May 2024.

== Plot ==
Keisuke Uesugi has a complex owing to his small frame, appearance, and performance in school, especially in comparison with his friend Eito Yaemura. When he overhears his childhood friend and crush Noel say "Wouldn't it be better if Uesugi was a girl?", he suddenly feels disappointed about not meeting her expectations. He later makes a prayer at a shrine in order to win Noel over, however due to a misunderstanding, the prayer is answered, but he is transformed into a girl. A love triangle between the newly-transformed Uesugi, Eito, and Noel begins.

== Production ==
Yabūchi was encouraged from her assistants to fit the concept into a "boy disguised as girl" that framed the series around cosplay and makeup. Initially, she tried to visualize Uesugi, but felt uncertain because the idea did not come together immediately. After one-month-and-a-half, Yabūchi clarified that it was not necessarily only about women's clothes, but about allowing Uesugi to explore what felt possible within it. She leaned toward a "TS" angle and described these choices as becoming clearer through personal recognition of the focus on designs.

== Publication ==
Written and illustrated by Yū Yabūchi, Uesugi-kun Wants to Quit Being a Girl began serialization on Shogakukan's Ciao Plus manga website on May 4, 2024. Its chapters have been compiled into five tankōbon volumes as of May 2026.

In November 2025, Seven Seas Entertainment announced that they had licensed the series for English publication, with the first volume set to release in August 2026.

No.	Original release date	Original ISBN	North American release date	North American ISBN
1	October 24, 2024	978-4-09-872820-6	September 22, 2026	979-8-89765-949-4
Chapters 1–6; Bonus: "Don't Make Me Put on a Sailor Uniform"; Extra: "Hair Is a Woman's Life?"; Bonus: "Eito's Daily Routine"
2	April 25, 2025	978-4-09-873052-0	November 17, 2026	979-8-89765-950-0
3	July 25, 2025	978-4-09-873053-7	February 16, 2027	979-8-89765-951-7
4	December 25, 2025	978-4-09-873273-9	June 15, 2027	979-8-90209-077-9
5	May 26, 2026	978-4-09-873444-3	—	—

== Reception ==
The series, alongside Sō Desu, Watashi ga Biyō Baka Desu. Goku Tsuya and Sorairo Shingyō, was ranked eighteenth in the 2026 edition of Takarajimasha's Kono Manga ga Sugoi! guidebook's list of the best manga for female readers.
