= The Hoopers =

Japanese pop group

THE HOOPERS
- The Hoopers. From left to right: Makoto, Haruki, Sena, Mirai, Cecil and Tsubasa

Background information
- Origin: Japan
- Genres: J-pop
- Years active: May 2, 2014–January 25, 2019
- Labels: Universal Music Japan
- Members: Mirai; Sena; Haruki; Cecil; Lee; Noa
- Past members: Tsubasa; Yuhi; Mizuki; Makoto
- Website: thehoopers.jp

The Hoopers, stylized in all caps, was an all-female Japanese pop group who dress in masculine clothing inspired by Takarazuka Revue. The group was signed to Universal Music Japan.

The band was formed after twelve of the five thousand participants of Fudanjuku's 'Next Generation Audition' were selected. Seven of the chosen participants went on to form The Hoopers, and the remaining five formed Axell.

The Hoopers debuted on March 4, 2015, with their single "Itoshi Koishi Kimi Koishi" (イトシコイシ君恋シ). Their eighth member Cecil (who is also an Axell member) was introduced on their single "Passionate Love" as a permanent member. Later in 2015 they held the Ikemen Audition, where they selected 6 people to become members of Little Hoop (they are described as apprentice members for The Hoopers). Lee of AXELL and Noa of Little Hoop joined the group as new members on June 25, 2017, and on July 28, 2017, They released their new single "Shamrock".

They disbanded on January 25, 2019, with a concert at Kanda Myojin Hall.

== History ==
Japanese idol group Fudanjuku held an audition for juniors. Of the approximately 5,000 participants, 12 were selected as winners, with 7 to form The Hoopers and the remaining 5 to form another group, Axell.

The winners, both those who would become The Hoopers and Axell, appeared as backup dancers on March 30, 2014 for Fudanjuku's performance at Nakano Sunplaza. While this was after they were selected from the audition, they were not introduced to the audience as it was before for official debut. They made their debut on May 2, 2014 when they were unveiled on the internet TV show Ikesuta. They performed their first open-air performance on May 5 in Yoyogi Park.

Universal Sigma released their first single, Itoshi Koishi Kimi Koishi (イトシコイシ君恋シ), on March 4, 2015. In April, the Hoopers hosted two abnormal sponsor programmes that started at the same time to mark one month after their major debut. On July 6, they announced on their official blog that Yuhi would be taking time off from the band due to poor health and that during that time Axell member Cecil would be substituting for her.

The band announced on September 29, 2015 on their weekly show The Hooper no Harajuku Kyun Kyun Station (THE HOOPERSの原宿キュン♡キュンSTATION) that they would be having their first solo performance, that Yuhi would be making her return to the band at the performance, and that Cecil would officially be joining the band, while also remaining in Axell, bringing the band to 8 members. On October 17, 24, and 31, they visited school festivals in their Hoopers o Oikakete: Kyun Kyun Purojekuto (Sukūru-hen) (HOOPERSを追いかけて〜キュンキュン❤プロジェクト(スクール編)). Their first solo performance was held on November 15 at the live house Niconico-fāre with all 8 members, including Yuhi who had been on leave since July and Cecil who had become an official member after substituting for Yuhi.

On May 4, 2017, Yuhi and Mizuki officially left the group after a leaving ceremony was held for them at a tour finale in Tokyo. At the ceremoney, the other members of the band surprised the two leaving members with a new song, "Life is Beautiful", made for them which they performed to a video accompaniment. On June 24, the Hoopers performed live at Niconico-fāre where they announced their new members, Lee (also a member of Axell) and Noa (formerly of Little Hoop). They released their new single, "Shamrock" on July 28.

A leaving ceremony was held for Makoto on February 10, 2018 during their performance, The Hoopers Kako Saichō Live!: Makoto Sotsugyō Kōen (ザ・フーパーズ 過去最長LIVE!〜麻琴卒業公演〜), at Niconico-fāre. On December 6, it was announced on a Showroom stream that there would be a drastic change to the ikemen girls project that is the Hoopers and that their final solo performance would be on January 25, 2019, after which the members would appear in different projects. It was also announce that Tsubasa would retire from the project after this performance.

On January 25, 2019, the band held their last performance, Final Fantasia: Ai no Zenbu, for You! (FINAL FANTASIA〜愛の全部、For You!) at Kanda Myoujin Hall in Tokyo. Tsubasa retired and the Hoopers disbanded at the performance. Later on March 1, it was announced that they would begin a new project in the form of the male-dressing all-female idol group dreamBoat.

== Members ==
Japanese Name	English Name	Birthday	Birthplace	Role	Remarks
未来	Mirai	June 6, 1994	Tokyo	Center; Vocal Leader	
星波	Sena	September 1, 1995	Kanagawa Prefecture	MC, Acting, Acrobatics	Previous stage names: Mitsuhashi Nanami, Yah (of Secret Girls)
陽稀	Haruki	November 26, 1994	Aichi Prefecture	Fashion Influencer	Model for digital fashion magazine Kera
千知	Cecil	February 7, 1997	Kyoto	Cosplay	Joined November 15, 2015; Concurrent as Axell member
Lee	Lee	October 9, 1998	Chiba Prefecture	Dance	Joined June 24, 2017; Concurrent as Axell Member
乃愛	Noa	March 22, 2000	Kochi Prefecture	Social media	Joined June 24, 2017

=== Past Members ===
Name	Name	Birthday	Birthplace	Role	Remarks	Departure
泉貴	Mizuki	April 27, 1992	Tokyo	Lover	Mizukissu	Mizuki officially left the group on May 4, 2017 and retired from idol life
佑妃	Yuhi	March 8, 1994	Saga Prefecture	Sub leader and acrobat		Yuhi officially left the group on May 4, 2017 for health reasons, after previously struggling with her health in 2015
麻琴	Makoto	May 21, 1991	Kanagawa Prefecture	THE HOOPERS' Leader; Acrobatics		Makoto officially left the group on February 10, 2018
つばさ	Tsubasa	May 18, 1994	Tokyo	Rap		Tsubasa officially left the group on January 25, 2019

=== Little Hoop ===
Name	Name	Birthday	Age	Birthplace	Specialty
夏向	Kanata	July 9, 1996	21	Chiba Prefecture	Theatre, Dance
海	Kai	July 13, 1999	18	Gunma Prefecture	Rondato, Cartwheels
麗	Rei	March 26, 1999	19	Tokyo	Guitar
梨桜	Rio	March 16, 2002	16	Yamanashi Prefecture	Drum

== Discography ==
With ranking in the Oricon Singles Chart

Itoshi Koishi Kimi Koishi (イトシコイシ君恋シ) (Editions: Initial Limited Editions A, B, C, and Standard Edition)

- Released: 2015-03-04
- Format: CD+DVD (Only included with Editions A and B)
- Tracks: "Itoshi Koishi Kimi Koishi (イトシコイシ君恋シ)", "Mikansei na Chizu (未完成な地図)", "Itoshi Koishi Kimi Koishi (Instrumental)", "Mikansei na Chizu (Instrumental)"
- Bonus tracks: "Karakuri Piero (からくりピエロ)" (Only in standard edition)

Ame o oikakete (雨を追いかけて) (Editions: Initial Limited Editions A, B, C, and Standard Edition)

- Released: 2015-06-03
- Format: CD+DVD (Only included with Editions A and B)
- Tracks: Ame o oikakete ("雨を追いかけて"), Hanasanai yo ("離さないよ"), "Ame o oikakete (Instrumental)", "Hanasanai yo (Instrumental)"
- Bonus tracks: "Mr. Music" (Only in Standard Edition)

GO! GO! Dance ga Tomaranai (GO!GO!ダンスが止まらナイ) (Editions: Initial Editions A, B, C, and Standard Edition)

- Released: 2015-08-26
- Format: CD+DVD (Only included with Editions A and B)
- Tracks: "GO! GO! Dance ga Tomaranai ("GO!GO!ダンスが止まらナイ"), "DIAMOND", "GO! GO! Dance ga Tomaranai (Instrumental)", "DIAMOND (Instrumental)"
- Bonus tracks: "Fire◎Flower" (Only in Standard Edition)

=== Single ===
Release date	Title	Romanized Title	Oricon Weekly Single Chart
March 4, 2015	イトシコイシ君恋シ	Itoshi Koishi Kimi Koishi	#16
June 3, 2015	雨を追いかけて	Ame wo Oikakete	#12
August 26, 2015	GO!GO!ダンスが止まらナイ	GO! GO! Dance ga Tomaranai	#14
December 16, 2015	情熱は枯葉のように	Jōnetsu wa Kareha no Yō ni	#6
May 31, 2016	ラブハンター	Love Hunter	#8
February 22, 2017	シロツメクサ	Shirotsumekusa	#13
August 9, 2017	SHAMROCK	SHAMROCK	#10
January 24, 2018	ヴァンパイアキス	Vampire Kiss	#5
June 27, 2018	ジュエルの鼓動が聴こえるか?	Jewel no Kodō ga Kikoeru ka?	#5

=== Album ===
Release date	Title	Oricon Weekly Album Chart
September 28, 2016	FANTASIA	#15
November 28, 2018	FANTASIC SHOW	#9
