= Hiromu Shinozuka =

Japanese manga artist

Hiromu Shinozuka 篠塚 ひろむ
- Born: March 27, 1979 (age 47) Fukuoka, Japan
- Area: Manga artist
- Awards: Kodansha Manga Award for children's manga - Mirmo; Shogakukan Manga Award for children's manga - Mirmo

Hiromu Shinozuka (篠塚 ひろむ; born March 27, 1979) is a Japanese manga artist. She debuted with Takkyu Shōjo in 1999, and writes for Ciao magazine. Her manga Mirmo! received the Kodansha Manga Award for children's manga in 2003 and the Shogakukan Manga Award for children's manga in 2004, and there is a 172-episode anime adaptation as well.

== Selected works ==
- Chenge!
- Mirmo!
- Koisuru purin
- Chibi Devi!
- PriPri Chi-chan!!
