= Fall in Love Like a Comic! =

Japanese manga

- Cover of the first manga volume

まんがみたいな恋したいっ! (Manga Mitaina Koishitai!)
- Genre: Romantic comedy
- Manga
- Written by: Chitose Yagami
- Published by: Shogakukan
- English publisher: NA: Viz Media
- Magazine: Ciao
- Original run: August 2002 – October 2002
- Volumes: 2
- Manga

Zoku Manga Mitaina Koi Shitai!
- Written by: Chitose Yagami
- Published by: Shogakukan
- English publisher: NA: Viz Media
- Magazine: ChuChu, Ciao
- Original run: 2003 – 2004
- Volumes: 1

Fall in Love Like a Comic! (まんがみたいな恋したいっ!, Manga Mitaina Koishitai!) is a shōjo manga by Chitose Yagami. It was serialized in a magazine, published by Shogakukan in Japan. The series has been in North America by Viz Media and was released on October 2, 2007. The sequel, Zoku Manga Mitaina Koi Shitai! (続まんがみたいな恋したいっ!), was shown on October 1, 2004, also published by Shogakukan, and it was released in English under the title Fall in Love Like a Comic! vol. 2 on January 1, 2008, again by Viz Media.

The chapters in Zoku Manga Mitaina Koi Shitai (released in English under the title Fall in Love Like a Comic! vol. 2) were stand alone one-shots involving the characters from Manga Mitaina Koi Shitai and were serialized at irregular intervals in the manga magazines ChuChu and Ciao.

A preview of the first chapter was included in the September 2007 issue of Shojo Beat magazine.

== Plot ==
The story centers around the relationship between Rena and Tomoya. Rena is a high school student and also a popular manga artist. While drawing love scenes, she bumps into the popular boy Tomoya. She quickly runs away from him but forgets her draft in the process. But when her publisher mentions that she doesn't put enough feeling into her works, she decides that she wants to improve her manga artist career by getting some hands-on experience in love. She goes back to find her work and discovers that Tomoya now knows she is a manga artist. While there, she asks him to become her boyfriend to help her with her manga. Tomoya agrees and a few days later a jealous girl tries to hurt Rena when Tomoya takes her out for a date. He rescues her and takes her to his house. Later on, Rena sees him with another girl and thinks Tomoya doesn't want to be her boyfriend anymore, not realizing that the girl is his older sister. She starts avoiding him and soon Tomoya is becoming annoyed. A few days later he demands to know what happened. She then publicly professes her love to him. A few weeks after that, one of Rena's manga has the opportunity to be a drama on television. Her manager asks Rena to ask Tomoya about being an actor in the movie. He agrees to have a look, and ends up securing the role. In the middle of the filming, Rena becomes upset that Tomoya is being intimate with another girl, even though it's only acting. Tomoya assures her that he will never leave her.

A few months later, Rena and Tomoya go on a trip together. Rena starts pressuring Tomoya about sex, but Tomoya refuses her pleads rather coldly. Later he goes to her room and assures her that he will have sex with her one day in the future. After a few weeks, Rena tries calling Tomoya, only to hear a girl on the phone saying she is going to take a shower with Tomoya. Worried, Rena rushes over to Tomoya's house. There she meets Shiori, a relative of Tomoya. Shiori says that she will marry Tomoya in the future, which makes Rena extremely jealous. When Rena brings up the subject of Tomoya and her next date, Tomoya agrees to Shiori's pleading to come along. Rena objects to this loudly and then runs home. The next day Tomoya and Rena go on their date as planned, but Shiori cries when she is ignored. When Tomoya tries to calm her down, Shiori's father arrives and invites Shiori to go home with him. After some persuading from Tomoya, Shiori leaves with her father. A few days after that incident, Rena's parents get her a tutor who turns out to be Tomoya's ex-girlfriend. Rena soon becomes jealous and when Tomoya tries to calm her down, she shoves him away and runs off. Later Tomoya visits her and brings her to a chapel where he proposes to her. Rena says yes and they get married in the chapel, bringing the story to an end. There is also a chapter featuring them as adults with children.

== Characters ==
Rena Sakura
The main protagonist of the story. She has a secret that she is a professional manga artist who draws shōjo manga. After an accident at school, Tomoya finds out her secret, and remembering some advice from her editor, she asked him for a date so that she could learn more and improve her work. However, throughout the series, she is easily embarrassed by having any contact with boys (especially Tomoya) and often turns either extremely red or melts into goo. Later on, she falls in love with Tomoya although she questions their relationship. She becomes jealous when Tomoya shoots a kissing scene with an actress (who is also a fan of Rena's works). Rena is very shy toward boys but enjoys the help. In the future, Rena marries Tomoya and they have a son named Hiroki.
Tomoya Okita
Rena's boyfriend and the one she shared her first kiss with. He is extremely popular at school with the girls, and even though many have asked him out, his reply was always no. It is hinted that his older sister, who is a famous manga artist, influenced his personality. When Rena asked him why he didn't have a girlfriend, this was his reply: "I'm only going to date someone I'm interested in." The truth was that he was talking about Rena. Tomoya became mad when Rena told him that he seems to be a main hero of a shōjo manga because he wants her to see him as a real person. He also confesses his love to Rena. In the future, Tomoya marries Rena and they have a son named Hiroki.

Yun

Rena's closest friend who knows about her secret and supports her. She usually pushes Rena and is supportive of Rena's relationship with Tomoya. Yun always cares for Rena and has her best interest in mind, often offering Rena advice when needed. In the future, Yun marries Sunahara and they have a daughter named Sana.
Sunahara
Sunhara is one of Tomoya's friends. He is calm and does not talk a lot in the manga. In the future, Sunahara marries Yun and they have a daughter named Sana.
Yamase
A childhood friend of Tomoya who is the reason why Rena ran accidentally into Tomoya. He usually questions the relationship between Rena and Tomoya. At their school, he is actually the second most popular boy after Tomoya. In the future chapter, Yamase is working at a kindergarten, which Hiroki and Sana attend.

== Media ==
=== Volume listing ===
No.	Original release date	Original ISBN	English release date	English ISBN
1	December 19, 2002	978-4091381521	October 2, 2007	1-4215-1373-0
Chapter 1; Chapter 2; Chapter 3; In Love Like a Comic; Tomoya Okita: A Boy Like in Comics!; Bonus Story: Magical Project
2	October 1, 2004	978-4091381576	January 1, 2008	1-4215-1374-9
Heartthrob Vacation; A Small Crush; Happy Ending; One More Fall in Love Like a Comic: Hiroki's Secret; Bonus Story: Nana and Mickey's Heart-Racing Manga Lesson; Bonus Story: Bewildered Princess

== Reception ==
Jason Thompson, writing for the appendix to Manga: The Complete Guide, praised the lead character for being "one of the all-too-few really eager careerwomen in shojo manga for this age group".
