= The Magic of Chocolate =

Japanese manga series and its adaptations

- Cover of the first volume featuring Chocolat Aikawa

ショコラの魔法 (Shokora no Mahō)
- Genre: Dark fantasy
- Manga
- Written by: Rino Mizuho
- Published by: Shogakukan
- English publisher: SEA: Shogakukan Asia
- Imprint: Ciao Horror Comics
- Magazine: Ciao; Ciao DX
- Original run: September 3, 2008 – present
- Volumes: 24
- Original video animation
- Directed by: Shinichiro Kimura
- Written by: Michiko Yokote; Tatsuto Higuchi; Kenichi Yamashita
- Music by: tenten
- Studio: SynergySP
- Released: March 3, 2011 – December 28, 2012
- Runtime: 11–16 minutes
- Episodes: 13
- Live-action film
- Directed by: Tomonobu Morikawa
- Produced by: Shinya Furugori; Kana Ohtsubo
- Written by: Tatsuya Kanazawa
- Studio: Film
- Released: June 18, 2021
- Runtime: 81 minutes
- icon

The Magic of Chocolate (Japanese: ショコラの魔法, Hepburn: Shokora no Mahō) is a Japanese dark fantasy manga series written and illustrated by Rino Mizuho. It has been serialized in the monthly shōjo manga magazine Ciao and its sister magazine, Ciao DX, since September 2008.

A 13-episode original video animation produced by SynergySP was released between 2011 and 2012, while a live-action film adaptation was released to Japanese theatres in 2021.

In 2021, The Magic of Chocolate won the 66th Shogakukan Manga Award in the children's category.

== Synopsis ==
The Magic of Chocolate is a series focusing on Chocolat Aikawa, the owner of a chocolaterie called Chocolat Noir, located deep in the forest. She sells chocolates that can grant wishes when consumed. However, the chocolates come at a price; as payment, Chocolat will take something precious to the customer. Many of her customers have concerns or grievances they wish to remedy with the chocolates, though some aim to abuse the chocolates' magic for nefarious purposes; Chocolat will curse those who do so to "plunge into the depths of darkness," resulting in often bizarre and ironic retributions.

== Characters ==
Chocolat Aikawa (哀川ショコラ, Aikawa Shokora)
Voiced by: Yukana
An emotionally stoic chocolatier, and owner of the Chocolat Noir. She is always seen dressed in gothic lolita.
Cacao Theobroma (カカオ・テオブロマ, Kakao Teoburoma)
Voiced by: Kōki Miyata
A chocolate devil who was summoned by Chocolat's father, Shūga, and lives together with her. He is usually seen in the form of a black cat.

== Media ==
=== Manga ===
The Magic of Chocolate is written and illustrated by Rino Mizuho. It has been serialized irregularly in the monthly magazine Ciao and its sister magazine, Ciao DX, since September 3, 2008. Shogakukan has collected its chapters into individual tankōbon volumes, under the Ciao Horror Comics imprint. The first volume was released on July 1, 2009. As of March 26, 2024, 24 volumes have been released.

Instead of being ordered numerically, each volume is named according to the English alphabet. From October 11 to November 1, 2013, columnist Bourbon Kobayashi held a contest on Twitter for contestants to guess the subtitle of the then-upcoming volume 10, slated to begin with the letter "J." Mizuho herself judged the results, with the prizes awarded to the first three people who were able to answer correctly, as well as special jury awards such as the "Nice Silly Answer Award" and the "Cool & Sweet Award."

The series is licensed for Southeast Asian distribution in English by Shogakukan Asia.

==== Volumes ====
No.	Title	Japanese release date	Japanese ISBN
1	Shokora no Mahō: Almond Kiss (ショコラの魔法〜almond kiss〜)	July 1, 2009	978-4-09-132642-3
2	Shokora no Mahō: Bitter Sweet (ショコラの魔法〜bitter sweet〜)	March 1, 2010	978-4-09-132884-7
3	Shokora no Mahō: Creamy Sugar (ショコラの魔法〜creamy sugar〜)	November 29, 2010	978-4-09-133445-9
4	Shokora no Mahō: Dark Spice (ショコラの魔法〜dark spice〜)	April 1, 2011	978-4-09-133774-0
5	Shokora no Mahō: Evil Essence (ショコラの魔法〜evil essence〜)	November 1, 2011	978-4-09-134088-7
6	Shokora no Mahō: Fruity Flavor (ショコラの魔法〜fruity flavor〜)	March 1, 2012	978-4-09-134088-7
7	Shokora no Mahō: Guilty Crunch (ショコラの魔法〜guilty crunch〜)	August 1, 2012	978-4-09-159119-7
8	Shokora no Mahō: Honey Blood (ショコラの魔法〜honey blood〜)	November 30, 2012	978-4-09-134827-2
9	Shokora no Mahō: Ice Shadow (ショコラの魔法〜ice shadow〜)	July 26, 2013	978-4-09-135547-8; 978-4-09-159157-9 (LE)
10	Shokora no Mahō: Jewel Syrup (ショコラの魔法〜jewel syrup〜)	January 31, 2014	978-4-09-135720-5
11	Shokora no Mahō: Knocking Egg (ショコラの魔法〜knocking egg〜)	July 1, 2014	978-4-09-136268-1
12	Shokora no Mahō: Love Flake (ショコラの魔法〜love flake〜)	October 30, 2014	978-4-09-136608-5
13	Shokora no Mahō: Melty Night (ショコラの魔法〜melty night〜)	September 2, 2015	978-4-09-137627-5
14	Shokora no Mahō: Nutty Carnival (ショコラの魔法〜nutty carnival〜)	April 28, 2016	978-4-09-138326-6
15	Shokora no Mahō: Odd Cake (ショコラの魔法〜odd cake〜)	November 1, 2016	978-4-09-139456-9
16	Shokora no Mahō: Phantom Decoration (ショコラの魔法〜phantom decoration〜)	September 1, 2017	978-4-09-870199-5
17	Shokora no Mahō: Queen Candy (ショコラの魔法〜queen candy〜)	August 2, 2018	978-4-09-870592-4
18	Shokora no Mahō: Romantic Flambe (ショコラの魔法〜romantic flambe〜)	December 29, 2019	978-4-09-870736-2
19	Shokora no Mahō: Salty Leaf (ショコラの魔法〜salty leaf〜)	May 1, 2020	978-4-09-871030-0
20	Shokora no Mahō: Tricky Beans (ショコラの魔法〜tricky beans〜)	July 31, 2020	978-4-09-871092-8
21	Shokora no Mahō: Under Glace (ショコラの魔法〜under glace〜)	April 28, 2021	978-4-09-871362-2
22	Shokora no Mahō: Vivid Berry (ショコラの魔法〜vivid berry〜)	December 26, 2022	978-4-09-871881-8
23	Shokora no Mahō: Witch Sand (ショコラの魔法〜witch sand〜)	November 24, 2023	978-4-09-872461-1
24	Shokora no Mahō: X-ing Pie (ショコラの魔法〜x-ing pie〜)	March 26, 2024	978-4-09-872627-1

==== Anthologies ====
No.	Title	Original release date	English release date
1	The Magic of Chocolate: Premium Collection 1 The Magic of Chocolate: Premium Collection 2 Shokora no Mahō: Puremiamu Korekushon (ショコラの魔法～プレミアムコレクション～)	June 1, 2015; 978-4-09-137408-0	February 21, 2019; 978-9-8111-6806-2
"Stick Chocolate: Decision Maker" (スティックチョコレート 決断のしるべ, Sutikku Chokorēto: Ketsudan no Shirube); "Chocolate Macaron: Frozen Time" (チョコレートマカロン 凍てついた時間, Chokorēto Makaron: Itetsuita Toki); "Rocher: The Two Chocolatiers" (ロシエ 二人のショコラティエ, Roshie: Futari no Shokoratie); "Mendiant: Shape of Life" (マンディアン 命のカタチ, Mandian: Inochi no Katachi); "Muscadine: Vines of Sin" (ミュスカディーヌ 罪の蔓, Myusukadīnu: Tsumi no Tsuru); "Cocoa Nibs: Beyond Bitterness" (カカオニブ 苦みの彼方, Kakao Nibu: Nigami no Kanata); "Chocolate Ballet: Dance of Death" (ショコラ・バレエ 死の舞踏, Shokora Barē: Shi no Futō)
2	The Magic of Chocolate: Tears Collection; Shokora no Mahō: Tiāzu Korekushon (ショコラの魔法～ティアーズコレクション～)	August 29, 2017; 978-4-09-870044-8	—

=== Original video animation ===
An original video animation (OVA) adaptation was announced on the wrap-around band released with volume 3 on November 29, 2010. The episodes were distributed through the Ciao Ciao TV! DVD discs included in the monthly magazine Ciao, starting with the April 2011 issue; the final episode was published with the February 2013 issue. All episodes were made available to watch on Ciao's official YouTube channel in 2021.

No.	Title	Directed by	Written by	Original release date
1	"Meringue au Chocolat: Melody of Sadness, Part 1"; Transliteration: "Murangu O Shokora: Kanashimi no Senritsu Zenpen" (Japanese: ムラング・オ・ショコラ 〜悲しみの旋律〜 前編)	Shinichiro Kimura	Hiroko Fukuda	February 3, 2011
2	"Meringue au Chocolat: Melody of Sadness, Part 2"; Transliteration: "Murangu O Shokora: Kanashimi no Senritsu Kōhen" (Japanese: ムラング・オ・ショコラ 〜悲しみの旋律〜 後編)	Shinichiro Kimura	Hiroko Fukuda	March 3, 2011
3	"Tartelette: Silent Rain"; Transliteration: "Tarutoretto: Seijaku no Ame" (Japanese: タルトレット 〜静寂の雨〜)	Shinichiro Kimura	Tomoko Konparu	July 2, 2011
4	"Parfait: Autumn Day Melancholy"; Transliteration: "Parufe: Aki no Hi no Yūtsu" (Japanese: パルフェ 〜秋の日の憂鬱〜)	Shinichiro Kimura	Tomoko Konparu	September 3, 2011
5	"White Macaron: Flames of Regret"; Transliteration: "Howaito Makaron: Kōkai no Honō" (Japanese: ホワイトマカロン 〜後悔の炎〜)	Shinichiro Kimura	Tomoko Konparu	October 3, 2011
6	"Red Cherry Chocolate: Memory of a Ghost"; Transliteration: "Reddo Cherī Chokorēto: Rei no Kioku" (Japanese: レッドチェリーチョコレート 〜零の記憶〜)	Shinichiro Kimura	Tomoko Konparu	November 2, 2011
7	"Pure Heart Chocolate: A Pure Heart"; Transliteration: "Pyua Hāto Chokorēto: Hāto no Junshin" (Japanese: ピュアハートチョコレート 〜ハートの純真〜)	Shinichiro Kimura	Tomoko Konparu	December 28, 2011
8	"Gâteau Opéra: The Songstress's Invitation"; Transliteration: "Gatō Opera: Utahime no Yūwaku" (Japanese: ガトーオペラ 〜歌姫の誘惑〜)	Shinichiro Kimura	Tomoko Konparu	February 3, 2012
9	"Red Cherry Chocolate: Demise of a Ghost"; Transliteration: "Reddo Cherī Chokorēto: Rei no Shūen" (Japanese: レッドチェリーチョコレート 〜零の終焉〜)	Shinichiro Kimura	Tomoko Konparu	April 3, 2012
10	"Chocolate Mold: Key to the Heart"; Transliteration: "Chokorēto Mōrudo: Kokoro no Kagi" (Japanese: チョコレートモールド 〜心の鍵〜)	Shinichiro Kimura	Tomoko Konparu	August 3, 2012
11	"Framboise: A Beautiful Sin"; Transliteration: "Furanbowāsu: Uruwashiki Tsumi" (Japanese: フランボワース 〜美しき罪〜)	Shinichiro Kimura	Tomoko Konparu	September 3, 2012
12	"Violet: Fabricated Love"; Transliteration: "Viore: Itsuwari no Koi" (Japanese: ヴィオレ 〜偽りの恋〜)	Shinichiro Kimura	Tomoko Konparu	December 1, 2012
13	"Mendiant: Shape of Life"; Transliteration: "Mandian: Inochi no Katachi" (Japanese: マンディアン 〜命のカタチ〜)	Shinichiro Kimura	Tomoko Konparu	December 28, 2012

=== Light novels ===
The light novel adaptation of The Magic of Chocolate is written by Riku Hozumi (穂積りく) with illustrations provided by Rino Mizuho. Volume 4 was written by Sayoko Fujiwara (藤原サヨコ), with Hozumi credited as a co-writer. The light novel series is published by Shogakukan under the Shogakukan Junior Bunko imprint.

No.	Title	Japanese release date	Japanese ISBN
1	The Magic of Chocolate: Chocolate Dacquoise, Labyrinth of Memories; Shokora no Mahō: Dakkuwāzu Shokora, Kioku no Meikyū (ショコラの魔法〜ダックワーズショコラ 記憶の迷路〜)	July 4, 2011	978-4-0923-0722-3
2	The Magic of Chocolate: Classic Chocolate, The Lost Story; Shokora no Mahō: Kurashikku Shokora, Ushinawareta Monogatari (ショコラの魔法〜クラシックショコラ 失われた物語〜)	February 8, 2012	978-4-0923-0723-0
3	The Magic of Chocolate: Ispahan, Love from Roses; Shokora no Mahō: Isupahan, Bara no Koi (ショコラの魔法〜イスパハン 薔薇の恋〜)	August 1, 2012	978-4-0923-0729-2
4	The Magic of Chocolate: Chocolate Scone, the Ice Curse Academy; Shokora no Mahō: Shokora Sukōn, Kōri Noroi no Gakuen (ショコラの魔法〜ショコラスコーン 氷呪の学園〜)	February 26, 2014	978-4-0923-0753-7
5	The Magic of Chocolate: Ginger Macaron, Mid-afternoon Dreams; Shokora no Mahō: Jinjā Makaron, Mahiru no Yume (ショコラの魔法〜ジンジャーマカロン 真昼の夢〜)	August 5, 2014	978-4-0923-0775-9

=== Film ===
A live-action movie adaptation, first announced in January 2021, was released on June 18 the same year. The film stars Maho Yamaguchi as Chocolat in her film debut. It is produced by Shinya Furugori and Kana Ohtsubo, with Tomonobu Morikawa directing and Tatsuya Kanazawa writing the script.

=== Other media and merchandise ===
An official fanbook titled The Magic of Chocolate: H to I was released on April 30, 2013. In February 2013, The Magic of Chocolate collaborated with lolita fashion brand Baby, The Stars Shine Bright to produce a dress based on Chocolat.

== Reception ==
Along with Duel Masters, The Magic of Chocolate won the 66th Shogakukan Manga Award in the children category in 2021.
