= Hime Gal Paradise =

Japanese manga series

姫ギャルパラダイス (Hime Gal Paradaisu)
- Genre: Comedy, Romance
- Manga
- Written by: Akira Wao
- Published by: Shogakukan
- Magazine: Ciao
- Original run: 2009 – 2012
- Volumes: 7

Hime Gal Paradise (Japanese: 姫ギャルパラダイス, Hepburn: Hime Gyaru Paradaisu; 'Princess Gal Paradise') is a Japanese romance manga series by Akira Wao. It was published by Shogakukan in Ciao from 2009 to 2012.

== Plot ==
Himeko Tachikawa (立川 姫子, Tachikawa Himeko) (Voiced by: Azumi Asakura) is a quiet girl who goes to the all-female Chō Shibuya High School. A stunning boy with the surname Tochiotome transfers into her class and transforms Himeko into a princess.

== Media ==
=== Manga ===
Hime Gal Paradise ran in the manga magazine Ciao from November 27, 2009, until November 30, 2012. There are seven volumes in total.

No.	Japanese release date	Japanese ISBN
1	November 27, 2009	978-4-09-132709-3
2	July 1, 2010	978-4-09-133368-1
3	December 24, 2010	978-4-09-133620-0
4	July 29, 2011	978-4-09-133885-3
5	December 26, 2011	978-4-09-134238-6
6	June 1, 2012	978-4-09-134458-8
7	November 30, 2012	978-4-09-134569-1
