= Mirmo! =

Japanese media franchise

- Mirmo! Zibang
- First tankōbon volume cover

ミルモでポン! (Mirumo de Pon!)
- Genre: Fantasy; Romantic comedy
- Manga
- Written by: Hiromu Shinozuka
- Published by: Shogakukan
- English publisher: SG: Chuang Yi
- Magazine: Ciao
- Original run: August 3, 2001 – December 1, 2005
- Volumes: 12
- Anime television series
- Directed by: Kenichi Kasai
- Written by: Michihiro Tsuchiya
- Studio: Studio Hibari
- Licensed by: NA: Viz Media
- Original network: TXN (TV Tokyo)
- English network: PH: Cartoon Network
- Original run: April 6, 2002 – September 27, 2005
- Episodes: 172
- Manga

Mirmo de Pon! New
- Written by: Hiromu Shinozuka
- Published by: Shogakukan
- Magazine: Ciao
- Original run: March 3, 2026 – present
- icon

Mirmo! Zibang, known in Japan as Mirumo de Pon! (ミルモでポン!), is a Japanese manga written and illustrated by Hiromu Shinozuka. It was serialized in Shogakukan's shōjo manga magazine Ciao from August 2001 to December 2005, with its chapters collected in twelve tankōbon volumes. Chuang Yi released the manga in English in Singapore.

A 172-episode anime television series adaptation, known in Japan as Wagamama Fairy: Mirumo de Pon! and produced by Studio Hibari, was broadcast on TV Tokyo from April 2002 to September 2005. It was licensed in North America by Viz Media.

The manga series won the 2003 Kodansha Manga Award and the 2004 Shogakukan Manga Award in the children's manga category.

A manga sequel, titled Mirmo de Pon! New, started in Ciao in March 2026.

== Plot ==
Katie Minami, a cheerful but shy eighth grade middle school student, finds a strange cocoa mug that summons Mirmo, a mischievous love fairy. Mirmo reveals he is a runaway prince avoiding marriage to Princess Rima, which has caused bounty hunters and his brother Mulu to chase after him. Their antics attract the attention of the bumbling Warumo Gang, whose careless experiments with time magic accidentally freeze the fairy world. Mirmo and his friends must perform an ancient ritual involving a magical door and a time bird to restore balance.

Darkman, the series' main antagonist born from negative emotions, begins manipulating people through transfer student Cynthia. Mirmo and his allies develop special combined magic techniques to defeat Darkman. The group later assists Tako, a robotic octopus, by gathering seven emotion-based crystals needed to save his homeland. Overcoming various challenges, they help him fight the crystals' power.

== Characters ==
=== Fairies ===
Mirmo (ミルモ, Mirumo)
Voiced by: Etsuko Kozakura
Mirmo is a playful, yet selfish and lazy fairy. He is Katie's partner and Yatch's rival, and the prince of the Fairy World and Murumo's older brother. Although he is Rima's fiancé, he refuses to marry her because he only likes her as a friend. He uses a pair of maracas as his magic tools. His favorite dessert is chocolates and KumoCho.
Rima (リルム, Rirumu)
Voiced by: Mayuko Omimura
Rima is female fairy who is Dylan's partner. She loves Mirmo and wants to marry him, much to his disappointment. Rima is Mirmo's fiancée, and tries to get along with Mirmo on dates. She may look innocent, but can actually be quite aggressive.
Yatch (ヤシチ, Yashichi)
Voiced by: Yukiji
Like his partner Alexis, Yatch is brash and impatient with his henchmen, Sazo and Hanzo. He continues to annoy Mirumo to no end due to their long-standing rivalry. But even if Yatch and Mirmo are always fighting, they help each other to save their partners and other people.
Mulu (ムルモ, Murumo)
Voiced by: Rie Kugimiya
Mulu is Mirmo's younger brother and Kyle's partner. He is kind to his friends and willing to help them when they are in trouble, but can be greedy.

=== Humans ===
Kaede Minami (南 楓, Minami Kaede)
Voiced by: Mai Nakahara
Kaede is a cheerful teenager who is Mirmo's human partner. Though friendly and always willing to help those in need, she can get angry when she is tempted. Katie's main love interest is Dylan Yuki, and is the romantic rival of Alexis. Her results to grab his attention are mediocre as a result of her clumsiness.
Setsu Yuuki (結木摂, Yūki Setsu)
Voiced by: Yukitoshi Tokumoto (seasons 1–3), Daisuke Namikawa (season 4)
Setsu is a smart and quiet teenage bookworm and an honor student. He is silent and cold, but willing to help his friends, even if it makes him embarrassed.
Azumi Hidaka (日高 安純, Hidaka Azumi)
Voiced by: Hitomi
Azumi is a brash and impatient teenage girl who loves Setsu Yuki and is rivals with Kaede. She often beats up Katie whenever she sees Katie with Dylan. Azumi can be demanding sometimes, but helps her friends if she decides to.
Kaoru Matsutake (松竹 香, Matsutake Kaoru)
Voiced by: Sōichirō Hoshi
Kaoru is a wealthy teenage boy who is popular among girls. He would do anything to be Katie's boyfriend, but her crush on Dylan blocks that much to Kyle's chagrin.

=== Supporting characters ===
Etsumi Kido (城戸悦美, Kido Etsumi)
Voiced by: Kumiko Higa
Etsumi is Kaede's best friend who is captain of the volleyball team. Despite being best friends with Katie, she is entirely unaware of the existence of the fairy world. Etsumi initially had a crush on Kyle, but that soon faded and eventually started dating Kanna Haijime.
Mr. Tsuchida (土田先生, Tsuchita-sensei)
Voiced by: Hiroshi Tsuchida
Tsuchida is Kaede's homeroom teacher.
Sasuke (サスケ) / Sazo
Voiced by: Motoko Kumai
Sasuke is one of Yatch's lackeys who has a crush on Yamane.
Hanzo (ハンゾー)
Voiced by: Noriko Shitaya
Sasuke is one of Yatch's lackeys with a few unique skills, such as pronouncing an impossible tongue twister spell.
Hirai (平井)
Voiced by: Kentarō Itō
Hirai has been Kyle's butler since early childhood. He is skilled in everything and will do anything to impress his young master. Hirai even did his master's entire summer assignment. He and Hoshino are long-time rivals, but have a soft side for each other.
Warumo Gang (ワルモ団, Warumo-dan)
A group of villains in the series who plan to take over the Fairy Kingdom. They later become lackeys for Dark. They constantly cause trouble for Mirmo and his friends, but their tricks always fail due to their clumsiness.
Otome (オトメ)
Voiced by: Kae Araki
Otome is a crossdresser whom Yatch develops an interest in.
Papy (パピィ, Papi)
Voiced by: Kurumi Mamiya
Papy is female fairy who admires Mulu. Although they always quarrel when they meet, they in fact have a soft side for each other.
Momo Umezono (梅園桃, Umezono Momo)
Voiced by: Noriko Shitaya
Momo is Yamane's human partner who loves Kaoru and treats Katie as a rival.
Hoshino (星野)
Voiced by: Uko Tachibana
Momo's butler, Hoshino is the female counterpart of Hirai. She and Hirai are long-time rivals, but have a soft side for each other.
Yamane (ヤマネ)
Voiced by: Kazusa Murai
Yamane is a ninja fairy who is the younger sister of Nezumi.
Momiji Minami (南 もみじ, Minami Momiji)
Voiced by: Kazusa Murai
Momiji is Kaede's mother who is unaware of the existence of the fairy world. On the other hand, she thinks Kaede is crazy when she seems to be talking to herself, whereas Kaede is actually talking to Mirmo.

== Media ==
=== Manga ===
Written and illustrated by Hiromu Shinozuka, Mirmo! Zibang was serialized in Shogakukan's shōjo manga magazine Ciao from August 3, 2001, to December 1, 2005. (Note: It started in the magazine's September 2001 issue, released on August 3 of that same year.) (Note: It finished in the magazine's January 2006 issue, released on December 1, 2005.) Shogakukan collected its chapters in twelve tankōbon volumes, released from February 26, 2002, to March 31, 2006. A special chapter was published in Ciao on June 2, 2023. The manga was licensed for English release in Singapore by Chuang Yi.

A sequel, titled Mirmo de Pon! New (ミルモでポン！にゅ～, Mirumo de Pon! Nyu), started in Ciao on March 3, 2026; it finished on July 3 of the same year, and it was announced that it would receive a "second season". A side story is set to be published on September 3.

=== Anime ===
A 172-episode anime television series adaptation, titled Mirmo! Zibang and known in Japan as Wagamama Fairy: Mirumo de Pon! (わがまま☆フェアリー ミルモでポン!, Wagamama Fearī Mirumo de Pon!; Selfish Fairy Mirmo!), was broadcast on TV Tokyo from April 6, 2002, to September 27, 2005.

In North America, the series was licensed by ShoPro Entertainment. The company would eventually merge with Viz Communications to form Viz Media, and the series would be marketed as available for broadcasters.

=== Video games ===
Seven Mirmo video games were published by Konami between 2002 and 2005.

- Wagamama Fairy Mirmo de Pon! – Kogane Maracas no Densetsu (December 19 2002, Game Boy Advance)
- Wagamama Fairy Mirmo de Pon! – Mirmo no Mahō Gakkō Monogatari (March 20, 2003, PlayStation)
- Wagamama Fairy Mirmo de Pon! – Taisen ma Hōda ma (September 11, 2003, Game Boy Advance)
- Wagamama Fairy Mirmo de Pon! – 8-Ri no Toki no Yōsei (December 11, 2003, Game Boy Advance)
- Wagamama Fairy Mirmo de Pon! – Yume no Kakera (July 15, 2004, Game Boy Advance)
- Wagamama Fairy Mirmo de Pon! – Nazo no Kagi to Shinjitsu no Tobira (December 16, 2004, Game Boy Advance)
- Wagamama Fairy Mirmo de Pon! – Dokidoki Memorial Panic (September 8, 2005, Game Boy Advance)

== Reception ==
By June 2023, the manga had over 3 million copies in circulation. It won the 2003 Kodansha Manga Award and the 2004 Shogakukan Manga Award in children's manga category. The anime series received TV Tokyo's award for top-rated new program in 2003.
