= Chibi Devi! =

Japanese manga series

- Cover of the first manga volume

ちび☆デビ! (Chibi Debi!)
- Genre: Fantasy comedy
- Manga
- Written by: Hiromu Shinozuka
- Published by: Shogakukan
- Magazine: Ciao
- Original run: May 1, 2008 – November 1, 2014
- Volumes: 11
- Anime television series
- Directed by: Maki Kamiya
- Music by: Kōtarō Nakagawa
- Studio: SynergySP
- Original network: NHK Educational TV
- Original run: October 10, 2011 – February 17, 2014
- Episodes: 75
- Video game
- Developer: Alchemist
- Publisher: Alchemist
- Genre: Adventure
- Platform: Nintendo 3DS
- Released: September 27, 2012
- Video game

Chibi Devi! 2: The Magical Dream Picture Book
- Developer: Alchemist
- Publisher: Alchemist
- Genre: Adventure
- Platform: Nintendo 3DS
- Released: July 25, 2013
- icon

Chibi Devi! (Japanese: ちび☆デビ!, Hepburn: Chibi Debi!) is a Japanese manga series written and illustrated by Hiromu Shinozuka. It was serialized in Shogakukan's shōjo manga magazine Ciao from May 2008 to November 2014, with its chapters collected in eleven tankōbon volumes. Chibi Devi focuses on a middle schoolgirl who discovers a devil baby on her bed one day. It was adapted into a 75-episode anime television series by SynergySP, which aired from October 2011 to February 2014.

== Plot ==
Honoka Sawada is a lonely and shy orphan girl who is often teased by her classmates. After meeting a strange baby named Mao, she soon learns that he is connected to devils.

== Characters ==
Honoka Sawada (沢田 ほのか, Sawada Honoka)
Voiced by: Yuka Iguchi
Honoka is a shy 14-year-old middle schoolgirl who lost her parents at a young age and lives with her aunt Rikako. She lacks confidence and her classmates take advantage of her. The series begins with her wishing she was not lonely, which is granted when Honoka becomes Mao's substitute mother. As the series progresses, she develops feelings for Shin.
Mao (まお)
Voiced by: Noriko Shitaya
Mao is the baby devil entrusted to be raised by Honoka. His main costume is based on a dinosaur that gives him the ability to breathe fire. He is generally a happy child, but gets scared easily and often bursts into tears over the smallest of things, only to be always quick to recover. As the series progresses, Mao becomes aware of this and often tries to overcome his fears in an attempt to impress Honoka.
Shin Sugisaki (杉崎 真, Sugisaki Shin)
Voiced by: Hiroyuki Yoshino
Shin is a boy in second year of high school and Mao's substitute father. He was introduced to Honoka by Kyou and agreed to help Honoka raise Mao at his suggestion. In Episode 28, Shin is shown to be afraid of needles, but overcomes this phobia to help the devil children get inoculated.
Karin (かりん)
Voiced by: Ryō Hirohashi
Karin is a baby devil who goes to the same nursery as Mao. Her main costume is based on a penguin that gives her the ability to project icy blasts from her mouth. She is short-tempered and will quickly respond to violence. Since Itsuki taught her some childish jokes based on eggplants, she had an obsession with them.
Natsuki Takayama (高山 夏季, Takayama Natsuki)
Voiced by: Rie Yamaguchi
Natsuki is a girl in second year of high school. She is Karin's substitute mother.
Itsuki Takayama (高山 樹, Takayama Itsuki)
Voiced by: Yoshitsugu Matsuoka
Itsuki is Natsuki's younger brother who is in the same grade and school as Honoka. He is also Karin's substitute father.
Rai (ライ)
Voiced by: Mikako Takahashi
Rai is a baby devil who goes to the same nursery as Mao. His main costume consists of a pink wig with a small hat on it, and matching animal print shorts and this gives him the power to throw electricity. Rai is a well-behaved child who usually acts mature for his age, but sometimes can be quite mischievous. While learning to speak, Rai spent a lot of time watching Manzai comedy with Shiori, which is the reason he speaks with a Kansai dialect.
Shiori Nakagawa (中川 しおり, Nakagawa Shiori)
Voiced by: Asuka Nishi
Shiori is a girl in first year of middle school and Rai's substitute mother. She is quite outspoken and to begin with did not get along well with the other parents. At one point, Shiori considered abandoning Rai, only to become more approachable after an intervention by Honoka.
Principal (園長先生, Enchō-sensei)
Voiced by: Sōichirō Hoshi
The principal of the Chibi Devi Nursery who is always seen wearing thick glasses and has a grey moustache. He is an apparent expert on baby devils and has written an encyclopaedia on them which he gives a copy of to Honoka when Mao first starts at the nursery. The devil children love to practice their magic on him.
Ms. Itō (伊藤先生, Itō-sensei)
Voiced by: Ayumi Fujimura
Ms. Itō is a nursery teacher who often scolds the Principal for being as silly as the children.
Pepe (ペペ)
Voiced by: Ayumi Fujimura
Pepe is an animal from the Devil World that becomes the nursery's pet. Mao named Pepe after the sound his tail makes as it beats the floor while he walks. However, it is later revealed that his real name is Torakichi (トラキチ). He understands the human language but only speaks in squawk that is usually translated by one of the humans nearby.
Chiyo (ちよ)
Voiced by: Yuka Iguchi
Chiyo is a baby devil from a neighboring nursery. She is the same age as Mao, Karin and Rai. Her main costume is based on a tanuki that gives her the ability to transform anything in contact with a leaf together with Ryū.
Ryū (リュウ)
Voiced by: Ayumi Fujimura
Ryū is baby devil from a neighboring nursery who is Chiyo's younger brother. His main costume is based on a fox that gives him the ability to transform anything in contact with a leaf together with Chiyo.
Ghost of the Toilet (トイレの幽霊のお姉さん, Toire no Yūrei no Onēsan)
Voiced by: Mariya Ise
A young ghost who haunts the toilet at Pepe's house in the Devil World. She was an aggressive character until Mao learns to get along with her and gradually becomes very fond of her, but does not return his affection.
Kyō Tōno (遠野 京, Tōno Kyō)
Voiced by: Kōichi Bandō
Kyou is a boy in second year of high school who is in the same class as Shin. He is Honoka's childhood friend and was the person she always turned to before Mao arrived. Kyou is an otaku and often leaves abruptly to watch anime.
Aunt Rikako (理香子おばさん, Rikako-obasan)
Voiced by: Ayumi Fujimura
Rikako is Honoka's aunt and current guardian. Her work keeps her busy and is the reason she stays away from home for extended periods.

== Media ==
=== Manga ===
Written and illustrated by Hiromu Shinozuka, Chibi Devi! was serialized in Shogakukan's shōjo manga magazine Ciao from May 1, 2008, to November 1, 2014. Shogakukan collected its chapters in eleven tankōbon volumes, released from October 30, 2008, to January 30, 2015.

The manga has been licensed in Germany by Egmont, and France by Soleil.

==== Volumes ====
No.	Japanese release date	Japanese ISBN
1	October 30, 2008	978-4-09-132083-4
2	April 1, 2009	978-4-09-132338-5
3	August 28, 2009	978-4-09-132647-8
4	July 30, 2010	978-4-09-133376-6
5	March 1, 2011	978-4-09-133642-2
6	September 30, 2011	978-4-09-134086-3
6.5	December 26, 2011	978-4-09-134320-8
7	June 1, 2012	978-4-09-134456-4; 978-4-09-159121-0 (SE)
8	January 1, 2013	978-4-09-135140-1; 978-4-09-159136-4 (SE)
9	October 1, 2013	978-4-09-135597-3; 978-4-09-159159-3 (SE)
10	May 5, 2014	978-4-09-136150-9
11	January 30, 2015	978-4-09-136715-0

=== Anime ===
An anime television series based on the manga was announced in the October 2011 issue of Ciao. The series began airing on Japan's NHK Educational TV, NHK-E, as part of the Dai! Tensai Terebi-kun program block, airing from October 10, 2011 to February 17, 2014.

A costume design competition was announced on May 28, 2012, during the Dai! Tensai Terebi-kun program on NHK-E, immediately after episode 23 aired. This announcement was repeated again right after episode 25 (originally broadcast June 18, 2012) and a notification was put on the anime's homepage. The winning designs were featured in episode 39 as part of a "Magic Testing Room" which was a room where the children could use the magic from costumes not made by their parents.

==== Episodes ====
No.	Title	Original release date
1	"A Baby Boy Suddenly Appeared"; Transliteration: "Akachan wa Totsuzen ni" (Japanese: 赤ちゃんは突然に)	October 10, 2011
The life of middle school student Honoka Sawada has been different since she lost her parents and she is constantly bullied by her classmates as a result. One morning, Honoka, wakes up to find a strange baby with a devil tail named Mao. When Honoka is once again bullied by her classmates as she goes shopping for milk, Mao responds by blasting them with fire.
2	"Fire-Breathing Baby"; Transliteration: "Hi o fuku Akachan" (Japanese: 火を吹く赤ちゃん)	October 17, 2011
Honoka calls her childhood friend, Kyou Toono, and his classmate, Shin Sugisaki, to see Mao. When Kyou leaves to watch his favorite anime, Mao escapes from the apartment.
3	"Search for Mao-chan!"; Transliteration: "Mao-chan o Sagase!" (Japanese: まおちゃんを探せ!)	October 24, 2011
As Honoka and Shin search for Mao-chan, Mao-chan's exploration leads him to the top of a roof. Mao-chan is saved by a strange person who knows Mao's true nature.
4	"Mao-chan's Secret"; Transliteration: "Mao-chan no Himitsu" (Japanese: まおちゃんの秘密)	October 31, 2011
The man reveals himself to be the principal of a daycare for devil children such as Mao. When Honoka feels uneasy about becoming Mao's surrogate mother, she agrees to take care of him for a month while the Principal finds a replacement.
5	"First Daycare"; Transliteration: "Hajimete no Hoikuen" (Japanese: 初めての保育園)	November 14, 2011
Mao becomes grouchy towards Honoka after being left at the daycare center for the first time, but Shin manages to set things straight. Afterwards, the Principal gives Honoka an invite to a welcoming party where she will meet the parents of other devil children.
6	"Blizzard!? Lightning!?"; Transliteration: "Kachi-kachi!? Bari-bari!?" (Japanese: カチカチ!?バリバリ!?)	November 21, 2011
Honoka meets some of the other parents and learns that demon children have unique special abilities depending on what costume is worn. They use these abilities to protect their parents.
7	"Papa and Mama Are Fighting!?"; Transliteration: "Papa to Mama ga Kenka!?" (Japanese: パパとママがケンカ!?)	November 28, 2011
Honoka becomes intimidated by Shin when he constantly scolds her for her clumsiness. Later that night, Mao comes down with a fever.
8	"Mao-chan in a Pinch!?"; Transliteration: "Mao-chan, Pinchi!?" (Japanese: まおちゃん、ピンチ!?)	December 5, 2011
Reading the book that the Principal gave her, Honoka stops Mao's fever by allowing him to release magic. As Honoka and Shin reconcile, Honoka's aunt, Rikako, comes home and is surprised when she sees Mao.
9	"The Great Friends Plan!"; Transliteration: "Nakayoshi Daisakusen!" (Japanese: 仲良し大作戦!)	December 12, 2011
With Shin's help, Honoka expresses her lonely feelings to her Aunt.
10	"A Fun Playdate?"; Transliteration: "Tanoshī Oyūgikai?" (Japanese: 楽しいおゆうぎ会?)	January 9, 2012
Honoka attends a practice for a playdate with the mothers of the other devil children, Natsuki and Shiori, who do not get along with each other.
11	"Everyone's Playdate?"; Transliteration: "Minna no Oyūgikai?" (Japanese: みんなのおゆうぎ会?)	January 16, 2012
Following Shin's advice, Honoka tries to help everyone get along by encouraging the children to play together.
12	"A Stormy Playdate!"; Transliteration: "Arashi no Oyūgikai!" (Japanese: 嵐のおゆうぎ会!)	January 23, 2012
The devil children try to get along during their playdate.
13	"First Sleepover"; Transliteration: "Hajimete no Otomari" (Japanese: 初めてのお泊り)	February 6, 2012
Mao-chan spends his first night without Honoka at the nursery, but it does not seem to be going perfectly.
14	"Chibi Devi Expedition"; Transliteration: "Chibi Debi Tankentai" (Japanese: ちびデビ探検隊)	February 13, 2012
Mao-chan and friends take a test of courage while spending the night at the nursery. They have to get past all sorts of obstacles. The frightened devil babies try to overcome their fears together.
15	"Goodbye Mao-chan"; Transliteration: "Sayonara Mao-chan" (Japanese: さよならまおちゃん)	February 20, 2012
Honoka's time with Mao-chan has ended. Soon after leaving, she realizes that she loves Mao-chan and runs straight back to the daycare center.
16	"Mao-chan's Daycare Journal"; Transliteration: "Mao-chan no Hoiku Nikki" (Japanese: まおちゃんの保育日記)	April 2, 2012
Honoka and Shin get to meet Karin's father figure, who turns out to be Natsuki's younger brother, Itsuki. Itsuki goes to the same school and is in the same grade as Honoka.
17	"First Feelings/First Sentiments"; Transliteration: "Hajimete no Kimochi" (Japanese: 初めての気持ち)	April 9, 2012
Honoka begins to realize her feelings for Shin.
18	"Mao-chan Throws a Tantrum"; Transliteration: "Mao-chan Ōabare!?" (Japanese: まおちゃん大暴れ!?)	April 16, 2012
Mao gets jealous when Honoka is not paying attention to him and tries to get her attention by throwing a tantrum.
19	"Where is Mao-chan!?"; Transliteration: "Mao-chan wa Dokoni!?" (Japanese: まおちゃんはどこに!?)	April 23, 2012
Natsuki helps Honoka and Shin look for Mao-chan. Itsuki finds Mao in an unexpected place.
20	"Rai-chan's Mama"; Transliteration: "Rai-chan no Mama" (Japanese: ライちゃんのママ)	May 7, 2012
Honoka and Shin take care of Rai while Honoka tries to convince Shiori to come back as Rai's mother.
21	"Shiori-chan's True Feelings"; Transliteration: "Shiori-chan no Honshin" (Japanese: しおりちゃんの本心)	May 14, 2012
Continuing from the previous episode, Honoka continues to be persistent until Shiori's true feelings are revealed.
22	"Meeting Shin-san"; Transliteration: "Shin-san to no Deai" (Japanese: 真さんとの出会い)	May 21, 2012
Honoka reflects on some of her encounters with Shin.
23	"Heart-pounding Park Debut"; Transliteration: "Doki-doki Kōen Debyū" (Japanese: ドキドキ公園デビュー)	May 28, 2012
Mao is introduced to other kids at the park.
24	"Stand Up, Mao-chan!"; Transliteration: "Tate, Mao-chan!" (Japanese: 立て、まおちゃん!)	June 11, 2012
Mao becomes the last devil children to stand up and walk.
25	"Chibi Devi Sports Day"; Transliteration: "Chibi Devi Undōkai" (Japanese: ちびデビ運動会)	June 18, 2012
On Sports Day at the Chibi Devi Daycare, Mao competes against Karin and Rai.
26	"Careful Not to Get Sick"; Transliteration: "Kaze ni Goyōjin" (Japanese: カゼにご用心)	June 25, 2012
Honoka catches a cold and needs to rest for the day. Shin does his best to take care of her and Mao.
27	"Big Confession Strategy!"; Transliteration: "Kokuhaku Daisakusen!" (Japanese: 告白大作戦!)	July 2, 2012
Honoka is encouraged to confess her feelings to Shin.
28	"Shots Are Scary?"; Transliteration: "Chūsha wa Kowai?" (Japanese: 注射はこわい?)	July 9, 2012
When Mao and the other devil children have to get inoculated, Shin needs to get over his fear of shots to help them. At the end, Mao spoke his first word.
29	"Talking Mao-chan"; Transliteration: "Oshaberi Mao-chan" (Japanese: おしゃべりまおちゃん)	September 10, 2012
Having spoken his first word, Mao learns to say new words. Karin and Rai have also begun to talk. One month later, Mao-chan reveals a secret.
30	"Mama and Papa"; Transliteration: "Manma to Pāpa" (Japanese: まんまとぱぁぱ)	September 24, 2012
Honoka makes her relationship with Shin awkward by avoiding him. Mao is initially puzzled but becomes determined to get his parents to reconcile, believing them to be fighting.
31	"Irritated Karin-chan"; Transliteration: "Ira-ira Karin-chan" (Japanese: イライラかりんちゃん)	October 8, 2012 (Note: The official episode list says this episode originally aired on October 1, 2012 but it actually aired October 8, 2012.)
Karin-chan starts acting out. Honoka and Shin get some help from Mao-chan to find out why.
32	"Rai's Secret"; Transliteration: "Rai-chan no Himitsu" (Japanese: ライちゃんのひみつ)	October 15, 2012
Everyone believes Rai to be an obedient and good boy. When Shiori worries about him not being childish enough, the principal shows her another side of Rai.
33	"Present for Mama"; Transliteration: "Mama e no Purezento" (Japanese: ママへのプレゼント)	October 22, 2012
During arts and crafts lesson at the nursery, Mao is excited to create something for Honoka and works hard on the present. He accidentally ruins his artwork, causing his present to get ruined a little, but Honoka is still happy.
34	"Mao-chan's Obsession"; Transliteration: "Mao-chan no Maibūmu" (Japanese: まおちゃんのマイブーム)	October 29, 2012
Mao becomes fascinated by the remote control and other button-pushing electronics.
35	"Mysterious Being"; Transliteration: "Nazo no Ikimono" (Japanese: なぞのいきもの)	November 5, 2012
Mao-chan and the other devil children meet someone new, but find it hard to interact with the strange creature.
36	"Let's Make a House"; Transliteration: "Ouchi o Tsukurō" (Japanese: おうちをつくろう)	November 12, 2012
Mao, Rai, and Karin work to build a house for their new pet. Mao continues to have difficulties as the strange creature attempts to become friends with him.
37	"Like? Hate?"; Transliteration: "Suki? Kirai?" (Japanese: スキ?キライ?)	November 19, 2012
After finding out that Mao is a picky eater, the daycare principal promises Honoka that he will get Mao used to eating cucumbers.
38	"Let's Go to the Supermarket"; Transliteration: "Sūpā e Ikō" (Japanese: スーパーへいこう)	November 26, 2012
Mao, Karin, and Rai go to the supermarket for the first time on their own. Pepe accompanies them with a camera on his head so Honoka, Shiori, and Natsuki can watch the children's behaviors from the daycare.
39	"Full of Costumes"; Transliteration: "Kigurumi Ippai" (Japanese: きぐるみいっぱい)	December 3, 2012
The daycare's Principal shows everyone the Magic Testing Room, where there are many costumes for the devil children to wear and to try different kinds of magic. Mao-chan and the others can use magic from wearing these special costumes even though their mothers did not make those costumes.
40	"Mao-chan Loves to Help!"; Transliteration: "Otetsudai Daisuki!" (Japanese: おてつだい大好き!)	January 7, 2013
The daycare's Principal announces the Lend A Hand Contest to the devil children, which will determine the most helpful ones to their parents.
41	"Karin-chan's Wings"; Transliteration: "Karin-chan no Hane" (Japanese: かりんちゃんのハネ)	January 14, 2013
Karin-chan's devil baby wings begin to grow. Itsuki, her father figure, uses this chance to play a trick on her.
42	"Rai-chan's Car"; Transliteration: "Rai-chan no Jidōsha" (Japanese: ライちゃんの自動車)	January 21, 2013
Rai-chan loves his remote-controlled toy car so much. However, when Shiori taking his toy car to get ready for bed time, he rebels the next day at the daycare.
43	"Devil's Festival?"; Transliteration: "Akuma no Omatsuri?" (Japanese: 悪魔のおまつり?)	January 28, 2013
The daycare's Principal and Ms Itou hold a devil's festival for the children.
44	"The Dream Picture Book"; Transliteration: "Yume no Ehon" (Japanese: 夢のえほん)	February 11, 2013
The Principal of the daycare orders a dream picture book that allows all the sleeping devil children to share the same dream when the book is placed underneath their pillows. He chooses to give them the "Big Adventure" dream.
45	"The Big Adventure Dream"; Transliteration: "Yume no Daibōken" (Japanese: 夢の大冒険)	February 18, 2013
Continuing from the previous episode, Mao and his classmates continue the Big Adventure by entering the treasure cave.
46	"Kiss Me, Mao-chan"; Transliteration: "Chū Shite, Mao-chan" (Japanese: ちゅうして、まおちゃん)	April 8, 2013
Mao learns what a kiss is for and begins to give everyone a peck on the cheek to show his affection for them.
47	"Grumpy Karin-chan"; Transliteration: "Okorinbo Karin-chan" (Japanese: おこりんぼかりんちゃん)	April 15, 2013
Karin goes through a phase of being grumpy and cranky.
48	"Big Brother's Picture Drama"; Transliteration: "Kamishibai Onīsan" (Japanese: 紙しばいお兄さん)	April 22, 2013
The devil children get to see a picture show when they are visited by a storyteller at the daycare.
49	"Little Guest"; Transliteration: "Chīsana Okyakusan." (Japanese: 小さなお客さん)	May 6, 2013
Kids from another daycare visit Mao's daycare.
50	"Mao-chan Acts Tough"; Transliteration: "Tsuyogari Mao-chan" (Japanese: つよがりまおちゃん)	May 13, 2013
Mao wants Honoka to know that he is reliable by putting on a show of courage and refuses to cry to show his strength. However, Mao-chan reverts to the original form of when he first appeared before Honoka and Shin.
51	"Baby Return"; Transliteration: "Aka-chan Gaeri" (Japanese: 赤ちゃんがえり)	May 20, 2013
Mao's childish behavior has made him overwhelmed and he returns to a baby, so Rai and Karin must look after him at the nursery.
52	"The Devil Hairstylist"; Transliteration: "Akuma no Biyōshi-san" (Japanese: 悪魔の美容師さん)	May 27, 2013
After Itsuki helps cut Karin's hair, Natsuki will do anything to change it back, so the Principal summons a hairdresser from the Devil World to see if he can help.
53	"Love Rival!?"; Transliteration: "Koi no Raibaru!?" (Japanese: 恋のライバル！？)	June 10, 2013
Chiyo and Ryuu return to the nursery.
54	"Mao-chan's Umbrella"; Transliteration: "Mao-chan no Kasa" (Japanese: まおちゃんのかさ)	June 17, 2013
Honoka buys Mao an umbrella in preparation for the upcoming rainy season. However, Mao enlists Karin's magic after finding out that the rain is coming sooner than expected.
55	"Let's Go to the Devil World!"; Transliteration: "Akuma-kai e Ikō!" (Japanese: 悪魔界へ行こう！)	June 24, 2013
The Principal, Ms. Itou, Rai, Karin, Mao and Pepe go on a school trip to Pepe's house in the Devil World!
56	"The Secret of Pepe's House"; Transliteration: "Pepe-ke no Himitsu" (Japanese: ペペ家の秘密 (Note: The official episode list calls this episode "ペペ家のヒミツ" while the title card in its opening uses "ペペ家の秘密". They can be translated the same way.))	July 1, 2013
Honoka and the devils enjoy their stay at Pepe's house in the Devil World until they discover the toilet has a secret.
57	"Lady of the Toilet"; Transliteration: "Toire no Onē-san" (Japanese: トイレのおねえさん)	July 8, 2013
(Part Three) The toilet in Pepe's house is haunted! This is the perfect chance for Mao to try to get over his fear of ghosts and make a friend in the process.
58	"Karin-chan's Battle"; Transliteration: "Karin-chan no Tatakai" (Japanese: かりんちゃんの戦い)	September 2, 2013
After being bitten by a mosquito, Karin declares war on them.
59	"Rai-chan's Bed-wetting"; Transliteration: "Rai-chan to Onesho" (Japanese: ライちゃんとおねしょ)	September 9, 2013
Rai wets the bed during his afternoon nap and enlists Mao and Karin to help him overcome it.
60	"Guess What I Am?"; Transliteration: "Nanigokko?" (Japanese: なにごっこ？)	September 16, 2013
Natsuki, Honoka and Shiori are invited to the nursery to watch the children play an improvisation game.
61	"When I Grow Up..."; Transliteration: "Ōkiku Nattara" (Japanese: 大きくなったら)	September 23, 2013
At nursery Rai, Mao and Karin are drawing and discussing what they'd like to be when they're older. Then the Principal has a brilliant idea...
62	"Let's Go to the Mountain!"; Transliteration: "Yama e Ikou!" (Japanese: 山へ行こう！)	October 7, 2013
The kids and staff at the nursery are joined by Chiyo and Ryuu for a walk in the hills.
63	"A New Teacher?"; Transliteration: "Atarashii Sensei?" (Japanese: 新しい先生？)	October 14, 2013
Ms Itou is unable to come to school so a cover supervisor is sent from the Devil World to help for the day.
64	"What's a Butler?"; Transliteration: "Shitsujitte Nāni?" (Japanese: しつじってなぁに？)	October 21, 2013
Shiori is busy at school so her butler comes to collect Rai from nursery. But what is a butler?
65	"Karin's Big Challenge!"; Transliteration: "Karin-chan no Dai-chōsen" (Japanese: かりんちゃんの大挑戦)	October 28, 2013
Karin is concerned about her weight, and wants to get fitter so she can keep up with Itsuki.
66	"Battle with Clay!"; Transliteration: "Nendo de Taisen!" (Japanese: ねんどで対戦！)	November 11, 2013
The Principal ordered some magic powder that can be used to make clay figures come alive and battle! Mao, Rai, Karin and the Principal then has a tournament at the nursery.
67	"Mao-chan and Little Red Riding Hood"; Transliteration: "Mao-chan to Akazukin-chan" (Japanese: まおちゃんと赤ずきんちゃん)	November 18, 2013
The Principal has ordered a portal to the world of stories. Mao meets Little Red Riding Hood and she comes to visit the human world.
68	"Walk with Dad"; Transliteration: "Papa to Osanpo" (Japanese: パパとおさんぽ)	November 25, 2013
Honoka has to go out so Mao spends the day with Shin. After playing in the house they decide to go out for a walk where they meet Shin's school friends.
69	"Mao-chan's Christmas"; Transliteration: "Mao-chan no Kurisumasu" (Japanese: まおちゃんのクリスマス)	December 2, 2013
It's Christmas at the nursery and Mao is excited to meet Santa.
70	"Motchy of the Mochi"; Transliteration: "Omochi no Mocchī" (Japanese: おもちのもっちー)	January 6, 2014
The nursery is celebrating new years and the Principal has borrowed a mortar from the devil world to prepare mochi with.
71	"Defeat the Tooth Decay"; Transliteration: "Mushiba o Yattsukero" (Japanese: むしばをやっつけろ)	January 13, 2014
Mao has a cavity so the Principal summons a dentist from the Devil World to deal with it using devil magic.
72	"Everyone's Morning"; Transliteration: "Minna no Asa" (Japanese: みんなの朝)	January 20, 2014
Everyone's late to nursery, and the staff want to find out if the reasons are related.
73	"Principal's Cold"; Transliteration: "Enchō-sensei no Kaze" (Japanese: 園長先生のカゼ)	January 27, 2014
The principal has caught a cold and the children want to do anything they can to help him get better.
74	"Mao-chan, To The Universe!"; Transliteration: "Mao-chan, Uchū e!" (Japanese: まおちゃん、宇宙へ!)	February 10, 2014
Mao-chan would love a star of his own, so the nursery goes on a trip to the Devil World to get him one.
75	"Back Home With Everyone!"; Transliteration: "Minna de Tadaima!" (Japanese: みんなでただいま！)	February 17, 2014
On the other side of the black hole, the babies meet a mysterious race of aliens.
