= Mizuiro Jidai =

Japanese manga and anime series

水色時代
- Manga
- Written by: Yuu Yabuuchi
- Published by: Shogakukan
- Magazine: Ciao
- Original run: 1991 – 1994
- Volumes: 7
- Anime television series
- Directed by: Hiroko Tokita
- Written by: Junki Takegami
- Studio: Studio Comet
- Original network: TXN (TV Tokyo)
- Original run: 4 April 1996 – 27 February 1997
- Episodes: 47

Mizuiro Jidai (水色時代; "Aqua Age") is a Japanese manga series which was serialized in 1991 by Shogakukan. in the shōjo manga magazine Ciao. A 47-episode anime television series based on the manga was produced by NAS and TV Tokyo and animated by Studio Comet; it aired on TV Tokyo from 1996 to 1997. During the run of the anime a continuation of the story called "Shin Mizuiro Jidai" was run in Ciao Magazine. The series was made into a musical in 2001 and a cast recording was released.

== Plot ==
The story of the anime follows Yuko Kawai, a junior highschool student, as she faces the challenges of growing up and overcoming her shyness as she comes of age. She begins seeing her best friend Hiroshi Naganuma, the boy next door, in a different light.

== Characters ==
- Yuko Kawai (河合 優子, Kawai Yūko)

Voiced by: Masami Suzuki

The main character in the story.

- Hiroshi Naganuma (長沼 博士, Naganuma Hiroshi)

Voiced by: Jun Akiyama

A childhood friend of Yuko Kawai who has a crush on her. When he confessed to her, at first he did not get a straight answer.

- Takako Takahata (高幡 多可子, Takahashi Takako)

Voiced by: Chieko Higuchi

A friend of Yuko Kawai and a classmate. She has a pretty strong will and had a crush on Hiroshi Naganuma.

- Miyuki Kitano (北野 深雪, Kitano Miyuki)

Voiced by: Eri Miyajima

== Episodes ==
No.	Title	Original release date
1	"New School Term"; Transliteration: "Shin gakki" (Japanese: 新学期)	April 4, 1996
2	"Friendship"; Transliteration: "Yuujou" (Japanese: 友情)	April 11, 1996
3	"Camping School"; Transliteration: "Rinka gakkou" (Japanese: 林間学校)	April 18, 1996
4	"Softball Tournament"; Transliteration: "Sofutoboru taikai" (ソフトボール大会)	April 25, 1996
5	"Chance Encounter"; Transliteration: "Surechigai" (Japanese: すれちがい)	May 2, 1996
6	"Big Sister"; Transliteration: "Oneechan" (Japanese: お姉ちゃん)	May 9, 1996
7	"Christmas Party"; Transliteration: "Kurisumasu kai" (Japanese: クリスマス会)	May 16, 1996
8	"Valentine's Day"; Transliteration: "Barentain de" (Japanese: バレンタインデー)	May 23, 1996
9	"Final Exams"; Transliteration: "Gakunenmatsu tesuto" (Japanese: 学年末テスト)	May 30, 1996
10	"New Classes"; Transliteration: "Kurasugae" (Japanese: クラス替え)	June 6, 1996
11	"Takako's Sweetheart"; Transliteration: "Takako no koi" (Japanese: タカ子の恋)	June 13, 1996
12	"Pulling Rank"; Transliteration: "Senpai kouhai" (Japanese: 先輩後輩)	June 20, 1996
13	"Jealousy"; Transliteration: "Jierashi" (Japanese: ジェラシー)	June 27, 1996
14	"Diet"; Transliteration: "Daietto" (Japanese: ダイエット)	July 4, 1996
15	"Summer Vacation"; Transliteration: "Natsuyasumi" (Japanese: ダイエット)	July 11, 1996
16	"Stormy Season"; Transliteration: "Arashi no kisetsu" (Japanese: 嵐の季節)	July 18, 1996
17	"Ordinary"; Transliteration: "Futsū" (Japanese: ふつう)	July 25, 1996
