= Chitose Yagami =

Japanese manga artist

- Born: May 18, 1969 (age 57) Aichi, Japan
- Area: Manga artist
- Notable works: Fall in Love Like a Comic!, Kings of My Love

Chitose Yagami (八神 千歳, Yagami Chitose; born May 18 in Nagoya, Aichi Prefecture, Japan) is a Japanese manga artist. She made her professional manga debut in 2001 with Magical ✰ Project. Her list of works include Fall in Love Like a Comic!, Boku no Platinum Lady, Kiss x Kiss, Ikenai Navigation, and Kings of My Love.

== Works ==
| Series | Year | Notes | Refs |
|---|---|---|---|
| Kiss Shite ♥ Chō Nōryoku Shōjo (ja:KISSして・超能力少女) | 2002 | Published in Ciao magazine | |
| Chao-den GEKI-teki-ra bu romonsu (電GEKI的らぶロモンス) | 2002 | One-shot in Ciao | |
| Fall in Love Like a Comic! | 2002 | Serialized in Ciao; Published by Shogakukan and Viz Media for 2 volumes | |
| Kurumichikku Mirakuru (くるみちっく・ミラクル, Kurumi-tic Miracle) | 2003 | Serialized in Ciao | |
| Ikenai Nabigēshon (いけない・ナビゲーション, Ikenai Navigation) | 2003–04 | Serialized in Ciao; Published for 2 volumes | |
| Nana& mikkī no dokidoki manga ressun (ナナ&ミッキーのドキドキまんがレッスン, Nana & Mikki's Heart-throbbing manga lesson) | 2003 | Serialized in Ciao | |
| Kisu Kisu (ja:キス・キス, Kiss x Kiss) | 2004–05 | Serialized in Ciao; Published in 3 volumes | |
| Onayamai manga dojo (おなやみまんが道場) | 2004 | Serialized in Ciao | |
| Boku no Purachina Redī (ja:ボクのプラチナレディー, My Platinum Lady) | 2005–06 | Serialized in Ciao; Published in 3 volumes | |
| Rabu Pani (ja:ラブぱに, Love Pani) | 2006–12 | Serialized in Ciao Deluxe, released as four parts. | |
| Tonari no Hijiri-kun (ja:となりの聖くん, My Neighbor Hijiri-kun) | 2006 | serialized in ChuChu magazine 1 volume | |
| Kyarameru Kissu (ja:きゃらめる♥キッス, Caramel Kiss) | 2006–08 | Serialized in Ciao; Includes Chu! and Sweet! and Bitter Sweet; Published in 4 volumes | |
| Onigawara Yokochō Sanchōme (ja:おにがわら横町三丁目, Red Devil of Onigawara Yokocho) | 2008–09 | Serialized in Ciao; Published in 2 volumes | |
| Kings of My Love (ja:オレ様キングダム, Ore-sama Kingudamu) | 2012–present | Serialized in Ciao; Published for 12 volumes, Also Fan Book and Best Kiss Selection | |
| goku ama koisuru fantajī (極あま♥恋するファンタジー) | | Ciao anthology | |
| Shōgakusei datte koi shitai! (小学生だって恋したい！, I Want to Love Even Elementary School Students!) | | Ciao anthology | |
| Kings of My Love -Red- | | Junior paperback | |
| Kings of My Love -Blue- | | Junior paperback | |
| Love Pani | | Junior paperback | |

=== Collaborations ===
| Series and co-author | Year | Notes | Refs |
|---|---|---|---|
| Oideyo! Henamon sekai kasumin (おいでよ！ヘナモン世界 カスミン) with Reiko Yoshida | 2001–02 | Serialized in Ciao; first serialization | |
| Himecha n& ra biku n no rakkī mi-ra kuru ☆ hoshi uranai (ひめちゃん&らびくんのラッキーみらくる☆星うらない) with Ophelia Rei | 2002 | Serialized in Ciao | |
| Fall in Love Like a Comic!, novelization by Maki Sugawa | 2002 | Published under Ciao Novels | |
| Inazuma Eleven Go (イナズマイレブンGO) with Level-5 | 2012 | Two chapters in Ciao | |
| Animaru Prinsu (アニマル★プリンス, Animal Prince), novelization by Mashiro Yabuki | 2010 | Printed in Ciao; Rururu novels | |
