= Ciao (magazine) =

Japanese manga magazine

- July 2006 issue cover featuring characters from Kirarin Revolution, Oshare Majo: Love and Berry, Gokujō!! Mecha Mote Iinchō, Koisuru Purin! and Tamagotchi
- Categories: Shōjo manga
- Frequency: Monthly
- Circulation: 70,000; (July–September 2026)
- First issue: September 3, 1977
- Company: Shogakukan
- Country: Japan
- Based in: Tokyo
- Language: Japanese
- Website: Ciao Land

Ciao (Japanese: ちゃお, Hepburn: Chao) is a Japanese shōjo manga magazine published by Shogakukan. The magazine launched on September 3, 1977. It comes with a gift which used to be paper crafts, but now varies. The magazine's competitors are Ribon and Nakayoshi. Manga published in Ciao are released under the Ciao Comics imprint.

== Serializations ==
=== Current ===
- Kocchi Muite! Miiko (1995–present)
- The Magic of Chocolate (2008–present)
- Yo-kai Watch: Exciting Nyanderful Days (2014–present)
- My New Life as a Cat (2015–present)
- Aikatsu On Parade! (2019–present)
- Futari wa S×S Superpower Girls Leo Chill (2人はS×S超能力ガールズ★レオチル, Futari wa S×S Chō Nōryoku Gāruzu Reo Chiru) (2022–present)
- Akuma de Kore wa Koi janai! (アクマでこれは恋じゃない！) (2023–present)
- Onegai AiPri (2026–present)

=== Past ===
==== 1977–1989 ====
- Alpen Rose (1983–1986)
- Slow Step (1986–1991)

==== 1990–1999 ====
- Mizuiro Jidai (1991–1994)
- Muka Muka Paradise (1993–1994)
- Tonde Burin (1994–1995)
- Wedding Peach (1994–1996)
- Angel Lip (1996–1999)
- Revolutionary Girl Utena (1996–1998)
- Cutie Honey Flash (1997–1998)
- Magical Pokémon Journey (1997–2003)
- Hamtaro (1997–2000)
- Corrector Yui (1999–2000)
- Pukupuku Natural Circular Notice (1999–2005)
- Ask Dr. Rin! (1999–2003)

==== 2000–2009 ====
- Mirmo! (2001–2005)
- Panyo Panyo Di Gi Charat (2001–2003)
- Fall in Love Like a Comic! (2002)
- Beauty Pop (2003–2008)
- Kirarin Revolution (2004–2009)
- Twin Princess of Wonder Planet (2005–2006)
- Happy Happy Clover (2005–2008)
- Naisho no Tsubomi (2005–2012)
- Gokujō!! Mecha Mote Iinchō (2006–2014)
- Dennō Coil: The Comics (2007)
- Chibi Devi! (2008–2014)
- Wai Wai Hey! Say! JUMP (2008)
- Miracle Revolution: Kusumi Koharu no Monogatari (2009)
- Kings of My Love (2009–2014)
- Hime Gal Paradise (2009–2010)

==== 2010–2019 ====
- Kururun-Rieru Change! (2010)
- Mahochu! (2010–2012)
- Niji-iro Prism Girl (2010–2013)
- Puriri! Lilpri (2011)
- Pretty Rhythm: Aurora Dream (2011–2012)
- Secret Girls: Naisho no Idol (2011–2013)
- Elite Jack!! (2012)
- Age 12 (2012–2019)
- Twinkle Collection (2013–2014)
- PriPara (2014–2017)
- Koi Shite! Runa Kiss (2014–2018)
- Aikatsu!: Secret Story (2014)
- Aikatsu!: Next Phase (2014)
- Aikatsu!: Go! Go! Go! (2015–2016)
- Aikatsu Stars! (2016–2018)
- Ijime (2015–2019)
- PriPri Chi-chan!! (2015–2019)
- Idol × Warrior Miracle Tunes! Kirakira Fever Live (2017–2018)
- Kiratto Pri Chan (2018–2021)
- Aikatsu Friends! (2018–2019)

==== 2020–2023 ====
- Waccha PriMagi! (2021–2022)
- Pokémon Horizons: Liko's Treasure (2023)

== Video games ==
- Ciao Dream Touch (Nintendo DS)
  - Ciao Manga School (Nintendo DS)
  - Ciao Illust Club (Nintendo 3DS)
