= Secret Girls =

Japanese streaming television series

- Season 2 logo
- Kanji: シークレットガールズ
- Genre: Drama
- Created by: Tōru Ōta
- Written by: Uiko Miura
- Directed by: Koto Nagata; Tadaaki Hōrai
- Starring: Yūna Itō; Kaede Hashimoto; Nao Asahi; Nanami Mitsuhashi; Mayu Tomita
- Opening theme: "Change the World" by Secret Girls
- Ending theme: "Change the World" by Secret Girls
- Composer: Agehasprings
- Country of origin: Japan
- No. of seasons: 2
- No. of episodes: 19

Production
- Executive producer: Takeshi Moriya
- Producer: Teruhisa Ukon
- Running time: 30 minutes
- Production company: Atmovie

Original release
- Network: Fuji TV
- Release: July 2, 2011 – April 3, 2013

Secret Girls (Japanese: シークレットガールズ, Hepburn: Shīkuretto Gāruzu) is a Japanese direct-to-video and streaming television series produced in cooperation with Fuji TV, Bandai, and Dentsu. The series stars Idoling!!! members Yūna Itō, Kaede Hashimoto, and Nao Asahi, as well as Nanami Mitsuhashi and Mayu Tomita. The series is centered on the fictional girl group of the same name, who lead a double life as normal middle school students and must hide the fact that they are idol singers in their daily lives.

Secret Girls ran for a total of two seasons, with 19 episodes released between 2011 and 2013. Each episode was distributed on the Ciao Ciao TV! DVD discs that were included as a bonus in the monthly shōjo manga magazine Ciao, with the episode later made available on Fuji TV's online streaming service, Misanga, in the same month.

Secret Girls launched a brief singing career for the cast, who performed as their characters at music events. In addition, manga and light novel adaptations were published, along with a merchandise toy line.

== Synopsis ==
Third-year middle school students Rio Shibaski and Maya Aramaki are fans of Secrets, an idol girl group whose personal lives and identities remain private. Rio and Maya later find out that the members of Secrets are their classmates, and they are recruited into the group. The five girls begin performing under the name Secret Girls and must continue to keep their double lives separate and a secret from others.

== Cast ==
- Yūna Itō as Rio Shibasaki (柴崎リオ), known under the stage name Liz
- Kaede Hashimoto as Maya Aramaki (荒木まや), known under the stage name Bee
- Nao Asahi as Miki Morikawa (森川未紀), known under the stage name Morm
- Nanami Mitsuhashi as Asako Yamamoto (山本麻子), known under the stage name Yah
- Mayu Tomita as Ai Takano (高野愛), known under the stage name Eye

== Episodes ==
Each episode of Secret Girls was released monthly through the Ciao Ciao TV! DVD discs that were included as a bonus in the shōjo manga magazine Ciao, with the episode later made available on Fuji TV's online streaming service, Misanga in the same month. Throughout the show's broadcast, Secret Girls was used in commercials for Curl C Girl, a hairpiece line by Bandai.

A second season was serialized monthly beginning with the August 2012 issue of Ciao, which released on July 3, 2012. The digital broadcast of the series was also made available on iTunes.

=== Season 1 (2011) ===
No. overall	No. in season	Title	Directed by	Written by	Original release date
1	1	"The Birth of Secret Girls!!"; Transliteration: "Shīkuretto Gāruzu Tanjō!!" (Japanese: シークレットガールズ誕生!!)	Koto Nagata; Tadaaki Hōrai	Uiko Miura	July 2, 2011
2	2	"A Harsh Distance to Becoming an Idol"; Transliteration: "Aidoru e no Kewashii Michinori" (Japanese: アイドルへの険しい道のり)	Koto Nagata; Tadaaki Hōrai	Uiko Miura	August 3, 2011
3	3	"A Summer Secret with My Mom"; Transliteration: "Natsu no Himitsu to Watashi no Mama to" (Japanese: 夏の秘密と私のママと)	Koto Nagata; Tadaaki Hōrai	Uiko Miura	August 3, 2011
4	4	"Even Though I'm an Idol, I Must Study!"; Transliteration: "Aidoru Datte Benkyō Suru!" (Japanese: アイドルだって勉強する!)	Koto Nagata; Tadaaki Hōrai	Uiko Miura	September 3, 2011
5	5	"Love School Festival"; Transliteration: "Koi Suru Gakuen-sai" (Japanese: 恋する学園祭)	Koto Nagata; Tadaaki Hōrai	Uiko Miura	October 3, 2011
6	6	"Asako's Secret"; Transliteration: "Asako no Shīkuretto" (Japanese: 麻子のシークレット)	Koto Nagata; Tadaaki Hōrai	Uiko Miura	November 2, 2011
7	7	"Always Next to Your Heart......"; Transliteration: "Itsumo Kokoro no Soba ni......" (Japanese: いつも心のそばに……)	Koto Nagata; Tadaaki Hōrai	Uiko Miura	December 1, 2011
8	8	"Even Though I'm an Idol, I Have Worries!"; Transliteration: "Aidoru Datte Nayamu no da!" (Japanese: アイドルだって悩むのだ!)	Koto Nagata; Tadaaki Hōrai	Uiko Miura	December 28, 2011
9	9	"Dangerous Valentine"; Transliteration: "Kiken na Barentain" (Japanese: 危険なバレンタイン)	Koto Nagata; Tadaaki Hōrai	Uiko Miura	February 3, 2012
10	10	"In a Pinch! A Spring of Total Annihilation"; Transliteration: "Pinchi! Zettai Zetsumei no Haru" (Japanese: ピンチ!絶体絶命の春)	Koto Nagata; Tadaaki Hōrai	Uiko Miura	March 3, 2012
11	11	"The Secret of Secret Girls"; Transliteration: "Shīkuretto Gāruzu no Shīkuretto" (Japanese: シークレットガールズのシークレット)	Koto Nagata; Tadaaki Hōrai	Uiko Miura	April 3, 2012
—	SP	"Secret Girls Harajuku Girls Detective Club"; Transliteration: "Shīkuretto Gāruzu no Harajuku Shōjo Tantei-dan" (Japanese: シークレットガールズの原宿少女探偵団)	Koto Nagata; Tadaaki Hōrai	Uiko Miura	December 2012

=== Season 2 (2012) ===
No. overall	No. in season	Title	Directed by	Written by	Original release date
12	1	"Rivals Appear?!"; Transliteration: "Raibaru Tōjō?!" (Japanese: ライバル登場!?)	Koto Nagata; Tadaaki Hōrai	Uiko Miura	July 3, 2012
13	2	"Asako's Prince"; Transliteration: "Asako no Ōji-sama" (Japanese: 麻子の王子さま)	Koto Nagata; Tadaaki Hōrai	Uiko Miura	July 3, 2012
14	3	"Even Though I'm an Idol, I Love Idols!"; Transliteration: "Aidoru datte, Aidoru ga Suki!" (Japanese: アイドルだって、アイドルが好き!)	Koto Nagata; Tadaaki Hōrai	Uiko Miura	August 3, 2012
15	4	"Idolizing a Super Model"; Transliteration: "Sūpā Moderu ni Akogarete" (Japanese: スーパーモデルに憧れて)	Koto Nagata; Tadaaki Hōrai	Uiko Miura	September 3, 2012
16	5	"Giving My All in Love and Exams"; Transliteration: "Koi mo Juken mo Zenryoku Tōkyū" (Japanese: 恋も受験も全力投球!)	Koto Nagata; Tadaaki Hōrai	Uiko Miura	October 3, 2012
17	6	"Below the One Roof"; Transliteration: "Hitotsu Yane no Shita" (Japanese: 一つ屋根の下)	Koto Nagata; Tadaaki Hōrai	Uiko Miura	November 2, 2012
18	7	"Feelings I Want to Convey"; Transliteration: "Tsutaetai Kimochi" (Japanese: 伝えたい気持ち)	Koto Nagata; Tadaaki Hōrai	Uiko Miura	December 1, 2012
19	8	"Goodbye, Secret Girls"; Transliteration: "Sayonara, Shīkuretto Gāruzu" (Japanese: さよなら、シークレットガールズ)	Koto Nagata; Tadaaki Hōrai	Uiko Miura	December 28, 2012
—	SP	"Secret Girls Harajuku Fashion Detective Club"; Transliteration: "Shīkuretto Gāruzu no Harajuku Fasshon Tantei-dan" (Japanese: シークレットガールズの原宿ファッション探偵団)	Koto Nagata; Tadaaki Hōrai	Uiko Miura	October 3, 2012

== Discography ==
Secret Girls briefly launched a singing career for the main cast of the show, where they released music under the group name Secret Girls and performed as their characters at live events. They held their first live concert in July 2011. They also performed at the Tokyo Idol Festival 2011 Eco & Smile event on April 6, 2012.

On March 21, 2012, they released the single "Secret Girls." The single contained the songs "Go! My Way!", "A Little Star", and "Change the World", which were featured in the show. The limited edition contained a DVD disc containing footage of their 2011 concert, a choreography lesson, and behind-the-scenes footage for their music videos.

=== Singles ===
List of singles, with selected chart positions, sales figures and certifications
Title	Year	Peak chart positions	Sales	Album
Title	Year	JPN	Sales	Album
"Secret Girls"	2012	22	—	Non-album single
"—" denotes releases that did not chart or were not released in that region.

== Other media ==
=== Manga ===
A manga adaptation by Pochi Kashiwa titled Secret Girls: Naisho no Idol (シークレットガールズ~ナイショのアイドル~) was serialized in the monthly magazine Ciao beginning with the September 2011 issue released on August 3, 2011, to the May 2013 issue released on April 3, 2013. The chapters were later released in 2 bound volumes by Shogakukan under the Ciao Comics imprint.

No.	Japanese release date	Japanese ISBN
1	June 29, 2012	978-4-0913-4623-0
2	April 30, 2013	978-4-0913-5273-6

=== Light novels ===
A light novel adaptation of Secret Girls is written by Uiko Miura, the show's screenwriter, with illustrations provided by Pochi Kashiwa, the author of the manga adaptation. The light novel series is published by Shogakukan under the Shogakukan Junior Bunko imprint.

No.	Title	Japanese release date	Japanese ISBN
1	Secret Girls: Birth of an Idol!! Shīkuretto Gāruzu: Aidoru Tanjō!! (シークレットガールズ アイドル誕生!!)	January 1, 2012	978-4-0923-0621-9
2	Secret Girls: Idol Close Call!! Shīkuretto Gāruzu: Aidoru Kiki Ippatsu!! (シークレットガールズ アイドル危機一髪!!)	April 2012	978-4-0923-0726-1
