= Naisho no Tsubomi =

Japanese manga series

- Cover of the first volume of Naisho no Tsubomi

ないしょのつぼみ
- Genre: Slice of life, romance, drama
- Manga
- Written by: Yū Yabūchi
- Published by: Shogakukan
- Magazine: Shougaku Gonensei
- Original run: 2005 – April 27, 2012
- Volumes: 8
- Original video animation
- Directed by: Akira Shigino
- Written by: Naruhisa Arakawa
- Studio: Studio Kikan (Note: Production assistance (制作協力) for all episodes provided by Studio Elle.)
- Licensed by: NA: Sentai Filmworks
- Released: April 25, 2008 – June 27, 2008
- Episodes: 3

Naisho no Tsubomi (ないしょのつぼみ; lit. Secret Tsubomi) is a Japanese slice of life romance shōjo manga series authored by Yū Yabūchi, and published by Shogakukan. 8 volumes were released in Japan, the last on April 27, 2012. An OVA anime for the series was released on April 24, 2008. A second OVA episode was released in June, 2008. The series received the 2009 Shogakukan Manga Award for children's manga. It was published in French by Delcourt. Sentai Filmworks released the OVA in North America in January 2018.

== Plot ==
Naisho no Tsubomi tells the story of Tsubomi Tachibana, a fifth grader dealing with rather sensitive issues such as her mother's pregnancy, her first period and the strange feelings she has started to get when around boys. When she first met Daiki, she tends to blush a lot when she is around him, she does not know what that feeling is at first, but further into the story she then discovers that she, in fact, has fallen in love with Daiki.

Each volume tells the story of a different girl, always with the given name of Tsubomi and similar appearance. In each case the story deals with various issues the girl experiences with early adolescence, including physical matters such as menstruation and breast development, personal issues such as the first crush, and more uncommon but dangerous issues such as the risk of predation (this was not included in the anime). Each story also includes some source of candid advice and information to support the girl, such as the spirit of a future sibling (volume 1), an alien posing as a twin brother (volume 2), or even another self from a parallel universe (volume 5).

== Main characters ==
Tsubomi Tachibana (立花 つぼみ, Tachibana Tsubomi)
A fifth grader who deals with sensitive issues while growing up. She is worried about the people around her and tries hard to help them when they are in need. This leads to her trying to handle issues such as her first menstruation alone. Although Tsubomi is a responsible and helpful girl, she is naive in a sense that she does not understand many things around her. She is happy about her mother's pregnancy, as she is an only child and has always wanted a sibling.
She is troubled about lot of things like the strange feelings that she has around Nemoto, the "indecent things" that her parents have done to make a baby, and her feelings towards Saya when she gets close to Nemoto. Tsubomi is shown to have feelings for Nemoto but does not quite know it herself at first. She later confesses to Nemoto, and the two become a couple.
Voiced by: Kaori Nazuka
Saya Endo (遠藤 沙耶, Endou Saya)
A beautiful new transfer student in Tsubomi's school and class. She knows many things and is a friendly character. She gets along with Tsubomi from the beginning of the story and acts like a sister to her by helping her with her problems. Not only she helps Tsubomi, she even helps Daiki. She seems more mature than other children of the same age.
Voiced by: Ami Koshimizu
Daiki Nemoto (根本 大樹, Nemoto Daiki)
He is friend of Futoshi and You. He calms Tsubomi down when she is going to see her mother and gives her a toy duck which she to attaches to her bag. He is nice and popular with girls, including those who are older than himself. He starts to have feelings for Tsubomi, and realizes them after they secretly see Yae and Yō kissing. Later in the series, Tsubomi confesses to Nemoto. He returns those feelings with his own, and the two become a couple.
Voiced by: Ryoko Shiraishi
Yae Yamabuki (山吹 八重, Yamabuki Yae)
Nicknamed "Yae-chin by her two best friends, Yamabuki Yae is tall, slim and calm. She is one of Tsubomi's best friends along with Rea-Pi. She is troubled by buying bras and her flat chest. She likes Saegusa and starts going out with him in chapter 5, and they kiss in chapter 9.
Voiced by: Sanae Kobayashi
Rea Katō (加藤 麗愛, Katou Rea)
She is small, hyperactive and very curious, mostly about perverted things. She is one of Tsubomi's best friends, along with Yae-chin, and Futoshi's childhood friend. She is teased by Futoshi about her body and weight frequently, which makes her want to be slim and beautiful, as her current body shape appears to be curvier than she would like. Her friend's nickname for her is "Rea-Pi".
Voiced by: Akemi Kanda
Yō Saegusa (三枝 葉, Saegusa You)
He is quiet, very popular and considered "the class idol". He has an older sister that helps Yae with her problems. He likes Yae and becomes her boyfriend in chapter 5, but they keep it a secret because many girls would be jealous.
Voiced by: Mitsuki Saiga
Futoshi Kuki (久木 太, Kuki Futoshi)
He is Yō and Daiki's friend, as well as Rae's childhood friend. He is perverted and often talks about big breasts. He takes apparent pleasure out of teasing Rea about her body shape and weight, though he actually likes her.
Voiced by: Kōki Miyata

== OVA episode list ==
Episode	Title	Synopsis
1	Babies Are a Secret.	
2	Boys♂ Girls♀	
3	Why We Fall in Love.	

== Reception ==
On manga-news.com, the staff gave it a grade of 14.63 out of 20.
