= Happy Happy Clover =

2005 slice of life manga series by Sayuri Tatsuyama

- Cover of the 5th volume of the manga, showing Clover and Rambler.

はぴはぴクローバー (Hapi Hapi Kurōbā)
- Genre: Comedy, family, slice of life
- Manga
- Written by: Sayuri Tatsuyama
- Published by: Shogakukan
- English publisher: NA: Viz Media
- Magazine: Ciao
- Original run: August 2005 – November 2008
- Volumes: 5
- Anime television series
- Directed by: Kazumi Nonaka
- Written by: Tetsuo Yasumi
- Studio: Group TAC
- Original network: TV Aichi; Tokyo MX; Kids Station
- Original run: 6 July 2007 – 28 September 2007
- Episodes: 13

Happy Happy Clover (はぴはぴクローバー, Hapi Hapi Kurōbā) is a Japanese slice of life manga series created and illustrated by Sayuri Tatsuyama, serialized in Shogakukan's shōjo magazine Ciao from August 2005 to November 2008. Five tankōbon volumes were serialized in April 2006 to November 2008. Viz Media currently holds the license for the manga series. An anime adaptation by Group TAC officially aired on TV Aichi from July 6 to 28 September 2007, adapting some of the chapters from the first three volumes.

== Summary ==
Chima is a young female rabbit who lives in the Crescent Moon Forest, a forest untouched by humans. Being friends with Gaku and Haru, she lives a rather good life but she desires to travel with Tabi-Usagi San, a male rabbit she adores but is deemed too young. One day when she is late for school, Gaku makes fun of her for being late. The same time, Professor Hoot announces the arrival of a new student: Meru. The four explore the forest they live in, getting in and out of trouble and learning things as they grow up while at the same time, Chima setting her goals to convince Tabi-Usagi San to take her along to his travels.

== Characters ==
Note: Characters' names in English are shown on the right

=== Main characters ===
Chima (ちま, Chima) / Clover
Voiced by: Sayaka Narita
The main protagonist of the series, a white rabbit with a heart-shaped puff of fur at her neckline and purple eyes, she wears a four leaf clover (given from a human) next to her left ear. Chima is a lively, happy bunny, who sometimes gets into trouble, dragging her friends along. She isn't very responsible sometimes and often her mistakes can escalate into bigger troubles in which she needs to resolve. She is also shown to be a scatterbrained, usually good at cooking and bad in sewing. In the epilogue, she ends up leaving Crescent Moon Forest to travel alongside Tabi-Usagi San.
Meru (メル, Meru) / Mallow
Voiced by: Tae Okajima
Chima's best friend, a light pink rabbit, with dark pink markings on her right eye all the way down to her right ear. With brown eyes and a big heart, Haru fell in love with her. She is calm, sweet, kind, and extremely intelligent. In the epilogue, she is married to Haru and had two children.
Gaku (ガク, Gaku) / Kale
Voiced by: Yumiko Kobayashi
A strong brown hare with amazing green eyes, he is older brother to the sextuplets, who has to help his parents take care of them. He is friendly and loyal, but a little mysterious. He secretly has a crush on Thistle and sticks up for his friend Haru. In the end, he marries Luka (ルカ, Ruka; Thistle) and they had a son named Taka (タカ, Taka; Chard).
Haru (ハル, Haru) / Shallot
Voiced by: Akeno Watanabe
A yellowish-orange rabbit with glasses, he is extremely smart and always seen with a book. Chima calls him a nerd, or, in other words, a bookworm. He has a secret side, which isn't all about knowledge and books. He supports his best friend Kale and has a crush on Meru. In the end of the series, he marries Meru and has a daughter named Miru (ミル, Miru; Yarrow) and a son named Arl (アル, Aru; Bergamot).
Tabi-Usagi San/Raul (旅うさぎさん/ラウル, Tabi-Usagi San/Rauru) / Rambler/Bramble
Voiced by: Takehito Koyasu
A male rabbit who often travels to different forests, and tells the other animals stories about his adventures, he is quite a bit older than all the other rabbits and may have a crush on Chima, who is supposed to travel with him when she gets older, but he always refuses. Later chapters reveal about his past when he was young, as when he was playing outside the forest he witnessed a fire caused by Humans that destroyed his home and killed off his parents. Since that incident, he has been traveling ever since and later told everything to Chima about his past suffering.
Professor Hoot (ホッホー先生, Hohhō Sensei)
Voiced by: Chō
Professor Hoot is the teacher of the kids in the Crescent Moon Forest. He is a brown-horned owl who is gruff, but secretly nice. He is known for his dreaded invitations to his home, which usually includes bitter health tea which all his students hate, and his long stories about his youth. His father is named Rouhohhoo.
Hirari (ひらり, Hirari) / Hickory
Voiced by: Rumi Shishido
Hirari is Chima's babysitter and a flying squirrel. Calm, cool, collected, and nice to everyone, he is also afraid of spiders and eats a lot, and is allergic to Yum Yum Mushrooms.

=== Minor characters ===
Chima's Family (ちまの家族, Chima no Kazoku) / Clover's Family
Voiced by: Kana Uetake (Chima's Mother), Tetsuharu Ōta (Chima's Father)
Chima's only parents and family, her father is a meteorologist and inventor while her mother is a renowned cook and admirer of her husband's inventions.
Tata (タタ, Tata) / Tip, Tete (テテ, Tete) / Top, Toto (トト, Toto) / Tap, Pupu (ププ, Pupu) / Flip, Pepe (ペペ, Pepe) / Flop and Popo (ポポ, Popo) / Flap
Voiced by: Yuka Nakatsukasa
Gaku's sextuplet younger brothers.
Yuta (ゆーた, Yuta) / Blackberry
Voiced by: Yoshihisa Kawahara
Yuta is a male Asian black bear cub who is a close friend of Chima and Gaku. His family specializes on making honey.
Bina (ビーナ, Bīna) / Forsythia
Voiced by: Miho Miyagawa
A female deer fawn, who is closely friends with Chima and Meru.
Charaku (チャラク, Charaku) / Cinnamon
Voiced by: Tatsuhisa Suzuki
A fox who is one of the forest's biggest pranksters, he lies to the denizens of the forest and is often seen with Kururi with their schemes, but sometimes falls flat when Chima busts them.
Kururi (クルリ, Kururi) / Twirl
Voiced by: Ai Shimizu
Charaku's friend and partner in crime, he is a squirrel who also likes to pull pranks on the denizens of the forest, but like Charaku, he also fails when busted.
Hiyo (ヒーヨ, Hīyo) and Dori (ドリー, Dorī) /Skye and Cloud
Voiced by: Tetsuharu Ōta (Hiyo), Yoshihisa Kawahara
Also known as the "Bulbull Brothers", they are a pair of rapping brown-eared bulbul who sometimes annoys Chima and her friends and often competes with them.
Elle (エル, Eru) /Violet
Voiced by: Kotomi Iwamura
Elle is Haru's older sister, who has a calm demeanor like him and likes flowers, especially light grass flowers. Roy, her childhood friend appears to have a crush on him. She studies the lifespan of fireflies.

== Media ==
=== Manga ===
The manga was originally created by Sayuri Tatsuyama. It was first serialized in the August 2005 issue of Ciao and later collected in five tankōbon volumes. Viz Media licensed the manga in 2009 and all 5 volumes were being released in English and later released through Amazon Kindle for digital distribution. The manga later gained a French translation in 2016 where the manga is called "Happy Clover" and is distributed by Nobi-Nobi.

==== Volume list ====
No.	Original release date	Original ISBN	English release date	English ISBN
1	April 28, 2006	978-4-09-130406-3	February 3, 2009	978-1-4215-2656-0
2	February 1, 2007	978-4-09-130809-2	June 2, 2009	978-1-4215-2657-7
3	June 29, 2007	978-4-09-131226-6	October 6, 2009	978-1-4215-2658-4
4	April 28, 2008	978-4-09-131700-1	February 2, 2010	978-1-4215-2735-2
5	December 26, 2008	978-4-09-132273-9	June 1, 2010	978-1-4215-2736-9

=== Anime ===
An anime adaptation was aired from July 6 to September 28, 2007, on Kids Station and TV Aichi in Japan. It was directed by Kazumi Nonaka and the anime only adapts the first 3 volumes of the manga, only lasting for 13 episodes. The opening song is titled "Shiawase no Kakera" (シアワセのカケラ; lit. Pieces of Dreams) by Marimomi, while the ending theme is titled "Aiiro no Sora no Shita de" (藍色の空の下で; lit. Under the Indigo Sky) by Mikuni Shimokawa.

==== Episode list ====
No.	Title (Note: Some English titles are taken from the manga.)	Original release date
1	"Welcome to Crescent Moon Forest / Crescent Moon Forest House Visit"; Transliteration: "Mikadzukimori ni yōkoso/ Mikadzukimori no otaku hōmon" (Japanese: 三日月森にようこそ / 三日月森のお宅訪問)	6 July 2007
Welcome to Crescent Moon Forest: At school, Meru is introduced. Meru gets herself lost in Saw Valley, until Chima and her friends come to help. Crescent Moon Forest House Visit: Meru comes to visit Chima's house. After that they visit Haru, then Gaku. Professor Hohhoo then invites them over to his house.
2	"Tabi-Usagi San has Arrived! / Let's Take Out the Monster~!"; Transliteration: "Tabi Usagi-san tōjō! / Kaibutsu o yattsukero〜!" (Japanese: 旅うさぎさん登場! / 怪物をやっつけろ〜!)	13 July 2007
Tabi-Usagi San has Arrived!: Chima and her friends introduce Meru to Tabi-Usagi San. Chima learns a valuable lesson from him about cherishing her home. Let's Take Out the Monster~!: A terrifying monster has been sighted in the forest. Chima and her friends battle the monster and find it was a scheme by Charaku and Kururi to hoard all the spring cones.
3	"The Secret of the Spring / Chima's a Postman!?"; Transliteration: "Izumi no himitsu!? / Chima wa yūbin ya-san!?" (Japanese: 泉のひみつ!? / ちまは郵便やさん!?)	20 July 2007
The Secret of the Spring: Chima and her friends stumble across a lake, which Charaku claims is cursed. Hirari shows Chima that is not the case. Chima's a Postman!?: Haru has developed a crush on Meru and asks Chima to deliver a letter to her. Things go wrong when Chima loses the letter and everyone hears about it.
4	"Meru's Feelings / Battle with the Hiyodori Brothers!"; Transliteration: "Meru no kimochi / Hiyodori kyōdai to shōbu!" (Japanese: メルのきもち / ヒヨドリ兄弟と勝負!)	27 July 2007
Meru's Feelings: Meru breaks her leg in a sledding accident while trying to be brave like Chima. Being a good natured sort, Meru finds that Kururi can be a nice squirrel. Battle with the Hiyodori Brothers!: Chima and her friends race against the Hiyodori brothers to deliver a letter for Professor Hohhoo's father.
5	"The Birth of the Bunny Postal Service! / A Large Package!?"; Transliteration: "Usa posuto-tai kessei! / Ōkina ni motsu!?" (Japanese: うさポスト隊結成! / 大きなにもつ!?)	3 August 2007
The Birth of the Bunny Postal Service!: Chima and her friends start up their Bunny Postal Service. They find out that a hare named Roy is in love with Haru's sister Elle. A Large Package!?: Gaku's sextuplet brothers disguise themselves as a package to get their brother's attention, but the Hiyodori brothers make off with the basket they are hiding in.
6	"The Tests are a Secret?! / A Race with Tabi Usagi-san!"; Transliteration: "Tesuto wa himitsu/ Tabi Usagi-san to rēsu!" (Japanese: テストはひみつ / 旅うさぎさんとレース!)	10 August 2007
The Tests are a Secret?!: Chima and most of her classmates have failed their tests. They try to hide their tests papers, but discover that this is not the first instance. A Race with Tabi Usagi-san!: Chima challenges Tabi-Usagi San to a race in hope of going with him. A storm threatens both their lives and Tabi-Usagi San shows his true strength.
7	"An Important Helper Appears! / Finding Hirari's Weakness!"; Transliteration: "Ōmono suketto tōjō! / Hirari-san no jakuten hakken!" (Japanese: 大物助っ人登場! / ひらりさんの弱点発見!)	17 August 2007
An Important Helper Appears!: Things take a turn for the worse as the Bunny Postal Service piles up and Chima eventually gets her injured. In the midst of her injuries, Tabi-Usagi San steps in to help. Finding Hirari's Weakness!: Hirari remains calm and unmoved by Chima's tricks as she tries to surprise him, but then the flying squirrel disappears.
8	"A Cute Ghost / Save the Grass Lights!"; Transliteration: "Kawaī obake / Akari kusa o mamore!" (Japanese: カワイイおばけ / あかり草をまもれ!)	24 August 2007
A Cute Ghost: There is talk of a ghost in the dark thicket. The little ghost turns out to be Mr. Mole's son Maumau who got a bad haircut from his father. Save the Grass Lights!: Chima decides she and her friends should grow Grass Lights to avoid nasty accidents. A rainstorm threatens to destroy their cultivation.
9	"Chima's First Challenge! / Hirari's Vacation"; Transliteration: "Chima no hatsu chōsen / Hirari-san no bakansu" (Japanese: ちまの初挑戦 / ひらりさんのバカンス)	31 August 2007
Chima's First Challenge!: Chima tries hard to make an apple pie for Heru. She is disappointed that Bina's apple pie is better than hers, but Chima realities that the thought is what really counts. Hirari's Vacation: Hirari goes to visit his old friend Furari for a week. Both Chima and Hirari miss each other, but Hirari arrives in time to save Chima from a nasty fall.
10	"Dad Teaches School for a Day / The Bunny Postal Service in High Demand!"; Transliteration: "Papa no tsuitachi sensei / Usa posuto-tai, hippari-dako" (Japanese: パパの一日先生 / うさポスト隊、ひっぱりだこ)	7 September 2007
Dad Teaches School for a Day: In Professor Hohhoo's absence, the father of one student becomes teacher for a day. Chima's dad's teaching becomes an embarrassment for Chima, but he manages to show the class he can be amazing. The Bunny Postal Service in High Demand!: The Bunny Postal Services are needed more than ever in the coming winter. The Moles' underground network aids Chima and her friends. They show a dedication for their hard work.
11	"Sextuplet Warning! / Chima House-Sits!"; Transliteration: "Mutsugo chūihō! / Chima no orusu ban" (Japanese: 六つ子注意報! / ちまのおるす番)	14 September 2007
Sextuplet Warning!: Chima babysits Gaku's baby brothers, but they cause trouble for her. Both Chima and the sextuplets make up. Chima House-Sits!: Hoping to get a break from chores, Chima and her friends house-sit in her residence. Chima soon finds it hard to look after herself and realizes the importance of responsibility.
12	"Chima, Knits a Muffler / The Strange Large Thief!"; Transliteration: "Chima, mafurā o amu / Kimyōna dai doro bō!" (Japanese: ちま、マフラーを編む / 奇妙な大どろぼう!)	21 September 2007
Chima, Knits a Muffler: Hirari catches a cold. Chima wants to knit him a muffler. The knitting project becomes seems complicated at first, but Meru's teaching to knit pays off. The Strange Large Thief!: A thief is on the loose. Hoping to gain respect, Charaku and Kururi try to find the thief, but it turns out that the Sextuplets were providing for an injured wolf.
13	"Go, Haru! / Here Comes the Spring Festival!"; Transliteration: "Ganbare Haru! / Harutsugematsuri ga yattekuru!" (Japanese: がんばれハル! / 春告祭がやってくる!)	28 September 2007
Go, Haru!: Haru reminisces the time he first met Chima and Gaku. He learned that the two rabbits were better friends than his books. Here Comes the Spring Festival!: The Spring Festival is fast approaching, but Chima is not ready to play or sing for it. With encouragement from her friends, she sings away on stage.

== Games ==
There are two games, both released only in Japan.

ちゃおドリームタッチ! ハッピーあにばーさりー (Ciao Dream Touch! Happy Anniversary)
- Nintendo DS
- 7 December 2006
- Marvelous Interactive
はぴはぴクローバー (Happy Happy Clover)
- Nintendo DS
- 14 February 2008
- Nippon Columbia Games
