= ChuChu (magazine) =

Japanese manga magazine

- Cover of issue #9 of 2008, featuring Yomogi Mochi Yake Ta? by Kiyoko Arai
- Categories: Shōjo manga
- Frequency: Monthly
- First issue: December 2005
- Final issue: December 2009
- Company: Shogakukan
- Country: Japan
- Based in: Tokyo
- Language: Japanese
- Website: Official website (archived)

ChuChu was a Japanese shōjo manga magazine published by Shogakukan for 11–14-year-old girls. ChuChu became a monthly magazine in December 2005. Shogakukan canceled ChuChu on December 28, 2009.

== Manga artists and series featured in ChuChu ==
- Kiyoko Arai
  - Yomogi Mochi Yake Ta?
- Nimi Fujita
  - Choco to Mint to'
- Kirara Himekawa
- Natsumi Kawahara
- Naoto Kohaku
- Yukino Miyawaki
  - NG Boy x Paradice
- Aqua Mizuto
  - ALMIGHTY x 10
- Kaya Nanashima
  - Makimodoshi no Koi no Uta
- Miyuki Ohbayashi
  - Sakura Zensen
- Kei Ouri
- Takemaru Sasami
  - Itako Chan
  - Doki Doki Zukins
- Mikiko Satsuki
  - Koi Pazzle
- Miwako Sugiyama
  - Royal Green
  - Mitsuboshi Love Days
- Naomi Uramoto
  - Nattoku Ponchi
- Tae Usami
  - Otome no Heart mo Kane Shidai
- Yuu Yabuchi
  - Anicon
  - Hitohira no Koi ga Furu
