= Yū Yabūchi =

Japanese manga artist (born 1969)

- Born: 1 December 1969 (age 56); Nishinomiya, Hyogo, Japan
- Occupation: Manga artist
- Website: Utopia

Yū Yabūchi (やぶうち 優, Yabūchi Yū; born 1 December 1969 in Nishinomiya) is a Japanese manga artist who specializes in shōjo manga. Yū Yabuchi's most famous works are Mizuiro Jidai, Shōjo-Shōnen, and Naisho no Tsubomi. The main focus of her manga are the emotional and psychological growth of preteen girls and boys and early romances between them. Her works are popular among preteen and teenage girls. She received the 2009 Shogakukan Manga Award for children's manga for Naisho no Tsubomi.

Her favorites subjects to draw are trains and birds (especially the Java sparrow).

== Works ==
- Ani-Com
- Ao No Iris
- Chiko no Negai
- Dolly Kanon
- EVE Shōjo no Tamago
- Gekikawa Devil
- Hatsukoi Shinan
- Hitohira no Koi ga Furu
- Karen
- Kimi ga Mai Orite Kita
- Kimi ni Straight
- Koi wo Kanaderu Kisetsu
- Mahochū!
- Midori no Tsubasa
- Mizuiro Jidai
- Naisho no Tsubomi
- Ocharakahoi
- Ojōsama ni wa Kanawanai
- Onegai! Maruchi-kun
- Pure Pure
- Shōjo Shōnen
- Sorairo Memorial
- Tonda Shinkiroku
- Uesugi-kun Wants to Quit Being a Girl
