= Ebersberg (disambiguation) =

Ebersberg is a town in Bavaria, Germany.

Ebersberg may also refer to:

- Ebersberg (district), around the Bavarian town
- Ebersberg (Rhön), a mountain in Hesse, Germany
- Fort Ebersberg, Switzerland, a 1940 fort near the German border
- Ebersberg (Deister), a hill on the Deister ridge overlooking the Deister Gap, Germany

== Seem also ==
- Ebersburg, Hesse, Germany, a municipality
