= Giroud =

Giroud is a French surname. Notable people with the surname include:

- Alberto Bayo y Giroud (1892–1967), Cuban military leader and writer
- Françoise Giroud (1916–2003), French journalist, screenwriter, writer and politician
- Frank Giroud (1956–2018), French comics writer
- Jean-Pierre Giroud (born 1938), French geotechnical engineer and geosynthetics pioneer
- Olivier Giroud (born 1986), French footballer
- Pavel Giroud (born 1973), Cuban film director
- Thibault Giroud (born 1974), French rugby union coach

== See also ==
- Fort de Pré-Giroud, twentieth-century Swiss fortification located in the Jura Mountains
- Giroux, a similar surname
