= Canon de 75 CA modèle 1940 Schneider =

Canon de 75 mm contre aéronefs Schneider, modèle 1940
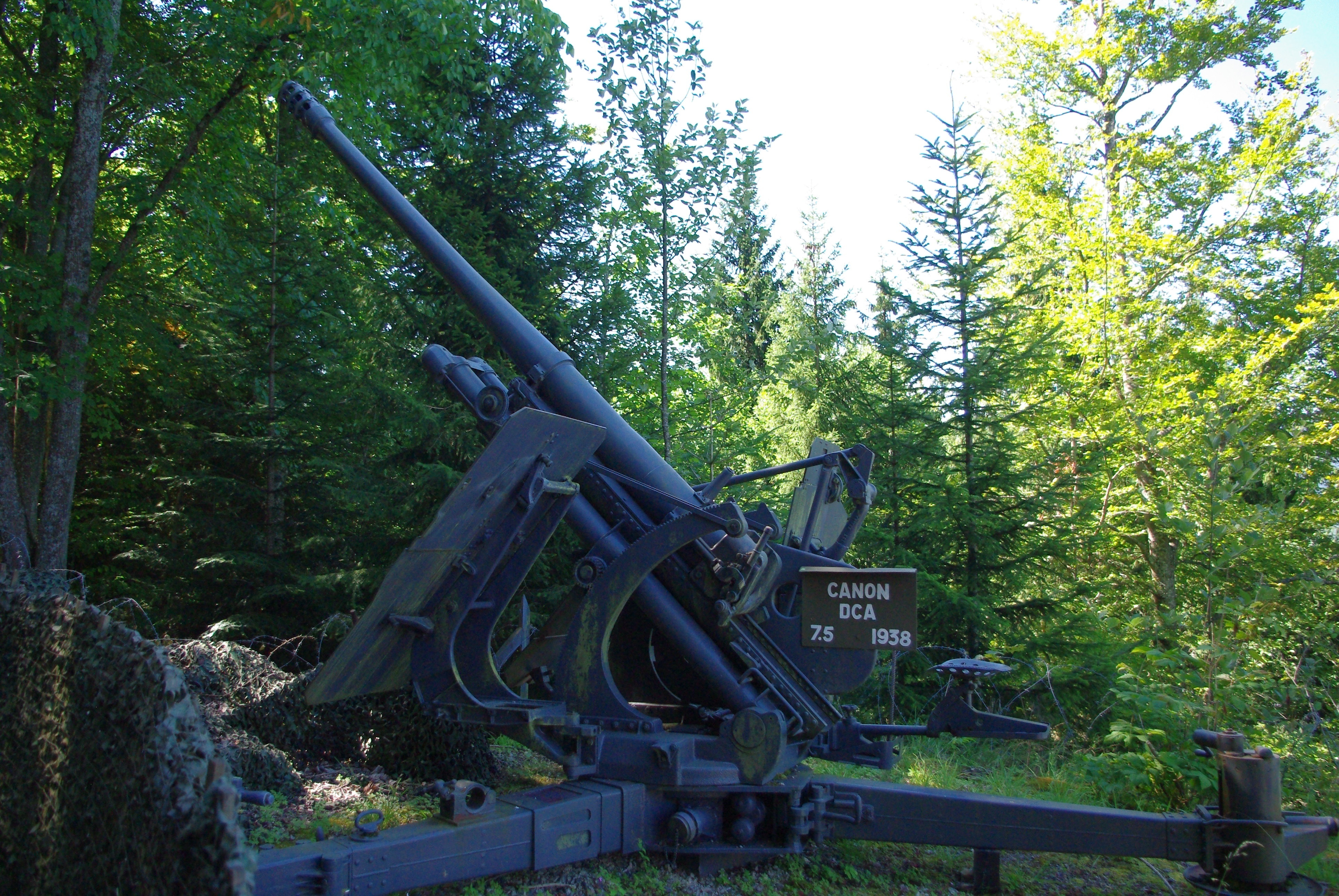
- Canon de 75 mm contre aéronefs modèle 1939 at fort de Pré-Giroud.
- Type: Anti-aircraft gun
- Place of origin: France

Service history
- Used by: See § Users
- Wars: Second World War

Production history
- Designer: Schneider et Cie
- Designed: 1928–1934
- Manufacturer: Schneider et Cie; K + W
- Developed from: Canon de 75 antiaérien modèle 1913–1917
- Produced: 1934–1940
- No. built: 192?

Specifications
- Mass: Travel: 5,300 kg (11,700 lb); Combat: 3,800 kg (8,400 lb)
- Length: Travel: 7 m (23 ft)
- Barrel length: 4 m (13 ft) L/53
- Width: Travel: 1.5 m (4 ft 11 in)
- Crew: 9
- Shell: 75 × 518 mm R high-explosive, air-burst
- Shell weight: 6.4 kg (14 lb)
- Caliber: 75 mm (3 in)
- Breech: vertical sliding-block
- Recoil: Hydro-pneumatic, variable (500-580 mm)
- Carriage: single axle with three outriggers
- Elevation: 0-70°
- Traverse: 360°
- Rate of fire: 20-30 rpm
- Muzzle velocity: 685–715 m/s (2,250–2,350 ft/s)
- Effective firing range: 8.2 km (27,000 ft)

The Canon de 75 contre aéronefs modèle 1940 Schneider was a French 75 mm anti-aircraft gun designed and manufactured by Schneider et Cie at Le Creusot. These guns were used by the French Army during the Second World War.

== History ==
The origins of the modèle 1940 go back to the Canon de 75 modèle 1897 field gun which was first employed on improvised anti-aircraft mounts during World War I. Later in the war specialized anti-aircraft mounts were developed.

These included:

- Autocanon de 75 mm antiaérien mle 1913 – a self-propelled version, on the back of a De Dion-Bouton truck chassis.
- Canon de 75 mm antiaérien sur plate-forme mle 1915– a pit mounted high-angle steel girder framework with 360° traverse. There was also a version with a rotating platform mounted on a concrete pedestal.
- Canon de 75 mm contre aéronefs sur remorque mle 1917 – a single-axle towed version with three outriggers. This had all fire-control equipment mounted on the carriage and was a Schneider design.

During the late 1920s it was realized that these Canon de 75 antiaérien mle 1913-1917 were outmoded as an anti-aircraft weapon and development of a new gun barrel was begun in 1928. The goals of the rearmament program were faster rate of fire, higher muzzle velocity, increased vertical range, modern fire control and greater mobility with new gun carriages. However the priority for armaments at that time was the construction of the Maginot Line fortifications and work progressed at a slow pace. This slow pace and lack of funds meant all three anti-aircraft versions of the mle 1897 were still in use in large numbers when World War II began in 1939. It is estimated that 913 un-modernized mle 1897 anti-aircraft guns were still in service in 1940.

== Modernizations ==
Some of the first guns to be upgraded were the fixed emplacements around high priority targets such as Paris. These mle 1915s had their barrels replaced with new 53 caliber barrels built by Schneider. The remaining mle 1913, mle 1915 and mle 1917 guns kept the old mle 1897 barrel but had their fire systems replaced to produce the Auto-canon de 75 mm mle 13/34, Canon de 75 mm mle 15/34 and Canon de 75 mm contre aéronefs mle 17/34.

== New Models ==
In addition to the upgraded guns there were also newly built guns and carriages. These guns had a secondary anti-tank role when fitted with a 6X scope, despite a lack of armor-piercing ammunition. It is estimated that 192 new guns were in service in 1940.

- Canon de 75 mm contre aéronefs mle 30 – similar to the mle 1917 carriage, except for modern fire-control equipment mounted off the gun carriage.
- Canon de 75 mm contre aéronefs mle 32 – modern four wheeled carriage with two sprung axles that was capable of being towed at speeds of up to 40 km/h (25 mp/h).
- Canon de 75 mm contre aéronefs mle 33 – two wheeled sprung single axle with cruciform folding outriggers and firing platform.
- Canon de 75 mm contre aéronefs mle 36
- Canon de 75 mm contre aéronefs mle 39
- Canon de 75 mm contre aéronefs mle 40

== German Use ==
Large numbers of 75 mm guns were captured by Germany after the French defeat in 1940. Guns in German service were given the designations:

- 7.5 cm FK 97(f) – These were un-modernized mle 1897 guns. Some were sold to Axis satellites, some were converted to 7.5 cm Pak 97/38 anti-tank guns and others were integrated into Atlantic Wall defenses.
- 7.5 cm Flak M.17/34(f) – These were modernized mle 17/34 guns that remained in German service as anti-aircraft guns.
- 7.5 cm Flak M.30(f) – These were mle 30 guns that remained in German service as anti-aircraft guns.
- 7.5 cm Flak M.32(f) – These were mle 32 guns that remained in German service as anti-aircraft guns.
- 7.5 cm Flak M.33(f) – These were mle 33 guns that remained in German service as anti-aircraft guns.
- 7.5 cm Flak M.36(f) – These were mle 36 guns that remained in German service as anti-aircraft guns.

== Users ==
- France
- Nazi Germany

== Photo Gallery ==
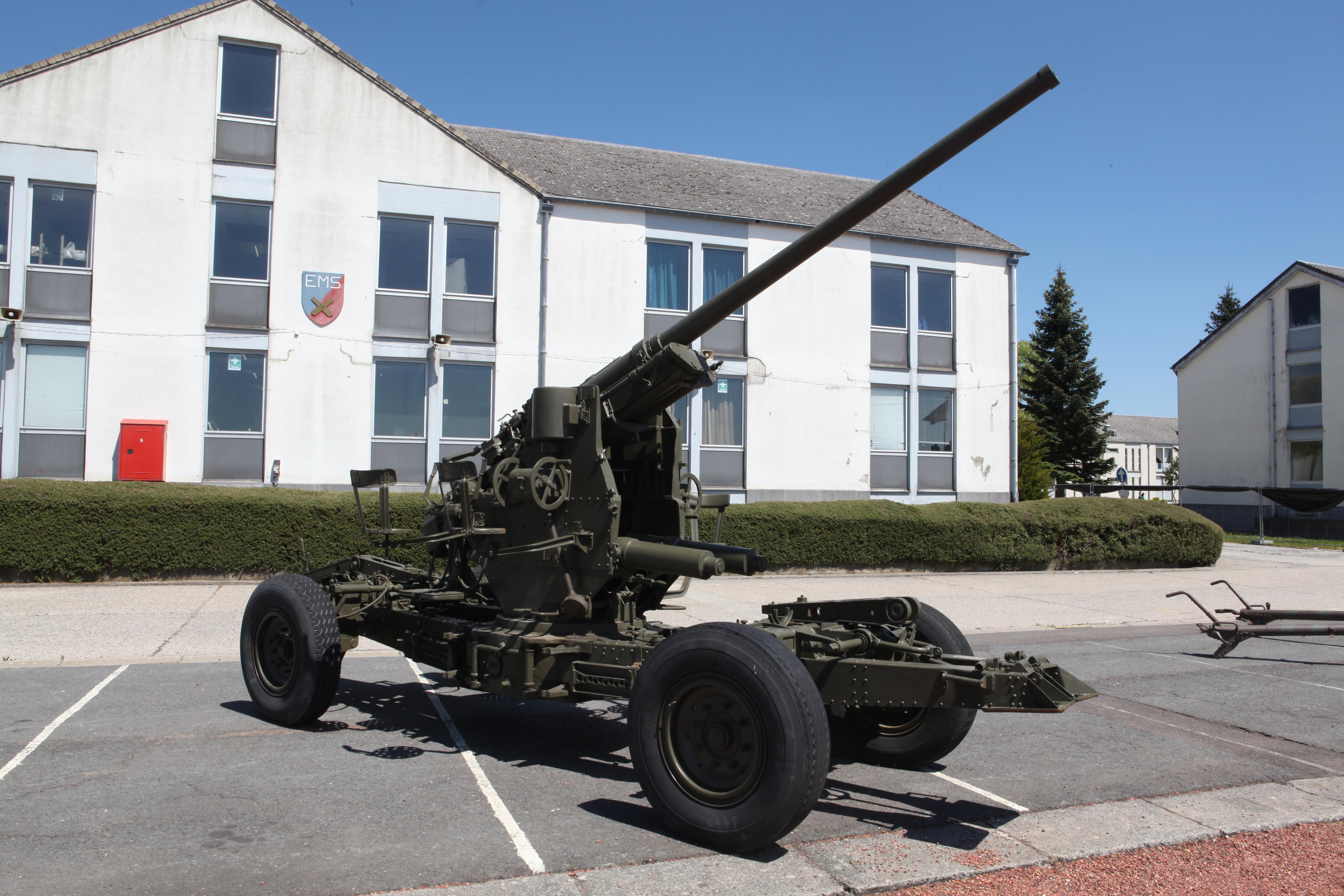
Canon anti-aérien de 75mm modèle 1932.

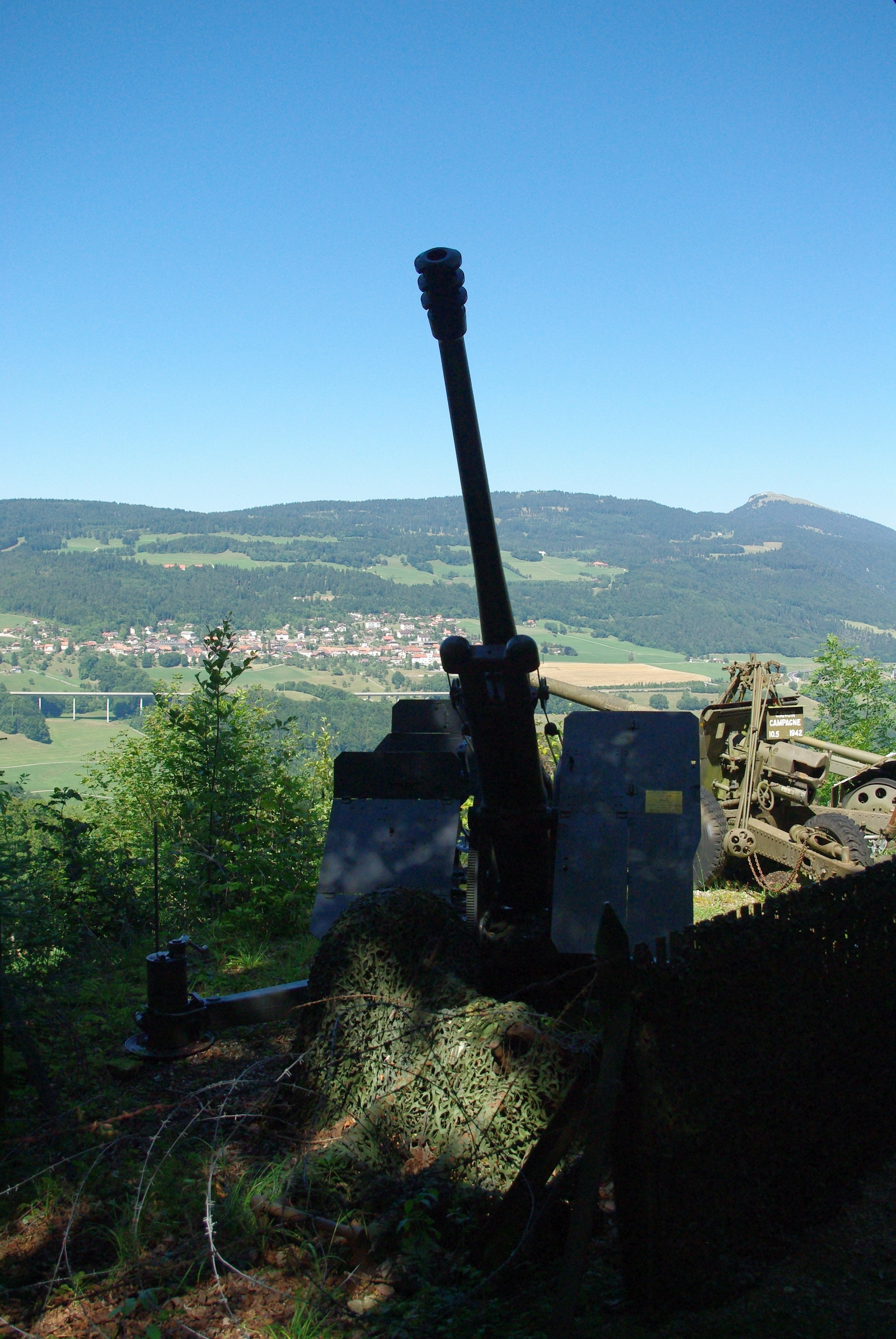
Canon anti-aérien de 75mm modèle 1938 at fort de Pré-Giroud.

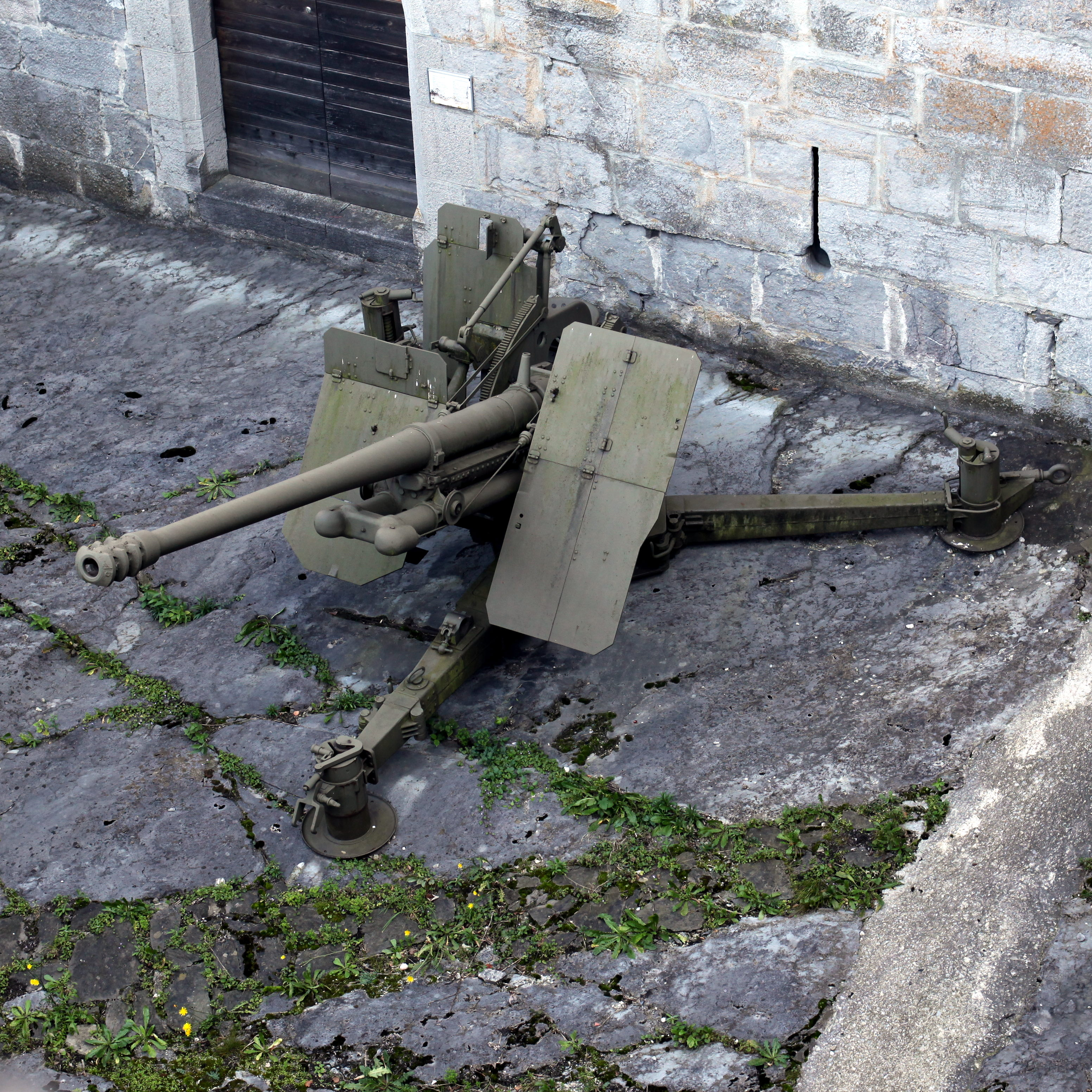
Canon anti-aérien de 75mm modèle 1939, on display at Saint-Maurice Castle.
