= Fort Reuenthal =

Historical museum in Full-Reuenthal (AG), Switzerland

- Part of Swiss Border Line
- Northern Switzerland
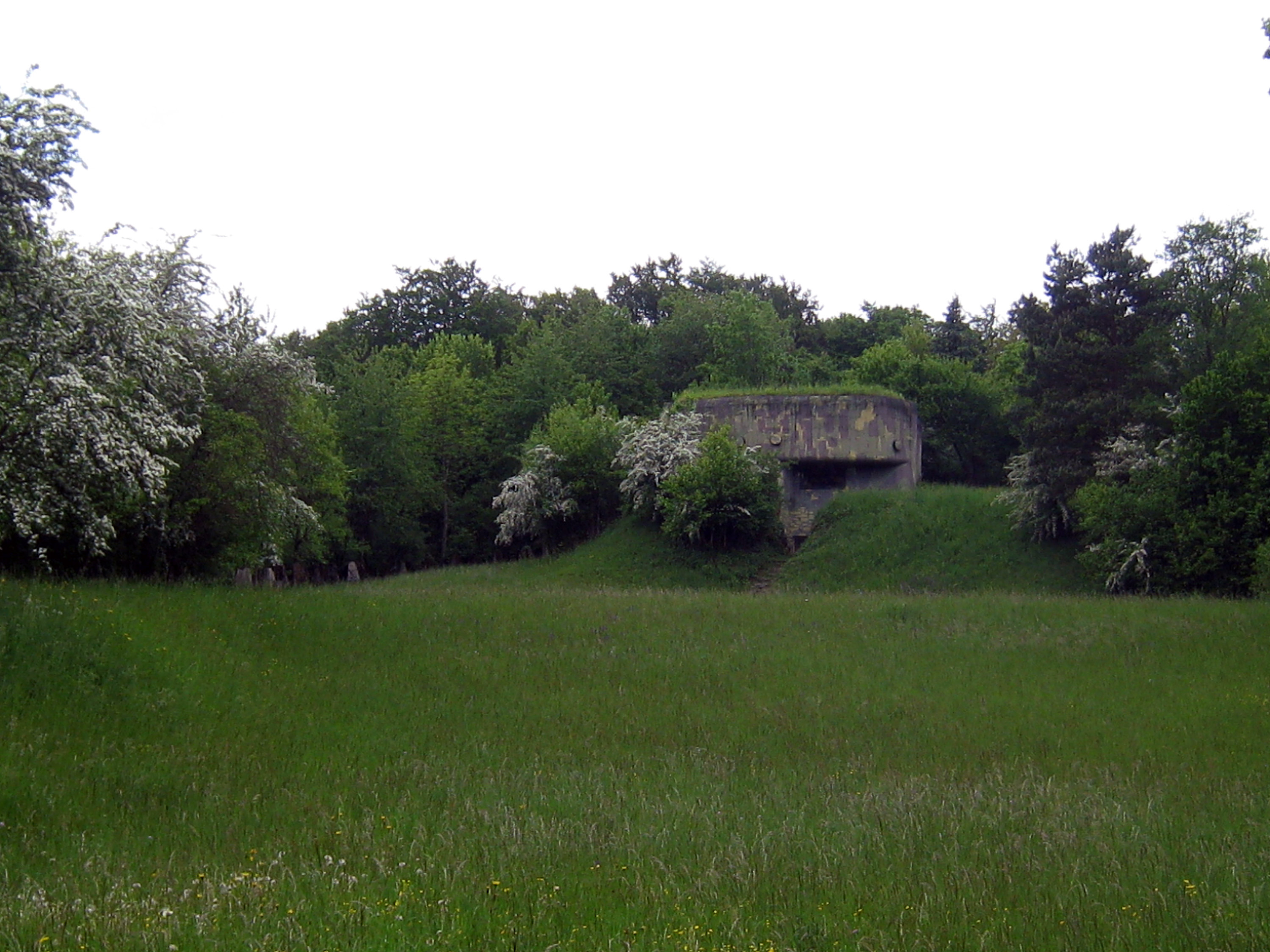

Site information
- Owner: Private
- Controlled by: Switzerland
- Open to the public: Yes
- Condition: Preserved

Location
- Coordinates: 47.60476°N 8.20223°E

Site history
- Built: 1939
- Materials: Concrete, deep excavation

Fort Reuenthal is a 20th-century Swiss fortification located in the Aargau canton near the Swiss border with Germany. Built between 1937 and 1939, the fort overlooks the Rhine where it bends around the town of Full-Reuenthal, and was intended to prevent a crossing of the Rhine at the hydroelectric plant at Dogern. It was a component of the Swiss Border Line of defenses. It is armed with two artillery blocks for 75 mm guns and two machine gun blocks. The fort uses camouflage, with house-like superstructures over some positions. Deactivated as a military post in 1988, it is operated as a museum.

== Description ==
Fort Reuenthal is located just south of Full-Reuenthal. It overlooks the Rhine and the hydroelectric station spanning the river at Dogern. It is part of the Border Line defenses built by Switzerland in the late 1930s, prior to a shift in Swiss priorities to the National Redoubt in the Alps. Work on the fort was started in 1937, and completed in 1939.

The fort's armament comprised two artillery blocks with 75 mm guns and three machine gun blocks.

== Present situation ==
Fort Reuenthal is operated by the Swiss Military Museum (Schweizerisches Militärmuseum Full), whose display facility is located about .9 kilometres (0.56 mi) away in the direction of the Leibstadt Nuclear Power Plant.

== Gallery ==
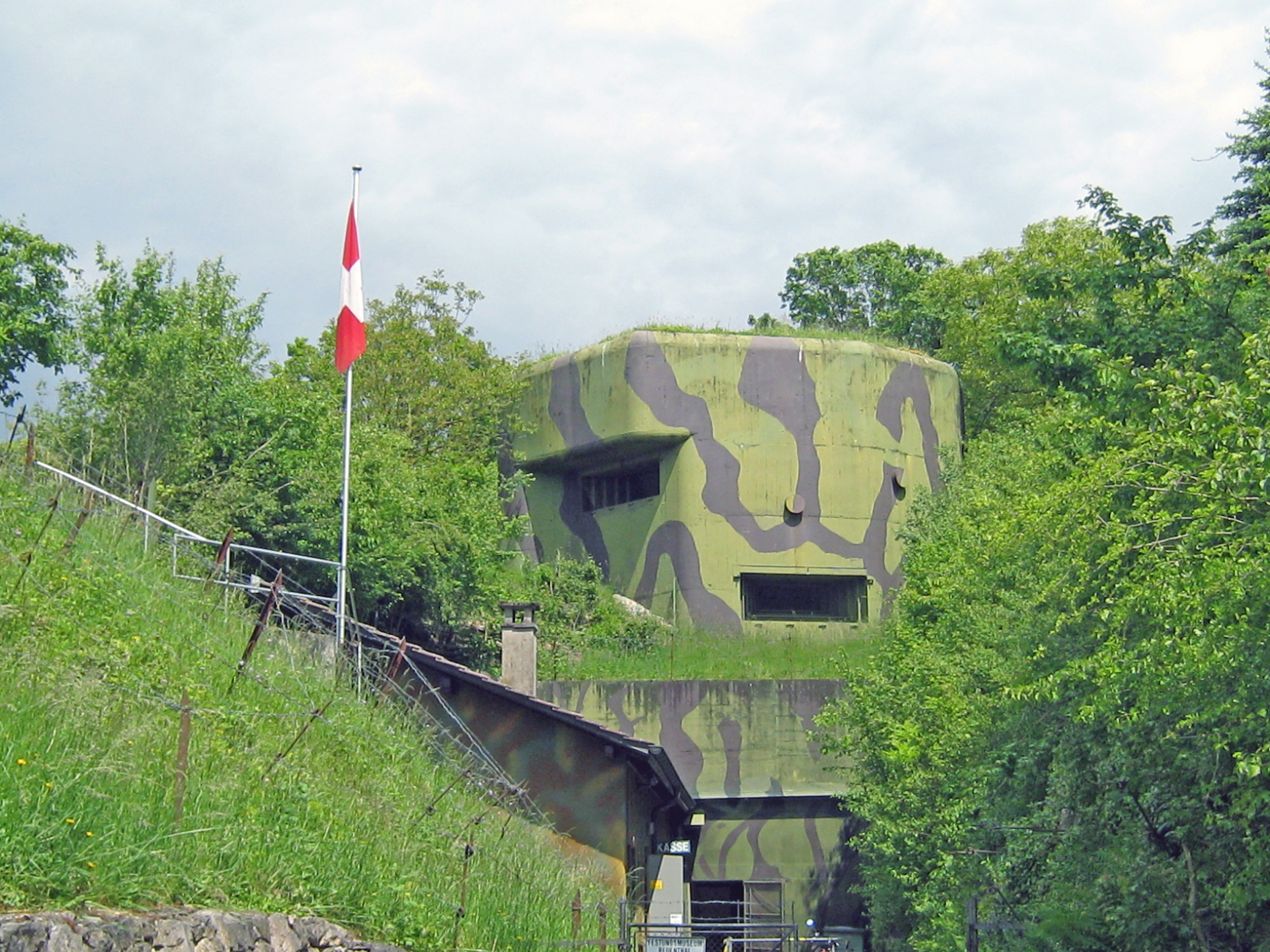

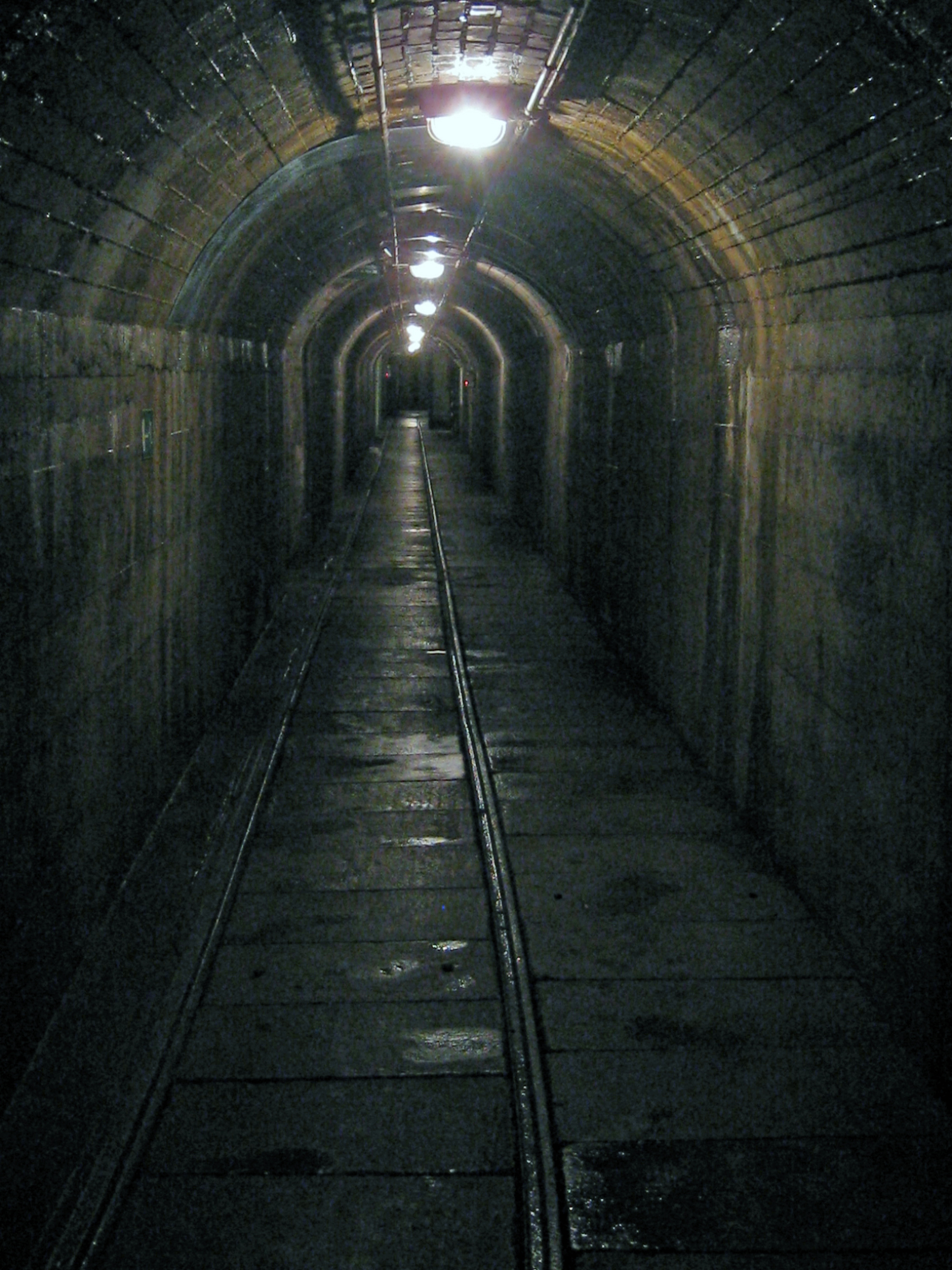

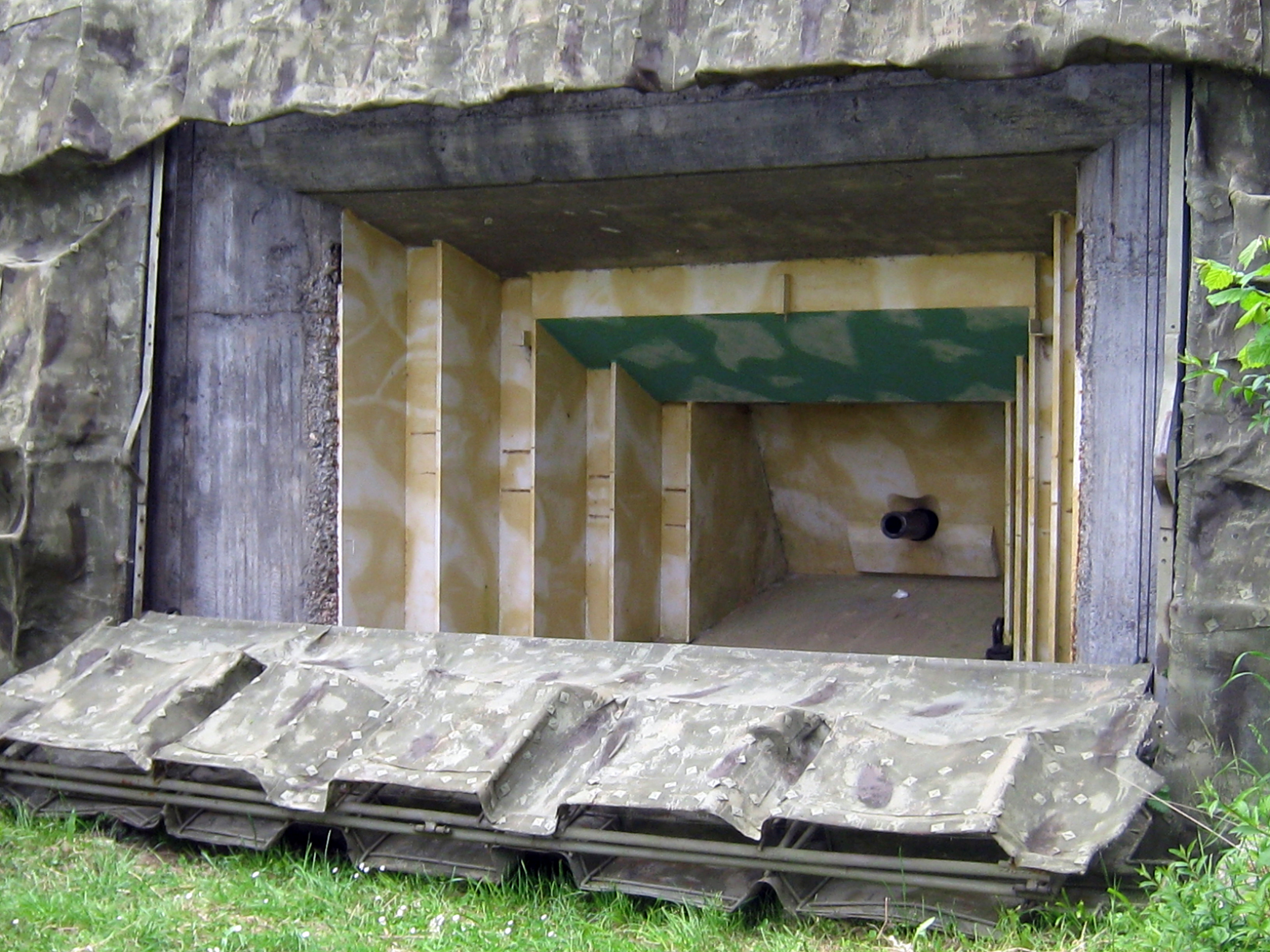

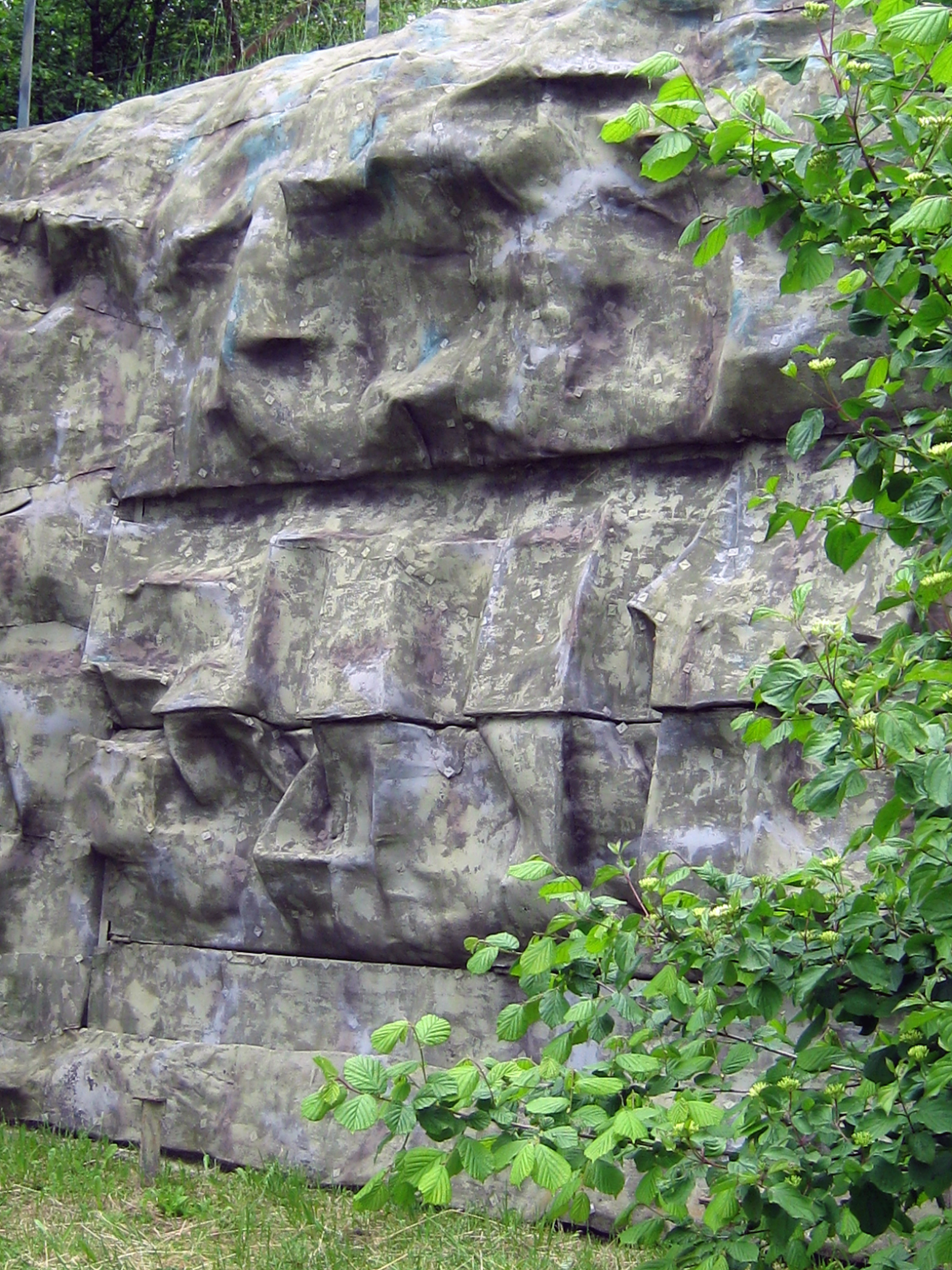

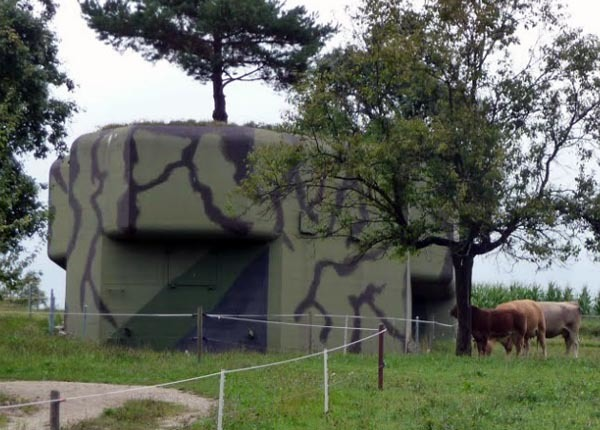

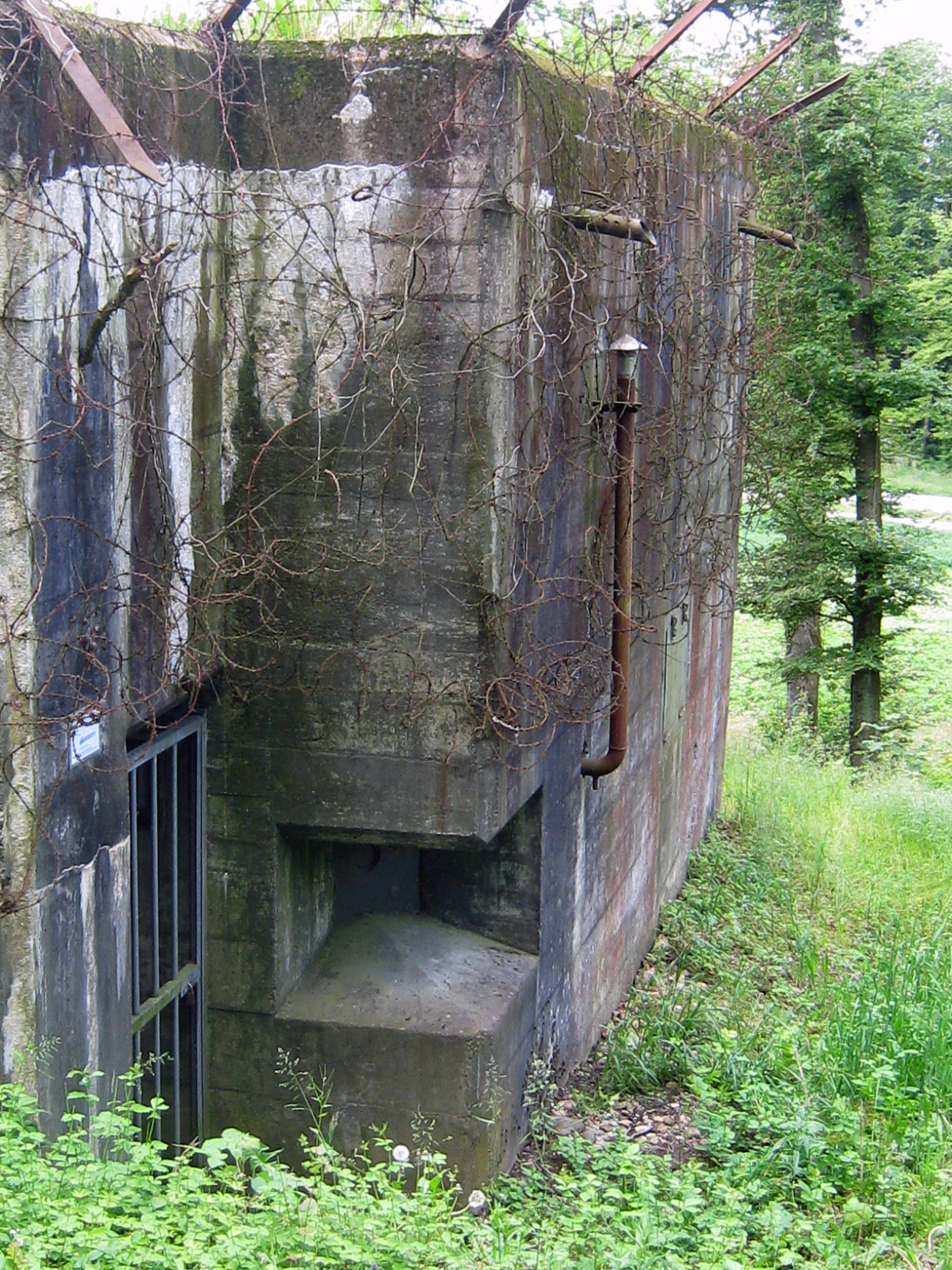
