= Fort Heldsberg =

Historical museum in St. Margrethen (Switzerland)

- Part of Swiss Border Line
- Northern Switzerland
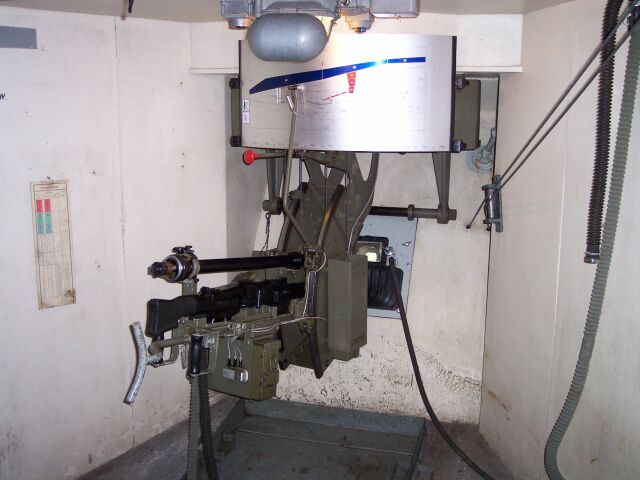
- Machine gun position at Fort Heldsberg

Site information
- Owner: Town of St. Margrethen
- Controlled by: Switzerland
- Open to the public: Yes
- Condition: Preserved

Location
- Coordinates: 47.44278°N 9.64389°E

Site history
- Built: 1940
- Materials: Concrete, deep excavation

Fort Heldsberg was built 1938–1940 near St. Margrethen in Switzerland, overlooking the Rhine, which forms the Swiss-Austrian border at that location, just south of Lake Constance. The fort was part of the Swiss Border Line defenses, built between 1938 and 1941. Since 1993 it is a museum.

== Concept ==
In March 1938, Austria was annexed by Germany under the Anschluss, creating a new, potentially hostile section of frontier. The fort at Heldsberg was planned to stop or delay an attack across the nearby Rhine, as well as providing artillery coverage on the southern end of Lake Constance.

The German plan for a Swiss invasion, Operation Tannenbaum, noted the presence of the Heldsberg position and concluded:

A very desirable approach is to attack from the east at Rheineck, the shortest way to the enemy flank, but the mountainous terrain and the strong fortifications at Rheineck (Heldsberg) promise no success.

However, the Border Line fortifications shared common faults, including less-than-thorough attention to details of armor and protection, and a forward-facing position that left the positions vulnerable to direct return fire. By comparison with the Maginot Line, the positions were less well-protected and lacked the ability to fire laterally along the line of attack from a sheltered location. The Border Line forts did not deploy a defense in depth.

== Description ==
Heldsberg was armed with four 75mm guns, mounted in individual concrete blockhouses, supported by five machine gun blocks, divided into north and south batteries. A total of seven machine guns were provided, distributed between the dedicated machine gun blocks and the artillery blocks. The 75mm guns had a range of 10.5 kilometres (6.5 mi) and could reach targets as far away as Lindau in Germany. The firing positions were connected by 1,000 metres (3,300 ft) of tunnels, linking them to two observation posts. The fort was manned by up to 200 soldiers, and included underground barracks, ammunition magazines, cisterns and utility facilities.

The fort is built into an east-facing slope of the Heldsberg massif. The surface components, running roughly from west to east, include:

- Mg1/Boeb1: Machine gun/observation block.
- BK1: 75mm gun block.
- BK2: 75mm gun block.
- Mg2/Mg3: Machine gun block.
- Entry: Facing to the rear, close to the underground utility plant and barracks.
- BK4: 75mm gun block.
- BK3/Mg4: 75mm gun, machine gun block.
- Mg5/Boeb2: Machine gun/observation block.
- Emergency exit: Facing the rear.
- Mg7: Machine gun block.
- Mg6: Machine gun block.

The fort commands the rail crossing of the Rhine. The tracks at the Swiss end of the bridge featured a turnout that would send an enemy armored train off the tracks and down an embankment, to be fired upon by the machine gun in Block 4. On 14 May 1940 a false alarm caused the switch to be activated, nearly derailing an innocent coal train.

A number of unconnected satellite bunkers support the main fort and provide covering fire for anti-tank barriers.

== Present situation ==
Heldsberg was decommissioned as obsolete in 1992. Heldsberg was sold out of Swiss military service to the town of St. Margrethen, which operates it as a museum. The museum opened in 1993.

== See also ==
- List of museums in Switzerland
