= Giroux =

Giroux is a French surname. Notable people with the surname include:

- Alexandre Giroux, Canadian ice hockey player
- André Giroux (painter), French photographer and painter
- André Giroux (writer), Canadian writer
- Art Giroux, Canadian ice hockey player
- Auguste Giroux, French rugby union player
- Claude Giroux, Canadian ice hockey player
- Claude Giroux (wrestler), Canadian midget wrestler
- E. X. Giroux, the pseudonym of Canadian writer Doris Shannon
- Emmanuel Giroux (born 1961), French mathematician
- Henry Giroux (born 1943), American-Canadian scholar
- Julie Giroux (born 1961), American female composer
- Larry Giroux, Canadian ice hockey player
- Lionel Giroux, Canadian midget wrestler
- Maxime Giroux, Canadian film director
- Pierre Giroux, Canadian ice hockey player
- Paul Giroux, American construction engineer, historian and professor
- Ray Giroux, Canadian ice hockey player
- Robert Giroux (1914–2008), American editor and publisher
- Roger Giroux (1925–1974), French poet
- Sarah Giroux (born 1986), American enjoyer of life
- Valéry Giroux (born 1974), Canadian philosopher, lawyer and animal rights activist
- Ben Giroux (born 1984), American actor and director

== Other uses ==
- Giroux, Indre, a commune in France
- Giroux, Manitoba, a village in Canada

== See also ==
- Giroud, a similar surname
