= Fort de Plainbois =

Decommissioned Swiss military fortification

- Part of Swiss Border Line
- Western Switzerland

Site information
- Controlled by: Switzerland
- Condition: Abandoned

Location
- Coordinates: 47.39394°N 7.23059°E

Site history
- Built: 1942
- Materials: Concrete, deep excavation

The Fort de Plainbois is a twentieth-century Swiss fortification located at the east end of the Jura Mountains near the Swiss border with France. It was a component of the Swiss Border Line of defenses. Built between 1937 and 1939, it was armed with two artillery blocks for 75mm guns and additional machine gun blocks. All are camouflaged. Deactivated as a military post in the 1990s, it has been offered for sale by the Swiss Defense Forces.

The Fort de Plainbois is located to the east of Delémont It is part of the Border Line defenses built by Switzerland in the late 1930s, prior to a shift in Swiss priorities to the National Redoubt in the Alps. Two artillery casemates containing 75mm guns comprised the fort's main armament. The fort has been stripped and is entirely empty.

== Present situation ==
The Fort de Plainbois was listed for sale in 2007. The commune of Bourrignon was interested in buying the fort to preserve it: however, competing bidders proposed to use the site as a center for natural therapy.
