= Border Line (Switzerland) =

Fortified line in Switzerland

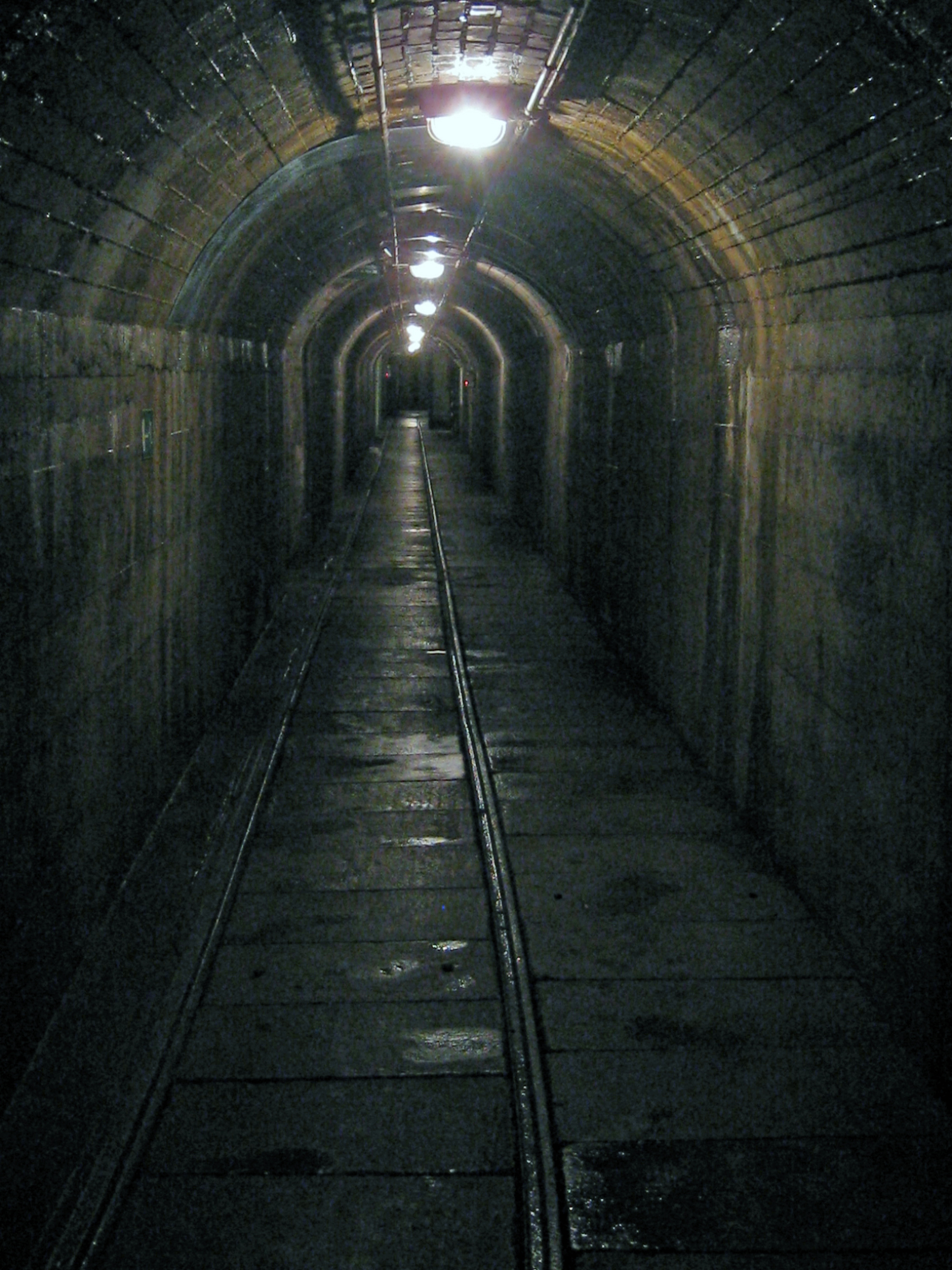
Fort Reuenthal at Swiss-German border

The Border Line defenses of Switzerland were constructed in the late 1930s in response to increasing tensions between Switzerland and its neighbours, chiefly the Axis powers of Germany and Italy. The Border Line was planned to slow or hold an invading force at the border. It consisted of a series of bunkers spaced at short intervals along the French, German and Austrian borders. The bunkers were reinforced by larger multi-blockhouse forts at key points. Most of the positions were within two or three kilometres (1.2 or 1.9 mi) of the frontier.

== Description ==
The Border Line bunkers were spaced between 500 metres (1,600 ft) and 750 metres (2,460 ft) along the northern border of Switzerland. A number were integrated into bridge crossings of the Rhine and other rivers.

The large forts were armed with 75mm artillery and anti-tank weapons and were usually built into the forward slope of a hill. The blockhouses were connected and supported by an underground gallery system giving access and shelter to underground barracks, ammunition magazines, command posts and utility services.

Compared with the Maginot Line, whose function was similar, the positions were less well-protected and lacked the ability to fire laterally along the line of attack from a sheltered location. The Border Line forts did not deploy a defense in depth.

== History ==
Work on the Border Line began in 1937 and was generally complete by 1940. However, with the German invasion of France in 1940, it became clear to the Swiss Armed Forces that the Border Line could not deter or withstand a direct German attack. Swiss priorities shifted to a policy of quick withdrawal to the National Redoubt in the Alps, there to maintain a government-in-being and to control the strategic crossings of the Alps for an extended time. While the German Operation Tannenbaum set forth a plan to invade Switzerland, the operation was never carried out. The Swiss war plan, devised by General Henri Guisan, envisioned the use of the Border Line as a delaying position, backed by a further hold line, the so-called Army Line, to give the bulk of Swiss forces time to retreat to the Redoubt destroying access points once Swiss forces were safely inside.

Following World War II, the main border positions remained manned. However, by the 1980s it became apparent that the positions were obsolete, and were gradually decommissioned, even before the Army 95 stand-down of many Swiss fortifications. A number of the positions have become museums and may be toured.

== Major positions ==
Major forts on the Border Line included, from west to east:

- Fort de Pré-Giroud 46.70903°N 6.41033°E near Vallorbe on the French border
- Fort de Plainbois 47.39394°N 7.23059°E about 30 kilometres (19 mi) west of Basel
- Fort Reuenthal 47.60476°N 8.20223°E about 40 kilometres (25 mi) northwest of Zurich
- Fort Ebersberg 47.57194°N 8.57931°E halfway between Schaffhausen and Zurich, where German and Swiss territory interlock with each other
- Fort Heldsberg 47.44278°N 9.64389°E at St. Margrethen on the Austrian border

== See also ==
- Toblerone line, a related line between Lausanne and Geneva, facing France. About thirty bunkers defend a 10-kilometre (6.2 mi) continuous line of anti-tank obstacles between Bassins and Prangins.
