= Canon de 75 antiaérien mle 1913–1917 =

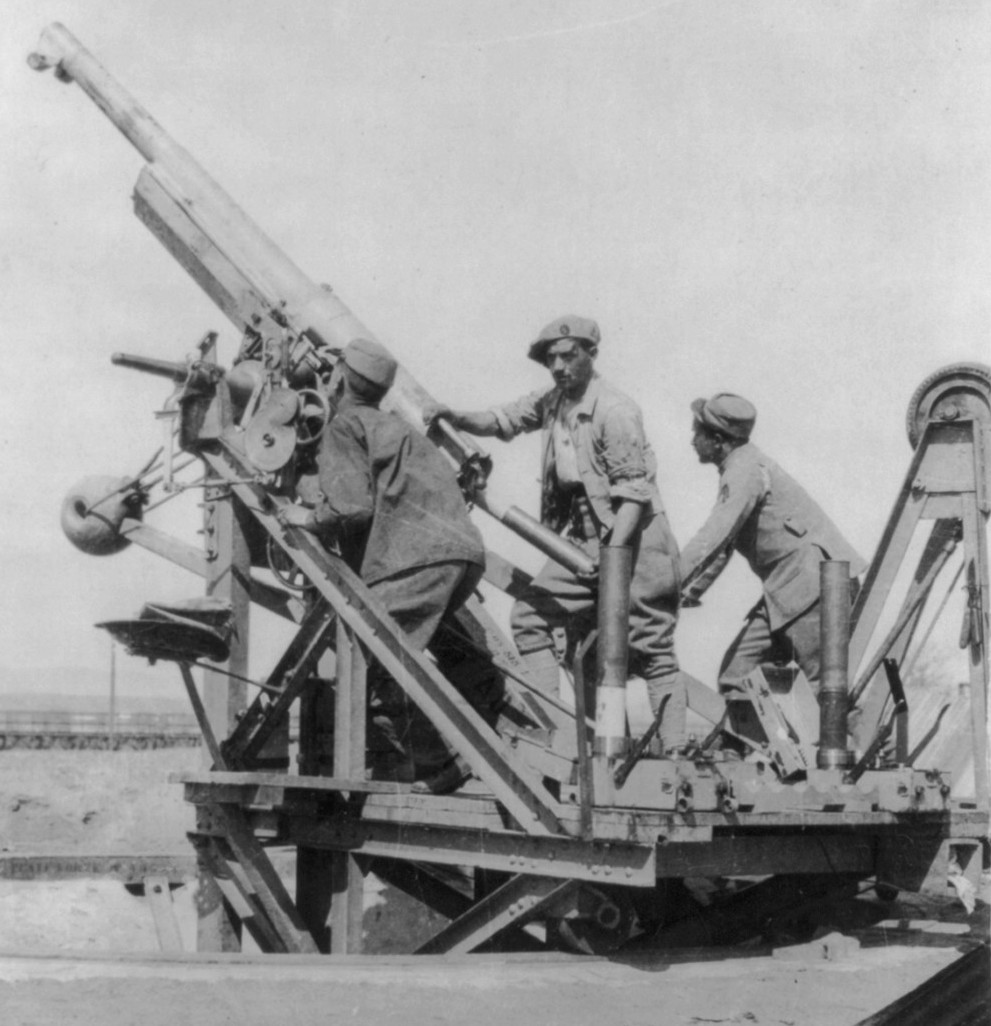
- French canon de 75 mm antiaérien mle 1915 at Salonika in World War I.
- Type: Anti-aircraft gun
- Place of origin: France

Service history
- In service: 1913–1940
- Used by: See § Users
- Wars: World War I; Polish–Soviet War; World War II

Production history
- Designer: Atelier de Construction de Puteaux
- Designed: 1910–1916
- Manufacturer: Atelier de Construction de Puteaux
- Developed from: Canon de 75 mm modèle 1897
- Developed into: Canon de 75 mm CA modèle 1940
- Variants: Modèle 1913; Modèle 1915; Modèle 1917

Specifications
- Mass: 3,000 kg (6,600 lb)
- Barrel length: 2.7 m (8 ft 10 in) L/33
- Shell: Fixed QF 75 × 350 mm R
- Shell weight: 6.25 kg (13.8 lb)
- Caliber: 75 mm (3.0 in)
- Breech: Nordenfelt eccentric screw
- Recoil: Hydro-pneumatic
- Elevation: +10° to 70°
- Traverse: 360°
- Rate of fire: 12 rpm
- Muzzle velocity: 575 m/s (1,890 ft/s)
- Effective firing range: 6.5 km (21,000 ft)

The Canon de 75 antiaérien mle 1913, 1915 and 1917 were a family of French 75 mm anti-aircraft guns designed and manufactured by Atelier de Construction de Puteaux. Using the barrel of the Canon de 75 modèle 1897 field gun, these guns were used by the French Army during the First World War and Second World War.

== History ==
The origins of the modèle 1913, 1915 and 1917 go back to the Canon de 75 modèle 1897 field gun which was first employed on improvised anti-aircraft mounts, which were typically earthen embankments or scaffolds to get the muzzle pointed skyward. Later in the war, specialized anti-aircraft mounts were developed. The recoil brake of the modèle 1897 was modified to reduce the stress placed on the mount by the high elevation angles.

These included:

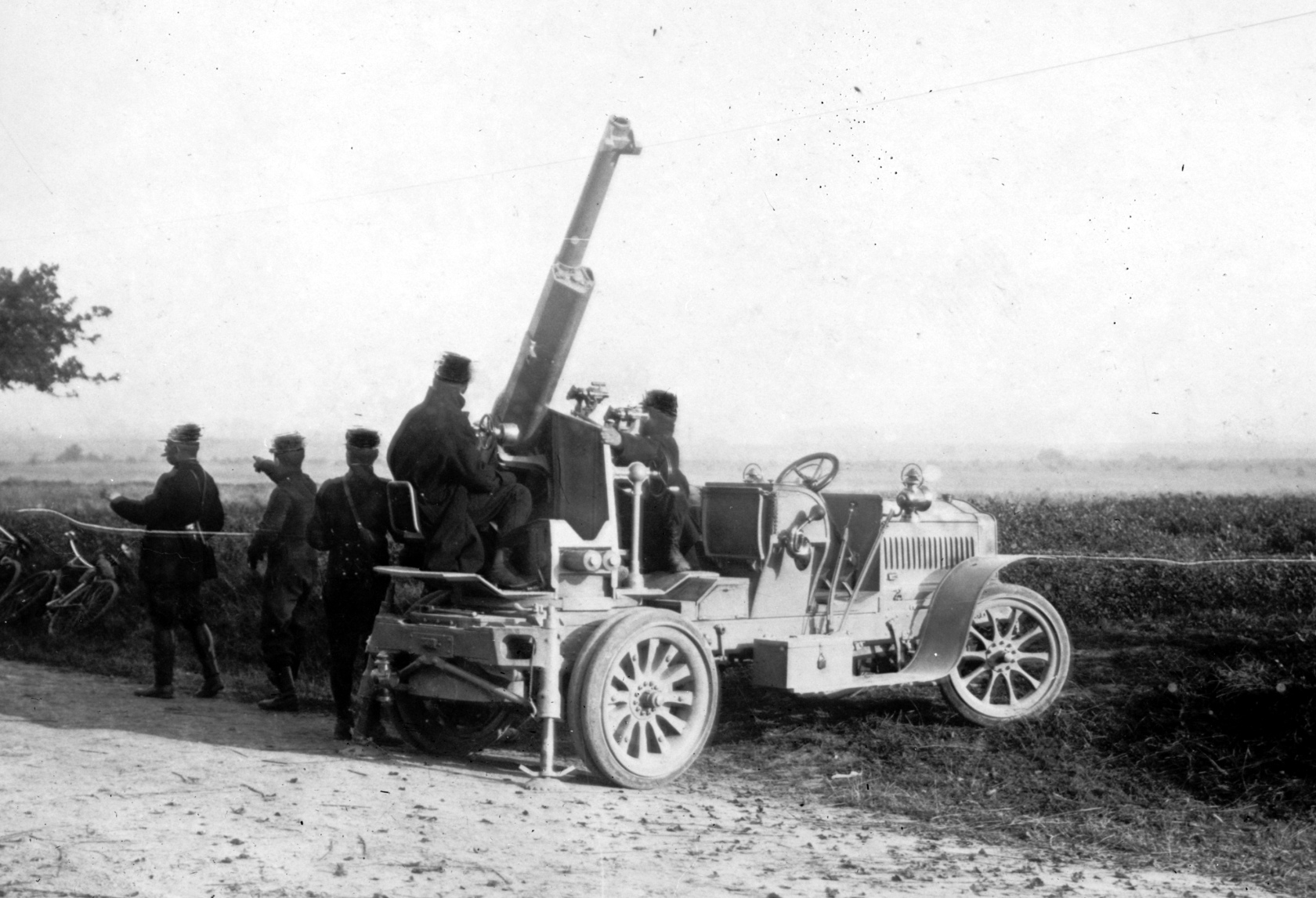
Autocanon de 75 mm antiaérien mle 1910 (prototype of the modèle 1913 version).

- Autocanon de 75 mm modèle 1897 antiaérien modèle 1913 - a self-propelled version, on the back of a De Dion-Bouton truck chassis. After a prototype tested from 1910 to 1912, Puteaux received a first order for 20 self-propelled versions in 1913. From 1916, new fire directions equipment improved their effectiveness, which were close to zero at the start of the War. By the end of World War I, 200 had been completed.

During the War, four autocanons were supplied to the Royal Naval Reserve, four to the Belgian Army and five to the American Expeditionary Forces. A total of 12 guns were supplied to Poland and used in the Polish–Soviet War by the 3rd Battalion, 1st Anti-Aircraft Regiment. During the 1930s, these guns had their original De Dion-Bouton chassis replaced by the Polski Fiat 621 truck chassis.

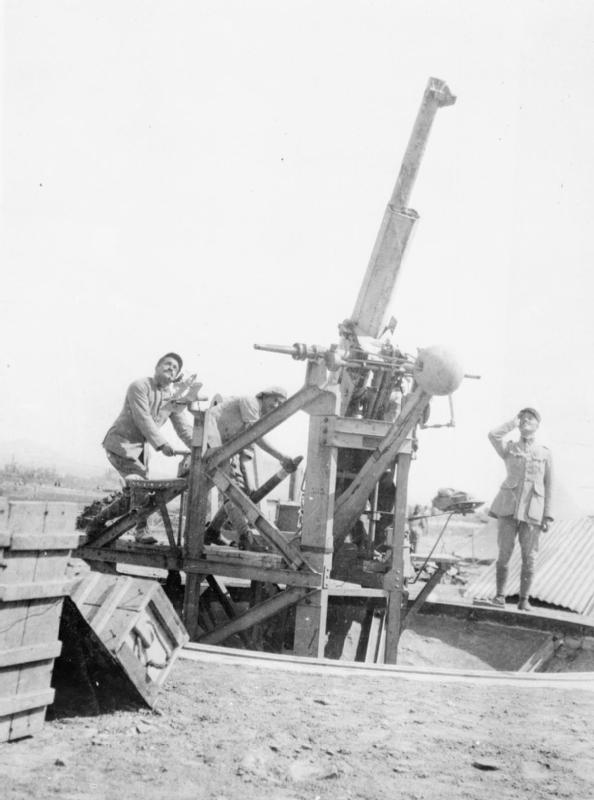
Canon de 75 mm antiaérien mle 15 at Salonika in 1917.

- Canon de 75 mm modèle 1897 antiaérien sur plateforme modèle 1915 - a pit mounted high-angle steel girder framework which took approximately 24 hours to prepare for firing. There was also a version with a rotating platform mounted on a concrete pedestal. The platform allowed 0° to 75° of elevation and 360° traverse. During the 1930s improvements in aircraft speed and ceiling combined with slow traverse and elevation of the mount rendered them obsolete. In April 1940 approximately 20 mle 1915 were left in service.
- Canon de 75 mm modèle 1897 antiaérien sur remorque modèle 1917 - a single-axle towed version with three outriggers. This had all fire-control equipment mounted on the carriage and was a Schneider design.
- 7.7 cm FlaK L/35 - a Krupp conversion of captured M1897 field guns to fire German 7.7 cm ammunition. The guns were placed on a modified de Bange 120 or 155 carriage to allow up to 60° of elevation and the guns were mounted on an elevated ring to allow 360° of traverse. By Spring of 1916 every division had a two gun platoon for AA defense and 394 guns were converted. An unknown number of guns were also converted by Rheinmetall to stationary AA guns. This conversion entailed mounting the guns on a high-angle pedestal mount with a platform and 360° traverse. When the barrels became worn out they were replaced with German made ones of the same length without the distinctive muzzle roller guides of the French gun.

The most common anti-aircraft configuration was a fixed battery of four mle 1915 guns located near cities, factories or military bases. Target range was measured by optical coincidence rangefinders and height by optical height finders which measured the distance to the target and the elevation angle, which together gave the height of the aircraft. These coordinates were transmitted to a single Brocq fire-control station, which was an electric tachymetric device that calculated target speed, altitude and direction to determine deflection angles. The deflection calculations were transmitted to displays on each gun for the crew to aim at for barrage fire. The guns themselves had only simple sights and lacked the ability to engage individual targets.

Anti-aircraft effectiveness during the First World War was poor but many of these systems remained in use without improvement until the Second World War, by which time they were nearly useless against faster, higher flying targets. During the late 1920s it was realized that the mle 1897 was outmoded as an anti-aircraft weapon and development of a new gun barrel was begun in 1928. The goals of the rearmament program were faster rate of fire, higher muzzle velocity, increased vertical range, modern fire control and greater mobility with new gun carriages. Priority for armaments was given to the Maginot Line fortifications being built and work moved at a slow pace. Lack of funds meant all three anti-aircraft versions of the mle 1897 were still in use in large numbers when World War II began in 1939. It is estimated that 913 mle 1897 anti-aircraft guns were still in service in 1940.

== Modernizations ==
- Canon de 75 mm antiaérien mle 1928 GB - Increases in aircraft performance lead to a proposal in 1925 to improve the capabilities of DCA guns. The Manufacture d'Arme de Levallois (MLS) proposed replacing the old gun barrels with new 53 caliber barrels with muzzle brake built by Schneider. This raised muzzle velocity to 700 m/s (2,300 ft/s) and raised the effective ceiling to 7,500 m (24,600 ft).
- Autocanon de 75 mm contre aéronefs modèle 1913 modifié 1934, Canon de 75 mm antiaérien sur plateforme mle 1915/34and Canon de 75 mm antiaérien sur remorque mle 1917/34 - From 1934, all the mle 1913 self-propelled guns, static mle 1915 and towed mle 1917 guns in service with the French Army had their obsolete fire systems replaced by a modern one. They were still in service during the Battle of France.
- Canon de 75 mm antiaérien mle 1928/39 - An upgrade of the static mle 1915 platform guns with mle 1928 gun barrels.
- Canon de 75 mm antiaérien mle 1932 ABS - Arsenal de Bourges (ABS) developed a new gun carriage with four folding cruciform outriggers. It used the same mle 1928 barrel and was equipped with an automatic breech which raised the rate of fire of 25 rounds per minute. The carriage was designed for motor traction and could be towed at 40 km/h (25 mph) and could be combat ready in 20 minutes. A total of 332 were in service in May 1940.
- Canon de 75 mm antiaérien mle 1933 - A competing model from Schneider with four folding cruciform outriggers. It used the same mle 1928 barrel, could fire 20 rounds per minute, could be towed at 8 km/h (5 mph) and could be combat ready in 30 minutes. A total of 192 were in service in May 1940.

== German Service ==
Large numbers of 75 mm guns were captured by Germany after the French defeat in 1940.

Guns in German service were called:

- 7.5 cm Flak 97(f) - These were un-modernized mle 1897 guns. Some were sold to Axis satellites, some were converted to 7.5 cm Pak 97/38 anti-tank guns and others were integrated into Atlantic Wall defenses.
- 7.5 cm Flak M.17/34(f) - Modernized mle 17/34 guns in German service as anti-aircraft guns.

== Users ==
- Belgium
- France
- German Empire
- Nazi Germany
- Poland
- United Kingdom
- United States

== Photo Gallery ==
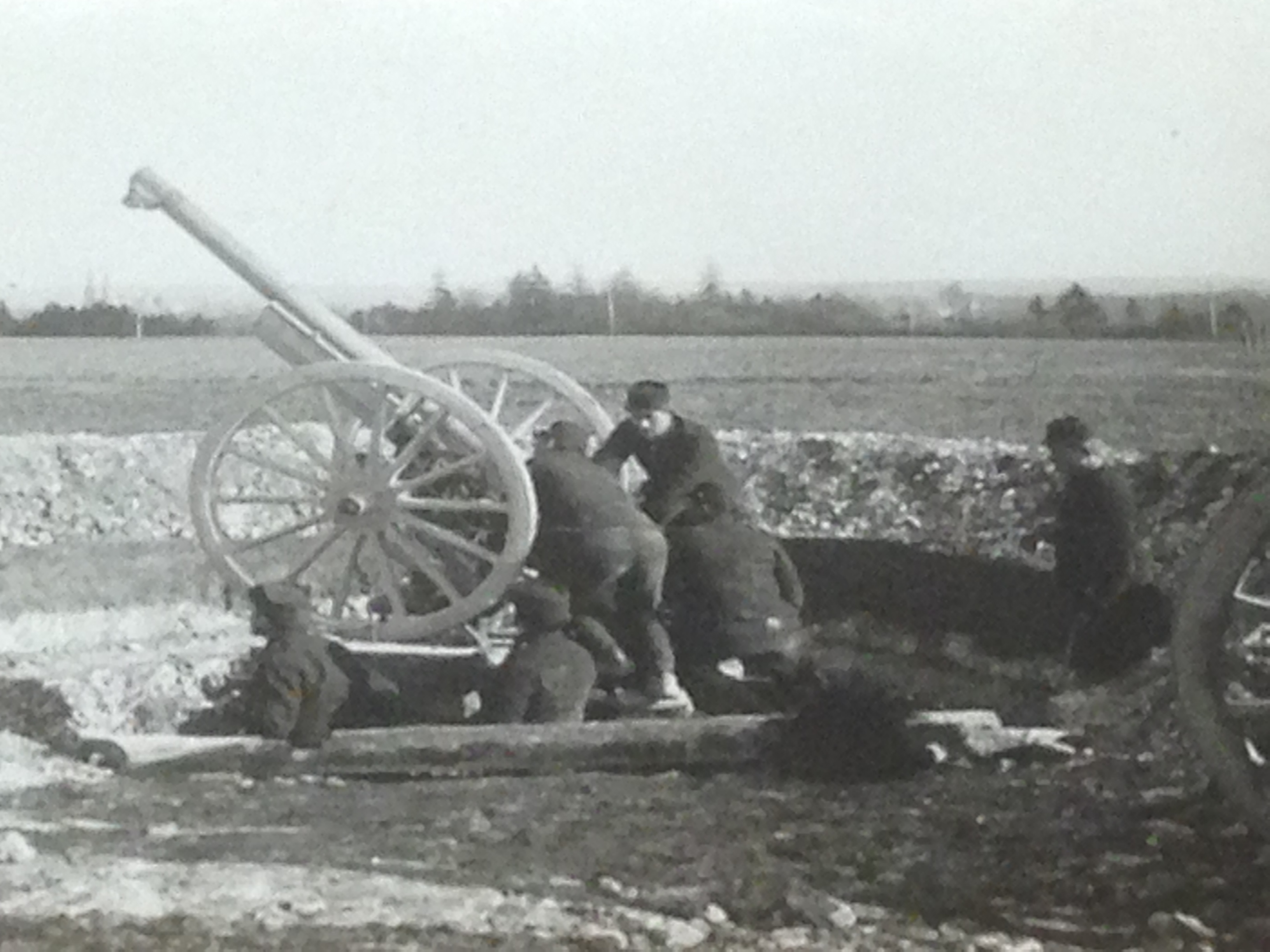
An improvised anti-aircraft mount with a mle 1897.

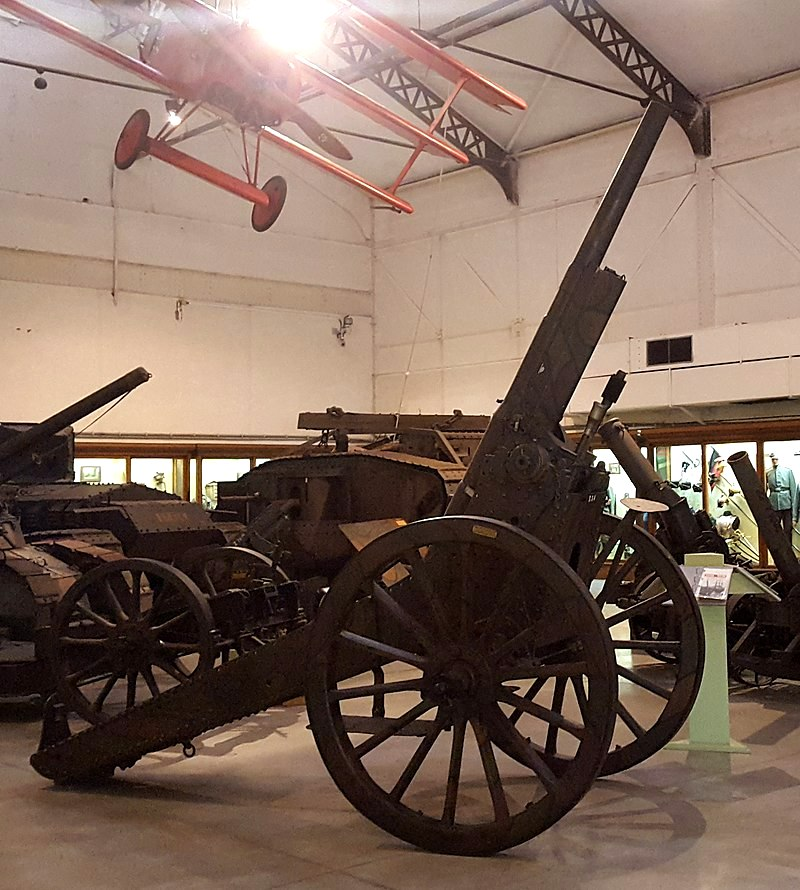
A Krupp 7.7 cm FlaK L/35 AA gun at the Musée royal de l'armée, Brussels.

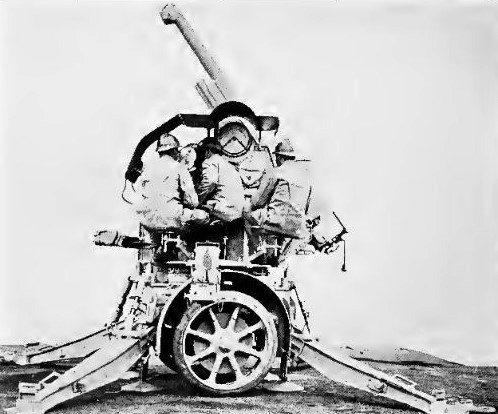
Canon de 75 mm antiaérien mle 1917.

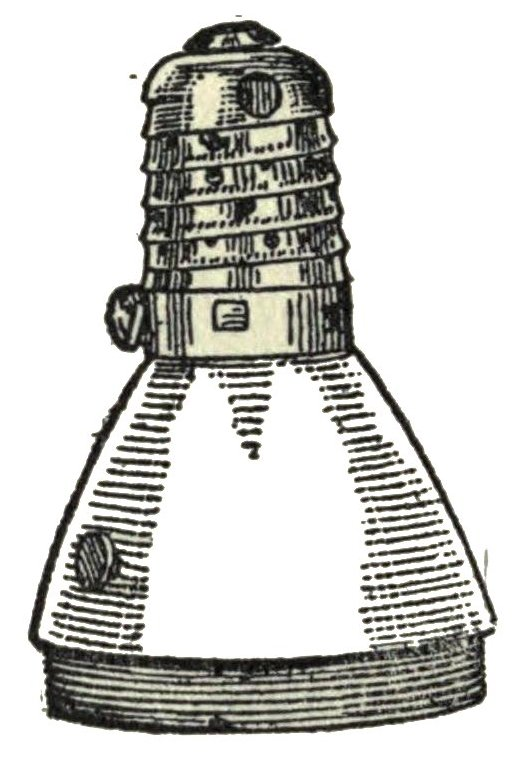
A French time fuse from WWI.
