= Ebersberg (Rhön) =

Coordinates: 50°28′31″N 9°51′13″E

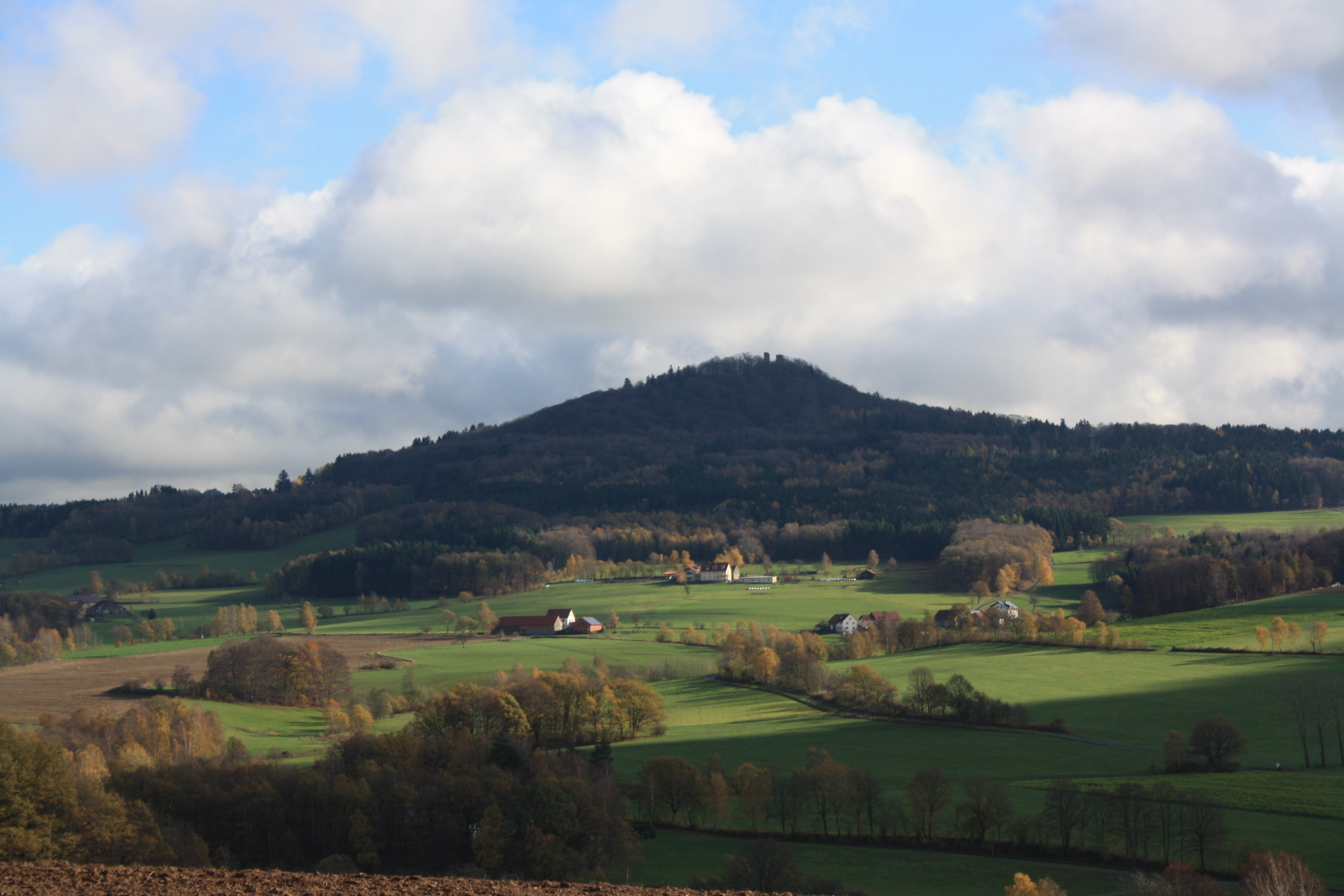

Highest point
- Elevation: 689 m (2,260 ft)
- Prominence: 94 m (308 ft)

Geography
- Location: Hesse, Germany

Ebersberg is a mountain of Hesse, Germany.
