= Fort Ebersberg =

Museum in Berg am Irchel (Switzerland)

- Part of Swiss Border Line
- Northern Switzerland
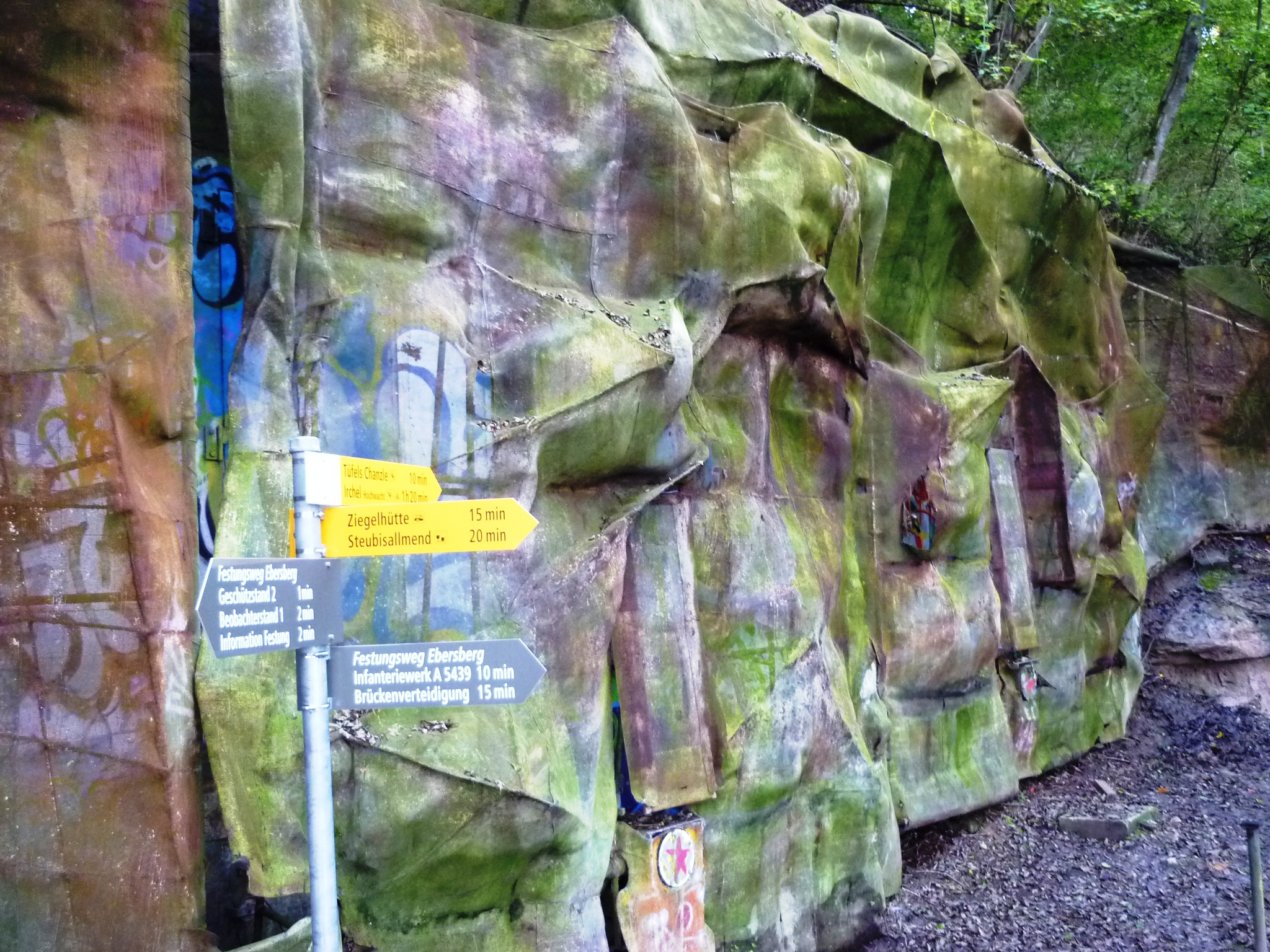
- Camouflaged gun position at Fort Ebersberg

Site information
- Owner: Private
- Controlled by: Switzerland
- Open to the public: Yes
- Condition: Preserved

Location
- Coordinates: 47.57194°N 8.57931°E

Site history
- Built: 1940
- Materials: Concrete, deep excavation

Fort Ebersberg, also known as Fort Rüdlingen, was built between 1938 and 1940 in the Swiss Canton of Zurich to guard the Rhine against a German invasion at the opening of World War II. It is the only such position in the Zurich canton, located near the town of Berg am Irchel. The fort was part of the Swiss Border Line defenses, Swiss military designation A5438.

== Description ==
The fort was built between 1938 and 1940, buried in sandstone on a north-facing slope. In 1978, the weapons were removed. The fort was decommissioned April 2003. Ebersberg's primary weapons were two semi-automatic 75mm guns in separate blockhouses, intended to hamper a German crossing of the Rhine.

== Present situation ==
The surface installations at Ebersberg are accessible and have interpretive displays. The subterranean parts of the fort are not accessible to the public. The site is maintained in preservation under a long-term lease by the Military Historical Foundation of the Canton of Zurich. Although the guns were removed, the remainder of the equipment remains. Public tours are available.
