= Fort de Pré-Giroud =

Historical museum in Vallorbe (Switzerland)

- Part of Swiss Border Line
- Western Switzerland
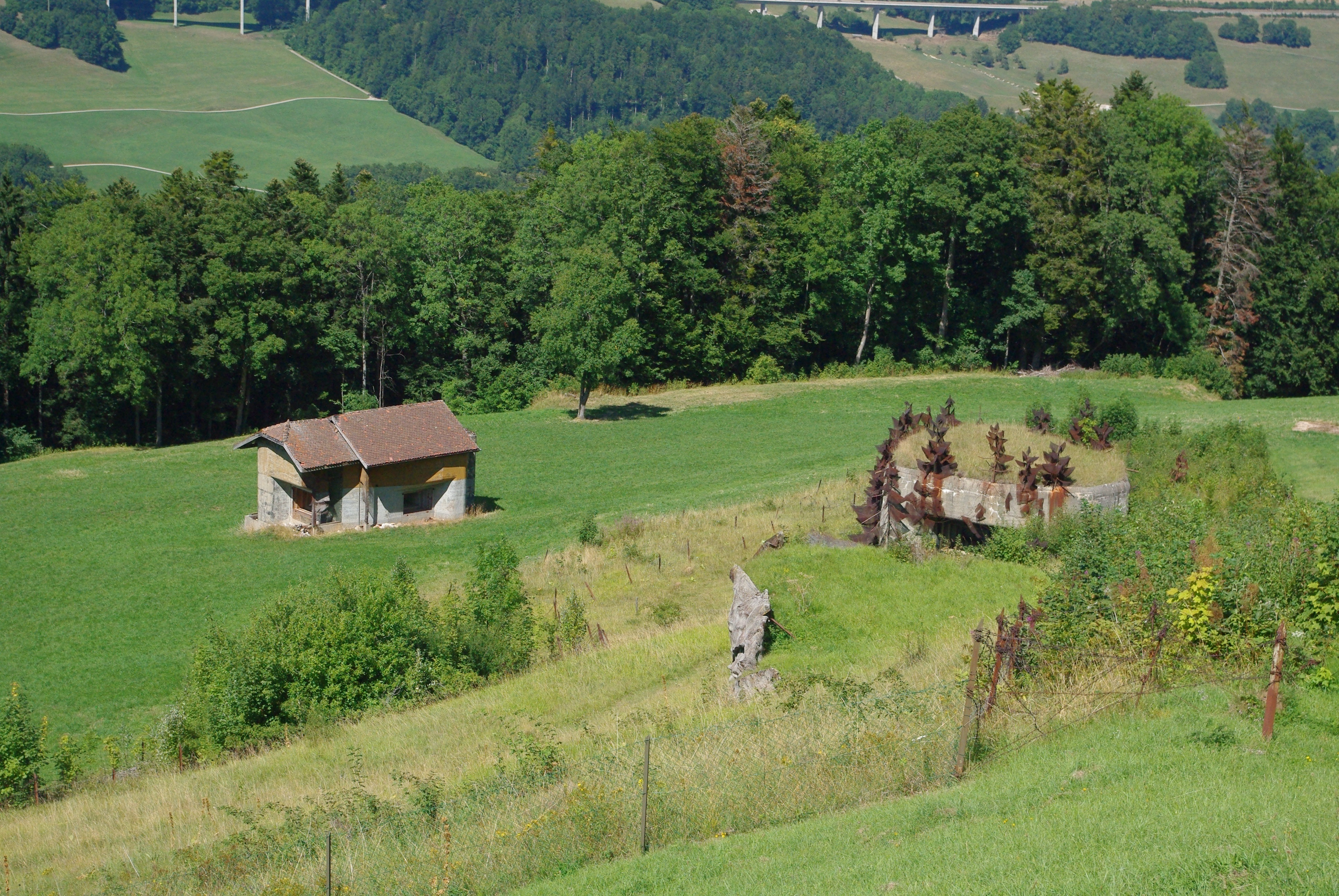
- Casemates at the Pré-Giroud military fort

Site information
- Owner: Private
- Controlled by: Switzerland
- Open to the public: Yes
- Condition: Preserved

Location
- Coordinates: 46°42′32.5″N 6°24′37.2″E

Site history
- Built: 1942
- Materials: Concrete, deep excavation

The Fort de Pré-Giroud, also known as the Fort de Vallorbe, is a 20th-century Swiss fortification located in the Jura Mountains near the Swiss border with France. The fort defended the Col de Jougne at Vallorbe, one of the few points in the Jura that could be easily traversable by an invading force. It was a component of the Swiss Border Line of defenses. Built between 1937 and 1939, the fort covers the Swiss end on the Mont d'Or railroad tunnel and the Joux valley. It is armed with three artillery blocks for 75mm guns and two machine gun blocks. All are camouflaged, the artillery blocks as rock formations, and the machine gun blocks as houses. Deactivated as a military post in the 1980s, it is operated as a museum.

== Description ==
The Fort de Pré-Giroud is located to the east of Vallorbe, in a steep hillside facing north, towards the Jougnes gap. It is part of the Border Line defenses built by Switzerland in the late 1930s, prior to a shift in Swiss priorities to the National Redoubt in the Alps.

The fort is laid out in a roughly triangular shape, with the base of the triangle at the bottom of the steep slope. Three multi-level artillery casemates containing 75mm guns are located near the middle, flanked by machine gun blocks. To the rear, deeply buried in the hillside, are ammunition magazines, utility areas and underground barracks. The barracks are at a depth of 50 metres (160 ft). The main fort is surrounded by four smaller bunkers, unconnected to the main fort system.

Armament includes:

- C1: casemate with one 75mm Model 1939 semi-automatic gun
- C2: casemate with one 75mm gun, one 47mm semi-automatic anti-tank gun, observation post
- C3: as C1
- M1: machine gun casemate with one 7.5mm Model 1911 water-cooled gun, observation post and emergency exit
- M2: machine gun casemate with two machine guns
- M3: as M2
- M4: as M1

The perimeter blockhouses are each armed with two machine guns. Infantry for exterior protection were further armed with 24, and 47mm anti-tank weapons, two 81mm mortars, four machine guns and eight automatic rifles. These were added in 1941, along with barbed-wire entanglements, stated to be lessons learned from the successful German assault on the Belgian Fort Eben-Emael.

The machine gun blocks are covered by wood superstructures in the shape of chalets, while the artillery blocks are covered in rough rock-shaped shells, with metal branch-like camouflage. Unlike contemporary French fortifications of the Maginot Line, which are sited to avoid prominent exposures and which are positioned to fire obliquely, along the defensive lines, the Pré-Giroud fort is relatively exposed and fires directly ahead.

The fort was manned by more than 200 men.

== Present situation ==
The Fort de Pré-Giroud was decommissioned in the 1980s, on grounds that its levels of protection and armament were inadequate and obsolete. It was sold in 1988. It is now operated as a museum.
